= R. Kelly production discography =

R. Kelly discography
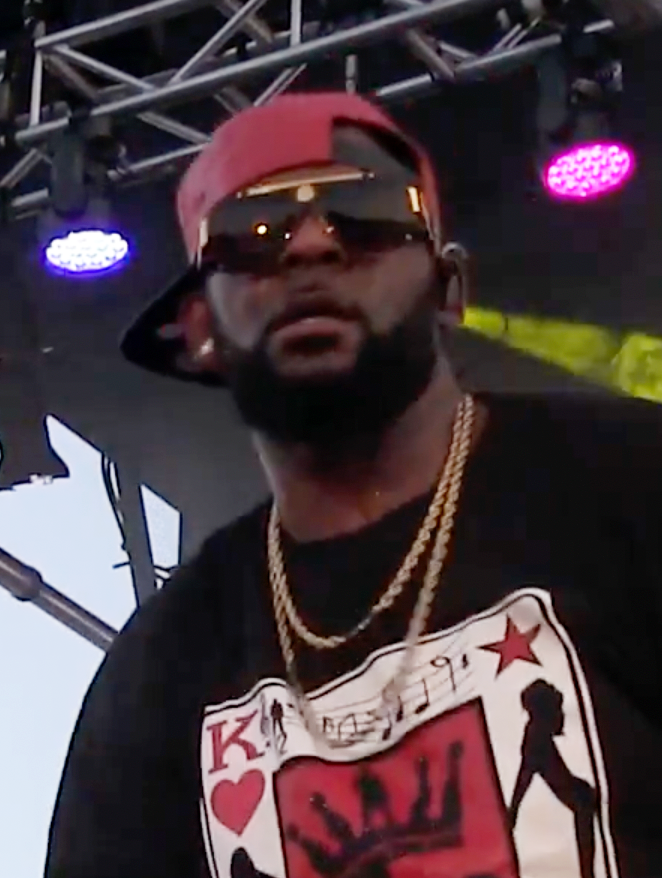
- R. Kelly in 2017
- Studio albums: 4
- Soundtrack albums: 2
- Singles: 31
- Non singles: 37

This is the production discography of R. Kelly. Records that are produced by Kelly for himself or him as a featuring artist are not included in this list.

== Albums produced ==
=== Studio albums ===
List of studio albums, with selected chart positions, sales figures and certifications
Title	Album details	Peak chart positions										Sales	Certifications
Title	Album details	US	US R&B/HH	AUS	CAN	GER	NLD	NZ	SWE	SWI	UK	Sales	Certifications
Keep It Goin' On (Hi-Five)	Released: May 20, 1992 (US); Genre: R&B; Label: Jive; Format: CD, LP, cassette, digital download	82	9	—	—	—	—	—	—	—	—		RIAA: Gold
Age Ain't Nothing but a Number (Aaliyah)	Released: May 24, 1994 (US); Genre: R&B, New jack swing; Label: Blackground, Jive; Format: CD, LP, cassette, digital download	18	3	—	20	—	44	—	—	—	23	World: 6,000,000; US: 3,000,000	RIAA: 2× Platinum; BPI: Gold; MC: Gold
Sparkle (Sparkle)	Released: May 20, 1998 (US); Genre: R&B; Label: Interscope, Rockland; Format: CD, LP, cassette, digital download	3	2	—	—	—	—	—	—	—	—		RIAA: Gold
Body Kiss (The Isley Brothers)	Released: May 6, 2003 (US); Genre: Urban adult contemporary, Rhythm and blues, soul; Label: T-Neck, DreamWorks; Format: CD, LP, cassette, digital download	1	1	—	—	—	—	—	—	—	—		RIAA: Gold
Ice Cream (JS)	Released: July 11, 2003 (US); Genre: soul, hip hop, R&B; Label: DreamWorks; Format: CD, LP, cassette, digital download	33	11	—	—	—	—	—	—	—	—		
"—" denotes a recording that did not chart or was not released in that territory.

=== Soundtrack albums ===
List of studio albums, with selected chart positions, sales figures and certifications
Title	Album details	Peak chart positions										Sales	Certifications
Title	Album details	US	US R&B/HH	AUS	CAN	GER	NLD	NZ	SWE	SWI	UK	Sales	Certifications
Life (Various Artist)	Released: March 16, 1999 (US); Genre: hip hop, R&B; Label: Rockland, Interscope; Format: CD, LP, cassette, digital download	10	2	—	—	—	—	—	—	—	—		RIAA: Platinum
Sparkle: Original Motion Picture Soundtrack (Various Artist)	Released: July 31, 2012 (US); Genre: soul, R&B, disco; Label: RCA; Format: CD, digital download	21	3	—	—	—	—	—	—	—	—		
"—" denotes a recording that did not chart or was not released in that territory.

== Singles produced ==
=== 1990s ===
List of singles produced, with selected chart positions and certifications, showing year released and album name
Title	Year	Peak chart positions											Certifications	Album
Title	Year	US	US R&B/HH	AUS	CAN	SWE	GER	IRE	NZ	SWI	NED	UK	Certifications	Album
"String" (David Peaston)	1991	—	69	—	—	—	—	—	—	—	—	—		Mixed Emotions
"Quality Time" (Hi-Five)	1992	38	3	—	—	—	—	—	36	—	—	—	RIAA: Gold	Keep It Goin' On
"Everything s So Different Without You" (Billy Ocean)	1993	—	91	—	—	—	—	—	—	—	—	—		Time to Move On
"Back & Forth" (Aaliyah)	1994	5	1	100	7	—	—	—	48	—	2	16	RIAA: Gold	Age Ain't Nothing but a Number
"At Your Best (You Are Love)" (Aaliyah)	1994	6	2	—	—	—	—	11	39	—	40	27	RIAA: Gold	Age Ain't Nothing but a Number
"Age Aint Nothing but a Number" (Aaliyah)	1994	75	35	—	—	—	—	—	—	—	—	32		Age Ain't Nothing but a Number
"Spend The Night" (N Phase)	1994	—	20	—	—	—	—	—	—	—	—	—		N-Phase
"Stroke You Up" (Changing Faces)	1994	3	2	—	—	—	—	—	15	—	—	43	RIAA: Platinum	Changing Faces
"Foolin' Around" (Changing Faces)	1994	38	9	—	—	—	—	—	—	—	—	—		Changing Faces
"Any Time, Any Place (R. Kelly mix)" (Janet Jackson)	1994	2	1	37	6	—	—	—	20	—	—	13	RIAA: Gold	janet
"The Thing I Like" (Aaliyah)	1995	—	—	—	—	—	—	—	—	—	—	33		A Low Down Dirty Shame (soundtrack)
"You Are Not Alone" (Michael Jackson)	1995	1	1	2	2	2	4	1	1	1	6	1	RIAA: Platinum; ARIA: Platinum; SNEP: Gold; BVMI: Gold; RMNZ: Gold; IFPI Switzerland: Gold; IFPI Austria: Gold; BPI: Platinum	HIStory: Past, Present and Future, Book I
"Let's Lay Together" (The Isley Brothers)	1996	93	24	—	—	—	—	—	—	—	—	—		Mission to Please
"I Don't Want To" (Toni Braxton)	1996	19	9	71	13	15	37	10	21	—	33	9	RIAA: Gold	Secrets
"G.H.E.T.T.O.U.T." (Changing Faces)	1997	8	1	—	—	—	—	—	22	—	—	10	RIAA: Platinum	All Day, All Night
"God s Grace" (Trin-i-tee 5:7)	1998	—	32^{[A]}	—	—	—	—	—	—	—	—	—		Trin-i-tee 5:7
"Time To Move On" (Sparkle)	1998	—	41^{[A]}	—	—	—	—	—	—	—	—	—		Sparkle
"808" (Blaque)	1999	8	4	—	—	—	—	—	—	—	—	—		Blaque
"Life" (K-Ci & JoJo)	1999	60	15	—	—	—	—	—	—	—	—	—		It's Real and Life (soundtrack)
"Fortunate" (Maxwell)	1999	4	1	—	—	—	—	—	—	—	—	—	RIAA: Gold	Life (soundtrack)
"It's Gonna Rain" (Kelly Price)	1999	—	51	—	—	—	—	—	—	—	—	—		Life (soundtrack)

=== 2000s ===
List of singles produced, with selected chart positions and certifications, showing year released and album name
Title	Year	Peak chart positions											Certifications	Album
Title	Year	US	US R&B/HH	AUS	CAN	SWE	GER	IRE	NZ	SWI	NED	UK	Certifications	Album
"Celebrity" (Talent)	2000	—	90	—	—	—	—	—	—	—	—	—		Bull's Eye
"Cry" (Michael Jackson)	2001	—	101	65	—	48	76	—	—	42	39	25		Invincible
"I Am Your Woman" (Syleena Johnson)	2001	—	43	—	—	—	—	—	—	—	—	—		Chapter 1: Love, Pain & Forgiveness
"Bump, Bump, Bump" (B2K)	2002	1	2	4	—	53	7	25	10	2	10	11	ARIA: Platinum; SNEP: Silver	Pandemonium!
"The Truth" (Truth Hurts)	2002	—	47	—	—	—	—	—	—	—	—	—		Truthfully Speaking
"Guess What" (Syleena Johnson)	2002	—	29	—	—	—	—	—	—	—	—	—		Chapter 2: The Voice
"Girlfriend" (B2K)	2003	30	19	39	—	—	—	—	—	19	48	10		Pandemonium!
"What a Girl Wants" (B2K)	2003	—	47	—	—	—	—	—	—	—	—	—		Pandemonium!
"Feelin' Freaky" (B2K feat. Nick Cannon)	2003	92	46	—	—	—	—	—	—	—	—	—		Nick Cannon
"Busted" (The Isley Brothers feat. JS)	2003	112	35	—	—	—	—	—	—	—	—	—		Body Kiss
"Outrageous" (Britney Spears)	2003	79	—	—	—	—	—	—	—	—	—	—		In the Zone
"Hell Yeah" (Ginuwine feat. Baby)	2003	17	16	—	—	—	—	—	—	—	38	27		The Senior
"One More Chance" (Michael Jackson)	2003	83	46	—	—	—	29	—	—	24	28	5		Number Ones
"More & More" (Joe)	2003	48	15	—	—	—	—	—	—	—	—	12		And Then...
"Ice Cream" (JS)	2003	124	54	—	—	—	—	—	—	—	—	—		Ice Cream
"Love Angel" (JS)	2003	—	61	—	—	—	—	—	—	—	—	—		Ice Cream
"Questions" (Tamia)	2004	112	40	—	—	—	—	—	—	—	—	—		More
"Charlie, Last Name Wilson" (Charlie Wilson)	2005	67	11	—	—	—	—	—	—	—	—	—		Charlie, Last Name Wilson
"Magic" (Charlie Wilson)	2005	—	27	—	—	—	—	—	—	—	—	—		Charlie, Last Name Wilson
"I Look to You (as songwriter)" (Whitney Houston)	2009	70	—	—	68	33	41	—	—	16	65	115	RIAA: Platinum	I Look to You
"You Are Not Alone (as songwriter)" (The X Factor Finalists 2009)	2009	—	—	—	—	—	—	1	—	—	—	1	BPI: Gold	Non-album single

=== 2010s ===
List of singles produced, with selected chart positions and certifications, showing year released and album name
Title	Year	Peak chart positions											Certifications	Album
Title	Year	US	US R&B/HH	AUS	CAN	SWE	GER	IRE	NZ	SWI	NED	UK	Certifications	Album
"I Look to You (as songwriter)" (Glee)	2010	74	—	—	74	—	—	—	—	—	—	137		"Grilled Cheesus"
"Where You At" (Jennifer Hudson)	2011	64	10	—	—	—	—	—	—	—	—	103		I Remember Me
"Fly/I Believe I Can Fly (as songwriter)" (Glee)	2012	56	—	87	59	—	—	70	—	—	—	121		"On My Way"
"Celebrate" (Whitney Houston and Jordin Sparks)	2012	—	39	—	—	—	—	—	—	—	—	—		Sparkle: Original Motion Picture Soundtrack
"Let 'Em Know (as songwriter)" (Bryson Tiller)	2016	121	42	—	—	—	—	—	—	—	—	—	RIAA: Gold	T R A P S O U L

- A. Charted only on the Hot R&B/Hip-Hop Airplay chart.

== 1991 ==
=== David Peaston - Mixed Emotions ===
- 06. I
- 08. String
- 09. Everybody Needs Somebody

=== Vickie Winans - The Lady ===
- 10. Don't Throw Your Life Away (Remix)

== 1992 ==
=== Hi-Five - Keep It Goin' On ===
- 02. Quality Time
- 05. A Little Bit Older Now
- 07. Let's Get It Started (Keep It Goin' On)
- 08. Video Girl

== 1993 ==
=== Billy Ocean - Time to Move On ===
- 09. Can We Go 'Round Again
- 10. Everything's So Different Without You

=== The Winans - All Out ===
- 01. Payday
- 04. That Extra Mile

== 1994 ==
=== Aaliyah - Age Ain't Nothing But a Number ===
- 01. Intro
- 02. Throw Your Hands Up
- 03. Back & Forth
- 04. Age Ain't Nothing But a Number
- 05. Down with the Clique
- 06. At Your Best (You Are Love)
- 07. No One Knows How to Love Me Quite Like You Do
- 08. I'm So Into You
- 09. Street Thing
- 10. Young Nation
- 11. Old School
- 12. I'm Down¨
- 13. The Thing I Like
- 14. Back & Forth (Remix)
- 00. At Your Best (You Are Love) (Remix)

=== Changing Faces - Changing Faces ===
- 01. Stroke You Up
- 02. Foolin' Around
- 13. All Is Not Gone

=== Ex-Girlfriend - It's a Woman Thang ===
- 03. You for Me

=== Various - A Low Down Dirty Shame OST ===
- 06. Changing Faces - Stroke You Up (Remix)
- 07. Aaliyah - The Thing I Like

=== Janet Jackson - janet. Remixed ===
- 11. Any Time, Any Place (R. Kelly Mix)

=== N-Phase - N-Phase ===
- 02. Spend the Night

=== Toni Braxton - How Many Ways 12" ===
- 04. How Many Ways (Remix)

=== Gerald Levert - Can't Help Myself 12" ===
01. Can't Help Myself (R. Kelly radio remix)

== 1995 ==
=== Quincy Jones - Q's Jook Joint ===
- 11. Heavens Girl

=== Michael Jackson - HIStory ===
- 09. You Are Not Alone

=== Michael Jackson - You Are Not Alone 12" ===
- 02. You Are Not Alone (R. Kelly Remix)

== 1996 ==
=== The Isley Brothers - Mission to Please ===
- 03. Let's Lay Together {also on Don't Be a Menace to South Central While Drinking Your Juice in the Hood (soundtrack)}
- 05. Can I Have a Kiss (For Old Time's Sake)?
- 06. Mission to Please You

=== Johnny Gill - Let's Get the Mood Right ===
- 09. Someone to Love

=== MC Lyte - Bad As I Wanna B ===
- 10. Two Seater

=== Toni Braxton - Secrets ===
- 10. I Don't Want To

== 1997 ==
=== Changing Faces - All Day, All Night ===
- 02. G.H.E.T.T.O.U.T.
- 07. All of My Days {also on Space Jam: Music from and Inspired by the Motion Picture}
- 08. All Day, All Night
- 09. G.H.E.T.T.O.U.T. (Pt. 2)

=== Mary J. Blige - Share My World ===
- 08. "It's On"

=== Various Artists - Diana, Princess of Wales: Tribute ===
- 17. Every Nation (by Red Hot R&B All-Stars) (features: Jane Binning, Magdalena Grubski, Anica Boulanger Mashberg, Jemma Gates, Jane Russell Taylor, Jane Polley, Sara Cooper, Astrid Wells Cooper, Les Winspear, and Nick Storr)

=== Vanessa Williams - Next ===
- 10. Start Again

== 1998 ==
=== Celine Dion - These Are Special Times ===
- 14. I'm Your Angel (Duet With R. Kelly) {also on R.}

=== Luther Vandross - One Night with You: The Best of Love, Volume 2 ===
- 02. When You Call on Me

=== Sparkle - Sparkle ===
- 01. Good Life
- 02. Time to Move On
- 03. Lean On Me
- 04. I'm Gone
- 05. Turn Away
- 06. What About
- 07. Be Careful
- 08. Nothing Can Compare
- 09. Quiet Place
- 10. Lovin' You
- 11. Straight Up
- 12. Vegas
- 13. No Greater
- 14. Play On
- 15. Plenty Good Lovin'

=== Trin-I-Tee 5:7 - Trin-I-Tee 5:7 ===
- 02. God's Grace

=== Various - Belly (soundtrack) ===
- 01. Lady - No Way In, No Way Out

=== Gerald Levert - Love & Consequences ===
- 09. Men Like Us

== 1999 ==
=== Blaque - Blaque ===
- 06. 808

=== Life: Music Inspired By The Motion Picture ===
- 02. It's Like Everyday
- 03. Stimulate Me
- 04. Fortunate
- 06. Every Which Way
- 07. It's Gonna Rain
- 08. Discovery
- 09. Follow the Wind
- 10. Why Should I Believe You
- 13. Speechless
- 14. Life

=== Trin-I-Tee 5:7 - Spiritual Love ===
- 08. There He Is

=== Various - Wild Wild West OST ===
- 08. Mailman - Faith Evans

== 2000 ==
=== Changing Faces - Visit Me ===
- 01. Visit Me

=== Kelly Price - Mirror Mirror ===
- 04. At Least (The Little Things)

== 2001 ==
=== 112 - Part III ===
- 14. Do What You Gotta Do

=== IMX - IMx ===
- 2. First Time

=== Michael Jackson - Invincible ===
- 07. Cry

=== Nivea - Nivea ===
- 02. Ya Ya Ya (feat. Lil' Wayne & R. Kelly)
- 04. The One for Me
- 05. Laundromat (feat. R. Kelly)

=== Syleena Johnson - Chapter 1: Love, Pain & Forgiveness ===
- 02. I Am Your Woman

=== The Isley Brothers - Eternal ===
- 02. Contagious

== 2002 ==
=== Blaque - Blaque Out ===
- 14. She Ain't Got That Boom (808 Remix)

=== B2K - Pandemonium! ===
- 02. Bump, Bump, Bump
- 03. Girlfriend
- 06. Bump That
- 08. What a Girl Wants

=== Syleena Johnson - Chapter 2: The Voice ===
- 05. Guess What
- 15. Tonight I'm Gonna Let Go (Remix)
- 16. Joined at the Hip

=== Truth Hurts - Truthfully Speaking ===
- 11. The Truth

== 2003 ==
=== ATL - The ATL Project ===
- 02. Calling All Girls/ Pt. 2

=== B2K - Greatest Hits ===
- 03. Girlfriend (Pied Piper Remix)

=== Big Tymers - Big Money Heavyweight ===
- 03. Gangsta Girl

=== Boo & Gotti - Perfect Timing ===
- 06. Dear Ghetto

=== Britney Spears - In the Zone ===
- 07. Outrageous

=== Nick Cannon - Nick Cannon ===
- 02. Feelin' Freaky (feat. B2K)
- 03. Gigolo
- 05. You

=== Ginuwine - The Senior ===
- 04. Hell Yeah/Remix

=== The Isley Brothers - Body Kiss ===
- 01. Superstar
- 02. Lucky Charm
- 03. What Would You Do?
- 04. Body Kiss
- 05. Busted
- 06. Showdown Vol. 1
- 07. Keep It Flowin'
- 08. Prize Possession
- 09. Take a Ride
- 11. I Like
- 12. What Would You Do? Pt. 2

=== JS - Ice Cream ===
- 01. Love Angel
- 03. Ice Cream
- 04. Bye-Bye
- 05. Slow Grind
- 06. Half
- 07. Ice Cream (Remix)
- 12. Stay Right Here
- 14. Sister

=== Marques Houston - MH ===
- 02. Clubbin'
- 16. That Girl (Remix)
- 17. Clubbin' (Remix)

=== Michael Jackson - Number Ones ===
- 17. One More Chance/Remix

=== Joe - And Then... ===
- 03. More & More
- 08. Make You My Baby

=== Russell - When I'm With You ===
- 02. Rich Man

=== Syleena Johnson - Guess What 12" ===
- 01. Guess What (Guess Again) (Remix)

=== Various - 2 Fast 2 Furious ===
- 05. Pick Up the Phone

== 2004 ==
=== Britney Spears - Greatest Hits: My Prerogative ===
- 14. Outrageous (R. Kelly Remix)

=== Jennifer Lopez - The Reel Me ===
- 06. Baby I Love U! (R. Kelly Remix)

=== Ciara - Goodies ===
- 09. Next to You

=== Tamia - More ===
- 05. Questions

=== Twista - Kamikaze ===
- 10. So Sexy
- 17. So Sexy: Chapter II (Like This)

=== Ruben Studdard - I Need an Angel ===
- 01. I Need an Angel

== 2005 ==
=== Ray J - Raydiation ===
- 09. Quit Actin'

=== Syleena Johnson - Chapter 3: The Flesh ===
- 02. Hypnotic
- 04. Special Occasion

=== Charlie Wilson - Charlie, Last Name Wilson ===
- 01. Magic
- 02. Charlie, Last Name Wilson
- 05. No Words

=== Do or Die - Victory ===
- 08. "Magic Chick"

=== Nivea - Complicated ===
- 04. "Gangsta Girl"

== 2006 ==
=== Sharissa - Every Beat of My Heart ===
- 04. In Love wit a Thug (Feat. R. Kelly)

=== The Isley Brothers - Baby Makin' Music ===
- 02. Blast Off

=== Tyrese - Alter Ego ===
- 08. Hurry Up
- 09. Signs of Love Makin', Pt. 2

== 2007 ==
=== Trey Songz - Trey Day ===
- 08. Grub On

=== Jaheim - The Makings of a Man ===
- 02. Hush

=== Twista - Adrenaline Rush 2007 ===
- 09. Love Rehab

=== Trin-i-tee 5:7 - T57 ===
- 10. U Saved Me

== 2008 ==
=== Frankie J - TBA ===
- 00. Dancin'

=== James Andrew ===
- 00. Welcome To My World
- 00. Savannah Chocolate
- 00. It's R&B (feat. R. Kelly)

== 2009 ==
=== Whitney Houston - I Look to You ===
- 11. Salute

== 2011 ==
=== Jennifer Hudson - I Remember Me ===
- 03. Where You At

=== Tyrese - Open Invitation ===
- 13. Angel (vocal production)

== 2012 ==
=== Sparkle: Music from the Motion Picture ===
- 06. Something He Can Feel (Carmen Ejogo, Jordin Sparks and Tika Sumpter)
- 07. His Eye Is on the Sparrow (Whitney Houston)
- 09. One Wing (Jordin Sparks)
- 10. Love Will (Jordin Sparks)
- 11. Celebrate (Whitney Houston & Jordin Sparks)

=== Whitney Houston - I Will Always Love You: The Best of Whitney Houston ===
- 17. I Look to You (Whitney Houston & R. Kelly)

== 2016 ==
=== Fantasia Barrino - The Definition Of... ===
- 05. Sleeping with the One I Love

== 2017 ==
=== Marvin Sapp - Close ===
- 03. Listen
