= Big Tymers discography =

Band discography

- Studio albums: 5
- Soundtrack albums: 1
- Singles: 9
- Music videos: 10

This is the discography of the American hip hop group Big Tymers.

== Albums ==
=== Studio albums ===
List of albums, with selected chart positions
Title	Album details	Peak chart positions		Certifications
Title	Album details	US	US R&B	Certifications
How You Luv That	Released: April 7, 1997; Re-released: March 17, 1998; Label: Cash Money; Format: CD, cassette, digital download	168	25	
How You Luv That Vol. 2	Released: September 22, 1998; Label: Cash Money, Universal; Format: CD, cassette, digital download	105	17	
I Got That Work	Released: May 16, 2000; Label: Cash Money, Universal; Format: CD, cassette, digital download	3	1	RIAA: Platinum
Hood Rich	Released: April 30, 2002; Label: Cash Money, Universal; Format: CD, digital download, LP	1	1	RIAA: Platinum
Big Money Heavyweight	Released: December 9, 2003; Label: Cash Money, Universal; Format: CD, cassette, digital download	21	6	RIAA: Gold

== Singles ==
Year	Song	U.S.	U.S. R&B	U.S. Rap	Album
1998	"Big Ballin" (feat. Chilli)	—	106	—	How You Luv That Vol. 2
1998	"Stun'N (Remix)" (feat. Papa Reu & Lil Wayne)	—	—	—	How You Luv That Vol. 2
2000	"Get Your Roll On"	101	24	—	I Got That Work
2000	"Number One Stunna" (feat. Lac, Juvenile & Lil Wayne)	105	24	—	I Got That Work
2002	"Still Fly"	11	4	3	Hood Rich
2002	"Oh Yeah!" (feat. Tateeze, Boo & Gotti)	46	23	13	Hood Rich
2003	"This Is How We Do"	97	53	—	Big Money Heavyweight
2003	"Gangsta Girl" (feat. R. Kelly)	85	38	24	Big Money Heavyweight
2004	"No Love"	—	95	—	Big Money Heavyweight
2018	"Designer Caskets"	—	—	—	Designer Caskets

=== Collaboration singles ===
Year	Song	U.S. Hot 100	U.S. R&B	Album
2000	"Project Chick" (with Cash Money Millionaires)	47	17	Baller Blockin'

== Guest appearances ==
- 1997: "Get Your Shine On"; "Don't Hate Me"; "Stay N Line Hoe" (B.G feat. Big Tymers)
- 1998: "Flossin' Season" (Juvenile feat. Big Tymers, B.G. & Lil' Wayne)
- 1998: "Off Top" (Juvenile feat. Big Tymers)
- 1999: "Intro" (Lil' Wayne feat. Big Tymers)
- 1999: "Loud Pipes" (Lil' Wayne feat. B.G., Big Tymers, Juvenile)
- 1999: "Young Playa" (Lil' Wayne feat. Big Tymers)
- 1999: "Not Like Me" (Lil' Wayne feat.B.G., Paparue, Big Tymers)
- 1999: "The Hood (It's All Good)" (Hot Boys & Big Tymers) [The Wood OST]
- 1999: "Something Got 2 Shake" (Juvenile feat. Big Tymers)
- 1999: "Never Had Shit" (Juvenile feat. B.G., Turk & Big Tymers)
- 1999: "Lil Boyz" (Juvenile feat. Big Tymers & Lil Wayne)
- 1999: "With the B.G"; 'Made Man" (B.G feat. Big Tymers)
- 1999: "Geto Starz" (C-Note feat. Big Tymers)
- 1999: "Tuesdays & Thursdays"; "I Need a Hot Girl" (Hot Boys featuring Big Tymers)
- 1999: "Hypnotize Cash Money" (Tear da Club up Thugs feat. Big Tymers, Hot Boys)
- 1999: "Bling Bling" (B.G feat. Juvenile, Lil Wayne, Turk & Big Tymers)
- 1999: "Rock Ice" (Big Tymers & Hot Boys) [Blue Streak OST]
- 1999: "Ballers" (Cash Money Remix) (Project Pat feat. Big Tymers, Hot Boys & Tear Da Club Up Thugs)
- 1999: "Hope You Niggaz Sleep" (The Notorious B.I.G. featuring Big Tymers & Hot Boyz)
- 1999: "Good Friday" (Big Tymers, Mack 10 & Lil Wayne) [Next Friday OST]
- 2000: "Project Bitch" (Big Tymers, Juvenile, Lil Wayne)
- 2000: "Let Us Stunt" (Big Tymers) [Baller Blockin' OST]
- 2000: "Change the World" (B.G. feat. Big Tymers, Juvenile & Lil Wayne)
- 2000: "Hennessy & XTC" (B.G feat. Big Tymers)
- 2000: "Lil' One"; "Break Me Off"; "Let's Go" (Lil Wayne feat. Big Tymers)
- 2000: "Pimps, Playas 'N' Hustlers" (Chino Nino feat. Big Tymers)
- 2000: "Millionaire" (DJ Clue feat. Big Tymers, Hot Boys) [Backstage OST]
- 2001: "Get Your Hustle On" (Juvenile feat. Big Tymers, B.G. & Lil Wayne)
- 2001: "They Lied"; "Be Gone" (Juvenile feat. Big Tymers)
- 2001: "You Can't Break Me" (Big Tymers) [Hardball OST]
- 2001: "That Bitch Is Bad"; "King Pin Dream"; "So Serious" (Mack 10 feat. Big Tymers)
- 2001: We Can Never Be Friends" (Mack 10 feat. Big Tymers, Lac & Stone)
- 2001: "Murder" (Mack 10 feat. Big Tymers & Turk)
- 2002: "Way of Life" (Lil Wayne feat. Big Tymers & TQ)
- 2002: "Fuck You" (Lil Wayne feat. Big Tymers)
- 2002: "We Drop It" (Big Tymers) [Undisputed OST]
- 2002: "Party Like a Thug" (Tank feat. Big Tymers)
- 2002: "Give It Back" (Toni Braxton feat. Big Tymers)
- 2003: "Perfect Timing" (Boo & Gotti feat. Big Tymers, Mikkey)
- 2005: "We Getting It On" (Birdman feat. Mannie Fresh, TA)
