= Nick Cannon discography =

The discography of Nick Cannon, an American rapper, comedian, and actor, consists of five studio albums, a compilation album, a comedy album, two mixtapes, and 17 singles. His self-titled debut studio album, Nick Cannon, was released on December 9, 2003, via Jive Records. Upon its release, the album has peaked at number 83 on the US Billboard 200 and number 15 on the Top R&B/Hip-Hop Albums, in which has sold over 200,000 certified units. His second studio album, White People Party Music, was released on April 1, 2014, via N'Credible Entertainment. Upon its release, the album has failed to emulate similar success of its predecessor by not entering charts.

From 2018 to 2022, Cannon would release three more albums: Calling All Models: The Prequel on June 1, 2018, The Miseducation of the Negro You Love to Hate on January 13, 2020 and The Explicit Tape: Raw & B on May 20, 2022.

Cannon's comedy album, Mr. Showbiz, was released on May 14, 2011, via New Wave Dynamics and has charted on the Top Comedy Albums chart at 3rd and the Top R&B/Hip-Hop Albums at 66th. His following mixtape, Child of the Corn, failed to chart in any country while his most recent mixtape The Gospel of Ike Turn Up: My Side of the Story, was released on November 16, 2016. His debut album spawned two singles, "Feelin' Freaky" and "Gigolo", that had charted on the national chart of the United States, which is the Billboard Hot 100, at 92nd and 24th, respectively.

== Studio albums ==
List of Studio albums, with selected chart positions
| Title | Album details | Peak chart positions | | Sales |
| Title | Album details | US | US R&B | Sales |
|---|---|---|---|---|
| Nick Cannon | Released: December 9, 2003; Label: Jive Records; Formats: CD, download, LP | 83 | 15 | US sales: 201,000 |
| White People Party Music | Released: April 1, 2014; Label: N'Credible Entertainment; Formats: CD, download, LP | — | — | |
| Calling All Models: The Prequel | Released: June 1, 2018; Label: Csalohcin WorldWide, N'Credible Entertainment; Formats: download, MP3 | — | — | |
| The Miseducation of the Negro You Love to Hate | Released: January 13, 2020; Label: Csalohcin WorldWide; Formats: download, MP3 | — | — | |
| The Explicit Tape: Raw & B | Released: May 20, 2022; Label: N'Credible Entertainment, EMPIRE; Formats: download, MP3 | — | — | |

== Compilation albums ==
| Year | Title |
|---|---|
| 2014 | Nick Cannon Presents Wild 'N Out: Compilation Vol. 1 (with Various artist): Released: January 28, 2014; Label: N'Credible, RED; Formats: CD, MD, LP |

== Comedy albums ==
List of Comedy albums, with selected chart positions
| Title | Album details | Peak chart positions | |
| Title | Album details | US Comedy | US R&B |
|---|---|---|---|
| Mr. Showbiz | Released: May 14, 2011; Label: New Wave Dynamics; Formats: CD, MD, LP | 3 | 66 |

== Mixtapes ==
Nick Cannon's mixtapes and details
| Title | Mixtape details |
|---|---|
| Child of the Corn | Released: December 6, 2011 |
| The Gospel of Ike Turn Up: My Side of the Story | Released: November 16, 2016 |

== Singles ==
=== As lead artist ===
List of singles as lead artist, with selected chart positions, showing year released and album name
| Title | Year | Peak chart positions | | | Album |
| Title | Year | US | US R&B/HH | US Rap | Album |
|---|---|---|---|---|---|
| "Parents Just Don't Understand" (featuring Lil Romeo and 3LW) | 2001 | — | — | — | Jimmy Neutron: Boy Genius OST |
| "Your Pops Don't Like Me (I Really Don't Like This Dude)" | 2003 | — | — | — | Nick Cannon |
| "Feelin' Freaky" (featuring B2K) | 2003 | 92 | 46 | — | Nick Cannon |
| "Gigolo" (featuring R. Kelly) | 2003 | 24 | 21 | 9 | Nick Cannon |
| "Shorty (Put It on the Floor)" (with Busta Rhymes, Chingy, and Fat Joe) | 2003 | — | 101 | — | Love Don't Cost a Thing OST |
| "Get Crunk Shorty" (featuring Ying Yang Twins and Fatman Scoop) | 2004 | — | — | — | Nick Cannon and My Brother & Me |
| "Can I Live?" (featuring Anthony Hamilton) | 2005 | — | 85 | — | Non-album singles |
| "It's Your Birthday" (featuring Fatman Scoop) | 2006 | — | — | — | Non-album singles |
| "My Wife" (featuring Slim of 112) | 2006 | — | — | — | Non-album singles |
| "Dime Piece" (featuring Izzy) | 2006 | — | 70 | — | Non-album singles |
| "Famous" (featuring Akon) | 2011 | — | — | — | White People Party Music |
| "Me Sexy" | 2013 | — | — | — | White People Party Music |
| "Dance Floor" | 2013 | — | — | — | White People Party Music |
| "Looking for a Dream" | 2014 | — | — | — | White People Party Music |
| "Pajama Pants" (featuring Future, Migos, and Traphik) | 2015 | — | — | — | White People Party Music |
| "If I Was Your Man" (featuring Jeremih) | 2016 | — | — | — | The Gospel of Ike Turn Up: My Side of the Story |
| "Hold On" | 2016 | — | — | — | Non-album single |
"—" denotes a single that did not chart or was not released in that territory.
