= List of Billboard number-one R&B albums of 1994 =

The following is a list of the Billboard magazine R&B albums that reached number one in 1994:

== Chart history ==
| Issue date | Album | Artist |
|---|---|---|
| January 1 | Doggystyle | Snoop Doggy Dogg |
| January 8 | Doggystyle | Snoop Doggy Dogg |
| January 15 | Doggystyle | Snoop Doggy Dogg |
| January 22 | Diary of a Mad Band | Jodeci |
| January 29 | Diary of a Mad Band | Jodeci |
| February 5 | 12 Play | R. Kelly |
| February 12 | 12 Play | R. Kelly |
| February 19 | 12 Play | R. Kelly |
| February 26 | 12 Play | R. Kelly |
| March 5 | 12 Play | R. Kelly |
| March 12 | 12 Play | R. Kelly |
| March 19 | 12 Play | R. Kelly |
| March 26 | 12 Play | R. Kelly |
| April 2 | 12 Play | R. Kelly |
| April 9 | Above the Rim | Soundtrack/Various artists |
| April 16 | Above the Rim | Soundtrack/Various artists |
| April 23 | Above the Rim | Soundtrack/Various artists |
| April 30 | Above the Rim | Soundtrack/Various artists |
| May 7 | Above the Rim | Soundtrack/Various artists |
| May 14 | Above the Rim | Soundtrack/Various artists |
| May 21 | Above the Rim | Soundtrack/Various artists |
| May 28 | Above the Rim | Soundtrack/Various artists |
| June 4 | Above the Rim | Soundtrack/Various artists |
| June 11 | Nuttin' But Love | Heavy D & the Boyz |
| June 18 | Above the Rim | Soundtrack/Various artists |
| June 25 | Regulate...G Funk Era | Warren G |
| July 2 | Regulate...G Funk Era | Warren G |
| July 9 | Regulate...G Funk Era | Warren G |
| July 16 | Get Up on It | Keith Sweat |
| July 23 | Get Up on It | Keith Sweat |
| July 30 | Funkdafied | Da Brat |
| August 6 | We Come Strapped | MC Eiht featuring Compton's Most Wanted |
| August 13 | We Come Strapped | MC Eiht featuring Compton's Most Wanted |
| August 20 | We Come Strapped | MC Eiht featuring Compton's Most Wanted |
| August 27 | We Come Strapped | MC Eiht featuring Compton's Most Wanted |
| September 3 | We Come Strapped | MC Eiht featuring Compton's Most Wanted |
| September 10 | Changing Faces | Changing Faces |
| September 17 | II | Boyz II Men |
| September 24 | II | Boyz II Men |
| October 1 | Rhythm of Love | Anita Baker |
| October 8 | Rhythm of Love | Anita Baker |
| October 15 | Rhythm of Love | Anita Baker |
| October 22 | Rhythm of Love | Anita Baker |
| October 29 | Jason's Lyric | Soundtrack/Various artists |
| November 5 | Murder Was the Case | Soundtrack/Various artists |
| November 12 | Murder Was the Case | Soundtrack/Various artists |
| November 19 | Murder Was the Case | Soundtrack/Various artists |
| November 26 | The Icon Is Love | Barry White |
| December 3 | Tical | Method Man |
| December 10 | Dare Iz a Darkside | Redman |
| December 17 | My Life | Mary J. Blige |
| December 24 | Miracles: The Holiday Album | Kenny G |
| December 31 | Miracles: The Holiday Album | Kenny G |

== See also ==
- 1994 in music
- R&B number-one hits of 1994 (USA)
