= Troy Johnson (producer) =

American songwriter, record producer

- Also known as: Lil Troy, R8DIO, Treezah
- Born: Troy L. Johnson
- Occupations: Songwriter; record producer; mixer

Troy L. Johnson, sometimes also credited as Lil Troy or R8DIO, is an American songwriter, record producer, and music executive.

== Career ==
Born in the 1980s and raised in Southern California, Johnson is the son of George Johnson, one half of American funk and R&B duo The Brothers Johnson. Exposed to the technical aspects of music production from an early age through his father's career, Johnson began making music with his then-partner Brycyn Evans via Nature's Finest Productions. Together, the duo produced remixes for Shaggy and secured a deal with Quincy Jones III, through Evans' connection. Through their manager, Jay Brown, an executive at Elektra Records, Johnson and Evans contributed as producers to the soundtrack of Backstage, the 2000 documentary directed by Chris Fiore, producing the song “Wanna Take Me Back” for Tionne "T-Boz" Watkins.

Following these early placements, Johnson worked with additional urban artists and collaborated with producers such as Missy Elliott. After the passing of Evans in 2000, Johnson continued developing projects independently. After signing with his first publisher, Valerie Bisharat, Johnson connected with Mathew Knowles and his daughter Solange, resulting in collaborations that appeared on her debut album Solo Star (2002), as well as on Kelly Rowland's debut solo album Simply Deep. He later became an in-house songwriter and producer for Will Smith at the Boom Boom Room in Burbank, California, contributing to Smith's 2005 album Lost and Found.

== Written and produced songs ==
Name of song, featured performers, originating album, year released and specified role.
Year	Title	Artist	Album	Songwriter	Producer	Ref(s).
2000	"Ladies Man"	Changing Faces	Visit Me	check	check	
2000	"Wanna Take Me Back"	Tionne "T-Boz" Watkins	Backstage: Music Inspired by the Film	check	check	
2001	"Wore Out Your Welcome"	Allure	Sunny Days	check	check	
2001	"2Moro"	Lil' Mo	Based on a True Story	check	check	
2002	"So Be It"	Solange	Solo Star	check	check	
2002	"Obsession"	Kelly Rowland	Simply Deep	check	check	
2002	"Simply Deep"	Kelly Rowland	Simply Deep	check	check	
2002	"Big Spener"	Tweet	Southern Hummingbird	check	check	
2003	"Lac Dogs & Hogs"	Changing Faces	Wooden Leather	check	check	
2004	"Losin' My Mind"	En Vogue	Soul Flower	check	check	
2004	"The Movement"	Michelle Williams	Do You Know	check	check	
2007	"End of the World"	Blake Lewis	A.D.D. (Audio Day Dream)	check	check	
2009	"Undone"	Backstreet Boys	This Is Us	check	check	
2009	"Powerless"	Kristinia DeBarge	Exposed	check	check	
2011	"Until It Beats No More"	Jennifer Lopez	Love?	check	check	
2013	"Eve"	Eve	Lip Lock	check	check	
2014	"Checkmate"	Jesse McCartney	In Technicolor	check	check	
2014	"Punch Drunk Recreation"	Jesse McCartney	In Technicolor	check	check	
2016	"Don't You Wait"	Solange Knowles	A Seat at the Table		check	
2018	"In Too Deep"	Why Don't We	8 Letters	check	check	
