= Stunna =

Stunna may refer to:

- Stunna 4 Vegas (born 1996), American rapper
- Stunna Gambino (born 2001), American rapper
- Young Stunna (born 1997), South African singer
- Birdman (rapper), also known as Stunna

== See also ==
- "#1 Stunna", a 2000 song by Big Tymers
- "Stunnah", a 2013 song by Nicole Richie
