= The Black Widow (album) =

Studio album by Strings
- Recorded: 1998–2000
- Genres: Hip hop; midwest hip hop; dirty rap
- Length: 47:46
- Labels: Sweat; Epic
- Producers: David McPherson (Ex); Keith Sweat (Ex); Steve "Stone" Huff; Swizz Beatz; Mannie Fresh

Singles from The Black Widow
- 1. "Tongue Song" Released: July 14, 2000

Professional ratings
Review scores
Source	Rating
Allmusic	2.5/5 stars

The Black Widow is the debut unreleased album by American rapper Strings. The album was to be her official solo debut album (after the cancellation of her other album, with Rockland Records). After her departure from R. Kelly's label, she was signed to Keith Sweat's label in 1998 and recorded most of her songs the year for her album. The album spawned a total of two singles, but only "Tongue Song" managed to chart. Because of the lack of charting performance from her singles and with no promotion from her label, the album was shelved; only the Listening Post Edition (promo CD) and sampler copies were pressed and for sale on Amazon and Discogs.

== Singles ==
The album's lead single, "Tongue Song", peaked at number 24 on Bubbling Under R&B/Hip-Hop Songs, number 13 on Hot Rap Songs and number 30 on Hot R&B/Hip-Hop Singles Sales chart.

The second single from the album, "Raise It Up", did not chart.

== Track listing ==
No.	Title	Producer(s)	Length
1.	"Intro"	Steve Huff	0:47
2.	"Um'" (featuring Swizz Beatz)	Swizz Beatz	2:48
3.	"Tongue Song"	Steve Huff	3:28
4.	"Hey Ya" (featuring Juvenile & Turk & Lil Wayne)	Steve Huff	4:26
5.	"Kitty"	Steve Huff	3:52
6.	"V.I.P."	Steve Huff	4:04
7.	"Raise It Up" (featuring Drag-On)	Swizz Beatz	3:53
8.	"Blunt Object"	Steve Huff	3:46
9.	"Table Dance"	Steve Huff	3:56
10.	"Vaginarobics 101 (Interlude)"	Steve Huff	2:20
11.	"Fatability"	Steve Huff	4:10
12.	"Treason"	Swizz Beatz	4:09
13.	"Pimp Up, Hoes Down" (featuring Infamous Syndicate)	Steve Huff	4:03
14.	"Cash Money"	Mannie Fresh	3:57
15.	"If You Don't Know"	Steve Huff	4:13
