= Keep It Right Here =

Keep It Right Here may refer to:

- a song on Solo's 1995 eponymous album
- a song on Survivor's 1986 album When Seconds Count

== See also ==
- Keep It Right There (disambiguation)
