= Told You So (Sparkle album) =

Studio album by Sparkle
- Released: October 24, 2000
- Recorded: 2000
- Genre: R&B
- Length: 48:36
- Label: Motown
- Producer: Steve "Stone" Huff

Sparkle chronology
Sparkle (1998)	Told You So (2000)

Professional ratings
Review scores
Source	Rating
AllMusic	2.5/5 stars

Told You So is the second album by American R&B singer Sparkle. It was released on October 24, 2000, by Motown.

Told You So peaked at number 121 on the Billboard 200 and number 31 on the Top R&B/Hip-Hop Albums chart. The album's lead single, "It's a Fact", reached number 62 on the Hot R&B/Hip-Hop Singles & Tracks chart.

== Production ==
Coming off her successful debut for Interscope, Sparkle began to have creative differences with her former mentor and the album's producer, R. Kelly. The conflict resulted in Sparkle eventually being released from her contract and signing with Motown. Told You So was produced by Steve "Stone" Huff.

== Critical reception ==
The Morning Call wrote: "For the most part, Told You So is hardly remarkable, the unintentionally ridiculous handwringing on 'The Ghetto' nothwithstanding, and Sparkle seems destined to fade soon enough."

== Track listing ==
1. "Don't Know Why" – 3:52
2. "The Ghetto" – 4:35
3. "It's a Fact" – 4:14
4. "Lovin' a Man" – 3:39
5. "Into My Life" – 3:55
6. "When a Woman's Heart Is Broken" – 4:21
7. "Good Life" – 4:20
8. "All I Want" – 4:29
9. "Somebody Else" – 4:02
10. "Everything" – 4:56
11. "Games" – 3:53
12. "Never Can Say Goodbye" – 4:17
13. "Good Life" (Remix) (featuring Memphis Bleek) (Bonus Track) – 4:37
