= Strings (rapper) =

American rapper

- Also known as: Tateeze
- Born: Marinna Louise Teal; November 25, 1975 (age 50); Chicago, Illinois, U.S.
- Genres: Midwestern hip-hop
- Occupations: Rapper; singer; songwriter; dancer; actress; jeweler
- Years active: 1995–present
- Labels: Rockland (1995–1997); Epic (1998–2000); Cash Money (2002–2005)

Marinna Louise Teal (born November 25, 1975), better known by her stage names Strings and Tateeze, is an American rapper and jeweler. She is best known for her appearances on the remixes of R. Kelly's 1997 single "Gotham City" and Keith Sweat's 1999 single "I'm Not Ready". Often considered a protégé of both singers, she signed with the former's Rockland Records in 1995 and the latter's Sweat Records in 1998. Her 2000 single, "Tongue Song", entered the Hot Rap Songs chart and was intended to lead her debut album, The Black Widow, which was never released. She was the second female artist to sign with Cash Money Records in 2002.

== Early life ==
Strings is the granddaughter of Aaron Moore, a famous bluesman from Chicago. As a young girl Strings sang in her local church choir and won talent show prizes, but her aspirations to become a rapper were put on hold after she became pregnant at 13 years old. After graduating from Chicago Vocational High School she moved to Oklahoma City for five years, where she became an exotic dancer to support her daughter.

== Music career ==
While living in Oklahoma City, Strings attended an R. Kelly concert where she auditioned for him backstage. After Kelly asked her fly to Miami to record her music, Strings signed to his label Rockland Records and appeared on R. Kelly's "Gotham City Remix". She also performed vocals on his self titled album and appeared on Sparkle's "Vegas". Strings later left Rockland because they did not release her solo album then signed a deal to Keith Sweat's record label Epic in 1998.

In 1999 Strings released "Raise It Up", and "Tongue Song" in 2000, which sampled Sisqo's hit "Thong Song". Tongue Song charted at number 24 on the Billboard Bubbling Under R&B/Hip-Hop Singles chart and number 13 on Billboard Hot Rap Singles chart. The song received regular airplay on East Coast radio stations, and Strings performed two singles on Soul Train and BET Live from LA. An album was scheduled to be released in November 2000 but was shelved, and only the Listening Post Edition and sampler copies were pressed. Strings was later released from her contract with Epic.

After Strings signed to Cash Money Records, she changed her stage name to Tateeze. She was featured on the Big Tymers single "Oh Yeah!" (2002). She planned to release another solo project under their label, but due to Hurricane Katrina it was never released, and two weeks later she left the label.

In 2011 Strings released her debut Mixtape entitled High Maintenance Music 101 The Mixx Education of Strings.

== Discography ==
=== Albums ===
- 2000: The Black Widow

=== Singles ===
==== 1990s ====
Year	Single	Chart positions		Album
Year	Single	U.S. Bub.	U.S. Rap	Album
1999	"Raise It Up"	—	—	The Black Widow
2000	"Tongue Song"	24	13	The Black Widow

==== 2000s ====
Year	Single	Chart positions			Album
Year	Single	US Hot 100	R&B	Rap	Album
2002	"Oh Yeah!" (Big Tymers feat. Tateeze & Boo & Gotti)	46	23	13	Hood Rich
2002	"Do That..." (Baby feat. P. Diddy, Mannie Fresh & Tateeze)	46	23	13	Hood Rich
2004	"Jeet Lo Dil" (Euphoria)	—	—	—	—
2005	"Conversation" (Mannie Fresh feat. Tateeze)	—	91	—	The Mind of Mannie Fresh

=== Album appearances ===
- 1998: "Vegas" Sparkle - Sparkle
- 1999: "Im Not Ready Remix" Keith Sweat - Im Not Ready
- 2000: "Whatcha Like" Keith Sweat - Didn't See Me Coming
- 2002: "Get That Dough" Lil Wayne - 500 Degreez
- 2002: "." Baby - Birdman
- 2002: "Oh Yeah!" Big Tymers - Hood Rich
- 2003: "Beat It Up" Big Tymers - Big Money Heavyweight
- 2003: "Chi-Town" Boo & Gotti - Perfect Timing
- 2004: "Beat It Up" Big Tymers - No Love (Beautiful Life)
- 2004: "Shake That A**" Mannie Fresh - The Mind of Mannie Fresh
- 2005: "Smoke Out" - Birdman - Fast Money
- 2005: "Addiction" - Kanye West - Late Registration
- 2009: "Dope Money" D Boyz - Life Of A D-Boy

=== Mixtapes ===
List of mixtapes, with year released
Title	Album details
High Maintenance Music 101 The Mixx Education of Strings	Released: 2011; Label: Self-released; Format: Digital download
