= Be Careful (Sparkle song) =

1998 single by Sparkle

Single by Sparkle featuring R. Kelly

from the album Sparkle
- Released: April 28, 1998
- Length: 5:17
- Label: Interscope; Rockland
- Songwriter: R. Kelly
- Producer: R. Kelly

Sparkle singles chronology
"Be Careful" (1998)	"Time to Move On" (1998)

R. Kelly singles chronology
"Gotham City" (1997)	"Be Careful" (1998)	"Friend of Mine" (remix) (1998)

"Be Careful" is a song by American singer Sparkle, released as her debut single and as the lead single from her first album, Sparkle (1998). The song reached number three on the US Billboard Rhythmic Top 40 chart and number one on the Billboard Hot R&B Airplay chart; it was ineligible to appear on the Hot R&B Singles and Hot 100 charts at the time because it was not released as a commercial single in the US. Internationally, "Be Careful" reached number four in the Netherlands and number seven in the United Kingdom.

== Background and promotion ==
The video, directed by R. Kelly, also features Kelly who wrote and produced the song. Five weeks after the song was released, it had already been played on the radio more than 40 million times in the US. Due to a Billboard rule, the song could not chart on the regular Billboard Hot 100 singles chart. The video shows a struggling African-American family.

== Track listing ==
European CD single

1. "Be Careful" (LP version) – 5:16
2. "Be Careful" (radio edit 1) – 5:18

== Charts ==
=== Weekly charts ===
Weekly chart performance for "Be Careful"
Chart (1998)	Peak position
Belgium (Ultratop 50 Flanders)	50
Canada Dance/Urban (RPM)	23
Europe (Eurochart Hot 100)	26
Germany (GfK)	52
Netherlands (Dutch Top 40)	4
Netherlands (Single Top 100)	4
Scottish Singles Sales (Official Charts)	43
UK Singles (Official Charts)	7
UK Dance (Official Charts)	11
UK Indie (Official Charts)	1
UK Hip Hop/R&B (Official Charts)	3
US Radio Songs (Billboard)	32
US R&B/Hip-Hop Airplay (Billboard)	1
US Rhythmic Airplay (Billboard)	3

=== Year-end charts ===
Year-end chart performance for "Be Careful"
Chart (1998)	Position
Netherlands (Dutch Top 40)	36
Netherlands (Single Top 100)	33
UK Singles (OCC)	180
US Hot R&B Airplay (Billboard)	17
US Rhythmic Top 40 (Billboard)	33

== Release history ==
Release dates and formats for "Be Careful"
Region	Date	Format(s)	Label(s)	Ref.
United States	April 28, 1998	Rhythmic contemporary radio	Interscope; Rockland	
United States	June 9, 1998	Contemporary hit radio	Interscope; Rockland	
United Kingdom	July 6, 1998	CD; cassette	Jive; Rockland	
