= Tongue Song =

2000 single by Strings

Single by Strings

from the album The Black Widow
- Released: July 4, 2000
- Recorded: 2000
- Genre: Hip hop
- Length: 3:30
- Label: Sweat, Epic
- Songwriter(s): Bob Robinson, Desmond Child, Marinna Teal, Mark Andrews, Robi Rosa, Steve Huff
- Producer(s): Steve Huff

Strings singles chronology
"Raise It Up" (1999)	"Tongue Song" (2000)	"Oh Yeah!" (2002)

"Tongue Song" is a song by American rapper Strings. Released as a single in July 2000, the song was supposed to be the lead single from Strings's debut album, "The Black Widow", but the album has never been released only the Listening Post Edition (Promo CD) and Sampler Copies were pressed. The single performed moderately on the east coast radio stations, peaking at twenty-four on Billboard's Bubbling Under R&B/Hip-Hop Songs and thirteen on the Hot Rap Songs as well.

== Commercial performance ==
The song "Tongue Song" by Strings has been listed for 14 weeks on the Billboard's Hot Rap Songs chart, a week on the Bubbling Under R&B/Hip-Hop Songs chat and 8 weeks on the Hot R&B/Hip-Hop Singles Sales chart.

== Track listings and formats ==
CD Single 2000

1. "Tongue Song" (LP Version) - 3:30
2. "Tongue Song" (Clean Version) - 3:29
3. "Tongue Song" (Instrumental) - 3:32
4. "Hey Ya" (LP Version) - 4:28
5. "Hey Ya" (Instrumental) - 4:28

U.S. Vinyl 2000

1. "Tongue Song" (Street Version) - 3:25
2. "Tongue Song" (Clean Version) - 3:28
3. "Tongue Song" (Instrumental) - 3:26
4. "Raise It Up" (LP Version) - 4:36
5. "Raise It Up" (Instrumental) - 6:01
6. "Don't Stop" (Clean Version) - 3:52

U.K. Promo CD 2000

1. "Tongue Song" (Clean Version) - 3:28
2. "Tongue Song" - 3:26

U.K. Promo Vinyl 2000

1. "Tongue Song"
2. "Tongue Song" (Clean)

== Charts ==
Chart (2000)	Peak position	Ref.
US Bubbling Under R&B/Hip-Hop Songs	24	
US Hot Rap Songs (Billboard)	13	
US Hot R&B/Hip-Hop Singles Sales (Billboard)	30	
