= Keep It Right There =

Keep It Right There may refer to:

- Keep It Right There (album), an album by Marion Meadows
- Keep It Right There (song), a song by Changing Faces
- "Keep It Right There", a song by Diana Ross on her album Take Me Higher
