= Sparkle (Sparkle album) =

Studio album by Sparkle
- Released: May 19, 1998
- Studio: Chicago Recording Company (Chicago)
- Genres: R&B; soul
- Length: 62:37
- Labels: Interscope; Rockland
- Producer: R. Kelly

Sparkle chronology
Sparkle (1998)	Told You So (2000)

Singles from Sparkle
- 1. "Be Careful" Released: March 23, 1998; 2. "Time to Move On" Released: 1998; 3. "Lovin' You" Released: 1998; 4. "What About" Released: 1998

Professional ratings
Review scores
Source	Rating
AllMusic	3/5 stars

Sparkle is the 1998 debut album by American singer Sparkle. It was released on May 19, 1998, through Rockland Records and was entirely produced by her former mentor R. Kelly. The album was a success in large part to the Sparkle–R. Kelly duet lead single "Be Careful", which peaked at number three on the US Rhythmic Top 40 and topped the US Hot R&B/Hip-Hop Airplay chart. The album itself peaked at number three on the Billboard 200 and was certified gold by the RIAA on December 7, 2000.

Further singles "Time to Move On" and "Lovin' You" were also released as singles, but did not make any Billboard charts.

== Critical reception ==
Entertainment Weekly gave the album a grade of B+, writing: "Unlike her wannabe-diva peers, this R. Kelly protegee remembers what the 'B' in R&B stands for....R. Kelly surrounds her with blaxploitation-vintage wah-wah guitars, haunting strings, and blue-collar blues; the resulting soul digs far deeper than Kelly's usual bump'n' grind".

== Track listing ==
All tracks written, produced and arranged by R. Kelly except track 10: written by Minnie Riperton and Richard Rudolph.

Sparkle track listing
No.	Title	Length
1.	"Good Life" (featuring Cam'ron and Nature)	3:46
2.	"Time to Move On"	4:03
3.	"Lean on Me"	4:22
4.	"I'm Gone"	5:14
5.	"Turn Away"	4:43
6.	"What About"	4:47
7.	"Be Careful" (featuring R. Kelly)	5:17
8.	"Nothing Can Compare"	4:09
9.	"Quiet Place (Prelude)"	1:39
10.	"Lovin' You"	4:08
11.	"Straight Up"	4:46
12.	"Vegas" (featuring Strings)	4:08
13.	"No Greater (Prelude)"	3:04
14.	"Play On"	5:07
15.	"Plenty of Good Lovin'"	3:24
Total length:		62:37

Samples

- "Time to Move On" samples from "Intimate Friends" by Eddie Kendricks.
- "Lovin' You" is a cover of "Loving You" by Minnie Riperton.
- "Good Life" samples from "Good Times" by Chic.

== Credits ==
- Jason Bacher – assistant engineer
- Percy Bady – keyboards
- Rick Behrens – assistant engineer, engineer, mixing assistant
- Chris Brickley – assistant engineer, engineer, mixing assistant, programming
- Cam'ron – rap vocals
- Lafayette Carthon, Jr. – keyboards
- Trey Fratt – assistant engineer
- Stephen George – engineer, mixing, programming
- Keith Henderson – guitar
- Cynthia Jernigan – backing vocals
- Mark Johnson – mixing assistant
- R. Kelly – arranger, executive producer, mixing, producer, vocals
- Jeff Lane – mixing assistant
- Ron Lowe – assistant engineer, engineer, mixing assistant
- Mr. Lee – mixing, programming
- Peter Mokran – head engineer, mixing, programmer
- Nature – rap vocals
- Joshua Shapera – engineer
- Sparkle – vocals
- Martin Stebbing – engineer, programming
- Ed Tinley – assistant engineer
- Poke & Tone – mixing
- Jeff Vereb – assistant engineer, mixing assistant

== Charts ==
=== Weekly charts ===
Weekly chart performance for Sparkle
Chart (1998)	Peak position
US Billboard 200	3
US Top R&B/Hip-Hop Albums (Billboard)	2

=== Year-end charts ===
Year-end chart performance for Sparkle
Chart (1998)	Position
US Billboard 200	126
US Top R&B/Hip-Hop Albums (Billboard)	26

== Certifications ==
Certifications for Sparkle
Region	Certification	Certified units/sales
United States (RIAA)	Gold	500,000^{^}
^{^} Shipments figures based on certification alone.
