= Changing Faces (Changing Faces album) =

Studio album by Changing Faces
- Released: August 23, 1994
- Genre: R&B
- Length: 59:04
- Labels: Big Beat; Atlantic
- Producers: Charnise Carter (exec.); Craig Kallman (exec.); Kenny "K-Smoove" Kornegay (also exec.); Dinky Bingham; Eric Codee; DeVante Swing; Dave Hall; Heavy D; Nevelle Hodge; R. Kelly; Poke; Darin Whittington; Darryl Young

Changing Faces chronology
Changing Faces (1994)	All Day, All Night (1997)

Singles from Changing Faces
- 1. "Stroke You Up" Released: July 14, 1994; 2. "Foolin' Around" Released: November 29, 1994; 3. "Keep It Right There" Released: March 14, 1995

Changing Faces is the debut studio album by American R&B duo Changing Faces. It was released by Big Beat and Atlantic Records on August 23, 1994, in the United States. Changing Faces peaked at twenty-five on the US Billboard 200. By October 1994, it was certified gold in sales by the Recording Industry Association of America (RIAA), after sales exceeding 500,000 copies in the United States.

== Critical reception ==
Professional ratings
Review scores
Source	Rating
AllMusic	4/5 stars
USA Today	2.5/4 stars

Allmusic editor Alex Henderson called's Changing Faces's debut "a pleasant, if less than spectacular, start [...] In fact, pretty much everything on this CD favors a medium tempo – the New York duo doesn't inundate the listener with either ultra-slow ballads or fast, danceable material. Cassandra Lucas and Charisse Rose, collectively Changing Faces, are competent singers and while slow jams like "Thoughts of You," "Movin' On," and "Come Closer" are neither mind-blowing nor distinctive, they're likable enough [...] Even though this slick debut isn't a gem, it let listeners know that Changing Faces had potential."

== Chart performance ==
The album peaked at twenty-five on the US Billboard 200 and topped the US Top R&B/Hip-Hop Albums. Changing Faces was certified gold by the Recording Industry Association of America (RIAA) in October 1994.

== Track listing ==
No.	Title	Writer(s)	Producer(s)	Length
1.	"Stroke You Up"	R. Kelly	R. Kelly	5:50
2.	"Foolin' Around"	R. Kelly	R. Kelly	4:27
3.	"Lovin' Ya Boy"	Kenny Kornegay; Cassandra Lucas; Charisse Rose	K-Smoove	4:02
4.	"One of Those Things"	Kornegay; Lucas; Rose	K-Smoove	3:59
5.	"Keep It Right There"	DeVante Swing	Swing	4:00
6.	"Am I Wasting My Time"	Dave Hall; Lucas; Rose	Hall	4:07
7.	"Feeling All This Love"	Kornegay; Lucas; Rose	K-Smoove; Daryl "88 Fingas" Young (co.)	3:47
8.	"Thoughts of You"	Darin Whittington; Lucas; Rose	D. Whittington	5:35
9.	"Come Closer"	Nevelle Hodge; Lucas; Rose	Hodge	5:16
10.	"Baby Your Love"	Dwight Myers; Lucas; Rose	Heavy D; Poke	4:20
11.	"Movin' On"	Kornegay; Lucas; Rose	K-Smoove	3:28
12.	"Good Thing"	Dinky Bingham; Eric Cody; Lucas; Rose	Bingham; CoDee	5:33
13.	"All Is Not Gone"	R. Kelly	R. Kelly	4:40

== Personnel ==
Information taken from Allmusic.

- assistant engineering – Jim Caruana, Gus Garcas, John Schriver, Joshua Shapera
- engineering – Dinky Bingham, Eric Codee, Russell Elevado, Paul Elliott, Steve George, Brian Hall, Dave Hall, Eric Lynch, Peter Mokran, Mario Rodriguez, Martin Stebbing, Jeff Stevenson
- executive production – Charnise Carter, Craig Kallman, Kenny "K-Smoove" Kornegay
- guitar – Keith Henderson
- keyboards – Darin Whittington
- mastering – Tom Coyne
- mixing – Tony Maserati, Peter Mokran, Jonnie Most, Jeff Stevenson
- mixing assistant – Dinky Bingham
- photography – Lisa Peardon
- piano – Lafayette Carthon, Jr.
- production – Dinky Bingham, Eric Codee, DeVante Swing, Dave Hall, Heavy D & the Boyz, Nevelle Hodge, Howard Perl, R. Kelly, Kenny "K-Smoove" Kornegay, Peter Mokran, Martin Stebbing, Darin Whittington, Darryl Young
- programming – Peter Mokran, Martin Stebbing
- vocals – Changing Faces

== Charts ==
=== Weekly charts ===
Chart (1994)	Peak position
US Billboard 200	25
US Top R&B/Hip-Hop Albums (Billboard)	1

=== Year-end charts ===
Chart (1994)	Position
US Top R&B/Hip-Hop Albums (Billboard)	63

== Certifications ==
Region	Certification	Certified units/sales
United States (RIAA)	Gold	500,000^{^}
^{^} Shipments figures based on certification alone.

== See also ==
- List of number-one R&B albums of 1994 (U.S.)
