= Still Fly =

Single by Big Tymers

from the album Hood Rich and Music From and Inspired by the Motion Picture xXx: A New Breed of Special Agent
- Released: March 4, 2002
- Recorded: 2001–2002
- Studio: Circle House Studios (Miami, FL)
- Genre: Hip hop
- Length: 5:35 (album version); 4:44 (radio version)
- Label: Cash Money; Universal
- Songwriters: Bryan "Baby" Williams; Byron O. Thomas; Alvin Nelson • Lac
- Producer: Mannie Fresh

Big Tymers singles chronology
"Number One Stunna" (2000)	"Still Fly" (2002)	"Oh Yeah!" (2002)

"Still Fly" is a single by American hip hop duo Big Tymers, released as the lead single from their 2002 album Hood Rich. It reached number 3 on the Hot Rap Tracks chart, number 4 on the Hot R&B/Hip-Hop Songs chart, and number 11 on the Billboard Hot 100 chart, making it their highest-charting and most successful song ever, and was also ranked #50 on the Billboard Year-End Hot 100 singles of 2002 chart. The song's chorus interpolates "The Ballad of Gilligan's Isle", the theme song from the sitcom Gilligan's Island.

In 2003, the song was nominated for a Grammy Award for Best Rap Performance by a Duo or Group at the 45th Annual Grammy Awards, but lost to Outkast's "The Whole World".

The book Thug Life: Race, Gender, and the Meaning of Hip-Hop by Michael P. Jeffries states the song "provides a poignant example of the stylin' and tension between lavish stylistic tastes and financial straits... the Big Tymers describe themselves as 'hood rich' by virtue of their abilities to style rather than how much wealth they possess."

In Yes We Can!: Improving Urban School Through Innovative Education Reform edited by Leanne Howell, Chance W. Lewis and Norvella Carter used the song as an example of "three excerpts from popular rap songs by African American male artists that appeared on the Billboard Hot 100 Singles Chart over the past few years illustrate the type of lifestyle that is often showcased and promoted in the media."

Greater Atlanta: Black Satire after Obama edited by Derek C. Maus and James J. Donahue states that "Big Tymers not only provided the language and template for stunting but also later illustrated, in Still Fly (2002), how rappers could still stunt even when they were broke. The entirety of Still Fly is a statement about faking a wealthy lifestyle..."

The song was covered by metalcore band The Devil Wears Prada in 2008 for the compilation album Punk Goes Crunk, and was also sampled by Canadian rapper Drake, who later would sign to Cash Money Records under Lil Wayne's Young Money Entertainment imprint. Additionally, the song was heavily sampled in the single "Fast Lane" by Don Toliver, Lil Durk, and Latto, which appears on the soundtrack to the 2021 film F9 and in the film's ending credits. The video to the song was directed by Terry Heller.

== Charts ==
=== Weekly charts ===
Chart (2002)	Peak position
US Billboard Hot 100	11
US Hot R&B/Hip-Hop Songs (Billboard)	4
US Hot Rap Songs (Billboard)	3
US Rhythmic Airplay (Billboard)	4

=== Year-end charts ===
Chart (2002)	Position
US Billboard Hot 100	50
US Hot R&B/Hip-Hop Songs (Billboard)	21

== Release history ==
Region	Date	Format(s)	Label(s)	Ref.
United States	March 4, 2002	Rhythmic contemporary radio	Cash Money, Universal	
