= White People Party Music =

Studio album by Nick Cannon
- Released: April 1, 2014
- Recorded: 2011–2014
- Genre: Hip hop; hip house; electro hop
- Length: 60:59
- Label: N'Credible; RED
- Producer: Nick Cannon

Nick Cannon chronology
Nick Cannon (2003)	White People Party Music (2014)

Singles from White People Party Music
- 1. "Me Sexy" Released: July 2, 2013; 2. "Dance Floor" Released: December 24, 2013; 3. "Looking for a Dream" Released: February 11, 2014

White People Party Music is the second studio album by American rapper, comedian, and actor Nick Cannon. It was released on April 1, 2014, by N'Credible Entertainment and distributed by RED Distribution. The album is the follow-up to his debut album Nick Cannon (2003).

The album was supported by three singles; "Me Sexy", "Dance Floor" (which heavily contains a sample of "Feelin' on Yo Booty" performed by R. Kelly), and "Looking for a Dream".

== Track listing ==
No.	Title	Length
1.	"Looking for a Dream" (featuring Afrojack)	4:20
2.	"Unbelievable"	3:09
3.	"America" (featuring Pitbull)	3:59
4.	"Pajama Pants" (featuring Future, Migos, and Traphik)	4:19
5.	"Dance Floor" (featuring Ryan Bowers and Kehlani)	4:45
6.	"OJ"	4:30
7.	"Phuckin' Awesome"	3:24
8.	"Birthday Interlude"	1:15
9.	"F**k Your Birthday" (featuring DJ Class and Fatman Scoop)	4:06
10.	"Stadium"	3:22
11.	"Pete's Rap"	1:12
12.	"Me Sexy"	4:07
13.	"White Lady"	3:44
14.	"Feel the Music" (featuring Colette Carr)	2:54
15.	"So Turned Up"	3:48
16.	"F**k Nick Cannon"	3:52
17.	"Famous" (featuring Akon)	4:11
