= I Got That Work =

Studio album by Big Tymers
- Released: May 16, 2000
- Genre: Southern hip-hop
- Length: 73:53
- Labels: Universal; Cash Money
- Producers: Mannie Fresh; Bryan "Baby" Williams (exec.); Ronald "Slim" Williams (exec.)

Big Tymers chronology
How You Luv That Vol. 2 (1998)	I Got That Work (2000)	Hood Rich (2002)

Singles from I Got That Work
- 1. "Get Your Roll On" Released: April 20, 2000; 2. "#1 Stunna" Released: June 7, 2000

Professional ratings
Review scores
Source	Rating
AllMusic	3.5/5 stars
Los Angeles Times	2/4 stars
RapReviews	8/10
The Rolling Stone Album Guide	2.5/5 stars
The Source	3.5/5 stars
Spin	7/10
USA Today	2.5/4 stars

I Got That Work is the third studio album by the American hip-hop duo Big Tymers. Originally scheduled for a February 8, 2000 release, it was ultimately released May 16, 2000, by Universal Records and Bryan "Baby" Williams' Cash Money Records. The album features the singles, "Get Your Roll On" and "#1 Stunna"; "#1 Stunna" was also featured on the stand-up comedy movie The Original Kings of Comedy's soundtrack.

== Commercial performance ==
I Got That Work debuted at #3 on the Billboard 200 with first-week sales of 187,000 copies in the US. For the week of June 24, 2000, the album charted at number 18 on the Billboard 200. The album received a platinum certification on September 15, 2000, by the Recording Industry Association of America for shipping and selling a million units in America.

== Track listing ==
All songs are produced by Mannie Fresh

No.	Title	Length
1.	"Big Tymers Intro (feat. Atrice & Lovely)"	1:55
2.	"Get Your Roll On"	4:02
3.	"Nigga Couldn't Know" (feat. Lil Wayne)	4:38
4.	"#1 Stunna" (feat. Lil Wayne & Juvenile)	4:41
5.	"Big Chief (Skit)" (feat. Ziggly Wiggly)	1:13
6.	"No, No" (feat. Lil Wayne)	4:08
7.	"We Ain't Stoppin" (feat. Hot Boys)	4:01
8.	"My Life" (feat. Hot Boys)	4:34
9.	"Sunday Night" (feat. Lil Wayne)	5:13
10.	"10 Wayz" (Mannie Fresh)	4:25
11.	"Hard Life" (feat. Lil Wayne & Juvenile)	4:37
12.	"Big Chief (Skit)"	1:28
13.	"We Hustle" (feat. B.G., Juvenile & Turk)	4:13
14.	"Pimp On" (feat. Unplugged)	4:43
15.	"Stuntastic" (feat. B.G. & Lil Wayne)	4:51
16.	"Rocky" (feat. Juvenile)	4:49
17.	"Big Tymers" (feat. Lac, Stone & B.G.)	5:24
18.	"Snake"	4:49

== Charts ==
=== Weekly charts ===
Chart (2000)	Peak position
US Billboard 200	3
US Top R&B/Hip-Hop Albums (Billboard)	1

=== Year-end charts ===
Chart (2000)	Position
US Billboard 200	65
US Top R&B/Hip-Hop Albums (Billboard)	16

== Certifications ==
Region	Certification	Certified units/sales
United States (RIAA)	Platinum	1,000,000^{^}
^{^} Shipments figures based on certification alone.

== See also ==
- List of Billboard number-one R&B albums of 2000
