= Oh Yeah! (Big Tymers song) =

2002 single by Big Tymers featuring Tateeze and Boo & Gotti

Single by Big Tymers featuring Tateeze and Boo & Gotti

from the album Hood Rich
- Released: March 12, 2002
- Genre: Hip hop
- Length: 4:39
- Label: Cash Money; Universal
- Songwriters: Bryan Williams; Byron Thomas; Sabrian Sledge; Mwata Mitchell
- Producer: Mannie Fresh

Big Tymers singles chronology
"Still Fly" (2002)	"Oh Yeah!" (2002)	"This Is How We Do" (2003)

Tateeze singles chronology
"Oh Yeah!" (2002)	"Do That..." (2002)

Boo & Gotti singles chronology
"Fiesta (Remix)" (2001)	"Oh Yeah!" (2002)	"Ain't It Man" (2003)

Music video
- "Oh Yeah!" on YouTube

"Oh Yeah!" is a song by American hip hop duo Big Tymers and the second single from their fourth studio album Hood Rich (2002). Produced by Mannie Fresh, it features American rapper Tateeze and American hip hop duo Boo & Gotti.

== Critical reception ==
In a review of Hood Rich, Steve "Flash" Juon of RapReviews commented about the production, "Try as hard as you want and you'll still be stuck looking for a weakness to the Big Tymers sound", citing the "catchy bounce" of "Oh Yeah!" as an example.

== Music video ==
The music video opens with a mock episode of MTV Cribs, featuring an appearance from Mannie Fresh's pet rat, named "Thug Love". It then shows Big Tymers on a yacht filled with women and heading to Hawaii.

== Charts ==
Chart (2002)	Peak position
US Billboard Hot 100	46
US Hot R&B/Hip-Hop Songs (Billboard)	23
US Hot Rap Songs (Billboard)	13
