= Keep It Right There (song) =

Single by Changing Faces

from the album Changing Faces
- Released: March 14, 1995
- Genre: R&B
- Length: 4:00
- Label: Big Beat/Atlantic
- Songwriter: DeVante Swing
- Producer: DeVante Swing

Changing Faces singles chronology
"Foolin' Around" (1994)	"Keep It Right There" (1995)	"We Got It Goin' On" (1995)

"Keep It Right There" is a song by American R&B duo Changing Faces recorded for their self-titled debut album Changing Faces (1994). The song was released as the third and final single for the album on March 14, 1995.

== Track listings ==
12", Vinyl

1. "Keep It Right There" (Original Mix) - 3:55
2. "Keep It Right There" (DeVante Swing Remix) - 3:25
3. "Keep It Right There" (Acapella) - 3:55
4. "Keep It Right There" (Salaam Remix) - 3:55
5. "Keep It Right There" (Salaam Remix Instrumental) - 4:01
6. "Keep It Right There" (DeVante Swing Remix Instrumental) - 3:24

== Personnel ==
Information taken from Discogs.

- assistant mix engineer: John Schriver
- assistant recording engineer: Gus Garcas
- executive production: Charnise Carter, Craig Kallman, Kenny "Smoove" Kornegay
- mix engineer: Tony Maserati
- mixing: Charles Alexander, Eddison Electrik, Gary Noble
- multi-instruments: DeVante Swing
- production: DeVante Swing
- recording engineers: Brian Hall, Mario Rodriguez
- remixing: Nicholas Brancker, DeVante Swing, Eddison Electrik, Salaam Remi
- writing: DeVante Swing

== Chart performance ==
Chart (1995)	Peak position
U.S. Hot R&B/Hip-Hop Singles & Tracks	49
