= All Day, All Night =

Studio album by Changing Faces
- Released: June 10, 1997
- Recorded: 1996–1997
- Genre: R&B
- Length: 59:55
- Label: Big Beat; Atlantic
- Producer: Allen Gordon, Jr.; Kiyamma Griffin; Jamey Jaz; Reese Johnson; R. Kelly; Ron Kilgore; Howard McCrary; Robert D. Palmer; Ronald Pitts; Darin Whittington; Bryce Wilson

Changing Faces chronology
Changing Faces (1994)	All Day, All Night (1997)	Visit Me (2000)

Singles from Changing Faces
- 1. "G.H.E.T.T.O.U.T." Released: April 8, 1997; 2. "All of My Days" Released: October 14, 1997; 3. "Time After Time" Released: 1998

All Day, All Night is the second studio album by American R&B duo Changing Faces. It was released by Big Beat and Atlantic Records on June 10, 1997, in the United States. The album was released after multiple soundtrack appearances by the group, including A Low Down Dirty Shame (1994), White Man's Burden (1995) and High School High (1996) and Space Jam (1996). All Day, All Night features the singles "G.H.E.T.T.O.U.T.," "All of My Days," and "I Got Somebody Else," the latter of which was featured on the High School High soundtrack. The album was certified gold by July 1997, having sold over 500,000 copies in the US alone.

== Critical reception ==
Professional ratings
Review scores
Source	Rating
AllMusic	4/5 stars

MacKenzie Wilson from Allmusic found that All Day, All Night "finds the group working a musical territory similar to their debut, namely smooth urban R&B with light hip-hop influences. Although the group's material is wildly uneven, the production is stylish and their vocals are strong, making the weak moments tolerable and the best songs quite attractive."

== Track listing ==
No.	Title	Writer(s)	Producer(s)	Length
1.	"Intro"			1:22
2.	"G.H.E.T.T.O.U.T."	R. Kelly	R. Kelly	4:28
3.	"My Lovely"	Jamey Jaz; Chris Bolden	Jaz	5:07
4.	"Thinkin' About You"	Bryce Wilson; Cassandra Lucas; Charisse Rose	Wilson	4:34
5.	"I Apologize"	Lucas; Rose; Ron Kilgore; Ronald Pitts	Kilgore; Pitts	4:00
6.	"Time After Time"	Cyndi Lauper; Rob Hyman	Robert Palmer; Howard McCrary	4:26
7.	"All of My Days" (featuring Jay-Z)	R. Kelly	R. Kelly	4:00
8.	"All Day, All Night"	R. Kelly	R. Kelly	3:55
9.	"G.H.E.T.T.O.U.T. (Part II)"	R. Kelly	R. Kelly	3:52
10.	"My Heart Can't Take Much More"	Palmer; Steve Kipner; Thomas Dawson; Sue Ann Carwell	Palmer	4:33
11.	"I Got Somebody Else"	Allen Gordon, Jr.; Andrea Martin; Ivan Matias; Joel Campbell	Gordon	4:15
12.	"Goin' Nowhere"	Lucas; Rose; Reese Johnson	Johnson	3:39
13.	"No Stoppin' This Groove"	Lucas; Rose; Reese Johnson	Johnson	3:55
14.	"All That"	Lucas; Rose; Kiyamma Griffin; Lawrence Parker	Griffin	3:52
15.	"Baby Tonight"	Darin Whittington; Felicia Adams; Tia Whittington	D. Whittington	4:17

== Charts ==
=== Weekly charts ===
Chart (1997)	Peak position
Canadian Albums (Billboard)	86
US Billboard 200	21
US Top R&B/Hip-Hop Albums (Billboard)	6

=== Year-end charts ===
Chart (1997)	Position
US Top R&B/Hip-Hop Albums (Billboard)	75

== Certifications ==
Region	Certification	Certified units/sales
United States (RIAA)	Gold	500,000^{^}
^{^} Shipments figures based on certification alone.
