= Stroke You Up =

1994 single by Changing Faces

Single by Changing Faces

from the album Changing Faces and A Low Down Dirty Shame
- Released: July 14, 1994
- Studio: Battery Studios; Chicago Recording Company
- Genre: R&B
- Length: 5:50
- Label: Big Beat/Atlantic
- Songwriter: R. Kelly
- Producer: R. Kelly

Changing Faces singles chronology
"Stroke You Up" (1994)	"Foolin' Around" (1994)

"Stroke You Up" is a song by American R&B duo Changing Faces that was recorded for their eponymous debut album (1994). The song was released as the album's debut single on July 14, 1994 by Big Beat/Atlantic. It features uncredited vocals from R. Kelly and was certified platinum by the RIAA and sold 700,000 copies domestically. A remix version was also written and produced by Kelly, which originally appeared on the soundtrack to the 1994 Keenen Ivory Wayans film A Low Down Dirty Shame.

== Critical reception ==
Alan Jones from Music Week described the song as "a groin-grinding slow jam created by R Kelly and sweetly sung by two femmes, with do you mind if I stroke you up/down lyrics. Top five in their native US." In his weekly dance column, James Hamilton from the Record Mirror Dance Update named it a "slinky girl duo's R. Kelly created typically blatant sexy 85.7bpm US smash, sure to get the juices flowing..."

== Track listings ==
- 12", 33 1/3 RPM, vinyl
1. "Stroke You Up" (LP Mix) – 4:32
2. "Stroke You Up" (Original Instrumental) – 4:32
3. "Stroke You Up" (Extended Remix) – 6:10
4. "Stroke You Up" (Remix Instrumental) – 6:10

== Personnel ==
Information taken from Discogs.

- assistant engineering – Martin Stebbing
- engineering – Peter Mokran, Joshua Shapera
- guitar – Keith Henderson
- mixing – Peter Mokran, R. Kelly
- piano – Lafayette Carthon
- production – R. Kelly
- vocals – Changing Faces
- writing – R. Kelly

== Charts ==
=== Weekly charts ===
Chart (1994)	Peak position
New Zealand (RIANZ)	15
UK Singles (OCC)	43
US Billboard Hot 100	3
US Hot Dance Music/Maxi-Singles Sales (Billboard)	9
US Hot R&B Singles (Billboard)	2
US Rhythmic (Billboard)	2
US Cash Box Top 100	8

=== Year-end charts ===
Chart (1994)	Position
Brazil (Mais Tocadas)	65
US Billboard Hot 100	44
US Hot R&B Songs (Billboard)	11
US Maxi-Singles Sales (Billboard)	48
US Cash Box Top 100	50
