= Visit Me =

Studio album by Changing Faces
- Released: October 10, 2000
- Genre: R&B
- Label: Atlantic
- Producer: Edmund Clement; Bryan-Michael Cox; Brycyn Evans; Derek Garrett; Kevin Hicks; Joe; Troy Johnson; Jonuz; R. Kelly; Malik Pendleton; Jazze Pha; Bryce Wilson

Changing Faces chronology
All Day, All Night (1997)	Visit Me (2000)

Visit Me is the third studio album by American R&B duo Changing Faces. It was released by Atlantic Records on October 10, 2000, in the United States. Members Cassandra Lucas and Charisse Rose worked with a variety of producers on the album, including R. Kelly, Bryan-Michael Cox, Jazze Pha, Bryce Wilson, and singer Joe. Guest vocalists include rappers Queen Pen and B.R.E.T.T., singer-producer Malik Pendleton, and singer Lil Mo.

Upon release, Visit Me earned generally positive reviews from music critics. It peaked at number 9 on the US Billboard Top R&B/Hip-Hop Albums and number 46 on the US Billboard Hot 100, their lowest entries on both charts up to then. The album spawned the singles "That Other Woman" and "Ladies' Man"; the former reached the top five of the US Dance Club Songs. The album also includes the first studio release of "Come Over." A version recorded by Aaliyah appeared on the singer's posthumous compilation album I Care 4 U (2002).

== Critical reception ==
Professional ratings
Review scores
Source	Rating
AllMusic	4/5 stars

MacKenzie Wilson from Allmusic found that the album "brings about more of a mature attitude and a sheer presentation of urban beats and classic R&B grooves. On Visit Me, Cassandra Lucas and Charisse Rose deliver another dose of sassy wit and hellcat rhythms. The 15-song set list featured on Visit Me is slightly vibrant [...] They do not hide anything, and that serves for a brash delivery alongside fellow female artists such as Toni Braxton, Whitney Houston, and Lil' Kim."

== Track listing ==
No.	Title	Writer(s)	Producer(s)	Length
1.	"Visit Me"	R. Kelly	R. Kelly	4:36
2.	"That Other Woman"	Joe Thomas; Joshua Thompson	Joe	4:44
3.	"Come Over"	Bryan-Michael Cox; Jazze Pha; Johnta Austin; Kevin Hicks	Cox; Pha; Hicks	3:56
4.	"Ladies Man"	Brycyn Evans; Cynthia Loving; Troy Johnson	Evans; Johnson	3:56
5.	"Baby You Ain't Got Me" (featuring Queen Pen)	Bryce Wilson; Loving; Lynise Walters	Wilson	4:09
6.	"Last Night" (featuring Lil Mo)	Cox; Loving; Sean Jasper	Cox	3:10
7.	"Be a Man"	Wilson; Cassandra Lucas; Darryl Brown	Wilson	4:30
8.	"Doin to Me" (featuring B.R.E.T.T.)	Wilson; Lucas; Charisse Rose; Brett Williams	Wilson	4:07
9.	"B***h"	Cheri Dennis; Malik Pendleton; Teron Beal	Pendleton	5:26
10.	"That Ain't Me"	Bryant Crockett; Kenny Greene; Pendleton	Pendleton; Crockett (co.)	5:03
11.	"Out of Sight" (featuring Malik Pendleton)	Lucas; Pendleton	Pendleton	4:05
12.	"I Told You (featuring Dave Hollister)"	Rose; Dave Hollister; John Bryan; Derek Garrett	Jonuz; Garrett	5:34
13.	"More Than a Friend"	Lucas; Rose; Edmund Clement	Clement	5:41
14.	"Don't Cry for Me"	Lucas; H. Middleton; J. Middleton; Beal	Middleton	4:31

Bonus track
No.	Title	Writer(s)	Producer(s)	Length
15.	"That Other Woman (Joe Remix)"	Thomas; Thompson	Joe	5:09

Japan bonus track
No.	Title	Writer(s)	Length
16.	"Just Us"	Eric Robinson; Victor Orsborn	4:23

== Charts ==
Chart (2000)	Peak position
US Billboard 200	46
US Top R&B/Hip-Hop Albums (Billboard)	9

== Release history ==
List of release dates, showing region, formats, and label
Region	Date	Format	Label
United States	October 10, 2000	CD; cassette	Atlantic Records
