= Foolin' Around (Changing Faces song) =

Single by Changing Faces

from the album Changing Faces
- Released: November 29, 1994
- Genre: R&B
- Length: 4:27
- Label: Big Beat/Atlantic
- Songwriter: R. Kelly
- Producer: R. Kelly

Changing Faces singles chronology
"Stroke You Up" (1994)	"Foolin' Around" (1994)	"Keep It Right There" (1995)

"Foolin' Around" is a song by American R&B duo Changing Faces which was recorded for their debut album, Changing Faces (1994). The song was both written and produced by R. Kelly and released as the album's second single in November 1994 by Big Beat/Atlantic.

== Track listings ==
- 12", vinyl
1. "Foolin' Around" (Extended Original Mix) – 4:27
2. "Foolin' Around" (Smoove's Remix) – 5:02
3. "Foolin' Around" (Instrumental) – 4:25
4. "Foolin' Around" (Whitehead's Remix) – 4:42
5. "Foolin' Around" (Big City Mix) – 4:57
6. "Foolin' Around" (Acapella) – 4:10
- CD, maxi
1. "Foolin' Around" (Extended Original Mix) – 4:30
2. "Foolin' Around" (Smoove's Remix) – 5:04
3. "Foolin' Around" (Whitehead's Remix) – 4:45
4. "Foolin' Around" (Big City Mix) – 4:59
5. "Foolin' Around" (Mokran's Short Mix) – 4:12
6. "Foolin' Around" (Instrumental) – 4:27
7. "Feelin' All This Love" (Remix)

== Personnel ==
Information taken from Discogs.

- additional production – Dave Bellochio, Michael Canter, Lafayette Carthon, Peter Mokran
- co-production – Darryl "88 Fingers" Young
- engineering – Paul "PE" Elliott, Stevo George, Peter Mokran
- guitar – Keith Henderson
- mixing – Peter Mokran, Jonnie Most
- piano – Lafayette Carthon
- production – R. Kelly, Kenny "Smooth" Kornegay
- remixing – Dave Bellochio, Michael Canter, Lafayette Carthon, Kenny "Smoove" Kornegay, Peter Mokran, Kenny Whitehead
- writing – R. Kelly, K. Kornegay, C. Lucas, C. Rose, D. Young

== Charts ==
Chart (1994)	Peak position
US Billboard Hot 100	38
US Hot Dance Music/Maxi-Singles Sales (Billboard)	24
US Hot R&B/Hip-Hop Singles & Tracks (Billboard)	9
US Rhythmic Top 40 (Billboard)	23
US Cash Box Top 100	46
