= G.H.E.T.T.O.U.T. =

1997 single by Changing Faces

Single by Changing Faces

from the album All Day, All Night
- B-side: "Goin' Nowhere"
- Released: April 22, 1997
- Length: 4:28
- Label: Big Beat; Atlantic
- Songwriter: R. Kelly
- Producer: R. Kelly

Changing Faces singles chronology
| "I Got Somebody Else" (1996) | "G.H.E.T.T.O.U.T." (1997) | "All of My Days" (1997) |

"G.H.E.T.T.O.U.T." (pronounced "Ghetto-u-t") is a song by American R&B duo Changing Faces. Released in 1997 from their second album, All Day, All Night (1997), and produced by R. Kelly, the single reached number eight on the US Billboard Hot 100 and spent four weeks at number one on the Billboard Hot R&B Singles chart. The song also became a top-10 hit in the United Kingdom and reached number 22 in New Zealand.

== Track listings ==
US CD and cassette single

1. "G.H.E.T.T.O.U.T." (single version)
2. "Goin' Nowhere" (album version)

US 12-inch single

A1. "G.H.E.T.T.O.U.T." (single version)
A2. "G.H.E.T.T.O.U.T." (instrumental)
B1. "G.H.E.T.T.O.U.T." (album version)
B2. "Goin' Nowhere" (album version)

UK CD and 12-inch single, Australian CD single

1. "G.H.E.T.T.O.U.T." (single version) – 4:08
2. "G.H.E.T.T.O.U.T." (album version) – 4:28
3. "G.H.E.T.T.O.U.T. Part II" (album version) – 3:52
4. "G.H.E.T.T.O.U.T." (instrumental) – 4:28
5. "G.H.E.T.T.O.U.T. Part II" (instrumental) – 3:52

UK cassette single

1. "G.H.E.T.T.O.U.T." (single version) – 4:08
2. "G.H.E.T.T.O.U.T. Part II" (album version) – 4:28

== Charts ==
=== Weekly charts ===
| Chart (1997) | Peak position |
|---|---|
| New Zealand (Recorded Music NZ) | 22 |
| Scotland Singles (OCC) | 42 |
| UK Singles (OCC) | 10 |
| UK Dance (OCC) | 10 |
| UK Hip Hop/R&B (OCC) | 3 |
| US Billboard Hot 100 | 8 |
| US Hot R&B Singles (Billboard) | 1 |
| US Maxi-Singles Sales (Billboard) | 31 |
| US Rhythmic Top 40 (Billboard) | 7 |

=== Year-end charts ===
| Chart (1997) | Position |
|---|---|
| US Billboard Hot 100 | 31 |
| US Hot R&B Singles (Billboard) | 3 |
| US Rhythmic Top 40 (Billboard) | 32 |

== Certifications ==
| Region | Certification | Certified units/sales |
|---|---|---|
| United States (RIAA) | Platinum | 1,200,000 |

== Release history ==
| Region | Date | Format(s) | Label(s) | Ref. |
|---|---|---|---|---|
| United States | March 31, 1997 | R&B radio | Big Beat; Atlantic | |
| United States | April 22, 1997 | CD; cassette | Big Beat; Atlantic | |
| United States | April 29, 1997 | Rhythmic contemporary radio | Big Beat; Atlantic | |
| United Kingdom | July 14, 1997 | 12-inch vinyl; CD; cassette | Big Beat; Atlantic | |

== See also ==
- R&B number-one hits of 1997 (USA)
