= Gangsta Girl =

2003 single by Big Tymers featuring R. Kelly

Single by Big Tymers featuring R. Kelly

from the album Big Money Heavyweight
- Released: 2003
- Length: 4:18
- Label: Cash Money; Universal
- Songwriters: Bryan Williams; Byron Thomas; Robert Kelly
- Producer: Mannie Fresh

Big Tymers singles chronology
"This Is How We Do" (2003)	"Gangsta Girl" (2003)	"No Love" (2004)

R. Kelly singles chronology
"Gigolo" (2003)	"Gangsta Girl" (2003)	"Happy People" (2004)

Music video
- "Gangsta Girl" on YouTube

"Gangsta Girl" is a song by American hip hop duo Big Tymers and the second single from their fifth studio album Big Money Heavyweight (2003). It features American singer R. Kelly and was produced by Mannie Fresh.

== Composition ==
The production of the song contains an "influence of Eastern themes and wind instruments". R. Kelly performs the chorus. In the lyrics, he sings about the types of girls he is attracted to, while Big Tymers rap about a lavish lifestyle.

== Critical reception ==
Steve "Flash" Juon of RapReviews gave a positive review, commenting that because of the production "combined with R. Kelly's unabashed sexuality singing the hook", the song is a "clear winner."

== Charts ==
Chart (2003–2004)	Peak position
US Billboard Hot 100	85
US Hot R&B/Hip-Hop Songs (Billboard)	38
US Hot Rap Songs (Billboard)	24
