= Hood Rich =

Studio album by Big Tymers
- Released: April 30, 2002
- Recorded: 2001–2002
- Genre: Southern hip-hop
- Length: 64:23
- Labels: Universal; Cash Money
- Producers: Mannie Fresh, Bryan "Baby" Williams (exec.), Ronald "Slim" Williams (exec.), Jazze Pha

Big Tymers chronology
I Got That Work (2000)	Hood Rich (2002)	Big Money Heavyweight (2003)

Singles from Hood Rich
- 1. "Still Fly" Released: March 4, 2002; 2. "Oh Yeah!" Released: 2002

Professional ratings
Review scores
Source	Rating
AllMusic	4/5 stars
The A.V. Club	favorable
Los Angeles Times	3/4 stars
RapReviews	7.5/10
The Rolling Stone Album Guide	3.5/5 stars

Hood Rich is the fourth studio album by American hip-hop duo Big Tymers. The album was released on April 30, 2002 by Universal Records and Baby's Cash Money Records. It features the single "Still Fly". It marks the first Big Tymers' album that doesn't feature exclusive production by Mannie Fresh.

The album debuted at number 1 on the Billboard 200 with first-week sales of 168,000 copies, becoming the first and only album by the group that reached the top spot on the chart. Hood Rich was certified Platinum by the RIAA.

== Track listing ==
All tracks produced by Mannie Fresh, except where noted.

No.	Title	Writer(s)	Producer(s)	Length
1.	"Slick Talkin' (Intro)" (featuring Lil Wayne)	Bryan Williams; Byron Thomas; Dwayne Carter		1:31
2.	"Oh Yeah!" (featuring Tateeze & Boo & Gotti)	B. Williams; Thomas; Sabrian Sledge; Mwata Mitchell		4:39
3.	"Still Fly"	B. Williams; Thomas		5:35
4.	"Sunny Day" (featuring TQ, Gotti & Mikkey)	B. Williams; Phalon Alexander; Terrance Quaites; Mitchell; Mikkel Nance	Jazze Pha	3:39
5.	"The Preppy Pimp"	Thomas; G. Green		2:15
6.	"Hello"	Thomas		3:37
7.	"#1" (featuring Lac)	B. Williams; Thomas		4:43
8.	"I'm Comin'" (featuring Mikkey, Gilly, Jazze Pha & TQ)	B. Williams; Thomas; Sar'd Nasir; Alexander; Quaites	Jazze Pha	3:59
9.	"Greg Street Countdown" (skit)	Thomas; Gregory Polk	Mannie Fresh; Greg Street	0:57
10.	"Gimme Some" (featuring TQ & Barewolf)	B. Williams; Thomas; Quaites; Terrence Williams		4:47
11.	"Big"			3:15
12.	"Get High" (featuring Jazze Pha)	B. Williams; Thomas; Alexander		4:01
13.	"Pimpin'" (featuring Lac)	B. Williams; Thomas		3:32
14.	"Put That Shit Up" (featuring Lac, Stone & Mikkey)	B. Williams; Thomas; Kendrick Moore; Alvin Nelson; Nance		4:02
15.	"Greg Street Stuntin'" (skit)	Thomas; Polk	Mannie Fresh; Greg Street	1:17
16.	"Da Man" (featuring Trick Daddy & TQ)	B. Williams; Thomas; Maurice Young		4:02
17.	"Lil Mama" (featuring Lac)	B. Williams; Thomas		4:13
18.	"Greg Street Radio" (skit)	Polk	Greg Street	1:03
19.	"My People" (featuring Boo)	B. Williams; Thomas		3:15

== Personnel ==
- Al Amporo – assistant engineer (1)
- Leslie Brathwaite – mixing (1, 4, 9, 10, 15, 18, 19)
- Kevin Crouse – engineer (2, 8, 10, 14, 16), mixing (2, 8, 14, 16)
- Eric Flettrich – engineer (3, 5, 6, 12, 13, 16, 17, 19), mixing (3, 5, 6, 12, 13, 17)
- Mannie Fresh – engineer (3, 5, 6, 12, 13, 16, 17, 19), mixing (3, 5, 6, 12, 13, 17)
- Mark "DJ Exit" Goodchild – engineer (4, 9, 10, 15)
- Steve Hardy – engineer (1)
- Steve Fisher – assistant engineer (2, 8, 10), assistant mix engineer (14, 16)
- Ismel "Nino" Ramos – engineer (9, 10, 15), assistant engineer (4), assistant mix engineer (4, 9, 10, 15, 18, 19)
- Dole "Rambro" Ramsey – engineer (4)
- Greg Street – engineer (18)
- Dave Swope – assistant engineer (7)
- Irving Taylor – assistant engineer (10)
- Chris Tice – engineer and mixing (7)
- Bryan Williams – executive producer
- Ronald Williams – executive producer
- Mike Wilson – engineer (10, 14)

== Charts ==
=== Weekly charts ===
Chart (2002)	Peak position
US Billboard 200	1
US Top R&B/Hip-Hop Albums (Billboard)	1

=== Year-end charts ===
Year-end chart performance for Hood Rich
Chart (2002)	Position
Canadian R&B Albums (Nielsen SoundScan)	143
Canadian Rap Albums (Nielsen SoundScan)	73
US Billboard 200	60
US Top R&B/Hip-Hop Albums (Billboard)	17

== Certifications ==
Region	Certification	Certified units/sales
United States (RIAA)	Platinum	1,000,000^{^}
^{^} Shipments figures based on certification alone.
