= Get Your Roll On =

2000 single by Big Tymers

Single by Big Tymers

from the album I Got That Work
- Released: April 20, 2000
- Recorded: 2000
- Genre: Southern hip hop
- Length: 3:51
- Label: Cash Money; Universal
- Songwriter(s): Bryan Williams; Byron Thomas
- Producer(s): Mannie Fresh

Big Tymers singles chronology
"Big Ballin" (1998)	"Get Your Roll On" (2000)	"Number One Stunna" (2000)

"Get Your Roll On" is a single by the Big Tymers, from their third studio album, I Got That Work. It reached #24 on the Billboard Hot R&B/Hip-Hop Singles & Tracks chart. The song is about driving expensive cars and consuming ecstasy at various dance club establishments.

== Charts ==
=== Weekly charts ===
Chart (2000)	Peak position
US Bubbling Under Hot 100 Singles (Billboard)	1
US Hot R&B/Hip-Hop Songs (Billboard)	24

=== Year-end charts ===
Chart (2000)	Position
US Hot R&B/Hip-Hop Songs (Billboard)	98
