= This Is How We Do (Big Tymers song) =

2003 single by Big Tymers

Single by Big Tymers

from the album Big Money Heavyweight
- Released: 2003
- Length: 4:31
- Label: Cash Money; Universal
- Songwriter(s): Bryan Williams; Byron Thomas
- Producer(s): Mannie Fresh

Big Tymers singles chronology
"Oh Yeah!" (2002)	"This Is How We Do" (2003)	"Gangsta Girl" (2003)

Music video
- "This Is How We Do" on YouTube

"This Is How We Do" is a song by American hip hop duo Big Tymers and the lead single from their fifth studio album Big Money Heavyweight (2003). It was produced by Mannie Fresh.

== Critical reception ==
The song contains an acoustic guitar in the instrumental. It has been described as "singsongy" and upbeat, with lyrics about living luxuriously.

== Charts ==
Chart (2003)	Peak position
US Billboard Hot 100	97
US Hot R&B/Hip-Hop Songs (Billboard)	53
