= Nick Cannon (album) =

Studio album by Nick Cannon
- Released: December 9, 2003
- Recorded: 2002–2003
- Genre: Hip hop
- Length: 49:16
- Labels: Nick; Jive
- Producers: Nick Cannon; Just Blaze; Sean Combs; R. Kelly; Kovas; Poke & Tone; Mario Winans

Nick Cannon chronology
Nick Cannon (2003)	White People Party Music (2014)

Singles from Nick Cannon
- 1. "Gigolo" Released: October 18, 2003; 2. "Your Pops Don't Like Me (I Really Don't Like This Dude)" Released: 2003; 3. "Feelin' Freaky" Released: 2003; 4. "Shorty (Put It on the Floor)" Released: 2003; 5. "Get Crunk Shorty" Released: 2004

Nick Cannon is the debut studio album by American rapper, comedian, and actor Nick Cannon. It was released on December 9, 2003 by Nick Records (a subsidiary of the cable network Nickelodeon) in partnership with Jive Records. The album features the single "Gigolo", which peaked at number 9 on the US Billboard Hot Rap Songs chart and number 24 on the Hot 100 in 2004.

== Critical reception ==
Professional ratings
Review scores
Source	Rating
AllMusic	3/5 stars
Common Sense Media	3/5 stars
Rolling Stone	2/5 stars

AllMusic editor Andy Kellman praised the first half of the album for containing guest contributions from producers and featured artists that help elevate Cannon as a credible artist but felt the second-half needed said contributions to make it memorable, concluding that "[A]s an MC, he has all the charisma necessary to be a venerable pop-rapper, but it's going to be a while before he can be in complete control." Jon Caramanica, writing for Rolling Stone, also praised the record's production on tracks like "Feelin' Freaky" and "Get Crunk Shorty" but found Cannon unconvincing in his lyrical delivery about the opposite sex on "My Rib" and "Gigolo", concluding that "he only proves that bravado needs to be earned, not splashed on like cheap cologne." Kathi Kamen Goldmark of Common Sense Media described the album as being "hip-hop lite", praising the production and star-studded contributions throughout the track listing, and singled out both "Whenever You Need Me" and "I Owe You" for having "surprising moments of sentimental tenderness."

== Track listing ==
No.	Title	Writer(s)	Producer(s)	Length
1.	"Get Crunk Shorty" (featuring Ying Yang Twins and Fatman Scoop)	Nick Cannon; Isaac Freeman; Pierre Jones; Justin Smith; Deongelo Holmes; Eric Jackson; Nona Hendryx	Just Blaze	4:09
2.	"Feelin' Freaky" (featuring B2K)	Cannon; R. Kelly; Samuel Barnes; Jean-Claude Oliver; F. Jones	Trackmasters; R. Kelly	3:35
3.	"Gigolo" (featuring R. Kelly)	Cannon; Kelly	R. Kelly	3:57
4.	"Whenever You Need Me" (featuring Mary J. Blige)	Cannon; Sean Combs; Mario Winans; Luigi Creatore; Hugo Peretti; George David Weiss	Mario Winans; Sean Combs	4:12
5.	"You"	Cannon; Kelly; Clifton Chase; Edward Fletcher; Melvin Glover; Sylvia Robinson	R. Kelly	4:38
6.	"I Used to Be in Love" (featuring Joe)	Cannon; Brian Stanley; E. Dixon; Charlie Harrison	Brian Stanley	3:38
7.	"My Rib"	Cannon; Deric Battiste; James Jones III; Darron Lilly; Darren Sherrill	Darren Sherrill; Darron Lilly; Deric Battiste; James Jones III	4:31
8.	"Attitude"	Cannon; Kovasciar Myvette; Clarence Hutchinson; Maurice Benjamin Cenac	Kovas	3:42
9.	"Main Girl" (featuring Nivea)	Cannon; Zukhan Bey; Narada Walden; Bunny Hull	Zukhan	4:41
10.	"My Mic" (featuring Biz Markie)	Cannon; Marcel Hall; Nick Loftin; Hutchinson	Nick "Fury" Loftin	3:52
11.	"I Owe You"	Cannon; Battiste; F. Moore; J. Morgan; Peter Ivers; John Lewis Parker	Deric Battiste	4:17
12.	"Your Pops Don't Like Me (I Really Don't Like This Dude)"	Cannon; Battiste; Moses Barrett III; Hutchinson; Larry Campbell; James Todd Smith; Dwayne Emil; Roger Troutman	Nick Cannon	3:57

Sample credits

- "Get Crunk Shorty" samples "Goin' On a Holiday", written by Nona Hendryx, as performed by Labelle.
- "Whenever You Need Me" samples "Love Is the Answer", written by Luigi Creatore, Hugo Peretti, and George David Weiss, as performed by The Stylistics.
- "You" contains a portion of "The Message", written by Clifton Chase, Edward Fletcher, Melvin Glover, and Sylvia Robinson, as performed by Grandmaster Flash and the Furious Five.
- "Attitude" contains a portion of "Jam on It", written by Maurice Benjamin Cenac.
- I Owe You" samples "Can't We Fall in Love Again", written by Peter Ives and John Lewis Parker, as performed by Phyllis Hyman.
- "Your Pops Don't Like Me (I Really Don't Like This Dude)" samples "Big Ole Butt", written by James Tood Smith and Dwayne Emil Simon, as performed by LL Cool J, and "More Bounce to the Ounce", written by Roger Troutman, as performed by Zapp.

== Charts ==
Chart (2003)	Peak position
US Billboard 200	83
US Top R&B/Hip-Hop Albums (Billboard)	15
