= Number One Stunna =

2000 single by Big Tymers

"#1 Stunna"

Single by Big Tymers featuring Lil Wayne and Juvenile

from the album I Got That Work
- Released: June 7, 2000
- Recorded: 2000
- Genre: Hip hop
- Length: 4:41
- Label: Cash Money; Universal
- Songwriters: B. Williams; B. Thomas; D. Carter; T. Gray
- Producers: Mannie Fresh; Bryan "Baby" Williams (exec.); Ronald "Slim" Williams (exec.)

Big Tymers featuring Lil Wayne and Juvenile singles chronology
"Get Your Roll On" (2000)	"#1 Stunna" (2000)	"Still Fly" (2002)

Lil Wayne singles chronology
"Tha Block Is Hot" (1999)	"Number One Stunna" (2000)	"Neva Get Enuf" (2002)

"#1 Stunna" is the second official single by the Big Tymers, from their third studio album, I Got That Work. The single was featured in the 2000 stand-up comedy film, The Original Kings of Comedy, and its stars Steve Harvey, D.L. Hughley, and Cedric the Entertainer appeared in the music video. In that same year, it placed at number 24, along with the other lead single, "Get Your Roll On", on the Billboard Hot R&B/Hip-Hop Singles & Tracks chart. "#1 Stunna" also contains verses from Lil Wayne and Juvenile.

== Charts ==
Chart (2000)	Peak position
US Bubbling Under Hot 100 (Billboard)	5
US Hot R&B/Hip-Hop Songs (Billboard)	24
