= Nick Cannon =

American comedian (born 1980)

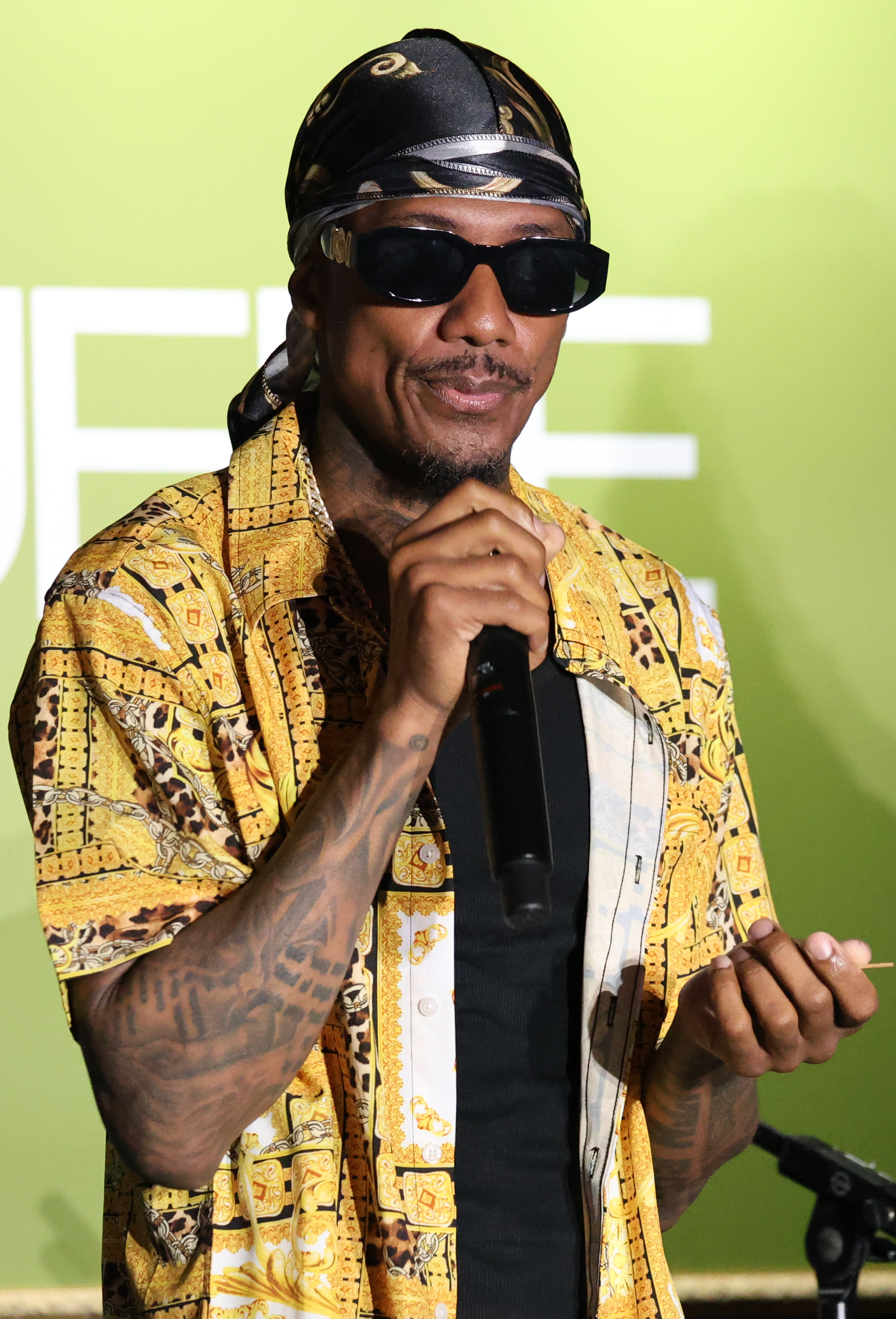
- Cannon in 2025
- Born: Nicholas Scott Cannon; October 8, 1980 (age 46); San Diego, California, U.S.
- Education: Howard University (BS)
- Occupations: Comedian; actor; rapper
- Years active: 1998–present
- Spouse: Mariah Carey (m. 2008; div. 2016)
- Children: 12
- Awards: Full list
- Musical career
- Genres: Pop rap; R&B
- Instrument: Vocals
- Labels: Republic; NCredible; Sony; RED; Columbia; Motown; Nick; Jive
- Member of: Da G4 Dope Bomb Squad
- Website: nickcannon.com

Nicholas Scott Cannon (born October 8, 1980) is an American comedian, actor, and rapper. He began his career on Nickelodeon's All That before going on to host Wild 'n Out, America's Got Talent, Lip Sync Battle Shorties, and The Masked Singer.

Cannon's 2003 single "Gigolo" (featuring R. Kelly) peaked within the top 30 of the Billboard Hot 100 and led his self-titled debut studio album. His second album White People Party Music (2014) was released by his NCredible Entertainment label.

== Early life ==
Cannon was born on October 8, 1980, in San Diego, California. He was largely raised by his paternal grandfather, whom both he and his biological father called "dad". As a child, he grew up in Lincoln Park's Bay Vista Housing Projects, a gang-ridden section of Southeast San Diego. While in his teenage years, Cannon was affiliated with the Lincoln Park Bloods street gang, but stated that he left behind his affiliations after losing a close friend. In 1998, he graduated from Monte Vista High School in Spring Valley, California, where he was president of the African Student Coalition and participated in track and field. Cannon received his first break doing stand-up comedy on his father's local cable public access TV program.

== Music career ==
=== 1999–2006: Music beginnings, Nick Cannon and Stages ===
As a teenager, Cannon was one-third of the rap group "Da G4 Dope Bomb Squad", they opened for the likes of Will Smith, LFO, 98 Degrees, and Montell Jordan.

After signing with Jive Records in 2001, he was featured alongside Romeo Miller and 3LW on the Jimmy Neutron: Boy Genius soundtrack with a cover of the 1988 hit song "Parents Just Don't Understand". His debut self titled album was released in 2003 and included the single "Your Pops Don't Like Me (I Really Don't Like This Dude)".

In 2005, Cannon formed his own record label, Can-I-Ball Records, with plans to release his second studio album, entitled Stages, later that year. The album's first single, "Can I Live?", an anti-abortion (pro-life) song, was released in July 2005 followed by the second single "Dime Piece" in March 2006. It was never released because of Cannon's acting career.

=== 2009–2012: NCredible Entertainment, Slick Nick and Child of the Corn ===
In 2009, Cannon formed a new label, NCredible Entertainment, after cancelling his old label Can-I-Ball Records. In 2010, Cannon created a parody of hip hop pioneer Slick Rick entitled "Slick Nick". He released two songs by the character such as "I'm a Slick Rick", a freestyle of Cali Swag District's "Teach Me How to Dougie" in which he attempted to diss hip hop mega-star Eminem, and "Nick's Story", a freestyle rap version of Slick Rick's "Children's Story". On December 6, 2011, Cannon released his debut mixtape entitled Child of the Corn.

=== 2013–present: White People Party Music and second mixtape ===
On July 26, 2013, Cannon premiered his new single "Me Sexy" and announced over seven years after the shelving of his album Stages that he was working on a new second studio album entitled White People Party Music featuring collaborations with Afrojack, Pitbull, Future and Polow da Don.

The album's second single "Looking for a Dream" was released on February 11, 2014. The song features Afrojack. The music video was released on VEVO on February 13.

On November 16, 2016, Cannon released his second mixtape The Gospel of Ike Turn Up: My Side of the Story. Prior to the release of the mixtape, a music video for the single "If I Was Your Man" was released on November 7, 2016.

On December 2, 2016, Cannon released a single called "Hold On" on iTunes.

Cannon released "The Invitation", an Eminem diss track, on December 9, 2019, as a response to Eminem's feature on Fat Joe and Dre's "Lord Above" dissing Cannon. The track featured former record producer and convicted felon Suge Knight, as well as rappers Hitman Holla, Charlie Clips and Prince Eazy, whom Cannon referred to as "The Black Squad". After Eminem responded to Cannon with two tweets, Cannon released a second diss track the next day featuring the same rappers as well as Conceited titled "Pray For Him", followed by another solo diss track entitled "The Invitation Canceled"

== Other ventures ==
=== Hosting ===
In 2005, Cannon created, produced, and hosted the MTV improv comedy series Wild 'n Out. That same year he hosted the so-called slime stunt on Nickelodeon's 2005 Kids' Choice Awards in which a human cannonball was shot into slime. In addition, he was the DJ on Ellen DeGeneres's Bigger, Longer, And Wider show. On December 11, 2009, Cannon hosted the Nickelodeon HALO Awards along with Justin Timberlake, Hayden Panettiere, LeBron James, Kelly Rowland and Alicia Keys.

In 2010, Cannon created and co-hosted the TeenNick original series The Nightlife.

On July 4, 2011, Cannon hosted the Nathan's Hot Dog Eating Contest, an annual American competitive eating competition.

On November 12, 2012, MTV2 announced the revival of Wild 'N Out. The revived show was produced by Cannon's NCredible Entertainment, the series premiered in 2013 with a few returning faces joined by a roster of fresh talents. When asked about the show coming back, Cannon said, "With our show's original cast, everyone from Kevin Hart to Katt Williams, Affion Crockett and Taran Killam becoming household names, I am looking forward to working with MTV2 as we work to introduce the biggest comedic stars of tomorrow with the return of Wild 'N Out."

Season 5 of the show premiered on July 9, 2013, to the highest ratings in MTV2 history. It was renewed for season 6 and 7, which aired in two blocks.

Meanwhile on December 1, 2012, Cannon would launch and host the TeenNick Top 10 on TeenNick as part of his executive role with the network. The program counted down ten popular videos of the week, often with Cannon's input also a part of the week's playlist. The series would air until March 17, 2018, when TeenNick phased out all original programming.

On November 4, 2013, Cannon was the master of ceremonies as well as an honoree at the annual Ebony Magazine Power 100 Awards. In 2014, he began hosting Caught on Camera with Nick Cannon on NBC.

On August 4, 2016, Wild 'N Out returned for its 8th season after three record-breaking seasons.

On February 3, 2021, Cannon tested positive for COVID-19, leading to Niecy Nash temporarily filling in for him during his quarantine during the fifth season of The Masked Singer. He returned to hosting duty after competing as the wild card contestant "Bulldog" in the fifth episode and was eliminated by Nash's choice. Cannon unmasked without the panelists having to make their final guesses.

In 2019, it was announced that Cannon would be debuting his own syndicated daytime talk show in 2020 via Lionsgate's Debmar-Mercury and Cannon's own production company, NCredible Entertainment. After taking a brief hiatus due to his controversy, the show, Nick Cannon, premiered on September 27, 2021, with the Fox Television Stations as a key group. The show was canceled in March 2022.

==== America's Got Talent and departure ====
From 2009 to 2016, Cannon served as the host of America's Got Talent. He announced he would not be back for 2017, citing creative differences between him and the executives of NBC. The resignation came in the wake of news that the network considered firing Cannon after he made disparaging remarks about NBC in his Showtime comedy special, Stand Up, Don't Shoot. "I love art and entertainment too much to watch it be ruined by controlling corporations and big business," Cannon said in a statement, referring to the cable giant Comcast's ownership of NBC. Cannon, however, was technically under contract to host America's Got Talent and could have been potentially sued by NBC for breach of contract, though this was considered unlikely. NBC executives did not accept his resignation and had been stated to be keeping their fingers crossed that he would instead choose to return. Cannon's resignation was ultimately accepted as final without further incident. He was replaced in his position as host of America's Got Talent by Tyra Banks, known for also having hosted America's Next Top Model.

=== Business ===
Following his role as host of the TEENick block, Cannon was the chairman of the TeenNick channel for Nickelodeon in 2009, as well as its development and creative consultant. In 2012, he created a sketch-comedy series, Incredible Crew, starring six teenagers as Cannon wrote and produced the theme song. The show was produced by Cartoon Network Studios, in association with NCredible Entertainment. The series aired 13 episodes before being canceled. As previously mentioned, he also hosted the network's TeenNick Top 10 video countdown program.

On November 30, 2012, a picture of Cannon was posted on the NCredible Entertainment website, which reported that Cannon signed a deal with NBCUniversal to produce scripted and unscripted material for the network.

In December 2015, Cannon was named "Chief Creative Officer" of RadioShack in hopes of catering to a younger crowd. According to the company this role involved "creating RadioShack-exclusive products and curating the in-store experience." They launched the NCredible line of consumer audio electronics the following February, starting with the NCredible1 Wireless Headphones.

=== Radio hosting ===
On January 19, 2010, Cannon hosted the morning show (6–10AM) with co-hosts Nikki and Southern Sarah Lee at 92.3 NOW FM (WXRK-FM) in New York. On February 17, 2012, he stepped down from 92.3 NOW citing health issues.

Cannon has a weekly chart program called Cannon's Countdown that is syndicated by CBS Radio.

Currently, Cannon hosts his own show "Nick Cannon Mornings" at Power 106 in Los Angeles. His show replaced J. Cruz's "The Cruz Show" in the 5am – 10am time slot after J. Cruz went over to urban contemporary hip hop iHeart Radio rival KRRL "Real 92.3" for their afternoon drive show.

=== Comedy ===
On July 13, 2010, Cannon announced that he was going on a comedy tour in fall 2010, beginning at the Just for Laughs festival in Montreal.

In early 2011, Cannon recorded his first stand-up comedy special titled Mr. Showbiz at the Palms Casino Resort in Las Vegas. The special premiered on Showtime on May 14, 2011. A digital release of Mr. Showbiz became available on iTunes beginning May 16, 2011, with a physical release of the album on May 31, 2011.

Cannon portrayed himself in the satirical reality series Real Husbands of Hollywood, which aired for five seasons from 2013 until 2015, as well as a miniseries revival in 2022.

Cannon was revealed to lead his own reality television series, Raising the Cannons, which depicts himself balancing his multiple children, families, health issues, and career. The show will premiere on December 18, 2026 on Netflix.

== Political views ==
Cannon is a supporter of Donald Trump and has stated that he has "some conservative views".

== 2020 antisemitism controversy ==
On July 14, 2020, Cannon was fired by ViacomCBS after making racist and antisemitic remarks during an episode of his podcast Cannon's Class with Professor Griff. Cannon endorsed conspiracy theories about Jewish control of finance, claimed that Jews had stolen the identity of "black people as the 'true Hebrews'", and cited Louis Farrakhan, who is labeled as an anti-Semite by the Poverty Law Center and Anti-Defamation League. Cannon also made black supremacist statements, calling white people "savages" who were "closer to animals", claiming the "only way that they can act is evil", citing the pseudoscientific melanin theory. A statement from ViacomCBS noted that the company's relationship with Cannon was terminated due to his promotion of "hateful speech and ... anti-Semitic conspiracy theories".

Two days later, Cannon released an apology only for his remarks regarding antisemitism, saying: "I want to assure my Jewish friends, new and old, that this is only the beginning of my education." He also demanded complete ownership of Wild 'n Out, and an apology from ViacomCBS for his termination. When Fox became aware of his podcast, the network immediately consulted him and accepted his public apology, allowing him to remain host of The Masked Singer. He donated his first paycheck to the Simon Wiesenthal Center in light of the incident. On February 5, 2021, ViacomCBS announced that Wild 'n Out would resume production with Cannon as host, saying that Cannon has "taken responsibility for his comments" and "worked to educate himself" through conversations with Jewish leaders.

== Personal life ==
Cannon graduated from Howard University in 2020 with a Bachelor of Science in Criminology/Administration of Justice and a minor in Africana Studies.

=== Health and illnesses ===
Cannon was hospitalized on January 4, 2012, for treatment of "mild kidney failure", and again on February 17, 2012, after a pulmonary embolism. On March 5, 2012, he announced that his kidney problems were due to lupus nephritis.

In November 2024, Cannon revealed he had been "clinically diagnosed" with narcissistic personality disorder, saying "I need help".

=== Relationships and children ===
In February 2007, Cannon met model Selita Ebanks. The couple got engaged with a public proposal at Times Square in May of the same year, but broke off the engagement by October.

Cannon married singer-songwriter Mariah Carey on April 30, 2008, at her private estate on Windermere Island in the Bahamas. On April 30, 2011, Carey gave birth to fraternal twins. After six years of marriage, the couple separated and Cannon filed for divorce in December 2014. Their divorce was finalized in 2016.

He has three children with model Brittany Bell: a son (born February 2017), a daughter (born December 2020) and another son (born September 2022).

Cannon and model Alyssa Scott had a son (born June 2021) who died of brain cancer at five months old, and a daughter (born December 2022). Cannon said he briefly experimented with celibacy in late 2021, during a bout with depression following the death of his son.

With Abby De La Rosa, he has twin sons (born June 2021) and a daughter (born November 2022).

Model and real estate agent Bre Tiesi gave birth to their son in June 2022.

In September 2022, model LaNisha Cole gave birth to their daughter.

== Discography ==
Studio albums

- Nick Cannon (2003)
- White People Party Music (2014)

== Filmography ==
=== Film ===
Year	Film	Role	Notes
2000	Whatever It Takes	Chess Club Kid	
2002	Men in Black II	MIB Autopsy Agent	
2002	Drumline	Devon Miles	
2003	Love Don't Cost a Thing	Alvin Johnson	
2004	Garfield: The Movie	Louis (voice)	
2004	Shall We Dance?	Scott	
2005	Underclassman	Tracy "Tre" Stokes	
2005	Roll Bounce	Bernard	
2006	The Adventures of Brer Rabbit	Brer Rabbit (voice)	
2006	Even Money	Godfrey Snow	
2006	Monster House	Officer Lester (voice)	
2006	Bobby	Dwayne	
2007	Weapons	Reggie	
2007	Goal II: Living the Dream	TJ Harper	
2008	American Son	Mike	
2008	Day of the Dead	Salazar	Video
2008	Ball Don't Lie	Mico	
2009	The Killing Room	Paul Brody	
2010	A Very School Gyrls Holla-Day	Robby Bottoms	TV movie
2012	Rags	Himself	TV movie
2014	Drumline: A New Beat	Devon Miles	TV movie
2014	School Dance	Super Sizer/Himself	
2015	Chi-Raq	Chi-raq	
2016	King of the Dancehall	Tarzan Brixton	
2019	Berserk	Raffy Rivers	
2020	She Ball	Avery Watts	
2021	The Misfits	Ringo	
2021	Miracles Across 125th Street	Basie/Murda Count	TV movie

=== Television ===
Year	Title	Role	Notes
1998	Sports Theater with Shaquille O'Neal	Clay Jackson	Episode: "Scrubs"
1998–1999	Kenan & Kel	-	Recurring Cast: Season 3
1998–2005	All That	Himself/Cast Member	Main Cast: Season 5-6, Guest: Season 8-10
1999	Cousin Skeeter	Little Rick	Episode: "Bowled Over"
2000	The Parkers	Garland	Episode: "Big is Beautiful"
2001–2002	Taina	Alex	Guest Cast: Season 1–2
2002	Hollywood Squares	Himself/Panelist	Recurring Panelist
2002–2003	The Nick Cannon Show	Himself	Main Cast
2003	Soul Train	Himself	Episode: "Nick Cannon/Javier"
2003	It's Showtime at the Apollo	Himself	Episode: "Murphy Lee/Meli'sa Morgan/Nick Cannon"
2004	Chappelle's Show	Himself	Episode: "Wayne Brady & Tyrone Biggums's Fear Factor"
2004	MTV Cribs	Himself	Episode: "November 21, 2004"
2005	Soul Train Music Awards	Himself/Co-Host	Main Co-Host
2005	MTV Spring Break	Himself/Host	Main Host
2005	106 & Park Top 10 Live	Himself/Guest Host	Recurring Guest Host
2005	Mad TV	Himself	Episode: "Episode 11.1"
2005	Poorman's Bikini Beach	Himself	Episode: "Episode 7.4"
2005–present	Wild 'n Out	Himself/Host	Main Host
2006	Celebrity Undercover	Himself	Episode: "Nick Cannon's Spring Break Dime Piece Search"
2006	The Andy Milonakis Show	Himself	Episode: "Episode 2.3"
2006	In the Mix	Himself	Episode: "Episode 3.4"
2006	Fuse Celebrity Playlist	Himself	Episode: "Nick Cannon"
2006	America's Next Top Model	Himself	Episode: "The Girl with Two Bad Takes"
2007	Nick Cannon Presents: Short Circuitz	Himself/Host	Main Host
2007	Teen Choice Awards	Himself/Host	Main Host
2007	Crank Yankers	Himself (voice)	Episode: "Episode 4.8"
2009	Party Monsters Cabo	Himself	Episode: "Nick Cannon"
2009	Black to the Future	Himself	Episode: "Hour 4: The 00s"
2009	Denise Richards: It's Complicated	Himself	Episode: "Denise Does Slamdance"
2009	Yes We Will! BET's Inaugural Celebration	Himself/Host	Main Host
2009–2013	Disney Parks Christmas Day Parade	Himself/Co-Host	Main Co-Host
2009–2016	America's Got Talent	Himself/Host	Main Host: Season 4–11
2009–2017	Nickelodeon HALO Awards	Himself/Host	Main Host
2010	VH1 Rock Docs	Himself	Episode: "Soul Train: The Hippest Trip in America"
2010	Undateable	Himself	Main Guest
2010	Colette Carr: Life in the Day	Himself	Recurring Cast
2010	Just for Laughs	Himself	Episode: "Episode 2.7"
2010	Movers & Changers	Himself	Episode: "Presentation Day"
2010	The Nightlife	Himself/Co-Host	Main Co-Host
2011	The Marriage Ref	Himself/Panelist	Episode: "Nick Cannon, Patti Labelle, Ali Wentworth"
2011	Up All Night	Calvin	Recurring Cast: Season 1
2011	The Talk	Himself/Guest Host	Episode: "Episode 1.96"
2012	30 Rock	Himself	Episode: "The Ballad of Kenneth Parcell"
2012	Punk'd	Himself/Guest Host	Episode: "Nick Cannon"
2012	Mash Up	Himself	Episode: "Episode 1.1"
2012–2013	Incredible Crew	Himself/Announcer	Main Announcer
2013	Family Guy	Himself (voice)	Episode: "No Country Club for Old Men"
2013	Secret Millionaires Club	Himself (voice)	Episode: "Avast Ye Downloads!"
2013	Betty White's Off Their Rockers	Himself	Episode: "Episode 2.10"
2013	Big Time Rush	Himself	Episode: "Big Time Dreams"
2013	Hollywood Game Night	Himself/Panelist	Episode: "America's Got Game Night"
2013–2016	Real Husbands of Hollywood	Himself	Main Cast
2014	Project Runway All Stars	Himself/Guest Judge	Episode: "Fashion Cents"
2014	Love & Hip Hop: New York	Himself	Episode: "All Good Things..."
2014	Spoilers	Himself	Episode: "Celebrities React to Viral Videos"
2014	America's Next Top Model	Himself	Episode: "The Girl Who Got Five Frames"
2014	Deal with It	Himself	Guest Cast: Season 2–3
2014	Mission: 4Count	Himself	Recurring Cast
2014	People Magazine Awards	Himself/Host	Main Host
2014–2015	Brooklyn Nine-Nine	Marcus	Recurring Cast: Season 2, Guest: Season 3
2014–2016	Caught on Camera with Nick Cannon	Himself/Host	Main Host
2014–2017	TeenNick Top 10	Himself/Host	Main Host
2015	Make It Pop	Himself	Episode: "XO-IQ"
2015	Love & Hip Hop: Hollywood	Himself	Episode: "About a Boy"
2016	Jay Leno's Garage	Himself	Episode: "Supercars"
2016	Wild 'N on Tour	Himself	Episode: "All Good Things..."
2016	MTV's Epic Fails	Himself/Host	Main Host
2016–2019	Lip Sync Battle Shorties	Himself/Co-Host	Main Co-Host
2017–2018	Superstar Slime Showdown at Super Bowl	Himself/Co-Host	Main Co-Host
2018	The Hollywood Puppet Show	Himself	Episode: "Nick Cannon and Lilly Singh"
2018	Teen Choice Awards	Himself/Co-Host	Main Co-Host
2018	Uncensored	Himself	Episode: "Nick Cannon"
2019	Drop That Seat	Himself	Episode: "Episode 1.1"
2019	UnMade	Himself	Episode: "Nick Cannon's "Cannon's Away"
2019	Larry King Now	Himself/Guest Host	Recurring Guest Host: Season 7
2019	The Wendy Williams Show	Himself/Guest Host	Recurring Guest Host: Season 11
2019–present	The Masked Singer	Himself/Host	Main Host
2020	The Real Housewives of Beverly Hills	Himself	Episode: "Mind Your P's and BBQ's"
2020	Celebrity Call Center	Himself	Episode: "The Shift With the Gen X Tik Tok"
2020	Becoming	Himself	Episode: "Nick Cannon"
2021	Hip Hop Uncovered	Himself	Episode: "Victory Lap"
2021	Soul of a Nation	Himself	Episode: "Faith"
2021–2022	Nick Cannon	Himself/Host	Main Host
2021–2022	Entertainment Tonight	Himself/Guest Host	Recurring Guest Host: Season 41
2022	Phat Tuesdays	Himself	Main Guest
2022	Real Husbands of Hollywood: More Kevin, More Problems	Himself	Main Cast
2022	Urban Eats and Treats	Himself	Episode: "Nick Cannon"
2022	The Checkup with Dr. David Agus	Himself	Episode: "Nick Cannon"
2023	Celebrity Prank Wars	Himself/Host	Main Host
2023	Black Pop: Celebrating the Power of Black Culture	Himself	Main Guest
2023	Claim to Fame	Himself	Episode: "Needle in a Haystack"
2023	Beat Shazam	Himself/Host	Main Host: Season 6
2024	Bad Vs. Wild	Himself/Host	Main Host
2024	Counsel Culture	Himself/Host	Main Host
2024	I Can See Your Voice	Himself/Guest Host	Episode: "Episode 3.11" & "3.12"
2024	The West Coast Hustle	Himself	Episode: "In My Mom Era"
2024	Wish List Games	Himself/Host	Main Host
2024	Nick Cannon's Big Drive	Himself/Host	Main Host
2024	Accused	Marcus Paul	Episode: "Marcus' Story"
2026	Wonka's The Golden Ticket	Himself/Host	Main Host

=== Music videos ===
Year	Artist	Title	Role
2002	Aaliyah	"Miss You"	Himself
2003	Nivea	"Laundromat"	Himself
2003	R. Kelly	"Ignition (Remix)"	DJ
2004	Lil' Romeo	"My Cinderella"	Himself
2005	50 Cent	"Disco Inferno"	Himself
2008	Will.i.am	"Yes We Can"	Himself
2008	Mariah Carey	"Bye Bye"	Himself
2008	Mariah Carey	"I Stay in Love"	Driver
2009	Mariah Carey	"Love Story"	Himself
2010	Mariah Carey featuring Nicki Minaj	"Up Out My Face"	Himself
2011	Mariah Carey & John Legend	"When Christmas Comes"	Himself

=== Comedy releases ===
Year	Title
2011	Nick Cannon: Mr. Show Biz
2017	Nick Cannon: Stand Up, Don't Shoot

== Awards and nominations ==
Year	Result	Award	Category	Film or series
2003	Nominated	Black Reel Awards	Best Breakthrough Performance — Viewer's Choice	Drumline
2006	Nominated	Black Reel Awards	Best Ensemble	Roll Bounce (Shared with cast)
2006	Won	Hollywood Film Festival	Ensemble of the Year	Bobby (Shared with cast)
2001	Nominated	Nickelodeon Kids' Choice Awards	Favorite Television Actor	All That
2002	Won	Nickelodeon Kids' Choice Awards	Favorite Television Actor	The Nick Cannon Show
2003	Nominated	Nickelodeon Kids' Choice Awards	Favorite Television Actor	The Nick Cannon Show
2003	Nominated	MTV Movie Awards	Breakthrough Male Performance	Drumline
2003	Nominated	MTV Movie Awards	Best Kiss	Drumline (Shared with Zoe Saldaña)
2007	Nominated	Screen Actors Guild Awards	Outstanding Performance by a Cast in a Motion Picture	Bobby (Shared with cast)
2003	Nominated	Teen Choice Awards	Choice Movie Actor — Drama/Action Adventure	Drumline
2003	Nominated	Teen Choice Awards	Choice Movie Breakout Star — Male	Drumline
2004	Nominated	Teen Choice Awards	Choice Movie Liplock	Love Don't Cost a Thing (Shared with Christina Milian)
2004	Nominated	Teen Choice Awards	Choice Movie Liar	Love Don't Cost a Thing
2004	Nominated	Teen Choice Awards	Choice Movie Chemistry	Love Don't Cost a Thing (Shared with Christina Milian)
2006	Nominated	Teen Choice Awards	TV — Choice Personality	Nick Cannon Presents Wild 'n Out
2007	Nominated	Teen Choice Awards	TV — Choice Personality	Nick Cannon Presents Wild 'n Out
2012	Won	NAACP Image Awards	Outstanding Supporting Actor	Up All Night
2022	Nominated	Golden Raspberry Awards	Worst Supporting Actor	The Misfits
