= Gigolo (Nick Cannon song) =

2003 single by Nick Cannon

Single by Nick Cannon featuring R. Kelly

from the album Nick Cannon
- Released: October 18, 2003
- Recorded: 2002
- Genre: Pop rap; R&B
- Length: 4:00
- Label: Jive
- Songwriters: Robert Kelly; Nicholas Cannon
- Producer: R. Kelly

Nick Cannon singles chronology
"Feelin' Freaky" (2003)	"Gigolo" (2003)	"Can I Live?" (2005)

R. Kelly singles chronology
"Step in the Name of Love (Remix)" (2003)	"Gigolo" (2003)	"Gangsta Girl" (2003)

"Gigolo" is a song by American actor, comedian, and rapper Nick Cannon featuring vocals and sole production from R. Kelly. It was released on October 18, 2003 as the third single from the former's self-titled debut studio album. The remix features E-40 and Murphy Lee.

"Gigolo" peaked at number nine on the Hot Rap Tracks chart, and number 24 on the Billboard Hot 100 chart. As of 2025, it is Cannon's highest-charting entry on the latter chart, and the first of his two entries on the chart in his career. The Erik White-directed music video features Katt Williams and DJ D-Wrek in cameo appearances. Cannon has since expressed regret and apologized for working with Kelly, since the January 2019 airing of the Lifetime television documentary Surviving R. Kelly, which depicted graphic revelations of sexual abuse by the singer.

== Charts ==
=== Weekly charts ===
Chart (2003–2004)	Peak position
US Billboard Hot 100	24
US Hot R&B/Hip-Hop Songs (Billboard)	21
US Hot Rap Songs (Billboard)	9
US Pop Airplay (Billboard)	20

=== Year-end charts ===
Chart (2004)	Position
US Billboard Hot 100	80
US Hot R&B/Hip-Hop Songs (Billboard)	92

== Release history ==
Region	Date	Format(s)	Label(s)	Ref.
United States	January 26, 2004	Contemporary hit radio	Jive	
