= Sparkle (singer) =

American R&B singer

- Also known as: Sparkle
- Born: Stephanie Edwards; May 13, 1975 (age 50); Chicago, Illinois, U.S.
- Genres: R&B
- Occupation: Singer
- Years active: 1998–present
- Labels: Rockland; Interscope; Motown; DNA; Avace
- Producer(s): R. Kelly

Stephanie Edwards (born May 13, 1975), known professionally as Sparkle, is an American R&B singer from Chicago, Illinois. She began her career in 1998 as a protégé of producer R. Kelly. Sparkle is best known for her 1998 debut single "Be Careful", which peaked at number 7 on the UK singles chart.

== Career ==
Sparkle first started singing in her family's gospel music group. Sparkle met singer R. Kelly in 1989. Sparkle was the first and only successful artist to release an album on Kelly's Rockland label. Sparkle's début album, the self-titled Sparkle, was released on May 19, 1998. The album debuted at No. 3 on the Billboard 200 and No. 2 on the R&B chart and was certified gold soon after its release. The album is best known for the single "Be Careful", a 1998 duet with R. Kelly, which charted on two of Billboard's major airplay charts, peaking at No. 3 on the Rhythmic Top 40 and at No. 1 on Billboard's Hot R&B Airplay chart for six consecutive weeks, while also reaching No. 7 in the UK. Despite the success of her debut album, Sparkle and R. Kelly began to have creative differences while working on her second album, which led to her asking to be released from Rockland/Interscope. She then signed with Motown, where she would release her second album Told You So in 2000. However, the album did not do as well because of lack of promotion, only making it to 121 on the Billboard 200, while scoring a minor hit with the single "It's a Fact". On August 13, 2012, Sparkle released her first music video in 12 years called "So Bad"; however, the single was not available for purchase on iTunes or any digital music outlet.

== Works ==
Sparkle has worked with several artists, including Aaliyah (backing vocals on Age Ain't Nothing but a Number album), R. Kelly on R; Mary J. Blige on Share My World; Wyclef Jean on "Loving You Remix"; Avant on the remix of "Separated" which features Kelly Rowland; Joe on "Woman's Heart", Jimmy Sommers; and Tank. Sparkle also has sung background vocals for Toni Braxton in her Las Vegas stage show Toni Braxton Revealed.

== Personal life ==
In 2002, the Chicago Police and a writer for the Chicago Sun Times showed Sparkle a videotape allegedly of her young niece, then approximately 14, and R. Kelly engaging in sexual acts. Sparkle identified the young girl as her niece. Sparkle testified against R. Kelly in a subsequent criminal trial on charges of child pornography in 2008. However, in the end, the jury found Kelly not guilty in the case. Years later, her niece testified against R. Kelly. In 2022, her niece (referred to as "Jane" in court documents) claimed her aunt Sparkle introduced her and her parents to Kelly

== Discography ==
=== Albums ===
Year	Album	Peak chart positions		Certifications
Year	Album	US	US R&B	Certifications
1998	Sparkle: Released: May 19, 1998; Label: Interscope	3	2	RIAA: Gold
2000	Told You So: Released: October 24, 2000; Label: Motown	121	31	

=== Singles ===
- "Be Careful" (featuring R. Kelly) (1998)
- "Time to Move On" (1998)
- "What About" (1998)
- "Lovin You" (1999)
- "It's a Fact" (2000)
- "Good Life" (2001)
- "So Bad" (2012)
- "We Are Ready" (2018)
- "Easy" (2020)
- "Open Letter" (2021)
