= Rockland Records =

American record label

- Parent company: Universal Music Group
- Founded: 1997; 29 years ago
- Founder: R. Kelly
- Distributor: Interscope Records
- Genre: R&B; hip hop; pop
- Country of origin: United States

Rockland Records is an American record label founded by singer, songwriter and record producer R. Kelly in 1997. It was launched as an imprint of Interscope Records, a division of Universal Music Group. The label signed Chicago-based musical acts including singer Sparkle, hip hop duo Boo & Gotti, and rapper Strings, among others.

The label released just three albums before folding in 2002, following controversy surrounding Kelly's alleged pedophilia, including a sex tape scandal. As of 2025, with Kelly incarcerated in federal prison for multiple sex crimes, Rockland remains defunct with its rights under the control of Interscope Geffen A&M Records.

== History ==
Following the success of his chart-topping single, "I Believe I Can Fly", singer-songwriter R. Kelly founded Rockland Records in 1997, in a distribution deal with Interscope Records, a part of Universal Music Group. The deal was in agreement with Interscope co-founder Jimmy Iovine.

Its artists included singer Sparkle, rap duos Boo & Gotti, Vegas Cats, and R&B boy band Talent, among others. Sparkle was the first and only artist to release an album on the label; her self-titled debut was released in the summer of 1998. Despite various conflicts between Sparkle and the label, her debut album was certified platinum by the Recording Industry Association of America (RIAA) in December 2000. Its single, "Be Careful", became a novelty hit for the album and Sparkle's career. The soundtrack to the 1999 film, Life, was also released under the label. It featured tracks from K-Ci & JoJo, Maxwell, Mýa, and Destiny's Child, as well as Rockland's artists, Sparkle, Talent, and Vegas Cats.

The label's roster soon included Lady, Frankie, Secret Weapon and Rebecca F. Around this time, Sparkle was dropped from the label for refusing to show up to work unless her boyfriend, Steve Huff, was allowed to work on her next project. In addition, she was released several times for insubordination.

Talent released a single titled "Celebrity" from their intended debut album, Bulls Eye. The single, however, performed poorly, peaking at number 90 on the Bubbling Under Hot R&B/Hip-Hop Songs chart.

In 2002, following controversy surrounding founder R. Kelly's pedophilia and with leaking of the infamous sex tape featuring him and a fourteen-year-old female, Interscope effectively folded the label, ending their association with Kelly and its remaining artists. Rockland's planned albums and singles were also cancelled consequentially without notice. The label was revived once in 2004 to release Kelly and Jay-Z's collaborative album, Unfinished Business.

== Artists prior to 2002 disestablishment ==
Act	Years on the label	Releases under the label
R. Kelly	1997–2002	1
Strings	1997–1998	—
Sparkle	1998–1999	1
Boo & Gotti	1998–2002	—
Talent	1998–2002	—
Vegas Cats	1998–2002	—
Lady	1998–2002	—
Frankie	1998–2001	—
Secret Weapon	1998–2002	—

== Discography ==
Artist	Album	Details
Sparkle	Sparkle	Released: May 19, 1998; Chart position: #3 U.S.; RIAA certification: Platinum
Various artists	Life: Music Inspired by the Motion Picture	Released: March 16, 1999; Chart position: #10 U.S.; RIAA certification: Platinum
R. Kelly	Unfinished Business (with Jay-Z; released with Roc-A-Fella Records and Def Jam Recordings)	Released: October 26, 2004; Chart position: #1 U.S.; RIAA certification: Platinum

== See also ==
- List of record labels
