= Big Money Heavyweight =

Studio album by Big Tymers
- Released: December 9, 2003
- Recorded: 2003
- Genre: Southern hip-hop
- Labels: Cash Money; Universal
- Producers: Mannie Fresh; Bryan "Baby" Williams (exec.); Ronald "Slim" Williams (exec.); R. Kelly; Jazze Pha; Leslie Brathwaite

Big Tymers chronology
Hood Rich (2002)	Big Money Heavyweight (2003)

Professional ratings
Review scores
Source	Rating
AllMusic	3/5 stars
PopMatters	(unfavorable)
RapReviews	(7.5/10)
The Rolling Stone Album Guide	2.5/5 stars
USA Today	3/4 stars

Big Money Heavyweight is the fifth studio album by hip-hop duo Big Tymers. It was released on December 9, 2003, through Cash Money Records and was mainly produced by Mannie Fresh, with other production handled by R. Kelly, Jazze Pha and Leslie Brathwaite. The album debuted at number 21 on the Billboard 200 with first-week sales of 116,000 copies in the US and was certified Gold by the RIAA.

== Track listing ==
All tracks produced by Mannie Fresh, except where noted.

No.	Title	Writer(s)	Producer(s)	Length
1.	"Big Talk (Intro)"	Byron Thomas; Bryan Williams		2:03
2.	"This Is How We Do"	Thomas; Williams		4:31
3.	"Gangsta Girl" (featuring R. Kelly)	Williams; Robert Kelly	R. Kelly	4:18
4.	"We Can Smoke" (featuring TQ)	Williams; Thomas; Terrance Quaites		4:48
5.	"I'm a Dog/I'm Sorry (skit)"	Williams; Thomas; Phalon Alexander	Mannie Fresh; Jazze Pha (co.)	4:35
6.	"Against the Wall"	Williams; Thomas		4:10
7.	"I'll Take You There" (featuring Petey Pablo & Joi)	Williams; Thomas; Joi Gilliam; Moses Barrett; Angelo Bond; Greg Perry		4:23
8.	"Back Up" (featuring Juvenile & Gilly)	Williams; Thomas; Terius Gray		3:31
9.	"Southern Boy" (featuring Lil Wayne & Bun B)	Williams; Thomas; Dwayne Carter; Benard Freeman		4:06
10.	"Beat It Up" (featuring Tateeze)	Williams; Thomas; Marinna Teal		4:18
11.	"Big Money Heavyweight"	Williams; Thomas		3:11
12.	"Down South" (featuring Ludacris, Lil Wayne & Jazze Pha)	Williams; Thomas; Carter; Alexander; André Benjamin; Patrick Brown; Antwan Patton; Ray Murray; Rico Wade		4:11
13.	"U Are Not a Pimp" (featuring Gilly & Tateeze)	Williams; Thomas; Teal; Sar'd Nasir		3:33
14.	"I Need Help (skit)"	Thomas		1:55
15.	"To Be Played"	Williams; Thomas; O'Shea Jackson; Randy Muller		3:33
16.	"My Life" (featuring Mikkey & Joi)	Williams; Thomas; Leslie Brathwaite; Gilliam; Mikkel Nance	Mannie Fresh; Leslie Brathwaite	4:13
17.	"No Love"	Williams; Thomas		4:00
18.	"Got Everything" (featuring Tateeze)	Williams; Thomas; Varick Smith; Ron Dunbar; Edith Wayne		4:29
19.	"Dirty D-Boy" (featuring Gillie Da Kid)	Williams; Thomas		2:59
20.	"Real Talk (Outro)"			1:55

Sample credits

- "I'll Take You There" contains replayed elements from "If I Can't Fly", written by Angelo Bond and Greg Perry.
- "Down South" contains replayed elements from "Player's Ball (Reprise)", written by André Benjamin, Patrick Brown, Antwan Patton, Ray Murray, and Rico Wade.
- "To Be Played" contains replayed elements from "I Ain't Tha 1", written by O'Shea Jackson and Randy Muller.
- "Got Everything" contains replayed elements from "Girls It Ain't Easy", written by Ron Dunbar and Edith Wayne.

== Charts ==
=== Weekly charts ===
Chart (2003)	Peak position
US Billboard 200	21
US Top R&B/Hip-Hop Albums (Billboard)	6

=== Year-end charts ===
Chart (2004)	Position
US Billboard 200	165
US Top R&B/Hip-Hop Albums (Billboard)	45

== Certifications ==
Region	Certification	Certified units/sales
United States (RIAA)	Gold	500,000^{^}
^{^} Shipments figures based on certification alone.
