= Changing Faces (group) =

American contemporary R&B group

- Origin: Manhattan, New York, United States
- Genre: R&B
- Years active: 1994–2000; 2013
- Labels: Big Beat/Atlantic Records, CRC Records
- Members: Charisse Rose; Reefy Scott
- Past members: Cassandra Lucas

Changing Faces is an American female R&B duo that was initially active between the years 1994 until their hiatus in 2000.

In August 2009, a new Changing Faces song was leaked online called "Crazy Luv". The song was rumored to be on their new album, but was not confirmed by Lucas or Rose to be their comeback single off their new album, which was rumored to be released sometime in 2012.

On September 18, 2011, during a special appearance at the RnB Spotlight Concert with Lil Mo' at BB King's Blues Club in NYC, Changing Faces member Lucas announced on Kempire Radio and on YouKnowIGotSoul.com that she and Rose were in the recording studio working on a new Changing Faces project that would be released in 2012, with a new single being released soon. She also stated that the group never broke up and was working with R. Kelly on new music.

On April 3, 2013, Changing Faces released a new single "Hate Love" via iTunes. A music video was filmed but was not released.

In 2014, Changing Faces was scheduled to perform at an Rhythm & Blues Superstars concert in the United Kingdom - however, Rose brought along Reefy Scott who is also the new member of the group to tour and perform without telling Lucas. As a result, Lucas filed a lawsuit towards Rose - despite the duo mutually agreeing to halt any plans for a reunion.

== Other ventures ==
In September 2013, it was announced that Cassandra Lucas was working on a solo album in addition to forming a new label CRC Musik with her husband Noel “Chris” Absolam and business partner Richard Smith. Her debut solo single, "Damn" was released on September 3, 2013. She released subsequent singles "Music & a Beat" in July 2017 as well as "Give Love a Chance" and "I Love You" later that year.

Lucas’ first single "Name on It" premiered in January 2018 and became a hit on the Urban AC chart. Her second single "Take Me Home (Remix)" featuring Ron Browz and HoodCelebrityy will receive major promotion with the music video scheduled to film throughout the historical African American Day Parade in Lucas's Hometown of Harlem.

In April 2019, Cassandra Lucas released her debut solo album Long Way Home... The Intro.

Charisse Rose performed at a 1990s World Pride Concert in June 2019 with Reefy Scott as the new member.

== Discography ==
=== Studio albums ===
Title	Album details	Peak positions			Certifications
Title	Album details	US	US R&B	CAN	Certifications
Changing Faces	Released: August 23, 1994; Label: Big Beat / Atlantic; Formats: CD, cassette	25	1	—	RIAA: Platinum
All Day, All Night	Released: June 10, 1997; Label: Big Beat / Atlantic; Formats: CD, cassette	21	6	86	RIAA: Gold
Visit Me	Released: October 10, 2000; Label: Atlantic; Formats: CD, cassette	46	9	—	
"—" denotes a recording that did not chart or was not released in that territory.

=== Singles ===
Year	Title	Peak chart positions					Certifications	Album
Year	Title	US	US R&B	US Dan	NZ	UK	Certifications	Album
1994	"Stroke You Up"	3	2	—	15	43	RIAA: Platinum	Changing Faces
1994	"Foolin' Around"	38	9	—	—	—		Changing Faces
1995	"Keep It Right There"	—	49	—	—	—		Changing Faces
1995	"We Got It Goin' On"	—	61	—	—	—		White Man's Burden
1996	"I Got Somebody Else"	123	49	—	46	42		High School High
1997	"G.H.E.T.T.O.U.T."	8	1	—	22	10	RIAA: Platinum	All Day, All Night
1997	"All of My Days" (featuring Jay-Z)	65	38	—	—	—		All Day, All Night
1998	"Time After Time"	—	—	—	—	35		All Day, All Night
1998	"Same Tempo"	—	—	—	—	53		The Players Club
2000	"That Other Woman"	64	16	5	—	82		Visit Me
2000	"Ladies Man"	—	67	—	—	—		Visit Me
2013	"Hate Love"	—	—	—	—	—		Hate Love – Single
"—" denotes a recording that did not chart or was not released in that territory.

==== Featured singles ====
Year	Title	Artist	Peak positions		Album
Year	Title	Artist	US	US R&B	Album
1995	"Freedom (Theme from Panther)"	Various Artists	45	18	Panther
