= The System discography =

- Studio albums: 7
- Soundtrack albums: 2
- Compilation albums: 2
- Singles: 15
- Music videos: 7

The discography of American R&B/synthpop group the System consists of seven studio albums, fifteen singles and two compilation albums.

Formed around the year 1982, the group originally consisted of David Frank and Mic Murphy. It was disbanded in 1989, soon after their fifth and final studio album Rhythm & Romance came out.

Their most successful singles were "Don't Disturb This Groove" in 1987 and "You Are in My System" in 1983. "Don't Disturb This Groove" peaked at number four on the Billboard Hot 100 and number one on the Hot R&B/Hip-Hop Songs chart. "You Are in My System" peaked at number sixty-four on the Billboard Hot 100 and number ten on the Hot R&B/Hip-Hop Songs chart.

Most of the material were written by band members Mic Murphy and David Frank. However, the soundtrack material was written by different people, most notably "Coming to America" was written by Nile Rodgers.

== Albums ==
=== Studio albums ===
Title	Details	Peak chart positions	
Title	Details	US	US R&B
Sweat	Released: 1983; Label: Atlantic, Mirage; Format: CD, cassette, LP	94	14
X-Periment	Released: 1984; Label: Atlantic, Mirage; Format: cassette, LP	182	—
The Pleasure Seekers	Released: 1985; Label: Atlantic, Mirage; Format: cassette, LP	—	40
Don't Disturb This Groove	Released: 1987; Label: Atlantic; Format: CD, cassette, LP	62	13
Rhythm & Romance	Released: 1989; Label: Atlantic; Format: CD, cassette, LP	—	85
ESP	Released: 2000; Label: Atlantic, Mirage; Format: CD	—	—
System Overload	Released: 2013; Label: Atlantic, Mirage; Format: CD	—	—
"—" denotes releases that did not chart or was not released in that territory.

=== Compilation albums ===
Title	Details
X-Periment/The Pleasure Seekers	Released: January 18, 2005; Label: Wounded Bird; Format: CD
Unreleased Unleashed	Released: 2009; Label: Atlantic, Mirage; Format: CD

== Singles ==
Year	Title	Peak chart positions				Album
Year	Title	US	US Club	US R&B	UK	Album
1982	"It's Passion"	—	23	—	—	Sweat
1983	"You Are in My System"	64	14	10	89	Sweat
1983	"Sweat"	—	59	55	—	Sweat
1984	"Promises Can Break"	—	—	—	—	X-Periment
1984	"I Wanna Make You Feel Good"	—	—	48	73	X-Periment
1985	"This Is for You"	—	43	8	78	The Pleasure Seekers
1985	"The Pleasure Seekers"	—	22	21	—	The Pleasure Seekers
1985	"I Don't Run from Danger"	—	—	—	—	The Pleasure Seekers
1987	"Don't Disturb This Groove"	4	—	1	103	Don't Disturb This Groove
1987	"House of Rhythm / Groove"	—	—	—	—	Don't Disturb This Groove
1987	"Nighttime Lover"	—	—	7	—	Don't Disturb This Groove
1988	"Coming to America"	91	—	23	—	Coming to America soundtrack
1989	"Midnight Special"	—	—	5	—	Rhythm & Romance
1989	"I Wanna Be Your Lover"	—	—	—	—	Rhythm & Romance
1989	"Have Mercy"	—	—	—	—	Rhythm & Romance
"—" denotes a recording that did not chart or was not released in that territory.

== Music videos ==
Year	Title
1983	"You Are in My System"
1985	"The Pleasure Seekers"
1985	"This Is for You"
1987	"Don't Disturb This Groove"
1987	"House of Rhythm"
1988	"Coming to America"
1989	"Midnight Special"

== Other appearances ==
Year	Single	Peak chart positions		Notes
Year	Single	US	US R&B	Notes
1984	"Baptize the Beat"	—	—	Appearing on the movie about breakdancing and early hip hop culture, Beat Street.
1984	"Rock & Roll Me Again"	—	—	Appearing on the movie Beverly Hills Cop, starring Eddie Murphy.
1988	"Coming to America"	91	23	Appearing on the movie Coming to America, starring Eddie Murphy and James Earl Jones.
"—" denotes a recording that did not chart or was not released in that territory.
