= This Is for You =

- UK single sleeve

Single by The System

from the album The Pleasure Seekers
- Released: 1985
- Recorded: October 1984
- Genre: Electro
- Length: 6:00 (Radio version)
- Label: Mirage 0-96851 (US); Polydor POSPX-768 (UK)
- Songwriter(s): Mic Murphy, David Frank

The System singles chronology
"I Wanna Make You Feel Good" (1984)	"This Is for You" (1985)	"The Pleasure Seekers" (1985)

"This Is for You" is an electro-boogie song recorded by American "emotio-electro" band The System. The song, written by Mic Murphy and David Frank, was released in 1985 by Mirage Records. The song is also included in their 1985 album The Pleasure Seekers. The song was mixed by Tom Lord-Alge.

"This Is for You" reached #43 on the Club Play Singles and #8 on the Black Singles charts. In the United Kingdom, the song reached #78 on UK Singles Chart.

== Track listing ==
=== 1985 releases ===
12" vinyl

- US: Mirage / 0-96851

Side A
No.	Title	Length
1.	""This Is For You" (Vocal/Long Version)"	6:02

Side B
No.	Title	Length
1.	""This Is For You" (Radio version)"	6:00

12" vinyl

- UK: Polydor / POSPX 768

Side A
No.	Title	Length
1.	""This Is For You" (Extended Version)"	6:02

Side B
No.	Title	Length
1.	"Love Won't Wait For Lovin'"	4:47

== Personnel ==
- Producer: Mic Murphy, David Frank
- Songwriter: Mic Murphy, David Frank
- Produced by Mic Murphy and David Frank for Science Lab Productions.
- Mixing: Tom Lord-Alge

== Chart performance ==
Chart (1985)	Peak position
UK Singles Chart	#78
U.S. Billboard R&B Singles	#8
U.S. Billboard Hot Dance Music/Club Play	#43
