= E-mu Emulator =

Series of digital sampling synthesizers

E-mu Emulator series
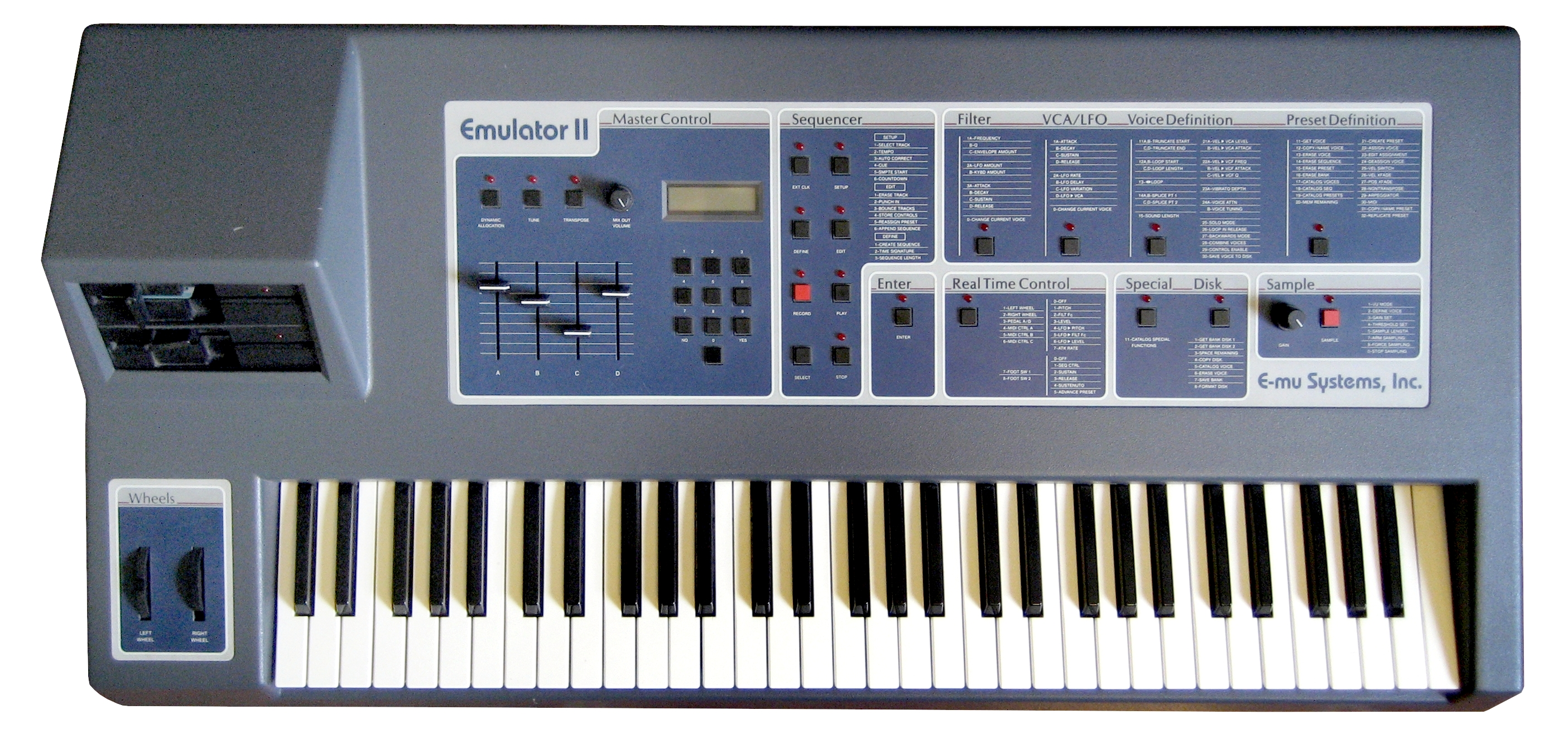
- E-mu Emulator II (1984)
- Manufacturer: E-mu Systems
- Price: $7,995 (Emulator II in 1984) equivalent to $24,776 in 2025

Technical specifications
- Polyphony: 8 voices (Emulator II)
- Timbrality: Monotimbral Emulator, 8-part Multitimbral (Emulator II)
- Oscillator: 8-bit 27 kHz sample (Emulator II)
- LFO: Sine wave
- Synthesis type: Sample-based synthesis
- Filter: 24 dB/octave resonant analog low pass (Emulator II)
- Aftertouch expression: Yes (Emulator II)
- Velocity expression: Yes (Emulator II)
- Storage memory: 512 kB to 1 MB (Emulator II)

Input/output
- Keyboard: 61 keys
- Left-hand control: Pitch bend, mod wheel
- External control: MIDI (Emulator II)

The Emulator is a series of digital sampling synthesizers using floppy-disk storage that was manufactured by E-mu Systems from 1981 until 2002. Although it was not the first commercial sampler, the Emulator was innovative in its integration of computer technology and was among the first samplers to find widespread usage among musicians. While costly, its price was considerably lower than those of its early competitors, and its smaller size increased its portability and, resultantly, practicality for live performance. The line was discontinued in 2002.

== Impetus ==
E-mu Systems was founded in 1971 as a manufacturer of microprocessor chips, digital scanning keyboards and components for electronic instruments. Licensing revenue for this technology afforded E-mu the ability to invest in research and development, and it began to develop boutique synthesizers for niche markets, including a series of modular synthesizers and the high-end Audity system, of which only one prototype was produced. In 1979, founders Scott Wedge and Dave Rossum saw the Fairlight CMI and the Linn LM-1 at a convention, inspiring them to design and produce a less expensive digital sampling keyboard.

E-mu originally considered selling the design for the Emulator to Sequential Circuits, which was using E-mu's keyboard design in its Prophet-5 synthesizer. However, Sequential Circuits ceased paying E-mu royalties for its keyboard design, which prompted E-mu to release the Emulator commercially.

== Products ==
=== Emulator ===
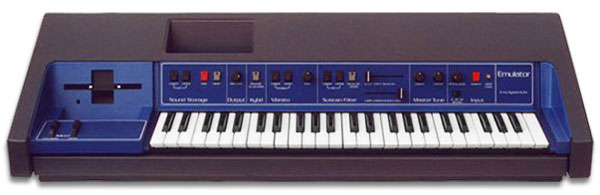
E-mu Emulator (1981)

Finally released in 1981, the Emulator was a floppy disk-based keyboard workstation that musicians could use to sample sounds, record them to storage media, and play them back as musical notes on the keyboard. With the 5 1/4" floppy disk drive, the owner could build a library of samples and share them with others or purchase prerecorded libraries on disk.

The original Emulator was a very basic eight-bit sampler with only a simple filter, and it could do only a single loop. The initial model did not include a VCA envelope generator. It was produced in three forms: a two-voice model (only one of which was ever sold), a four-voice model and an eight-voice model. The keyboard was designed to be played in split mode with one sample on each side, so playing the same sound on the full keyboard required loading the same sound from disk into each side.

Stevie Wonder, who gave the sampler a glowing review at the 1981 NAMM International Music & Sound Expo, received the first unit (serial number 0001). The first unit had originally been promised to Daryl Dragon of Captain & Tennille, as he was a longtime E-mu modular-system owner, but Wonder's greater fame moved him to the top of the list. In 1982, the Emulator was updated to include a VCA envelope generator and a simple sequencer, and its price was lowered. Approximately 500 units were sold before the unit was discontinued in early 1984. Other users of the original E-mu Emulator were New Order, Tangerine Dream and Tony Banks of Genesis, and it was among the instruments used in the production of Michael Jackson's Thriller album. Composer and writer David Frank of the System used the original Emulator on his productions from Sweat to Don't Disturb this Groove. The Residents, who had received the fifth Emulator produced, used the instrument extensively on their album The Tunes of Two Cities. Vangelis had an Emulator at Nemo Studios in London and used it on the Blade Runner soundtrack.

=== Emulator II ===
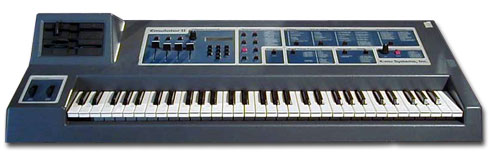
E-mu Emulator II (1984)

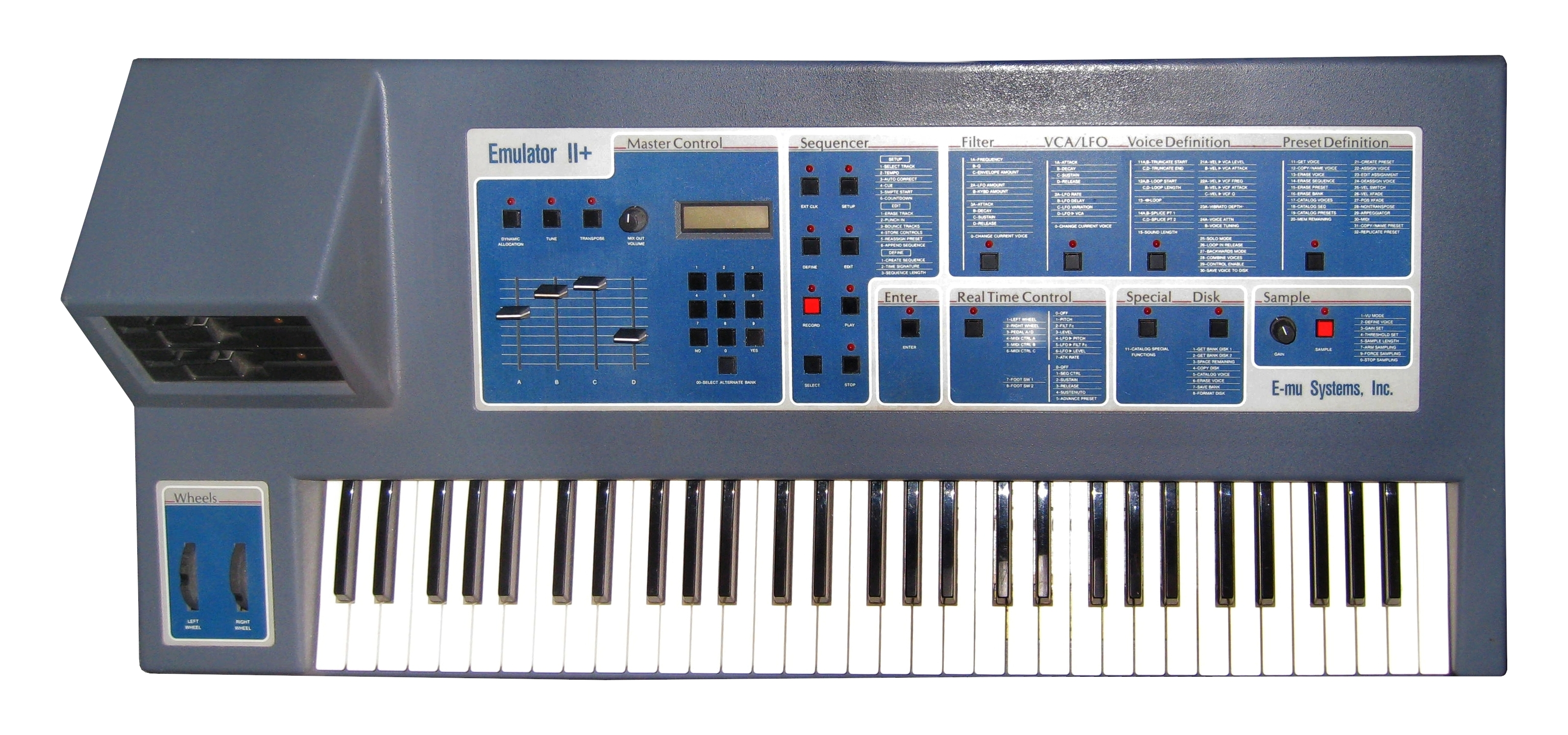
E-mu Emulator II+

Released commercially in 1984, the Emulator II (or EII) was E-mu's second sampler. Like the original Emulator, it was an eight-bit sampler, but it delivered superior fidelity by employing companding digital-to-analog converters and a 27.7 kHz sample rate. It also allowed more flexibility in editing and shaping sounds, as resonant analog filters (provided by longtime E-Mu collaborators SSM) were added. The EII also featured greatly improved real-time control. Its price was similar to that of the original Emulator, at US$7,995 for a regular model and $9,995 for a "plus" model featuring extra sample memory. Several upgrades, including a second floppy drive, a 20 MB hard drive, and a 512K memory upgrade were also available. Despite the EII's price, it was considered good value in comparison to the Fairlight CMI Series II, the most basic model of which was priced at $30,000 upon its initial release.

The Emulator II offers a unique sound because of its DPCM mu-255 companding, divider-based variable sample-rate principle and analog output stages featuring SSM2045 24 dB/oct analog four-pole low-pass resonant filters.

Several OEM and third-party sample libraries were developed for the Emulator II, including orchestral sounds. Many of the EII's original library sounds were sampled from the more expensive Fairlight and Synclavier workstations (for example, the Fairlight's "Sarrar/Arr1" choir sample is called "DigiVcs" in the E-mu library). Samples include the Shakuhachi flute used by Peter Gabriel on "Sledgehammer" and by Enigma on their album MCMXC a.D., and the Marcato Strings heard on the Pet Shop Boys' "West End Girls". According to the Pet Shop Boys' Neil Tennant, every instrumental sound on the track was produced with an Emulator II.

Musicians who used The Emulator II in the 1980s includes early adopter Stevie Wonder, Front 242, Depeche Mode, 808 State, New Order, ABC, Genesis, Paul McCartney, David Bowie, Herbie Hancock, Vangelis, Tangerine Dream, Jean-Michel Jarre, Yes, OMD, Brent Mydland, Stevie Nicks, Russ Freeman, Mr. Mister and Margita Stefanović.

It was also used on the Terminator film score by Brad Fiedel, many of Michael Kamen's film scores (such as Lethal Weapon and Highlander) and nearly all of John Carpenter's films in the 1980s. The Emulator II is featured in the film Ferris Bueller's Day Off when the titular character plays samples of coughing and sneezing in order to feign illness over a phone. David Foster mentioned his Emulator II in the 1985 documentary about the creation of Tears Are Not Enough, a song in which a note of a French horn was included in the single.

=== Emulator III ===
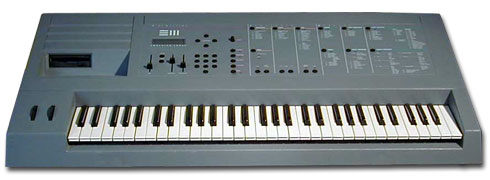
E-mu Emulator III (1987–1991)

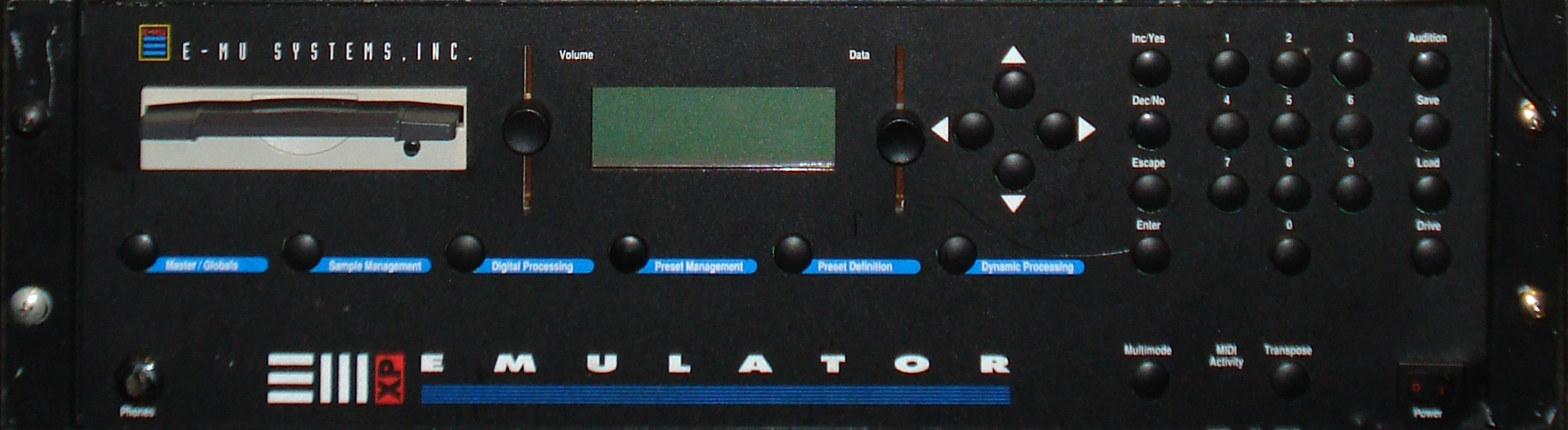
E-mu Emulator IIIXP (1993)

The Emulator III was introduced after the discontinuation of the Emulator II in 1987, and was manufactured until 1991. A rack-mountable version was introduced in 1988.

It featured four or eight megabytes of memory, depending on the model, and it could store samples in 16-bit, 44 kHz stereo, which was equivalent to that of the most advanced, professional equipment available. The Emulator III's sound quality was also improved greatly over that of its predecessors, with quieter outputs and more reliable filter chips produced by CEM. However, the Emulator III was considerably less popular than its predecessors, largely because of its price; at a time when manufacturers such as Akai, Ensoniq and Casio offered samplers at less than $2,000, the Emulator III's use of high-quality components resulted in a price as high as $12,695 for the 4 MB model and $15,195 for the 8 MB model. E-mu had previously been able to sell its samplers in the $10,000 range because the only alternatives were the $30,000–$200,000 Fairlight CMI and the $75,000–$500,000 NED Synclavier system. However, as technology had advanced and become increasingly accessible, E-mu faced great difficulty remaining competitive.

Although the Emulator III did not prove a great success, it may be heard in the music of Tony Banks of Genesis, Lynda Thomas, 808 State and Depeche Mode; the latter used it on their 1990 album Violator.

=== Emulator IV and EOS ===
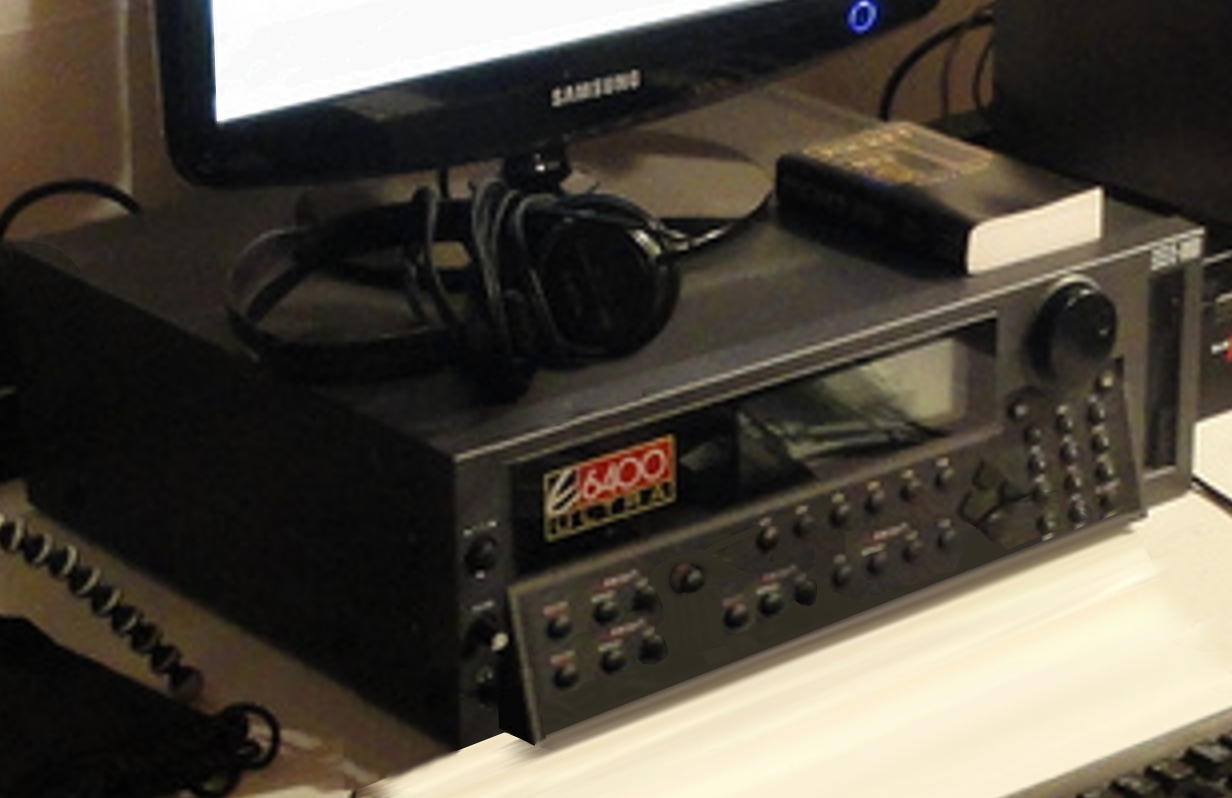
E-mu e6400 Ultra (1999)

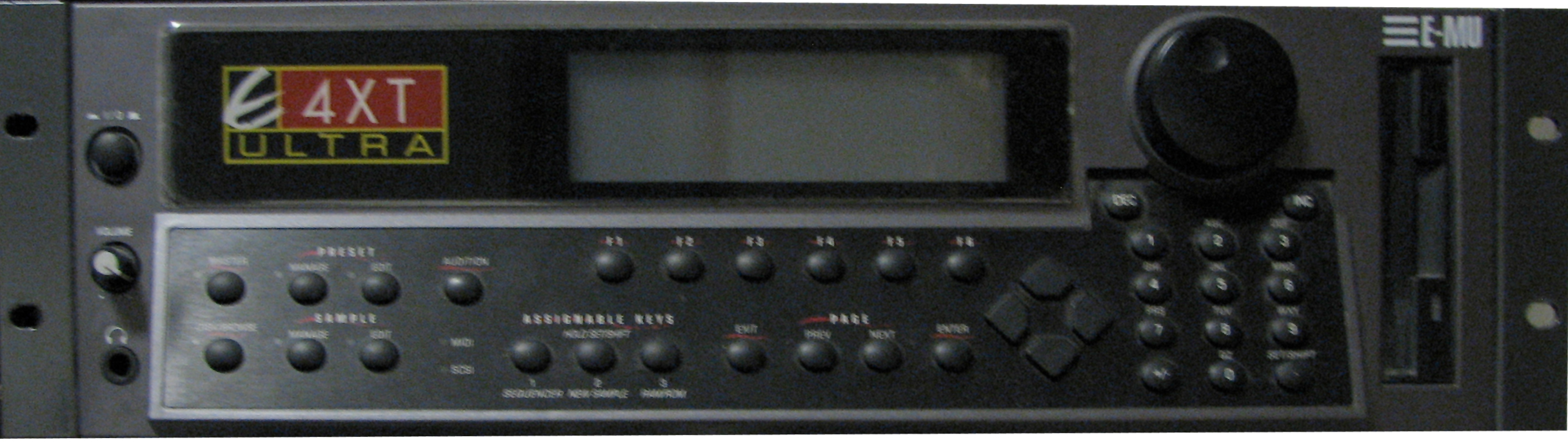
E-mu E4XT Ultra (1999)

The Emulator IV (EIV or E4) series of samplers was introduced in 1994. The new, proprietary operating system used in the EIV was known as the Emulator Operating System or EOS. The flash memory in these models was expandable.

The Emulator IV was the first to be released, a rack sampler that featured 128 voices and memory expansion up to 128 MB. Options included a multi-effects processor, additional output sockets, and 32 MIDI channels.

The e64 was launched in 1995 and, in order to meet a lower price point, was limited to only 64 voices and a maximum 64 MB of memory. It was joined in 1996 by the E4K, essentially an E64 with a 76-key weighted keyboard; however, it could be expanded to 128 voices and 128 MB of memory and included the effects processor and other previous options as standard.

A second series of rackmount EIV was launched in 1997 with the E4X Turbo as the new 128-voice flagship model. The E4X (without Turbo) and e6400 offered only 64 voices and fewer options in order to meet lower price points, although unlike the e64, it was fully upgradable. E-mu also released the E-Synth in both rack and keyboard form, with both models including a 16 MB sound ROM and an optional 16 MB "Dance" factory-installed sound ROM that would be accessible immediately upon startup of the unit. The E-Synth Keyboard was the final Emulator keyboard model to be produced.

In 1999, the final EIV samplers were marketed with the Ultra designation. The Ultras featured a fast processor and upgraded analog output stages, as well as the ability to install the RFX dedicated high-quality effects processor and ultimately run the very final version of EOS. The entry-level model was the E5000 Ultra, which was limited to four output jacks, could not accept the voice upgrade, and was unable to write sound ROMs. The E6400 Ultra (now with a capital "E") was a basic model but with full upgradability, the E-Synth Ultra (rack only) refined the previous E-Synth models (since referred to as "Classic"s) with one or two new 16 MB sound ROMs, and the E4XT Ultra was the top model with the full 128 voices, digital audio inputs and outputs, 32 MIDI channels, and an ASCII keyboard input for remote control. The final Ultra sampler, called the E4 Platinum, was loaded with the RFX effects card and every option.

The EIV series was discontinued in 2002.

== Notable players ==
The following musicians have played an E-mu Emulator series sampler in their recordings:

- ABC
- David Bowie
- Daft Punk
- Depeche Mode used Emulator I, II and III in studio recordings and in live performances
- Enya
- Front 242
- Tony Banks of Genesis used Emulator I, II and III models
- Philip Glass
- Herbie Hancock
- Jean-Michel Jarre
- Kitaro
- Paul McCartney
- Mr. Mister
- Brent Mydland with Grateful Dead
- New Order
- Orchestral Manoeuvres in the Dark
- Pet Shop Boys used an Emulator II
- The Residents used an Emulator II
- Tangerine Dream
- Simple Minds used an Emulator II
- Vangelis
- Brian Wilson
- Stevie Wonder purchased the first production Emulator I
- Yes
- Margita Stefanović used an Emulator II
- Yellow Magic Orchestra
- Michael Boddicker
- Bill Bottrell
- Brad Buxer used an Emulator III

== See also ==
- E-mu Emax
- E-mu Drumulator
- Sampler (musical instrument)
