= It's Passion =

Single by The System

from the album Sweat
- Released: 1982
- Recorded: 1981
- Genre: Electro
- Length: 3:45 (short version)
- Label: Mirage DMD-346 (US
- Songwriter(s): Mic Murphy, David Frank

The System singles chronology
"It's Passion" (1982)	"You Are in My System" (1983)

"It's Passion" is the debut single recorded by American electro-soul band the System. The song, written by Mic Murphy, David Frank, was released in 1982 by Mirage Records. The song is also included on their 1983 album Sweat. It was a club hit that reached number 23 on the Billboard Club/Dance chart.

== Track listing ==
12" vinyl

- US: Mirage / DMD-384

Side A
No.	Title	Length
1.	""It's Passion" (long version)"	7:30

Side B
No.	Title	Length
1.	""It's Passion" (short version)"	3:45

== Personnel ==
- Producer: Mic Murphy, David Frank
- Songwriter: Mic Murphy, David Frank
- Produced by Mic Murphy and David Frank for Science Lab Productions.

== Chart performance ==
Chart (1982)	Peak position
U.S. Billboard Hot Dance Music/Club Play	23
