= Ventriloquism (album) =

Studio album by Meshell Ndegeocello
- Released: March 16, 2018
- Genre: R&B; pop
- Length: 53:34
- Label: Naïve

Meshell Ndegeocello chronology
Comet, Come to Me (2014)	Ventriloquism (2018)	The Omnichord Real Book

Professional ratings
Aggregate scores
Source	Rating
AnyDecentMusic?	7.6/10
Metacritic	80/100
Review scores
Source	Rating
AllMusic	4/5 stars
Exclaim!	7/10
Financial Times	4/5 stars
The Guardian	3/5 stars
The Independent	4/5 stars
Mojo	4/5 stars
Pitchfork	7.8/10
PopMatters	8/10
Slant Magazine	4/5 stars
The Times	4/5 stars

Ventriloquism is the 12th studio album from Meshell Ndegeocello, released on March 16, 2018. The album covers eleven R&B and pop tracks originally recorded in the 1980s and 1990s. It was nominated for Best Urban Contemporary Album at the 2019 Grammy Awards.

A portion of the profits of the album will go to the ACLU.

== Track listing ==
No.	Title	Writer(s)	Original artist(s)	Length
1.	"I Wonder If I Take You Home"	Curt Bedeau; Gerry Charles; Hugh L. Clarke; Brian George; Lucien George; Paul George	Lisa Lisa and Cult Jam featuring Full Force	4:44
2.	"Nite and Day"	Albert Brown; Kyle West	Al B. Sure!	5:00
3.	"Sometimes It Snows in April"	Prince; Wendy & Lisa	Prince	7:05
4.	"Waterfalls"	Marqueze Etheridge; Lisa Lopes; Organized Noize	TLC	4:34
5.	"Atomic Dog 2017"	George Clinton; Garry Shider; David Spradley	George Clinton	6:27
6.	"Sensitivity"	James Harris III; Terry Lewis	Ralph Tresvant	3:43
7.	"Funny How Time Flies (When You're Having Fun)"	Harris; Lewis; Janet Jackson	Janet Jackson	4:33
8.	"Tender Love"	Harris; Lewis	Force MDs	2:41
9.	"Don't Disturb This Groove"	David Frank; Mic Murphy	The System	4:38
10.	"Private Dancer"	Mark Knopfler	Tina Turner	4:51
11.	"Smooth Operator"	Sade Adu; Ray St. John	Sade	5:18
Total length:				53:34

== Charts ==
Chart (2018)	Peak position
Belgian Albums (Ultratop Flanders)	86
Swiss Albums (Schweizer Hitparade)	62
UK Independent Albums (OCC)	46
