= I Wanna Make You Feel Good =

Single by The System

from the album X-Periment
- Released: 1984
- Recorded: October 1983
- Genre: Dance-pop; boogie; electro
- Length: 4:20 (Album Version)
- Label: Mirage (US); Polydor (UK)
- Songwriter(s): David Frank, Mic Murphy, Paul Pesco

"I Wanna Make You Feel Good" is a dance-pop song released in 1984 by The System. The song appears on the album X-Periment. B-side of the single is "Promises Can Break", another song from the album. The single version was a moderate hit in the United Kingdom, reaching number 73 on UK Singles Chart. It was also a minor radio hit.

== 1984 release ==
12" vinyl

- UK: Polydor / POSPX-685

1. "I Wanna Make You Feel Good" (Extended US Remix) - 6:49
2. "Long Time Waiting On You" (Extended US Remix) - 6:02

== Personnel ==
- Songwriter, producer: David Frank
- Songwriter, producer: Mic Murphy
- Songwriter: Paul Pesco
