= You Are in My System =

1982 single by the System

Single by the System

from the album Sweat
- Released: August 26, 1982
- Recorded: 1982
- Studio: Sorcerer Sound Studios (New York City)
- Genre: Dance; electronic
- Length: 3:42 (single/video version); 5:57 (album version)
- Label: Mirage DMD-384 (US); Polydor POSPX-580 (UK)
- Songwriters: Mic Murphy; David Frank
- Producers: Mic Murphy; David Frank

The System singles chronology
"It's Passion" (1982)	"You Are in My System" (1982)	"I Won't Let Go" (1983)

Music video
- "You Are in My System" on YouTube

"You Are in My System" is a 1982 song recorded by American band the System. The song, written by Mic Murphy and David Frank, was released in August 1982 by Mirage Records. The song is also included on their debut studio album Sweat (1983). The song is one of the duo’s most recognizable songs, and a favorite of many System fans worldwide.

== Reception ==
"You Are in My System" reached No. 64 on the Billboard Hot 100, while it topped both the Black Singles and Club Play charts. A Spanish version of the song called "Tu Estas En Mi Systema" was released by the System in late-1982.

== Robert Palmer version ==
"You Are in My System"

Single by Robert Palmer

from the album Pride
- Released: March 1983 (UK)
- Recorded: 1983
- Genre: R&B; electropop
- Length: 2:57 (single version); 4:23 (album version); 6:08 (12" single version)
- Label: Island IS-104 (UK)
- Songwriters: Mic Murphy; David Frank
- Producer: Robert Palmer

Robert Palmer singles chronology
"Pride" (1982)	"You Are in My System" (1983)	"You Can Have It (Take My Heart)" (1983)

Music video
- "You Are in My System" on YouTube

In 1983, the song was covered by the British rock singer Robert Palmer. This version, which was produced by Palmer and remixed by Dominique Blanc-Francard, reached No. 78 on the Billboard Hot 100 chart and also reached No. 33 on the Mainstream Rock chart. It was actually recorded after the rest of the Pride album had been completed when Palmer heard the original 12" promo copy at famous Paris private night club l'Elysées Matignon played by top DJ Bernie Bernthaler. He quickly flew back to cut it as an extra track, and it was recorded within 24 hours. He had even persuaded David Frank to play on it himself. This was the album's only successful single. Lyrics were changed in part from "It's a romantic vision, Of me and you, Holding hands on Sunday, And Monday too" to "It's a romantic vision of me and you, It happens all the time, My dreams are filled with you".

== Track listings ==
=== The System ===
12" vinyl

- US: Mirage / DMD-384
- 1982 release

Side A
No.	Title	Length
1.	"You Are in My System (vocal)"	7:43

Side B
No.	Title	Length
1.	"You Are in My System (vocal)"	7:43

12" vinyl

- UK: Polydor / POSPX 580

Side A
No.	Title	Length
1.	"You Are in My System"	7:44

Side B
No.	Title	Length
1.	"Now I Am Electric"	4:06

=== Robert Palmer ===
12" vinyl

- UK: Island / IS-104
- 1983 release

Side A
No.	Title	Length
1.	"You Are in My System"	6:08

Side B
No.	Title	Length
1.	"Deadline"	3:53

== Personnel ==
=== The System ===
- Producer: Mic Murphy, David Frank
- Songwriter: Mic Murphy, David Frank
- Produced by Mic Murphy and David Frank for Science Lab Productions.

=== Robert Palmer ===
- Executive Producer: David Harper
- Arrangement: Robert Palmer
- Producer: Robert Palmer
- Photography: Peter Ashworth
- Mixing: Dominique Blanc-Francard
- Music: RP Band

== Chart performance ==
=== The System version ===
Chart (1982/1983)	Peak position
UK Singles Chart	89
US Billboard Hot 100	64
US Billboard R&B Singles	10
US Billboard Hot Dance Music/Club Play	14

=== Robert Palmer version ===
Chart (1983)	Peak position
UK Singles Chart	53
US Billboard Hot 100	78
US Billboard Mainstream Rock Tracks	33
US Billboard Hot Dance Music/Club Play	4
