= The Pleasure Seekers =

The Pleasure Seekers may refer to:

- The Pleasure Seekers (1920 film), an American film directed by George Archainbaud
- The Pleasure Seekers (1964 film), an American film based on the novel Coins in the Fountain
- The Pleasure Seekers (band), a 1960s-era, all-female garage rock band from Detroit, Michigan
- The Pleasure Seekers (album), an album by American band The System
  - "The Pleasure Seekers" (song), a song from the album
