= Nighttime Lover =

Single by The System

from the album Don't Disturb This Groove
- Released: 1987
- Recorded: 1986
- Genre: R&B; pop; dance-pop
- Length: 5:23 (album version); 4:10 (Radio mix)
- Label: Atlantic DMD-1067
- Songwriter(s): David Frank, Mic Murphy
- Producer(s): The System

The System singles chronology
"Don't Disturb This Groove" (1987)	"Nighttime Lover" (1987)	"Coming to America" (1988)

"Nighttime Lover" is an R&B song by American duo The System, from the 1987 album Don't Disturb This Groove. The song was written by the group's members, David Frank and Mic Murphy.

In 1987, the smooth, urban-infused tune reached number seven on the Billboard R&B Singles chart.

== Track listing ==
=== 1987 release ===
12" vinyl

- US: Atlantic / DMD-1067

Side A
No.	Title	Version	Length
1.	"Nighttime Lover"	Vocal/Extended Remix	3:45

Side B
No.	Title	Version	Length
1.	"Nighttime Lover"	Edited	3:58
2.	"Nighttime Lover"	Radio Mix	4:10
3.	"Nighttime Lover"	Dub	4:30
4.	"Nighttime Lover"	A Cappella	3:06

== Personnel ==
- Mic Murphy: Lead and background vocals
- David Frank: keyboards
- Paul Pesco: guitar
- Jimmy Maelen: percussion
- Andy Snitzer: sax solo
- B.J. Nelson, Audrey Wheeler, Dolette McDonald: backing vocals
- New West Horns: horns

== Chart performance ==
Chart (1987)	Peak position
U.S. Billboard Hot Black Singles	7
