= Don't Disturb This Groove =

Don't Disturb This Groove may refer to:

- "Don't Disturb This Groove" (song), a 1987 song by The System
- Don't Disturb This Groove (album), a 1987 album by The System
