= The Pleasure Seekers (song) =

Single by The System

from the album The Pleasure Seekers
- Released: 1985
- Recorded: March 1985
- Genre: Dance-pop; new wave
- Length: 5:24 (Long version)
- Label: Mirage, Atlantic 0-96875 (US)
- Songwriter(s): Mic Murphy, David Frank
- Producer(s): Mic Murphy, David Frank

The System singles chronology
"This Is for You" (1985)	"The Pleasure Seekers" (1985)	"Don't Disturb This Groove" (1987)

"The Pleasure Seekers" is a song recorded by American band The System. The song, written by Mic Murphy, David Frank, was released in 1985 by Mirage Records. The song is also included in their 1985 album The Pleasure Seekers. The song was mixed by Tom Lord-Alge.

"The Pleasure Seekers" reached #22 on the Club Play Singles and #21 on the Black Singles charts.

== Track listing ==
=== 1985 release ===
12" vinyl

- US: Mirage / 0-96875

Side A
No.	Title	Length
1.	""The Pleasure Seekers" (Vocal/Long Version)"	5:24

Side B
No.	Title	Length
1.	""The Pleasure Seekers" (Dub Mix)"	5:45

== Personnel ==
- Producer: Mic Murphy, David Frank
- Songwriter: Mic Murphy, David Frank
- Produced by Mic Murphy and David Frank for Science Lab Productions.
- Mixing: Tom Lord-Alge

== Chart performance ==
Chart (1985)	Peak position
U.S. Billboard R&B Singles	#21
U.S. Billboard Hot Dance Music/Club Play	#22
