= Robert Greenberg (disambiguation) =

Robert Greenberg (born 1954) is an American composer, pianist, and musicologist.

Robert or Bob Greenberg may also refer to:

- Robert Greenberg (born 1940), Founder and CEO of Skechers
- Robert M. Greenberg of R/GA, see Academy Award for Best Visual Effects
- Bob Greenberg (1934–2009), American record executive
- Bob Greenberg (programmer), early Microsoft employee
- Bob Greenberg (writer), wrote Lobster Man from Mars
