= Jerry Greenberg =

Jerry Greenberg may refer to:

- Jerry L. Greenberg, music executive
- Gerald B. Greenberg (1936–2017), film editor, usually credited as Jerry Greenberg
