= Get Ready (Kleeer album) =

Studio album by Kleeer
- Released: 1982
- Recorded: 1982
- Studio: Atlantic Studios, New York City, New York
- Genre: Soul, funk
- Label: Atlantic
- Producer: Kleeer

Kleeer chronology
License to Dream (1981)	Get Ready (1982)	Taste the Music (1982)

Get Ready is the fourth album by American New York City based Kleeer.

Professional ratings
Review scores
Source	Rating
Allmusic	2/5 stars

== Track listing ==
1. "Get Ready" (Norman Durham) 5:55
2. "Pritty Things" (Richard Lee) 4:02
3. "Slidin' & Glidin'" (Woody Cunningham) 5:25
4. "Stonseee" (Norman Durham, Paul Crutchfield, Richard Lee, Woody Cunningham) 3:15
5. "She Said She Loves Me" (Woody Cunningham) 6:02
6. "Say You'll Stay" (Norman Durham, Woody Cunningham) 4:50
7. "Your Love Is What I Need" (Norman Durham) 5:46

== Personnel ==
- Norman Durham - percussion, synthesizer, lead and backing vocals
- Woody Cunningham - percussion, rap, lead vocals
- Paul Crutchfield - congas, percussion, synthesizer, backing vocals
- Richard Lee - guitar, backing vocals
- David Frank, Khris Kellow, Rick James, Khris Kellow - synthesizer
- Doc Powell - guitar
- Louis Smalls - acoustic piano
- John "Skip" Anderson - acoustic piano, synthesizer
- Danny Lamelle - saxophone
- Ethel Beatty, Luther Vandross, Debbie Cole, Lynn Gerber - backing vocals

== Charts ==
=== Singles ===
Year	Single	Chart positions
Year	Single	US R&B
1983	"She Said She Loves Me'"	84
