= Rhythm & Romance =

Rhythm & Romance may refer to:

- Rhythm & Romance (Rosanne Cash album), 1985
- Rhythm & Romance (Kenny G album), 2008
- Rhythm & Romance (The System album), 1989
