= Taste the Music =

Studio album by Kleeer
- Released: 1982
- Recorded: 1982
- Studio: Atlantic Studios, New York City, New York
- Genre: Soul, funk
- Label: Atlantic
- Producer: Dennis King; Kleeer

Kleeer chronology
Get Ready (1982)	Taste the Music (1982)	Intimate Connection (1984)

Professional ratings
Review scores
Source	Rating
Allmusic	2.5/5 stars

Taste The Music is the fifth album by New York City-based American band Kleeer.

== Track listing ==
1. "Taste the Music" (Woody Cunningham, Norman Durham) 7:23
2. "I've Had Enough (Can't Take It Anymore)" (Terry Dolphin, Woody Cunningham) 4:56
3. "De Ting Continues" ( Paul Crutchfield, Norman Durham, Eric Rohrbaugh, Richard Lee Jr.) 4:35
4. "Wall to Wall" (Richard Lee Jr.) 3:26
5. "I Shall Get Over" (Woody Cunningham, Norman Durham) 6:29
6. "Fella" (Woody Cunningham) 4:49
7. "Swann" (Paul Crutchfield) 4:40
8. "Affirmative Mood" (Norman Durham, Woody Cunningham, Paul Crutchfield, Eric Rohrbaugh, Richard Lee Jr.) 3:54

== Personnel ==
- Norman Durham - bass, electric piano, acoustic piano, synthesizer, Clavinet, cowbell, percussion, lead and backing vocals
- Woody Cunningham - drums, synthesizer, cowbell, temple block, timbales, raps, lead and backing vocals
- Paul Crutchfield - acoustic guitar, percussion, congas, backing vocals
- Eric Rohrbaugh - electric piano, synthesizer, backing vocals
- Richard Lee Jr. - guitar, acoustic guitar, triangle, percussion
- Terry Dolphin - acoustic piano, electric piano
- Robbie Kondor, Louis Smalls - synthesizer
- Michael Murphy - guitar, synthesizer programming
- Jon Faddis - trumpet
- Dennis King - intro vice announcement
- Melanie Moore - lead vocals and backing vocals
- Isabelle Coles, Luther Vandross, Meli'sa Morgan, Yvette Flowers - backing vocals

== Charts ==
Chart (1982)	Peak position
Billboard Pop Albums	139
Billboard Top Soul Albums	31

=== Singles ===
Year	Single	Chart positions	
Year	Single	US R&B	US Dance
1982	"De Ting Continues'"	74	-
1982	"Taste The Music"	55	31
