= I Love to Dance =

Studio album by Kleeer
- Released: 1979
- Recorded: 1979
- Studios: Power Station, New York City
- Genres: Soul, funk
- Label: Atlantic
- Producer: Dennis King

Kleeer chronology
I Love to Dance (1979)	Winners (1979)

Professional ratings
Review scores
Source	Rating
Allmusic	3/5 stars

I Love to Dance is the debut album by New York City based band Kleeer, released in 1979.

== Track listing ==
1. "Tonight's The Night (Good Time)" (Norman Durham) 6:20
2. "Keeep Your Body Workin'" (Norman Durham) 5:19
3. "Happy Me" (Norman Durham) 4:30
4. "I Love To Dance" (Norman Durham) 4:28
5. "It's Magic" (Richard Lee, Jr.) 7:19
6. "To Groove You" (Paul Crutchfield, Woody Cunningham) 3:14
7. "Amour" (Paul Crutchfield) 5:08
8. "Kleeer Sailin'" (Woody Cunningham) 5:47

== Personnel ==
- Norman Durham - bass, vocals, synthesizer, Syn drums, percussion, guitar, Clavinet, piano
- Woody Cunningham - drums, vocals, Syn drums, percussion
- Richard Cummings - Fender Rhodes electric piano, Clavinet
- Paul Crutchfield - percussion, vocals, wind chimes, congas
- Richard Lee - guitar, vocals, percussion
- Terry Dolphin - vibraphone, grand piano
- Angel Nater Jr. - percussion
- Gene Orloff - concertmaster
- Marvin Stamm, Randy Brecker - trumpet, flugelhorn
- Isabelle Coles - lead vocals, backing vocals
- Louise Fischer - foreign language vocals

== Charts ==
Chart (1979)	Peak position
Billboard Soul Albums	53

=== Singles ===
Year	Single	Chart positions	
Year	Single	US R&B	US Dance
1979	"Keeep Your Body Workin'"	60	54
1979	"Tonight's The Night (Good Time)"	33	-
