= Winners (Kleeer album) =

Studio album by Kleeer
- Released: 1979
- Recorded: 1979
- Studio: Power Station, New York City
- Genre: Soul, funk
- Length: 42:30
- Label: Atlantic
- Producer: Dennis King; Kleeer

Kleeer chronology
| I Love to Dance (1979) | Winners (1979) | License to Dream (1981) |

Professional ratings
Review scores
| Source | Rating |
|---|---|
| Allmusic | 3/5 stars |

Winners is the second album by American New York City based Kleeer.

== Track listing ==
1. "Winners" (Norman Durham, Woody Cunningham) 7:09
2. "I Still Love You" (Woody Cunningham) 4:12
3. "Your Way" (Norman Durham, Woody Cunningham) 4:44
4. "Close To You" (Richard Lee Jr.) 5:24
5. "Rollin' On" (Paul Crutchfield, Woody Cunningham) 3:49
6. "Nothin' Said" (Woody Cunningham) 4:54
7. "Hunger For Your Love" (Paul Crutchfield, Richard Lee Jr.) 5:34
8. "Open Your Mind" (Norman Durham, Woody Cunningham) 6:44

== Personnel ==
- Norman Durham - Clavinet, Fender Rhodes electric piano, guitar, harpsichord, Arp Omni Omnichord, percussion, lead and backing vocals
- Woody Cunningham - drums, percussion, lead and backing vocals
- Paul Crutchfield - congas, percussion, backing vocals
- Terry Dolphin - Clavinet, Fender Rhodes electric piano, grand piano
- Richard Lee - guitar, percussion, backing vocals
- Eric Rohrbaugh - Clavinet, Fender Rhodes electric piano, Arp Omni Omnichord, Mini-Moog synthesizer
- Louis Small - Fender Rhodes electric piano
- Eddie Martinez - guitar
- Jon Faddis, Randy Brecker - trumpet
- Alan Raph - trombone
- Brooks Tillotson - French horn
- Michael Brecker - tenor saxophone
- Eddie Daniels - alto saxophone
- Gene Orloff - concertmaster
- Carlos Franzetti - strings and horns conductor
- Isabelle Coles - lead vocals on "I Still Love You"
- Carol Sylvan, Melanie Moore, Yvette Flowers - backing vocals

== Charts ==
| Chart (1980) | Peak position |
|---|---|
| Billboard Pop Albums | 140 |
| Billboard Top Soul Albums | 24 |

=== Singles ===
| Year | Single | Chart positions | |
| Year | Single | US R&B | US Dance |
|---|---|---|---|
| 1980 | "Winners'" | 23 | 37 |
| 1980 | "Open Your Mind" | 86 | - |
