= Coming to America (The System song) =

Single by The System

from the album Coming to America Soundtrack
- Released: 1988
- Recorded: October 1987
- Genre: Pop; contemporary R&B
- Length: 3:33 (Part One version)
- Label: Atlantic; ATCO Records
- Songwriter(s): Nancy Huang, Nile Rodgers
- Producer(s): The System, Nile Rodgers

The System singles chronology
"Nighttime Lover" (1987)	"Coming to America" (1988)	"Midnight Special" (1989)

"Coming to America" is a song used in the movie Coming to America, starring Eddie Murphy. It was written by Nile Rodgers and Nancy Huang and performed by the American music band The System. The song played in the movie during the closing credits.

The song entered two Billboard charts in 1988, peaking at No. 23 on the Hot Black Singles chart and No. 91 on the Hot 100 chart.

It was the last commercially successful single recorded by the System.

== Track listing ==
12" vinyl (ATCO Records – DMD 1189)
No.	Title	Version	Length
1.	"Coming To America"	Independence Mix	5:45
2.	"Coming To America"	American Dub Mix	4:33
3.	"Coming To America"	Part Two	3:33

7" vinyl (ATCO Records – 7-99320)
No.	Title	Version	Length
1.	"Coming To America"	Part One	3:33
2.	"Coming To America"	Part Two	3:30

Promotional CD (Atlantic – PR 2352-2)
No.	Title	Version	Length
1.	"Coming To America"	Part One	3:33
2.	"Coming To America"	Part Two	3:33
3.	"Coming To America"	Independence Mix	5:45
4.	"Coming To America"	American Dub Mix	4:33

== Production ==
- Knut Bohn: mixing
- Michael Hutchinson: mixing
- Knut Bohn: engineer

== Chart performance ==
Chart (1988)	Peak position
U.S. Billboard Hot 100	91
U.S. Billboard Hot Black Singles	23
