= Bob Greenberg =

American record executive

Bob Greenberg (May 8, 1934 – September 11, 2009) was an American record executive. During his 50-year career as a record executive Greenberg worked with several companies including Warner Brothers, Atlantic Records, MGM/United Artists Records, and Mirage Records. Greenberg was born in New Haven, Connecticut. His first job in the music business was as a promoter for Eastern Allied Associated Record Distributors. From there he moved to Warner Brothers, eventually relocating to Los Angeles. His brother, Jerry Greenberg, recruited him to work at Atlantic, and the two co-founded Mirage. He worked with several successful artists including The Rolling Stones, AC/DC and Whitesnake. Later in his career he became the president of Hitmakers magazine. Greenberg died on September 11, 2009, in West Hills, Los Angeles after suffering from a stroke at the age of 75.
