= License to Dream =

Studio album by Kleeer
- Released: 1981
- Recorded: 1981
- Genres: Soul, funk
- Label: Atlantic
- Producers: Dennis King; Kleeer

Kleeer chronology
Winners (1979)	License to Dream (1981)	Get Ready (1982)

License to Dream is the third album by American New York City based Kleeer.

== Reception ==
Professional ratings
Review scores
Source	Rating
AllMusic	3/5 stars

Released in 1981, this album reached number thirteen on the Billboard Top Soul Albums chart, and the single "Get Tough" charted at number five on the Dance chart and number fifteen on the Soul Singles chart.

== Track listing ==
1. "De Kleeer Ting" (Norman Durham, Woody Cunningham) 4:41
2. "Running Back To You" (Woody Cunningham) 7:22
3. "Sippin' & Kissin'" (Norman Durham, Woody Cunningham) 4:15
4. "Hypnotized" (Richard Lee, Woody Cunningham) 3:40
5. "License to Dream" (Norman Durham, Woody Cunningham) 4:45
6. "Get Tough" (Norman Durham, Woody Cunningham) 8:17
7. "Say You Love Me" (Paul Crutchfield, Woody Cunningham) 4:41
8. "Where Would I Be (Without Your Love)" (Paul Crutchfield ) 4:22

== Personnel ==
- Norman Durham - Arp strings, bass, Clavinet, impersonations, percussion, vocals
- Woody Cunningham - bongos, cowbell, drums, impersonations, Oberheim, percussion, timbales, vocals
- Paul Crutchfield - congas, acoustic guitar, percussion, vocals
- Terry Dolphin - Fender Rhodes, piano, vibraphone
- Richard Lee - guitar
- Eric Rohrbaugh - Clavinet, Mini-Moog, sound effects
- Isabelle Coles, Yvette Flowers - lead vocals and backing vocals
- Carole Sylvan, Janice Pendarvis, Melanie Moore, Dennis King - backing vocals

== Charts ==
Chart (1981)	Peak position
Billboard Pop Albums	81
Billboard Top Soul Albums	13

=== Singles ===
Year	Single	Chart positions	
Year	Single	US R&B	US Dance
1981	"Get Tough'"	15	5
1981	"Running Back to You"	69	-
