= Seeekret =

Studio album by Kleeer
- Released: 1985
- Recorded: 1985
- Genre: Soul, funk
- Length: 36:50
- Label: Atlantic
- Producer: Eumir Deodato

Kleeer chronology
| Intimate Connection (1984) | Seeekret (1985) |

Professional ratings
Review scores
| Source | Rating |
|---|---|
| Allmusic | 2.5/5 stars |

Seeekret is the seventh and final album by American New York City based Kleeer.

== Track listing ==
1. "Take Your Heart Away" 6:14
2. "You Got Me Rockin'" 5:13
3. "Lay Ya Down Ez" 5:07
4. "Seeekret" 6:07
5. "Do Not Lie To Me" 4:57
6. "Never Cry Again" 4:49
7. "Call My Name" 4:23

== Personnel ==
- Norman Durham - bass, keyboards, lead and backing vocals
- Woody Cunningham - Percussion, lead and backing vocals
- Paul Crutchfield - Percussion, lead and backing vocals
- Richard Lee - guitar, backing vocals
- Eumir Deodato - synthesizer
- Keith O'Quinn - trombone
- Bob Malach - tenor saxophone
- Barbara Byrd, Christine Holmes - backing vocals

== Charts ==
=== Singles ===
| Year | Single | Chart positions |
| Year | Single | US R&B |
|---|---|---|
| 1985 | "Take Your Heart Away'" | 62 |
