= X-Periment =

Studio album by the System
- Released: 1984
- Recorded: 1983–1984
- Studios: Sorcerer, Soho, N.Y.
- Genres: Synthpop; dance rock
- Labels: Mirage/Atlantic (US); Polydor/PolyGram (UK)
- Producers: David Frank; Mic Murphy

The System chronology
Sweat (1983)	X-Periment (1984)	The Pleasure Seekers (1985)

X-Periment is the second studio album by American band the System, released in 1984. The album was produced by band members David Frank and Mic Murphy. It entered the Billboard pop albums chart in 1984.

== Critical reception ==
Professional ratings
Review scores
Source	Rating
The Village Voice	C+

The New York Times wrote that "there are all sorts of tricky sound effects and noise elements, provided by the inventive synthesizer player David Frank, but these effects never get in the way of the songs, which range from solid to memorable." The Philadelphia Daily News deemed the album "industrial strength but of prefabricated quality."

== Track listing ==
All songs written by Frank and Murphy except where noted.

Side A
No.	Title	Writer(s)	Length
1.	"I Wanna Make You Feel Good"	David Frank, Mic Murphy, Paul Pesco	4:20
2.	"Dangerous"	Frank, Murphy, Pesco	3:14
3.	"Lollipops and Everything"		3:55
4.	"Get Jumpin'"		3:46
5.	"Escape"		3:25

Side B
No.	Title	Writer(s)	Length
1.	"Promises Can Break"	Frank, Murphy, Pesco	4:10
2.	"X-Periment"		5:07
3.	"Bad Girl"		3:38
4.	"I Can't Take Losing You"		5:00

== Personnel ==
- Paul Pesco – electric guitar
- Mic Murphy – producer, performer, directed by, electric guitar, vocals
- David Frank – producer, performer, directed by, synthesizer, digital sounds

Production

- Mixing: Michael Brauer, Don Wershba
- Mastering: Greg Calbi, Michael Brauer
- Cover design: Brian Hagiwara
- Recorded by Mario Salvati

== Chart positions ==
Chart (1984)	Peak position
US Billboard Top LPs & Tape	182
