= Intimate Connection =

Studio album by Kleeer
- Released: April 14, 1984
- Recorded: November 1983 – February 1984
- Studio: Duplex Studio, New York City, New York; Acoustic piano recorded at Atlantic Studios, New York City, New York
- Genre: Soul, funk
- Length: 39:58
- Label: Atlantic
- Producer: Eumir Deodato

Kleeer chronology
Taste the Music (1982)	Intimate Connection (1984)	Seeekret (1985)

Professional ratings
Review scores
Source	Rating
Allmusic	3/5 stars

Intimate Connection is the sixth album by New York City-based band Kleeer released in 1984 and produced by Eumir Deodato.

== Track listing ==
1. "Ride It" (Woody Cunningham) 5:40
2. "You Did It Again" (Norman Durham, Paul Crutchfield) 4:30
3. "Go For It" (Woody Cunningham) 5:03
4. "Intimate Connection" (Woody Cunningham, Norman Durham) 4:45
5. "Next Time It's For Real" (Woody Cunningham, Norman Durham, Richard Lee) 5:20
6. "Break" (Paul Crutchfield, Woody Cunningham, Norman Durham) 5:00
7. "Tonight" (Norman Durham) 5:07
8. "Do You Want To?" (Eumir Deodato, Paul Crutchfield, Woody Cunningham, Norman Durham) 4:18

== Personnel ==
- Norman Durham - bass, synthesizer, electric piano, vocoder, lead and backing vocals
- Woody Cunningham - lead and backing vocals
- Paul Crutchfield - lead and backing vocals
- Richard Lee - lead guitar, rhythm guitar, backing vocals
- Kris Kellow - electric piano, acoustic piano, synthesizer
- Eumir Deodato - electric piano, synthesizer, vocoder
- Clifford Adams - trombone
- Michael Ray - trumpet
- Steven Greenfield - tenor and alto saxophone
- Debbie Cole, Diane Garisto - backing vocals

== Charts ==
Chart (1984)	Peak position
Billboard Soul Albums	49
