= Marked for Death (soundtrack) =

Delicious Vinyl Presents Music From The Motion Picture Marked For Death

Soundtrack album to Marked for Death by various artists
- Released: September 27, 1990
- Genres: Hip hop; R&B; reggae
- Length: 1:07:05
- Label: Delicious Vinyl
- Producers: Ansel Collins; Bobby "Digital" Dixon; David Frank; Def Jef; Fil Brown; James Newton Howard; Jimmy Cliff; Matt Dike; Michael Ross; The Brand New Heavies; Peter Tosh; Rick Rubin; Steven Seagal; Tony G.; Tony Robinson; Wendell Greene

Singles from Delicious Vinyl Presents Music From The Motion Picture Marked For Death
- 1. "I Wanna Do Something Freaky to You" Released: September 14, 1990; 2. "Pick Up The Pace (1990)" Released: 1990

Delicious Vinyl Presents Music From The Motion Picture Marked For Death is the soundtrack compilation album to Dwight H. Little's 1990 action film Marked for Death. It was released on September 27, 1990 through Delicious Vinyl and consists of a blend of hip hop, R&B and reggae music.

Production was helmed by Michael Ross and Steven Seagal, who also served as executive producers, Matt Dike, Ansel Collins, Def Jef, Jimmy Cliff, Bobby "Digital" Dixon, David Frank, Fil Brown, James Newton Howard, The Brand New Heavies, Peter Tosh, Rick Rubin, Tony G., Tony Robinson and Wendell Greene, with additional producers Erick Vaan and Steve "Silk" Hurley.

It features contributions from Jimmy Cliff and the Oneness Band, the Brand New Heavies, Attic Black, Body & Soul, Def Jef, James Newton Howard, Kenyatta, Masters of Reality, Mellow Man Ace, Papa Juggy, Peter Tosh, Shabba Ranks, Tom Scott, Tone-Lōc, Young MC, and the film star Steven Seagal.

== Track listing ==
No.	Title	Producer(s)	Length
1.	"I Wanna Do Something Freaky to You" (performed by Kenyatta)	Matt Dike; Michael Ross	4:39
2.	"I Joke But I Don't Play" (performed by Tone-Lōc)	Matt Dike; Michael Ross	4:29
3.	"Roots & Culture" (performed by Shabba Ranks)	Bobby "Digital" Dixon	4:01
4.	"Put the Funk Back in It" (performed by The Brand New Heavies)	The Brand New Heavies	3:22
5.	"Welcome to My Groove" (performed by Mellow Man Ace)	Tony G.; Steve "Silk" Hurley (add.)	4:53
6.	"Quiet Passion" (performed by N'Dea Davenport)	Fil Brown; Tony Robinson	4:41
7.	"Domino" (performed by Masters of Reality)	Rick Rubin	3:49
8.	"The Shadow of Death" (performed by Def Jef and Papa Juggy)	Def Jef; DJ Erick Vaan (add.)	4:29
9.	"Ya Gets None" (performed by Body & Soul)	Def Jef	5:09
10.	"Rats Chase Cats" (performed by Attic Black)	Wendell Greene	3:48
11.	"Pick Up the Pace (1990)" (performed by Young MC)	Matt Dike; Michael Ross	3:45
12.	"Weapons Montage" (performed by James Newton Howard and Tom Scott)	James Newton Howard	2:08
13.	"John Crow" (performed by Jimmy Cliff, Steven Seagal and the Oneness Band)	David Frank; Steven Seagal	3:47
14.	"Steppin' Razor" (performed by Peter Tosh)	Peter Tosh	5:48
15.	"No Justice" (performed by Jimmy Cliff)	Ansel Collins; Jimmy Cliff	4:01
16.	"Rebel In Me" (performed by Jimmy Cliff)	Ansel Collins; Jimmy Cliff	4:06
Total length:			1:07:05

Notes

- Tracks 4—6 and 9—12 are not featured in the film.
