= Kleeer =

American New York-based funk and disco band

Background information
- Also known as: The Jam Band; Pipeline; The Universal Robot Band
- Origin: New York City, New York, United States
- Genres: Funk, disco, post-disco
- Years active: 1972–1985
- Labels: Atlantic Records
- Past members: Richard Lee; Norman Durham (deceased); Paul Crutchfield; Woody Cunningham (deceased)

Kleeer was an American New York City–based funk, disco and post-disco band, which was formed in 1972 under the name The Jam Band, as a backup group to different disco bands and vocalists.

== Members ==
- Woodrow "Woody" Cunningham (lead vocalist and drummer, died 2010)
- Paul Crutchfield (percussionist and keyboardist)
- Richard Lee (guitarist)
- Norman Durham (bassist, died 2011)

== Career ==
After a switch to the name Pipeline in 1975, the group also decided to switch to making hard rock instead of disco. Record labels competed to sign them but, when they finally ended up at Columbia Records, their single "Gypsy Rider" did not fare well commercially.

In 1976, they got the opportunity to become The Universal Robot Band along with underground disco producers Patrick Adams and Greg Carmichael. This project was more successful than their former projects. They made the single "Barely Breaking Even" alongside singer Leroy Burgess, and they also recorded an album. The group toured as The Universal Robot Band until 1978. After 1978, the band decided to make all their music themselves under the new name of Kleeer.

Between 1979 and 1985 the group released seven albums and had several hits in the US Billboard Hot 100 and in R&B charts. The most mentionable are "Keep Your Body Workin'", "Tonight's the Night", "Winners", "Intimate Connection", and "Get Tough". The sound was now more focused on 1980s style funk, and electronic instruments, like vocoders and synthesizers.

The System lead singer Mic Murphy was a road manager for the band before the start of his record career.

After the 1985's album Seeekret, the band disappeared for unknown reasons. Most of the musicians continued working with other projects. In the 1990s, however, the group re-formed as Kleeer at some occasions.

== Discography ==
=== Studio albums ===
Year	Single	Peak chart positions		
Year	Single	US	US R&B	UK
1979	I Love to Dance	—	53	—
1979	Winners	140	24	—
1981	License to Dream	81	13	—
1982	Get Ready	—	—	—
1982	Taste the Music	139	31	—
1984	Intimate Connection	—	49	—
1985	Seeekret	—	—	96
"—" denotes releases that did not chart.

=== Singles ===
Year	Single	Peak chart positions				Album
Year	Single	US	US R&B	US Dance	UK	Album
1979	"Tonight's the Night (Good Time)"	—	33	—	—	I Love to Dance
1979	"Keeep Your Body Workin'"	101	60	54	51	I Love to Dance
1980	"Winners"	—	23	37	—	Winners
1980	"Open Your Mind"	—	86	—	—	Winners
1981	"Running Back to You"	—	69	—	—	License to Dream
1981	"Get Tough"	—	15	5	49	License to Dream
1981	"License to Dream"	—	—	5	—	License to Dream
1981	"De Kleeer Ting"	—	—	5	—	License to Dream
1982	"Taste the Music"	—	55	31	—	Taste the Music
1982	"De Ting Continues"	—	74	—	—	Taste the Music
1983	"She Said She Loves Me"	—	84	—	—	Get Ready
1984	"Intimate Connection"	—	48	—	—	Intimate Connection
1984	"Next Time It's for Real"	—	79	—	—	Intimate Connection
1985	"Take Your Heart Away"	—	62	—	86	Seeekret
"—" denotes releases that did not chart or were not released in that territory.
