= Jerry L. Greenberg =

American music executive

Jerry Greenberg
- Jerry Greenberg - President
- Born: 1942 (age 83–84); New Haven, Connecticut, U.S.
- Occupation: Music executive
- Website: miragemusicentertainment.com

Jerry L. Greenberg is an American music executive who became the president of Atlantic Records in 1974. He was the youngest president of any major record company in the recording industry at 32.

He started his career in the music business as a drummer in the band "Jerry Green and The Passengers" which he founded. The band recorded for Atlantic Records, Roulette Records, United Artists, and DCP Record labels. By the age of eighteen years, Greenberg had his own record label, called Green-Sea Records.

During his tenure as president of several major labels, Jerry has signed such acts as ABBA, The Blues Brothers, Foreigner, Genesis, T. S. Monk, Whitesnake, Dr. Dre & Eazy-E (Production Deal), Motörhead, Brownstone and 3T. Jerry also introduced Mariah Carey to Tommy Mottola.

In addition to signing acts Jerry has worked with some of the greatest artists in music including, AC/DC, Aretha Franklin, Bad Company, Bee Gees, Crosby Stills Nash & Young, Dr. John, Dusty Springfield, Eagles, Emerson, Lake & Palmer, Eric Clapton, Led Zeppelin, The Rolling Stones, Yes, and Michael Jackson.

== Biography ==
=== Jerry Green and The Passengers ===
1957 - Gerald L. Greenberg from New Haven, Connecticut formed his own band. The band recorded for Atlantic Records, Roulette Records, United Artists, and DCP Records as Jerry Green and The Passengers. By the age of eighteen, Greenberg already had his own record label, called Green-Sea Records.

=== Seaboard Distributors ===
1964 - Greenberg joined Seaboard Distributors in Hartford, Connecticut, as a record promoter, where he promoted records to radio stations for such labels as Atlantic Records, Chess Records, Liberty Records, Mercury Records, Philips, Roulette Records, and many others.

=== Gerald Wexler ===
1967 - Jerry Wexler asked Greenberg to become his personal assistant at Atlantic Records. At that time, Wexler was Vice President of Atlantic Records, and was the producer of Aretha Franklin, Dusty Springfield, Dr. John, and many others. Wexler taught Greenberg all about recording, producing, finding songs, and the day-to-day tasks of running a major label.

=== General Manager of Atlantic Records ===
1969 - When Atlantic's parent company, Warner Bros-Seven Arts was sold to Kinney Services (Predecessor to Warner Communications in 1969, Greenberg was announced General Manager of Atlantic Records. Jerry Wexler spent a majority of his time in Florida, which left Greenberg plenty of time to spend with Ahmet Ertegun, who was President of Atlantic at that time.

=== Vice President of Radio Promotion and Artists and Repertoire ===
1972 - Within five years, Greenberg held two titles; Vice President of Radio Promotion, and Vice President of Artists and Repertoire for Atlantic Records.

=== Ahmet Ertegun announces new President ===
1974 - Ahmet Ertegun, Chairman of Atlantic Records, announced Greenberg as President of Atlantic Records, making him the youngest president of a major record company at 32. Greenberg was then signing artists and overseeing the company on a daily basis.

=== Mirage is Born ===
1980 - Jerry Greenberg became a consultant to Atlantic while forming his own label with his brother, Bob Greenberg, called Mirage Music; Jerry remained on the East Coast, Bob on the West Coast.

=== MGM/United Artists Music ===
1986 - Greenberg was named President of MGM/United Artists. During his tenure at United Artists Music, he was executive producer for the soundtrack to the movie 'Karate Kid 2,' which went gold. With Chairman Jerry Weintraub leaving the company abruptly, the new management team didn't want to continue having a recording company. Greenberg was asked to stay on and produce movie soundtracks, and in turn, ended up working with such greats as Mel Brooks on the soundtrack for the 1987 comedy, 'Spaceballs.'

=== Atco Records ===
1988 - Greenberg was asked to return to Atlantic Records as President of Atco Records, which was Atlantic's other label based in California. Once there, he continued to sign major artists, including Michel'le and JJ Fad, produced by Dr. Dre and Eazy-E. Both albums went platinum, and it was the first rap album to go platinum for WEA Distribution. He also signed a platinum rock group from England, The Escape Club, and served as executive producer of the soundtrack to the hit motion picture, Coming to America, starring Eddie Murphy.

=== WTG (Walter (Yetnikoff), Tommy (Motolla), Gerald (Greenberg) Records ===
1989 - Tommy Mottola, who took over Sony Music, offered Greenberg a label in California. Gerald was the third person Mottola hired on his team and let him form his own label as President of WTG Records.

=== MJJ Music (Michael Jackson) ===
1993 - Sony artist Michael Jackson offered Greenberg the position of president of MJJ Music, Jackson's label distributed through Sony. Greenberg served as president and CEO of MJJ Music from 1993 to 2000.

=== Westwood One ===
1994 - Greenberg was elected to the Board of Directors of Westwood One, the world's #1 supplier of talk, sports, radio, news, and shows all over the world. He currently sits on this Board as the Chairman of the Compensation Committee.

=== Mirage Music is reactivated ===
2003–04 - Mirage Music Entertainment was reactivated with a distribution deal through Sony Music. In addition, Mirage opened a subsidiary office in Jamaica with Stacy Greenberg as General Manager and an office in Las Vegas, NV.

=== Rainbow Bar & Grill Expansion Group ===
2005 - Jerry & Bob Greenberg formed the Rainbow Bar & Grill Expansion Group. They licensed the name from America's No. 1 Rock & Roll Restaurant on Sunset Strip in Hollywood. The first restaurant opened in June 2005 in Las Vegas, across from the Hard Rock Hotel.

The Rainbow Bar & Grill in Las Vegas recreates the Hollywood location with red leather booths and rock-n-roll memorabilia adorning the walls.

=== MusiCares ===
2007 - Jerry Greenberg joined the board of MusiCares established in 1989 by The Recording Academy. MusiCares is a non-profit organization that aims to provide a safety net of assistance for people in the music industry in times of need. MusiCares services and resources cover a wide range of financial, medical and personal emergencies.

=== Mirage Music Entertainment ===
2009 to 2011 - Mirage Tribute Bands was formed. MTB handled tribute bands Led Zepagain (Led Zeppelin tribute band), Rolling the Stones (The Rolling Stones tribute band), ABBACADABRA (ABBA tribute band), Bonfire (AC/DC tribute band), Bella Donna (Stevie Nicks tribute band), The Long Run (Eagles tribute band), Fan Halen (Van Halen tribute band) and others. MTB presented Bring Back the Music every Wednesday night at the Hilton Hotel (now Westgate) in Las Vegas.

=== PEM Records ===
2013 to Present - Greenberg formed new EDM label with partners from Ibiza, Spain. PEM offices are located in Ibiza and Beverly Hills, Calif. PEM partnership.

== Artists signed by Jerry Greenberg ==
=== Atlantic Records ===
- J. Geils Band
- ABBA
- Archie Bell and the Drells
- Blue Magic
- The Blues Brothers
- Cerrone
- Firefall
- Foreigner
- Gary Numan
- Genesis
- Major Harris
- Roxy Music
- Trammps
- Jackie Moore
- Yusef Lateef

=== Mirage Music ===
- Brenda K Starr
- Gerard McMann
- Nolan Thomas
- Phoebe Snow
- Robin Gibb
- Shannon
- South Side Johnny
- TS Monk
- Whitesnake
- Spinners
- Xavion

=== Atco Records ===
- Dr. Dre & Eazy-E (Production Deal)
- Escape Club
- Michel'le
- JJ Fad
- R.B. Greaves
- Acker Bilk

=== WTG/Sony Records ===
- Pauly Shore
- Eddie Griffin
- Johnny Crash
- Jimmy Harnen
- 8th Wonder
- Jason Bonham Band
- Hand of Fate
- Louie Louie
- Motörhead
- Stephanie

=== M.J.J./Sony Music ===
- 3T
- Brownstone
- Quo
- Rebbie Jackson
- Tatyana Ali
- Nathan Cavaleri
- Men Of Vizion
- Tasha Scott
