= Rhythm & Romance (The System album) =

Studio album by the System
- Released: 1989
- Recorded: 1988–1989
- Genre: New jack swing; garage house; dance-pop; electro
- Length: 53:47
- Label: Atlantic
- Producer: David Frank, Mic Murphy

The System chronology
Don't Disturb This Groove (1987)	Rhythm & Romance (1989)	ESP (2000)

Professional ratings
Review scores
Source	Rating
AllMusic	2/5 stars

Rhythm & Romance is the fifth and final studio album by the System. It was released in Japan and United States under Atlantic Records in 1989. It reached the position 85 on the Billboard R&B Albums chart.

The album was influenced by the contemporary R&B sound of new jack swing and hip-hop styles. It would be the group's last album before they disbanded.

== Track listing ==
All tracks composed by David Frank and Michael Murphy

1. "I'm About You" – 4:13
2. "Soul to Soul" – 5:22
3. "Wicked" – 4:25
4. "Midnight Special" – 3:53
5. "I Don't Know How to Say..." – 4:36
6. " I Wanna Be Your Lover" – 4:04
7. "You Got Me (Where You Want Me)" – 4:06
8. "Have Mercy" – 5:03
9. "Face the Music" – 4:48
10. "Think About It" – 4:51

Japanese bonus tracks
No.	Title	Length
11.	"Guardian Angel"	5:01
12.	"Diggin' Your Rhythm"	3:25

== Production ==
- Bob Defrin – art direction
- Herb Powers – mastering
- Roy Volkmann – photography
- Leroy Quintyn – Assistant technician (tracks 01 to 06, 08 to 10)
- Bob Rosa – mixing (tracks 01, 02)
- Keith Cohen – mixing (tracks 03, 04, 06, 08, 10, 12)
- Steve Peck - mixing (track 05)
- Ray Bardani - mixing (track 11)
- Stephen Seltzer - mixing (tracks 07, 09); recording (tracks 01, 03, 05 to 10, 12)
- Rob Feaster - recording (tracks 02 to 04, 10, 11)

== Personnel ==
- David Frank - keyboards
- Mic Murphy - lead and backing vocals
- Paul Pesco - guitar ("Soul to Soul")
- Mike Campbell - guitar ("Midnight Special" and "Think About It")
- Chep Nuñez, Cindy Mizelle, B.J. Nelson, Yogi Lee – additional backing vocals
- Errol "Crusher" Bennett, Bashiri Johnson – percussion
- Cut Creator – scratching
- Dupont, Leroy Quintyn, Robert Dukes, Mic Murphy - Science Lab Posse on "Face the Music"

== Chart performance ==
Chart (1989)	Peak position
U.S. Billboard Top R&B Albums	85
