= The Pleasure Seekers (album) =

Studio album by the System
- Released: 1985
- Recorded: 1984–85
- Studio: Unique Studio in a Big City, Atlantic Studios, N.Y.
- Genre: Dance-pop; R&B; synth-pop
- Label: Mirage/Atlantic
- Producer: David Frank, Mic Murphy

The System chronology
X-Periment (1984)	The Pleasure Seekers (1985)	Don't Disturb This Groove (1987)

Singles from The Pleasure Seekers
- 1. "The Pleasure Seekers" Released: 1985; 2. "This Is for You" Released: 1985

The Pleasure Seekers is the third album recorded by American band the System, released in the United States under the Mirage-Atlantic label.

== Description ==
The album was produced by its band members, namely David Frank and Mic Murphy. Commercially successful singles from this album include "The Pleasure Seekers" and "This Is for You".

The album entered the Billboard R&B Albums chart in 1985.

Guest vocals on "The Pleasure Seekers" include Audrey Wheeler of Unlimited Touch.

== Track listing ==
^{All songs written by Frank and Murphy.}

Side A
No.	Title	Length
1.	"The Pleasure Seekers"	4:39
2.	"It Takes 2"	4:12
3.	"Big City Beat"	3:25
4.	"Love Won't Wait for Lovin'"	4:47

Side B
No.	Title	Length
1.	"This Is for You"	4:57
2.	"My Radio Rocks"	3:45
3.	"Did In by a Friend"	3:11
4.	"I Don't Run from Danger"	4:45

== Personnel ==
- Paul Pesco - electric guitar
- Jimmy Maelen - percussion
- David Frank - producer, keyboards, arrangements
- Mic Murphy - producer, vocals, arrangements

Production

- Engineer: Tom Lord-Alge
- Mixing: Tom Lord-Alge
- Art direction: Bob Defrin
- Mastering: Dennis King
- Photography: Roy Volkmann
- Assistant technician: Acar Key

== Chart positions ==
Chart (1985)	Peak position
US R&B Albums	40
