= Paul Pesco =

American session guitarist

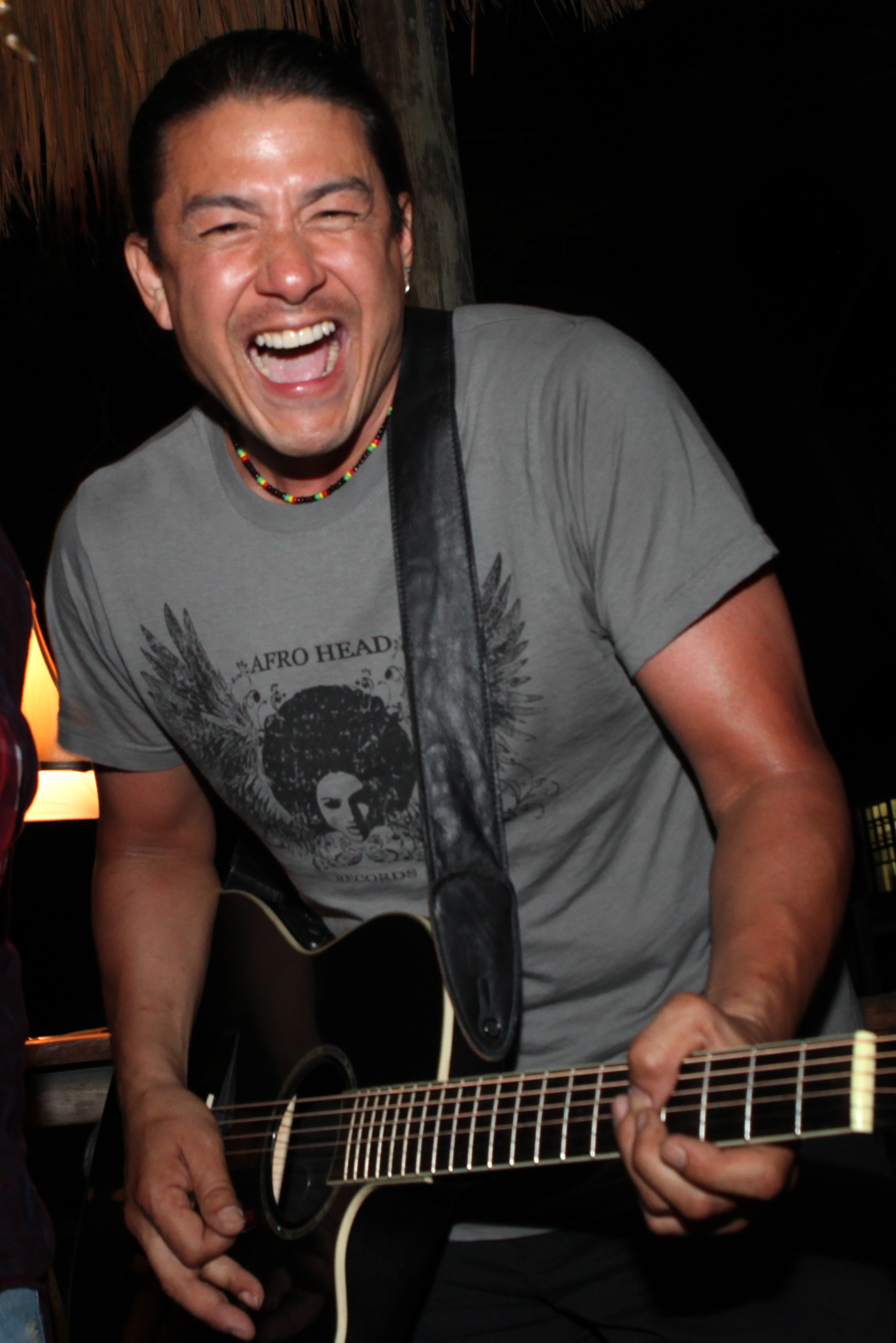
- Pesco in June 2013

Background information
- Born: May 13, 1959 (age 67); Canandaigua, New York, U.S.
- Genres: Pop, funk, jazz fusion
- Occupations: Session musician, film score composer
- Instruments: Guitar, bass guitar, keyboards

Paul Pesco (born May 13, 1959) is an American session guitarist, singer-songwriter, film score composer and record producer.

== Biography ==
Pesco was born in Canandaigua, New York, to a Sicilian father (an opera singer and voice instructor) and Korean mother (an author). The family lived for a time in Germany during Paul's youth before returning to New York. He graduated from Northport High School in 1977. As of November 2012, Pesco resides in Millbrook, New York, where he maintains a home recording studio.

Beginning on the piano, Pesco would gradually build up a working proficiency with several different instruments before finding a natural fit with the guitar. He began seriously pursuing a career in music by working as a rehearsal technician at S.I.R. Studios, where he had brushes with numerous prominent artists. Having already played on some early sessions by a then-relatively unknown Madonna, Pesco was offered a position as a "utility man" (playing second guitar and keyboards) with Atlantic Starr on the band's 1982 tour, which would be his first prolific gig. Following this tour, Pesco was again recruited by Madonna to record on her self-titled debut album.

Soon thereafter, Pesco joined up with the innovative techno funk group the System, performing on the band's studio albums as well as tours and becoming an instrumental part of launching the group's career. It was through his work with the System that he first came to the attention of the group Hall & Oates, with whom he would soon develop a long-term association.

These early gigs segued into future sessions with other high-profile artists, and his session career blossomed from there. He played on demos for disco artist Lourett Russell Grant. He became an in-demand session player throughout the 1980s and has remained one of the most sought-after session musicians into the present.

Meanwhile, Pesco had also maintained his working relationship with Madonna, having recorded and toured with her (the first album, songs "Lucky Star" and "Burning Up" as well as The Virgin Tour in 1985 and the Erotica album and subsequent Girlie Show World Tour in 1993). The Madonna demos on which he had played guitar prior to touring with Atlantic Starr initially secured her recording contract with Sire Records in the early 1980s, which have since been released as the Pre-Madonna album.

=== Other highlights ===
In 1986, Pesco played on Steve Winwood's album Back in the High Life (on the song "The Finer Things") and on tour.

In 1989, Pesco released a solo album, Make It Reality, which featured himself on lead vocals, guitar, and often other instruments, backed by other session musicians.

In 1991, Pesco joined C+C Music Factory, creating the guitar parts for "Gonna Make You Sweat (Everybody Dance Now)", "Things That Make You Go Hmmm...", among many other songs.

In 2001, he became musical director and guitarist for Jennifer Lopez, for her promotional tour and NBC music special. Pesco had worked with J-Lo in the studio, playing guitar on the song "Play" from her second album J.Lo.

In late 2002, he joined the house band for morning talk show The Wayne Brady Show on ABC. Around the same time, he worked on several film soundtracks including Around the Bend, Be Cool, Happy Feet and Robots with composer John Powell, the Brando documentary and the comedic short film, Basta Pasta with composer Andrea Morricone.

Pesco has also composed and performed on soundtracks for films such as Roxanne, Earth Girls Are Easy, Buffy the Vampire Slayer, Encino Man, Wild Orchid, Coming to America, Fried Green Tomatoes, Boca and Tap.

In 2005, Pesco co-composed the musical score for the documentary film The Canary Effect from director Robin Davey.

Pesco has recorded and toured with Joan Baez.

He is a member and co-producer of John Blackwell's John Blackwell Project (4ever Jia album).

He is also a member of drummer Dave Weckl's group (Multiplicity album).

=== Association with Hall and Oates ===
Pesco was the lead guitarist and musical director of the rock and soul duo Hall & Oates. He also performed the same role for Daryl Hall's successful reality music television program, Live from Daryl's House, and toured with Hall's solo band.

H&O were aware of Pesco because of his studio track record with the System, and also his prolific work with many other artists. Initially, that led to Pesco playing guitar on their Ooh Yeah! album in 1988. He joined Hall & Oates again in 1996 for the recording sessions and tour for the Marigold Sky album.

He remained with the band until 2001, when he began working with Jennifer Lopez.

In 2010, Pesco rejoined Hall & Oates upon the death of the band's longtime bassist, Tom "T-Bone" Wolk. He remained with the band through 2013 and had a highly visible role during Live from Daryl's House broadcasts.

On January 6, 2014, Pesco publicly acknowledged his departure from the Live from Daryl's House show and the Hall & Oates band. On his Facebook page, Pesco wrote, "I am no longer involved with LFDH or H&O ... I was replaced ... Not sure why ... Sorry that I couldn't be more informative." He added, "No one is more disappointed than I am ... I loved being a part of LFDH." He concluded, "Sometimes the tail wags the dog. I think Daryl and John made a decision based on misinformation and lies... It's a shame..."

He appeared on June 26 at Summerfest 2014 in Milwaukee.

== Gear / endorsements ==
- Suhr Guitars, amps and pedals
- ESP Guitars
- Taylor Guitars
- Seymour Duncan Pickups
- DR Handmade Strings
- Line 6 digital effects
- Fishman Pickups
- Empirical Labs
- QSC Audio Products
- PreSonus StudioLive
- Quilter Labs (Amps)
- Tronical
- Cusack Pedals
- Soundtoys Plugins
- PRA WiC digital wireless systems for guitar

== Solo discography ==
=== Album ===
- Make It Reality (Sire), 1989

=== Singles ===
- "Black Is Black" (Sire)
- "I'm Hypnotized" (Sire)
- "The Politics of Love" (Sire)

== Collaborations ==
| Year | Album | Artist | Role |
|---|---|---|---|
| 2021 | A Sailor from the moon (Mike Blum Remix) | Lord feat. Begüm Günceler & Tom Hooker | Guitar |
| 2013 | Sex, Love & Reggae | Gyptian | Guitar |
| 2012 | All of Me | Estelle | Guitar |
| 2012 | Kaleidoscope Dream | Miguel | Composer, Guitar |
| 2012 | The Crossing | Sophie B. Hawkins | Guitar |
| 2011 | Endless Planets | Austin Peralta | Mixing, producer |
| 2011 | Laughing Down Crying | Daryl Hall | Composer, Guitar (Acoustic), Guitar (Electric), Photography, producer |
| 2011 | My Life II... The Journey Continues (Act 1) | Mary J. Blige | Guitar |
| 2010 | By Request (album) | Paulo Gonzo | Guitar |
| 2010 | Sacred Journey of Ku-Kai Vol. 4 | Kitaro | Guitar (Acoustic), Guitar (Electric) |
| 2009 | Do What You Want, Be What You Are: The Music of Daryl Hall & John Oates | Daryl Hall & John Oates | Composer |
| 2009 | The Collection | Whitney Houston | Guitar |
| 2009 | The Element of Freedom | Alicia Keys | Guitar (Acoustic), Guitar (Electric) |
| 2009 | The End: A New Beginning | John Krondes | Guitar (Electric) |
| 2008 | Greatest Hits (Steel Box Collection) | Cyndi Lauper | Main Personnel |
| 2008 | Original Album Classics | Cyndi Lauper | Main Personnel |
| 2007 | Jazz Club: Jazz for the Road | | Guitar (Electric) |
| 2007 | Sacred Journey of Ku-Kai Vol. 3 | Kitaro | Guitar (Electric) |
| 2006 | Fresh and Furious: Hip Hop's Beginning | Grandmaster Flash | Drum Programming, Guitar |
| 2006 | Happy Feet Original Soundtrack | | Guitar |
| 2006 | Reflections (A Retrospective) | Mary J. Blige | Guitar |
| 2006 | Spiritual Garden | Kitaro | Guitar, Main Personnel |
| 2005 | Abdel Wright | Abdel Wright | Guitar, Main Personnel |
| 2005 | Multiplicity | Dave Weckl | Guitar, Member of Attributed Artist |
| 2005 | Robots Original Score | John Powell | Bagpipes |
| 2005 | Sounds of Life: A Musical Journey for Childbirth and Beyond | | Guitar |
| 2005 | The Essential Daryl Hall & John Oates | Daryl Hall & John Oates | Composer, lyricist |
| 2005 | X-Periment/Pleasure Seekers | The System | Composer, Guitar |
| 2004 | Seldom Blues | Alexander Zonjic | Guest Artist, Guitar, Main Personnel |
| 2004 | Ultimate Daryl Hall + John Oates | Daryl Hall & John Oates | Composer |
| 2003 | Do It for Love | Daryl Hall & John Oates | Composer, Guitar (Acoustic) |
| 2003 | Live in Concert | Daryl Hall & John Oates | Composer |
| 2003 | Sacred Journey of Ku-Kai | Kitaro | Guitar (Electric), Slide Guitar |
| 2003 | Sophistication | Grady Nichols | Guitar, Guitar (Rhythm), Main Personnel, Soloist |
| 2002 | O2 | O-Town | Guest Artist, Guitar (Acoustic), Guitar (Electric) |
| 2002 | Duboc | Carol Duboc | Guitar |
| 2002 | Groovology | Gerald Albright | Guest Artist, Guitar (Electric) |
| 2002 | VH1 Behind the Music: The Daryl Hall and John Oates Collection | Daryl Hall & John Oates | Composer |
| 2001 | Ballads | Mary J. Blige | Guitar |
| 2001 | Dirty Little Secret | Stella Soleil | Guest Artist, Guitar |
| 2001 | Hypnotic | Paul Taylor | Guitar, Main Personnel |
| 2001 | J.Lo | Jennifer Lopez | Guitar |
| 2001 | Love Session | Silk | Guest Artist, Guitar |
| 2001 | MYOB | Deborah Gibson | Guitar |
| 2001 | The Very Best of Miki Howard | Miki Howard | Guitar, Main Personnel |
| 2000 | Against All Odds | Take 5 | Guitar |
| 2000 | Another Rosie Christmas | Rosie O'Donnell | Guitar |
| 2000 | Love Songs | Najee | Guitar |
| 2000 | Movimiento perpetuo | Sentidos Opuestos | Guitar |
| 2000 | Tamar | Tamar Braxton | Guitar |
| 2000 | X | K-Ci & JoJo | Guitar |
| 1999 | G | Gerald Levert | Guitar |
| 1999 | Mary | Mary J. Blige | Guitar |
| 1999 | On the 6 | Jennifer Lopez | Guitar |
| 1999 | Smoke This | Lynch Mob | Engineer, Guest Artist, Guitar, Keyboards, producer, Vox Organ |
| 1999 | The Game | Chico DeBarge | Guitar |
| 1999 | Tonight | Silk | Guitar |
| 1998 | All the Colors | Sonny Southon | Guest Artist, Guitar |
| 1998 | For Art's Sake | Art Porter Jr. | Guitar |
| 1998 | Pre-Madonna | Madonna | Guitar |
| 1998 | Midnight | Jeff Lorber | Guitar |
| 1997 | Forever More | Charito | Guitar, Percussion |
| 1997 | Marigold Sky | Daryl Hall & John Oates | Guitar |
| 1996 | Billy Mann | Billy Mann | Guitar (Electric), Sitar |
| 1996 | Ladae! | Ladae! | Guitar |
| 1996 | Second Wind | Herb Alpert | Guest Artist, Guitar |
| 1996 | The Craft | | Guitar |
| 1996 | Women: Live from Mountain Stage | | Guitar, Vocals (Background) |
| 1995 | Faith | Faith Evans | Unknown Contributor Role |
| 1995 | Let's Go Bang | Jennifer Love Hewitt | Guitar (Electric) |
| 1995 | Ring Them Bells | Joan Baez | Dobro, Guitar, Vocals |
| 1995 | Roberta | Roberta Flack | Guitar (Acoustic), Guitar (Electric) |
| 1995 | The Finer Things | Steve Winwood | Guitar |
| 1995 | Your Heart's in Good Hands | Al Green | Guitar |
| 1994 | Always & Forever | Eternal | Guitar, Sitar |
| 1994 | Cindy Mizelle | Cindy Mizelle | Guitar |
| 1994 | My Life | Mary J. Blige | Guitar |
| 1994 | Undercover | Art Porter Jr. | Guitar, Guitar (Electric), Wah Wah Guitar |
| 1994 | Vive en mí | Manuel Mijares | Guitar |
| 1994 | West Side Stories | Jeff Lorber | Guitar (Rhythm), Wah Wah Guitar |
| 1993 | The Colour of My Love | Celine Dion | Guitar |
| 1993 | Music Box | Mariah Carey | Guitar |
| 1993 | 21 Really Cool Songs | Sugar Beats | Musician, Unknown Contributor Role |
| 1993 | A Matter of Time | Vertical Hold | Guitar |
| 1993 | L.A. Blues Authority Volume II: Glenn Hughes – Blues | Glenn Hughes | Guitar |
| 1993 | Call Me Nightlife | Nokko | Guitar |
| 1993 | Don't Look Back | Al Green | Guitar |
| 1993 | I'm No Angel | Carole Davis | Bass, composer, engineer, Guitar, producer, Vocals (Background) |
| 1993 | Magical Duos | | Saxophone |
| 1993 | Nick Scotti | Nick Scotti | Guitar |
| 1993 | The Donna Summer Anthology | Donna Summer | Guitar |
| 1992 | Celine Dion | Celine Dion | Guitar |
| 1992 | Buffy the Vampire Slayer Original Soundtrack | | Guitar, Keyboards |
| 1992 | Cool | Bob James | Guest Artist, Guitar (Rhythm) |
| 1992 | Deeper and Deeper | Madonna | Guitar |
| 1992 | Encino Man Original Soundtrack | | Guitar, Programming |
| 1992 | Erotica | Madonna | Guitar |
| 1992 | Exposé | Exposé | Guitar |
| 1992 | Greatest Remixes Vol. 1 | Clivillés & Cole | Guitar, Vocals |
| 1992 | Just an Illusion | Najee | Guitar |
| 1992 | Live | Patti Austin | Guitar |
| 1992 | Pocket City | Art Porter Jr. | Guitar |
| 1992 | Sin Red | Valeria Lynch | Guitar |
| 1992 | Sofia Shinas | Sofia Shinas | Guitar |
| 1992 | Time for Love | Freddie Jackson | Guitar |
| 1992 | Tyler | Tyler Collins | Guitar, Guitar (Acoustic) |
| 1991 | Aidalai | Mecano | Guest Artist |
| 1991 | Different Story | Deborah Blando | Guitar |
| 1991 | Emotions | Mariah Carey | Guitar |
| 1991 | Just One Night | Samantha Fox | Guitar |
| 1991 | Mistaken Identity | Donna Summer | Guitar, Guitar (Acoustic) |
| 1991 | No More Games/The Remix Album | New Kids on the Block | Unknown Contributor Role |
| 1991 | Ricca | Ricca | Guitar |
| 1991 | Victims | Steel Pulse | Guitar |
| 1991 | What Comes Naturally | Sheena Easton | Guitar |
| 1990 | Mariah Carey | Mariah Carey | Guitar |
| 1990 | Unison | Celine Dion | Guitar |
| 1990 | 1990 | David Rudder | Composer |
| 1990 | Contribution | Mica Paris | Guitar |
| 1990 | Gonna Make You Sweat | C+C Music Factory | Guitar |
| 1990 | Make the Difference | Tracie Spencer | Guitar |
| 1990 | Anything Is Possible | Debbie Gibson | Guitar |
| 1990 | Swingin' | Dino | Guest Artist, Guitar |
| 1990 | Wild Orchid Original Soundtrack | | Associate Producer, composer, producer |
| 1989 | 24/7 | Dino | Guitar |
| 1989 | A Night to Remember | Cyndi Lauper | Guitar |
| 1989 | Desert Wind | Ofra Haza | Guitar |
| 1989 | Home | Stephanie Mills | Guitar |
| 1989 | Master of the Game | James "J.T." Taylor | Guitar |
| 1989 | Passion in the Heart | Shirley Lewis | Guitar |
| 1989 | Raw | Alyson Williams | Guest Artist, Guitar |
| 1989 | Riverdance | Peter Moffitt | Guitar, Guitar (Acoustic), Guitar (Electric) |
| 1989 | So Happy | Eddie Murphy | Guitar |
| 1988 | CK | Chaka Khan | Guitar |
| 1988 | Roll with It | Steve Winwood | Guitar |
| 1987 | Don't Disturb This Groove | The System | Guest Artist, Guitar |
| 1987 | Finer Things in Life | Chuck Stanley | Guitar |
| 1987 | Never Never Land | Simon F. | Guitar (Electric) |
| 1987 | Scars of Love | TKA | Guitar |
| 1987 | The Hunger | Michael Bolton | Guitar |
| 1987 | Whitney | Whitney Houston | Guitar |
| 1986 | Come Share My Love | Miki Howard | Guitar |
| 1986 | Back in the High Life | Steve Winwood | Guitar |
| 1986 | One Step Closer | Gavin Christopher | Guitar, Keyboards |
| 1986 | Destiny | Chaka Khan | Guitar, Guitar (Electric) |
| 1986 | Dial My Number | Pauli Carman | Guitar |
| 1986 | Heartbeat | Don Johnson | Bass, Guitar, Guitar (Acoustic) |
| 1986 | Hot Together | The Pointer Sisters | Guitar |
| 1986 | Inside Out | Philip Bailey | Composer |
| 1986 | Never Felt So Good | James Ingram | Guitar |
| 1986 | Souvenirs | Jenny Burton | Guitar |
| 1986 | While the City Sleeps... | George Benson | Guitar |
| 1985 | Chillin' | The Force M.D.'s | Drum Programming, Guitar |
| 1985 | Everybody's Crazy | Michael Bolton | Guitar |
| 1985 | How Could It Be | Eddie Murphy | Guitar |
| 1985 | Pleasure Seekers | The System | Composer, Guitar |
| 1985 | Street Called Desire | René & Angela | Guest Artist, Guitar |
| 1985 | They Said It Couldn't Be Done | Grandmaster Flash | Additional Personnel, Drum Programming, Guitar |
| 1985 | Love Games | Evan Rogers | Guitar |
| 1984 | Chinese Wall | Philip Bailey | Composer |
| 1984 | I Feel for You | Chaka Khan | Guitar |
| 1984 | Let Me Be the One | Angela Bofill | Composer, Drum Programming, Guitar |
| 1984 | Step By Step | Jeff Lorber | Bass, Guitar |
| 1984 | X-Periment | The System | Guitar, Primary Artist |
| 1983 | Doin' It My Way | Howard Johnson | Guitar |
| 1983 | Madonna (album) | Madonna | Guest Artist, Guitar |
