= Nolan Thomas =

American musician

Nolan Thomas (born Marko Kalfa; 24 August 1966 in Jersey City, NJ) is a fashion photographer and former Latin freestyle artist, mostly known for his 1984 single "Yo' Little Brother" which peaked at #57 on the Billboard Hot 100.

Thomas appeared in the music video of "Yo' Little Brother". The original 12-inch single of "Yo' Little Brother" was initially released by Emergency Records. The music video was conceived by Stu Sleppin and Bob Teeman.

A full-length LP was released by Mirage/Atco/Atlantic Records in 1984, which yielded two more singles. In the UK during the mid-1980s "Yo' Little Brother" was aired on Channel 4's The Max Headroom Show. In 1989 he released the single "Once Around The Block", under the name Mark Kalfa.

== Discography ==
Studio albums

Title	Album details
Yo' Little Brother	Released: 1985; Label: Mirage

Singles

Title	Year	Peak chart positions		Album
Title	Year	US	US R&B	Album
"Yo' Little Brother"	1984	57	26	Yo' Little Brother
"One Bad Apple"	1985	105	48	Yo' Little Brother
"Too White"	1985	—	—	Yo' Little Brother
"Once Around the Block"*	1989	—	—	Single
"—" denotes a recording that did not chart or was not released in that territory.
