= Don't Disturb This Groove (album) =

Studio album by the System
- Released: January 14, 1987
- Recorded: 1986
- Genre: Techno; funk; R&B
- Length: 48:23
- Label: Atlantic; 81691
- Producer: David Frank, Mic Murphy

The System chronology
The Pleasure Seekers (1985)	Don't Disturb This Groove (1987)	Rhythm & Romance (1989)

Singles from Don't Disturb This Groove
- 1. "Don't Disturb This Groove" Released: January 1987; 2. "Nighttime Lover" Released: 1987

Don't Disturb This Groove is the fourth studio album recorded by American R&B/Synthpop band the System. Released by Atlantic Records in 1987, the album became a highlight of the System's career, as it was the most commercially successful album, surpassing its hugely successful debut, Sweat. It reached No. 62 on the Billboard 200 and No. 1 on the R&B Albums chart. The album was produced by its band members, David Frank and Mic Murphy.

Successful singles from this album included the band's first (and, to date, only) top 10 hit on the pop charts with the contemporary R&B ballad title track "Don't Disturb This Groove" and urban hit "Nighttime Lover".

Doug E. Fresh was featured on the track "House of Rhythm."

== Critical reception ==
Reviewing for AllMusic, Ron Wynn highlighted the title track as the peak of the System's "techno-funk" music. By contrast, The Village Voice critic Robert Christgau relegated the album to his list of failures below his "Consumer Guide" column.

== Track listing ==
^{All songs written by David Frank & Mic Murphy, except "Come as You Are (Superstar)" written by Frank, Murphy, and Paul Pesco.}

Side 1
No.	Title	Length
1.	"Don't Disturb This Groove"	5:16
2.	"Come as You Are (Superstar)"	5:11
3.	"Save Me"	3:57
4.	"Heart Beat of the City"	4:48
5.	"Groove (instrumental)"	5:16

Side 2
No.	Title	Length
1.	"Nighttime Lover"	5:23
2.	"House of Rhythm"	4:52
3.	"Didn't I Blow Your Mind"	4:22
4.	"Soul Boy"	5:10
5.	"Modern Girl"	4:09

== Personnel ==
- Mic Murphy – producer, electric guitar on "Modern Girl," lead vocals, backing vocals
- David Frank – producer, keyboards, drums
- Audrey Wheeler, Dolette McDonald, Fonzi Thornton, Michelle Cobbs, Phillip Ballou – backing vocals
- Omar Hakim – drums on "Save Me"
- Ira Siegel, Steve Stevens – electric guitar
- Paul Pesco – electric guitar
- Jimmy Maelen – percussion
- Andy Snitzer – saxophone
- Doug E. Fresh – Human Beat Box Rappin' on "House of Rhythm"
- B.J. Nelson – solo vocals on "Don't Disturb this Groove" and "Didn't I Blow Your Mind," backing vocals
- Howard Jones - solo vocals on "Didn't I Blow Your Mind," backing vocals
- New West Horns - horns

== Charts ==
=== Weekly charts ===
Chart (1987)	Peak position
US Billboard 200	62
US Top R&B/Hip-Hop Albums (Billboard)	13

=== Year-end charts ===
Chart (1987)	Position
US Top R&B/Hip-Hop Albums (Billboard)	33
