= Sweat (The System album) =

Studio album by the System
- Released: June 19, 1983
- Recorded: August 1981– April 1983
- Studios: Sorcerer Sound Studios, Soho, N.Y.
- Genres: Post-disco; funk; electro; synth-pop
- Length: 41:33
- Label: Mirage/Atlantic
- Producers: David Frank; Mic Murphy

The System chronology
Sweat (1983)	X-Periment (1984)

Singles from Sweat
- 1. "It's Passion" Released: June 1982; 2. "You Are in My System" Released: January 1983; 3. "Sweat" Released: May 1983; 4. "I Won't Let Go" Released: July 1983

Professional ratings
Review scores
Source	Rating
The Village Voice	A−

Sweat is the 1983 debut album recorded by the American band the System, released in the United States on June 19, 1983, under Mirage Records (a subsidiary label for Atlantic). It was produced by the duo of David Frank and Mic Murphy. The album features two commercially successful songs "It's Passion" and "You Are in My System". The album entered the Billboard 200 and R&B Albums charts in 1983.

== Track listing ==
^{All songs written by Frank & Murphy.}

Side A
No.	Title	Length
1.	"Sweat"	7:13
2.	"You Are in My System"	5:57
3.	"It's Passion"	7:28

Side B
No.	Title	Length
1.	"Stand Up And Cheer"	5:45
2.	"I Won't Let Go"	5:27
3.	"Go For What U Know"	5:37
4.	"Now I Am Electric"	4:06

== Personnel ==
- Mic Murphy - vocals, electric guitars
- David Frank - keyboards, synthesizers, digital sounds

Production

- Arranged and Produced by Mic Murphy and David Frank.
- Recording and mix by Craig Bishop.
- Mastered by "Dr." Dennis King.

== Chart positions ==
Chart (1983)	Peak position
US Billboard 200	94
US R&B Albums	14
