= Don't Disturb This Groove (song) =

Single by The System

from the album Don't Disturb This Groove
- B-side: "Modern Girl"
- Released: January 1987
- Recorded: 1986
- Studio: Intergalactic Recording Studio (New York)
- Genre: Synth-pop; R&B
- Length: 5:20 (full album version); 3:45 (single/video)
- Label: Atlantic
- Songwriters: David Frank; Mic Murphy
- Producer: The System

The System singles chronology
"The Pleasure Seekers" (1985)	"Don't Disturb This Groove" (1987)	"Nighttime Lover" (1987)

"Don't Disturb This Groove" is a song by the synthpop/R&B duo The System, from the 1987 album Don't Disturb This Groove. The song was written by the System's David Frank and Mic Murphy. It was released as the album's first single.

In May 1987, the song reached number 1 on the US Billboard R&B Singles chart, spending one week on top. It was later a hit on the Billboard Hot 100 during the summer of 1987 as well, peaking at number 4 in July.

== Background ==
Instrumentalist David Frank said,

It was a musical track that I did first. I spent the better part of three days working on different ideas and options and I remember wondering whether I was wasting my time. Mic liked it and wrote the lyrics and melody over the track. It needed a link between the verse and chorus so we worked out the “hang a sign up on the door” section. It took a long time to get it right but it was worth it. Our manager and record company didn’t think it should be first single but Mic and I did and we won out on that, thank goodness.

== Track listing ==
7" vinyl (US)

1. "Don't Disturb This Groove" (Edit of Remix) – 3:45
2. "Modern Girl" – 4:40

12" vinyl (US)

1. "Don't Disturb This Groove" (Vocal/Remix) – 5:32
2. "Don't Disturb This Groove" (Dub Version) – 4:25
3. "Don't Disturb This Groove" (Groove Remix) – 5:20

== Charts ==
=== Weekly charts ===
Weekly chart performance for "Don't Disturb This Groove"
Chart (1987)	Peak position
New Zealand (Recorded Music NZ)	35
US Billboard Hot 100	4
US Billboard Adult Contemporary	35
US Billboard Hot R&B/Hip-Hop Songs	1

=== Year-end charts ===
Year-end chart performance for "Don't Disturb This Groove"
Chart (1987)	Position
US Top Pop Singles (Billboard)	57

== Other versions ==
- Tupac sampled the song for his "Lost Souls", a song on the 1997 Gang Related film soundtrack.
- An interpolation of the song is used in Victoria Beckham's hit single "This Groove", which reached the UK Top 3 in 2004.
- The Backstreet Boys covered the song for their 2005 album, Never Gone. It remains unreleased.
- R&B group Silk recorded a cover of the song for its 2006 album, Always and Forever.
- Bronx hip-hop group Cru sampled the song for the track "Pay Attention" for their 1997 debut album Da Dirty 30.
- New York house DJ Chris Malinchak sampled and remixed the song for his 2013 single "So Into You".
- Me'Shell Ndegéocello did a slow version of the song for her 2018 album Ventriloquism.
