= Coming to America =

1988 film directed by John Landis

- Theatrical release poster illustrated by Drew Struzan
- Directed by: John Landis
- Screenplay by: David Sheffield; Barry W. Blaustein
- Story by: Eddie Murphy
- Produced by: George Folsey Jr. Robert D. Wachs
- Starring: Eddie Murphy; Arsenio Hall; James Earl Jones; John Amos; Madge Sinclair; Shari Headley
- Cinematography: Woody Omens
- Edited by: Malcolm Campbell; George Folsey Jr.
- Music by: Nile Rodgers
- Production company: Eddie Murphy Productions
- Distributed by: Paramount Pictures
- Release date: June 29, 1988
- Running time: 117 minutes
- Country: United States
- Language: English
- Budget: $36 million
- Box office: $288.8–350 million

Coming to America is a 1988 American romantic comedy film directed by John Landis, based on a story originally created by Eddie Murphy, written by David Sheffield and Barry W. Blaustein, and starring Murphy (in various roles), Arsenio Hall (also in various roles), James Earl Jones, John Amos, Madge Sinclair and Shari Headley. It tells the story of Akeem Joffer, the crown prince of the fictional African nation of Zamunda who travels to the United States in the hopes of finding a woman he can marry and will love him for who he is, not for his status or for having been trained to please him. The film was released in the United States by Paramount Pictures on June 29, 1988, and received generally positive reviews from critics. It was also a box-office success, grossing an estimated $288.8–$350 million on a $36 million budget.

In 1989, a pilot for a planned spin-off television series was made, although this was never picked up for a series. A sequel to the film—Coming 2 America—was released on March 4, 2021.

== Plot ==
In the wealthy African nation of Zamunda, crown prince Akeem Joffer grows weary of his pampered lifestyle and wishes to do more for himself without servants at his every whim. On his 21st birthday, King Jaffe and Queen Aoleon present him with Imani Izzi, an arranged bride-to-be. Akeem spends a few minutes alone with Imani and, after making her perform ridiculous actions, convinces his father to give him 40 days to visit the outside world before his wedding to Imani commences. Seeking an independent woman who can think for herself and love him for himself and not his social status, Akeem and his best friend and personal aide, Semmi, travel to the New York City borough of Queens and rent a squalid tenement in the neighborhood of Jackson Heights under the guise of being poor foreign students.

Beginning their search for Akeem's bride, Akeem and Semmi are invited by local barber shop owner Clarence to a rally raising money for the neighborhood. During the rally, Akeem encounters Lisa McDowell and finds that shes possesses all the qualities he is looking for in a woman. Upon his insistence, he and Semmi get entry-level jobs working at McDowell's, a McDonald's knockoff restaurant owned by Lisa's widowed father Cleo, who is dodging trademark infringement accusations from McDonalds.

Akeem's attempts to win Lisa's love are complicated by Lisa's lazy and obnoxious boyfriend, Darryl Jenks, whose father owns Soul Glo (a Jheri curl–like hairstyling aid). Akeem agrees to accompany the two of them along with Lisa's sister, Patrice, on a double-date to a basketball game where he is recognized by an immigrant from Zamunda. After stopping an armed robber who has hit McDowell's on multiple occasions, Akeem and Semmi are invited to a soiree at Cleo's home in Jamaica Estates, but Cleo assigns them duties instead of treating them as guests. At the soiree, Darryl announces his engagement to Lisa to their families, which infuriates her as she has not consented to any engagement. She breaks up with Darryl and starts dating Akeem. Meanwhile, Semmi hooks up with Patrice and tells her a half truth: he admits that they actually come from an African kingdom but claims that he, himself, is the wealthy prince and Akeem the servant.

Although Akeem thrives on hard work and learning how commoners live, Semmi is not comfortable with living in such meager conditions. After a dinner date with Lisa is thwarted when Semmi furnishes their apartment with a hot tub and other high end luxuries, Akeem confiscates his money and randomly gives it to a homeless Mortimer and Randolph Duke who, thinking that he is Billy Ray Valentine, thank him from outside a restaurant window for putting them back on their feet again. Semmi, now penniless, wires a telegraph to King Jaffe for more money, prompting Akeem's parents to travel to Queens to find him.

When Akeem discovers that his parents have arrived in New York, he and Lisa go to the McDowell residence to lie low. However, the Zamundan entourage finds him there, and his secret identity is revealed. Cleo, who initially disapproved of a man he thought was too poor, is ecstatic at the prospect of his daughter being with a wealthy prince. Lisa, however, becomes angry and confused that Akeem has lied about his identity. Akeem later explains that he wanted her to love him for who he is, not his status or wealth. Still hurt and angry, Lisa refuses his offer of renouncing the throne to marry her. Despondent, Akeem resigns himself to the arranged marriage with Imani. As they leave, Aoleon reprimands Jaffe for clinging to outdated traditions instead of thinking of their son's happiness.

At the wedding procession, a still-heartbroken Akeem stands at the altar and lifts the veil on his bride. Instead of Imani, however, he sees Lisa in the wedding dress. Cleo comes out and stands at the side of the King's chair. Following the ceremony, Lisa and Akeem ride happily in a carriage to the cheers of Zamundans. Akeem, once again, offers to give up the throne for her happiness, but Lisa instead accepts her new life in Zamunda.

== Cast ==
- Eddie Murphy as:
  - Prince Akeem Joffer, the Crown Prince of Zamunda.
  - Randy Watson, a soul singer with the fictional band Sexual Chocolate who perform at a rally that Akeem and Semmi attend.
  - Saul, an elderly Jewish barbershop customer.
  - Clarence, the owner of the barber shop of Queens.
- Arsenio Hall as:
  - Semmi, Akeem's friend and personal aide.
  - Reverend Brown, a reverend who speaks at a rally that Akeem and Semmi attend.
  - Morris, a barber.
  - Extremely Ugly Girl, an unattractive female clubgoer.
- James Earl Jones as King Jaffe Joffer, Akeem's father and King of Zamunda, to whom Semmi answers.
- John Amos as Cleo McDowell, the proprietor of McDowell's, Akeem's employer, and Lisa's father; constantly dodging trademark-infringement claims by lawyers from McDonald's by arguing his restaurant is different in various insignificant ways.
- Madge Sinclair as Queen Aoleon Joffer, Akeem's mother and the Queen of Zamunda.
- Shari Headley as Lisa McDowell, Cleo's older daughter and Akeem's love interest.
- Clint Smith as Sweets, a barber who works for Clarence.
- Paul Bates as Oha, the Zamundi royal family's longtime royal servant.
- Eriq La Salle as Darryl Jenks, Lisa's boyfriend and the son of Soul Glo's owner whom she eventually breaks up with.
- Frankie Faison as Sr. Townsend, the landlord who manages the apartment building where Akeem and Semmi live.
- Vanessa Bell as Imani Izzi, a woman who is betrothed as Akeem's intended wife.
- Louie Anderson as Maurice, a McDowell's employee. According to Hall, Paramount Pictures insisted on having a white actor in the cast. Paramount Pictures provided a list of three white performers. Murphy and Hall chose Louie Anderson because they knew him and liked him.
- Allison Dean as Patrice McDowell, Cleo's younger daughter and Lisa's sister.
- Sheila Johnson as a lady-in-waiting to King Joffer.
- Jake Steinfeld as a cab driver who takes Akeem and Semmi to Queens.
- Calvin Lockhart as Colonel Izzi, Imani's father
- Samuel L. Jackson as the Hold-Up Man, an armed robber at McDowell's who held it up five times.

The cast also includes: Vondie Curtis-Hall as a basketball game vendor who recognizes Akeem; Garcelle Beauvais, Feather and Stephanie Simon as the royal rose bearers; Victoria Dillard as a royal personal bather; Elaine Kagan as a telegraph lady who wires Semmi's message for more money to King Joffer; as well as the film debuts of Ruben Hudson as a street hustler and Cuba Gooding Jr. as a boy getting a haircut at the time when Akeem and Semmi arrive in Queens.

Don Ameche and Ralph Bellamy reprise their roles as Mortimer and Randolph Duke respectively from John Landis' Murphy-starring comedy film Trading Places (1983) who have become homeless after the events of the film and receive money from Akeem. A segment of the Trading Places score can be heard during their scene.

As previously indicated, Coming to America features Murphy and Hall in several different roles, of different races and genders. Following the success of this film, this became a Murphy staple, as seen in four later films: Vampire in Brooklyn (1995); The Nutty Professor (1996) and its sequel (2000); and Norbit (2007).

== Production ==
Coming to America reunited star Eddie Murphy with director John Landis. The two men had previously worked together on the comedy hit Trading Places. Landis recalled the differences in working with Murphy on the two movies: "The guy on Trading Places was young and full of energy and curious and funny and fresh and great. The guy on Coming to America was the pig of the world... But I still think he's wonderful in the movie." Murphy said:

We had a tussling confrontation… We didn't come to blows. Personalities didn't mesh. ... He directed me in Trading Places when I was just starting out as a kid, but he was still treating me like a kid five years later during Coming to America. And I hired him to direct the movie! I was gonna direct Coming to America myself, but I knew that Landis had just done three fucked-up pictures in a row and that his career was hanging by a thread after the Twilight Zone trial. I figured the guy was nice to me when I did Trading Places, so I'd give him a shot… I was going out of my way to help this guy, and he fucked me over. Now he's got a hit picture on his resumé, a movie that made over $200 million, as opposed to him coming off a couple of fucked-up movies – which is where I'd rather see him be right now.

Despite the experience, Landis and Murphy collaborated again six years later on Beverly Hills Cop III.

South African chorus Ladysmith Black Mambazo sings "Mbube" during the opening sequence (the song also known as "The Lion Sleeps Tonight"). The group has since recorded several different versions of "Mbube"; however, the version heard in Coming to America had not been released on its soundtrack or on CD as of 2006. A promotional song for the film, also titled "Coming to America", was written and performed by The System.

Murphy received a personal salary of $8 million for his work on the film, plus 15% of film rentals. Landis received $600,000, plus 10% of gross receipts. Landis' calling card ("See You Next Wednesday") appears as an "easter egg" within the film, on a science-fiction movie poster in the subway station after Lisa McDowell (Shari Headley) storms off the train.

== Release ==
Paramount cancelled press screenings of the film after initial negative reactions to a press screening in New York City.

=== Box office ===
Released on June 29, 1988, by Paramount Pictures in the United States, it was a commercial box-office success, both domestically and worldwide. The film debuted at number one with $21,404,420 from 2,064 screens, for a five-day total of $28,409,497. The film made $128,152,301 in the United States and ended up with a worldwide total of $288,752,301. It was the highest earning film that year for the studio and the third-highest-grossing film at the United States box office.

It opened a month later in the UK and earned $7,712,622 during its seven-week run. It opened on September 2 in West Germany, where it debuted at number one with $3,715,791 from 297 screens. It ended its run after 13 weeks with $15,743,447. Several contemporary articles stated that the worldwide gross of the movie was $350 million.

=== Reception ===
Coming To America received positive reviews upon release. On the review aggregator website Rotten Tomatoes, 71% of 56 critics' reviews are positive, with an average rating of 6.2/10. The website's consensus reads: "Eddie Murphy was in full control at this point, starkly evident in Coming to America's John Landis' coasting direction." Metacritic, which uses a weighted average, assigned the film a score of 47 out of 100, based on 16 critics, indicating "mixed or average" reviews. Audiences polled by CinemaScore gave the film an average grade of "A" on an A+ to F scale.

Sheila Benson in the Los Angeles Times called it a "hollow and wearying Eddie Murphy fairy tale" and bemoans, "That an Eddie Murphy movie would come to this." Vincent Canby in The New York Times was also critical of the writing, calling it a "possibly funny idea" but suggesting the screenplay had escaped before it was ready. Canby viewed the film as essentially a romantic comedy but said the romantic elements fell flat, and the film instead goes for broad slapstick. Kathleen Carroll of the New York Daily News called the film "an adorably amusing upscale fairy tale, an endearingly romantic comedy which has all the fabulous fake opulence of an old-fashioned Hollywood musical as well as the traditionally sappy happy ending." Siskel & Ebert had mixed opinions on the film. Gene Siskel enjoyed the acting from Murphy and Arsenio Hall but Roger Ebert was disappointed that Murphy did not bring his usual more lively performance and was critical of the unoriginal script. Siskel, in print, reviewed the film more enthusiastically, giving it three and a half stars out of four, and describing it as "a sweet, oft-told story", adding that "Murphy and Hall add a number of very sharp supporting roles hidden by makeup to add spice to the general level of gentleness." However, in 2016, in an interview for the Los Angeles Times, Eddie Murphy made a comment regarding the negative reviews of his work, saying: "Oh, they have no effect on me at all. I haven’t read a review in, easily, 20, 25 years. I used to. I remember when Coming to America came out, Siskel and Ebert gave it two thumbs way down, saying it sucked. Then 10, 15 years later, I remember seeing them do a retrospective and they were both, “The classic Coming to America blah blah blah.’ The shelf life of movies changes over the years."

=== Awards ===
At the 61st Academy Awards, the film was nominated for Best Costume Design for Deborah Nadoolman Landis and Best Makeup for Rick Baker, who designed the makeup effects for both Murphy's and Hall's multiple supporting characters.

The film won the NAACP Image Award for Outstanding Motion Picture and Arsenio Hall won the NAACP Image Award for Outstanding Supporting Actor in a Motion Picture.

=== Lawsuit ===
The film was the subject of the Buchwald v. Paramount civil suit, which the humorist Art Buchwald filed in 1990 against the film's producers on the grounds that the film's idea was stolen from his 1982 script treatment about a rich, despotic African potentate who comes to America for a state visit. Paramount had optioned the treatment from Buchwald and John Landis was attached as director and Eddie Murphy as the lead, but after two years of development hell, Paramount abandoned the project in March 1985. In 1987, Paramount began working on Coming to America based on a story by Eddie Murphy. Buchwald won the breach of contract action and the court ordered monetary damages. The parties later settled the case out of court before an appeal could go to trial.

In August 2022, Paramount filed a lawsuit against JMC Pop Ups LLC for creating a temporary version of McDowell's, the fictional fast food restaurant similar to McDonald's, via the Copyright Claims Board, a tribunal created in 2020 to deal with such matters. The pop up restaurant had operated in Springfield, Virginia and Cherry Hill, New Jersey in 2022, prior to the suit. McDowell's was featured in both the original movie and its sequel.

== Home media ==
Coming to America was released on DVD on June 3, 2008. The Film was released on Blu-Ray on June 3, 2008, and re-released on Blu-Ray on January 1, 2013, and on June 12, 2018. Coming To America was released on 4K Blu-Ray on December 1, 2020.

== Soundtrack ==
Coming to America: Original Motion Picture Soundtrack

Soundtrack album by Various artists
- Released: July 1988
- Genre: Pop
- Length: 40:16
- Label: Atco Records

Singles from Coming to America
- 1. "Coming to America"; 2. "Come into My Life"; 3. "That's the Way It Is"; 4. "Better Late Than Never"

The soundtrack to the film was released on LP, cassette and CD. The songs "Coming to America" by The System, "Better Late Than Never" by The Cover Girls and "Come into My Life" by Laura Branigan and Joe Esposito were released as singles from the album. "That's The Way It Is" by Mel and Kim had been released as a single in the UK, before the film's release, in February 1988 and became a top ten hit on the UK singles chart. It was released as a single in the US at the time of the film's release.

Side A

1. "Coming to America" – The System (3:49)
2. "Better Late Than Never" – The Cover Girls (4:02)
3. "All Dressed Up (Ready to Hit the Town)" – Chico DeBarge (4:50)
4. "I Like It Like That" – Michael Rodgers (4:01)
5. "That's the Way It Is" – Mel and Kim (3:25)

Side B

1. "Addicted to You" – LeVert (3:54)
2. "Comin' Correct" – J.J. Fad (3:56)
3. "Livin' the Good Life" – Sister Sledge (3:46)
4. "Transparent" – Nona Hendryx (3:50)
5. "Come into My Life" – Laura Branigan and Joe Esposito (4:39)

=== Soul Glo jingle ===
The jingle for the commercial for the fictional product Soul Glo was composed by Nile Rodgers, who has suggested it is his "proudest moment". Vocals were provided by Christopher Max.

== Legacy ==
=== Television pilot ===
A television pilot of a weekly sitcom version of the film was produced for CBS, following the film's success, starring Tommy Davidson as Prince Tariq and Paul Bates reprising his role as Oha. The pilot went unsold but was televised on July 4, 1989, as part of the CBS Summer Playhouse pilot anthology series.

=== Remakes ===
A Tamil film, My Dear Marthandan, was produced based on the plot of Coming to America. A Hong Kong film, The Fun, the Luck & the Tycoon, also has the same plot.

=== Influences in music ===
The melody heard in the bathroom scene, where Prince Akeem (Murphy) is being washed by female servants, was sampled in Snoop Dogg's 2006 song "That's That" featuring R. Kelly from his album The Blue Carpet Treatment; a remix of the song featuring American rapper Nas includes the royal bather (Victoria Dillard)'s voice saying "the royal penis is clean, Your Highness", a line taken from the same scene. The supergroup The Randy Watson Experience is named after the character Randy Watson (Murphy).

=== Cultural impact ===
The movie has been described as having a "cult following" years after its release, despite negative press, with one of the highest-grossing box office of the year it was released, as well as one of the highest-grossing films featuring a predominantly African-American cast.

== Sequel ==
In early 2017, an announcement was publicized which addressed the impending production of a sequel to the film. Kevin Misher was named as producer, and David Sheffield and Barry W. Blaustein, the original screenwriters, were also attached to the project. However, the participation of lead actors Eddie Murphy and Arsenio Hall was left undefined.

On January 11, 2019, it was announced that the sequel was moving forward with Murphy reprising his role and Craig Brewer as director (having previously worked with Murphy on the Netflix film Dolemite Is My Name). Arsenio Hall, Shari Headley, John Amos, Paul Bates and James Earl Jones returned for the sequel as well. Wesley Snipes signed on for a role in the film. It was reported that Leslie Jones and American rapper Rick Ross were joining the cast in undisclosed roles.

The film was scheduled to be theatrically released on December 18, 2020, but due to the COVID-19 pandemic, Amazon Studios bought the distribution rights and released it digitally on Amazon Prime Video on March 4, 2021.
