= David Frank (musician) =

American musician (born 1957)

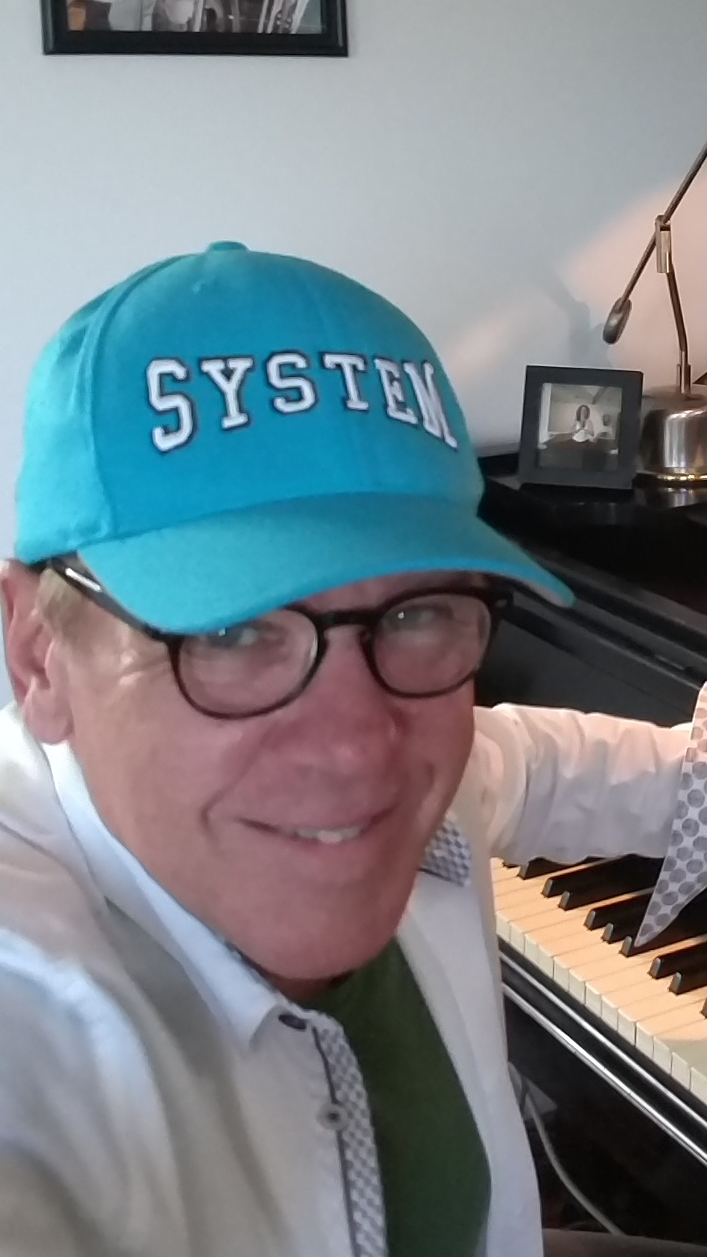
- Frank in 2020

Background information
- Born: David Martin Frank; November 13, 1957 (age 68)
- Occupations: Synthesist; pianist; music producer; programmer; songwriter
- Years active: Early 1980s–present
- Website: davidfrankmusic.com

David Martin Frank (born November 13, 1957) is an American music producer, composer, classically trained pianist, and founding member of the 1980s R&B group the System. Yamaha Music calls him "the founding father of electronic R&B."

== Early life and education ==
David Martin Frank was born on November 13, 1957, and grew up in the Boston suburb of Weston, Massachusetts and played classical piano at a recital level from a young age. By fifth grade he had won his first composing competition. In high school, Frank played in rock bands hired for dances and competed, often successfully, in talent shows and battle of the band contests. He attributes his fluency with soul and R&B music to an early encounter he had with a singer he met at one such contest. The singer was later incorporated as a member of his band. His studies continued throughout his youth as a student at the New England Conservatory and later at the Berklee College of Music. While at New England Conservatory, an instructor brought in a copy of Wendy Carlos' groundbreaking album Switched-On Bach. Frank had already been experimenting with getting electric guitar sounds out of his Farfisa organ, and was inspired by this encounter to continue pursuing electronic musical directions.

== Career ==
Upon graduating from Berklee, David began playing in bands around the Greater Boston metropolitan area. The bass player in one of such bands exposed him to an ARP Odyssey synthesizer for David to play. The new sounds intrigued him so much that, borrowing the money from his dad, he bought one for himself the next day. Meanwhile, Frank worked as a wedding musician.

=== The System ===
In 1981, while he was working in New York City, Frank was called in to do a session for a local studio owner who suggested that he use the time to create a dance song. Frank initially wanted to use his upstairs neighbor and bandmate, a pre-stardom Madonna. Instead he called up another singer, Mic Murphy, whom he knew while working as a tour keyboardist with Kleeer. A marathon recording session resulted in "In Times of Passion". The next day, the System was signed to Mirage Records which was a subsidiary of Atlantic Records. "In Times of Passion" became both a radio and club hit in New York. The interest sparked enough interest for Mirage to give David and Mic an advance for an album. The album, Sweat, launched club hits "Sweat," "I Won't Let Go" and the iconic "You Are In My System". Robert Palmer's cover of the song became a mainstream rock hit. As keyboard synthesist and arranger David helped out on hit recordings that defined the sound of that era with Chaka Khan's "I Feel For You", Phil Collins' "Sussudio," and Mtume's "Juicy Fruit." He worked with Arif Mardin on three songs on Scritti Politti's album Cupid & Psyche 85 and with Russ Titelman on Steve Winwood's album Back in the High Life arranging the live horns on the album as well as the synth horns on the #1 hit "Higher Love". And lastly he was recognized for the System's #1 hit "Don't Disturb This Groove" in which Frank firmly established his prowess as a bass-groove synthesizer innovator and master. Frank and Murphy produced tracks on albums for artists including Ashford and Simpson, Phillip Bailey of Earth Wind and Fire, Jeff Lorber, Angela Bofill and Nona Hendryx.

=== Move to Los Angeles ===
In the early 1990s after the System was disbanded, Frank moved to Los Angeles where he opened his own recording studio called Canyon Reverb. One of the first artists he worked with in LA was RCA recording artist Omar on his albums For Pleasure and This is Not a Love Song. Through his publisher, Frank met songwriter Steve Kipner, and through friends he met New Zealand songwriter Pam Sheyne. Together they went on to generate several hit songs (Dream's "He Loves U Not", "This Is Me", 98 Degrees' "The Hardest Thing", O-Town's "These Are the Days" as well as Christina Aguilera's "Genie in a Bottle"). "Genie" won him an Ivor Novello Award for international hit of the year.

Currently, Frank is signed as a songwriter to Universal Music Publishing Group and works with songwriters in Los Angeles, New York, and London. Recently, he worked on French pop artist Christine and the Queens' album Chris doing keyboards, piano synth bass and synthesizer. He also arranged horns on Michael McDonald's most recent album Wide Open and was credited on "Crying in the Club" by Camila Cabello, which samples "Genie in a Bottle." and as songwriter on "Muddy Feet" by Miley Cyrus on her 2023 album Endless Summer Vacation.

== Discography ==
Frank is a credited contributor as either a producer, songwriter, or musician on the following songs or albums:

- 98 Degrees - 98° & Rising
- Acoustic Moods (Various Artists)
- American Juniors - American Juniors
- Angela Bofill - Let Me Be the One
- Attitude - Pump the Nation
- Ashford and Simpson - Love or Physical
- Aztec Camera - Love
- Bardo Pond - Amanita
- Beverly Hills Cop film soundtrack
- Best of Acid Jazz [Global]
- Billy Idol - Whiplash Smile
- Billy Squier - Enough Is Enough
- Brie Larson - Finally Out of P.E.
- Carole Davis - I'm No Angel
- Chaka Khan - ck
- Chaka Khan - I Feel for You
- Christina Aguilera - Christina Aguilera
- Coming to America film soundtrack
- Divas of Dance Vol. 1
- Destiny's Child - Destiny's Child
- Dupont - New World Beat
- Dream - It Was All a Dream
- Eden's Crush - Popstars
- Eric Clapton - Rush
- Eternal - Power of a Woman
- Everybody Dance: 3 CD Limited Edition
- Dionne Farris - Wild Seed – Wild Flower
- Gang Related soundtrack
- Katey Sagal - Well...
- James Morrison - Undiscovered
- Junior - Best of Junior
- Jeff Lorber - Step by Step
- Jeff Lorber - West Side Stories
- Jordin Sparks - Jordin Sparks
- Kleeer - The Very Best of Kleeer
- Laura Nyro - Walk the Dog and Light the Light
- Liberty X - Being Somebody
- Linear - Caught in the Middle
- "Lost Souls" - by 2Pac featuring Outlawz samples "Don't Disturb This Groove"
- Love Shouldn't Hurt (Various Artists)
- Marked for Death film soundtrack
- Masters at Work - The Album
- Michael McDonald - Blink of an Eye
- Mtume - Juicy Fruit
- Mtume - You, Me and He
- Nikki Cleary - Nikki Cleary
- Nine
- Nona Hendryx - Female Trouble
- Ofra Haza - "Ya Ba Ye" (Remix)
- Omar - For Pleasure
- Omar - This Is Not a Love Song
- O-Town - O-Town
- Pauli Carman - Dial My Number
- Paul Lekakis - Tattoo It
- Phoebe Snow - Something Real
- Phil Collins - No Jacket Required
- The Pussycat Dolls - Doll Domination
- Rebbie Jackson - Yours Faithfully
- Robert Palmer - Pride
- Rod Stewart - Human
- Ronan Keating - Turn It On
- S Club 7 - Don't Stop Movin'
- Scritti Politti - Cupid & Psyche 85
- Sheena Easton - "My Cherie" (single)
- Sheena Easton - What Comes Naturally
- Steve Winwood - Back in the High Life
- Steve Winwood - The Finer Things
- The System - Don't Disturb This Groove
- The System - Sweat
- The System - X-Periment
- The System - The Pleasure Seekers
- The System - Rhythm & Romance
- Takeshi Itoh - T.K.
- Toya - Toya
- Vanessa Williams - The Comfort Zone
- Vitamin C - More
- Westlife - Westlife
- Wild Orchid - Wild Orchid
- Wayne Watson - Field of Souls
- YM Hot Tracks Vol. 1
