= Mirage Records =

American record label

- Parent company: Unidisc
- Founded: 1980
- Founder: Jerry L. Greenberg; Bob Greenberg
- Genre: Various
- Country of origin: United States
- Official website: miragemusicentertainment.com

Mirage Records is the name of multiple music business entities, the most notable of which was an American record label founded by Jerry and Bob Greenberg in 1980. The label, also known as Mirage Music or simply Mirage, was distributed first by Atlantic Records and later by Atco Records. Artists who released records on this label included Godley & Creme, Rose Tattoo, Phoebe Snow, and Whitesnake. The first record on this imprint was released in 1980. The label's catalogue is now controlled by Unidisc.

== Mirage Records artists ==
The following is a list of artists who have recorded for Mirage Records.

- Brenda K. Starr
- Godley & Creme
- Kano
- Jean Knight
- T.S. Monk
- Gary Moore
- Chic
- Rage
- Rose Tattoo
- Shannon
- G.E. Smith
- Robin Gibb
- Mark Shreeve
- Phoebe Snow
- Southside Johnny & the Jukes
- The System
- Toni Tennille
- Nolan Thomas
- Whitesnake
- Xavion
