= The System (band) =

American synth-pop duo (1981–1989)

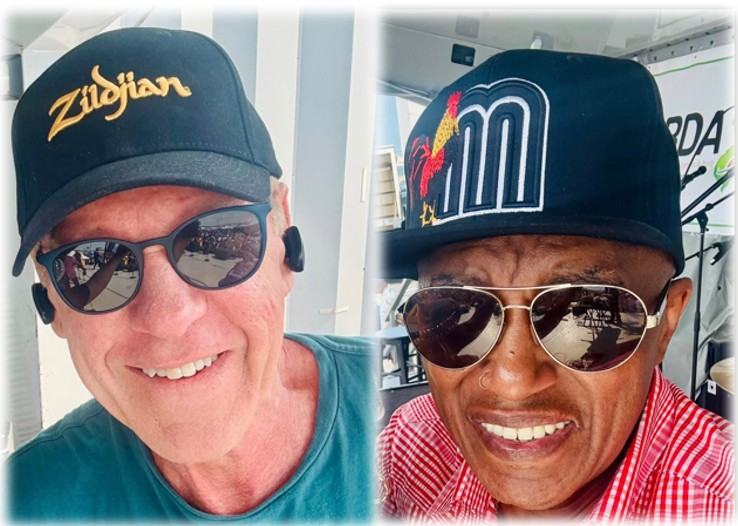
- Frank and Murphy in Atlantic City, 2025

Background information
- Origin: New York, New York, U.S.
- Genres: Post-disco; R&B; boogie; new wave; synth-pop; dance; electro
- Years active: 1981–1989
- Labels: Atlantic; Mirage
- Past members: Mic Murphy; David Frank

The System was an American synth-pop duo that debuted in the 1980s, composed of vocalist-guitarist Mic Murphy and seasoned session keyboardist David Frank. The band was founded in 1981 in New York and backed up by Paul Pesco on electric guitar and Kris Khellow on keyboards and synthesizers. The group have described their music as being "emotio-electro" because of its hi-tech, synthesizer-driven sound, married with passionate vocals and sensitive lyrics.

== Origins ==
David Frank and Mic Murphy met in the early 1980s while working for the soul-funk band Kleeer. Frank had gotten a break when Atlantic Records enlisted him as Kleeer's tour keyboardist. The band's road manager was Mic Murphy, and although Murphy was obviously aware of Frank's skills, Frank was unaware Murphy could sing. Later in New York City, David Frank was working on a session that evolved into a track called "It's Passion," which was to feature a pre-stardom Madonna on vocals. However, due to creative differences, Madonna bowed out. Frank then remembered Murphy and invited him to work on it. The results were so impressive that Mirage/Atlantic Records offered Murphy and Frank a recording deal of their own. Murphy came up with the band's name, and within weeks "It's Passion" was receiving massive radio airplay in New York. "It's Passion" became both a radio and club hit in New York. The interest sparked enough interest for Mirage to give David and Mic an advance for an album.

== Career ==
The resulting 1983 album Sweat launched the club hits "Sweat," "I Won't Let Go" and "You Are in My System," which became a number-ten R&B smash. Robert Palmer's cover of the song became a mainstream rock hit. In 1983, Murphy and Frank also wrote and produced "Pump the Nation," a one-off album for a project called Attitude. Attitude featured Khris Kellow, who worked on many of the System's later albums and appears as a member of the band in the movie Beat Street during the song "Baptize the Beat." It was also around this time that budding session guitarist Paul Pesco began joining the group in the studio and on live tours.

In 1984, the group released its second album, X-Periment. Frank's expertise in recording studio technology gave the material a sound that many felt was ahead of its time. Indeed, the heavy use of synths and electric percussion was a step beyond the dance-influenced flavor of the previous album, and Murphy's soulful vocals gave the songs a definite R&B flavor. Besides the upbeat electronics-laden tracks, the album also introduced a more mature and pop-friendly quality, evident in tracks such as "Promises Can Break," "I Wanna Make You Feel Good," and "I Can't Take Losing You." The System also appeared in the 1984 breakdancing film Beat Street and its soundtrack, performing the song "Baptize the Beat." On their 1985 album, The Pleasure Seekers, significant tracks include "It Takes 2", "Love Won't Wait for Lovin'", and "This is for You". In 1985, David Frank and Mic Murphy teamed up with Jeff Lorber to collaborate on Lorber's album Step by Step.

The System's greatest success came in 1987 with the release of its #1 single "Don't Disturb This Groove," from the album of the same name. The duo hired Steven Machat and Rick Smith to be its managers. Machat and Smith took control of the promotion and marketing of the duo on behalf of Atlantic and helped the duo achieve its biggest US Pop hit. The single reached No. 1 on the Billboard R&B chart and No. 4 on the Hot 100. The follow-up single, "Nighttime Lover", was also a top 10 R&B hit, peaking at No. 3. In 1989, The System released its fifth and final album, Rhythm & Romance.

=== Soundtrack work and other contributions ===
Their version of the Marc Benno song "Rock 'n Roll Me Again" became famous in the 1984 action comedy Beverly Hills Cop with Eddie Murphy. The soundtrack album would go on to win a Grammy. The group would also reach No. 23 on Billboard's R&B chart with the title track from the 1988 Eddie Murphy film Coming to America. All of this success occurred while the group was contributing its talents to projects such as the Scritti Politti album Cupid & Psyche 85; Phil Collins' "Sussudio"; Chaka Khan's "I Feel for You" and "This is My Night"; and Mtume's "Juicy Fruit", among many others.

=== Hiatus ===
Murphy and Frank parted ways professionally after releasing their final album Rhythm & Romance in 1989. Murphy recorded the solo album Touch and charted in 1991 with a single from that project. Frank found more recent success as a songwriter and producer, most notably for hit singles such as Christina Aguilera's "Genie in a Bottle" in 1999, and teen girl-group Dream's "He Loves U Not" in 2000.

=== Reunions ===
In 2000, the duo reunited for the album ESP, which featured a reworked version of "You Are in My System," originally on 1983's Sweat. In late 2009, the group released the album Unreleased Unleashed, a collection of prototype and unreleased songs recorded at various points over the span of The System's recording career. Two of these tracks, "Hole in My Love" and "You Are in My System (Redux)," were taken directly from the ESP album. Also, the track "Sonic Fire" was previously released as the B-side for some 7-inch singles of "I Wanna Make You Feel Good" in 1984.

2013 marked another reunion of The System, with a new 12-inch remix collection of the recording for the Breakdance film Beat Street, "Baptize the Beat". The 12-inch limited-edition vinyl was released on Electroavenue Records in the UK and features remixes by Funkmaster Ozone, Fleck, Lloyd da Zoid / Diplomat & Sace. In September 2012, the group unveiled two new singles, "Motha" and "The Toast", which would be featured on their then-forthcoming album, System Overload. The songs were mixed by Unique Recording Studio mixer Chris Lord-Alge, whose association with the band dates to 1983. The sessions took place in Topanga Canyon's Canyon Reverb, the Village Recorders, and NYC Spanish Harlem SPAHA Studios and with contributions from longtime collaborator guitarist/unofficial bandmember Paul Pesco, drummer Steven Wolf, and sound architect Tim K. System Overload was released in 2013 on the band's own label, Science Lab Records.

== Band members ==
- Mic Murphy – vocals, guitar
- David Frank – keyboards, synthesizers

=== Past members ===
- Kris Khellow – keyboards, synthesizers
- Paul Pesco – guitar

== Discography ==
=== Studio albums ===
- Sweat (1983)
- X-Periment (1984)
- The Pleasure Seekers (1985)
- Don't Disturb This Groove (1987)
- Rhythm & Romance (1989)
- ESP (2000)
- System Overload (2013)

=== Compilation albums ===
- Unreleased Unleashed (2009)
