= Mic Murphy =

American musician (born 1958)

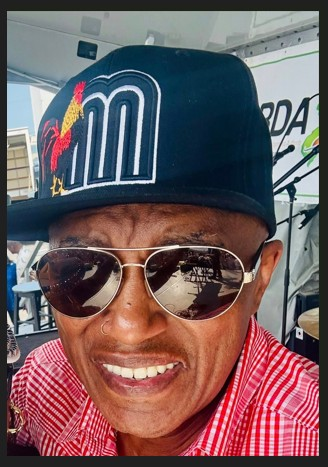
- Mic at Gardner's Basin in Atlantic City, 2025

Background information
- Born: Michael Austin Murphy; 9 January 1958 (age 68); Raleigh, North Carolina
- Genres: R&B; synth-funk; electro
- Occupations: Singer; producer; songwriter; guitarist
- Instruments: Vocals; guitar
- Years active: Early 1980s–present

Michael Austin "Mic" Murphy (born January 9, 1958) is an American musician, lead singer of the successful 1980s synth R&B duo the System. He is well known for singing the group's biggest hit, "Don't Disturb This Groove," a 1987 US #4 Pop and #1 R&B hit.

== Career ==
Murphy was born in Raleigh, North Carolina, but he moved to Queens, New York at an early age. As a young musician, he was an early advocate of MIDI music technology. Murphy was road manager for the band Kleeer in the early 1980s, and through them he met his future System bandmate, David Frank. The two joined forces and made an immediate impact with their first album as the System. The single "You Are in My System," helped to usher in a new era of electronically based pop music. In 1987, the group scored its major breakthrough with "Don't Disturb this Groove."

== Solo career and beyond ==
After The System was disbanded in 1989, Murphy briefly pursued a solo career. In 1991, he released his debut solo album, Touch, which featured a minor R&B hit, "Fit to Be Tied." His 2004 remix with writing partner Tim K (of Lucy Woodward's "Blindsided"), reached #1 on the Billboard Club Play Chart. He was a featured vocalist on Home & Garden's 2007 album Domesticated, which was released on Om Records and produced by Tim K and Timothy Shumaker.

== Discography ==
=== Solo albums ===
- Touch (1991)

=== with The System ===
- Sweat (1983)
- X-Periment (1984)
- The Pleasure Seekers (1985)
- Don't Disturb This Groove (1987)
- Rhythm & Romance (1989)
- ESP (2000)
- System Overload (2013)
