= Love Session =

Studio album by Silk
- Released: June 12, 2001
- Recorded: Audio Dallas Studios (Garland); Access Music Studios (Marietta); Jordan's Room Studios (Atlanta); 2000 Watts Studios (New York City)
- Length: 62:34
- Label: Elektra
- Producer: Darrell "Delite" Allamby; Gary Jenkins; Silk Music Group Inc.

Silk chronology
Tonight (1999)	Love Session (2001)	Silktime (2003)

Singles from Love Session
- 1. "We're Callin U" Released: 2001; 2. "Ebony Eyes" Released: 2001

Love Session is the fourth studio album by American R&B group Silk. It was released by Elektra Records on June 12, 2001 in the United States. Chiefly produced by Darrell "Delite" Allamby and Silk, it reached number 20 on the US Billboard 200 and number two on the Top R&B/Hip-Hop Albums chart. The album was the last recording the band released under a major label and also marked their last project to be recorded as a quintet after the departure of member Gary Jenkins in 2002.

== Promotion ==
The first single released from the album was "We're Callin' You". The music video was directed by Sylvain White. Love Session also contains a popular cover of the single "Ebony Eyes," originally recorded by Rick James as a duet with Smokey Robinson from his 1983 album Cold Blooded. Silk's version was released as the album's second single in 2001.

== Critical reception ==
Professional ratings
Review scores
Source	Rating
AllMusic	2.5/5 stars
NME	3/5 stars

AllMusic editor Kingsley Marshall remarked that "although the cover of the Rick James and Smokey Robinson duet "Ebony Eyes" does the original little justice, the rest of the album is as slick as can be, and if you're still in need of freaking close to ten years on from "Freak Me" then you won't go far wrong with this." NME found that "lyrical cliches undermine the power of this fourth missive from Silk."

== Track listing ==
Love Session track listing
No.	Title	Writer(s)	Producer(s)	Length
1.	"Welcome 2 the Love Session" (Interlude)	Antoinette Roberson; Darrell "Delite" Allamby; Gary "Lil' G" Jenkins	Allamby; Jenkins	2:37
2.	"We're Callin' You"	Allamby; Lincoln Browder; Jenkins; Jimmy Gates, Jr.	Allamby; Silk Music Group Inc.	7:28
3.	"Love Session"	Allamby; Browder; Roberson; Kenny Whitehead	Allamby	5:16
4.	"Nursery Rhymes" (Intro)	–	Allamby	0:46
5.	"Nursery Rhymes"	Allamby; Browder	Allamby	5:08
6.	"Ebony Eyes"	Rick James	Allamby	6:02
7.	"Treated Like a Lady"	Johnathen Rasboro; Allamby; Roberson	Allamby	4:27
8.	"Ahh"	Rasboro; Jenkins; Gates	Silk Music Group Inc.	3:48
9.	"I Didn't Mean to"	Allamby; Browder; Timothy Cameron; Rasboro; Jenkins	Allamby	6:57
10.	"Don't Go" (featuring Tamar Braxton)	Jenkins; Allamby; Browder; Marcus Devine	Allamby; Silk Music Group Inc.	6:55
11.	"I'm Sorry"	Jenkins; Roberson	Allamby; Jenkins; Silk Music Group Inc.	7:14
12.	"Return Part 2" (Interlude)	Gary Glenn	Silk Music Group Inc.; Jordan's World Entertainment^{[a]}	1:30
13.	"Vibrate"	Jenkins; Rasboro; Cameron; Glenn	Silk Music Group Inc.	4:26

Notes

- ^a signifies a co-producer

== Charts ==
=== Weekly charts ===
Weekly chart performance for Love Session
Chart (2001)	Peak position
US Billboard 200	20
US Top R&B/Hip-Hop Albums (Billboard)	2

=== Year-end charts ===
Year-end chart performance for Love Session
Chart (2001)	Position
US Top R&B/Hip-Hop Albums (Billboard)	82

== Release history ==
Love Session release history
Region	Date	Format	Label	Ref(s)
United States	June 12, 2001	CD; vinyl	Elektra	
