= Tonight (Silk album) =

Studio album by Silk
- Released: March 23, 1999
- Recorded: D.A.R.P. Studios; The Hop House; Tree Sound (Atlanta, Georgia); New England Powerstation (Waterford, Connecticut); Quad Recording Studios (New York City, New York); Powerhouse Studios (Newark, New Jersey)
- Length: 74:32
- Label: Elektra
- Producer: Darrell "Delite" Allamby; Gary Jenkins; Steve "Million Dollar Man" Morales; Donald Parks; Maurice Wilcher

Silk chronology
Silk (1995)	Tonight (1999)	Love Session (2001)

Singles from Tonight
- 1. "If You (Lovin' Me)" Released: 1999; 2. "Meeting In My Bedroom" Released: 1999; 3. "Let's Make Love" Released: 1999

Tonight is the third studio album by American R&B group Silk, released on March 23, 1999 on Elektra Entertainment. It was their first album in four years and the reason for the break was due to the group wanting to be more involved in the creative process. Another reason for the hiatus was due to the lackluster performance of their previous album Silk (1995), which caused the group to seek new management after dealing with financial and legal issues. After severing ties with their former managers, they were managed by Sonja Norwood, mother of singer/actress Brandy. They were soon given the green light to record a new album by Elektra's then-president Sylvia Rhone, who let them take their time to record the album until they had the right songs.

Most of the production duties were split between group member Gary Jenkins and producer Darrell "Delite" Allamby. The latter was brought in due to his previous work with Gerald Levert, Busta Rhymes and LSG. Additional production was provided by Maurice Wilcher, Steve "Million Dollar Man" Morales, and Donald Parks. Tonight peaked at number 21 on the US Billboard 200 and number eight on the Top R&B/Hip-Hop Albums chart. The album spawned the hit single "If You", which peaked at number 13 on the US Billboard Hot 100, becoming their biggest hit since "Freak Me" (1993) and follow-up "Meeting In My Bedroom". Tonight proved to be their second most successful album, right behind their 1992 debut Lose Control. The album was certified platinum by the Recording Industry Association of America (RIAA) in 1999.

== Critical reception ==
Professional ratings
Review scores
Source	Rating
AllMusic	3/5 stars
Entertainment Weekly	B−
USA Today	2.5/4 stars

AllMusic editor Stephen Thomas Erlewine found Tonight "a little predictable. If you're at all familiar with the previous two records, you know what to expect lyrically and musically from every track on the record, and chances are, you won't be too disappointed by this slightly over-produced, ballad-heavy set. The uninitiated may find the constant sex talk a little ridiculous and monotonous, but they'll likely groove on Darrell "Delite" Allamby's production, which updates classic '70s soul and funk. It can be a little glossy and glib, as well as a little lightweight in the songwriting department, but that Allamby production makes Tonight fairly effective romantic mood music – even with Silk's vocal histrionics." Entertainment Weekly' Dimiti Ehrlich foiund that "Silk's five-part harmonies are impressive, and their music exudes bright-eyed enthusiasm. But there isn't a shred of originality in their lyrics, and their tendency toward the pop side of R&B makes them sound more like Boyz II Men than boyz from the hood." USA Today critic Steve Jones found thath "Silk is skilled at setting things off. There's quite a bit of soul wrapped up in this smooth musical fabric."

== Commercial performance ==
Tonight opened and peaked at number 21 on the US Billboard 200. It also reached number eight on Billboard's Top R&B/Hip-Hop Albums chart, becoming Silk's third consecutive album to reached the top ten. On June 4, 1999, the album was certified gold by the Recording Industry Association of America (RIAA). It reached platinum status on November 19, 1999, marking shipments of 1.0 million units.

== Track listing ==
Tonight track listing
No.	Title	Writer(s)	Producer(s)	Length
1.	"The Return" (Interlude)	Gary Glenn; Gary Jenkins	Jenkins	2:35
2.	"Tonight"	Antoinette Roberson; Darrell "Delite" Allamby; Lincoln Browder	Allamby	3:45
3.	"Let's Make Love"	Roberson; Allamby; Browder	Allamby	4:41
4.	"If You"	Kenneth "Kenny Flav" Dickerson; Roberson; Allamby; Browder	Allamby	5:37
5.	"Meeting in My Bedroom"	Allamby; Browder	Allamby	5:06
6.	"Satisfied"	Jenkins	Jenkins; Reginald "Wizard" Jones^{[a]}	2:17
7.	"Baby Check Your Friend"	Steven Morales; Raymond Basora; David Siegel	Allamby; Morales	5:01
8.	"I Wonder"	Jenkins; Rasboro; Mobley; Ben "Smooth" Howe	Silk; Howe^{[a]}	4:30
9.	"Sexcellent"	Allamby; Browder	Allamby	3:51
10.	"Love You Down"	Maurice Wilcher; Rasboro; Jenkins; Glenn; Jimmy Gates, Jr.; Timothy Cameron; Allamby	Silk; Wilcher	4:13
11.	"Superstar"	Jenkins; Rasboro; Cameron; Jim Seals; Dash Crofts	Jenkins	4:39
12.	"Playa Road"	Jenkins; Rasboro; Cameron	Jenkins	5:12
13.	"Please Don't Go"	Allamby; Gordon Chambers	Allamby	5:06
14.	"Back In My Arms"	Wilcher; Valvin Roane II	Wilcher	4:11
15.	"Turn-U-Out"	Jenkins; John Howcott; Donald Parks	Parks; Jenkins	4:50
16.	"If You" (2000 Watts Remix)	Dickerson; Roberson; Allamby; Browder	Allamby; Dickerson^{[b]}	4:11
17.	"The Vaughn Harper Interview"		Allamby; Silk	4:40

Notes

- ^a signifies a co-producer
- ^b signifies an additional producer

== Personnel ==
Credits adapted from the liner notes of Tonight.

Performers and musicians

- Darrell "Delite" Allamby – background vocals, keyboards, programming
- Anthony "A.D." Donelson – guitar
- Kenneth "Kenny Flav" Dickerson – keyboards, programming
- Jerry Flowers – drum programming
- Ben "Smooth" Howe – keyboards, programming
- Gary Jenkins – guitar, keyboards, programming
- Avery Johnson – drum programming
- Link – background vocals
- Terrence T. Nelson – drum programming
- Ninja – guitar
- Paul Pesco – guitar
- Zack Scott – drums
- Silk – background vocals
- Maurice Wilcher – keyboards, programming

Technical

- Darrell "Delite" Allamby – executive producer, engineer
- Alli – art direction and design
- Kwaku Alston – photography
- Ben Arrindell – engineer
- Chris Diaz – recording engineer
- Kenneth "Kenny Flav" Dickerson – engineer
- Paul Fleming – recording engineer
- John Grimes – recording engineer
- Shawn Grove – recording engineer
- Bryan Kinkead – recording engineer
- Paul Logus – mixing engineer
- Rico Lumpkins – engineer
- Vernon Mungo – engineer
- Terrence T. Nelson – recording engineer
- Herb Powers – mastering engineer
- Silk – executive producer
- Brian Smith – recording engineer
- Jason Stokes – recording engineer
- Darryl Williams – executive producer
- Jimmy Zupano – recording engineer

== Charts ==
=== Weekly charts ===
Weekly chart performance for Tonight
Chart (1999)	Peak position
US Billboard 200	21
US Top R&B/Hip-Hop Albums (Billboard)	8

=== Year-end charts ===
Year-end chart performance for Tonight
Chart (1999)	Position
US Top R&B/Hip-Hop Albums (Billboard)	33

== Certifications ==
Certifications for Tonight
Region	Certification	Certified units/sales
United States (RIAA)	Platinum	1,000,000^{^}
^{^} Shipments figures based on certification alone.

== Release history ==
Tonight release history
Region	Date	Format	Label	Ref(s)
United States	March 23, 1999	CD; cassette	Elektra	
