= List of Hot R&B Singles number ones of 1993 =

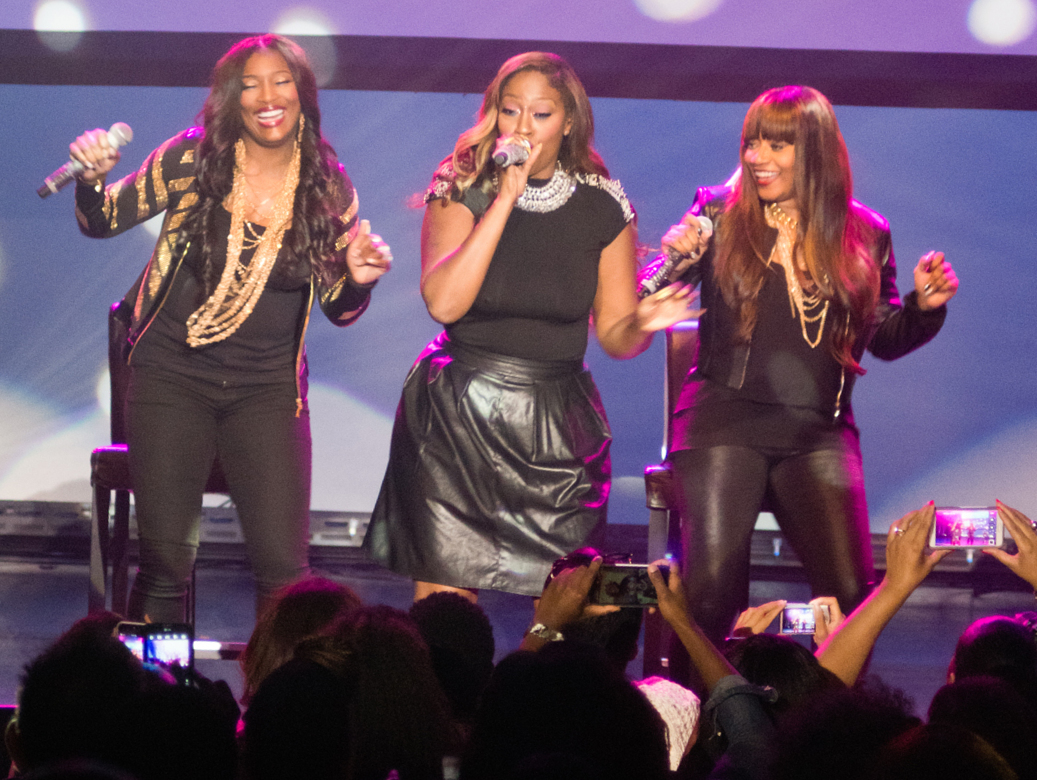
SWV (pictured in 2014) had two number ones in 1993.

Billboard published a weekly chart in 1993 ranking the top-performing singles in the United States in African American-oriented genres; the chart has undergone various name changes over the decades to reflect the evolution of black music and has been published as Hot R&B/Hip-Hop Songs since 2005. In 1993, it was published under the title Hot R&B Singles, and 15 different singles reached number one.

Whitney Houston's "I Will Always Love You" broke several chart records that year. Already number one for four weeks the previous year, it would spend seven more weeks at number one. In doing so, it became the first single in the history of the R&B charts to block a new song from entering number one in the beginning of the year. Also with the song spending eleven weeks at number one, it broke the record for being the longest-running number one single since Billboard merged its previously separate R&B sales and airplay charts in 1958.

A number of acts topped the chart for the first time in 1993: Naughty by Nature, Dr. Dre, Snoop Dogg, Silk, H-Town, SWV, Tag Team, Ice Cube, Das EFX, Xscape and DRS.

On the issue of Billboard, dated February 20, 1993, hip-hop group Naughty by Nature entered number one with their single "Hip Hop Hooray". It was replaced the following week by the duo of Dr. Dre and Snoop Dogg with their single, "Nuthin' but a 'G' Thang", staying at the top spot for two weeks. The single was the leading track off Dr. Dre's solo debut album, The Chronic, which would go on to become one of the most important and influential albums of the 1990s and one of the best-produced hip-hop albums. In 2019, the album was selected by the Library of Congress for preservation in the National Recording Registry as "culturally, historically, or aesthetically significant".

Snoop Dogg himself would later release his own debut solo album, Doggystyle, which like The Chronic, would also go on to become one of the most significant albums of the 1990s, as well as one of the most important hip-hop albums ever released. Much like The Chronic, the distinctive sounds of Doggystyle helped introduce the hip-hop subgenre of G-funk to a mainstream audience, bringing forward West Coast hip-hop as a dominant force in the early-mid 1990s. Snoop Dogg would go on to have a prolific music career, selling over 23 million albums in the United States, and 35 million albums worldwide.

The Atlanta-based R&B group Silk's "Freak Me" would top the charts for nine straight weeks, the longest run of any act that year, starting from March 13 until May 1. Many of the band's early hits were produced by Keith Sweat. The Houston-based vocal group H-Town hit number one with their song "Knockin' Da Boots", which was then replaced after four weeks by the female vocal group SWV's first number one single "Weak", which was inspired by writer Brian Alexander Morgan's crush on the R&B singer Chante Moore, spending two weeks at the top spot.

Tag Team's "Whoomp! (There It Is)" then replaced that song at number one. Rapper Ice Cube also hit number one for the first time with his song "Check Yo Self", which featured the rap group Das EFX. On the October 16 issue, another R&B vocal group Xscape scored their first number one single with the Jermaine Dupri-produced "Just Kickin' It" for four weeks. They were then replaced by the song "Gangsta Lean" from the vocal group DRS, which spent six weeks at number one from November 13 to December 18. SWV was the only act that year to have two number one singles. Four of 1993's R&B number-ones also topped Billboard's pop chart, the Hot 100.

== Chart history ==
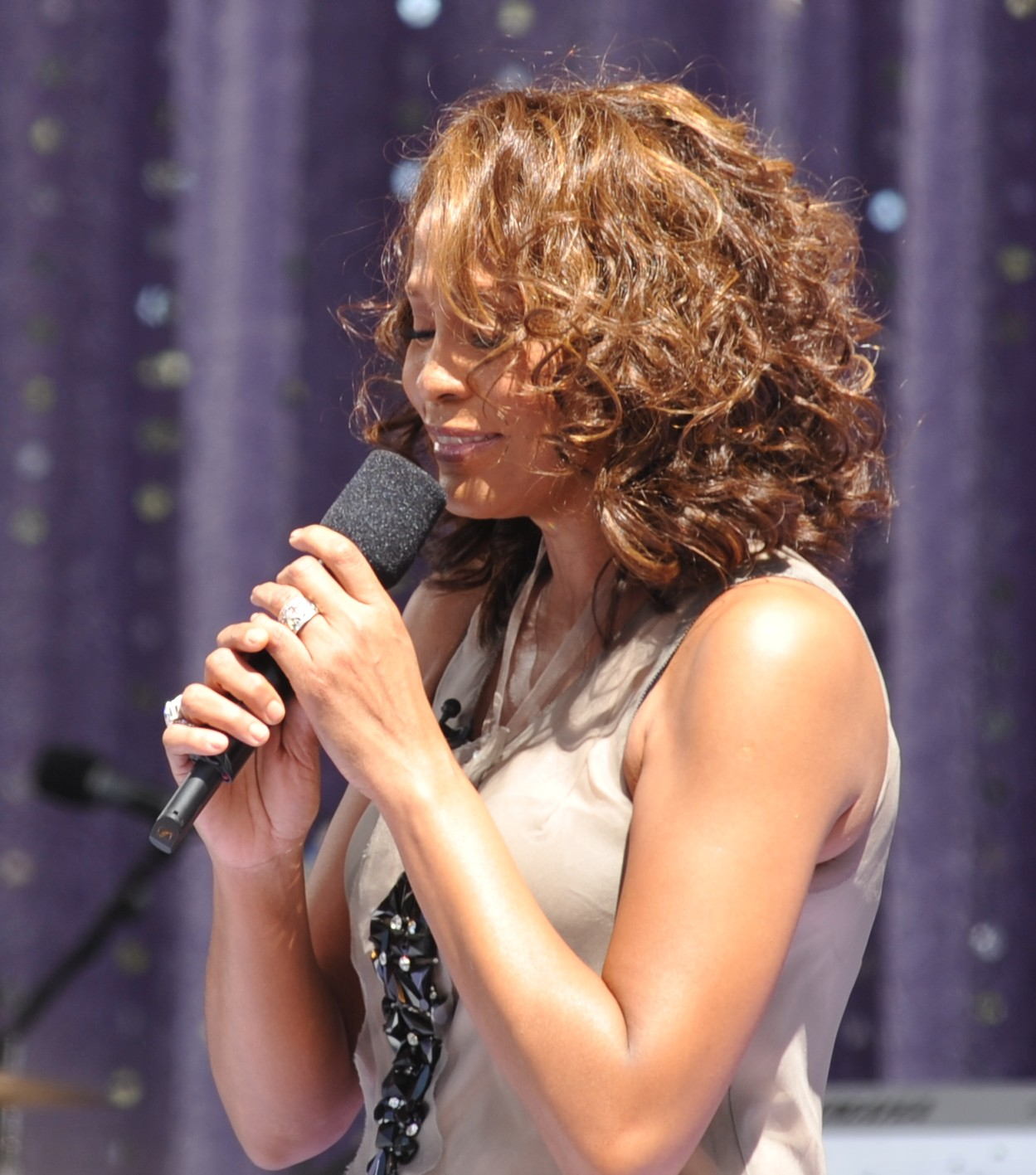
"I Will Always Love You" by Whitney Houston (pictured in 2009) was the best-selling R&B single of 1993.

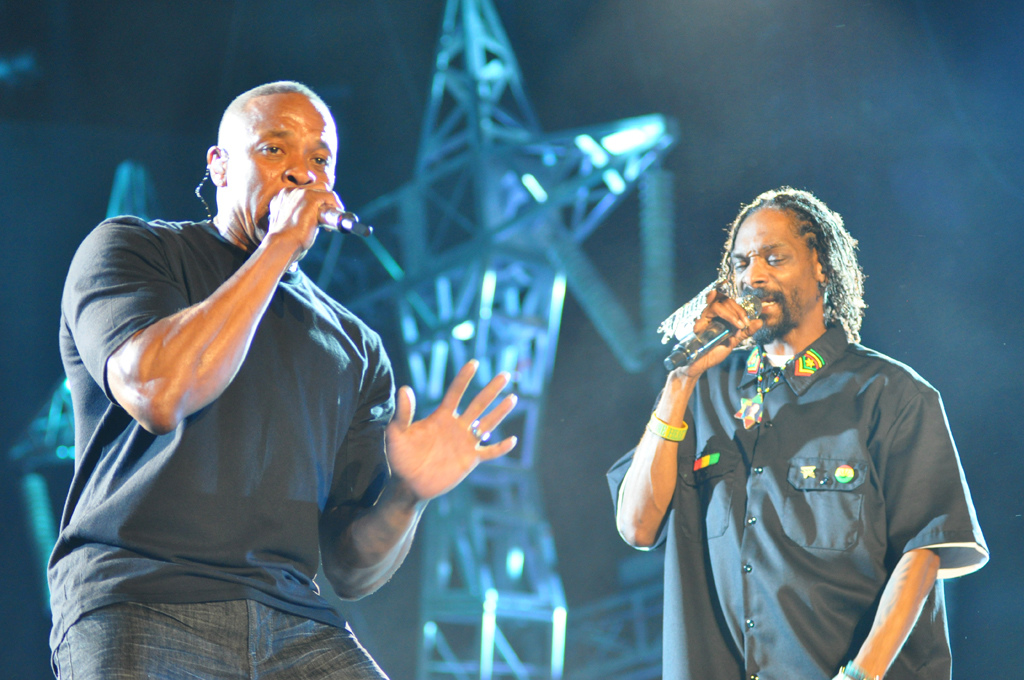
Dr. Dre and Snoop Dogg (pictured in 2012) hit number one with "Nuthin' but a 'G' Thang".

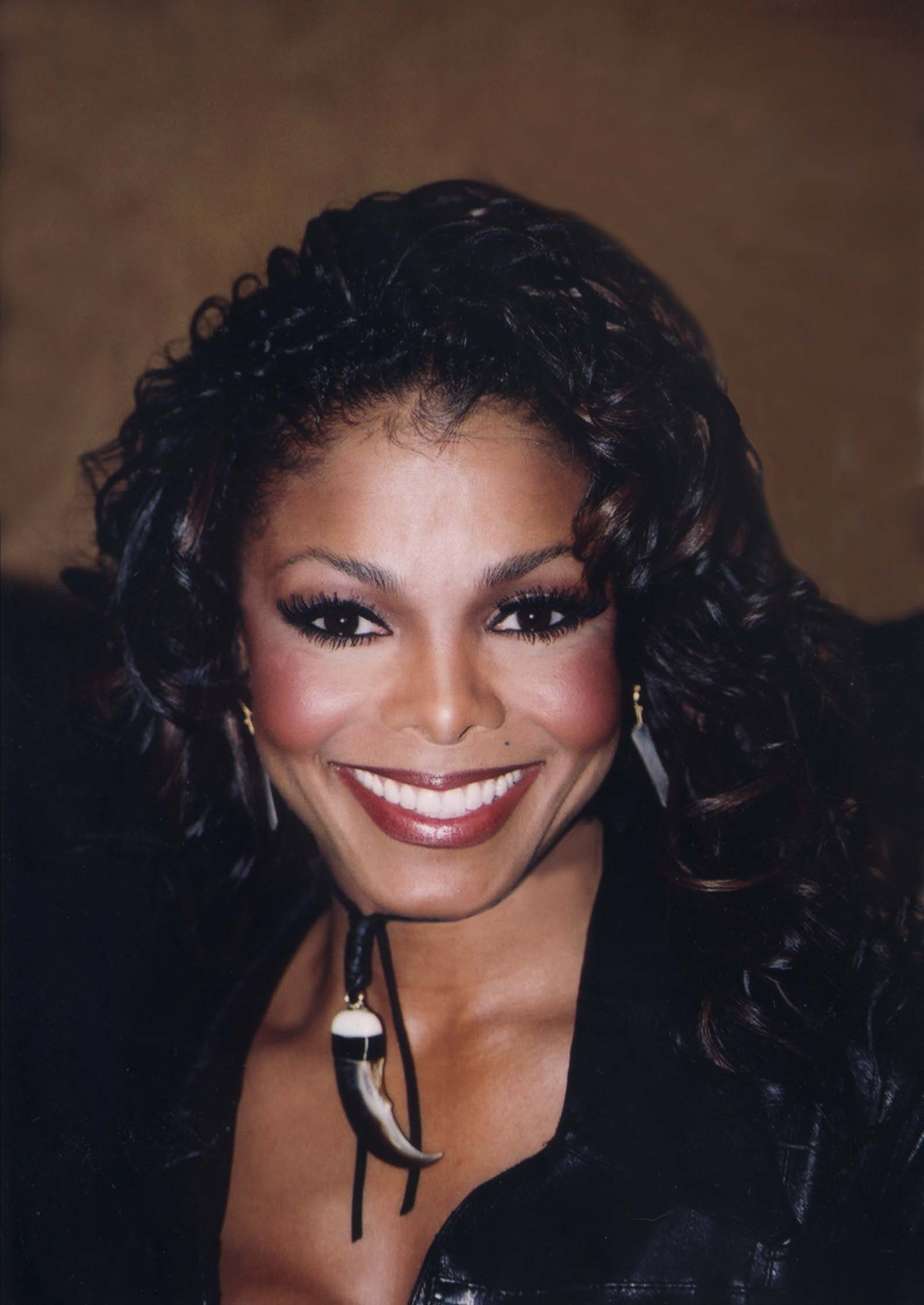
"That's the Way Love Goes" by Janet Jackson (pictured in 2002) spent four weeks at number one.

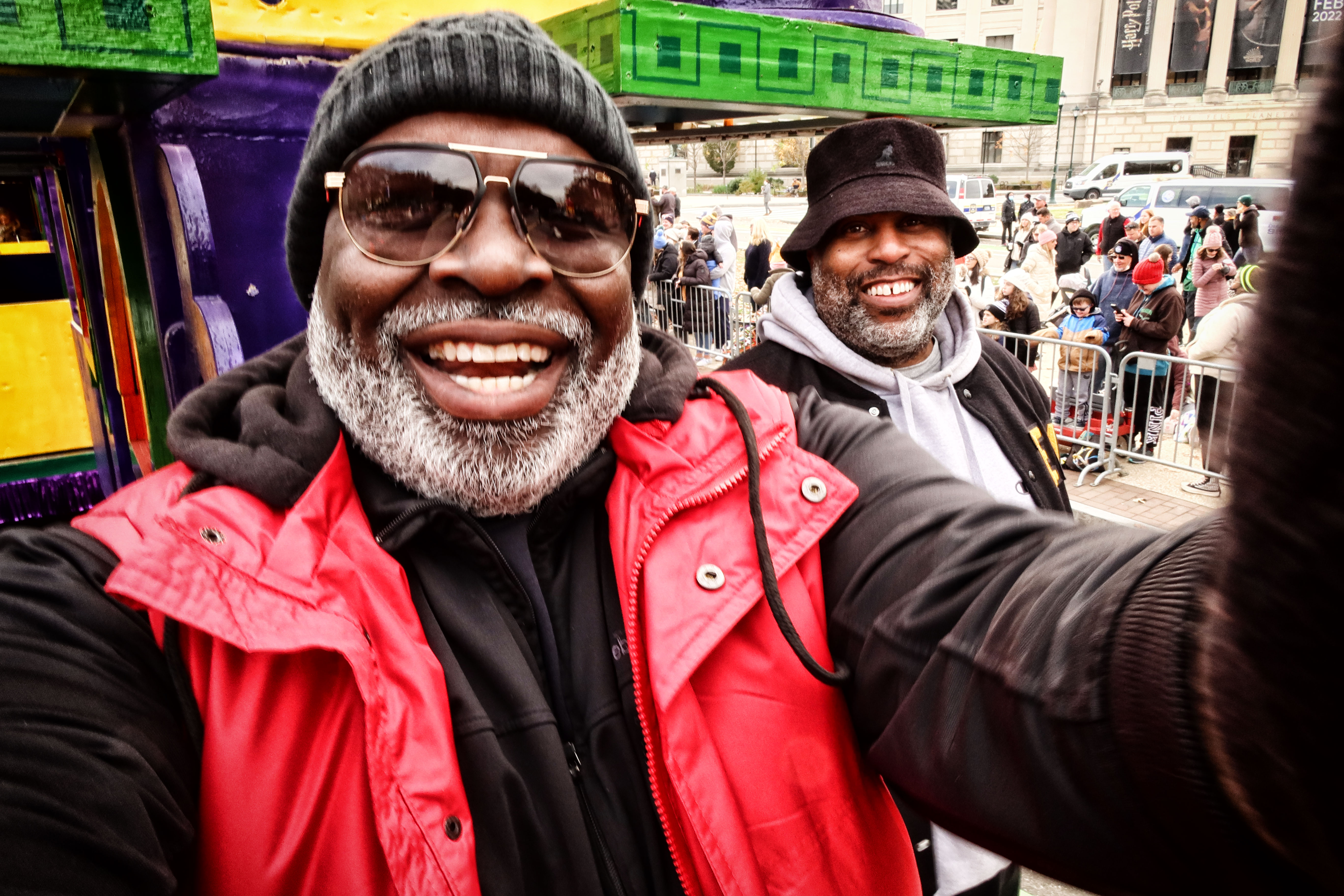
Tag Team (pictured in 2021) spent a week at number one with "Whoomp! (There It Is)".

Key
†	Indicates number 1 on Billboard's year-end R&B singles chart

Issue date	Song	Artist(s)
January 2	"I Will Always Love You" †	Whitney Houston
January 9	"I Will Always Love You" †	Whitney Houston
January 16	"I Will Always Love You" †	Whitney Houston
January 23	"I Will Always Love You" †	Whitney Houston
January 30	"I Will Always Love You" †	Whitney Houston
February 6	"I Will Always Love You" †	Whitney Houston
February 13	"I Will Always Love You" †	Whitney Houston
February 20	"Hip Hop Hooray"	Naughty By Nature
February 27	"Nuthin' But a 'G' Thang"	Dr. Dre featuring Snoop Doggy Dogg
March 6	"Nuthin' But a 'G' Thang"	Dr. Dre featuring Snoop Doggy Dogg
March 13	"Freak Me"	Silk
March 20	"Freak Me"	Silk
March 27	"Freak Me"	Silk
April 3	"Freak Me"	Silk
April 10	"Freak Me"	Silk
April 17	"Freak Me"	Silk
April 24	"Freak Me"	Silk
May 1	"Freak Me"	Silk
May 8	"That's the Way Love Goes"	Janet Jackson
May 15	"That's the Way Love Goes"	Janet Jackson
May 22	"That's the Way Love Goes"	Janet Jackson
May 29	"That's the Way Love Goes"	Janet Jackson
June 5	"Knockin' Da Boots"	H-Town
June 12	"Knockin' Da Boots"	H-Town
June 19	"Knockin' Da Boots"	H-Town
June 26	"Knockin' Da Boots"	H-Town
July 3	"Weak"	SWV
July 10	"Weak"	SWV
July 17	"Whoomp! (There It Is)"	Tag Team
July 24	"Lately"	Jodeci
July 31	"Lately"	Jodeci
August 7	"Check Yo Self"	Ice Cube featuring Das EFX
August 14	"Lately"	Jodeci
August 21	"Lately"	Jodeci
August 28	"Right Here/Human Nature"	SWV
September 4	"Right Here/Human Nature"	SWV
September 11	"Right Here/Human Nature"	SWV
September 18	"Right Here/Human Nature"	SWV
September 25	"Right Here/Human Nature"	SWV
October 2	"Right Here/Human Nature"	SWV
October 9	"Right Here/Human Nature"	SWV
October 16	"Just Kickin' It"	Xscape
October 23	"Just Kickin' It"	Xscape
October 30	"Just Kickin' It"	Xscape
November 6	"Just Kickin' It"	Xscape
November 13	"Gangsta Lean"	DRS
November 20	"Gangsta Lean"	DRS
November 27	"Gangsta Lean"	DRS
December 4	"Gangsta Lean"	DRS
December 11	"Gangsta Lean"	DRS
December 18	"Gangsta Lean"	DRS
December 25	"Can We Talk"	Tevin Campbell

== See also ==
- 1993 in music
- Billboard Year-End Hot R&B Singles of 1993
- List of number-one R&B hits (United States)
- List of number-one R&B albums of 1993 (U.S.)
