= List of Billboard number-one R&B albums of 1993 =

These are the Billboard magazine R&B albums that reached number one in 1993.

== Chart history ==
Issue date	Album	Artist
January 2	The Bodyguard	Soundtrack / Whitney Houston
January 9	The Bodyguard	Soundtrack / Whitney Houston
January 16	The Bodyguard	Soundtrack / Whitney Houston
January 23	The Bodyguard	Soundtrack / Whitney Houston
January 30	The Bodyguard	Soundtrack / Whitney Houston
February 6	The Chronic	Dr. Dre
February 13	The Chronic	Dr. Dre
February 20	The Chronic	Dr. Dre
February 27	The Chronic	Dr. Dre
March 6	The Chronic	Dr. Dre
March 13	19 Naughty III	Naughty by Nature
March 20	19 Naughty III	Naughty by Nature
March 27	Till Death Do Us Part	Geto Boys
April 3	Till Death Do Us Part	Geto Boys
April 10	Lose Control	Silk
April 17	14 Shots to the Dome	LL Cool J
April 24	14 Shots to the Dome	LL Cool J
May 1	The Chronic	Dr. Dre
May 8	The Chronic	Dr. Dre
May 15	The Chronic	Dr. Dre
May 22	Down with the King	Run-D.M.C.
May 29	Fever for Da Flavor	H-Town
June 5	janet.	Janet Jackson
June 12	janet.	Janet Jackson
June 19	janet.	Janet Jackson
June 26	Menace II Society	Soundtrack / Various artists
July 3	Menace II Society	Soundtrack / Various artists
July 10	Menace II Society	Soundtrack / Various artists
July 17	Menace II Society	Soundtrack / Various artists
July 24	Menace II Society	Soundtrack / Various artists
July 31	Menace II Society	Soundtrack / Various artists
August 7	Black Sunday	Cypress Hill
August 14	Black Sunday	Cypress Hill
August 21	Black Sunday	Cypress Hill
August 28	Black Sunday	Cypress Hill
September 4	The World Is Yours	Scarface
September 11	The World Is Yours	Scarface
September 18	Music Box	Mariah Carey
September 25	Music Box	Mariah Carey
October 2	Toni Braxton	Toni Braxton
October 9	Toni Braxton	Toni Braxton
October 16	187 He Wrote	Spice 1
October 23	187 He Wrote	Spice 1
October 30	Toni Braxton	Toni Braxton
November 6	It's On (~~Dr. Dre~~) 187^{um} Killa	Eazy-E
November 13	Get in Where You Fit In	Too Short
November 20	Get in Where You Fit In	Too Short
November 27	Midnight Marauders	A Tribe Called Quest
December 4	Shock of the Hour	MC Ren
December 11	Doggystyle	Snoop Doggy Dogg
December 18	Doggystyle	Snoop Doggy Dogg
December 25	Lethal Injection	Ice Cube

== See also ==
- 1993 in music
- R&B number-one hits of 1993 (USA)
