= I Can Go Deep =

Single by Silk

from the album Silk and A Low Down Dirty Shame (soundtrack)
- Released: October 24, 1994
- Genre: R&B, new jack swing
- Length: 6:22
- Label: Jive
- Producer: Mike "Nice" Chapman

Silk singles chronology
"Baby It's You" (1993)	"I Can Go Deep" (1994)	"Cry On" (1994)

A Low Down Dirty Shame singles chronology
"Get the Girl, Grab the Money and Run" (1994)	"I Can Go Deep" (1994)	"Shame" (1994)

"I Can Go Deep" is a song by American R&B group Silk. The song was released as a single for the group's self-titled second album Silk (1995), as well as the third promotional single for the soundtrack to the 1994 film A Low Down Dirty Shame. Gary "Lil G" Jenkins sings lead.

The song peaked at number seventy-one on the Billboard Hot 100 chart.

== Track listing ==
CD

1. "I Can Go Deep" (LP Version) - 6:22
2. "I Can Go Deep" (Low Down Remix) - 6:10
3. "I Can Go Deep" (Mellow Mix) - 6:22
4. "I Can Go Deep" (Low Down Remix [Quiet Storm]) - 6:09
5. "I Can Go Deep" (LP Instrumental) - 6:22
6. "Birthday Girl" - 3:45

== Charts ==
Chart (1994)	Peak position
U.S. Billboard Hot 100	71
U.S. Hot R&B/Hip-Hop Singles & Tracks	22

== Personnel ==
Information taken from Discogs.

- guitar – Rob Cunningham
- keyboards – Trent Thomas
- mixing – Tony Maserati, Chris Trevett
- production – Mike "Nice" Chapman
- production (additional) – Art & Rhythm, Trent Thomas
- remixing – Trent Thomas
- writers - Anthony Evers
- recorded at Beachwood Studios by Lee Mars & Howard Perl
