= The Payback (song) =

"The Payback – Part I"

Single by James Brown

from the album The Payback
- B-side: "The Payback – Part II"
- Released: February 1974
- Recorded: August 4, 1973 (basic tracks); September 1973 (brass and female vocal overdubs)
- Studio: August: International (Augusta, Georgia); September: Advantage (New York City)
- Genre: Funk
- Length: 3:30 (Part I); 4:07 (Part II)
- Label: Polydor (14223)
- Songwriters: James Brown; Fred Wesley; John Starks
- Producer: James Brown

James Brown charting singles chronology
"Stoned to the Bone – Part 1" (1973)	"The Payback – Part I" (1974)	"My Thang" (1974)

Audio video
- "The Payback" on YouTube

Audio sample
- file; help

"The Payback" is a funk song by James Brown, the title track from his 1973 album of the same name. The song's lyrics, originally written by trombonist and bandleader Fred Wesley but heavily revised by Brown himself soon before it was recorded, concern the revenge he plans to take against a man who betrayed him. The song uses a sparse, open arrangement and wah-wah guitar – a relative rarity in Brown's previous funk recordings. The female vocals are performed by Brown's principal backup singer Martha High. Released as a two-part single (featuring a radio announcer at the beginning of part one, DJ copies edited the announcer out) in February 1974, it was the first in an unbroken succession of three singles by Brown to reach #1 on the R&B charts that year – the last chart-toppers of his career. It also peaked at number 26 on the Billboard Hot 100. It was his second, and final, single to be certified gold by the RIAA.

== Background ==
The song and the album of the same name were originally recorded by Brown as the accompanying soundtrack to the blaxploitation film Hell Up in Harlem (1973), but was rejected by the movie's producers as "the same old James Brown stuff." An incensed Brown decided to release the album and let it stand on its own merits. The subsequent soundtrack was then recorded by Motown Records artist Edwin Starr. Later, Brown recorded "Rapp Payback (Where Iz Moses)", a reworking of "The Payback", in 1980.

James Brown's tour director, Alan Leeds, mentions the background to the song in his autobiography:

A young lady in Brown's camp was having an affair with Harold Melvin. JB had just caught wind of her broken loyalty before he was about to record 'Revenge,' a song Fred Wesley had sketched out for the opening scene in Hell Up In Harlem. James tossed Wesley's lyrics aside and began freestyling what quickly became The Payback.

— Alan Leeds, There Was a Time: James Brown, The Chitlin' Circuit, and Me. Page 225. Post Hill Press, 2020.

== Commonly misheard lyrics ==
In the song, James Brown seems to say, "I don't know karate, but I know ka-razy." However, he is actually saying, "I don't know karate, but I know ka-razor." James Brown had taken the line from a comedy routine by Clay Tyson, who was the comedian of the James Brown Revue. Originally, the phrase was the punchline to a story about someone asking Tyson if he knew karate, with the implication that Tyson did not need to know karate because he carried a straight razor.

== Samples ==
"The Payback" song has been sampled by many musical artists, including numerous hip hop and R&B producers. En Vogue recorded two different hits, "Hold On" and "My Lovin' (You're Never Gonna Get It)", that were both based on loops from the song's rhythm track. LL Cool J sampled "The Payback" in his 1990 song "The Booming System". Guy used the enthusiastic whoops for Dog Me Out in 1991. Mary J. Blige sampled the song for her 1997 hit "Everything". Total and Brooklyn rapper The Notorious B.I.G. sampled the song's intro in their 1995 hit "Can't You See". Girl group, SWV used the sample in their song "On & On" featuring Erick Sermon on their second album New Beginning. Keith Sweat R&B group Silk, in the song "Happy Days" sampled "The Payback" from their 1992 debut album, Lose Control, which was produced by Sweat and featured on the track. Big Black released a loose cover of the song on their 1984 Racer-X EP. Massive Attack also sampled the song on their title track "Protection" from the 1995 album of the same name. Former Nuttin' Nyce member Eboni Foster sampled the song on the single, "Crazy for You" from her only studio album Just What You Want, released in 1998. Compton rapper Kendrick Lamar used elements of the sample on the hit single "King Kunta" from his 2015 album To Pimp a Butterfly. Also sampled in Compton's Most Wanted's "Final Chapter" off of the album Straight Check'n Em. Chicago-born rapper/MC, Common also sampled the track in his song titled "Payback Is A Grandmother" which appears on the album Like Water For Chocolate.

== Appearances in other media ==
- The song was used in the Grand Theft Auto: San Andreas soundtrack on the Rare groove radio station Master Sounds 98.3.
- The song was used in the Guy Ritchie film Lock, Stock and Two Smoking Barrels.
- The song was used on the original soundtrack album for When We Were Kings (1997)
- The song was used in the 2001 Jesse Dylan film How High.
- The song was used in the 2002 Mars Callahan film Poolhall Junkies.
- A sample of the song is used in the theme for ESPN's NBA Countdown.
- The song was used in a season two episode of Everybody Hates Chris.
- The song was used in season three of The Wire; the song is playing in the poolhall that the deacon frequents, when Cutty comes to him to discuss the boxing gym.
- The song was used in the Hughes Brothers film Dead Presidents.
- The song was used in season three episode 10 of The Blacklist.
- The song was used in the first-season finale of the FX television show Damages.
- The song was used in an episode of Scrubs, during one of J.D.'s fantasies about how cool it is to enter the hospital as a surgeon.
- The song was used in the movie Hollywood Shuffle, the melody of the song is used during the dress rehearsal of the movie "Jivetime Jimmy's Revenge" – the movie in which Bobby (Robert Townsend) won the lead role as "Jimmy." Jimmy also uses the lyrics "I'm mad, I want revenge" when his brother dies in his arms.
- The song is used in many professional boxing ring entrances, but most notably used by Lennox Lewis during the ringwalk prior to his heavyweight championship rematch with Hasim Rahman in 2001, which Lewis won by knockout.
- The song was used in an episode of The Bernie Mac Show.
- The song was used in the television show The Cleveland Show in the episode entitled "The Curious Case of Jr. Working at The Stool".
- In May 1995, the song was featured prominently in the opening scene of "Catman Comes Back", the first-season finale of the FOX police drama television series New York Undercover.
- The song was used in the 2012 Quentin Tarantino film Django Unchained; the song was remixed in a mashup with the 2Pac song "Untouchable".
- The lyrics "I don't know karate, but I know ka-razor" was used by Magneto in the 2014 Bryan Singer film X-Men: Days of Future Past.
- The song was used in season four episode five of Billions.
- The song was used in "They Reminisce Over You", the second-season finale of the Netflix television series Luke Cage.
- The song played during the end credits of the fourth episode of the second season of Titans.
- The song played briefly near the end of an episode on the 2018 series Unsolved.
- The song was used in the trailer of the film Highest 2 Lowest (2025).

== Certifications ==
Region	Certification	Certified units/sales
United States (RIAA)	Gold	1,000,000^{^}
^{^} Shipments figures based on certification alone.
