= Blayse =

American R&B supergroup

- Origin: United States
- Genres: R&B, soul
- Years active: 2006–2007
- Past members: Terrell Phillips; Marc Nelson; Tony Grant; Gary "Lil G" Jenkins

Blayse was an American R&B supergroup, which consisted of Terrell Phillips (formerly of Blackstreet), Marc Nelson and Tony Grant (formerly of Az Yet) and Gary "Lil G" Jenkins (formerly of Silk). The group name is an acronym developed by combining the names of the members' former group affiliations (BL from Blackstreet, AY from Az Yet, S from Silk, E added to denote the phrase "Everything You Could Want").

The group was formed in 2006 by Tony Grant and Marc Nelson who later added Gary Jenkins and Terrell Phillips to complete the quartet. All four group members have extensive experience in not only singing, but writing lyrics, music production, global touring, playing various instruments, video direction experience and live stage play performance experience. All four member sing first tenor and alternate the position of lead singer. Their first sample recordings, Back For My Heart and Forever drew international attention and the group decided to press forward with serious pursuit of completing the project. Their debut single was released in September 2007 followed by their first U.S. tour as a group

Blayse has worked with Mike City, Trackmasters, Shep Crawford, The Co-Stars, Orange Factory and Stargate on their debut album. However, as of 2012, nothing has come to fruition.

In a radio interview in late 2014, Marc Nelson stated that the group will be reforming. There is no word yet on whether this will result in an album release.

== Sampler ==
Blayse never released an actual album, but they did make an album sampler in 2007.

1. Can I Take You There 3:58
2. Feel Good Music 3:20
3. Back For My Heart 3:31
4. Forever 3:30
5. I Can't Make You Love Me 3:31
6. My Story 4:02
7. What Am I Supposed To Do 4:13
8. When You're Havin My Baby 3:34
