= Silk (album) =

Studio album by Silk
- Released: November 28, 1995
- Length: 55:05
- Label: Elektra
- Producer: Tina Antoine; Rory Bennett; Mike Chapman; Dave Hall; John Howcott; Gerald Levert; Myron McKinley; Edwin Nicholas; Emanuel Officer; Donald Parks; Silk; Soulshock & Karlin; Trent Thomas; Darin Whittington

Silk chronology
Lose Control (1992)	Silk (1995)	Tonight (1999)

Singles from Silk
- 1. "I Can Go Deep" Released: October 24, 1994; 2. "Hooked on You" Released: October 17, 1995; 3. "Don't Rush" Released: March 5, 1996

Silk is the self-titled second studio album by American R&B group Silk. It was released on November 28, 1995, through Elektra Records. The album peaked at number forty-six on the US Billboard 200 chart.

== Critical reception ==
Professional ratings
Review scores
Source	Rating
AllMusic	1.5/5 stars
Los Angeles Times	3/4 stars
Muzik	(Ressler) (Jones)

Stephen Thomas Erlewine at AllMusic called the group's vocals on the album "impressive." Erlewine also gave note to the production, which he referred to as "seamless without being overly slick. The only problem with Silk, then, is the wildly uneven material." The ballad "How Could You Say You Love Me," and third single "Don't Rush" were praised by Upscale magazine.

== Chart performance ==
Silk peaked at forty-six on the US Billboard 200.

== Track listing ==
Silk track listing
No.	Title	Writer(s)	Producer(s)	Length
1.	"Hooked on You"	Kipper Jones; Kenneth Karlin; Andrea Martin; Carsten Schack	Soulshock and Karlin	4:51
2.	"Because of Your Love"	Chambers; Karlin; Schack	Soulshock and Karlin	4:19
3.	"It's So Good"	Karlin; Martin; Schack	Soulshock and Karlin	4:48
4.	"Don't Rush"	Wokie Stewart; Gary Jenkins	Stewart; Jenkins^{[a]}	4:22
5.	"I Can Go Deep"	Mike Chapman; Thomas Evans; K-Von; Trent Thomas	Chapman; Thomas; Silk^{[a]}	4:48
6.	"What Kind of Love Is This"	John Howcott; Emmanuel Officer; Donald Parks	Edwin Nicholas; Gerald Levert	4:39
7.	"Don't Go to Bed Mad"	Nicholas; Levert	Nicholas; Levert	6:57
8.	"Don't Cry for Me"	Darin Whittington; Gary Jenkins; Gary Glenn; Johnathen Rasboro	Whittington; Silk	6:02
9.	"Now That I've Lost You"	Brown; Martin; Ivan Matias; Dave Hall	Hall	4:41
10.	"How Could You Say You Love Me"	Officer; Myron McKinley	Parks; Officer; Howcott; McKinley	4:46
11.	"Remember Me"	Officer; Rory Bennett; Tina Antoine	Officer; Bennett; Antoine	4:52

Notes

- ^a signifies a co-producer

== Personnel ==
Information taken from Allmusic.

- art direction – Alli
- assistant engineering – Gerardo Lopez
- design – Alli
- drum programming – Rory Bennett, John Howcott, Gerald Levert, Edwin Nicholas, Donald Parks
- engineering – Tina Antoine, Jeff Bordett, Mike Chapman, John Howcott, Lisa Po-Ying Huang, Jay Lean, Paul Logus, Lee Mars, Carl Nappa, Alex Nesmith, Donald Parks, Jason Shablik, Ron A. Shaffer, Louie Teran, Darin Whittington
- executive production – Silk
- grooming – Dennis Mitchell
- group – Silk
- guitar – Craig B., Rob Cunningham, Charlie Singleton
- keyboard programming – Rory Bennett, John Howcott, Gerald Levert, Myron McKinley, Edwin Nicholas, Donald Parks
- keyboards – Mike Chapman, Gary Jenkins, Trent Thomas
- make-up – Gwynnis Mosby
- mixing – Charles "Prince Charles" Alexander, Rob Chiarelli, Jay Lean, Tony Maserati, Johnny Most, Ron A. Shaffer, Soulshock
- multi-instruments – Myron McKinley, Darin Whittington
- photography – Marc Baptiste
- production – Tina Antoine, Rory Bennett, Mike Chapman, Dave Hall, John Howcott, Gary Jenkins, Karlin, Gerald Levert, Myron McKinley, Edwin Nicholas, Emanuel Officer, Donald Parks, Silk, Soulshock, Trent Thomas, Darin Whittington
- sample programming – Mike Chapman
- sequencing – Gerald Levert, Edwin Nicholas
- stylist – Agnes Cammock
- synthesizer – Gary Jenkins
- vocal arranging – Horace Brown, Gordon Chambers, Karlin, Gerald Levert, Andrea Martin, Ivan Matias, Emanuel Officer, Soulshock
- vocals (background) – Silk

== Charts ==
=== Weekly charts ===
Weekly chart performance for Silk
Chart (1995)	Peak position
Australian Albums (ARIA)	199
US Billboard 200	46
US Top R&B/Hip-Hop Albums (Billboard)	10

=== Year-end charts ===
Year-end chart performance for Silk
Chart (1996)	Position
US Top R&B/Hip-Hop Albums (Billboard)	77

== Certifications ==
Certifications for Silk
Region	Certification	Certified units/sales
United States (RIAA)	Gold	500,000^{^}
^{^} Shipments figures based on certification alone.

== Release history ==
Silk release history
Region	Date	Format	Label	Ref(s)
United States	November 28, 1995	CD; cassette; vinyl	Elektra	
