= Coming Out Party (disambiguation) =

Coming Out Party may refer to:

== Films ==
- Coming Out Party, a 1934 American comedy film directed by John G. Blystone
- A Coming Out Party, a 1961 British comedy film directed by Ken Annakin
- Coming Out Party, a 2003 film with René Hicks and directed by Rich Tackenberg

== Other uses ==
- Coming out party, a traditional term for debutante's ball
