= Quiet Storm (Silk album) =

Studio album by Silk
- Released: March 18, 2016
- Length: 42:10
- Label: Shanachie
- Producer: Darrell "Delite" Allamby; Blac; Marcus "Daheatmizer" Devine; Andy G.; Wirlie Morris

Silk chronology
Always and Forever (2006)	Quiet Storm (2016)

Quiet Storm is the seventh studio album by American R&B group Silk. It was released by Shanachie Records on March 18, 2016 in the United States. Their first album in a decade, it peaked at number 26 on the US Top R&B/Hip-Hop Albums chart.

== Critical reception ==
Professional ratings
Review scores
Source	Rating
Exclaim!	3/5 stars

Exclaim! critic Matt Bauer remarked that Quiet Storm "doesn't stray far from the lush, melodic harmonies that enticed listeners out of their Karl Kanis and into their boudoirs with such well crafted, carnally minded gems as "Girl U For Me" and "It Had to Be You" [...] While this comeback falls short of Silk's previous efforts, Quiet Storm is sure to be the soundtrack to more than a few romantic encounters.

== Track listing ==
Quiet Storm track listing
No.	Title	Writer(s)	Producer(s)	Length
1.	"Quiet Storm"	Darrell "Delite" Allamby	Allamby	5:29
2.	"Love 4 U 2 Like Me"	Christopher McNeal; Eric Grant; James Champion; Wirlie Morris	Morris	4:21
3.	"Slow Grind"	Gary Jenkins; Jonathan Rasboro; Marcus "Daheatmizer" Devine	Devine	3:20
4.	"Baby Suit"	Allamby; Kenny Whitehead	Allamby	4:05
5.	"She's the One"	Anwar Phillips; Kelvin McCutcheon	Blac; Andy G.	3:32
6.	"Billionaire"	Grant; Champion; Morris	Morris	3:48
7.	"On My Mind"	Rock City; Morris	Morris	4:32
8.	"Baby Maker"	Phillips; McCutcheon	Andy G.	3:50
9.	"I Love You"	Allamby	Allamby	5:10
10.	"Only Takes One"	Grant; Champion; Morris	Morris	4:03

== Charts ==
Chart performance for Quiet Storm
Chart (2016)	Peak position
US Top R&B/Hip-Hop Albums (Billboard)	26

== Release history ==
Quiet Storm release history
Region	Date	Format	Label	Ref(s)
United States	March 18, 2016	CD; digital download	Shanachie	
