= Marc Nelson (singer) =

American musician (born 1971)

- Born: January 23, 1971 (age 55)
- Genres: R&B; soul; jazz; new jack swing
- Occupations: Singer; songwriter; actor
- Instruments: Vocals; piano; keyboards
- Years active: 1988–present
- Labels: Capitol Records (1989–1992); LaFace Records (1995–1997); Columbia (1998–2001); Focused Artist Entertainment (2017–present)

Marc Nelson (born January 23, 1971) is an American singer and songwriter.

He was an original member of Boyz II Men while still attending the Philadelphia High School for the Creative and Performing Arts. However, a management agreement forced Nelson to leave the group to pursue a solo career before the group released their debut album, Cooleyhighharmony.

His mother, Phyllis Nelson, was also a singer.

== Boyz II Men ==
After hearing New Edition's song "Boys to Men" on the radio, the group changed their name to Boyz II Men. In 1989, the group met Michael Bivins and began making arrangements to sign the group to a major label and begin recording. In the interim, the group encountered delays in recording their album. Prior to being discovered by Bivins, the members had all previously signed a management deal with a local company in Philadelphia. Marc Nelson, who was 18 years old at the time, faced difficulty breaking the contract with this company due to his age. The other members were all minors. Once everything was settled with Boyz II Men and Motown, Nelson still couldn't be released from his previous management, forcing him to make a choice to pursue a solo career instead of continuing with the group. His solo album, I Want You, was released only a few months after Cooleyhighharmony in September 1991.

== Later career ==
=== I Want You ===
After signing a solo deal with Capitol Records, Nelson scored a hit with a cover of Marvin Gaye's "I Want You", which hit No. 26 on the R&B charts. His follow-up, "Count On Me", reached No. 48 on the R&B charts. Nelson released his solo album, I Want You, in 1991.

Following the release of his solo album, Nelson began concentrating his talents as a songwriter. Drawing the attention of Babyface, Nelson wrote for artists like Toni Braxton, Brandy, Tamia, Tyrese and Jon B. Through Babyface, Nelson met the four members of the group Az Yet and was added to the line-up as second lead vocalist; the group was signed to LaFace Records.

=== Az Yet ===
As a member of Az Yet, Nelson found success. The group's self-titled debut album, released in 1996, went platinum. A single on the album, "Last Night", went gold and reached No. 9 on the Billboard Hot 100 chart. Their second single, "Hard To Say I'm Sorry" did even better, going platinum and reaching No. 8 on the Hot 100.

=== Chocolate Mood ===
Nelson left Az Yet and began writing intensely. Subsequently, he released his second solo album, Chocolate Mood, in 1999. The album featured Nelson's biggest solo hit, "15 Minutes", which reached No. 4 on the R&B charts and No. 27 on the Billboard Hot 100. He also featured on the duet "After All is Said and Done" with Beyoncé, on the soundtrack to the motion picture The Best Man (1999).

On January 9, 2007, SESAC honored Nelson at their third Jazz Awards Luncheon, for his authorship on "It's On Tonight" by Brian Culbertson. The event honored jazz writers whose works achieved Top 5 status on the jazz charts from January 1, 2006, through December 31, 2006.

=== Marc: My Words ===
Nelson released his first independent project, Marc: My Words (Lyric Masters 911) on July 24, 2007. Nelson wrote or co-wrote the lyrics on all 15 tracks of the album. He also produced or co-produced all of the tracks on the album. Nelson extracted the material for the release from his existing catalog of songs written between 2001 and 2007, and began recording the material in 2006. The album features the original version of "I Don't Wanna Be In Love" (co-written by jazz artist Brian Culbertson) which also appears on the 2007 release Crystal City by Andre Ward.

=== Blayse ===
Nelson was also a founding member of the R&B super-group Blayse, with fellow R&B veterans Tony Grant of Az Yet, Gary "Lil G" Jenkins of Silk (group), and Terrell Phillips of Blackstreet. Although the group managed to record several songs, the recordings were never publicly released, the album was never completed, and the group disbanded in December 2007. Lil G returned to Silk, Nelson returned to Az Yet, and Tony Grant toured in the Tyler Perry stage production The Marriage Counselor (from January 2008 through May 2008).

=== Additional projects ===
Nelson released the R&B/Soul single "Wishing You The Worst" on July 24, 2017. The song was released independently via his production company Focused Artist Entertainment.

Nelson was nominated for an Emmy Award, for penning the theme song to the 2016 animated Christmas television film Snowy Day. The title song was performed by Boyz II Men.

== Discography ==
=== Studio albums ===
Album	Information	Charts and certifications	Singles
I Want You	Released: 1991; Label: Capitol Records; Solo	Chart peak: RIAA Certification: Gold	"I Want You"; "Count on Me"
Az Yet	Released: 1996; Label: LaFace Records; Only album recorded with Az Yet	Chart peak: RIAA Certification: Platinum	"Last Night" (Platinum); "Hard to Say I'm Sorry" featuring Peter Cetera (Platinum, Grammy-nominated)
Chocolate Mood	Released: 1999; Label: Columbia Records; Solo	Chart peak: RIAA Certification: (none)	"15 Minutes"; "Chocolate Mood"; "Lady in My Life"
Marc: My Words	Released: July 24, 2007; Label: Lyric Masters 911; Solo	Chart peak: —; RIAA Certification: —	"Just Say So"; "I Don't Wanna Be in Love"; "Be Glad Tonight"

=== Contributions ===
Year	Album	Album artist	Song	Role
1993	The Program	Various	"Lay Down Your Love"	Vocals
1996	Secrets	Toni Braxton	"Come on Over Here"	Writer/Vocals
1996	The Preacher's Wife	Whitney Houston		Background vocals
1996	The Day	Babyface	"Seven Seas"	Writer/Vocals
1997	Cool Relax	Jon B	"Don't Say"	Writer
1997	Simone Hines	Simone Hines	"Never Been Alone"	Writer
1997	To Make Me Who I Am	Aaron Neville	"Just to Be With You" "Yes, I Love You"	Writer
1998	Never Say Never	Brandy	"Truthfully"	Writer
1998	Tamia	Tamia	"Who Do You Tell"	Writer/Vocals
1998	Tyrese	Tyrese	"Tell Me, Tell Me"	Writer
1999	The Best Man (movie soundtrack)	Various	"After All Is Said and Done"	Vocals
2000	Big Momma's House (movie soundtrack)	Various	"Love's Not Love"	Lead vocals
2000	Bridging the Gap	Charlie Wilson	"Sweet Love"	Writer/Vocals
2005	It's On Tonight	Brian Culbertson	"It's On Tonight"	Writer
2005	Soul Symphony	Will Downing	"Make Time for Love"	Writer
2006	Transitions	Freddie Jackson	"Until the End of Time"	Writer/Vocals
2006	A Soulful Christmas	Brian Culbertson	"All Through The Christmas Night" "Silent Night"	Vocals/Writer
2007	Crystal City	Andre Ward	"I Don't Want to Be in Love"	Vocals/Producer

=== Singles ===
- "I Want You" (1991)
- "Count on Me" (1992)
- "Last Night" with Az Yet (1996)
- "Hard To Say I'm Sorry" with Az Yet & featuring Peter Cetera (1996)
- "That's All I Want" with Az Yet (1997)
- "15 Minutes" (1999)
- "Too Friendly" (2000)
- "Love's Not Love" (2000)
- "Wishing You The Worst" (2017)

== Stage play appearances ==
- Love Ain't Supposed to Hurt - Part II: The Wedding
- Tell Hell I Ain't Coming
- King Solomon Lives
- Men Cry in the Dark
- In-Laws From Hell
