= Ebony Eyes =

Ebony Eyes may refer to:

- "Ebony Eyes" (John D. Loudermilk song), a song written by John D. Loudermilk, recorded in 1961 by the Everly Brothers
- "Ebony Eyes" (Rick James song), a 1983 hit R&B single recorded by Rick James and Smokey Robinson
- "Ebony Eyes" (Bob Welch song), from the album French Kiss
- "Ebony Eyes", a song by Stevie Wonder from the album Songs in the Key of Life
- "Ebony Eyes", a song by Rico Bernasconi & Tuklan feat. A-Class & Sean Paul
- "Ebony Eyes", a song by the Stylistics from the album The Stylistics
