= Fever for da Flavor =

Studio album by H-Town
- Released: 1993
- Recorded: 1992–93
- Genre: R&B
- Length: 42:10
- Label: Luke
- Producer: Bishop "Stick" Burrell

H-Town chronology
Fever for da Flavor (1993)	Beggin' After Dark (1994)

Singles from Fever for da Flavor
- 1. "Knockin' da Boots" Released: March 11, 1993; 2. "Lick U Up" Released: July 14, 1993; 3. "Keepin' My Composure" Released: November 9, 1993; 4. "Baby I Wanna" Released: February 21, 1994

Fever for da Flavor is the debut studio album by the American R&B group H-Town. It was released in 1993 via Luke Records. It was produced primarily by Bishop "Stick" Burrell, with Uncle Luke serving as executive producer. The album peaked at number 16 on the Billboard 200 and topped the Top R&B Albums chart in the United States. It achieved Gold status by the Recording Industry Association of America on June 14, 1993, and went Platinum on August 18, 1993.

The album's lead single "Knockin' da Boots" made it to number 3 on the Billboard Hot 100 and topped the Hot R&B Songs chart. The second single "Lick U Up" was a minor hit, reaching number 67 on the Billboard Hot 100 and number 21 on the Hot R&B Songs. H-Town promoted the album by participating in the Coca-Cola Tour, which also included LL Cool J, Naughty by Nature, SWV, Shai, and Silk.

== Critical reception ==
Professional ratings
Review scores
Source	Rating
AllMusic	3/5 stars
The Gazette	D−
Los Angeles Times	2/4 stars

The Sun Sentinel wrote that "the trio and producer Bishop Burrell Sr. do pen hook-laden numbers that front-man Dino Conner croons with uncommon conviction." The Baltimore Sun said that "these Houstonians do occasionally indulge in vocal overkill, particularly on salacious slow jams like 'Knockin' da Boots'." The Los Angeles Times noted that "it's a wonder they don't suffer whiplash after segueing from the religious solemnity of 'Interlude' to ... lust-driven jams."

The Colorado Springs Gazette-Telegraph concluded that "the disc is spotty and much of it sounds like a Keith Sweat or Alexander O'Neal release." The Gazette determined that "the songs are mostly over-synthesized." Rolling Stone opined that "refreshingly absent are the slickly produced tracks and overmixed vocals." The Star Tribune listed Fever for da Flavor among the best albums of 1993.

== Track listing ==
All tracks are written by Keven A. Conner, Solomon Conner, Darryl Jackson and Bishop Paul Burrell Sr.

No.	Title	Length
1.	"Introduction"	0:25
2.	"Can't Fade da H"	3:44
3.	"Treat U Right"	4:11
4.	"Fever for da Flavor"	4:34
5.	"Sex Me"	3:49
6.	"H-Town Bounce"	3:41
7.	"Keepin' My Composure"	3:35
8.	"Interlude"	1:13
9.	"Lick U Up"	5:34
10.	"Knockin' da Boots"	5:31
11.	"Won't U Come Back"	4:40
12.	"Baby I Wanna"	5:14
Total length:		42:10

== Personnel ==
- Keven "Dino" Conner – vocals, arranger (track 7)
- Solomon "Shazam" Conner – vocals, arranger (track 7)
- Darryl "G.I." Jackson – vocals, arranger (track 7)
- Angee Griffin – additional vocals (track 6)
- Vashonda – additional vocals (track 9)
- Gary King – guitar (track 7)
- Gary Williams – bass (track 7)
- Bishop "Stick" Burrell – producer (tracks: 1–6, 8–12), arranger, engineering
- John "Swift" Catalon – producer (track 7)
- Eddie Miller – engineering
- Ted Stein – engineering
- Luther "Luke" Campbell – executive producer
- Milton Mizell – art direction, design
- Mark Hartshorn – photography

== Charts ==
Chart (1993)	Peak position
US Billboard 200	16
US Top R&B/Hip-Hop Albums (Billboard)	1

Singles

Year	Single	Peak position		
Year	Single	US Pop	US R&B	US Dance
1993	"Knockin' da Boots"	3	1	14
1993	"Lick U Up"	67	21	—
1993	"Keepin' My Composure"	—	46	—

== Certifications ==
Region	Certification	Certified units/sales
United States (RIAA)	Platinum	1,000,000^{^}
^{^} Shipments figures based on certification alone.

== See also ==
- List of number-one R&B albums of 1993 (U.S.)
