= Silktime =

Studio album by Silk
- Released: September 23, 2003
- Length: 52:02
- Labels: Silk Music; Liquid 8

Silk chronology
Love Session (2001)	Silktime (2003)	The Best of Silk (2004)

Silktime is the fifth studio album by American R&B group Silk. It was released on September 23, 2003 in the United States. Following their departure from Elektra Records, the album marked Silk's debut with their ownrecord label, Silk Music Group distributed., as well as their first album without former member Gary Jenkins. The album featured the songs "Silktime", "My Girl", "Alibi", "More", "You (The Baby Song)", "Check My Story" and a remake of Blue Magic's classic "Side Show". That song reunited them with their former mentor Keith Sweat.

== Critical reception ==
Professional ratings
Review scores
Source	Rating
AllMusic	2.5/5 stars

AllMusic editor Jonathan Widran rated the album two and a half stars out of five and wrote that "the boys are banking on the fact that their old fans will want to hear the wonderful ensemble vocalizing even when the production is trying too hard to be post-millennial. If they want to keep the harmony thriving, next time they should try something more organic."

== Track listing ==
Silktime track listing
No.	Title	Length
1.	"Interlude"	1:58
2.	"Take Control"	4:16
3.	"Silktime"	4:24
4.	"My Girl"	5:42
5.	"Alibi"	2:55
6.	"More"	5:46
7.	"You (The Baby Song)"	6:00
8.	"Check My Story"	5:03
9.	"Incredible"	3:47
10.	"Violin"	6:19
11.	"Side Show"	3:47
12.	"The End"	0:42
13.	"Band" (Skit)	1:19

== Charts ==
Chart performance for Silktime
Chart (2003)	Peak position
US Billboard 200	178
US Top R&B/Hip-Hop Albums (Billboard)	30

== Release history ==
Silktime release history
Region	Date	Format	Label	Ref(s)
United States	September 23, 2003	CD; digital download	Silk Music Group; Liquid 8 Entertainment	
