= A Low Down Dirty Shame (soundtrack) =

Soundtrack album by Various artists
- Released: November 8, 1994
- Recorded: 1993–1994
- Length: 74:45
- Labels: Jive; Hollywood
- Producers: Barry Hankerson (exec.); Adam "A-Plus" Carter; Mike Chapman; Cold 187um; K. Fingers; Fu-Schnickens; James "Jimmy Jam" Harris; Terry Lewis; Robert Kelly; Lyvio G.; Organized Konfusion; Pimp C; Erick Sermon; Trent Thomas; Touré

Singles from A Low Down Dirty Shame
- 1. "Down 4 Whateva" Released: October 12, 1994; 2. "Get the Girl, Grab the Money and Run" Released: October 24, 1994; 3. "I Can Go Deep" Released: October 24, 1994; 4. "Shame" Released: November 7, 1994; 5. "Turn It Up" Released: December 17, 1994

The A Low Down Dirty Shame - Music From the Motion Picture is the official soundtrack album to the hit 1994 film A Low Down Dirty Shame. The album was released on November 8, 1994 on Jive Records and Hollywood Records.

The soundtrack peaked at 70 on the Billboard 200 chart. By March 1995, it was certified gold in sales by the RIAA, after sales exceeding 500,000 copies in the United States.

== Release and reception ==
The album peaked at number seventy on the U.S. Billboard 200 and reached the fourteenth spot on the R&B albums chart. Stephen Thomas Erlewine of Allmusic, while noting that the entire album was well-produced, stated that "there is a noticeable lack of memorable material, leaving the record as nothing but a pleasant genre exercise." Critic David Browne in an Entertainment Weekly article graded it a "B−", calling most of the soundtrack "more workmanlike than inspired," like the song "Later On" by Casual. However, Browne praised the Zhané remake of the 1970s disco song "Shame" (originally sung by Evelyn "Champagne" King) and R. Kelly's contributions to the album as the soundtrack's positives.

Billboard's Larry Flick said the single release of "Get the Girl, Grab the Money, and Run" "stirs up some troublesome soul", but called its B-side, two different versions of "Later On", "the real gem".

== Track listing ==
No.	Title	Writer(s)	Artist	Length
1.	"Down 4 Whateva"	Larry Campbell; Nellee Hooper; Simon Law; Onnie Ponder; Beresford Romeo; LaTeece Wallace; Caron Wheeler	Nuttin' Nyce	4:52
2.	"Shame / Zhane's: Shame"	John H. Fitch Jr.; Reuben Cross	Zhané	4:16
3.	"I Can Go Deep"	Thomas Evans	Silk	4:48
4.	"Homie, Lover, Friend (Lookin' for My Homie Mix)"	Robert Kelly	R. Kelly	4:43
5.	"Turn It Up"	James Harris III; Terry Lewis; Raja-Neé; Ronald Isley; Rudolph Isley; Marvin Isley; O'Kelly Isley; Ernie Isley; Chris Jasper	Raja Nee	4:01
6.	"Stroke You Up (Remix)"	Robert Kelly	Changing Faces	4:33
7.	"The Thing I Like"	Robert Kelly	Aaliyah	3:24
8.	"Gotta Get Yo' Groove On"	Tevin Campbell; James Harris III; Terry Lewis	Tevin Campbell	4:30
9.	"Birthday Girl"	Larry Campbell	Hi-Five	3:38
10.	"Get the Girl, Grab the Money and Run"	Adam Carter; Opio Lindsey; Tajai Massey; Damani Thompson	Souls of Mischief	3:54
11.	"Cray-Z"	Roderick Roachford; Joseph A. Jones; Lennox Maturine; Lyvio R. Gay	Fu-Schnickens	5:10
12.	"Later On"	John Owens; Toure Duncan; David Rubinson; Herbie Hancock; Allee Willis	Casual	3:06
13.	"How's That"	Keith Murray; Erick Sermon; Reggie Noble	Erick Sermon and Redman	3:07
14.	"Let's Organize" (feat. Q-Tip)	Lawrence Baskerville; Ajb; Gmoney	Organized Konfusion	4:20
15.	"Ghetto Style"	Craig Simpkins; Juanita Carter	Smooth	4:33
16.	"Front, Back and Side to Side"	Bernard Freeman; Chad Butler; Freddie Southwell; Eric Wright; Andre Young; O'Shea Jackson	UGK	4:34
17.	"In Front of the Kids"	Duane Lee	Extra Prolific	2:42
18.	"U Rong 4 That"	Gregory Hutchinson; Kevyn Carter	Mz. Kilo	4:34
Total length:				74:45

== Chart history ==
=== Album ===
Chart (1994)	Peak position
U.S. Billboard 200	70
U.S. R&B Albums	14

=== Singles ===
Year	Single	Peak chart positions						
Year	Single	U.S. Billboard Hot 100	U.S. Dance Music/Club Play Singles	U.S. Hot Dance Music/Maxi-Singles Sales	U.S. Hot R&B/Hip-Hop Singles & Tracks	U.S. Hot Rap Singles	U.S. Rhythmic Top 40	U.S. Top 40 Mainstream
1994	"Down 4 Whateva"	92	—	38	43	—	—	—
1994	"Get the Girl, Grab the Money and Run"	—	—	23	—	50	—	—
1994	"I Can Go Deep"	71	—	—	22	—	—	—
1994	"Shame"	28	46	6	12	—	9	38
1994	"Turn It Up"	-	-	-	31	—	-	-

"—" denotes releases that did not chart.

== Certifications ==
Region	Certification	Certified units/sales
United States (RIAA)	Gold	500,000^{^}
^{^} Shipments figures based on certification alone.

== Personnel ==
Information taken from Allmusic.

- arranging – Jimmy Jam, Terry Lewis
- assistant – Chris Agamanolis, Martin Czembor, Brandon Harris, Steve Hodge, Joshua Shapera, Steve Souder, Jeff Taylor
- assistant engineering – Chris Agamanolis, Lane Craven, Martin Czembor, Brandon Harris, Vaughn Merrick, Joshua Shapera, Steve Souder, Jeff Taylor, Steve Warner
- bass – Terry Lewis
- chanting – McKinley Horton, Jellybean Johnson, Raja Nee, Jeff Taylor
- composing – John Fitch
- drum programming – Lance Alexander, Jeff Taylor
- drums – Mike Chapman
- engineering – Mike Chapman, Bob Fudjinski, Eric Gast, Stephen George, Steve Hodge, Matt Kelley, Adam Kudzin, Lee Mars, Peter Mokran, Mark Paladino, Keith Senior, Jason Shablik, Martin Stebbing, Jeff Taylor, Chris Trevett
- executive production – Barry Hankerson
- guitar – Robert Cunningham, Keith Henderson, Peter Mokran, Joshua Shapera
- horn – Bill Ortiz
- keyboards – Lafayette Carthon Jr., Mike Chapman, Cold 187 um, B-Laid Back Edwards, Jimmy Jam, Trent Thomas
- mastering – Tom Coyne
- mixing – Ron Allaire, Chip Fu, Bob Fudjinski, Steve Hodge, R. Kelly, Tony Maserati, Peter Mokran, Organized Konfusion, David Rideau, Chris Trevett
- mixing engineer – Bob Fudjinski, Chris Trevett
- percussion – Terry Lewis
- performer(s) – Aaliyah, Tevin Campbell, Casual, Changing Faces, Extra Prolific, Hi-Five, R. Kelly, Mz. Kilo, Keith Murray, Nuttin' Nyce, Q-Tip, Raja Nee, Silk, Smooth, Souls of Mischief, Zhané
- piano – Lafayette Carthon Jr., Trent Thomas
- production – A+, Mike Chapman, Cold 187 um, K. Fingers, Fu-Schnickens, Jimmy Jam, R. Kelly, Terry Lewis, Howard Perl, Lyvio G., Organized Konfusion, Pimp C, Erick Sermon, Trent Thomas, Touré
- programming – Lance Alexander, Peter Mokran, Martin Stebbing, Jeff Taylor
- project coordination – Pamela Hughes, Stephanie Tudor
- rapping – R. Kelly
- remixing – R. Kelly
- scratching – Touré
- vocals – Tevin Campbell, Changing Faces, Jellybean Johnson, Terry Lewis, Ocee, Q-Tip, Raja Nee, Jeff Taylor
- vocals (background) – Robert "The Professor" Anderson, Cold 187 um, Stephanie Edwards, Steve Gray, Stephanie Huff, Raja Nee, Geraldine Sigler, Daniel Stokes
- vocoder programming – Lance Alexander
