= Eboni Foster =

American singer

- Born: Sacramento, California
- Genres: R&B; pop
- Occupation: singer
- Years active: 1993-1994, 1997-98, 2006
- Labels: Night Bird; Hendrix; MCA

Eboni Foster is an American R&B singer. Born in Sacramento, California, she became best known for her work as the lead singer of the '90s R&B group Nuttin' Nyce, and then for her solo single "Crazy for You", which became a top 40 hit on the US R&B chart in 1998. Foster went on to release her debut studio album, Just What You Want, the same year. The R&B/pop record drew favorable reviews and spawned a second single, "Everything You Do".

== Early life ==
Foster was born in Sacramento, California, and at a young age began singing in local talent show competitions, both in her hometown and in San Francisco, to the latter of which her family had moved when she was young. She cut her first demo recordings at the age of nine, and at the age of fourteen released her first solo recordings.

== Career ==
=== 1993-1997: Nuttin' Nyce and guest vocals ===
In 1993, shortly after the release of her debut solo recordings, Foster joined the Sacramento-based hip-hop girl group Nuttin' Nyce, becoming their lead singer following the departure of a former member. The group attained some success on music charts in the United States as well as the United Kingdom, with their debut single, "In My Nature", placing at number 89 on the Billboard Hot 100 in late August 1993. They also notched three top 100 entries on the UK Singles chart. The group released their debut studio album, Down 4 Whateva, in October 1994, and the title track gave the group a second Hot 100 entry, as well as receiving play on BET. After touring widely with the group, Foster departed in 1995. In 1998, Foster reflected to Billboard that she "never really saw (her)self in a group", feeling that she "always sang by (her)self".

Also in 1995, Foster provided guest vocals on the songs "Heavy in the Game" and “Can U Get Away” by Tupac Shakur from his third studio album, Me Against the World. Foster also contributed vocals to Shakur’s 1996 album All Eyez On Me on the track “Ratha Be Ni**a”, but was mistakenly credited as “Ebony”.

In 1997, Hendrix Records established a new imprint, Night Bird Records, for R&B artists. Songwriter and label president Troy E. Wright, upon hearing a cassette tape which Foster had recorded, signed Foster to the new imprint, making her its first signed artist.

=== 1998–present: Just What You Want and further success ===
In 1998, her debut solo single, "Crazy for You", was released to R&B radio stations, and commercially released in April. The single, which sampled James Brown's 1973 song "The Payback", was further promoted with a music video which was directed by Cirri Nottage, and went into rotation on The Box. The song also gave Foster her first solo entry on the Billboard Hot R&B/Hip-Hop Songs chart, on which it spent four months and ultimately peaked at number 32 in late May. It also reached number one on the Bubbling Under Hot 100 chart, an extension of the Hot 100, and peaked within the top 40 of the Adult R&B Airplay chart. A second single, "Everything You Do", did not enter the R&B or pop singles charts, but managed to peak at number 50 on the Hot R&B/Hip-Hop Singles Sales chart in May 1999.

On April 28, 1998, Foster released her debut solo studio album, Just What You Want. It was released by Hendrix records as both a compact disc and as a cassette. The record was generally classified as falling into the categories of R&B and pop, with rock, gospel, and jazz influences as well. Its lyrics have been described as describing "schoolgirl crushes and other loves", while Foster herself noted that much of the album focused on sex and romance. "Sweet Valley" was described as a stylistic departure for the album, with a more noticeably rock-inspired beat. The album also features a guest spot by rapper Sean Don. The song "Everything You Do" would go on to be remixed by Mark Ronson and sampled in the song "Truly" by Sovereign and Cisko, while "Crazy for You" was sampled in the 1999 recording "Crazy (The Original 99 Lick)" by Seven Wonders.

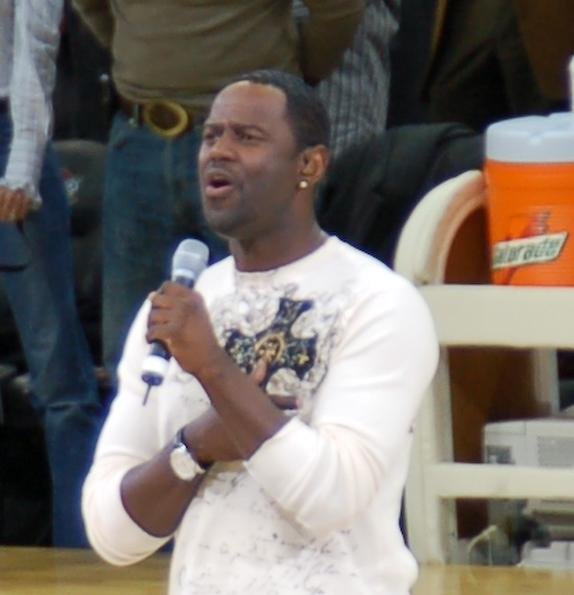
To promote her debut album, Foster performed as the opening act on tour for artists such as Brian McKnight (above) and K-Ci & JoJo

Her label aimed to promote the album to the 12-24 demographic, with guest appearances on Nickelodeon and MTV shows, as well as plans to place her music in popular sitcoms such as Friends, and to place Foster in fashion ads. To further promote the album, Foster performed as the opening act for Brian McKnight and K-Ci & Jo-Jo on tour.

Upon its release, the album elicited a generally favorable response from contemporary music critics. Allmusic awarded the album three stars out of five, with critic Dave Connolly commending Foster's "nice voice" and singling out "Sweet Valley" as a highlight. Connolly, however, voiced concern that Foster's voice was better suited to backing vocals than lead ones, and accused some of the musical arrangements of falling into a "bland pop/R&B formula". Billboard also praised the album, praising her "ability to avoid the 'sound-alike' trap that so many other young artists fall into", concluding that the record's sole shortcoming is its backing tracks, which the publication deemed "monotonous" and not "always complementary to Foster's excellent vocals".

== Discography ==
=== Studio album ===
- Just What You Want (1998)

=== Singles ===
Title	Year	Peak chart positions			Album
Title	Year	US	US R&B/Hip-Hop	US Adult R&B	Album
"Crazy for You"	1997	101	32	38	Just What You Want
"Everything You Do"	1998	—	— (Note: "Everything You Do" did not enter the Hot R&B/Hip-Hop Songs chart; however, it peaked at number 50 on the Billboard Hot R&B/Hip-Hop Singles Sales chart.)	—	Just What You Want

=== Guest appearances ===
- "Heavy in the Game" (from the 2Pac album Me Against the World) (1995)

“Ratha Be Ya Ni**a” (from the 2Pac album “All Eyez On Me”) (1996)
