= The Other Side (Gary Jenkins album) =

Studio album by Gary Jenkins
- Released: 2007
- Genre: Rhythm and blues
- Label: Anaphora

The Other Side is the debut solo album by American rhythm and blues musician Gary Jenkins. It was released through Anaphora Records in 2007.

== Track listing ==
1. "Interview"
2. "The Other Side"
3. "Friday Night"
4. "Ev'rybody Dreams"
5. "The Sound"
6. "So Sexy"
7. "Lovin' U"
8. "Dance With Me"
9. "Goes / Comes"
10. "So Free"
11. "Boojyghettoness"
12. "The Door"
13. "Moved On"
14. "Change Gone Come"
15. "One & Only"
16. "U Keep On"
