= They Like It Slow =

1997 single by H-Town

Single by H-Town

from the album Ladies Edition, Woman's World
- B-side: "Jezebel"
- Released: September 23, 1997
- Genre: R&B
- Length: 4:39
- Label: Relativity
- Songwriter(s): Dino Conner, Shazam Conner

H-Town singles chronology
"A Thin Line Between Love & Hate" (1996)	"They Like It Slow" (1997)	"Knockin Your Heels" (2009)

"They Like It Slow" is a song performed by H-Town, issued as the only single from their third album Ladies Edition, Woman's World. The song was written by group members Dino and Shazam Conner, and it was the last song the group released before Dino Conner was killed in a car accident. The song is also the group's last entry to date on the Billboard Hot 100, peaking at #35 in 1997.

== Charts ==
=== Weekly charts ===
Chart (1997)	Peak position
US Billboard Hot 100	35
US Hot R&B/Hip-Hop Songs (Billboard)	12

=== Year-end charts ===
Chart (1997)	Position
US Hot R&B/Hip-Hop Songs (Billboard)	97
Chart (1998)	Position
US Hot R&B/Hip-Hop Songs (Billboard)	89
