= Down 4 Whateva =

Single by Nuttin' Nyce

from the album Down 4 Whateva and A Low Down Dirty Shame (soundtrack)
- B-side: "Behind Closed Doors"
- Released: October 12, 1994
- Recorded: 1994
- Length: 4:51
- Label: Jive
- Songwriter(s): L. Campbell; N. Hooper; S. Law; O. Ponder; B. Romeo; L. Wallace; C. Wheeler
- Producer(s): Art & Rhythm

Nuttin' Nyce singles chronology
"Down 4 Whateva" (1994)	"Nasty Girl" (1994)

A Low Down Dirty Shame singles chronology
""Down 4 Whateva"" (1994)	""Get the Girl, Grab the Money and Run"" (1994)

"Down 4 Whateva" is a song by American girl group Nuttin' Nyce. The song, which was recorded for the group's debut album of the same name, was released as the first promotional single for the soundtrack to the 1994 film A Low Down Dirty Shame.

The chorus includes the refrain from "Back to Life (However Do You Want Me)" by Soul II Soul.

== Track listing ==
12", 33 1/3 RPM, Vinyl (Promo)

1. "Down 4 Whateva" (LP Version) - 4:50
2. "Down 4 Whateva" (Mr. Lee's Remix) - 6:05
3. "Down 4 Whateva" (LP Instrumental) - 4:50
4. "Down 4 Whateva" (Mr. Lee's Remix Instrumental) - 6:05

CD (Promo)

1. "Down 4 Whateva" (Radio Edit) - 4:20
2. "Down 4 Whateva" (LP Version) - 4:52
3. "Down 4 Whateva" (Mr. Lee's Remix) - 6:02

== Personnel ==
Information taken from Discogs.

- additional production – Mr. Lee, Wayne Williams
- engineering – Stephen George, Adam Kudzin, Chris Trevett
- instruments – K. Fingers
- mastering – Tom Coyne
- production – Art & Rhythm
- remixing – Mr. Lee
- writing – L. Campbell, N. Hooper, S. Law, O. Ponder, B. Romeo, L. Wallace, C. Wheeler

== Chart performance ==
Chart (1994)	Peak position
U.S. Billboard Hot 100	92
U.S. Hot Dance Music/Maxi-Singles Sales	38
U.S. Hot R&B/Hip-Hop Singles & Tracks	43
