= Always and Forever (Silk album) =

Studio album by Silk
- Released: October 17, 2006
- Length: 47:55
- Label: Shanachie

Silk chronology
The Best of Silk (2004)	Always and Forever (2006)	Quiet Storm (2016)

Always and Forever is the sixth studio album by Silk. It was released by Shanachie Records on October 17, 2006 in the United States. The album includes covers tracks like Switch's "There'll Never Be", The System's "Don't Disturb This Groove" and Shalamar's "A Night to Remember," and traditional R&B productions of Prince's "Adore", and Rod Temperton's "Secret Garden (Sweet Seduction Suite)."

== Critical reception ==
Professional ratings
Review scores
Source	Rating
AllMusic	4/5 stars

AllMusic editor Jonathan Widran rated the album four out of five stars. He noted that "keeping the spotlight on those million dollar harmonies, Silk pays its best homage when mixing contemporary funk rhythms with creative harmonic mixtures (including cool vocal percussion textures) [...] but they're also dynamite on traditional R&B productions [...] This exciting disc isn't about making a comeback, it's about showing love for the music that inspired Silk's heyday in the first place."

== Track listing ==
Always and Forever track listing
No.	Title	Length
1.	"There'll Never Be"	4:35
2.	"Adore"	4:24
3.	"Always and Forever"	6:07
4.	"Don't Disturb This Groove"	4:56
5.	"Nite and Day"	4:54
6.	"Sideshow"	4:02
7.	"The Lady in My Life"	5:15
8.	"A Night to Remember"	3:39
9.	"The Secret Garden (Sweet Seduction Suite)"	5:52
10.	"Two Occasions"	4:35

== Charts ==
Chart performance for Always and Forever
Chart (2006)	Peak position
US Top R&B/Hip-Hop Albums (Billboard)	23

== Release history ==
Always and Forever release history
Region	Date	Format	Label	Ref(s)
United States	October 17, 2006	CD; digital download	Shanachie	
