= Corwin Hawkins =

American actor (1965–1994)

- Born: Corwin Anthony Hawkins; March 12, 1965; Houston, Texas, U.S.
- Died: August 5, 1994 (aged 29); Dallas, Texas
- Other name: Amazing Grace
- Occupations: Comedian; actor; female impersonator
- Years active: 1979–1994

Corwin Hawkins (March 12, 1965 – August 5, 1994) was an American actor, comedian, and female impersonator. He also performed under a drag queen persona named Amazing Grace. Hawkins is most known for his role as Wayman Harrington in the 1994 action comedy film A Low Down Dirty Shame. He died prior to the film's release due to AIDS-related pneumonia on August 5, 1994.

== Early life ==
Corwin Anthony Hawkins was born on March 12, 1965, Houston, Texas, to Joyce Mae Hilaire Hawkins and Wilbert Hawkins Sr. He graduated from St. Peter's Catholic High School in Houston, Texas, in 1982.

== Career ==
In 1979, he created a drag queen persona named Amazing Grace, inspired by Jamaican singer-model Grace Jones. He began performing in nightclubs throughout Texas. In January 1986, he began regularly performing at The Old Plantation nightclub in El Paso, Texas. In July 1991, he entered the Miss Gay Texas pageant and became the first runner up.

In July 1992, he appeared on the fourth episode of season four's Def Comedy Jam in his Amazing Grace persona. Later that month, he re-entered the Miss Gay Texas pageant and was crowned the winner. He later entered Entertainer of the Year (EOY) pageant and won in the Female Impersonator category in Louisville, Kentucky. In the same year, he performed stand-up on BET's ComicView. He made his acting debut as Wayman Harrington, a role originally meant for RuPaul, in the 1994 action comedy film A Low Down Dirty Shame. Hawkins had attracted the attention of a producer who worked with Keenen Ivory Wayans and subsequently auditioned him for the role. Hawkins was originally cast in the 1996 film Don't Be a Menace to South Central While Drinking Your Juice in the Hood and was attending the film's rehearsal periods, but he was forced to withdraw from the film after his illness grew. He was also in preparation to co-star on sketch comedy television series In Living Color.

== Death ==
Hawkins died from AIDS-related pneumonia on August 5, 1994 at Baylor University Medical Center in Dallas, Texas. His funeral was held at St. Benedict's Catholic Church on August 10, 1994. Hawkins was later laid to rest in Houston Memorial Gardens cemetery in Pearland, Texas. The film A Low Down Dirty Shame, released on November 23, 1994, was dedicated to his memory. A tribute show titled Drag Queens of Comedy: A Tribute to Amazing Grace was held at Hotel Dallas Love Field on September 30 in Dallas.

== Filmography ==
=== Film ===
Year	Title	Role
1994	A Low Down Dirty Shame	Wayman Harrington

=== Television ===
Year	Title	Role	Notes
1992	Def Comedy Jam	Himself	Season 4, Episode 4
1992	ComicView	Himself	
