= Nuttin' Nyce =

American contemporary R&B group

- Origin: Sacramento, California
- Genres: R&B; hip hop; hip hop soul; new jack swing
- Years active: 1992–1996
- Labels: Pocketown Records; Jive
- Past members: LaTeece "Teece" Wallace; Onnie Ponder; Eboni Foster; Liz Burnett

Nuttin' Nyce was an American girl group from Sacramento, California that formed in 1992. They signed to Pocketown Records and released an album and five singles (via Jive Records) before splitting up in 1996.

== History ==
The trio originally consisted of LaTeece "Teece" Wallace, Onnie Ponder & Liz Burnett. Wallace was previously a member of the dance trio Get Busy Girls. They were formerly members of the five-piece group Attitude, but after losing two members became Nuttin' Nyce. Burnett was replaced in 1993 by Eboni Foster, who herself left in 1994. They were spotted by Pocketown Records A&R man Rodney Ellis at a club in Los Angeles and signed to the label as its first act.

Their debut album Down 4 Whateva was released in 1993 along with their first single, "In My Nature", which reached number 83 on the Billboard Hot 100. Their album was described by the Chicago Tribune as "full of sexual innuendo and lascivious posturing", and by The Sun Reporter as "stacked with passionate ballads, boomin' beats and fresh rap interludes". Second single "Down 4 Whateva" was released in 1994, giving them their biggest UK hit, peaking at number 62 in the UK Singles Chart. In the same year, a collaboration with Hi-Five, "What Can I Say To You (To Justify My Love)", was released.

"Nasty Girl", a version of Prince-written hit for the group Vanity 6, followed in 1995, and was released with two versions of the track, the album version which was hip hop influenced, and a single mix which had a more uptempo house/dance feel.

Their final single, "Froggy Style", was released later in 1995, and gave them their highest chart appearance, peaking at number 63 on the Hot 100.

The group were featured in the soundtrack of four films; "Froggy Style" was used in High School High, "Down 4 Whateva" was used in A Low Down Dirty Shame, "Wandering Eyes" in Sister Act 2: Back in the Habit. and "In My Nature" in Ghost In The Machine.

The group had officially disbanded in 1996 due to pursuing individual solo careers.

== Discography ==
=== Albums ===
Title	Album details
Down 4 Whateva	Released: 12 October 1993; Re-released: 27 June 1995; Format: CD, Cassette, Vinyl; Label: Jive; US R&B Albums no. 34

=== Singles ===
- "In My Nature" (1993), Jive - US no. 83
- "Down 4 Whateva" (1994), Jive - US no. 92, UK no. 62
- "What Can I Say to You (To Justify My Love)" (1994), Jive - Hi-Five and Nuttin' NYCe
- "Nasty Girl" (1995), Jive - US Dance/Club Play Songs no. 39
- "Froggy Style" (1995), Jive - US no. 63, US R&B/Hip-Hop Songs no. 25, UK no. 68
