= Cold Blooded (song) =

Single by Rick James

from the album Cold Blooded
- B-side: "Cold Blooded (Instrumental)"
- Released: July 5, 1983
- Studio: Joint Recording Studio, Buffalo, New York
- Genre: Electro-funk, synth-pop
- Length: 5:59 (album version); 4:19 (single version)
- Label: Gordy
- Songwriter: Rick James
- Producer: Rick James

Rick James singles chronology
"Teardrops" (1983)	"Cold Blooded" (1983)	"U Bring the Freak Out" (1983)

"Cold Blooded" is a funk song written and recorded by Rick James in 1983. James wrote the song about his relationship with actress Linda Blair.

== Background and recording ==
Rick James began dating Linda Blair in the fall of 1982. In early 1983, Blair became pregnant and underwent an abortion. James, unaware of the pregnancy until Blair informed him after the procedure, was hurt. He wrote "Cold Blooded" about Blair. "It was about how Linda could freeze my blood," he wrote in his memoir.

During one of Blair's visits to James' home in Buffalo, New York, he took her to his recording studio. She was interested in learning how to write music so he fired up his synthesizer and absentmindedly began noodling with the keys and came up with the bass line. Running with the idea, he played all the instruments on the track. Synth-based, it was a departure from James' previous guitar-based, horns-laced sides. He utilized the Roland TR series of drum machines which were dominant on the '80s-era Jimmy Jam-and-Terry Lewis-produced hits of The S.O.S. Band.

Released as the first single from the album of the same name, "Cold Blooded" spent six weeks at number one on the Billboard R&B Singles chart and reached number 40 on the Hot 100.

== Covers and sampling ==
In 1999, the song was covered by American rapper Ol' Dirty Bastard and included on his album Nigga Please. The song was sampled by TLC on their third album FanMail on the interlude "Whispering Playa"; the sample was later removed on future versions of the album and replaced with a sample of the group's own song "U in Me".

== Chart performance ==
Chart (1983)	Peak position
US Billboard Hot 100	40
US Billboard R&B	1
US Billboard Dance	17
UK Singles (OCC)	93
