= Imitations of Life =

Studio album by H-Town
- Released: September 27, 2004
- Recorded: 2001–2002
- Genre: R&B, hip hop
- Length: 78:39
- Label: BCD Music, H-Town Music
- Producer: Pat Rodriguez; Gold Finger; Dino Conner

H-Town chronology
Ladies Edition, Woman's World (1997)	Imitations of Life (2004)	Child Support (2015)

Imitations of Life is the fourth studio album by American R&B/pop group, H-Town. It was released independently on September 27, 2004, on H-Town Music. This was the final album to feature the group's lead singer, Keven Conner (better known as Dino), who died on January 28, 2003, a year prior to the album's release.

== Track listing ==
1. "Nothin in Common (Intro)" - 0:53
2. "Nothin in Common" - 4:36
3. "Let's Just Make It" (featuring Crystal Conner) - 5:29
4. "My Pink Sky" - 5:16
5. "Back Home to Lovin' You" - 3:35
6. "Strip Club Junkies" - 3:22
7. "The Thrill Is Gone" - 3:27
8. "Here We Go Again" - 3:58
9. "Cryin' Out My Heart to You" - 6:05
10. "Your Body (Interlude)" - 1:48
11. "Feel Like Fire" - 3:54
12. "Sex Dance" - 4:49
13. "More Ways to Love a Woman" - 4:09
14. "Champagne Bubble Bath & Me" - 4:02
15. "The Day I Die" - 5:05
16. "Stop Living in Color" - 3:45
17. "Unpredictable" - 3:15
18. "She's Actin' Bad" (featuring CiChe, MC Quake & Big Mike) - 4:09
19. "Slow and Easy" (featuring Zapp) - 2:56
20. "Spank Me" - 3:58

== Personnel ==
- Composer – Keven "Dino" Conner
- Composer – Solomon "Shazam" Conner
- Guest Artist – Big Mike
- Guest Artist – M.C. Quake,
- Guest Artist – Roger Troutman
- Guest Artist – CiChe
- Background vocals – Black Friday
- Engineer, Mixing – Gerry Gallegos (Gerry G).
- Mixing, Producer – Gold Finger
- Composer, Producer – Pat Rodriguez

credits are from album liner notes.
