= Beggin' After Dark =

Studio album by H-Town
- Released: November 8, 1994
- Recorded: 1993–1994
- Studios: Hot Dog Studios & Digital Services (Houston)
- Genres: R&B, new jack swing
- Length: 71:21
- Label: Luke
- Producers: Bishop "Stick Burrell; Keven "Dino" Conner; Luther Campbell (exe. producer)

H-Town chronology
Fever for Da Flavor (1993)	Beggin' After Dark (1994)	Ladies Edition (1997)

Singles from Beggin' After Dark
- 1. "Much Feelin' (And It Tastes Great)" Released: June 20, 1994; 2. "Back Seat (Wit No Sheets)" Released: September 30, 1994; 3. "One Night Gigolo" Released: December 21, 1994; 4. "Emotions" Released: March 17, 1995; 5. "Full Time" Released: May 25, 1995; 6. "Baby I Love Ya" Released: August 1, 1995

Beggin' After Dark is the second studio album by American R&B group H-Town, released November 8, 1994, on Luke Records. The album showcases a more sensual romantic sound on ballads such as "Much Feelin' (And It Tastes Great)", "One Night Gigolo", "Full Time", and "Baby I Love Ya" featuring Roger Troutman. The first single “Back Seat (Wit No Sheets)" peaked at #18 while the album's second single "Emotions" peaked at #11 on Billboard's Top R&B Songs chart.

== Track listing ==
1. "H-Town Intro '94" (Bishop "Stick" Burrell) – 2:31
2. "Sex Bowl" (Keven "Dino" Conner, Solomon "Shazam" Conner, Bishop "Stick" Burrell) – 5:13
3. "One Night Gigolo" (Keven "Dino" Conner, Solomon "Shazam" Conner, Bishop "Stick" Burrell) – 5:29
4. "Prelude to Emotion" (Keven "Dino" Conner, Darryl "G.I." Jackson, Solomon "Shazam" Conner) – 1:36
5. "Emotions" (Keven "Dino" Conner, Darryl "G.I." Jackson, Solomon "Shazam" Conner) – 5:57
6. "Cruisin' fo' Honeys" (Keven "Dino" Conner, Mark "G.I." Jackson, Solomon "Shazam" Conner, Bishop "Stick" Burrell) – 2:21
7. "Full Time" (Keven "Dino" Conner, Darryl "G.I." Jackson, Solomon "Shazam" Conner) – 5:21
8. "1-900-CALL GI" (Darryl "G.I." Jackson) – 1:34
9. "Tumble & Rumble" (Keven "Dino" Conner, Solomon "Shazam" Conner, Bishop "Stick" Burrell) – 6:02
10. "Much Feelin' (And It Tastes Great)" (Keven "Dino" Conner, Solomon "Shazam" Conner, Bishop "Stick" Burrell) – 5:23
11. "Beggin' After Dark" (Bishop "Stick" Burrell) – 1:46
12. "Indo Love" (Keven "Dino" Conner, Solomon "Shazam" Conner, Bishop "Stick" Burrell) – 4:45
13. "Back Seat (Wit No Sheets)" (Keven "Dino" Conner, Solomon "Shazam" Conner, Bishop "Stick" Burrell) – 4:45
14. "Buss One" (featuring Papa Reu) (Keven "Dino" Conner, Darryl "G.I." Jackson, Papi Reu, Solomon "Shazam" Conner) – 5:43
15. "Baby I Love Ya'" (featuring Roger Troutman) (Keven "Dino" Conner, Darryl "G.I." Jackson, Roger Troutman, Solomon "Shazam" Conner, Bishop "Stick" Burrell) – 5:51
16. "Sticky Lee Presley" (Bishop "Stick" Burrell) – 0:22
17. "Rockit Steady" (Keven "Dino" Conner, Darryl "G.I." Jackson, Solomon "Shazam" Conner) – 4:30
18. "The Last Record" (Bishop "Stick" Burrell) – 3:20

== Personnel ==
- Arranged By – Keven "Dino" Conner (tracks: 4 to 6, 9, 17)
- Arranged By, Mixed By – Bishop "Stick" Burrell (tracks: 1 to 4, 6 to 16, 18)
- Keyboard – Keven "Dino" Conner, Darryl "G.I." Jackson
- Guitar – Ron Johnson (tracks: 1, 9, 13, 17)
- Guitar – Carl Johnson tracks: 12)
- Engineer [Recording] – Bishop "Stick" Burrell, Brian "Bad Ass" Conner, Mike Vaughn
- Executive-Producer – Luther R. Campbell
- Mastered By – Mike Fuller
- Producer – Bishop "Stick" Burrell (tracks: 1 to 5, 6 to 16, 18), Keven "Dino" Conner (tracks: 5 to 7, 9, 17)

Credits from album liner notes

== Charts ==
=== Weekly charts ===
Chart (1994)	Peak position
US Billboard 200	98
US Top R&B/Hip-Hop Albums (Billboard)	21

=== Year-end charts ===
Chart (1995)	Position
US Top R&B/Hip-Hop Albums (Billboard)	52

=== Singles ===
Year	Single	Peak position	
Year	Single	US Pop	US R&B
1994	"Back Seat (Wit No Sheets)"	—	18
1995	"Emotions"	51	11

== Certifications ==
Region	Certification	Certified units/sales
United States (RIAA)	Gold	500,000^{^}
^{^} Shipments figures based on certification alone.
