= Knockin' Da Boots =

"Knockin' da Boots"

Single by H-Town

from the album Fever for da Flavor
- Released: March 11, 1993
- Genre: R&B
- Length: 5:29 (album version); 4:33 (single version)
- Label: Luke
- Songwriters: Keven Conner; Solomon Conner; Darryl Jackson
- Producers: Keven Conner; Solomon Conner; Darryl Jackson; Stick

H-Town singles chronology
| "You & Me" (1993) | "Knockin' da Boots" (1993) | "Lick U Up" (1993) |

Music video
- "Knockin' da Boots" on YouTube

"Knockin' da Boots" is a song by American R&B vocal group H-Town, released in March 1993, by Luke Records, as the debut single from their first album, Fever for da Flavor (1993). The song became one of the biggest R&B singles of 1993 according to the US Billboard charts, where it peaked at number three on the Hot 100 for seven weeks, as well as number four on the Cash Box Top 100. It also topped the Billboard Hot R&B chart for four weeks, helping win the band a Soul Train Music Award for Best R&B/Soul or Rap New Artist. The song was certified platinum by the Recording Industry Association of America and sold over 1.1 million copies. The song contains replayed elements of "Be Alright" by Zapp. The term "Knockin' da Boots" means to have "sexual intercourse" with one another. In a profile of distinguished lawyer Kristine A. Huskey, Marie Claire magazine reported that Huskey had appeared as a dancer in the song's music video while attending law school.

== Track listing ==
1. "Knockin' da Boots" (Album Version) 5:29
2. "Knockin' da Boots" (Single Version) 4:33
3. "Knockin' da Boots" (Instrumental) 5:29
4. "H-Town Bounce" (Album Version) 3:43
5. "H-Town Bounce" (Instrumental) 3:43

== Charts ==
=== Weekly charts ===
| Chart (1993) | Peak position |
|---|---|
| Australia (ARIA) | 95 |
| Canada Retail Singles (The Record) | 3 |
| Europe (European Dance Radio) | 3 |
| US Billboard Hot 100 | 3 |
| US Adult Pop Airplay (Billboard) | 34 |
| US Hot R&B/Hip-Hop Songs (Billboard) | 1 |
| US Maxi-Singles Sales (Billboard) | 14 |
| US R&B/Hip-Hop Airplay (Billboard) | 3 |
| US Rhythmic Airplay (Billboard) | 2 |
| US Cash Box Top 100 | 4 |

=== Year-end charts ===
| Chart (1993) | Position |
|---|---|
| US Billboard Hot 100 | 14 |
| US Hot R&B/Hip-Hop Songs (Billboard) | 2 |

== See also ==
- R&B number-one hits of 1993 (USA)
