= Freak Me =

1993 single by Silk

- US retail cassette single

Single by Silk

from the album Lose Control
- B-side: "Happy Days"
- Released: February 18, 1993
- Recorded: 1992
- Genre: R&B
- Length: 4:36
- Label: Keia; Elektra
- Songwriters: Keith Sweat; Roy Murray; Teno West
- Producers: Keith Sweat; T.H.

Silk singles chronology
"Happy Days" (1992)	"Freak Me" (1993)	"Girl U for Me/Lose Control" (1993)

"Freak Me" is a song by American R&B group Silk. It was released in February 1993 as the second single from their debut album, Lose Control (1992). It was co-written and co-produced by Keith Sweat, for whom Silk was a touring opening act. Tim Cameron, Jimmy Gates and Gary "Lil G" Jenkins sing lead on the song.

== Commercial performance ==
The song was the group's highest-charting hit single, reaching number-one on the Billboard Hot 100 for two weeks, and also spending ten weeks at number two. It also topped the Billboard Hot R&B Singles chart for eight weeks. It was certified platinum by the Recording Industry Association of America (RIAA) and sold over 1.3 million copies domestically.

The song was covered by Another Level, and their version reached No. 1 on the UK chart.

== Music video ==
Two versions of the music video for "Freak Me" were produced: the first was directed by Bronwen Hughes, while the second was directed by Lionel C. Martin.

== Track listing ==
- US 7" Vinyl single"

A1 "Freak Me" (LP Version) [featuring Teno West] – 4:35
B "Happy Days" – 4:06

- US 12" Vinyl single"

A1 "Freak Me" (Remix) [featuring Teno West] – 4:55
A2 "Freak Me" (Jeep Beat Mix) [featuring Teno West] – 4:55
B1 "Freak Me" (LP Version) [featuring Teno West] – 4:35
B2 "Happy Days" (Instrumental) – 3:45

- Europe CD Maxi-Single
1. "Freak Me" (LP Version) – 4:35
2. "Freak Me" (Remix) [featuring Teno West] – 4:55
3. "Freak Me" (Jeep Beat Mix) [featuring Teno West] – 4:55

Other versions

- "Freak Me" (Extended Version) – 5:38
- "Freak Me" (12" Remix) – 4:57

== Credits ==
- Co-producer – T.H.
- Producer – Keith Sweat
- Writer – Keith Sweat
- Co-producer – T.H.
- Rap – Teno West
- Producer – Alton Wokie Stewart (tracks: B2)
- Remix – Jermaine Dupri (tracks: B2), Carl Heilbron (tracks: A1, A2), Keith Sweat (tracks: A1, A2)
- Engineer – Phil Tan

== Charts ==
=== Weekly charts ===
Chart (1993)	Peak position
Australia (ARIA)	3
Canada Top Singles (RPM)	43
Europe (European Dance Radio)	8
Netherlands (Dutch Top 40)	30
Netherlands (Single Top 100)	42
New Zealand (Recorded Music NZ)	9
UK Singles (OCC)	46
US Billboard Hot 100	1
US Hot R&B/Hip-Hop Singles & Tracks (Billboard)	1

=== Year-end charts ===
Chart (1993)	Position
Australia (ARIA)	15
New Zealand (Recorded Music NZ)	43
US Billboard Hot 100	5
US Hot R&B/Hip-Hop Songs (Billboard)	4
US Cash Box Top 100	7

=== Decade-end charts ===
Chart (1990–1999)	Position
US Billboard Hot 100	32

=== Certifications ===
Region	Certification	Certified units/sales
Australia (ARIA)	Platinum	70,000^{^}
New Zealand (RMNZ)	Gold	15,000^{‡}
United States (RIAA)	Platinum	1,000,000^{^}
^{^} Shipments figures based on certification alone.^{‡} Sales+streaming figures based on certification alone.

== Another Level version ==
"Freak Me"

Single by Another Level

from the album Another Level
- B-side: "Whatever You Want"
- Released: 6 July 1998
- Recorded: 1998
- Genre: R&B
- Length: 3:39 (C&J radio edit); 4:56 (C&J mix/album version)
- Label: Northwestside
- Songwriters: Keith Sweat; Roy Murray; Anthony Teno West Johnson
- Producers: Fitzgerald Scott; Cutfather & Joe

Another Level singles chronology
"Be Alone No More" (1998)	"Freak Me" (1998)	"Guess I Was a Fool" (1998)

The song was covered by British boy band Another Level in 1998. It was released on 6 July 1998 as the second single from the band's self-titled debut album. This version reached number one on the UK Singles Chart, overtaking Billie's "Because We Want To". It was produced by Fitzgerald Scott, Cutfather and Joe; it was the seventeenth biggest-selling boy band single of the 1990s in the UK, selling over 415,000 copies.

=== Track listing ===
- UK CD single (1)
1. "Freak Me" (Cutfather & Joe Radio Edit)
2. "Whatever You Want"
3. "Freak Me" (Club Asylum Classic Vocal Mix)
- UK CD single (2)
1. "Freak Me" (Blacksmith R&B Radio Rub)
2. "Freak Me" (Blacksmith Put It There Mix)
3. "Freak Me" (Blacksmith Skate And Roll Mix)
- German CD single
1. "Freak Me" (C&J Radio Edit) — 3:39
2. "Freak Me" (Blacksmith R&B Rub) — 6:09
- German CD maxi-single
1. "Freak Me" (C&J Radio Edit)
2. "Whatever You Want"
3. "Freak Me" (Club Asylum Radio Edit)
4. "Freak Me" (Blacksmith R&B Rub)
5. "Freak Me" (C&J Mix)
6. "Freak Me" (Rich Boogie Remix)

=== Credits and personnel ===
- Production – Fitzgerald Scott
- Engineering – Alex Nesmith
- Programming – Alex Nesmith
- Co-production – Cutfather and Joe
- Keyboards, programming – Joe Belmaati
- Rhodes piano – Tue Röh
- Engineering – Bernard Löhr

=== Charts ===
Chart (1998)	Peak position
Australia (ARIA)	43
Belgium (Ultratop 50 Flanders)	15
Europe (Eurochart Hot 100)	11
Europe (European Hit Radio)	34
France (SNEP)	91
Germany (GfK)	75
Ireland (IRMA)	10
Netherlands (Dutch Top 40)	2
Netherlands (Single Top 100)	2
Netherlands Airplay (Music & Media)	7
New Zealand (Recorded Music NZ)	12
Norway (VG-lista)	10
Scottish Singles Sales (Official Charts)	13
Sweden (Sverigetopplistan)	11
UK Singles (Official Charts)	1
UK Airplay (Music Week)	10
UK Hip Hop/R&B (Official Charts)	1

=== Year-end charts ===
Chart (1998)	Position
Belgium (Ultratop Flanders)	95
Netherlands (Dutch Top 40)	17
Netherlands (Single Top 100)	20
Sweden (Sverigetopplistan)	55
UK Singles (OCC)	28
UK Urban (Music Week)	29

=== Certifications ===
Region	Certification	Certified units/sales
Netherlands (NVPI)	Gold	50,000^{^}
New Zealand (RMNZ)	Gold	5,000^{*}
United Kingdom (BPI)	Platinum	600,000^{‡}
^{*} Sales figures based on certification alone.^{^} Shipments figures based on certification alone.^{‡} Sales+streaming figures based on certification alone.

== See also ==
- List of number-one R&B singles of 1993 (U.S.)
- List of Billboard Hot 100 number-one singles of 1993
- List of UK Singles Chart number ones of the 1990s
