= Ladies Edition, Woman's World =

Studio album by H-Town
- Released: October 28, 1997
- Recorded: 1996–1997
- Genres: R&B, hip-hop
- Length: 76:59
- Label: Relativity
- Producer: Keven "Dino" Conner

H-Town chronology
Beggin' After Dark (1994)	Ladies Edition, Woman's World (1997)	Imitation of Life (2004)

Professional ratings
Review scores
Source	Rating
Allmusic	4/5 stars
Vibe	(favorable)

Ladies Edition, Woman's World is the third studio album by American R&B group H-Town. It was released October 28, 1997 on Relativity Records. Ladies Edition is the group first release signed to the label, after releasing their first two albums on Luther Campbell's label, Luke Records. Hip-hop-influenced ballads and slow jams like "Ways to Treat a Woman," "A Natural Woman," and the single "They Like It Slow" have a more respectful tone, and the group is more conscious toward women with this album.

This was the final album released in Dino's lifetime.

== Commercial reception ==
After the lead single "They Like It Slow" became a hit and peak to #12 on Billboard Top R&B Songs, Ladies Edition gained further popularity in the U.S., and the album quickly climbed to #12 on Billboard Top R&B Albums chart.

== Track listing ==
1. "Woman's Anthem Intro" - 2:10
2. "Don't Sleep on the Female" - 2:54
3. "Toon Girl" (Dino Conner) - 3:04
4. "Die for You" - 3:30
5. "Married Man" (Dino Conner) - 4:39
6. "Beggars Can't Be Choosey" (Deja) - 4:05
7. "Ways to Treat a Woman" - 3:46
8. "Don't Hold Back the Rain" - 3:49
9. "I Sleep U I Wear U" - 4:12
10. "They Like It Slow" - 4:36
11. "Special Kinda Fool" - 4:07
12. "A Natural Woman" - 5:50
13. "Shoot 'Em Up" (Dino Conner) - 4:51
14. "Jezebel" - 3:45
15. "Woman's World" - 3:46
16. "Mindtaker" (Shazam Conner) - 4:40
17. "Visions in My Mind" - 4:01
18. "Julie Rain" - 4:15
19. "Woman's Anthem" - 4:50

== Personnel ==
- Composer – Keven "Dino" Conner
- Composer – Solomon "Shazam" Conner
- Guest Artist – Roger Troutman
- Guitar – Brian Conner, [Additional Guitar] Randy Washington
- Bass – Gary Williams
- Producer, Arranger, Composer, Multi-Instruments, Mixing, Programming – Keven "Dino" Conner
- Engineer – Micah Harrison, Dave Huron
- Engineer, Mixer – Charles Nasser
- Composer, Guest Artist, Producer – Deja (tracks: 6)
- Producer – Keven "Dino" Conner

Production from album liner notes.

== Charts ==
Chart (1997)	Peak position
US Billboard 200	53
US Billboard Top R&B Albums	12

=== Singles ===
Year	Single	Peak position	
Year	Single	US Pop	US R&B
1997	"They Like It Slow"	35	12
