= Cold Blooded (Rick James album) =

Studio album by Rick James
- Released: August 5, 1983
- Recorded: 1983
- Studio: Joint Recording Studio, Buffalo, New York
- Length: 39:48
- Label: Gordy
- Producer: Rick James

Rick James chronology
Throwin' Down (1982)	Cold Blooded (1983)	Reflections (1984)

Singles from Cold Blooded
- 1. "Cold Blooded" Released: July 5, 1983; 2. "U Bring the Freak Out" Released: 1983; 3. "Ebony Eyes" Released: November 14, 1983

Professional ratings
Review scores
Source	Rating
AllMusic	2.5/5 stars

Cold Blooded is the seventh studio album by American singer-songwriter and musician Rick James, released on the Gordy Records imprint of Motown Records. The title track was written with actress Linda Blair in mind, whom James was dating at the time.

== Track listing ==
All tracks composed and arranged by Rick James.

Side A

1. "U Bring the Freak Out"
2. "Cold Blooded"
3. "Ebony Eyes" (featuring Smokey Robinson)
4. "1, 2, 3 (U, Her and Me)"

Side B

1. "Doin' It"
2. "New York Town"
3. "P.I.M.P. the S.I.M.P." (featuring Grandmaster Flash)
4. "Tell Me (What You Want)" (featuring Billy Dee Williams)
5. "Unity"

2014 digital remaster bonus track

10. "U Bring the Freak Out" (12" Extended Mix) - 7:53

2014 Complete Motown Albums bonus tracks

10. "Cold Blooded" (12" Instrumental) - 5:53
11. "U Bring the Freak Out" (12" Extended Mix) - 7:53
12. "U Bring the Freak Out" (Instrumental) - 6:53

== Personnel ==
- Daniel LeMelle, Rick James - horn arrangements
- Johnny Lee - art direction
- LaMorris Payne, Levi Ruffin Jr., Rick James, William Rhinehart - backing vocals
- Allen McGrier, Rick James - bass
- Nate Hughes - bongos
- Lino Reyes - congas
- Ronald Byrd - production coordinator
- Jerry Rainey - cowbell
- Tom Flye - engineer
- Bill Waldman, Carolyn Blades, Ralph Sutton, Tom Swift - assistant engineer
- Greg "Bubbles" Levias, Levi Ruffin Jr., Rick James - keyboards, synthesizer
- Tom McDermott - lead guitar
- Lead Vocals, Piano, Drums, Guitar, Timpani – Rick James
- Mastered By – Bernie Grundman
- Percussion – Lino Reyes, Nate Hughes, Rick James
- Photography By – Ron Slenzak
- Saxophone – Emilio Castillo, William Rhinehart
- Trombone – John Ervin
- Trumpet – Cliff Ervin, Greg Adams, LaMorris Payne

== Charts ==
=== Weekly charts ===
Chart (1983)	Peak position
US Billboard 200	16
US Top R&B/Hip-Hop Albums (Billboard)	1

=== Year-end charts ===
Chart (1983)	Position
US Top R&B/Hip-Hop Albums (Billboard)	5
Chart (1984)	Position
US Top R&B/Hip-Hop Albums (Billboard)	26

== Certifications ==
Region	Certification	Certified units/sales
United States (RIAA)	Gold	500,000^{^}
^{^} Shipments figures based on certification alone.
