= René Hicks =

African American comedian and actress (1956–2026)

- Born: Marian Hicks; June 28, 1956; San Francisco, California, U.S.
- Died: July 27, 2026 (aged 70)
- Website: Official website at the Wayback Machine (archived 2012-02-04)

René Hicks (June 28, 1956 – July 27, 2026) was an American actress and comedienne. She appeared on Comedy Central's Comedy Central Presents and in numerous college shows. Hicks was twice named NACA Comedy Entertainer of the Year, in 1995 and 1997. She was also an accountant, as well as a college athlete. Her television credits included guest appearances on Hangin' with Mr. Cooper and Midnight Caller.

Hicks died on July 27, 2026, at the age of 70.

== Television ==
- Stand-Up Spotlight (TV Series documentary) (1988)
- Midnight Caller (TV Series) (1989)
- 1/2 Hour Comedy Hour (TV Series) (1990)
- Hangin' with Mr. Cooper (TV Series) (1994)
- Best of Comedy Live (TV Movie) (1995)
- The Daily Show (TV Series) (1998)
- Renee Hicks (1998)
- Comedy Central Presents (TV Series documentary) (2000)
- Rene Hicks (2000) (2000)
- The World Comedy Tour: Melbourne 2002 (TV Special) (2002)
- Coming Out Party (Video) (2003)
- Out on the Edge (TV Special documentary) (2004)
- Laughing Matters... More! (Documentary) (2006)

== Filmography ==
- A Low Down Dirty Shame (1994)
- Coming Out Party (2003)
- Out on the Edge (2004)

== Discography ==
- Let's Roll (Stand Up! Records, 2005)
