= H-Town (group) =

American contemporary R&B group

- Also known as: The Gents
- Origin: Houston, Texas, U.S.
- Genres: R&B; hip hop; new jack swing
- Years active: 1991–present
- Labels: Luke; Relativity; H-Town Music; Spectra
- Members: Solomon "Shazam" Conner; Darryl "G.I." Jackson
- Past members: Keven "Dino" Conner

H-Town is an American R&B vocal group from Houston, Texas, United States. H-Town was founded in 1990 by brothers Keven "Dino" Conner (1974 – 2003), Solomon "Shazam" Conner and their friend Darryl "G.I." Jackson. H-Town recorded three hits during the early to mid–1990s.

== History ==
=== Formation ===
The group grew up together in Houston's 3rd Ward neighborhood located on the south side of the city. While attending Jack Yates High School, in 1991, Keven and Solomon Conner formed a band with Darryl Jackson. They were known as "The Gents" and recorded their first album, It's No Dream, with producer Phil Blackmon. Shazam was chosen as lead singer at the time of recording this album, which featured the ballad "A Time for Us". The album was released locally and was not a huge commercial success. The group continued recording and performed at talent shows and plays when a local producer sent their demo tape to 2 Live Crew rapper and record label executive Luther "Luke" Campbell. After an impromptu audition, Campbell signed the group to his label, Luke Records. Producer Bishop "Stick" Burrell became their producer and positioned Dino as lead singer, seeing his potential and rare voice as the formula for success in the group and built his sound around him. They took the name of the group, "H-Town", from the local nickname for the city of Houston, Texas, in which they grew up.

== Early career ==
=== Fever for Da Flavor (1993) ===
H-Town's debut album Fever for Da Flavor was released on April 15, 1993. The group achieved hit status in the United States with "Knockin' Da Boots", which became H-Town's biggest hit and also their signature song. "Boots" was a #1 hit on the R&B charts, and peaked at #3 on the Billboard Hot 100. "Lick U Up", the band's follow-up single, peaked at #21. They signed on as a part of the 1993 Coca-Cola Summer Fest tour, which included fellow R&B hit groups Shai, SWV, Jade, Naughty by Nature, Silk and also included multi-platinum rap artist LL Cool J. In 1994, H-Town won the Soul Train Music Award for Best New Artist. They also appeared on the Above the Rim soundtrack with their single "Part Time Lover", which was produced by DeVante Swing of Jodeci. It peaked at #9 on the R&B Charts. Also in 1994, the trio appeared in the group Black Men United, which appeared and alongside Silk, Portrait, Boyz II Men and others recording hit the single "U Will Know" for the Jason's Lyric soundtrack.

=== Beggin' After Dark (1994), Ladies Edition, Woman's World (1997) ===
In late 1993, H-Town returned to the studio to record their second album Beggin' After Dark . It was released on November 8, 1994. The most popular single from this album was "Emotions". It became a #11 hit on the Billboard R&B chart and reached #51 on the Hot 100. Other tracks from the album included "Back Seat (Wit No Sheets)", "Full Time", "One Night Gigolo", "Tumble & Rumble", "Buss One", featuring reggae singer Papa Reu, and "Baby I Love Ya" featuring Roger Troutman. By the time H-Town returned to the studio to record Ladies Edition, they had undergone some changes. They recorded a cover version of The Persuaders' "A Thin Line Between Love and Hate" featuring Shirley Murdock for the 1996 film of the same name. The song became H-Town's first Top 40 pop hit in three years, peaking at #37. They then cut ties with Luther Campbell, underwent a spiritual awakening of sorts, and became more aware of women's issues on their third album Ladies Edition, Woman's World. It was released on October 28, 1997. The album's general theme centers on a man's penitence for his past transgressions with his woman, a theme conveyed in songs such as "Don't Sleep on the Female", "Julie Rain" (an account of spousal abuse), and "Jezebel". According to the liner notes, the album was dedicated to Nicole Brown Simpson and "all the women of the world." Twenty national women's telephone helplines were also listed on the back cover. Their one and only single from the album, "They Like It Slow" was released on September 23, 1997, and peaked at #35 on the Billboard Hot 100.

=== Later career ===
Dino Conner, age 28, was killed along with his girlfriend in an automobile accident on January 28, 2003. In 2004, the band self-released Imitations of Life. The surviving members continued to record and tour into the 2010s, collaborating with Pretty Ricky and Jodeci on a 2010 single "Knockin' Your Heels".

== Discography ==
=== Albums ===
==== Studio albums ====
List of albums, with selected chart positions
Title	Album details	Peak chart positions		Certifications
Title	Album details	US	US R&B	Certifications
Fever for da Flavor	Released: April 15, 1993; Label: Luke; Format: CD, LP, cassette	16	1	RIAA: Platinum
Beggin' After Dark	Released: November 8, 1994; Label: Luke; Format: CD, LP, cassette	98	21	RIAA: Gold
Ladies Edition, Woman's World	Released: October 28, 1997; Label: Relativity; Format: CD, LP, cassette	53	12	
Imitations of Life	Released: September 27, 2004; Label: BCD Music; Format: CD	—	—	
Child Support	Released: December 9, 2015; Label: H-Town Music; Format: CD, DD	—	—	
Date Night	Released: March 5, 2021; Label: H-Town Music; Format: DD	—	—	

==== Mixtapes ====
List of albums, with selected chart positions
Title	Album details
Call Me Mr. Pac Man	Released: June 2, 2017; Label: H-Town Music; Format: DD

==== Compilation albums ====
List of albums, with selected chart positions
Title	Album details
The Best of H-Town	Released: December 2, 2015; Label: H-Town Music; Format: DD

=== Singles ===
==== As lead artist ====
List of singles, with selected chart positions
Title	Year	Peak chart positions					Certifications	Album
Title	Year	US	US R&B	US Dan	US Rhy	AUS	Certifications	Album
"Knockin' Da Boots"	1993	3	1	14	2	95	RIAA: Platinum	Fever for da Flavor
"Lick U Up"	1993	67	21	—	34	—		Fever for da Flavor
"Keepin' My Composure"	1993	—	46	—	—	—		Fever for da Flavor
"Baby I Wanna"	1994	—	87	—	—	—		Fever for da Flavor
"Part Time Lover" (b/w "I'm Still in Love with You" by Al B. Sure) (Note: In an effort to promote the Above the Rim soundtrack, "Part Time Lover" was released as a double single with Al B. Sure's cover of the hit Al Green song, "I'm Still in Love with You".)	1994	57	9	17	—	—		Above the Rim
"Back Seat (Wit No Sheets)"	1994	—	58	—	—	—		Beggin' After Dark
"Emotions"	1994	51	11	—	—	—		Beggin' After Dark
"A Thin Line Between Love & Hate" (featuring Shirley Murdock)	1996	37	6	—	31	—	RIAA: Gold	A Thin Line Between Love and Hate
"They Like It Slow"	1997	35	12	—	—	—		Ladies Edition, Woman's World
"Nothing In Common"	2004	—	—	—	—	—		Imitations of Life
"Knockin' Your Heels" (featuring Jodeci and Pretty Ricky)	2009	—	—	—	—	—		Child Support
"Lay U Down"	2020	—	—	—	—	—		Date Night
"Lose Control" (featuring Kut Klose)	2021	—	—	—	—	—		Date Night
"Super Love"	2021	—	—	—	—	—		Date Night

==== As featured artist ====
Year	Song	Peak chart positions	Album
Year	Song	US R&B	Album
1992	"You and Me" (Luke featuring Angee Griffin and H-Town)	94	I Got Shit on My Mind (Luke album)
