= Lose Control (album) =

Studio album by Silk
- Released: November 17, 1992
- Recorded: 1991–1992
- Genres: R&B, new jack swing
- Length: 42:18
- Label: Elektra
- Producers: Keith Sweat; Alton "Wokie" Stewart; Roy Murray/TH Production

Silk chronology
Lose Control (1992)	Silk (1995)

Singles from Lose Control
- 1. "Happy Days" Released: October 15, 1992; 2. "Freak Me" Released: February 18, 1993; 3. "Lose Control" Released: June 10, 1993; 4. "Girl U for Me" Released: June 10, 1993; 5. "Baby It's You"; 6. "It Had to Be You"

Professional ratings
Review scores
Source	Rating
AllMusic	4/5 stars
The Philadelphia Inquirer	2.5/4 stars

Lose Control is the debut studio album by American R&B group Silk. The album went to number one on the US Top R&B Albums chart and includes the hit single "Freak Me", which peaked at number one on the Billboard Hot 100 chart. Lose Control was certified double platinum by the RIAA in 1995.

== Track listing ==
1. "Interlude" (Keith Sweat) (T.H Prod)– 1:23
2. "Happy Days" (featuring Keith Sweat and rap by The Riddler) (Keith Sweat, Alton "Wokie" Stewart, Fred Wesley, James Brown, John Starks) – 5:19
3. "Don't Keep Me Waiting" (featuring Gerald Levert and Sean Levert) (Keith Sweat, Alton "Wokie" Stewart) – 4:16
4. "Girl U for Me" (Keith Sweat, Roy Murray, IRocc Williams) – 4:30
5. "Freak Me" (Keith Sweat, Roy Murray, IRocc Williams) featuring rap by Teno West – 4:35
6. "When I Think About You" (Teno West, Gary Jenkins, Gary Glenn, Roy Murray IRocc Williams) featuring rap by Teno West – 3:55
7. "Baby It's You" (Keith Sweat, IRocc Williams) – 4:05
8. "Lose Control" (Keith Sweat, Roy Murray, IRocc Williams Gary Jenkins) – 5:16
9. "It Had to Be You" (Keith Sweat, Roy Murray, IRocc Williams, Gary Jenkins) – 4:10
10. "I Gave to You" (William Hart) – 4:49
- "Happy Days" features a sample of "The Payback" by James Brown.

== Personnel ==
- Alton "Wokie" Stewart – keyboards, drum programming, backing vocals
- Roy Murray, Keni Burke – keyboards, drum programming
- Errol Taylor, Gary Jenkins – keyboards
- iRocc Williams – drum programming

== Charts ==
Chart performance for Lose Control
Chart (1993)	Peak position
Australian Albums (ARIA)	45
US Billboard 200	7
US Top R&B/Hip-Hop Albums (Billboard)	1

== Certifications ==
Certifications for Lose Control
Region	Certification	Certified units/sales
Canada (Music Canada)	Gold	50,000^{^}
United States (RIAA)	2× Platinum	2,000,000^{^}
^{^} Shipments figures based on certification alone.

== See also ==
- List of Billboard number-one R&B albums of 1993
