= Ebony Eyes (Rick James song) =

1983 song by Rick James and Smokey Robinson

Single by Rick James and Smokey Robinson

from the album Cold Blooded
- Released: November 14, 1983
- Recorded: 1983
- Studio: Joint Recording Studio (Buffalo, New York)
- Genre: R&B; soul
- Length: 3:56
- Label: Motown
- Songwriter: Rick James
- Producer: Rick James

Rick James singles chronology
"U Bring the Freak Out" (1983)	"Ebony Eyes" (1983)	"17" (1984)

Smokey Robinson singles chronology
"Touch the Sky" (1983)	"Ebony Eyes" (1983)	"And I Don't Love You" (1984)

Music video
- "Ebony Eyes" on YouTube

"Ebony Eyes" is a song recorded by American singers Rick James and Smokey Robinson for the Gordy (Motown) label. It was released in November 1983 as the third single from Rick James' seventh studio album Cold Blooded. The song was produced and arranged by James. It peaked at number 43 on the Billboard Hot 100 chart.

== Song information ==
"Ebony Eyes" was a collaborative effort between Smokey Robinson and Rick James. First released on the album Cold Blooded, "Ebony Eyes" climbed the R&B chart and peaked at number 22. "Ebony Eyes" is one of the few hits by Rick James to not use the style he labeled "punk-funk" but instead uses a more contemporary tempo and follows a more classic style of R&B. Robinson was credited for singing the introduction, bridge, and other more calm verses while James sang the chorus.

"Ebony Eyes" begins with a simple beat which leads into a more complex rhythm and the vocals of both Robinson and uncredited background vocalist who repeat falsetto vocals twice before Robinson begins the opening verse. The song chronicles the narrator's affection for a certain woman. Lost for words and made weak by the mere presence of this lady, Robinson requires Rick James' vocals to reveal how he really feels about this woman, who Rick James thinks is unaware of his affection and apparent need for her. It is an ode to love for women of color, hence the title "Ebony Eyes".

== Personnel ==
- Vocals and composition by Smokey Robinson and Rick James
- Produced and arranged by Rick James

== Chart performance ==
Chart performance for "Ebony Eyes"
Chart (1983–1984)	Peak position
Brazil (ABPD)	5
UK Singles (OCC)	96
US Billboard Hot 100	43
US Billboard Adult Contemporary	35
US Hot Black Singles (Billboard)	22
