= A Low Down Dirty Shame =

- Theatrical release poster
- Directed by: Keenen Ivory Wayans
- Written by: Keenen Ivory Wayans
- Produced by: Eric L. Gold; Joe Roth; Lee R. Mayes; Michael Waxman; Roger Birnbaum
- Starring: Keenen Ivory Wayans; Charles S. Dutton; Jada Pinkett; Salli Richardson; Andrew Divoff
- Cinematography: Matthew F. Leonetti
- Edited by: John F. Link
- Music by: Marcus Miller
- Production companies: Hollywood Pictures (Note: Credited in the copyright notice; logo is not shown on the film or any promotional material.); Caravan Pictures
- Distributed by: Buena Vista Pictures Distribution
- Release date: November 23, 1994
- Running time: 104 minutes
- Country: United States
- Language: English
- Box office: $29.4 million

A Low Down Dirty Shame is a 1994 American action comedy film written, directed, and starring Keenen Ivory Wayans. The film also stars Charles S. Dutton, Jada Pinkett, Salli Richardson and Corwin Hawkins, who died before the film was released on August 5, 1994. A Low Down Dirty Shame was released by Buena Vista Pictures Distribution on November 23, 1994. The film received negative reviews from critics and grossed $29.4 million.

== Plot ==
Former LAPD detective Andre Shame is a wisecracking, gun-toting private investigator who owns A Low Down Dirty Shame Investigations. He runs it with his energetic and talkative assistant Peaches Jordan, whom he arrested shoplifting six years earlier and to whom he has developed a slight attraction. Despite the high-risk jobs, Shame is unable to keep the firm afloat, and may be forced to close.

Five years ago, Shame and a team of detectives traveled to Mexico to apprehend drug lord, Ernesto Mendoza. Though Shame seemingly shot and killed Mendoza in a shootout, the other detectives were killed, with Shame and colleague Sonny Rothmiller being the only survivors. This caused Shame to leave the force in disgrace.

In the present day, Rothmiller, who is now working for the DEA, tells him that Mendoza is still alive. He hires Shame to find the only witness who would testify against him: his ex-girlfriend Angela, who was involved a love triangle with the two men. Angela escaped from the Witness Protection Program in New York and is in LA. Shame is hesitant at first, but seeing this as a chance to arrest the man who took everything from him, decides to take the case.

Shame gets information on one of Mendoza's lieutenants, Luis, Shame's former childhood acquaintance, then goes to a restaurant and has Luis warn Mendoza that Shame is coming for him. Upon arriving home, Shame is attacked by Mendoza's henchmen and warned by a very much alive Mendoza to back off.

With the help of Peaches and her homosexual roommate Wayman, Shame tracks Angela to a posh hotel, and calls Sonny. Shame explains that he originally went to Mexico for her. She tells Shame that she was going to testify against Mendoza, but Mendoza found her location, forcing her to flee. Shame discovers that Rothmiller is working for Mendoza, and the two barely escape Mendoza's thugs. Shame drops Angela at Peaches'.

Shame cleans himself up, then abducts Luis and takes him to an abandoned building. When Luis refuses to give Shame Mendoza's whereabouts, Shame has him stumble into a meeting of white supremacists. With the supremacists chasing him, he gives Shame his boss's location in exchange for a ride. But Shame leaves him at their mercy.

At the club, Shame and Mendoza exchange words, then get into a Mexican standoff with Mendoza using his date as a hostage. When Wayman attempts to get Shame's attention, Mendoza uses the distraction to escape. Shame goes to Peaches to find Angela gone (she and Peaches had gotten into an argument earlier), and Captain Nunez waiting for him. He has Nunez place Peaches in protective custody and heads off to find Angela.

Shame meets Angela at a motel and discovers the real reason Mendoza wants her dead: she stole $20 million of his money. At the motel, Shame receives a call from Mendoza informing him he has kidnapped Peaches and will exchange her for Angela and his money. The two agree to meet at a Mendoza-owned shopping mall. Angela tries to convince Shame to leave with her, however, admitting that he cares for Peaches, Shame refuses and the two of them head to the mall.

Before the exchange, Sonny admits he was the one who killed the other detectives because they wouldn't take Mendoza's bribe without Shame. He left Shame alive to take the blame. Peaches and Angela are placed on the escalator, and Mendoza discovers that "Angela" is actually a mannequin. With a gun hidden on the escalator, Peaches begins shooting. Shame kills the mercenaries hired by Sonny, Luis is attacked by the dogs that were supposed to kill Shame, and Angela kills Sonny.

Mendoza captures Peaches, only to be confronted by Shame. After winning a fistfight, Shame arrests Mendoza, who is then killed by Angela. She attempts to kill Shame, telling him she knows he won't allow her to keep the money she stole. Peaches comes and fights off Angela. Nunez threatens to arrest Shame, but Shame reminds Nunez that he helped take down a drug lord, identified Sonny as the DEA mole, found a federal witness on the run (Angela, who is lead away in handcuffs for her crimes), and recovered $15 million in stolen drug money. Nunez reluctantly lets Shame go. Shame keeps $5 million for expenses, with Peaches getting perks of a romantic relationship with Shame.

== Cast ==
- Keenen Ivory Wayans as Andre Shame
- Charles S. Dutton as Sonny Rothmiller
- Jada Pinkett as Peaches Jordan
- Salli Richardson as Angela Flowers
- Andrew Divoff as Ernesto Mendoza
- Corwin Hawkins as Wayman Harrington
- Gary Cervantes as Luis
- Gregory Sierra as Captain Nunez
- Chris Spencer as Benny
- Don Diamont as Chad
- John Capodice as Mob Boss
- Andrew Shaifer as Bernard
- Kim Wayans as Diane
- René Hicks as Hooker

== Soundtrack ==
A soundtrack containing hip hop and R&B music was released on November 8, 1994, by Jive Records and Hollywood Records. It peaked at #70 on the Billboard 200 and #14 on the Top R&B/Hip-Hop Albums.

== Reception ==
On the review aggregator website Rotten Tomatoes, 4% of 24 critics' reviews are positive, with an average rating of 4.1/10. The website's consensus reads: "A trifecta of failure for writer-director-star Keenen Ivory Wayans, A Low Down Dirty Shame lives repeatedly and resolutely down to its title."

== Year-end lists ==
- Top 10 worst (not ranked) – Dan Webster, The Spokesman-Review
- Top 18 worst (alphabetically listed, not ranked) – Michael Mills, The Palm Beach Post
