= Silk (group) =

Atlanta-founded R&B group

- Origin: Atlanta, Georgia, U.S.
- Genres: R&B, new jack swing
- Years active: 1989–present
- Labels: Elektra; Liquid 8 Shanachie; Silk Music Group
- Members: Tim "Timzo" Cameron; Jimmy Gates; Gary "Big G" Glenn; Johnathen "John-John" Rasboro; Gary "Lil G" Jenkins

Silk is an American R&B group, formed in 1989 in Atlanta, Georgia. They are best known for their 1993 hit single, "Freak Me", which reached number-one on the US Billboard Hot 100.

== Career ==
Silk was discovered by the musician Keith Sweat. The group was originally a quintet made up of Timothy "Timzo" Cameron, James "Jimmy" Gates, Jr., Johnathen "John John" Rasboro, Tyga Graham and Albert "Nella" Allen. Gary "Big G" Glenn and Gary "Lil G" Jenkins joined shortly after the departures of Graham and Allen.

Silk is best known for their hit singles "Freak Me" and "Happy Days" from their debut album, Lose Control. Another hit from Lose Control, "Girl U for Me", helped the album reach double platinum status. They later had success with singles such as "I Can Go Deep", "Hooked on You", "Don't Rush", "If You", "Meeting in My Bedroom", and "We're Calling You". In 1994, Silk won Album of the Year for Lose Control at the Soul Train Music Awards.

In 2002, Silk left Elektra and took a hiatus. That same year, Jenkins went on to pursue other interests and made his stage debut as 'AJ' in the Tyler Perry play Madea's Family Reunion. He resurfaced musically in 2007 with his solo debut, The Other Side. Silk and Sweat both appeared in the group Black Men United on the song "U Will Know" which is featured on soundtrack for the film Jason's Lyric. Silk has also appeared on the soundtracks for Booty Call ("Feel Good"), Made in America ("Does He Do It Good" with Keith Sweat), A Low Down Dirty Shame ("I Can Go Deep"), and Blankman ("Cry On").

In 2003, the group, now a quartet, released their fifth studio album Silktime on their own label Silk Music Group. The album featured the songs "Silktime", "My Girl", "Alibi", "More", "You (The Baby Song)", "Check My Story" and a cover version of Blue Magic's "Sideshow". That song reunited them with their mentor Keith Sweat. The album appeared on the Billboard 200.

In 2006, the group returned with their sixth release, a covers album entitled Always and Forever on Shanachie Records. The album features covers of R&B songs including "Adore" by Prince, "Always and Forever" by Heatwave, and "Secret Garden" by Quincy Jones. "Secret Garden" was the only single from the album.

Jenkins has since rejoined Silk; their seventh album, Quiet Storm, was released on March 18, 2016 on Shanachie Records.

In 2018, Silk celebrated 25 years in the music business with two star studded concerts - one at B.B. King's in New York in February and the other in Atlanta in March. They were also honored with an episode on the popular series Unsung that same year.

== Members ==
- Gary Glenn - second tenor
- Johnathen Rasboro - countertenor
- Timothy Cameron - bass
- James "Jimmy" Gates, Jr. - baritone
- Gary "Lil G" Jenkins - tenor

== Former members ==
- Tyga Graham
- Albert Allen

== Discography ==
=== Albums ===
==== Studio albums ====
| Year | Album details | Peak chart positions | | | | | Certifications |
| Year | Album details | US | US R&B | AUS | CAN | UK | Certifications |
|---|---|---|---|---|---|---|---|
| 1992 | Lose Control: Release date: November 17, 1992; Label: Elektra | 7 | 1 | 45 | 8 | — | RIAA: 2× Platinum; MC: Gold |
| 1995 | Silk: Release date: November 28, 1995; Label: Elektra | 46 | 10 | 199 | — | 130 | RIAA: Gold |
| 1999 | Tonight: Release date: March 23, 1999; Label: Elektra | 21 | 8 | — | — | — | RIAA: Platinum |
| 2001 | Love Session: Release date: June 12, 2001; Label: Elektra | 20 | 2 | — | — | — | |
| 2003 | Silktime: Release date: September 23, 2003; Label: Silk, Liquid 8 | 178 | 30 | — | — | — | |
| 2006 | Always and Forever: Release date: October 17, 2006; Label: Shanachie | — | 23 | — | — | — | |
| 2016 | Quiet Storm: Release date: March 18, 2016; Label: Shanachie | — | 26 | — | — | — | |
"—" denotes a recording that did not chart or was not released in that territory.

==== Compilation albums ====
| Year | Album details | Peak position |
| Year | Album details | US R&B |
|---|---|---|
| 2004 | The Best of Silk: Released: May 25, 2004; Label: Elektra | 54 |

=== Singles ===
| Year | Single | Peak chart positions | | | | | | | Certifications | Album |
| Year | Single | US | US R&B | AUS | CAN | NLD | NZ | UK | Certifications | Album |
|---|---|---|---|---|---|---|---|---|---|---|
| 1992 | "Happy Days" | 86 | 13 | — | — | — | — | — | | Lose Control |
| 1993 | "Freak Me" | 1 | 1 | 3 | 43 | 42 | 9 | 46 | RIAA: Platinum; ARIA: 2× Platinum; RMNZ: Gold | Lose Control |
| 1993 | "Girl U for Me" | 26 | 4 | 57 | — | — | 30 | 67 | | Lose Control |
| 1993 | "Lose Control" | 26 | 4 | — | — | — | — | — | | Lose Control |
| 1993 | "It Had to Be You" | 109 | 45 | 114 | — | — | — | — | | Lose Control |
| 1993 | "Baby It's You" | — | — | — | — | — | — | 44 | | Lose Control |
| 1994 | "I Can Go Deep" | 71 | 22 | — | — | — | — | — | | A Low Down Dirty Shame / Silk |
| 1995 | "Hooked on You" | 54 | 12 | 110 | — | — | 11 | 77 | | Silk |
| 1996 | "Don't Rush" | 91 | 39 | — | — | — | — | — | | Silk |
| 1999 | "If You (Lovin' Me)" | 13 | 4 | — | — | — | 28 | — | RIAA: Gold | Tonight |
| 1999 | "Meeting in My Bedroom" | 62 | 15 | — | — | — | — | — | | Tonight |
| 1999 | "Let's Make Love" | — | 58 | — | — | — | — | — | | Tonight |
| 2001 | "We're Callin U" | — | 56 | — | — | — | — | — | | Love Session |
| 2001 | "Ebony Eyes" | — | — | — | — | — | — | — | | Love Session |
| 2003 | "Silktime" | — | — | — | — | — | — | — | | Silktime |
| 2004 | "Side Show" | — | 66 | — | — | — | — | — | | Silktime |
| 2006 | "The Secret Garden (Sweet Seduction Suite)" | — | — | — | — | — | — | — | | Always and Forever |
| 2016 | "Love 4 U 2 Like Me" | — | — | — | — | — | — | — | | Quiet Storm |
"—" denotes a recording that did not chart or was not released in that territory.
