= Gary Jenkins =

American musician

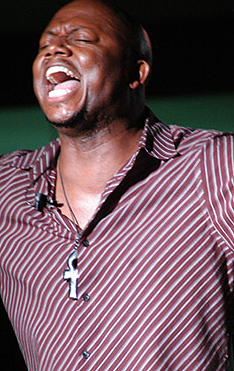
- Gary Jenkins in live stage performance 2005

Background information
- Born: Gary Jenkins
- Origin: Nashville, Tennessee, U.S.
- Genres: R&B
- Instruments: Vocals, bass guitar, acoustic guitar, piano, keyboards
- Years active: 1991–present
- Label: Anaphora
- Website: http://www.garygjenkins.com

Gary "Lil G" Jenkins is an American musician. He is the lead singer of the R&B group Silk. Born and raised in Nashville, he is the youngest of seven children.

== Musical career ==
Gary began singing in church at the age of seven, which earned him a role as a featured soloist on BET's The Bobby Jones Gospel Show for many years. By the age of nine, Gary had mastered the guitar after only a few lessons and had self-taught an assortment of keyboards, drums and guitars.

While attending Tennessee State University (TSU) in Nashville, Gary majored in music, with an emphasis in piano and voice. As a member of the prestigious TSU Jazz Collegians, he was selected to accompany Dizzy Gillespie on piano during Gillespie's visit to the school. He also appeared in several opera productions and performed with the Aristocrat of Bands, TSU's marching band program.

In 1992, Gary answered an audition call and earned the role as lead singer for Keith Sweat's newly formed R&B group Silk. Their career began with the success of "Freak Me" and "Lose Control" from Silk's 1992 debut album Lose Control. Their career spanned the globe for nearly ten years, with more than five million records sold. In September 1994, Jenkins appeared in the R&B group, Black Men United and with his group Silk and mentor Keith Sweat on the single, "U Will Know" from the soundtrack to the movie, Jason's Lyric. The success of their second album, Silk, led to the follow-up, Tonight. Remaining consistent, they released their fourth album, Love Session in 2001. The group gained national recognition with his appearances on The Tonight Show with Jay Leno, Live with Regis and Kathi Lee, MTV, BET, Soul Train, Jenny Jones, Ricki Lake, Moesha, Showtime at the Apollo and Motown Live among others. Achieving international acclaim, Gary has toured throughout the world in such countries as Japan, Korea, the United Kingdom, Canada, Mexico, France, the Netherlands and Germany.

With unresolved dissension among the group members mounting after the folding of their record label, Elektra, Gary resigned from the group in 2002. Over the following 18 months, Gary wrote, recorded and produced (with live instruments) his first independent solo project, The Other Side.

Gary also studied theater in school, co-starring in Hello, Dolly! and Harvey. He made his professional debut in 1997 in the production of Sneaky. He has since appeared in numerous nationally touring stage plays including Fake Friends, Perilous Times, Secret Lovers, Tyler Perry's Madea's Family Reunion, What Men Don't Tell, Whatever She Wants and Love Unbreakable by Lavarious A. Slaughter.

Gary is a member of the R&B supergroup, Blayse, along with Marc Nelson and Tony Grant formerly of Az Yet and Terrell Phillips formerly of Blackstreet. The group has yet to release a single.

After appearing with Silk during Keith Sweat's "Sweat Hotel" tour in 2006 and subsequent release of the concert footage on the DVD "Sweat Hotel", Jenkins reunited with Silk and began touring and recording in late 2007.

In June 2017, he appeared as the featured guest vocal artist of urban adult instrumentalist, Journell Henry (p/k/a. J. Henry), soon to be released single, "Cupid's Arrow".

== Solo discography ==
=== Albums ===
- The Other Side (Anaphora Records, 2007)
