= BeforeAfter (Daryl Hall album) =

Compilation album by Daryl Hall
- Released: April 1, 2022
- Recorded: August 1977 – March 2022
- Genres: Pop rock; rock; R&B; soul
- Length: 144:57
- Label: Legacy Recordings

Daryl Hall chronology
Laughing Down Crying (2011)	BeforeAfter (2022)	D (2024)

BeforeAfter is a compilation album by Daryl Hall, released in 2022. It features his solo work outside from Hall & Oates, composed of 30 songs draw from Hall's five studio albums—Sacred Songs (1980), Three Hearts in the Happy Ending Machine (1986), Soul Alone (1993), Can't Stop Dreaming (1996) and Laughing Down Crying (2011)—as well as from his long-running concert broadcast series, Live from Daryl's House. It was released on April 1, 2022, on Sony's Legacy Recordings imprint.

Hall released the solo retrospective because his Hall & Oates audience hadn't been exposed to much of it. "I obviously had this whole body of work that I haven't really performed other than at Live from Daryl's House. I do a lot of these songs on the Live from Daryl's House show, which is one of the reasons I started Live from Daryl’s House, so there would be an outlet for me to have to play all my music, not just the music I write for Hall & Oates. I consider what I do outside of that as just as important to me. I have a long history of working with various people and I want to bring it out there, you know? Have the world hear it and all those things."

Eight of the album's 30 tracks are from Live from Daryl's House. Guests include David A. Stewart, with whom Hall covers Stewart's band Eurythmics' hit "Here Comes the Rain Again", Monte Montgomery on a live version of Hall's "North Star", and Todd Rundgren, who joins Hall on Rundgren's hit "Can We Still Be Friends". Rundgren joined Hall on a 2022 U.S. tour in support of BeforeAfter.

== Track listing ==
All tracks are written by Daryl Hall, except where noted.

Disc 1
No.	Title	Writer(s)	Original release	Length
1.	"Dreamtime"	Hall; John Beeby	Three Hearts in the Happy Ending Machine, 1986	4:45
2.	"Babs and Babs"		Sacred Songs, 1980	7:44
3.	"Foolish Pride"		Three Hearts in the Happy Ending Machine	3:57
4.	"Can't Stop Dreaming"	Hall; Walter Afanasieff; Alan Gorrie; Dan Shea	Can't Stop Dreaming, 1996	4:13
5.	"Here Comes the Rain Again" (with David A. Stewart)	Annie Lennox; Stewart	Live from Daryl's House episode 41, April 15, 2011	4:45
6.	"Someone Like You"		Three Hearts in the Happy Ending Machine	5:32
7.	"Talking to You (Is Like Talking to Myself)"		Laughing Down Crying, 2011	4:27
8.	"Sacred Songs"		Sacred Songs	3:15
9.	"Right as Rain"		Three Hearts in the Happy Ending Machine	4:24
10.	"Survive"		Sacred Songs	6:39
11.	"North Star" (with Monte Montgomery)		Live from Daryl's House episode 9, July 15, 2008	4:01
12.	"In My Own Dream"	Paul Butterfield	Live from Daryl's House	5:51
13.	"NYCNY"	Hall; Robert Fripp	Sacred Songs	4:28
14.	"What's Gonna Happen to Us"		Three Hearts in the Happy Ending Machine	5:39

Disc 2
No.	Title	Writer(s)	Original release	Length
15.	"Love Revelation"	Hall; Peter Lord Moreland; V. Jeffrey Smith; Gorrie	Soul Alone, 1993	4:35
16.	"Fools Rush In"	Hall; Gorrie; David Bellochio	Can't Stop Dreaming	4:23
17.	"I'm in a Philly Mood"	Hall; Moreland; Smith; Gorrie	Soul Alone	5:14
18.	"Send Me"	Hall; Moreland; Smith; Gorrie	Soul Alone	4:56
19.	"Justify"	Hall; Louis Brown	Can't Stop Dreaming	3:57
20.	"Borderline"	Hall; Lena Fiagbe; Michael Peden	Soul Alone	6:16
21.	"Stop Loving Me, Stop Loving You"	Hall; Sara Allen; Marvin Gaye	Soul Alone	4:42
22.	"Eyes for You (Ain't No Doubt About It)"		Laughing Down Crying	5:35
23.	"The Farther Away I Am"		Sacred Songs	2:52
24.	"Why Was It So Easy"		Sacred Songs	5:28
25.	"Can We Still Be Friends" (with Todd Rundgren)	Rundgren	Live from Daryl's House episode 23, September 15, 2009	4:13
26.	"Cab Driver"	Hall; Gorrie; Brown	Can't Stop Dreaming	5:22
27.	"Our Day Will Come"	Bob Hilliard; Mort Garson	Live from Daryl's House	4:11
28.	"Laughing Down Crying" (Live from Daryl's House)		Laughing Down Crying	4:20
29.	"Problem with You" (Live from Daryl's House)		Laughing Down Crying	4:40
30.	"Neither One of Us (Wants to Be the First to Say Goodbye)"	Jim Weatherly	Live from Daryl's House	4:33
