= VH1 Behind the Music: The Daryl Hall and John Oates Collection =

2002 greatest hits album by Hall & Oates

Greatest hits album by Hall & Oates
- Released: March 19, 2002
- Recorded: 1975–2001
- Genre: Pop rock
- Length: 79:27
- Labels: RCA; Arista; BMG Heritage

Hall & Oates chronology
Greatest Hits Live (2001)	VH1 Behind the Music: The Daryl Hall and John Oates Collection (2002)	Do It for Love (2003)

Professional ratings
Review scores
Source	Rating
AllMusic	2.5/5 stars

VH1 Behind the Music: The Daryl Hall and John Oates Collection is a compilation album by Hall & Oates, released by RCA Records/Arista Records/BMG Heritage Records on March 19, 2002. Behind the Music is a TV series that aired on VH1 and this compilation was released in connection with the episode featuring the duo. It features three new studio tracks and a few new live recordings. Two of the three new songs ("Heartbreak Time," and "Do It for Love") were recorded for the duo's next album, Do It For Love. It also features an acoustic re-recording of "Someone Like You" (retitled "Somebody Like You" for this release) from Hall's 1986 solo album Three Hearts in the Happy Ending Machine.

== Track listing ==
No.	Title	Writer(s)	Original release	Length
1.	"Sara Smile"	Daryl Hall; John Oates	Daryl Hall & John Oates, 1975	3:09
2.	"Rich Girl"	Hall	Bigger Than Both of Us, 1976	2:26
3.	"Do What You Want, Be What You Are"	Hall; Oates	Bigger Than Both of Us	4:36
4.	"You Make My Dreams"	Hall; Oates; Sara Allen	Voices, 1980	3:07
5.	"I Can't Go for That (No Can Do)"	Hall; Oates; S. Allen	Private Eyes, 1981	5:09
6.	"One on One"	Hall	H_{2}O, 1982	4:19
7.	"Maneater"	Hall; Oates; S. Allen	H_{2}O	4:32
8.	"Say It Isn't So"	Hall	Rock 'n Soul Part 1, 1983	4:18
9.	"Out of Touch"	Hall; Oates	Big Bam Boom, 1984	4:26
10.	"Everything Your Heart Desires"	Hall	Ooh Yeah!, 1988	5:19
11.	"Kiss on My List" (live)	Hall; Janna Allen	Voices	4:37
12.	"She's Gone" (live)	Hall; Oates	Abandoned Luncheonette, 1973	5:23
13.	"So Close" (Unplugged version)	Hall; George Green; Jon Bon Jovi; Danny Kortchmar	Change of Season, 1990	4:52
14.	"Everytime You Go Away" (live)	Hall; Oates	Voices	9:14
15.	"Somebody Like You"	Hall	New recording; originally from Hall's Three Hearts in the Happy Ending Machine, 1986	5:53
16.	"Heartbreak Time"	Hall; Paul Barry; Billy Mann; Mark Taylor	New recording	4:09
17.	"Do It for Love"	Hall; Oates; Mann; Paul Pesco	New recording; later released on Do It for Love, 2003	3:58
Total length:				79:27
