= Do It for Love =

Do It for Love may refer to:

- Do It for Love (Hall & Oates album), 2003
  - "Do It for Love" (Hall & Oates song)
- "Do It for Love" (Marty Balin song), 1983
- Do It for Love (Alesha Dixon album), 2015
- "Do It for Love", a song by Sheena Easton from the 1985 album Do You
