= Inner Vision =

Inner Vision may refer to:

- "Inner Vision", Multiplicity (album) by Dave Weckl
- Inner Vision EP by Jun Toba
- "Innervision", song by System of a Down

== See also ==
- Innervisions, Stevie Wonder album
