= Foolish Pride =

Foolish Pride may refer to:

- Foolish Pride (Travis Tritt song), 1994
- Foolish Pride (Daryl Hall song), 1986
