= Jerry Ricks =

American blues musician (1940–2007)

- Also known as: "Philadelphia" Jerry Ricks
- Born: Gerald Lawrence Ricks; May 22, 1940; Philadelphia, Pennsylvania, U.S.
- Died: December 10, 2007 (aged 67) Rijeka, Croatia
- Genres: Country blues
- Occupation(s): Guitarist, singer

Gerald Lawrence "Jerry" Ricks (May 22, 1940 – December 10, 2007), often billed as "Philadelphia" Jerry Ricks, was an American country blues guitarist and singer.

== Life and career ==
Ricks was born and grew up in Philadelphia, Pennsylvania, playing trumpet as a child. He started playing guitar in local coffee shops in the late 1950s. He worked as a booking manager for the Second Fret Coffee House in Philadelphia from 1960-1966, coming into contact with many key figures in the blues revival, including Son House, Lightnin' Hopkins, Libba Cotten, Jesse Fuller, Mance Lipscomb, and Lonnie Johnson. He recorded with Mississippi John Hurt in 1964.

In 1969, Ricks toured with Buddy Guy on a State Department-sponsored East African tour. After returning to the U.S. briefly to do field work in Arkansas for the Smithsonian Institution, he moved to Europe in 1971. He lived in Europe for most of the 1970s and 1980s, only returning to the US in 1972 and 1973, when he recorded with Hall & Oates on Whole Oats and Abandoned Luncheonette. In Germany, he recorded several albums with Oscar Klein, and in Italy recorded with Giulio Camarca.

His first solo album, in 1984, was recorded in Zagreb, at that time in Yugoslavia, and he also recorded albums in Hungary, Austria and Switzerland. He returned to live in the United States in the early 1990s. On February 17, 1991, he and John Oates performed "Come Back Baby" at Hall & Oates' concert at the Tower Theater in Upper Darby. His first American releases did not arrive until 1998, when Rooster Blues released his Deep in the Well. The album was nominated for three W.C. Handy Awards. Many Miles of Blues followed on the same label in 2000.

In 2007, Ricks and his wife moved to Kastav, Croatia. He suffered a stroke that year, and a benefit concert featuring Shemekia Copeland and David Bromberg was held in the US to help pay his medical bills. He died on December 10, 2007, aged 67, in a hospital in Rijeka, Croatia.

The biggest blues festival in Croatia, Kastav Blues Festival, was established in honour of Ricks. It has been held since 2008 and is still ongoing. Every year in the first week of August, eminent names of national, European and global blues musicians assemble in Kastav, Croatia, to honour Ricks' influence.

Ricks fathered two children: Jamie R. Ricks (June 11, 1963 – September 1, 2017) and visual artist Kellie L. Ricks (May 1964 – September 2020).
