= Getaway Car =

Getaway Car may refer to:

- A car used in a crime scene getaway
- "Getaway Car" (Susan Ashton song), 1999, also recorded by 4 Runner, Hall & Oates, and The Jenkins
- "Getaway Car" (Taylor Swift song), 2018
- "Getaway Car", a song by Audioslave from the album Audioslave, 2002
- "Getaway Car", a song by Smash Mouth from the album Summer Girl, 2006
- "Getaway Car", a song by Carly Rose, 2019
- The Getaway Car, a 2016 BBC television series
