= Wherever Would I Be =

1990 single by Cheap Trick

Single by Cheap Trick

from the album Busted
- B-side: "Busted"
- Released: October 1990
- Genre: Rock
- Length: 4:06
- Label: Epic
- Songwriter: Diane Warren
- Producer: Richie Zito

Cheap Trick singles chronology
"Can't Stop Fallin' into Love" (1990)	"Wherever Would I Be" (1990)	"If You Need Me" (1990)

"Wherever Would I Be" is a song by American rock band Cheap Trick, released in 1990 as the second single from their eleventh studio album, Busted. It was written by American songwriter Diane Warren and produced by Richie Zito. "Wherever Would I Be" peaked at number 50 in December 1990 on the US Billboard Hot 100.

== Critical reception ==
In a review of Busted, Cash Box described the song as a "strong power ballad". Reviewing the song for AllMusic, Doug Stone commented: "Cheap Trick sleepwalks through the motions on this Diane Warren treacle. Loopy axe murderer Rick Nielsen steps up for a decent guitar solo, but no rock band should put fans through something like this. On the back is "Busted," the title track to Trick's nadir. Cheap Trick is so much above the material on both sides here."

== Music video ==
A music video was filmed to promote the single. It achieved medium rotation on MTV and play on The Jukebox Network and Hit Video USA.

== Track listing ==
- 7" single
1. "Wherever Would I Be" - 4:06
2. "Busted" - 4:04
- 7" single (Spanish promo)
1. "Wherever Would I Be" - 4:06
2. "Wherever Would I Be" - 4:06
- CD single (US promo)
1. "Wherever Would I Be" - 3:55
- CD single (Japanese promo)
1. "Wherever Would I Be" - 4:06
2. "Busted" - 4:04

== Charts ==
Chart (1990)	Peak position
Australia (ARIA)	153
Canada Top Singles (RPM)	59
US Billboard Hot 100	50
US Billboard Hot 100 Airplay	69
US Cash Box Top 100	44

== Personnel ==
Cheap Trick

- Robin Zander - lead vocals, rhythm guitar
- Rick Nielsen - lead guitar, backing vocals
- Tom Petersson - bass, backing vocals
- Bun E. Carlos - drums, percussion

Additional personnel

- Richie Zito - producer
- Mike Shipley - mixing
- George Marino - mastering

== Dusty Springfield and Daryl Hall version ==
"Wherever Would I Be"

Single by Dusty Springfield & Daryl Hall

from the album A Very Fine Love
- B-side: "All I Have to Offer You is Love"; "Reputation"
- Released: 1995
- Genre: Pop
- Length: 3:52
- Label: Columbia
- Songwriter: Diane Warren
- Producer: Tom Shapiro

Dusty Springfield & Daryl Hall singles chronology
"Goin Back"/"Son of a Preacher Man" (1994)	"Wherever Would I Be" (1995)	"Roll Away" (1995)

Alternative Cover
- UK Maxi CD Single #2 cover of "Wherever Would I Be"

Music video
- "Wherever Would I Be" on YouTube

In 1995, British pop singer Dusty Springfield and American rock/soul singer Daryl Hall recorded a duet version of the track. Added to Springfield's fifteenth studio album, A Very Fine Love (1995), the song was the second-to-last single from Springfield. Due to modest sales of the album, Springfield and Columbia Records decided not to renew her contract. Springfield's breast cancer recurred in late 1996, and Springfield died in 1999, making A Very Fine Love her final album.

The version was used in the 1995 movie While You Were Sleeping, starring Sandra Bullock and Bill Pullman. The song was also released as a single in mid-1995, peaking at #44 in the UK for a total of three weeks.

The main European version of the CD single featured two tracks, the A-side duet and the 1990 Springfield hit "Reputation". The European Maxi CD single featured four tracks; the A-side, a remix of the A-side titled "Wherever Would I Be (Walter A. Mix)", a solo version of "Wherever Would I Be" with the vocal handled by Springfield alone and the 1990 hit "Reputation".

The UK Maxi CD single featured four tracks; the a-side, a track from her "A Very Fine Love" album titled "All I Have To Offer You Is Love", the 1990 hit "Reputation" and the solo version of "Wherever Would I Be". Another UK Maxi CD single featured another four tracks; the A-side, a remix of the 1990 album track "Daydreaming", titled "Daydreaming (Edited 12" Master)", the edited single mix of "Arrested by You" and the remix of the A-side titled "Wherever Would I Be (Walter A. Mix)". The single artwork consisted of two zoomed-in shots of Springfield, taken from the artwork for the album A Very Fine Love.

A music video was created for the duet.

=== Critical reception ===
In a review of the A Very Fine Love album, Bruce Eder of AllMusic commented, "Indeed, the performances and the songs here stack up favorably next to, say, "Brand New Me", her early-'70s intersection with Philly soul. One song here, "Where Would I Be?", which features a duet with Daryl Hall, got a little play for being in the movie While You Were Sleeping, but otherwise, sad to say, this album passed relatively unnoticed for most of the public." Sarra Manning from Melody Maker viewed it as "a faux sincere duet". Amy Raphael from NME wrote, "If this is not the theme to Forrest Gump II, it should be."

=== Track listing ===
- CD single (European release)
1. "Wherever Would I Be" - 3:52
2. "Reputation" - 4:10
- CD maxi-single (European release)
1. "Wherever Would I Be" - 3:53
2. "Wherever Would I Be (Walter A. Mix)" - 4:00
3. "Wherever Would I Be (Dusty Solo)" - 3:53
4. "Reputation" - 4:10
- CD maxi-single (UK release #1)
1. "Wherever Would I Be" - 3:52
2. "All I Have to Offer You is Love" - 3:47
3. "Reputation" - 4:10
4. "Wherever Would I Be (Dusty Solo)" - 3:51
- CD maxi-single (UK release #2)
1. "Wherever Would I Be" - 3:56
2. "Daydreaming (Edited 12" Master)" - 8:18
3. "Arrested by You (Single Version)" - 3:50
4. "Wherever Would I Be (Walter A. Mix)" - 4:00
- CD single (UK promo release)
1. "Wherever Would I Be" - 3:53

=== Charts ===
Chart (1995)	Peak position
Germany (Media Control)	73
Iceland (Íslenski Listinn Topp 40)	11
UK Singles (OCC)	44

=== Personnel ===
- Dusty Springfield - lead vocal
- Daryl Hall - lead vocal

Production

- Tom Shapiro - producer of "Wherever Would I Be" and "All I Have To Offer You Is Love", arranger on "Wherever Would I Be (Walter A. Mix)"
- Brian Tankersley - recording and mixing on "Wherever Would I Be" and "Wherever Would I Be (Walter A. Mix)"
- Walter Afanasieff - additional production and arrangement on "Wherever Would I Be (Walter A. Mix)"
- Jay Healy - recording on "Wherever Would I Be (Walter A. Mix)"
- Dana Jon Chappelle - recording and mixing on "Wherever Would I Be (Walter A. Mix)"
- Mick Guzauski - mixing on "Wherever Would I Be (Walter A. Mix)"
- Andy Richards - producer of "Reputation"
- Julian Mendelsohn, Pet Shop Boys - producers of "Daydreaming (Edited 12" Master)"
- Paul Staveley O'Duffy - producer of "Arrested by You"

Other

- John Geary - illustration
- Stylorouge - design

== Other cover versions ==
- In 1997, a Diane Warren promotional six-disc set titled A Passion for Music featured four discs of the hits of Diane Warren from 1983 to 1997, and two discs of demos. Amongst the demo versions is the original demo of "Wherever Would I Be", performed by Warren herself.
