= Laughing Down Crying =

Studio album by Daryl Hall
- Released: September 27, 2011
- Recorded: 2010–2011
- Genres: Pop rock, rock, R&B, soul
- Length: 44:48
- Labels: Verve, Verve Forecast
- Producers: Greg Bieck; John Fields; Daryl Hall; Paul Pesco; T-Bone Wolk

Daryl Hall chronology
Can't Stop Dreaming (1996)	Laughing Down Crying (2011)	BeforeAfter (2022)

Laughing Down Crying is the fifth solo album by American recording artist Daryl Hall. It was released on September 27, 2011, on Verve Records. Co-producer and bandmate T-Bone Wolk died during early recording sessions for the disc; Hall dedicated the record to him. Hall debuted the album on a two-part episode of his series Live from Daryl's House.

== Track listing ==
All tracks are written by Daryl Hall, except where noted.

No.	Title	Writer(s)	Length
1.	"Laughing Down Crying"		4:11
2.	"Talking to You (Is Like Talking to Myself)"		4:26
3.	"Lifetime of Love"	Hall; Billy Mann	3:48
4.	"Eyes for You (Ain't No Doubt About It)"		5:34
5.	"Save Me"		4:17
6.	"Message to Ya"	Hall; Paul Pesco	4:15
7.	"Wrong Side of History"		3:45
8.	"Get Out of the Way"		4:59
9.	"Crash & Burn"		4:44
10.	"Problem with You"		4:38
Total length:			44:56

Japanese release bonus track
No.	Title	Length
11.	"Don't Wait Too Long"	4:09
Total length:		48:57

== Singles ==
The lead single, "Talking to You (Is like Talking to Myself)", reached number 16 on the Adult Contemporary chart on the November 12, 2011 issue, it stayed there for two weeks for a total of twenty weeks on the chart.

"Eyes for You" went to number 23 on the Adult Contemporary chart on July 14, 2012, staying at its peak for a week, for a total of 14 weeks on that chart.

Also, "Eyes for You" peaked at number five on Billboard's Smooth Jazz Airplay chart on November 26, 2011, staying there for a week, accumulating a run of 20 weeks total on the chart. This was Hall's only song on that chart.

== Charts ==
Chart (2011)	Peak position
US Billboard 200	142

== Personnel ==
- Daryl Hall – lead and backing vocals, keyboards, acoustic guitars, electric guitars, synth bass, percussion
- Greg Bieck – keyboards, drum programming
- John Fields – keyboards (3), synth bass (10), drum programming (10)
- Paul Pesco – acoustic guitars, electric guitars, bass (1, 6)
- T-Bone Wolk – acoustic guitar (3, 7, 10), bass (3, 7, 10)
- Zev Katz – bass (1, 2, 9)
- Jerry Duplessis – bass (9)
- Shawn Pelton – drums (1, 3, 6, 7, 9)
- Mickey Curry – drums (2, 8, 10)
- John Scarpulla – baritone saxophone (3, 5, 6), tenor saxophones (3, 5, 6)
- Charles DeChant – tenor saxophone (3, 5, 6)
- David Mann – tenor saxophone (3, 5, 6)
- Barry Danielian – trumpet (3, 5, 6)
- Larry Gold – horn arrangements (3, 5, 6), string arrangements (9)
- March Fry – backing vocals (3–5)
- Klyde Jones – backing vocals (3), bass (5, 6)
- Everett Bradley – backing vocals (6)

== Production ==
- Producers – Daryl Hall, Greg Bieck and Paul Pesco.
- Additional Producers – John Fields and T-Bone Wolk
- Engineers – Greg Bieck and Peter Moshay
- Recorded at A-Pawling Studios (Pawling, NY); Red House Studios (Bedfordshire, England); Studio 44 (Monster, Holland); Afro Head Studios.
- Mixed by Michael H. Brauer at Electric Lady Studios (New York, NY).
- Package Design – Kathy Phillips at Phillips Design.
- Photography – Mark Maglio (cover and interior shots); Elliot Lewis (back cover interior shots); Paul Pesco and Peter Moshay.
- Management – Jonathan Wolfson at Wolfson Entertainment, Inc.
