= Can't Stop Dreaming =

- 2003 North American edition

Studio album by Daryl Hall
- Released: (Japan) November 21, 1996 (United States) June 10, 2003
- Recorded: June 1995
- Studios: A-Pawling Studios (Pawling); Marion Recording (Fairview); The Plant Recording Studios (Los Angeles)
- Genres: Rock; pop; jazz
- Length: 56:03
- Labels: RCA; BMG; Liquid 8
- Producers: Daryl Hall; David Bellochio; Walter Afanasieff; Buster & Shovani; Michael Peden

Daryl Hall chronology
Soul Alone (1993)	Can't Stop Dreaming (1996)	Laughing Down Crying (2011)

Professional ratings
Review scores
Source	Rating
AllMusic	3/5 stars

Can't Stop Dreaming is the fourth studio album by American singer Daryl Hall. It was originally released in 1996 by RCA and BMG as a limited collector's edition with 12 tracks in Japan and was subsequently released in the United States on June 10, 2003, by independent label Liquid 8, albeit missing one of its original tracks ("Something About You"), which was featured on the 2002 Hall & Oates album, Do It for Love. Despite this, all versions of the album contain a remake of the popular Hall & Oates song "She's Gone".

== Track listing ==
==== Original release ====
No.	Title	Writer(s)	Length
1.	"Can't Stop Dreaming"	Daryl Hall; Alan Gorrie; Walter Afanasieff; Dan Shea	4:14
2.	"Let Me Be the One"	Hall; Gorrie; Melvin "Wah Wah" Regin	4:55
3.	"Something About You"	Hall; Sara Allen; Bellochio	4:00
4.	"Cab Driver"	Hall; Gorrie; Louis Brown	5:22
5.	"Never Let Me Go"	Hall; Gorrie; Arthur Baker	4:29
6.	"Holding Out for Love"	Hall; Gorrie	3:57
7.	"Justify"	Hall; Brown	3:58
8.	"What's in Your World"	Hall; Gorrie; Brown; Scott Parker	5:50
9.	"Hold On to Me"	Hall; Gorrie; Allen; Afanasieff	4:36
10.	"She's Gone"	Hall; John Oates	5:16
11.	"All by Myself"	Hall; Gorrie	5:00
12.	"Fools Rush In"	Hall; Gorrie; Bellochio	4:23
Total length:			56:03

==== 2003 reissue ====
No.	Title	Writer(s)	Length
1.	"Cab Driver"	Hall; Gorrie; Brown	5:23
2.	"Let Me Be the One"	Hall; Gorrie; Regin	4:56
3.	"Can't Stop Dreaming"	Hall; Gorrie; Afanasieff; Shea	4:13
4.	"Never Let Me Go"	Hall; Gorrie; Baker	4:30
5.	"Holding Out for Love"	Hall; Gorrie	3:58
6.	"Justify"	Hall; Brown	3:58
7.	"What's in Your World"	Hall; Gorrie; Brown; Parker	5:51
8.	"Hold On to Me"	Hall; Gorrie; Allen; Afanasieff	4:36
9.	"She's Gone"	Hall; Oates	5:17
10.	"All by Myself"	Hall; Gorrie	5:02
11.	"Fools Rush In"	Hall; Gorrie; Bellochio	4:23
Total length:			52:06

== Singles ==
The album's lead single, "Cab Driver", did not chart on the Hot 100 in the US, but it did reach No. 21 on the Adult Contemporary chart in September 2003, staying there for four consecutive weeks and remaining on the chart for 13 weeks.

The next single, "What's in Your World", went to number 27 on the Adult Contemporary chart for one week on July 3, 2004, and remained on the chart for eight weeks.

== Personnel ==
==== Musicians ====
- Daryl Hall – lead vocals, backing vocals, keyboards
- David Bellochio – keyboards (1–3, 5–12), drums (1, 5, 6)
- Dan Shea – piano (1)
- Louis "Buster" Brown – keyboards (4, 7, 8)
- Scott "Shovani" Parker – keyboards (4, 7, 8)
- Paul Livant – guitars (1, 3, 5, 6, 10, 11)
- Craig Ross – guitars (2, 12)
- Alan Gorrie – guitars (4)
- Melvin "Wah Wah" Regin – guitars (4, 11)
- Bob Mayo – acoustic guitar (6)
- Ray Fuller – guitars (7)
- Dann Huff – guitars (8, 9)
- Jack Daley – electric bass (1–3, 6–12)
- Tom "T-Bone" Wolk – electric bass (10)
- Steve Wolf – drums (2, 3, 12)
- Jerry Krenach – drums (9, 11)
- Rupert Brown – drum programming (10)
- Peter Moshay – percussion (2, 3, 5–7, 9, 11, 12)
- Andy Snitzer – saxophone (2)
- Roger Ball – saxophone (4)
- Sandy B – backing vocals (2)
- Klyde Jones – backing vocals (2, 8, 9)
- Lajuan Carter – backing vocals (8, 9)
- Alexis England – backing vocals (8, 9)

==== Technical ====
- Produced by Daryl Hall (1–9, 11, 12), David Bellochio (1–3, 5–9, 11, 12), Walter Afanasieff (1, 8, 9), Buster & Shovani (4, 7, 8, 11), and Mike Peden (10)
- Engineered by Peter Moshay, Frank Fagnano (1, 7–9, 11), and Dana Jon Chappelle (1, 8, 9)
- Mixed by Peter Moshay
- Mastered by Bob Ludwig at Gateway Mastering (Portland, Maine)
- Package design – Phillips Design
- Photography – David A. Stewart
- Management – All Access Entertainment Management Group, Inc.

== Charts ==
Chart (2003)	Peak position
US Independent Albums (Billboard)	28
