= A Very Fine Love =

Studio album by Dusty Springfield
- Released: 20 June 1995
- Recorded: January – April 1994 in Nashville, Tennessee, US
- Genre: Pop, soul
- Length: 41:01
- Label: Columbia
- Producer: Tom Shapiro

Dusty Springfield chronology
Reputation (1990)	A Very Fine Love (1995)	Faithful (2015)

Singles from A Very Fine Love
- 1. "Wherever Would I Be" Released: 1995; 2. "Roll Away" Released: 1995

A Very Fine Love is the fourteenth studio album recorded by singer Dusty Springfield, and thirteenth released. Recorded in 1994 with producer Tom Shapiro and released on 20 June 1995 in the US and six days later in the UK. It was a Columbia Records release in both countries, and Springfield's first such simultaneous release since Living Without Your Love in 1979.

== Background ==
The album was originally tentatively called Dusty in Nashville, to tie in with the 25th anniversary of Dusty Springfield's keynote work Dusty in Memphis, but her record company "decided against it, in the belief that it would lead audiences to mistakenly expect a country album. A Very Fine Love was to be promoted by the TV documentary Full Circle, a 90-minute career retrospective featuring British comedians Jennifer Saunders and Dawn French interviewing Springfield in their inimitably irreverent way – Springfield herself was a big fan of French & Saunders' and their goonish sense of humor – as well as interviews with friends, fans and colleagues such as the Pet Shop Boys' Neil Tennant, Dionne Warwick, Burt Bacharach, Elvis Costello and Martha Reeves, and footage from the recording of the upcoming Nashville album.

During the three months of recording of the album, Springfield often had bouts of laryngitis and other undiagnosed health issues. Upon returning to England, she saw a specialist and was subsequently diagnosed with breast cancer. Upon learning Springfield was to undergo radiotherapy, her manager, Vicki Wickham, was able to convince Columbia Records to delay releasing A Very Fine Love until Springfield was well enough to do promotion work.

Springfield's cancer went into remission, and in June 1995, A Very Fine Love was released. It made little impact on the US album charts, but did reach No. 43 on the British charts. The title that got the best critical reception was the blues-tinged closing track "Where Is a Woman to Go?", written by Jerry Gillespie and K. T. Oslin and originally recorded by Dottie West in 1984, featuring guest vocals by Oslin (who had recorded the song herself in 1988) and Mary Chapin Carpenter. When promoting the album in the UK on TV-show Later With Jools Holland, Springfield performed the track live, backed by Sinéad O'Connor and Alison Moyet. One track from the album, "Wherever Would I Be", a Diane Warren-penned duet with Daryl Hall was featured in the movie While You Were Sleeping, and was a minor chart hit in Britain, along with Will Jennings' gospel-flavoured "Roll Away", the last charting single of her lifetime. The album also included the Warren-penned song "Lovin' Proof", originally recorded by Celine Dion for her The Colour of My Love album two years previously.

Due to modest sales of the album, Columbia Records did not pick up an option for renewing Springfield's contract. Springfield's cancer recurred in late 1996, and she died in 1999; A Very Fine Love represents the final studio album released during Springfield's lifetime.

== Release ==
A 2-disc expanded collector's edition of A Very Fine Love was released by Cherry Red Records in October 2016. The first disc features the entire album, two bonus tracks from the "Wherever Would I Be" single, and disc 2 contains promotional videos for "Roll Away" and "Wherever Would I Be", respectively.

== Critical reception ==
Professional ratings
Review scores
Source	Rating
AllMusic	3.5/5 stars
NME	6/10

Upon its release, Sarra Manning of Melody Maker called A Very Fine Love Springfield's "Nashville" album, with "loads of duff, cod country songs without any discernible tunes, a faux sincere duet with Daryl Hall and lots of histrionic guitar twiddling from session musicians". She concluded, "Sort it out, girl – you don't sound like Dusty no more, you sound like some ageing nightclub artiste doing a Karaoke Dusty." David Quantick of NME considered it to be "beautifully made soul-pop with a couple of country-style moments" and noted Springfield can "still sing better than anyone else". However, he also felt it was "fairly boring" and commented that the majority of the album is "nice tunes from the American Hit Parade heartland that are only memorable because you seem to have heard them before on other pleasantly forgettable albums".

== Track listing ==
1. "Roll Away" (Will Jennings, Martee Lebow) – 4:13
2. "Very Fine Love" a.k.a. "Fine, Fine, Very Fine Love" (Bob DiPiero, Jim Photoglo) – 4:10
3. "Wherever Would I Be" (Duet with Daryl Hall) (Diane Warren) – 3:51
4. "Go Easy on Me" (Randy Goodrum, John Jarvis) – 5:35
5. "You Are the Storm" (Matraca Berg, Ronnie Samoset) – 4:15
6. "I Can't Help the Way I Don't Feel" (Tom Shapiro, Chris Waters, Michael Garvin) – 3:40
7. "All I Have to Offer You Is Love" (Craig Wiseman) – 3:48
8. "Lovin' Proof" (Diane Warren) – 3:42
9. "Old Habits Die Hard" (Terry Britten, Graham Lyle) – 3:36
10. "Where Is a Woman to Go?" (Jerry Gillespie, K.T. Oslin) – 4:09

== Personnel ==
=== Musicians ===
- Dusty Springfield – lead vocals
- Daryl Hall – vocals ("Wherever Would I Be?")
- Mary Chapin Carpenter – vocals ("Where Is a Woman to Go?")
- K.T. Oslin – vocals ("Where Is a Woman to Go?")
- Kristina Clark – backing vocals
- Kim Fleming – backing vocals
- Sandy Griffith – backing vocals
- Ron Hemby – backing vocals
- Skyler Jett – backing vocals
- Conesha Owens – backing vocals
- Guy Penrod – backing vocals
- Claytoven Richardson – backing vocals
- John Wesley Ryles – backing vocals
- Audrey Sheeler – backing vocals
- Judson Spence – backing vocals
- Jeannie Tracy-Smith – backing vocals
- Cindy Richardson Walker – backing vocals
- Audrey Wheeler – backing vocals
- Chris Willis – backing vocals
- Dennis Wilson – backing vocals
- Simon Bell – backing vocals
- Lonnie Wilson – drums
- Terry Lee McMillan – percussion
- Glenn Worf – bass guitar
- Brian Tankersley – bass guitar, keyboards, drum programming, synthesizer bass
- Walter Afanasieff – programming
- Gary Cirimelli – programming, backing vocals
- George Cocchini – electric guitar
- Dan Dugmore – steel guitar
- Dann Huff – guitar, electric guitar, rhythm guitar, classical guitar
- Jerry McPherson – electric guitar
- Michael Thompson – rhythm guitar
- Biff Watson – guitar, acoustic guitar
- John Jarvis – piano, keyboards
- Carl Marsh – keyboards
- Steve Nathan – keyboards, Hammond organ
- Kirk Whalum – soprano saxophone

=== Production ===
- Tom Shapiro – producer, musical arranger
- Brian Tankersley – associate producer, engineer, mixing
- Jan Perry – assistant producer
- Walter Afanasieff – arranger, co-producer ("Wherever Would I Be", Walter A. Mix)
- Dana Jon Chappelle – sound engineer, mixing
- Jay Healy – sound engineer
- Greg Parker – assistant engineer
- Bill O'Donovan – assistant engineer
- Wayne Morgan – assistant engineer
- Shawn McLean – assistant engineer
- John Kliner – assistant engineer
- Steve Ledet – assistant engineer
- Mick Guzauski – mixing
- David Gleeson – mixing assistant
- Craig Silvey – mixing assistant
- Mike Scott – mixing assistant
- Hank Williams – mastering
- John Geary – illustrations
- Recorded at Javelina Recording Studios, The Bennett House, Recording Arts, Woodland Digital, Eleven Eleven Sound, GBT Studio (Nashville), and Bill Schnee Studios (Hollywood): late January – early April 1994.

== Charts ==
Chart performance for A Very Fine Love
Chart (1995)	Peak position
UK Albums (OCC)	43

== Bibliography ==
- Howes, Paul (2001). The Complete Dusty Springfield; London: Reynolds & Hearn Ltd. ISBN 1-903111-24-2
