= Whole Oats =

1972 studio album by Hall & Oates

Studio album by Daryl Hall & John Oates
- Released: September 1972
- Recorded: May 1972
- Studios: Atlantic Recording Studios, New York City, U.S.
- Genres: Soul; blue-eyed soul; folk
- Length: 38:08
- Label: Atlantic
- Producer: Arif Mardin

Daryl Hall & John Oates chronology
Whole Oats (1972)	Abandoned Luncheonette (1973)

Singles from Whole Oats
- 1. "Goodnight and Goodmorning / All Our Love" Released: 1972

Professional ratings
Review scores
Source	Rating
AllMusic	3/5 stars

Whole Oats is the debut studio album by American pop rock duo Daryl Hall & John Oates. The album was released in September 1972, by Atlantic Records.

The duo consisted of Daryl Hall and John Oates, both of Philadelphia. Prior to making this album, the duo made numerous demos, some of which were released on the Past Times Behind & Vintage collections. It was released on CD for the second time on February 12, 2008 by American Beat Records, putting it back in print after the original Atlantic Records CD release went out of print. On February 24, 2017, Friday Music released a remastered version of the album along with their third studio album, War Babies.

== Track listing ==
All tracks are written by Daryl Hall, except where noted.

Side one
No.	Title	Writer(s)	Length
1.	"I'm Sorry"	Hall; John Oates	3:06
2.	"All Our Love"	Hall; Oates	2:41
3.	"Georgie"		2:42
4.	"Fall in Philadelphia"		3:58
5.	"Waterwheel"		3:52
6.	"Lazyman"		3:15

Side two
No.	Title	Writer(s)	Length
7.	"Goodnight and Goodmorning"	Hall; Oates	3:18
8.	"They Needed Each Other"		3:59
9.	"Southeast City Window"	Oates	2:31
10.	"Thank You For..."	Oates	4:36
11.	"Lilly (Are You Happy)"	Hall; Oates	4:10
Total length:			38:08

== Personnel ==
- Daryl Hall – lead vocals (1–8, 11), backing vocals, keyboards, synthesizer, guitars, mandolin, vibraphone, arrangements, cello (9), arrangements (9)
- John Oates – lead vocals (2, 9–11), backing vocals, guitars, arrangements
- Jerry Ricks – guitar (9)
- Bill Keith – pedal steel guitar (2, 9)
- Mike McCarthy – bass
- Jim Helmer – drums, percussion
- Arif Mardin – horn and string arrangements

=== Technical ===
- Produced by Arif Mardin
- Recorded and engineered by Lewis Hahn and Gene Paul
- Mixed by Gene Paul
- Art direction and design – Richard Mantel
- Photography – John Paul Endress
