= Oscar Klein =

Austrian jazz musician

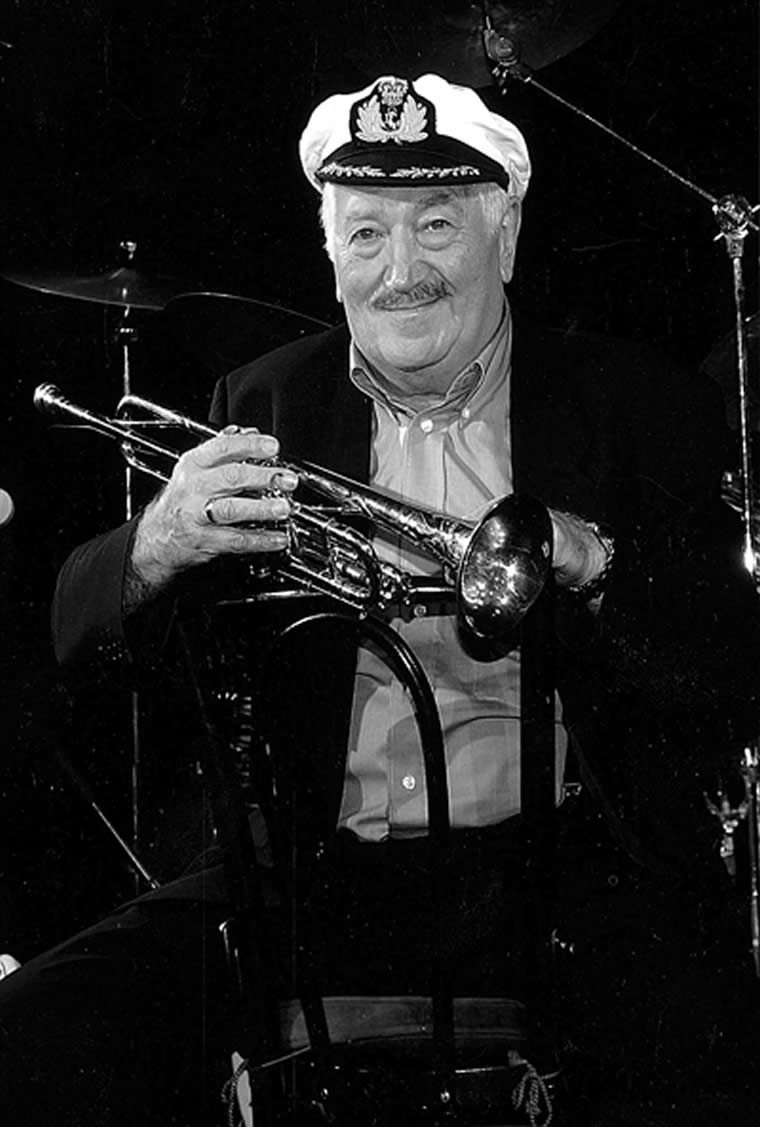
Oscar Klein 2004

Oscar Klein (5 January 1930 in Graz, Austria – 12 December 2006 in Baden-Württemberg) was an Austrian born jazz trumpeter who also played clarinet, harmonica, and swing guitar. His family fled the Nazis when he was young. He became known for "older jazz" like swing and Dixieland. In the early sixties he joined the famous Dutch Swing College Band in the Netherlands as first trumpeter and played on several of their recordings. He played with Lionel Hampton, Joe Zawinul, Jerry Ricks and others. In 1996 he was honored by the Austrian President Thomas Klestil.
