= War Babies (Hall & Oates album) =

1974 studio album by Daryl Hall & John Oates

Studio album by Daryl Hall & John Oates
- Released: October 9, 1974
- Recorded: June 19–July 4, 1974
- Studio: Secret Sound Studios (New York)
- Genres: Progressive rock; hard rock; experimental rock; heavy metal; blue-eyed soul
- Length: 43:16
- Label: Atlantic
- Producer: Todd Rundgren

Daryl Hall & John Oates chronology
Abandoned Luncheonette (1973)	War Babies (1974)	Daryl Hall & John Oates (1975)

Singles from War Babies
- 1. "Can't Stop The Music (He Played It Much Too Long)" Released: November 1974

War Babies is the third studio album by American pop rock duo Daryl Hall & John Oates, released on October 9, 1974. It was the duo's final album for Atlantic Records, and was produced by rock musician Todd Rundgren, who also plays guitar on the album, alongside members of his band Utopia.

Wishing for a stylistic change from the Philly soul and blue-eyed soul that had characterised their prior work, Hall and Oates conceived War Babies as a radical, experimental departure, mixing progressive rock, hard rock and R&B into an urban-oriented style with heavy synthesizer work. A loose concept album, the album was inspired by the perils of touring and the struggles of baby boomers, with Rundgren and the duo aiming to achieve a bleakness reflective of growing up in the nuclear age. Further inspirations on the album included glam rock and David Bowie, who the duo opened for in 1973.

On release, the album reached number 86 on the Billboard Top LPs and Tape chart, becoming their first charting album, but was deemed a commercial failure, leading to the duo being dropped by Atlantic. It alienated music critics and fans of the duo who expected softer music comparable to their earlier records. Hall and Oates subsequently signed to RCA Records for their breakthrough album Daryl Hall & John Oates (1975), which abandoned the experimentation of War Babies for a more mainstream sound. War Babies was re-released in 2017.

== Background ==
Daryl Hall and John Oates recorded their first two albums with venerated producer Arif Mardin, with their second album—the folk-soul release Abandoned Luncheonette (1973)—achieving the American hit single "She's Gone". However, for War Babies, Hall and Oates switched producers from Mardin to Todd Rundgren, a decision that Hall later said "didn't make sense. But 'She's Gone' wasn't a real hit until 1975, so we had no reason to stay put. People talk about Abandoned Luncheonette as this groundbreaking album but we felt like an obscurity at the time. Why not take a chance?"

The switch from Mardin to Rundgren saw the duo abandon the style of Abandoned Luncheonette, which fused acoustic pop with Philly soul. Hall believed that although the duo embodied the 'Philly sound', having worked with Thom Bell and Gamble & Huff, they separated themselves by placing their "soul roots and street-corner gospel harmonies into other contexts. War Babies was the first and most extreme example. Taking something familiar, and heading to Mars. And sometimes Mars is a good place, and sometimes a cold place. That album represents both." Another motivation for the duo's stylistic change was their experiences with glam rock, particularly when supporting David Bowie on his 1973 Ziggy Stardust Tour of the United States. Hall said: "We sounded very musical and grounded, and he came on like Godzilla. We realised we could kick ass a lot harder."

Rundgren, similarly to Hall and Oates a Philadelphian, was enjoying the belated success of Something/Anything? (1972) when asked to work on War Babies. According to Chris Charlesworth, the material Hall and Oates were writing for War Babies was closer to rock than soul, thus Rundgren was deemed suitable to produce. Oates later said that he believed Rundgren would be "sympathetic to the kind of thing we were trying to do", as War Babies is "a very urban-orientated album" that mixes R&B with progressive rock, "and that's what we thought Rundgren was involved with then." Hall reflected that Rundgren was "on the same wave length" as the duo, adding: "He has a very urban New York electronic thing. We couldn't think of anyone else who could actually simulate what a monitor beam sounds like when it scans, or portray that visual image on a record." The music writer Max Bell wrote that Rundgren encouraged Hall and Oates "to go quasi-metal" for the album.

== Recording ==
Rundgren has said that, during the pre-production discussions and upon listening to the War Babies demos, he noticed that Hall and Oates had not settled on a direction. Considering "She's Gone" to be relatively atypical of the duo's work up to that point, because their previous albums were eclectic, he believed that the duo were "possibly chafing at the idea that they only would be able to do one kind of music. So coming into the record that became War Babies, the material already had an experimental and exploratory quality. They were on the cusp of deciding what direction to go in and War Babies gave them all kinds of opportunities and places that they wouldn't go later!"

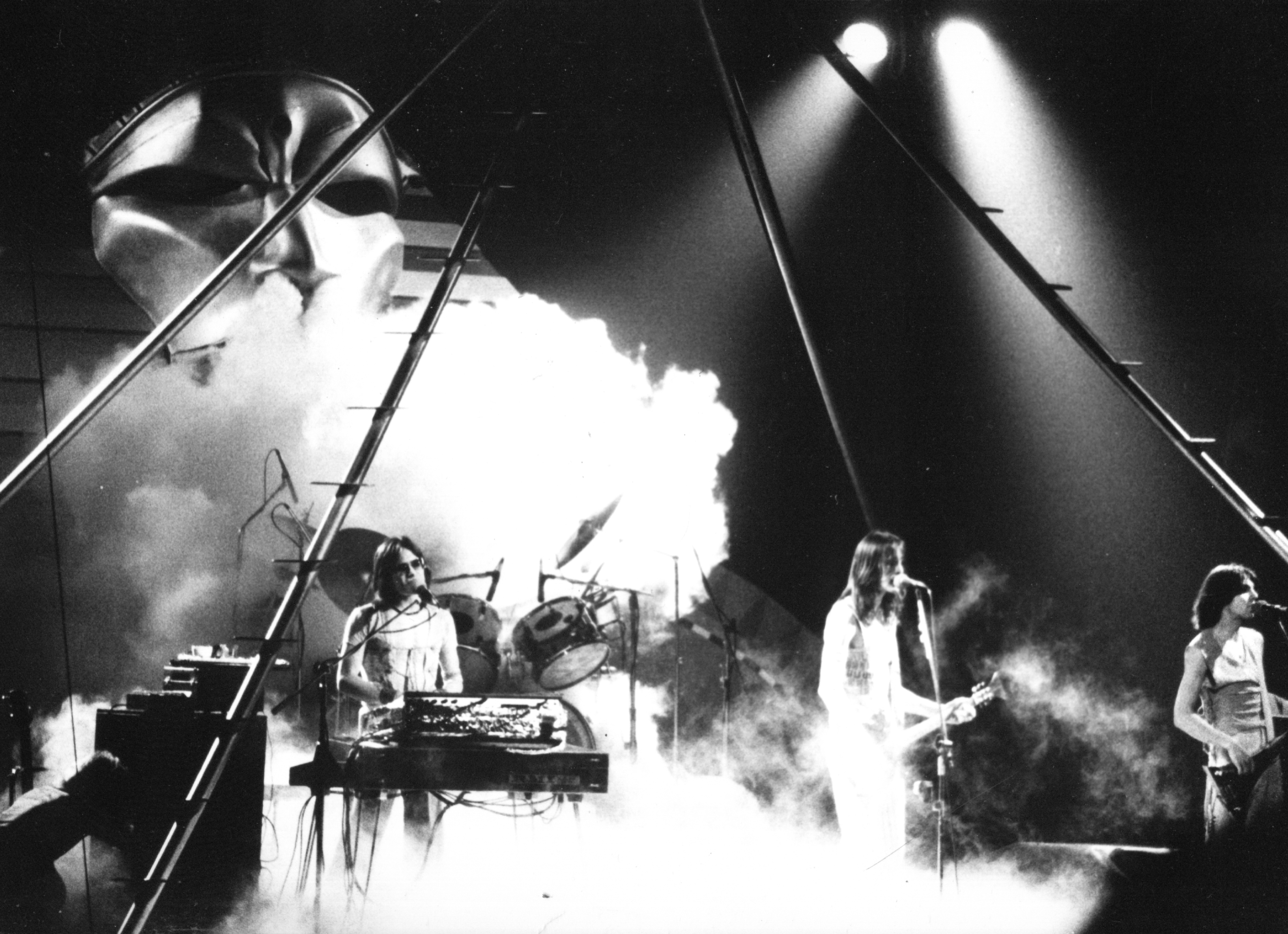
Members of Utopia (pictured in 1977) played on War Babies.

War Babies was recorded over two months from June 19 to July 4, 1974, at New York City's Secret Sound Studios, the same location that Rundgren recorded the albums Todd and Todd Rundgren's Utopia (both 1974). The producer found working with Hall and Oates undemanding and was impressed with their skills, singing and eagerness to experiment. He said that using his own studio for the record allowed Hall and Oates to be "more experimental", later saying: "Often I was trying to interpret ideas into techniques we could use to get what they wanted, like an echo on the voice, a certain kind of keyboard tone or an especially watery sound." Rundgren received a 'supervised' credit on the sleeve, which Hall indicated meant that his drug use was higher than anyone else's during the recording.

Musicians on the album include members of Rundgren's group Utopia, as well as Rundgren himself on guitar. Drummer John "Willie" Wilcox made his recording studio debut with War Babies. It was the first meeting between Rundgren and Wilcox, and after touring with Hall and Oates in promotion of War Babies, Wilcox joined Utopia for their live album Another Live (1975). Also appearing on War Babies was Hall's future girlfriend Sandy Allen, who sings with Hall on the eccentric songs "War Baby, Son of Zorro" and "Johnny Gore and the 'C' Eaters". The final album was mastered by Jean Ristori at Sterling Sound.

== Composition ==
=== Musical styles and themes ===
Described by Oates as an urban-sounding mix of R&B and progressive rock that the duo made for their own pleasure, War Babies eschewed the blue-eyed soul of Hall and Oates' first two records in favour of "a more keyboard-heavy hard rock sound", according to the music journalist Bryan Rolli, while Kris Nicholson of Circus writes that Hall and Oates used War Babies to display "their ability to be creative outside the limits of R&B". The music critic Martin Aston, however, argues that it represents an extreme form of blue-eyed soul. Paul Lester described the album as the duo's "freak-funk metal experiment", one characterised by "fully-fledged urban paranoia". (Note: In a 1988 Spin interview, Hall described War Babies as "a fucking weird hard rock [album].")

A loose concept album, War Babies is themed around the struggles and experiences of baby boomers and the perils of touring. Rundgren comments that much of the record's atmosphere was intended to reflect the bleakness of "growing up in the nuclear age and how it had characterised the attitude of a generation", thus resulting in a "cultural manifesto" that stood in stark contrast to the light pop music that Hall and Oates had created before. The music reviewer Ian Birch characterises the album's unusual concept as "the Bomb Culture years siphoned through a '70's Scenario of rock, television and war." The reviewer Max Bell describes the lyrics as exhibiting "cleverness", with songs focused on antiheroes, while music critic Martin Aston contends that War Babies balances "New York paranoia" (as on "Better Watch Your Back" and "I'm Watching You (A Mutant Romance)") with themes of tour-induced psychosis.

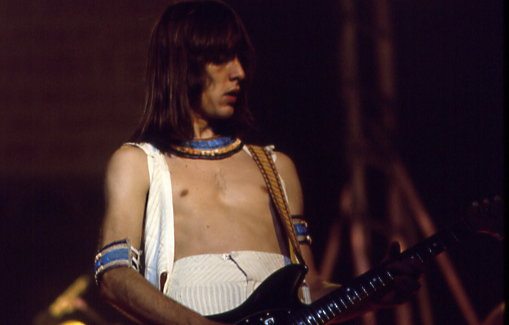
War Babies is dominated by the production of Todd Rundgren, who also plays guitar on the album.

Bell opined that Rundgren dominates the album, to the extent that Hall and Oates do not always strongly exert their presence, and highlights "Beanie G. and the Rose Tattoo" in particular for its "Runtish aura", with Rundgren's "scorched" electric guitar on the song evoking his work with the band Nazz. "70's Scenario" and "I'm Watching You (A Mutant Romance)" particularly display Rundgren's involvement, and generally throughout the album, Hall and Oates' vocals and melodies are obscured beneath Rundgren's harsh stylizations.

Musical influences on the record include David Bowie and King Crimson. Birch compared War Babies to the contemporary work of Bowie, noting that "I'm Watching You (A Mutant Romance)", in which a surveillance monitor is secretly in love with a prostitute, is comparable to Bowie's Diamond Dogs (1974), while adding that a persistent theme throughout War Babies is the "obsessive power" of television; he cites the TV quiz show snippet (recorded impromptu in the studio during its broadcast) which was inserted into "War Baby, Son of Zorro" instead of a guitar solo as being comparable to the excess of televisions watched simultaneously by Bowie's character in The Man Who Fell to Earth (1976). Hall commented at the time that television was the group's biggest influence. In Smash Hits, Birch wrote that War Babies "dipped into the same type of brittle, urban soul that Bowie was experimenting with [in the same period]."

=== Songs ===
War Babies opens with "Can't Stop the Music (He Played It Much Too Long)", written solely by Oates (who was inspired by his reservations around touring). It concerns an aging rock performer who has forgotten much about his musical prime. It segues into "Is It a Star", whose echoed drum machine marks the first use of the instrument on a Hall and Oates song; it would later become a staple of the duo's sound. "Better Watch Your Back" is an acoustic funk song while "I'm Watching You (A Mutant Romance)" is a ballad concerning a surveillance camera operator.

Considered the album's centrepiece, "War Baby, Son of Zorro" has a heavy arrangement with phased guitar, dominant synthesisers, synth-treated vocals and television sound effects. Paul Myers describes it as a "musical collage" of Hall, Oates and Rundgren's shared memories of childhood during the Cold War in the 1950s. Reflecting on the track, Rundgren contends that he and the duo had no intention of "making anything resembling a pop song; this was high-concept music".

"Screaming Through December" was described by Aston as the album's "glam-soul opus", deeming it to be a "four-verse diary of broken souls and automobile chaos." Despite being bookended by Hall's unusual, psychedelic descriptions of touring life, the track is otherwise instrumental and the longest cut on the album. Bryan Bierman of Magnet considers it to be "possibly the most radical departure" in Hall and Oates' career, highlighting its funky, progressive sound and the lengthy mid-track breakdown centred around Rundgren's guitar, bassist John Siegler and drummer Willie Wilcox.

== Release and promotion ==
Hall and Oates' record label, Atlantic Records, were mystified by War Babies, and the duo's manager Tommy Mottola told them: "Make another record like this and you'll never make another again." According to Rundgren, Atlantic were expecting a "much more conservative" album of blue-eyed soul and wrongly believed that Rundgren—who had dabbled in that style on his own albums—would "steer them in that direction". He adds that he believed that Hall wanted to be an experimental artist like Bowie and repeatedly record unique albums, but Atlantic "gave the record a tepid response and didn't work hard to promote it." Released on October 9, 1974, War Babies was nevertheless the duo's first charting album, reaching number 86 on the Billboard Top LPs and Tape chart. "Can't Stop the Music (He Played It Much Too Long)" was also released as a single in November, with "70's Scenario" on the B-side, but it did not chart.

Simultaneously, Hall and Oates began acquiring a cult following in the United Kingdom, where Abandoned Luncheonette was selling well as an import, so the release of War Babies in the UK was predicted by Bell to reach a wider audience. The album nevertheless did not chart in Britain. Following the release, Atlantic dropped the duo from their roster, with Mottola blaming Rundgren for what he perceived as the record's artistic and commercial disappointment. According to Hall, the duo were dropped in favor of the funk group the Average White Band. On February 24, 2017, Friday Music released a remastered version of the album along with the duo's first studio outing, Whole Oats (1972).

== Critical reception ==
Professional ratings
Review scores
Source	Rating
AllMusic	3.5/5 stars
The Encyclopedia of Popular Music	2/5 stars
The Great Rock Discography	4/10
The Rolling Stone Album Guide	2/5 stars

War Babies was met with a hostile response. According to the author Frank Moriarty, it was an esoteric album "that was greeted with dismay by fans who expected more of the soft rhythm and blues with which the duo had established their career." In his Rolling Stone review, Bud Scoppa called it a "jarringly disappointing album" which discards the sweet vocals, full arrangements and sentimental lyrics that characterised Abandoned Lunchonettte in favor of "a tough, big-city stance that sounds both forced and perverse." He deemed it a shrill and effect-ridden LP with both the sound and material at fault, noting: "It's extremely rare for still growing artists to show this disdain for the audience they've managed to win."

Robert Duncan of Creem was interested by Rundgren's domination of the record's content and production, adding: "Speaking strictly in terms of the music, the album might be able to stand alone without the True Star. But it sure sounds like some of those nifty riffs and syncopations were shots in the ass from Todd. As really shows in the lyrics, these boys can get a bit self-indulgent and trite." However, he notes that the album sometimes contains catchy material and "vital, sometimes haunting music" which gets obscured by Rundgren's excesses. In his review for New Musical Express, Max Bell described War Babies as a "bona-fide goodie" which "maybe having worked on it will rescue Rundgren from the Utopia he's unfortunately ensconced in. With this sort of competition, it will need to."

Ian Birch, writing retrospectively for Sounds, described the "underrated" War Babies as the duo's least consistent but most rewarding album. Martin C. Strong, writing in The Great Rock Discography (2006), describes the album as "a heavier, more experimental set" whose commercial failure "marked the end of [the duo's] ill-fated tenure with Atlantic." In his review for AllMusic, Stephen Thomas Erlewine notes the rock-oriented material marked a stylistic departure for the duo and stated: "Some of the tracks work, but the duo's performance sounds forced throughout much of the record." In his review for Magnet, Bryan Bierman described War Babies as "a unique highlight for the duo, and a weird detour on their road to master pop music."

== Legacy ==
Having been dropped from Atlantic, Hall and Oates signed to RCA Records for their subsequent album, Daryl Hall & John Oates (1975), which proved to be their breakthrough release. It featured a more mainstream sound than War Babies. Hall noted that the duo "calmed down" after recording War Babies because it had been "completely untimely" and "was too real, too close to what was happening outside and people were getting into the disco craze. Everyone was into forgetting about the world's troubles. So for the first time we became a little more concerned with selling records. Not make heavy statements, just good music." Oates commented in 1976 that the duo were not intending to work again in "the electronic area" that had typified War Babies, instead wishing to "stay more in the area we're in and try and lead people a little more gently", using electronic instruments in a subtler manner.

In 2016, Hall described the record as "so ridiculous, it makes me laugh. But it is incomparable and free-spirited, an outsider mood as raucous as the environment it was made in. I got that out of my system. It was chaotic. We sounded like demented squirrels." Interviewed for Phonograph Record, Hall described War Babies as a culmination and that the duo "basically were doing whatever we wanted to, but that was a turning point. The culmination of not paying attention. We realized that it was our pleasure or the commercial field. So our [self-titled] album was our first concession to that, to thinking about what people actually expected from us." In 2005, Hall believed that the duo could have become "a bit edgier through the years if War Babies had sold — which it didn't." In her Creem piece, Whithall reflected that "it seems to be assumed that if Babies had hit it big, that hard-edged Delaware Valley sound would have been with Hall & Oates a bit longer."

In 2024, Ultimate Classic Rock ranked War Babies at number 39 in their list of the top 50 albums of 1974. Martin Aston of Mojo describes the "practically forgotten" War Babies as representing the fullest expression of the "glam-smitten, acid-laced and frazzled kind of blue-eyed soul" that Hall and Oates explored at the time. In Record Collector, Max Bell described War Babies as "a crazed train wreck of an album" and a "screaming, mutant, discordant mess", adding that it was Hall and Oates' "most experimental early work." He recommends the album to those who "want to imagine a climate where blue-eyed soul gets slaughtered by disgusto-heroin chic". Paul Lester of Uncut credits the album's "crazed electro-distorted soul" for anticipating Lewis Taylor's eponymous 1996 album. In 1982, Susan Whitall of Creem wrote that fans of the album were pleased that the duo had "[surrounded] themselves with strange noises" on their 1980s hits. Marcello Carlin of Uncut groups War Babies with Hall's avant-garde solo album Sacred Songs (1980) as "evidence of the grit beneath the shiny surfaces" of the duo's sound.

== Track listing ==
All tracks are written by Daryl Hall, except where noted.

Side one
No.	Title	Writer(s)	Length
1.	"Can't Stop the Music (He Played It Much Too Long)"	John Oates	2:49
2.	"Is It a Star"	Hall; Oates	4:45
3.	"Beanie G. and the Rose Tattoo"		3:00
4.	"You're Much Too Soon"		4:07
5.	"70's Scenario"		3:57

Side two
No.	Title	Writer(s)	Length
6.	"War Baby Son of Zorro"		4:10
7.	"I'm Watching You (A Mutant Romance)"		4:22
8.	"Better Watch Your Back"		4:14
9.	"Screaming Through December"		6:31
10.	"Johnny Gore and the ‘C’ Eaters"	Hall; Oates	5:21
Total length:			43:16

== Personnel ==
=== Musicians ===
- Daryl Hall – lead vocals (3–10), backing vocals, keyboards, mandolin, arrangements
- John Oates – lead vocals (1, 2, 10), backing vocals, guitar, arrangements
- Todd Rundgren – lead guitar, synthesizers, backing vocals
- Don York – keyboards, synthesizers, arrangements (2), ARP String Ensemble (5)
- John Siegler – bass
- John G. Wilcox – drums

==== Additional musicians ====
- Rich Cerniglia – lead guitar (2)
- Gail Boggs – backing vocals (6, 10)
- Sara Allen – backing vocals (6, 10)
- Hello People – backing vocals (10)
- "Admiral Television" – "solo" (6)
- Tommy Mottola – "erased Conelrad warning" (6)

=== Technical ===
- Produced, engineered, and supervised by Todd Rundgren
- Mastered by Jean Ristori at Sterling Sound (New York City, NY)
- Studio assistance – Gene Perla and David LaSage
- Cover illustration – Peter Palombi
- Liner photography – Armin Kachaturian
- Inner sleeve photo – David Gahr
- Art direction – Bob Defrin
