= X-Static =

1979 studio album by Hall & Oates

Studio album by Daryl Hall & John Oates
- Released: October 11, 1979
- Recorded: 1979
- Studios: Hit Factory (New York City); Sunset Sound (Los Angeles)
- Genres: Disco; rock; pop
- Length: 40:41
- Label: RCA Victor
- Producer: David Foster

Daryl Hall & John Oates chronology
Along the Red Ledge (1978)	X-Static (1979)	Voices (1980)

Singles from X-Static
- 1. "Wait for Me" Released: 1979; 2. "Running from Paradise" Released: 1980; 3. "Who Said The World Was Fair" Released: 1980; 4. "Portable Radio" Released: 1980

X-Static is the eighth studio album by American pop music duo Daryl Hall & John Oates. The album was released in October 11, 1979 by RCA Records. Like their last album, Along the Red Ledge, it was produced by David Foster. Buddah Records re-released the album with two bonus tracks in 2000.

"Wait for Me" reached number 18 on the Billboard charts and won a BMI airplay award. The second single, "Running from Paradise", peaked at No. 41 in the UK Singles Chart on July 12, 1980, just missing out on the Top 40. The album peaked at No. 33 on the Billboard 200.

== Critical reception ==
Professional ratings
Review scores
Source	Rating
AllMusic	3.5/5 stars
The Rolling Stone Album Guide	2.5/5 stars

The Globe and Mail noted that much of the album "tries a little too hard to be an out-and-out dance album, with grunge like 'Portable Radio' and 'Intravino' hopping along on rock/disco beats we could easily get from less talented artists."

== Track listing ==
Side one
No.	Title	Writer(s)	Length
1.	"The Woman Comes and Goes"	Daryl Hall	3:49
2.	"Wait for Me"	Hall	4:08
3.	"Portable Radio"	Hall; John Oates	4:46
4.	"All You Want Is Heaven"	Oates	4:03
5.	"Who Said the World Was Fair"	Hall; Sara Allen	4:10

Side two
No.	Title	Writer(s)	Length
6.	"Running from Paradise"	Hall; Allen	6:38
7.	"Number One"	Hall	3:46
8.	"Bebop/Drop"	Oates	3:57
9.	"Hallofon"	Hall	1:21
10.	"Intravino"	Hall; Oates; Allen	3:35
Total length:			40:41

Buddha remaster bonus tracks
No.	Title	Writer(s)	Length
11.	"Time's Up (Alone Tonight)"	Hall; David Foster	3:16
12.	"No Brain, No Pain"	Hall; Allen	2:53
Total length:			46:31

== Personnel ==
=== The Band ===
- Daryl Hall – lead vocals (1–3, 5–7, 9–12), backing vocals, keyboards, Mandar, synthesizers, Hallophone
- John Oates – lead vocals (3, 4, 8), backing vocals, guitar
- David Foster – keyboards, synthesizers
- Jerry Marotta – drums
- G. E. Smith – lead guitar
- John Siegler – bass

==== Additional musicians ====
- Yogi Horton – drums
- Neil Jason – bass
- Kenny Passarelli – bass
- Werner Fritzsching – guitar
- Jay Graydon – guitar
- Steve Love – guitar
- Charlie DeChant – saxophone
- Jimmy Maelen – percussion
- Ralph Schuckett – organ
- Larry Fast – synthesizer programming
- Steve Porcaro – synthesizer programming
- George Bitzer – synthesizer programming

=== Technical ===
- Produced by David Foster (1–11) and Daryl Hall (12)
- Engineered by Ed Sprigg
- Assistant engineers – Jon Smith, Bruce Buchalter, David Leonard, Mark Linett
- Mixed by Humberto Gatica at Sunset Sound, Los Angeles, California
- Equipment – Keith Brewer
- Album cover – Kathy Hohl
- Photography – George Nakano

==== 2000 reissue ====
- Reissue producers – Jeremy Holiday and Rob Santos
- Mastering – Elliott Federman
- Digital transfers technician – Mike Harty
- Redesign – Pete Ciccone
- Product manager – John Huston
- Production assistance – Glenn Korman, Steve Strauss, Tom Tierney and Frank Ursoleo
- Project coordination – Arlessa Barnes, Stephanie Kika, Robin Manning, Donna Malyszko, Brooke Nochomson, Larry Parra, Dana Renert, Bill Stafford and Traci Werbel

== Singles ==
#	Title	US Hot 100	UK singles
1.	"Wait for Me"	18	—
2.	"Portable Radio'"	—	—
3.	"Who Said the World Was Fair"	110	—
4.	"Running from Paradise"	—	41
