= Wait for Me (Hall & Oates song) =

1979 song performed by Hall & Oates

Single by Hall & Oates

from the album X-Static
- B-side: "No Brain No Pain"
- Released: October 1979
- Genre: Rock; soul
- Length: 4:05
- Label: RCA Victor
- Songwriter: Daryl Hall
- Producer: David Foster

Hall & Oates singles chronology
"Running from Paradise" (1979)	"Wait for Me" (1979)	"Intravino" (1979)

Music video
- "Wait for Me" on YouTube

"Wait for Me" is a song performed by the American duo Hall & Oates. It was written by Daryl Hall and produced by David Foster. It was the lead single release from their eighth studio album, X-Static (1979).

A live version (Recorded live at the Montreal Forum in March, 1983) is featured on Hall & Oates' greatest hits album, Rock 'n Soul Part 1. This version highlights Hall's vocal range and stylings at the conclusion of the performance and has become a fan favorite.

Record World said the "dramatic chorus breaks add suspense to the irresistible hook."

== Chart performance ==
Chart (1979–1980)	Peak position
Canada RPM Top Singles	53
US Billboard Hot 100	18
US Billboard Adult Contemporary	23
US Radio & Records CHR/Pop Airplay Chart	25

Year-end chart (1980)	Rank
US Top Pop Singles (Billboard)	88
