= D (Daryl Hall album) =

Studio album by Daryl Hall
- Released: June 21, 2024
- Recorded: 2023–2024
- Studio: Stardust (Harbour Island, Bahamas)
- Length: 34:31
- Label: Virgin
- Producers: Daryl Hall; Dave Stewart

Daryl Hall chronology
BeforeAfter (2022)	D (2024)

D is the sixth solo album by American singer-songwriter Daryl Hall. Hall's first studio solo album after 11 years, it was released on June 21, 2024. Hall co-produced the album with former Eurythmics frontman Dave Stewart, who co-wrote seven of the nine songs. The album takes its name from Hall's nickname.

The album was recorded over a year and a half in Stewart's studio in Harbour Island, Bahamas, near where Hall has a house. The first single, "Can't Say No to You", was released on May 7, 2024.

== Track listing ==
All tracks are written by Daryl Hall and Dave Stewart, except where noted.

No.	Title	Writer(s)	Length
1.	"The Whole World's Better"	Hall; Stewart; Jelte van den Dungen	4:14
2.	"Too Much Information"		3:44
3.	"Can't Say No to You"		3:16
4.	"Rather Be a Fool"	Hall	3:57
5.	"Rainbow Over the Graveyard"		4:17
6.	"Not the Way I Thought It Was"		3:34
7.	"Walking in Between Raindrops"		4:38
8.	"Why You Want to Do That (To My Head)"		3:03
9.	"Break It Down to the Real Thing"	Hall	3:44
Total length:			34:31

== Personnel ==
Musicians

- Daryl Hall – lead and backing vocals, piano
- Dave Stewart – electric and acoustic guitar, electric bass (6), percussion (7), hand claps (3), background vocals (1)
- Tracy Barry – background vocals (1)
- Greg Bieck – background vocals (1), Omnichord (3, 4), Hammond Organ (5)
- Dayonna Brown – background vocals (1, 3, 9)
- Antonio Cartwright – hand claps (3, 9)
- Charlie DeChant – saxophone (8)
- Guerline Delien – background vocals (1)
- Darrell Freeman – bass synthesizer
- Hannah Koppenberg – synthesizer (7)
- Kaitlin Lederer – background vocals (1)
- Shaniqua Oliver – background vocals (3, 9)
- Rocky Saunders – electric guitar (5, 9)
- Jesse Samler – drums (4), percussion (5-7)
- Ersley Wilson – percussion (5, 9)
- Jaden McPhee – background vocals (1), hand claps (3, 9)
- Mivelyne – background vocals (1), hand claps (3, 9)
- Isabella Tyler – background vocals (1)

Production

- Daryl Hall – production, package design
- Dave Stewart – production, mixing, package design
- Greg Bieck – additional vocal production, engineering
- Jesse Samler – mixing, engineering
- David Leonard – mixing
- Ryan Smith – mastering
- Adam Grover – mastering
- Paul Norris – engineering (7)
- Kathy Phillips – package design

== Charts ==
Chart performance for D
Chart (2024)	Peak position
Scottish Albums (Official Charts)	54
UK Album Downloads (Official Charts)	65
