= Soul Alone =

Studio album by Daryl Hall
- Released: September 7, 1993
- Recorded: 1992–1993
- Studios: A-Pawling Studios (Pawling); Battery Studios (London); Little Yard Studio (London); The Hit Factory (London)
- Genres: Rock; pop; soul
- Length: 56:17
- Label: Epic
- Producers: Daryl Hall; Peter Lord Moreland; Michael Peden; V. Jeffrey Smith

Daryl Hall chronology
Three Hearts in the Happy Ending Machine (1986)	Soul Alone (1993)	Can't Stop Dreaming (1996)

Professional ratings
Review scores
Source	Rating
AllMusic	2.5/5 stars
Music Week	3/5 stars

Soul Alone is the third studio album by American singer and musician Daryl Hall, released in 1993 on Epic Records. Distinct from the sound of his successful duo Hall & Oates, this album features a more soulful and jazzy feel, with production by Hall with Peter Lord Moreland and V. Jeffrey Smith from R&B group The Family Stand, and Michael Peden. Soul Alone features singer Mariah Carey, Alan Gorrie from the Average White Band, and producer/multi-instrumentalist Walter Afanasieff as composers. Four singles were released from the album: "I'm in a Philly Mood," "Stop Loving Me, Stop Loving You," "Help Me Find a Way to Your Heart" and "Wildfire." The Japanese version of the album came with an extra 12th track, "I've Finally Seen the Light."

Songwriter Janna Allen, who co-composed "Written in Stone" (the only song on the album Hall didn't have a hand in writing), died two weeks before the album's release. In addition to being a longtime musical collaborator of Hall's, she was the sister of his longtime girlfriend Sara Allen.

== Singles ==
"I'm in a Philly Mood" was the first single released from the album, reaching number 82 on the US Billboard Hot 100 on October 2, 1993, and remaining on the chart for two weeks. It was also released as a single in the United Kingdom, reaching number 59 in the UK Singles Chart. "Stop Loving Me, Stop Loving You" was released as the second single from the album, reaching number 30 in the UK in 1994. This was followed by a re-release of "I'm in a Philly Mood", this time it reached number 52. The third single from the album, "Help Me Find a Way to Your Heart", co-written by Mariah Carey and Walter Afanasieff, reached number 70 in the UK. The fourth and final single to be released from the album, "Wildfire", reached number 99 in the UK Singles Chart.

== Track listing ==
No.	Title	Writer(s)	Length
1.	"Power of Seduction"	Daryl Hall; Peter Lord Moreland; V. Jeffrey Smith	5:50
2.	"This Time"	Hall; Sara Allen; Moreland; Smith	4:58
3.	"Love Revelation"	Hall; Moreland; Smith; Alan Gorrie	4:35
4.	"I'm in a Philly Mood"	Hall; Moreland; Smith; Gorrie	5:15
5.	"Borderline"	Hall; Lena Fiagbe; Michael Peden	6:16
6.	"Stop Loving Me, Stop Loving You"	Hall; S. Allen; Marvin Gaye	4:41
7.	"Help Me Find a Way to Your Heart"	Hall; Moreland; Smith; Gorrie; Mariah Carey; Walter Afanasieff	4:50
8.	"Send Me"	Hall; Moreland; Smith; Gorrie	4:55
9.	"Wildfire"	Hall; Moreland; Smith; S. Allen	4:58
10.	"Money Changes Everything"	Hall; Gorrie	4:51
11.	"Written in Stone"	Janna Allen; Steve Dubin; Kevin Savigar	5:02

Japanese bonus track

No.	Title	Writer(s)	Length
12.	"I've Finally Seen the Light"	Hall; Gorrie	5:06

== Personnel ==
==== Musicians ====
- Daryl Hall – lead and backing vocals, keyboards
- Peter Lord Moreland – keyboards (1–4, 7, 9), backing vocals (1, 3, 4, 7–9, 11)
- V. Jeffrey Smith – programming (1–4, 7, 9), electric guitar (1), synth bass (1–3, 8), keyboards (2), guitars (8), saxophone (9), backing vocals (1, 3, 4, 7–9, 11)
- Alec Shantzis – keyboards (1)
- Mel Wesson – additional programming (1, 9), programming (5, 10, 11)
- Peter Moshay – additional programming (2), programming (7, 8)
- Peter "Ski" Schwartz – keyboards (2)
- Eric Kupper – keyboards (3)
- Tommy Eyre – keyboards (5, 6, 10, 11)
- Terry Burrus – acoustic piano (9)
- Larry Tagg – guitars (10)
- Alan Gorrie – bass (1), backing vocals (1, 6, 9–11)
- Tom "T-Bone" Wolk – bass (4, 9), acoustic guitar (4, 9)
- Bob Bitsand – bass (5, 10, 11)
- Rich Tancredi – bass (7)
- Bernard Davis – drums (4, 9)
- Trevor Murrell – drums (10, 11)
- Miles Bould – percussion (5, 10, 11)
- Frank Ricotti – vibraphone (6)
- Phil Todd – flute (5), saxophone (5), EWI (11)
- Charles DeChant – saxophone (6, 10)
- Arif Mardin – string arrangements and scoring (1, 2)
- Joe Mardin – string arrangements and scoring (1, 2)
- Nick Ingman – string arrangements (5, 6, 11), conductor (11)
- William Jones – scoring (11)
- Gavyn Wright – orchestra leader (1, 2, 5, 6, 9, 11)
- The London Session Orchestra – strings (1, 2, 5, 6, 9, 11)
- Sandra St. Victor – backing vocals (1, 3, 4, 7–9, 11)
- Lorna Bannon – backing vocals (5, 10)
- Tee Green – backing vocals (5, 10)
- Lorraine McIntosh – backing vocals (5)

==== Technical ====
- Produced by Daryl Hall, Peter Lord Moreland, V. Jeffrey Smith (1–4, 7–9), and Michael Peden (5, 6, 10, 11)
- Engineered by Peter Moshay (1–4, 7–9) and Martin Hayles (5, 6, 10, 11)
- Assistant engineers – Paul "Max" Bloom (5, 11) and Yan Meemi (5, 6, 10)
- Strings recorded by Martin Hayles (1, 2, 5, 6, 9, 11)
- Mixed by David Morales and John Poppo (1–4, 7–9, 11); Michael Peden (5, 6, 10)
- Mastered by Vlado Meller at Sony Music Studios (New York City, NY)
- Art direction – Tony Sellari
- Assistant design – Aimée Macauley
- Photography – Dave Stewart
- Management – Horizon Entertainment Management Group, Inc.

== Charts ==
Chart (1993–94)	Peak position
UK Albums (Official Charts)	55
US Billboard 200	177
