= Multiplicity (album) =

Studio album by Dave Weckl
- Released: July 5, 2005
- Recorded: January 2005
- Studios: The Garage (Woodland Hills, California)
- Genres: Fusion, Jazz
- Length: 54:09
- Label: Stretch Records
- Producer: Dave Weckl

Multiplicity is a 2005 studio album by American drummer Dave Weckl.

== Track listing ==
1. "Watch Your Step" (Dave Weckl, Gary Meek, Steve Weingart) - 5:29
2. "Elements of Surprise" (Weckl, Meek, Weingart) - 5:40
3. "Vuelo" (Weingart) - 5:55
4. "Inner Vision" (Weckl, Meek, Weingart) - 6:01
5. "What It Is" (Weckl, Meek, Weingart) - 6:24
6. "Chain Reaction" (Weingart) - 5:34
7. "Cascade" (Weingart) - 5:33
8. "Mixed Bag" (Weckl, Meek, Weingart) - 6:37
9. "Down On The Corner" (Weckl, Meek, Weingart, Ric Fierabracci) - 6:54

== Personnel ==
- Dave Weckl – drums, percussion (1, 4, 6), percussion programming (5), timbales (8)
- Steve Weingart – keyboards
- Paul Pesco – guitars (1, 5–9)
- Tom Kennedy – bass (1, 3, 4, 6, 8)
- Ric Fierabracci – bass (2, 5, 7, 9)
- Richie Gajate Garcia – percussion (2–4, 7), congas (8), cajón (8), shekere (8)
- Gary Meek – tenor saxophone (1–3, 5–8), soprano saxophone (2, 4), bass clarinet (2), alto flute (7)

=== Production ===
- Dave Weckl – producer, recording, mixing, editing
- Ron Boustead – mastering at Precision Mastering (Hollywood, California)
- Abbey Anna – art direction
- Andrew Pham – package design
- Ninoska Weckl – original cover photography
