= Dreamtime (Daryl Hall song) =

Single by Daryl Hall

from the album Three Hearts in the Happy Ending Machine
- B-side: "Let It Out"
- Released: July 21, 1986
- Recorded: 1985
- Genre: New wave; psychedelia; psychedelic rock
- Length: 4:45 (album version); 3:57 (7" version); 7:55 (extended remixed version)
- Label: RCA
- Composers: Daryl Hall; John Beeby
- Lyricist: Daryl Hall
- Producers: Daryl Hall; David A. Stewart; Tom "T-Bone" Wolk

Daryl Hall singles chronology
"Dreamtime" (1986)	"Foolish Pride" (1986)

Music video
- "Dreamtime" on YouTube

"Dreamtime" is a song by American singer-songwriter Daryl Hall. Co-written with John Beeby, the song was issued as the lead single to Hall's second solo album Three Hearts in the Happy Ending Machine (1986) on July 21, 1986.

"Dreamtime" peaked at number 5 on the US Billboard Hot 100 in October 1986 and reached number 3 on the Radio & Records pop airplay chart.

== Formatting ==
The original recording is 4:45 in length. The music video extends the track length to 5:12.

== Critical reception ==
Kent Zimmerman of the Gavin Report responded positively to "Dreamtime", saying it is a "riveting record layered with hooks and soulful roots." His colleague Dave Sholin also responded favorably in that he "leaves his mark of originality on this full blown production that's pop all the way." A staff review from Cash Box was also welcoming of the track, praising its "blustery, infectious production."

In his four-star review of the parent album, AllMusic critic Stephen Thomas Erlewine singled out the song, calling it "tremendous" and "a swirling slice of arty new wave psychedelia that stands in direct contrast to anything Hall & Oates sent into the Top Ten".

== Track listings and formats ==
7-inch single

1. "Dreamtime" – 4:48
2. "Let It Out" – 4:27

12-inch single

1. "Dreamtime" – 5:00
2. "Let It Out" – 4:25
3. "Dreamtime" (7" Version) – 3:57

12-inch dance mix single

1. "Dreamtime" (Dance Mix) – 7:55
2. "Dreamtime" (Instrumental) – 7:49
3. "Let It Out" – 3:50

== Personnel ==
- Daryl Hall – lead and backing vocals, electric guitar, keyboards
- David A. Stewart – guitar solo
- Tom "T-Bone" Wolk – bass guitar, electric guitar
- Tony Beard – drums
- Michel de la Porte – percussion
- Kate St. John and June Montana – additional backing vocals
- Michael Kamen – string arrangements and conductor

== Charts ==
=== Weekly charts ===
Chart (1986–1987)	Peak position
Australia (Kent Music Report)	28
Belgium (Ultratop 50 Flanders)	19
Canada Top Singles (RPM)	16
Germany (GfK)	53
Europe (European Hot 100 Singles)	53
European Airplay (Music & Media)	3
Finland (Suomen virallinen lista)	17
Ireland (IRMA)	15
Israel (IBA)	4
Netherlands (Single Top 100)	30
UK Singles (Official Charts)	28
US Billboard Hot 100	5
US Adult Contemporary (Billboard)	24
US Dance Club Songs (Billboard)	36
US Mainstream Rock (Billboard)	11
US Cash Box Top 100 Singles	5
US Adult Contemporary (Gavin Report)	26
US Top 40 (Gavin Report)	3
US Adult Contemporary (Radio & Records)	23
US AOR Tracks (Radio & Records)	7
US Contemporary Hit Radio (Radio & Records)	3

=== Year-end charts ===
Chart (1986)	Position
US Billboard Hot 100	94
US Cash Box Top 100 Singles	36
US Top 40 (Gavin Report)	53
US AOR Tracks (Radio & Records)	86
US Contemporary Hit Radio (Radio & Records)	53
