= Do It for Love (Hall & Oates album) =

2003 studio album by Hall & Oates

Studio album by Daryl Hall & John Oates
- Released: February 11, 2003
- Studios: A-Pawling Studios (Pawling, New York); Protopia Studios (New York City, New York); Rive Droite Music Ltd. (London, UK); Stella Studios (UK)
- Genre: Pop
- Length: 56:32
- Labels: U-Watch; Sanctuary
- Producers: Daryl Hall; John Oates; David Bellochio; Greg Fitzgerald; Kenny Gioia; Paul Pesco; Brian Rawling; Mark Taylor; Tom "T-Bone" Wolk

Daryl Hall & John Oates chronology
VH1 Behind the Music: The Daryl Hall and John Oates Collection (2002)	Do It for Love (2003)	Ultimate Daryl Hall + John Oates (2004)

Singles from Do It For Love
- 1. "Do It For Love" Released: September 3, 2002; 2. "Getaway Car" Released: 2003

Professional ratings
Review scores
Source	Rating
AllMusic	4/5 stars

Do It for Love is the sixteenth studio album by pop rock duo Daryl Hall & John Oates, released on February 11, 2003, through U-Watch Records and Sanctuary Records. The title track peaked at No. 1 on Adult Contemporary charts making it the eighth No. 1 hit of their career, with "Forever For You", "Man on a Mission", and "Getaway Car" all charted as well. It was their first album of all-new material in six years and their last full album of original material.

"Getaway Car" was also recorded by country acts Susan Ashton, 4 Runner, and The Jenkins, as well as R&B group Dakota Moon. The Jenkins' version was a No. 38 Hot Country Songs hit in 2004.

== Track listing ==
No.	Title	Writer(s)	Producer(s)	Length
1.	"Man on a Mission"	Daryl Hall; John Oates; Paul Barry; Steve Torch	Hall; Oates; Mark Taylor; Brian Rawling; Tom "T-Bone" Wolk	3:44
2.	"Do It for Love"	Hall; Oates; Billy Mann; Paul Pesco	Kenny Gioia	3:58
3.	"Someday We'll Know" (featuring Todd Rundgren)	Gregg Alexander; Danielle Brisebois; Debra Holland	Hall; Wolk	4:28
4.	"Forever for You"	Oates; Barry; Torch; Taylor	Hall; Wolk; Taylor; Rawling	4:37
5.	"Life's Too Short"	Hall; Oates; Mann	Hall; Wolk	3:30
6.	"Getaway Car"	Gary Haase; Billy Mann	Hall; Wolk	3:49
7.	"Make You Stay"	Hall; Oates; Mann; Pesco	Hall; Wolk; Taylor; Rawling	3:41
8.	"Miss DJ"	Hall; Mann; Greg Fitzgerald; Tom Nichols	Hall; Wolk; Fitzgerald	3:49
9.	"(She) Got Me Bad"	Fitzgerald; Nichols	Hall; Wolk; Fitzgerald	3:16
10.	"Breath of Your Life"	Hall; Fitzgerald; Nichols	Hall; Wolk; Fitzgerald	3:55
11.	"Intuition"	Barry; Mann; Taylor	Hall; Wolk; Taylor; Rawling	4:10
12.	"Heartbreak Time"	Hall; Barry; Taylor; Torch	Hall; Wolk; Taylor; Rawling	4:06
13.	"Something About You"	Hall; Sara Allen; David Bellochio	Hall; Wolk; Bellochio	4:02
14.	"Love in a Dangerous Time"	Oates; Arthur Baker; Tom Farragher	Hall; Wolk	4:56
Total length:				56:32

Borders bonus track
No.	Title	Writer(s)	Length
15.	"It Must Be"	Hall; Pesco; Eliot Kennedy	3:28
Total length:			59:33

Sony Music release bonus track
No.	Title	Writer(s)	Length
15.	"Everytime You Go Away" (live)	Hall

Japanese release bonus track
No.	Title	Writer(s)	Length
15.	"Private Eyes" (live)	Hall; S. Allen; Janna Allen; Warren Pash	3:41
Total length:			59:48

== Personnel ==
- Daryl Hall – lead vocals (1–13, 16), backing vocals (1–10, 12–14, 16), keyboards (1, 3–5, 9, 11, 12, 14), electric guitar (8), string arrangements (12)
- John Oates – backing vocals (1–4, 7–10, 12, 14), lead vocals (3, 14), electric guitar (14)
- David Sancious – keyboards (1, 3–6, 12, 14)
- Greg Bieck – programming and sequencing (1, 4, 5, 11, 14), bass (4)
- Kenny Gioia – programming and sequencing (1, 2, 4, 6–11, 13, 16), keyboards (2), strings (2, 7), drums (2, 3, 6–9, 16), percussion (3, 6–9, 13, 16)
- Shep Goodman – programming and sequencing (1, 2, 4, 6–11, 13, 16), keyboards (2), strings (2, 7), acoustic guitar (2, 9), electric guitar (9), bass (9)
- Peter Moshay – programming and sequencing (6)
- Mark Taylor – programming and sequencing (7), string arrangements (12)
- Greg Fitzgerald – programming and sequencing (8–10), acoustic guitar (8, 10), backing vocals (8–10), keyboards (9), electric guitar (9)
- Jeff Catania – electric guitar (1, 2, 5, 6, 8), acoustic guitar (3, 7), electric guitar solo (7)
- Tom "T-Bone" Wolk – acoustic guitar (1, 3–7, 9, 14, 16), bass (1, 3–8, 10–14, 16), electric guitar (5, 12, 13, 16), organ (13), keyboards (16)
- Todd Rundgren – electric guitar (3), lead vocals (3), backing vocals (3)
- Billy Mann – acoustic guitar (5, 6, 11)
- Paul Pesco – acoustic guitar (4), electric guitar (12, 16)
- Mike Shimshack – electric guitar (7)
- Jack Daly – bass (13)
- Mickey Curry – drums (1, 4, 5, 11, 12)
- Steven Wolf – drums (13)
- Steve Torch – string arrangements (12)
- Audrey Martells – backing vocals (14)

== Production ==
- Daryl Hall – producer (1, 3–14, 16)
- John Oates – producer (1)
- Brian Rawling – producer (1, 4, 7, 11, 12)
- Mark Taylor – producer (1, 4, 7, 11, 12)
- Tom "T-Bone" Wolk – producer (1, 3–14)
- Kenny Gioia – producer (2, 7, 9)
- Shep Goodman – producer (2, 7, 9)
- Greg Fitzgerald – producer (8–10)
- David Bellochio – producer (13)
- Art Burrows – concept, design, digital imaging, photography
- Dorothy Low – photography
- Randee St. Nicholas – photography
- Doyle/Kos Entertainment, Inc. – management

Technical credits

- Bob Ludwig – mastering at Gateway Mastering (Portland, Maine)
- Peter Moshay – engineer (1, 3–14, 16), mixing (5, 16)
- Kenny Gioia – mixing (1–4, 6–14), engineer (2)
- Sheppard Goodman – mixing (1–4, 6–14), engineer (2)
- Koz Koda – assistant engineer
- Chris Davis – guitar technician
- Chris Martirano – keyboard technician

== Charts ==
Chart (2003)	Peak position
US Billboard 200	77
US Independent Albums (Billboard)	2
