= The Jenkins =

American country music group

- Origin: Sebastopol, California, United States
- Genres: Country
- Years active: 2004-2008
- Labels: Capitol Nashville
- Members: Brodie Jenkins; Kacie Jenkins; Nancy Jenkins

The Jenkins were an American country music group comprising Nancy Jenkins and her daughters, Kacie and Brodie. The trio had two singles in the U.S. Billboard Hot Country Songs charts: "Blame It on Mama" at No. 34 and "Getaway Car" at No. 38. The latter was later a single for Hall & Oates. An album was recorded for Capitol Nashville but never released.

== Biography ==
Nancy Jenkins and her daughters began to perform together when she started to produce the annual talent show at Kacie and Brodie's school. When Kacie was in sixth grade, the three performed The Judds' song "Guardian Angels" in a school production. Dennis Hysom, a local songwriter, who attended the show persuaded Nancy and her daughters to pursue a career as a country music trio. The three then recorded a demo tape, with Nancy writing some of the songs.

In 2003, the trio was signed to Capitol Records, working with singer-songwriter and record producer Rodney Crowell on the first album, to be called The Jenkins. "Blame It on Mama" was released as an advance single in early 2004; the song was a minor top 40 hit in the Billboard U.S. Hot Country Songs chart. A second single, "Getaway Car", was released but the album itself was never released. "Getaway Car" was originally recorded by 4 Runner on their album Getaway Car, and was later a hit in the Hot Adult Contemporary Tracks charts when Hall & Oates recorded it.

The Jenkins left Capitol in 2008.

== Discography ==
=== Singles ===
Year	Single	Peak positions	Album
Year	Single	US Country	Album
2004	"Blame It on Mama"	34	The Jenkins (unreleased)
2004	"Getaway Car"	38	The Jenkins (unreleased)

=== Music videos ===
Year	Video	Director
2004	"Blame It on Mama"	Steven Goldmann
2004	"Getaway Car"	Trey Fanjoy
