= Daryl Hall =

American singer (born 1946)

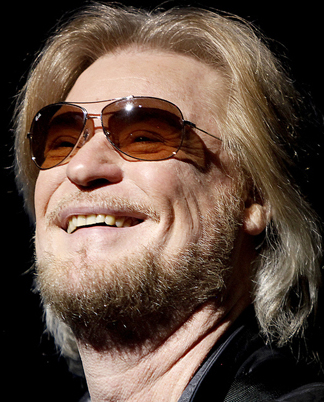
- Hall in 2011

Background information
- Also known as: Daryl Hohl; Daryl F. Hall; D. Franklin Hall
- Born: Daryl Franklin Hohl; October 11, 1946 (age 80); Pottstown, Pennsylvania, U.S.
- Origin: Philadelphia, Pennsylvania, U.S.
- Genres: Rock; soul; R&B
- Occupations: Singer; musician; songwriter
- Instruments: Vocals; guitar; keyboards; mandolin; vibraphone
- Years active: 1965–present
- Labels: Elektra; Atlantic; RCA; Epic; Arista; U-Watch; Verve
- Formerly of: Gulliver; Daryl Hall & John Oates
- Website: darylhall.com

Daryl Franklin Hohl (born October 11, 1946), known professionally as Daryl Hall, is an American rock and soul singer-songwriter. He is best known as the co-founder and principal lead vocalist of Hall & Oates, with guitarist and songwriter John Oates. Outside of his work in Hall & Oates, Hall has also released six solo albums, including the 1980 collaboration with progressive rock guitarist Robert Fripp, Sacred Songs. His 1986 album Three Hearts in the Happy Ending Machine provided his best-selling single, "Dreamtime", which peaked at number five on the Billboard Hot 100. Hall has also collaborated on numerous works by other artists, such as Fripp's 1979 release Exposure, and Dusty Springfield's 1995 album A Very Fine Love, which produced a UK Top 40 hit with "Wherever Would I Be". Since late 2007, Hall has hosted the streaming television series Live from Daryl's House, in which he performs alongside other artists, doing a mix of songs from each's catalog. The show has also been rebroadcast on a number of cable and satellite channels.

In the 1970s and early 1980s, Hall scored numerous Billboard chart hits and is regarded as one of the best soul singers of his generation. Fripp, who worked with Hall several times, has written, "Daryl's pipes were a wonder. I have never worked with a more able singer." Hall was inducted into the Songwriters Hall of Fame in 2004 and the Rock and Roll Hall of Fame in April 2014. On November 1, 2023, his TV series (Live from Daryl's House) returned on Hall's YouTube channel with an episode featuring Squeeze singer/songwriter Glenn Tilbrook. The new batch of episodes also featured Blackberry Smoke singer/guitarist Charlie Starr, King Crimson guitarist and Daryl Hall solo album producer Robert Fripp, Lisa Loeb, and Howard Jones.

== Early life and career ==
Hall was born on October 11, 1946, in Pottstown, a Pennsylvania borough 40 miles (64 km) from Philadelphia; his family is of German descent. Both of Hall's parents had a background in music: his father came from a choral-group clan and his mother was a vocal coach. Hall began recording music with a student at Owen J. Roberts High School, from which he graduated in 1964.

Hall is Jewish. At college at Temple University in Philadelphia, he majored in music, while continuing to record. Hall worked with Kenny Gamble and Leon Huff as both an artist and a session musician. While a student, Hall met and eventually married Byrna Lublin, whom he converted to Judaism for. During his first semester at Temple, in the fall of 1965, Hall and four other Temple University students formed the vocal harmony group the Temptones. They were popular additions to the largely black Philly soul scene, defeating both The Ambassadors and The Delfonics in a contest at the Uptown Theater. The Temptones recorded a handful of singles for Arctic Records, produced by Jimmy Bishop. While performing at the Uptown Theater, Hall formed creative affiliations with artists including Smokey Robinson, the Temptations, and many other top soul singers of the 1960s.

In 1967, Hall met John Oates, who was also an undergraduate at Temple University. According to Hall, they met when "We got in the middle of a fight at a dance–I have no idea what the fight was about. I guess the Greek letters on one gang's jackets didn't appeal to the other gang. We both beat it out the back and met on the elevator while leaving the place rather quickly." Hall was by then a senior while Oates was a freshman. They played together until Oates transferred to a different school at age 19. Hall did not let Oates' departure discourage him from pursuing his own musical career as he dropped out of college in 1968 and worked with Tim Moore in a short-lived rock band, Gulliver, and released an album on the Elektra Records label. Hall was a member of the studio group behind the project Electric Indian whose song "Keem-O-Sabe" became a big hit in 1969. That same year, Hall again began recording songs by other artists, which led to the duo Hall & Oates signing their first record contract in early 1972.

== Daryl Hall and John Oates ==
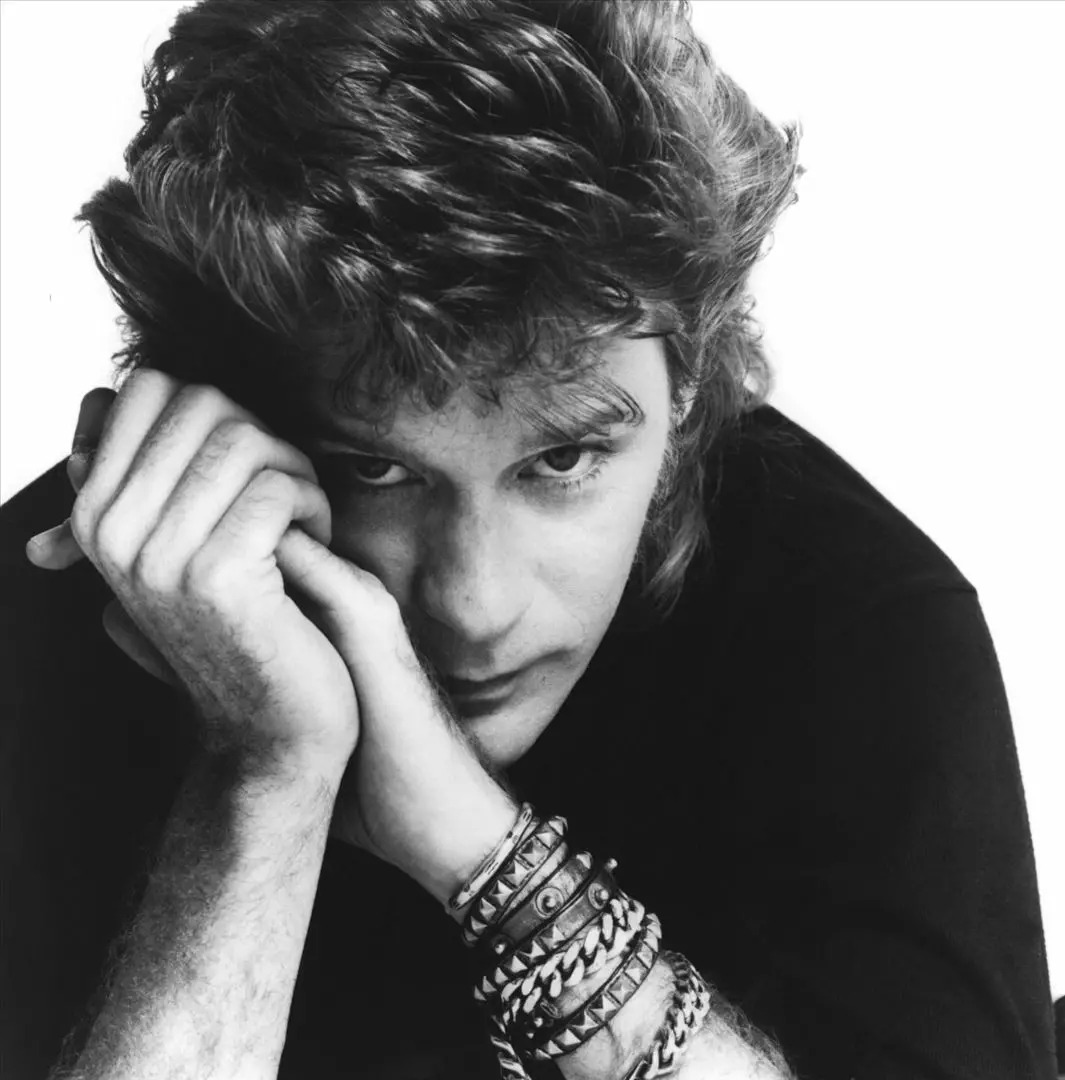
1984 publicity photo

Signed to Atlantic by Ahmet Ertegun and managed by Tommy Mottola in the early 1970s, Daryl Hall and John Oates have sold more albums than any other duo in music history. Their second album, Abandoned Luncheonette, produced by Arif Mardin and released in 1973, yielded the single "She's Gone", which went to No. 7 in the U.S. Top 10 on re-release in 1976 after reaching No. 1 on the R&B charts when it was covered by Tavares. The duo recorded one more album for Atlantic, War Babies (produced by Todd Rundgren), before they were dropped and promptly signed by RCA Records. During their tenure at RCA, the duo catapulted to international superstardom.

From the mid-1970s to the mid-1980s, Daryl Hall and John Oates scored six U.S. No. 1 singles, including "Rich Girl" (also No. 1 R&B), "Kiss on My List", "Private Eyes", "I Can't Go for That (No Can Do)" (also No. 1 R&B), "Maneater" and "Out of Touch" from their six multi-platinum albums – Bigger Than Both of Us, Voices, Private Eyes, H2O, Rock 'n Soul Part 1 and Big Bam Boom – the last five of which were released consecutively. The era also produced an additional six U.S. Top 10 singles, "Sara Smile", "One on One", "Family Man", "You Make My Dreams", "Say It Isn't So" and "Method of Modern Love".

In 1972, Daryl Hall and John Oates opened for David Bowie, who was performing in his first tour of the United States as his stage persona Ziggy Stardust. The duo was inducted into the Rock and Roll Hall of Fame in 2014.

In November 2023, Hall sued John Oates and obtained a temporary restraining order against him, for initially undisclosed reasons. The following week, Hall filed a declaration accusing Oates of "the ultimate partnership betrayal" for planning to sell his share of the duo's publishing to Primary Wave Music. Oates responded that Hall's statements were "inflammatory, outlandish, and inaccurate". Hall and Oates resolved their legal dispute in August 2025, after participating in arbitration.

== Solo projects ==
In addition to his work with Oates, Hall recorded music as a solo artist as well as recording with Robert Fripp in the late 1970s, working on Fripp's critically praised Exposure album from 1979. In 1977, Fripp produced and performed on Hall's debut solo album, the much-acclaimed Sacred Songs. This album was released three years later.

In 1984, Hall co-wrote and produced, with Arthur Baker, the single "Swept Away" for Diana Ross, which reached US No. 19, US R & B No. 3 and US Dance/Club Play No. 1. In 1985 he performed two songs during the first Farm Aid concert in Champaign, Illinois. Hall participated in the We Are the World session as well as closing the Live Aid show in Philadelphia. He also made an album with Dave Stewart that year, Three Hearts in the Happy Ending Machine, which yielded his number five solo single "Dreamtime". He has recorded solo works like Soul Alone in 1993 and Can't Stop Dreaming in 1996, both of which were received well internationally. In 1994 he composed "Gloryland", the official album of the 1994 FIFA World Cup.

In 2007 Hall guest-starred on the HBO series Flight of the Conchords, playing an MC of a "world music" festival. On March 12, 2008, he played a well-received set with his band at the South by Southwest festival in Austin, Texas.

Hall was slated to sing the National Anthem of the United States before Game 5 of the 2008 World Series at Philadelphia's Citizens Bank Park, but could not appear due to an illness, and Oates sang it instead. In 2009, Hall guest starred as himself on the Independent Film Channel series, Z-Rock.

In 2010, Hall was back in the studio working on a solo recording with bassist and musical director T-Bone Wolk. Wolk died of a heart attack on February 28, hours after completing a session with Hall. Hall released a statement about the death of his bassist of nearly 30 years: "It's not if I will go on, but how? T-Bone was one of the most sensitive and good human beings that I have ever known." On June 11, Hall shared the stage with electronic duo Chromeo for a special late night set at the Bonnaroo Music and Arts Festival. Their set consisted of a mix of both Hall & Oates and Chromeo tracks.

On August 12, 2011, UK Electronic duo Nero released their debut album Welcome Reality, which features guest vocals by Hall on the track "Reaching Out", which also samples Hall & Oates' 1980s hit "Out of Touch". On September 27, Hall released the album Laughing Down Crying on Verve Records. "Reaching Out" was released as the sixth single on December 6.

On June 21, 2024, Hall toured with Elvis Costello, and released "D," his first solo album in 13 years, co-produced by fellow RHOF inductee Dave Stewart, who co-wrote seven of the nine new original songs, with Hall penning the other two, on Virgin Records. The album spawned two singles on the AC chart with "Can't Say No To You" reaching number 13 and "Whole World's Better" reaching number 20.

== Home restoration ==
Hall restores and preserves historic homes in both the United States and England. In 2008, he purchased the 18th-century Bray House, in Kittery Point, Maine, and is in the process of restoring it. Hall also restored a Georgian-style home in London, first built in 1740, with direct waterfront access to the River Thames. He purchased two homes near Hartford, Connecticut–one built in 1771, the other in 1780–and had them moved to the same property in New York's Dutchess County where they were combined and restored. After having the houses moved, Hall discovered that both homes were coincidentally connected to the same family. He has a home in Charleston, South Carolina.

Hall hosted the 2014 television show Daryl's Restoration Over-Hall on the DIY Network, which showed him and a crew working on restoring one of his homes in Connecticut.

== Live from Daryl's House ==
Since 2007, Hall has hosted the online show/webcast Live from Daryl's House, which features live music acts in a podcast/videocast first from his home in Millerton, New York, and more recently from his club Daryl's House in Pawling, New York. The webcast has featured appearances by Ben Folds, Johnny Rzeznik, CeeLo Green, The O'Jays, Smokey Robinson, KT Tunstall, Joe Walsh, Rob Thomas, Todd Rundgren, Darius Rucker, Eric Hutchinson, Cheap Trick, Aaron Neville, Chuck Prophet, Travie McCoy, Ray Manzarek, Tommy Shaw, Robbie Krieger of The Doors, and many others as well as a holiday special featuring Shelby Lynne and songs from the Hall and Oates release Home for Christmas.

In a June 2008 interview with Blues & Soul magazine, Hall said of the webcast, "For me it was sort of an obvious thing. I've been touring my whole adult life really, and, you know, you can't be EVERYWHERE! Nor do I WANT to be everywhere at this point! I only like to spend so much time per year on the road. So I thought 'Why don't I just do something where anyone who wants to see me anywhere in the world CAN?! And, instead of doing the artist/audience performance-type thing, I wanted to deconstruct it and make the audience more of a fly-on-the-wall kind of observer... I mean, what I've always done onstage is very natural. I talk to the audience and it's a very sitting-roomy kind of thing. So I just thought I'd basically bring that to the web."

Hall hosted WGN America's 2010 New Year's Eve coverage as a Live from Daryl's House special. The special featured clips of previous episodes. Steve Dahl, a Chicago radio host, praised the special as the best New Year's Eve special on television for 2010–11, though he criticized the show's lack of a live countdown to midnight.

In July 2018, BMG partnered with Hall and Jonathan Wolfson to secure worldwide rights for Live from Daryl's House and will begin producing new segments beginning that fall, the company announced. The agreement includes worldwide rights to the complete run of 82 episodes filmed from 2007 to 2016, and the company is seeking distribution partners for the new episodes.

On November 1, 2023, Hall's TV series (Live from Daryl's House) returned on Hall's YouTube channel with a new episode featuring Squeeze singer/songwriter Glenn Tilbrook. The new batch of episodes also featured Blackberry Smoke singer/guitarist Charlie Starr, King Crimson guitarist and Daryl Hall solo album producer Robert Fripp, Lisa Loeb and Howard Jones.

== Personal life ==
Hall was married to Bryna Lublin from 1969 to 1972. He converted to Lublin's religion, Judaism, in order to marry her. Hall has not actively participated in religion since that time, but he said that he feels more of a connection to Judaism than to his original affiliation, Methodism. While Hall admits to having had a passing interest in the ideas of English occultist, ceremonial magician, artist, and writer Aleister Crowley, he does not consider Thelema (Crowley's religion) to be his faith.

Hall had a nearly 30-year relationship with songwriter Sara Allen. She was the inspiration for the song "Sara Smile" and a frequent collaborator with Hall & Oates. They broke up in 2001 for undisclosed reasons and were never married, but they still remain friends (Allen briefly appears in a May 2016 episode of Live from Daryl's House). According to interviews with Hall and Allen in the VH1 Behind the Music documentary about Hall & Oates, their breakup was partially due to the death of Janna Allen at age 36 from leukemia. Janna Allen was a close musical collaborator and Sara Allen's sister.

Hall has one biological child with Andrea Zabloski. According to Hall, he and his son are not close.

Hall was married to Amanda Aspinall, daughter of English gambling mogul John Aspinall, from 2009 to 2015. She had two children from a previous relationship; her daughter March sang backing vocals on songs "Save Me", "Message to Ya", and "Eyes for You" on Hall's 2011 album, Laughing Down Crying. Aspinall died in January 2019.

Hall contracted Lyme disease in 2005.

== Hit singles ==
Hall and Oates had six number one hits on the Billboard Hot 100 chart from 1977 to 1984; they were written or co-written by Hall: "Rich Girl", "Kiss on My List" (which Hall wrote with Janna Allen), "Private Eyes" (with Sara Allen, Janna Allen & Warren Pash), "I Can't Go for That (No Can Do)" (with John Oates & Sara Allen), "Maneater" (with John Oates & Sara Allen), and "Out of Touch" (with John Oates).

"Do It For Love" (written with John Oates) and "It Came Upon a Midnight Clear" (by Edmund Hamilton Sears & Richard Storrs Willis) topped the U.S. Adult Contemporary charts. "Everytime You Go Away", written by Hall and featured on the Hall & Oates album Voices, reached number one in the US and Canada in 1985 when covered by Paul Young.

The Hall and Oates song "She's Gone", which Hall and Oates co-wrote, reached number one on the Billboard Hot Soul Singles chart when covered by Tavares in 1974. Hall sang lead vocals on, and wrote or co-wrote, nine more popular Billboard songs that also made the Top 10: "Say It Isn't So", "Adult Education" (with John Oates & Sara Allen), "Sara Smile" (with John Oates – a song that refers to Hall's then-girlfriend), "Method of Modern Love" (with Janna Allen), "You Make My Dreams" (with John Oates & Sara Allen), "Everything Your Heart Desires", "One on One", "Did It in a Minute" (with Sara Allen & Janna Allen), and "So Close" (with George Green).

Hall has also had hits that were cover versions, including reaching No. 12 with his 1980 rendition of the Righteous Brothers' "You've Lost That Loving Feeling".

== Discography ==
=== Hall & Oates ===
==== Studio albums ====
Title	Year
Whole Oats	1972
Abandoned Luncheonette	1973
War Babies	1974
Daryl Hall & John Oates	1975
Bigger Than Both of Us	1976
Beauty on a Back Street	1977
Along the Red Ledge	1978
X-Static	1979
Voices	1980
Private Eyes	1981
H_{2}O	1982
Big Bam Boom	1984
Ooh Yeah!	1988
Change of Season	1990
Marigold Sky	1997
Do It for Love	2003
Our Kind of Soul	2004
Home for Christmas	2006

==== Live albums ====
Title	Year
Livetime	1978
Sweet Soul Music	1984
Live at the Apollo (with David Ruffin and Eddie Kendrick)	1985
Sara Smile	1995
Live!	1998
Limited Edition	2001
Ecstasy on the Edge	2001
Greatest Hits Live	2001
Live in Concert	2003
Live at the Troubadour	2008
Live in Dublin	2015

==== Singles ====
Title	Album	Year
"Goodnight and Good Morning" (as Whole Oats)	Whole Oats	1972
"I'm Sorry"	Whole Oats	1973
"She's Gone"	Abandoned Luncheonette	1973
"When the Morning Comes"	Abandoned Luncheonette	1974
"Can't Stop the Music (He Played It Much Too Long)"	War Babies	1974
"Camellia"	Daryl Hall & John Oates	1975
"Alone Too Long"	Daryl Hall & John Oates	1975
"Sara Smile"	Daryl Hall & John Oates	1976
"She's Gone" (re-release)	Abandoned Luncheonette	1976
"Do What You Want, Be What You Are"	Bigger Than Both of Us	1976
"Rich Girl"	Bigger Than Both of Us	1977
"Back Together Again"	Bigger Than Both of Us	1977
"It's Uncanny"	No Goodbyes	1977
"Why Do Lovers (Break Each Other's Heart?)"	Beauty on a Back Street	1977
"Don't Change"	Beauty on a Back Street	1977
"It's a Laugh"	Along the Red Ledge	1978
"I Don't Wanna Lose You"	Along the Red Ledge	1978
"Wait for Me"	X-Static	1979
"Portable Radio"	X-Static	1979
"Who Said the World Was Fair"	X-Static	1980
"Running from Paradise"	X-Static	1980
"How Does It Feel to Be Back"	Voices	1980
"You've Lost That Lovin' Feelin'"	Voices	1980
"Kiss on My List"	Voices	1981
"You Make My Dreams"	Voices	1981
"Private Eyes"	Private Eyes	1981
"I Can't Go for That (No Can Do)"	Private Eyes	1981
"Did It in a Minute"	Private Eyes	1982
"Your Imagination"	Private Eyes	1982
"Maneater"	H_{2}O	1982
"One on One"	H_{2}O	1983
"Family Man"	H_{2}O	1983
"Italian Girls"	H_{2}O	1983
"Jingle Bell Rock"	non-album single	1983
"Say It Isn't So"	Rock 'n' Soul: Part 1	1983
"Adult Education"	Rock 'n' Soul: Part 1	1984
"Out of Touch"	Big Bam Boom	1984
"Method of Modern Love"	Big Bam Boom	1985
"Some Things Are Better Left Unsaid"	Big Bam Boom	1985
"Possession Obsession"	Big Bam Boom	1985
"A Nite at the Apollo Live! The Way You Do the Things You Do/My Girl" (with David Ruffin and Eddie Kendricks)	Live at the Apollo	1985
"Everything Your Heart Desires"	Ooh Yeah!	1988
"Missed Opportunity"	Ooh Yeah!	1988
"Downtown Life"	Ooh Yeah!	1988
"Talking All Night"	Ooh Yeah!	1988
"Love Train"	Earth Girls Are Easy (soundtrack)	1989
"So Close"	Change of Season	1990
"Don't Hold Back Your Love"	Change of Season	1991
"Everywhere I Look"	Change of Season	1991
"Starting All Over Again"	Change of Season	1991
"Promise Ain't Enough"	Marigold Sky	1997
"Romeo Is Bleeding"	Marigold Sky	1998
"The Sky Is Falling"	Marigold Sky	1998
"Hold On to Yourself"	Marigold Sky	1998
"Throw the Roses Away"	Marigold Sky	1998
"I Can't Go for That (No Can Do)" (remix)	The Essential Collection	2001
"Private Eyes" (re-release)	The Essential Collection	2002
"Do It for Love"	Do It for Love	2002
"Forever for You"	Do It for Love	2002
"Man on a Mission"	Do It for Love	2003
"Someday We'll Know" (with Todd Rundgren)	Do It for Love	2003
"Intuition"	Do It for Love	2003
"Getaway Car"	Do It for Love	2003
"I'll Be Around"	Our Kind of Soul	2004
"Without You"	Our Kind of Soul	2004
"I Can Dream About You"	Our Kind of Soul	2005
"Ooh Child"	Our Kind of Soul	2005
"Let Love Take Control"	Our Kind of Soul	2005
"It Came Upon a Midnight Clear"	Home for Christmas	2006
"Home for Christmas"	Home for Christmas	2006
"Take Christmas Back"	non-album singles	2007
"Philly Forget Me Not" (with Train)	non-album singles	2018
"—" denotes a recording that did not chart or was not released in that territory.

=== Solo ===
==== Albums ====
Year	Album details	Peak chart positions						
Year	Album details	US	AUS	CAN	GER	NL	SWE	UK
1980	Sacred Songs: Released: March 1980; Recorded 1977; Label: RCA	58	—	93	—	—	—	—
1986	Three Hearts in the Happy Ending Machine: Released: 1986; Label: RCA	29	42	30	43	42	12	26
1993	Soul Alone: Released: September 7, 1993; Label: Epic	177	—	—	—	—	—	55
2003	Can't Stop Dreaming: Released: November 21, 1996 (Japan)/ June 10, 2003 (US) / August 18, 2003 (Europe); Label: BMG / Liquid 8 / CNR	—	—	—	—	—	—	—
2011	Laughing Down Crying: Released: September 27, 2011; Label: Verve Forecast	142	—	—	—	—	—	—
2024	D: Released: June 21, 2024; Label: Virgin Music Group	—	—	—	—	—	—	—
"—" denotes the album failed to chart or not released to that country

==== Singles ====
Year	Single	Peak chart positions										Album
Year	Single	US	US AC	US Dance	US R&B	AUS	GER	NL	NZ	SWI	UK	Album
1980	"Sacred Songs" b/w "Something in 4/4 Time"	—	—	—	—	—	—	—	—	—	—	Sacred Songs
1986	"Dreamtime"	5	24	36	—	28	53	30	—	—	28	Three Hearts in the Happy Ending Machine
1986	"Foolish Pride"	33	21	—	91	—	—	—	—	—	—	Three Hearts in the Happy Ending Machine
1986	"I Wasn't Born Yesterday"	—	—	—	—	—	—	—	—	—	93	Three Hearts in the Happy Ending Machine
1986	"Someone like You"	57	11	—	—	—	—	—	—	—	—	Three Hearts in the Happy Ending Machine
1993	"I'm in a Philly Mood"	82	36	—	—	—	71	—	39	—	52	Soul Alone
1993	"Stop Loving Me, Stop Loving You"	—	—	—	—	—	51	—	—	—	30	Soul Alone
1994	"Send Me"	—	—	—	—	—	—	—	—	—	—	Soul Alone
1994	"Love Revelation"	—	—	—	—	—	—	—	—	—	—	Soul Alone
1994	"Help Me Find a Way to Your Heart"	—	—	—	—	—	—	—	—	—	70	Soul Alone
1994	"Wildfire"	—	—	—	—	—	—	—	—	—	99	Soul Alone
1994	"Gloryland" (with Sounds of Blackness)	—	—	—	—	—	—	—	—	37	36	Gloryland (World Cup USA 94)
1995	"Wherever Would I Be" (with Dusty Springfield)	—	—	—	—	—	73	—	—	—	44	A Very Fine Love
1996	"Ghetto Smile" (B-Legit feat Daryl Hall)	—	—	—	—	—	—	—	—	—	159	The Hemp Museum & Dangerous Ground OST
1996	"Justify"	—	—	—	—	—	—	—	—	—	—	Can't Stop Dreaming
1997	"Can't Stop Dreaming"	—	—	—	—	—	—	—	—	—	—	Can't Stop Dreaming
1997	"What's in Your World"	—	—	—	—	—	—	—	—	—	—	Can't Stop Dreaming
2003	"Cab Driver"	—	21	—	—	—	—	—	—	—	—	Can't Stop Dreaming
2004	"She's Gone"	—	—	—	—	—	—	—	—	—	—	Can't Stop Dreaming
2004	"What's in Your World" [US release]	—	27	—	—	—	—	—	—	—	—	Can't Stop Dreaming
2011	"Talking to You (Is like Talking to Myself)"	—	16	—	—	—	—	—	—	—	—	Laughing Down Crying
2011	"Eyes for You"	—	23	—	—	—	—	—	—	—	—	Laughing Down Crying
2011	"Lifetime of Love"	—	—	—	—	—	—	—	—	—	—	Laughing Down Crying
2024	"Can't Say No to You"	—	13	—	—	—	—	—	—	—	—	D
2024	"Walking in Between Raindrops"	—	—	—	—	—	—	—	—	—	—	D
2024	"The Whole World's Better"	—	20	—	—	—	—	—	—	—	—	D
"—" denotes releases that did not chart

==== Guest singles ====
Year	Single	Artist	Peak chart positions		Album
Year	Single	Artist	US	US Country	Album
1984	"The Only Flame in Town"	Elvis Costello	56	—	Goodbye Cruel World
2009	"Sara Smile"	Jimmy Wayne	—	31	Sara Smile

==== Other appearances ====
Year	Song	Album
1989	"Love Train"	Earth Girls Are Easy (Soundtrack)
1991	"Philadelphia Freedom"	Two Rooms: Celebrating the Songs of Elton John & Bernie Taupin
1999	"And That's What Hurts"	Runaway Bride (Music from the Motion Picture)
