= Do It for Love (Hall & Oates song) =

2002 single by Hall & Oates

Single by Hall & Oates

from the album VH1 Behind the Music: The Daryl Hall and John Oates Collection and Do It for Love
- Released: May 20, 2002
- Genre: Pop
- Length: 3:58
- Label: U-Watch
- Songwriters: Daryl Hall; John Oates; Billy Mann; Paul Pesco
- Producers: Hall & Oates

Hall & Oates singles chronology
"Throw the Roses Away" (1998)	"Do It for Love" (2002)	"Forever for You" (2002)

"Do It for Love" is song by American pop rock duo Hall & Oates, serving as the title track to their 16th studio album, Do It for Love (2003). Having first appeared on the 2002 VH1 Behind the Music: The Daryl Hall and John Oates Collection compilation, the song was written by Daryl Hall and John Oates along with Billy Mann and Paul Pesco. It was the duo's first number-one hit on the US Billboard Adult Contemporary chart, spending two weeks at the top in September 2002. It also reached number 14 on the Billboard Bubbling Under Hot 100 Singles chart.

== Charts ==
=== Weekly charts ===
Chart (2002)	Peak position
US Bubbling Under Hot 100 (Billboard)	14
US Adult Contemporary (Billboard)	1

=== Year-end charts ===
Chart (2002)	Position
US Adult Contemporary (Billboard)	12

== See also ==
- List of Billboard Adult Contemporary number ones of 2002
