= Foolish Pride (Daryl Hall song) =

Single by Daryl Hall

from the album Three Hearts in the Happy Ending Machine
- B-side: "What's Gonna Happen to Us"
- Released: October 1986
- Genre: Pop rock
- Label: RCA
- Songwriter: Daryl Hall
- Producers: Daryl Hall; David A. Stewart; Tom "T-Bone" Wolk

Daryl Hall singles chronology
"Dreamtime" (1986)	"Foolish Pride" (1986)	"I Wasn't Born Yesterday" (1987)

Music video
- "Foolish Pride" on YouTube

"Foolish Pride" is a song by American singer-songwriter Daryl Hall, released in October 1986 by RCA Records as the second single from his second solo album, Three Hearts in the Happy Ending Machine (1986). The song reached number 33 on the US Billboard Hot 100 and number 29 on the US Cash Box Top 100. On the Billboard Adult Contemporary chart, "Foolish Pride" reached number 21.

== Charts ==
Chart (1986–1987)	Peak position
Canada Top Singles (RPM)	65
US Billboard Hot 100	33
US Adult Contemporary (Billboard)	21
US Black Singles (Billboard)	91
US Cash Box Top 100	29
US Radio & Records CHR/Pop Airplay Chart	29
