= Getaway Car (Susan Ashton song) =

Single by Hall & Oates

from the album Do It for Love
- Released: 2003
- Genre: Pop
- Length: 3:49
- Label: U-Watch
- Songwriters: Gary Haase, Billy Mann
- Producers: Daryl Hall, Brian Rawling, Sheppard, Mark Taylor

Hall & Oates singles chronology
"Intuition" (2003)	"Getaway Car" (2003)	"I'll Be Around" (2004)

"Getaway Car"

Single by The Jenkins

from the album The Jenkins (unreleased)
- Released: mid-2004
- Genre: Country
- Length: 3:06
- Label: Capitol Nashville
- Songwriters: Gary Haase, Billy Mann
- Producer: Rodney Crowell

The Jenkins singles chronology
"Blame It on Mama" (2004)	"Getaway Car" (2004)

"Getaway Car" is a song written by songwriters Gary Haase and Billy Mann. The song was first recorded in 1999 by Susan Ashton, an American country and Christian singer, on her album Closer, although it was not released as a single.

Since then, the song has been recorded by the country groups 4 Runner and The Jenkins, R&B group Dakota Moon, as well as the rock duo Hall & Oates. 4 Runner, The Jenkins and Hall & Oates all released their renditions as singles. 4 Runner's version, however, did not chart. Hall & Oates's version was released in late 2003 as the fifth and final single from their 2002 album Do It for Love, reaching number 21 on the Billboard Hot Adult Contemporary Tracks charts with it.

In 2004, The Jenkins released their version as the second and final single from their unreleased, self-titled debut album. This rendition reached a peak of number 38 on the Billboard Hot Country Singles & Tracks (now Hot Country Songs) charts in August 2004, becoming the Jenkins' final chart single.

== Chart performance ==
=== Hall & Oates ===
Chart (2003)	Peak position
US Adult Contemporary (Billboard)	21

=== The Jenkins ===
Chart (2004)	Peak position
US Hot Country Songs (Billboard)	38
