= Three Hearts in the Happy Ending Machine =

Studio album by Daryl Hall
- Released: August 11, 1986
- Recorded: October 1985 – May 1986
- Studios: Studio de la Grande Armée (Paris); The Church (Crouch End); Marcus Studios (London); Right Track (New York City); Electric Lady (New York City)
- Genres: Rock; pop
- Length: 47:38
- Label: RCA Victor
- Producers: Daryl Hall; David A. Stewart; Tom "T-Bone" Wolk

Daryl Hall chronology
Sacred Songs (1980)	Three Hearts in the Happy Ending Machine (1986)	Soul Alone (1993)

Three Hearts in the Happy Ending Machine is the second solo album by American singer-songwriter Daryl Hall, released on August 11, 1986. The album features his only top-ten solo single, "Dreamtime", which peaked at number five on the Billboard Hot 100. The second single, "Foolish Pride", peaked at number 33.

== Track listing ==
All tracks are written by Daryl Hall, except where noted.

Side one
No.	Title	Writer(s)	Length
1.	"Dreamtime"	Hall; John Beeby	4:45
2.	"Only a Vision"		4:34
3.	"I Wasn't Born Yesterday"	Hall; David A. Stewart; Sara Allen	4:24
4.	"Someone Like You"		5:33
5.	"Next Step"	Hall; Stewart; Tom "T-Bone" Wolk; Arthur Baker	4:48

Side two
No.	Title	Writer(s)	Length
6.	"For You"	Hall; Stewart; Wolk	5:49
7.	"Foolish Pride"		3:57
8.	"Right as Rain"		4:23
9.	"Let It Out"	Hall; Stewart	3:51
10.	"What's Gonna Happen to Us"		5:39
Total length:			47:38

== Singles ==
The album's lead single, "Dreamtime", reached No. 5 on the Billboard Hot 100 on October 4, 1986, and remained on the chart for 15 weeks. Receiving significant play on American radio stations across multiple formats, it peaked at No. 3 on the Radio & Records CHR/Pop Airplay chart, No. 24 on the Billboard Adult Contemporary chart, and number 11 on the Album Rock Tracks chart. A club play hit as well, the remix version peaked at No. 36 on the Billboard Hot Dance/Club Play chart on October 15, 1986. The song was ranked as the 53rd most successful song of 1986 across contemporary hit radio in the United States by Radio & Records. "Dreamtime" also spent 8 weeks in the UK Singles Charts, peaking at No. 28 on August 30, 1986.

The next single, "Foolish Pride", peaked at No. 33 on the Hot 100 on the December 6, 1986, remaining on the chart for 13 weeks. It peaked at No. 29 on the Radio & Records CHR/Pop Airplay chart and No. 21 on the Adult Contemporary chart. Crossing over to the R&B charts, the single reached number 91 on the Billboard Hot Black Singles chart on December 27, 1986. The single also reached No. 29 on the Cashbox Top 100.

The third single, "I Wasn't Born Yesterday", was released only in the UK and peaked at No. 93 in the UK Singles Chart on December 20, 1986 on its second week in the charts.

The final single, "Someone Like You", went to No. 57 on the Hot 100 on February 21, 1987, during an eight-week chart run in early 1987. On the Adult Contemporary chart, it peaked at No. 11.

== Critical reception ==
Professional ratings
Review scores
Source	Rating
AllMusic	4/5 stars
Robert Christgau	C

Stephen Thomas Erlewine of AllMusic commented that 3 Hearts is a record "tied to its time", and that "although he couldn't quite pull it together at the time, of interest as a portrait of where Hall was in 1986." Robert Christgau was far more critical, giving the record a C and stating that the album was "bloated by endless codas, superfluous instrumentation, hall upon hall of vocal mirrors, and the artist's unshakable confidence that his talent makes him significant."

== Personnel ==
==== Musicians ====
- Daryl Hall – all vocals, guitars, mandolin, keyboards, drum programming
- David A. Stewart – guitars, guitar solo (1), drum programming
- Tom "T-Bone" Wolk – guitars, mandolin, bass guitar
- Robbie McIntosh – guitars, guitar solo (4)
- Ric Morcombe – guitars
- G.E. Smith – guitars
- Jamie West-Oram – guitars
- Robbie Kilgore – keyboards
- Mike Klvana – keyboards, Synclavier programming
- Patrick Seymour – keyboards, E-mu Emulator II sampling
- Stephen Gillifant – E-mu Emulator II sampling
- Dick Morrissey – saxophone solo (3)
- Lenny Pickett – saxophone
- Tony Beard – drums, additional percussion
- Jimmy Bralower – drum programming
- Manu Guiot – drum programming
- Steve Harvey – drum programming
- Bob Riley – drum programming
- Michel Delaporte – percussion
- Steve Ferrone – additional percussion
- Olle Romo – additional percussion
- Geroud – vielle
- June Montana – additional backing vocals (1)
- Kate St. John – additional backing vocals (1)
- Bob Geldof – additional backing vocals (2, 5)
- Joni Mitchell – additional backing vocals (8)
- Michael Kamen – string arrangements (1)

==== Technical ====
- Produced by Daryl Hall, Dave Stewart (1–9), and Tom "T-Bone" Wolk (1–9)
- Engineered by Manu Guiot (Studio de la Grande, Marcus Studios, Right Track Studios, Electric Lady Studios), Jon Bavin (The Church), Frank Filipetti (Right Track Studios)
- Assistant engineers – Frederick Defaye, Serge Pauchard (Studio de la Grande), Stephen Gallifent (The Church), Dick Beetham, Tim Burrell (Marcus Studios), Noah Baron, Paul Hamingson (Right Track Studios), Ken Steiger (Electric Lady Studios)
- Mixed by Bob Clearmountain (1–5, 7–10) and Frank Filipetti (6)
- Mastered by Bob Ludwig at Masterdisk (New York City, NY)
- Photography – Paul Elledge
- Hand tinting – Cheryl Winser
- Art direction and design – Jeb Brien and Joe Stelmach
- Management and direction – Tommy Mottola

== Charts ==
Chart (1986–87)	Peak position
Australia (Kent Music Report)	42
Canada Top Albums/CD's (RPM)	30
German Albums (Offizielle Top 100)	43
Netherlands Albums Chart	42
Swedish Albums (Sverigetopplistan)	12
UK Albums (Official Charts Company)	26
US Billboard 200	29
