= Abandoned Luncheonette =

1973 studio album by Hall & Oates

Studio album by Daryl Hall & John Oates
- Released: November 3, 1973
- Recorded: March–May 1973
- Studios: Atlantic Recording Studios (New York City); Advantage Sound Studios (New York City)
- Genres: Soul; blue-eyed soul; pop rock; soft rock; folk
- Length: 36:54
- Label: Atlantic
- Producer: Arif Mardin

Daryl Hall & John Oates chronology
Whole Oats (1972)	Abandoned Luncheonette (1973)	War Babies (1974)

Singles from Abandoned Luncheonette
- 1. "She's Gone" Released: November 1973; 2. "When the Morning Comes" Released: May 1974

Abandoned Luncheonette is the second studio album by the American pop rock duo Daryl Hall & John Oates, released in November 3, 1973 by Atlantic Records. It combines folk and acoustic rock. It is the most commercially successful of their Atlantic Records period; the album reached #33 on the Billboard Top LPs & Tape chart and featured one of their first major hits, "She's Gone", which found success after a 1976 reissue. Twenty-nine years after its release, the album was certified platinum (over one million copies sold) by the Recording Industry Association of America.

== Background ==
After their first album, Whole Oats, failed to make an impact, the duo moved from Philadelphia to New York and started recording Abandoned Luncheonette, which became the first album they recorded as New Yorkers. Their producer was still Arif Mardin, but they wanted to get away from the commercial standards to establish the parameters of their musical identity, and Mardin helped in that regard. Mardin liked the American musical influence that Hall & Oates had been brought up on, and knew just how to bring all their ideas to life, adding much of his own vision.

Recording that album was where we learned how songs become records. Our producer, the legendary Arif Mardin carefully crafted each song, every bit of nuance, bringing in the perfect players for the right moments. And it all worked together as one beautiful musical tapestry.

— John Oates in an interview with Chris Epting.

When Hall and Oates began producing their own records in the early 1980s, they thought back to the things they had learned from watching Mardin.

Hall was particularly satisfied with the first side of the album, calling it the "magic" side with every note "just right". The second side was markedly different due to the influence of guitarist Chris Bond, who had ambitions of becoming a producer. "In those days, [Bond] was obsessed with The Beatles", said Hall. "Whenever you hear something that sounds Beatles-esque [...] you can trace that back to Chris Bond." However, Bond's ideas were not consistent with Hall's ideas of what the album should be. As Hall describes it, he was not yet a Beatles fan when they were making the album, "so side two, if I could change anything, I’d just get rid of all that crap and let the songs be the songs."

Unlike later albums, Abandoned Luncheonette contains a relatively even songwriting split. Both partners contribute a handful of their own songs, while still making room for a few co-writes. Synthesizers were used to obtain the sound the duo wanted on the album.

== Critical reception ==
Professional ratings
Review scores
Source	Rating
AllMusic	5/5 stars
Creem	B−

Initially, the album was not very successful in the United States, though it received significant airplay on a local Minneapolis–St. Paul FM radio station, KQRS, resulting in its becoming a hit in that area. The album soon became popular on the college circuit.

We opened for amazing people—Cheech & Chong, David Bowie, Stevie Wonder. So we had all these experiences for the first time behind a record we were really proud of, and people were digging. Everything was all good.

— John Oates excerpt from an interview for Ultimate Classic Rock.

After "She's Gone" was re-released in 1976 and became a hit, the album peaked at No. 33 on the Billboard 200, but by that time the duo had left Atlantic Records and moved to RCA Records, where they would become one of the biggest acts of the 1980s.

On December 13, 2002, it was certified platinum by the RIAA.

== Notable songs ==
The most well-known track from the album is "She's Gone". While the song did not become a hit when first released as a single (it peaked at only No. 60 on the U.S. Billboard Hot 100), it gained momentum from two later covers, one by Lou Rawls and one by Tavares. After the latter cover topped the Billboard R&B chart in 1974, the original was re-released and became a top 10 pop hit in 1976, reaching No. 7 in the U.S., while the album reached No. 33 on the Billboard Top LPs & Tape chart. It is one of Hall & Oates' favorite songs.

...experiencing the city, and being exposed to a whole new level of musicianship through the goodwill and artistic choices of Arif Mardin and Atlantic Records. We felt like we were where we needed to be. We had high hopes. That space was one of the most amazing, exciting, and inspiring that I've ever experienced in my life, we'd walk out the door and see Bette Midler, Aretha Franklin, Bob Dylan, Doug Sahm, Led Zeppelin. They'd just walk in—it was crazy. Now I think back on it, and I just wish I'd taken pictures. It was a very exciting time because we were at the epicentre of what was going on in New York recording at the moment.

— John Oates excerpt from an interview for Ultimate Classic Rock.

"When the Morning Comes" was the second single released from the album. Record World said of it that the duo is "about to enjoy the first zenith of a long-shining career. Moog majesty and a hook chorus guarantees them a most beautiful 'Morning' hit to come."

Another song from the album, "Las Vegas Turnaround (The Stewardess Song)", although written by Oates, draws its inspiration from Hall's then-girlfriend and future songwriting collaborator Sara Allen, much as the later "Sara Smile" would.

== Album cover ==
The diner on the album cover was formerly the Rosedale Diner, located in Pottstown, Pennsylvania. When it went out of business, its structure was dumped in a small wooded area located along Route 724 in Kenilworth, Pennsylvania, at the entrance of Towpath Park in East Coventry Township, where the photo on the linked page was taken. Stripped by souvenir-hunters, the structure remained in place until about 1983, when Ridge Fire Company, along with the owner, burned what was left to clear the land.

The images were shot by a young fine art photographer named Barbara Wilson. She had originally met Oates in the late 1960s while they were both in college, and over the years became friendly with Hall as well.

On a warm summer day, once the album was finished, Wilson, her husband, Hall and Oates drove from New York City to the rural spot on the road about 40 miles (64 km) outside of Philadelphia. The group arranged permission to take photos of the old restaurant but they thought that the session was incomplete without getting inside. And so they snuck in and Wilson started shooting. The interior was used as the back cover. The group left after an altercation with the owner of the property.

Wilson shot the black-and-white 35mm images on an old Nikon SLR and then began a silkscreen process to create the surreal color imagery, using a different stencil for each hue and then hand-coloring the final piece. Atlantic Records bought the idea with one change, to re-do the neon tubing letters, which had all been done by hand. It was the only album cover Wilson ever did. She had also spent a day in the Atlantic studios while the album was being recorded and managed to capture a series of intimate images of the two musicians.

== Track listing ==
Side one
No.	Title	Writer(s)	Length
1.	"When the Morning Comes"	Daryl Hall	3:12
2.	"Had I Known You Better Then"	John Oates	3:22
3.	"Las Vegas Turnaround (The Stewardess Song)"	Oates	2:58
4.	"She's Gone"	Hall; Oates	5:12
5.	"I'm Just a Kid (Don't Make Me Feel Like a Man)"	Oates	3:20

Side two
No.	Title	Writer(s)	Length
6.	"Abandoned Luncheonette"	Hall	3:55
7.	"Lady Rain"	Hall; Oates	4:26
8.	"Laughing Boy"	Hall	3:30
9.	"Everytime I Look At You"	Hall	7:02
Total length:			36:54

== Personnel ==
=== Musicians ===
- Daryl Hall – lead vocals (1, 3, 4, 6–9), backing vocals (all tracks), mandolin (1, 7), electric piano (2–5), piano (6, 8), keyboards (9), arrangements
- John Oates – lead vocals (2–5, 7), backing vocals (1–7, 9), acoustic guitar (1–3, 5, 7, 9), electric guitar (4, 9), arrangements
- Christopher Bond – Mellotron (1, 4, 9), synthesizer (1, 4, 9), electric guitar (2, 4, 5, 9), acoustic guitar (3), backing vocals (6), guitar solos (9), arrangements
- Hugh McCracken – electric guitar (1, 7)
- Jerry Ricks – acoustic guitar (2, 5)
- Pat Rebillot – organ (3)
- Richard Tee – acoustic piano (6)
- Steve "Fontz" Gelfand – bass (1, 2, 4, 7, 9)
- Gordon Edwards – bass (3, 5, 6)
- Bernard Purdie – drums (1, 3–7, 9)
- Rick Marotta – drums (2), percussion (2)
- Ralph MacDonald – percussion (1, 4, 7)
- Pancho Morales – congas (3)
- Joe Farrell – oboe (1), tenor saxophone (3, 4, 6)
- Marvin Stamm – flugelhorn (8)
- Gloria Agostini – harp (6)
- John Blair – Vi-tar electric violin (7)
- Larry Packer – fiddle (9)
- Marc Horowitz – banjo (9)
- Walter F. Hohl – backing vocals (6)
- Kathy Mae Hohl – backing vocals (6)
- Ronald Wanner – backing vocals (6)
- Donald Wanner – backing vocals (6)
- Arif Mardin – bass vocal (6), string and horn arrangements

=== Technical ===
- Produced by Arif Mardin
- Engineered by Gene Paul
- Remix engineers – Lew Hahn, Christopher Bond, Jimmy Douglass, and Arif Mardin
- Production assistant – Christopher Bond
- Additional engineers (at Atlantic Recording Studios) – Lew Hahn, Jimmy Douglass, and Joel Kerr
- Additional engineer (at Advantage Sound Studios) – Alan Ade
- Album design and photography – Barbara Wilson
- Coordinator – Tommy Mottola

== Charts ==
Chart (1974)	Peak position
US Top LPs & Tape (Billboard)	33
