= Rock 'n Soul Part 1 =

1983 greatest hits album by Hall & Oates

- Default color for the album. Three other color schemes were also issued.

Greatest hits album by Daryl Hall & John Oates
- Released: October 18, 1983
- Recorded: September 1983
- Venue: Montreal Forum
- Studio: Electric Lady (New York City)
- Genres: Pop rock; blue-eyed soul; new wave; synth-pop; soft rock
- Length: 47:48
- Label: RCA Victor
- Producers: Daryl Hall; John Oates; Bob Clearmountain; Christopher Bond; Arif Mardin; Neil Kernon

Daryl Hall & John Oates chronology
H_{2}O (1982)	Rock 'n Soul Part 1 (1983)	Big Bam Boom (1984)

Alternative cover
- Greatest Hits – Rock 'n Soul Part 1 album cover

Singles from Rock 'n Soul Part 1
- 1. "Say It Isn't So" Released: October 29, 1983; 2. "Adult Education" Released: February 18, 1984

Professional ratings
Review scores
Source	Rating
Wall Street Journal	(favourable)

Rock 'n Soul Part 1 (also titled Greatest Hits – Rock 'n Soul Part 1) is a greatest hits album by American musical duo Daryl Hall & John Oates. Released by RCA Records on October 18, 1983, the album featured mostly hit singles recorded by the duo and released by RCA, along with one single from the duo's period with Atlantic Records and two previously unreleased songs recorded earlier in the year: "Say It Isn't So" and "Adult Education".

The album was originally released on LP and cassette, with sides labeled "Side One" and "Side A", and was the duo's first album to be released on the then-new compact disc format. In 2006, the album was re-released on CD by RCA and Legacy Recordings with two bonus tracks. On October 16, 2015, Mobile Fidelity Sound Lab released the album on SACD but it doesn't include the bonus tracks of the 2006 CD.

The duo paired with HBO for a concert special; it became their first for pay TV; they performed a show at the Montreal Forum in Quebec, Canada on March 10 and 11, 1983; the performance was filmed and released as a VHS called: Rock 'n Soul Live; the video was certified Gold by the RIAA on July 15, 1986, denoting shipments of 500,000. The concert premiered on HBO on March 20, 1983; it features selections from the duo's album H_{2}O; it was directed by Mike Mansfield and produced by Danny O'Donovan.

This compilation mostly features single versions of the songs.

== Artwork and packaging ==
The cover of Rock 'n Soul Part 1 was illustrated by Nancy Dwyer with photography by Larry Williams and art direction, on the original release, by Jeb Brien, Dwyer and Ron Kellum; in the cover photo, the band members are dressed in the same costumes from the music video for "One on One." The original LP release also featured a limited edition twelve-month calendar for 1984 designed by Joe Telmach. The 2006 CD release by RCA and Legacy with the reissue's art direction, design and remaster by Howard Fritzson, Bob Jones and Joseph M. Palmaccio, respectively. The CD case featured four alternate album covers on the inlay with fold-out liner notes with a reproduction of the twelve-month calendar as well as "The Rock 'n Soul Part 1 Sessions" by bassist Tom "T-Bone" Wolk.

== Track listing ==
No.	Title	Writer(s)	Original release	Length
1.	"Say It Isn't So"	Daryl Hall	New recording	4:17
2.	"Sara Smile"	Hall; John Oates	Daryl Hall & John Oates, 1975	3:09
3.	"She's Gone" (single version)	Hall; Oates	Abandoned Luncheonette, 1973	3:26
4.	"Rich Girl"	Hall	Bigger Than Both of Us, 1976	2:24
5.	"Kiss on My List"	Hall; Janna Allen	Voices, 1980	3:52
6.	"You Make My Dreams"	Hall; Oates; Sara Allen	Voices	3:07
7.	"Private Eyes" (edited version)	Hall; S. Allen; J. Allen; Warren Pash	Private Eyes, 1981	3:27
8.	"Adult Education"	Hall; Oates; S. Allen	New recording	5:23
9.	"I Can't Go for That (No Can Do)" (single version)	Hall; Oates; S. Allen	Private Eyes	3:45
10.	"Maneater"	Hall; Oates; S. Allen	H_{2}O, 1982	4:31
11.	"One on One"	Hall	H_{2}O	3:57
12.	"Wait for Me" (live at the Montreal Forum, March 1983)	Hall	X-Static, 1979	6:03
Total length:				47:48

2006 remastered CD bonus tracks
No.	Title	Writer(s)	Original release	Length
13.	"Family Man"	Tim Cross; Rick Fenn; Mike Frye; Mike Oldfield; Morris Pert; Maggie Reilly	H_{2}O	3:25
14.	"You've Lost That Lovin' Feeling"	Barry Mann; Phil Spector; Cynthia Weil	Voices	4:09
Total length:				55:23

== Personnel ==
=== The Band ===
- Daryl Hall – lead vocals, keyboards, synthesizers, guitars, vibraphone, arrangements (8)
- John Oates – lead vocals (3, 14), backing vocals, guitars, keyboards, synthesizers, arrangements (8)
- G. E. Smith – lead guitars
- Tom "T-Bone" Wolk – bass guitar, guitars, keyboards, additional backing vocals, arrangements (8)
- Mickey Curry – drums
- Charlie DeChant – saxophones, keyboards, additional backing vocals

==== Additional musicians ====
- Robbie Kilgore – keyboards (1, 8)
- Wells Christie – synthesizers (1, 8)
- Clive Smith – synthesizers (1, 8)
- Jimmy Bralower – drum programming (1)
- Nile Rodgers – arrangements (8)

=== Production ===
- Produced by Daryl Hall (1, 2, 5–12), John Oates (1, 2, 5–12), Christopher Bond (2, 4), and Arif Mardin (3)
- Co-produced by Bob Clearmountain (1, 8) and Neil Kernon (5–7, 9–11)
- Engineered by Bob Clearmountain (1, 8)
- Assistant engineer – Bruce Buchalter (1, 8)
- Remixed by Bob Clearmountain (12)
- Mastered by Bob Ludwig at Masterdisk (New York, NY)
- Illustration – Nancy Dwyer
- Art direction – Jeb Brien, Nancy Dwyer, and Ron Kellum
- Inner sleeve photography – Larry Williams
- Calendar design – Joe Stelmach
- Management and direction – Tommy Mottola (Champion Entertainment Organization)
- Joseph M. Palmaccio – remastering of 2006 reissue at Sony Music Studios (New York, NY)

== Charts ==
=== Weekly charts ===
Chart (1983–1984)	Peak position
Australian Albums (Kent Music Report)	12
Canada Top Albums/CDs (RPM)	12
Dutch Albums (Album Top 100)	9
New Zealand Albums (RMNZ)	1
Swedish Albums (Sverigetopplistan)	43
UK Albums (Official Charts)	16
US Billboard 200	7
US Top R&B/Hip-Hop Albums (Billboard)	26

=== Year-end charts ===
Chart (1984)	Position
New Zealand Albums (RMNZ)	47

== Certifications and sales ==
Region	Certification	Certified units/sales
Canada (Music Canada)	2× Platinum	200,000^{^}
New Zealand (RMNZ)	Gold	7,500^{^}
United Kingdom (BPI)	Silver	60,000^{‡}
United States (RIAA)	2× Platinum	2,000,000^{^}
^{^} Shipments figures based on certification alone.^{‡} Sales+streaming figures based on certification alone.
