= Private Eyes (Hall & Oates album) =

1981 studio album by Hall & Oates

Studio album by Daryl Hall & John Oates
- Released: September 1, 1981
- Recorded: March–June 1981
- Studio: Electric Lady Studios (New York City)
- Genres: Pop-soul; blue-eyed soul
- Length: 47:47
- Label: RCA Victor
- Producers: Daryl Hall; John Oates; Neil Kernon

Daryl Hall & John Oates chronology
Voices (1980)	Private Eyes (1981)	H_{2}O (1982)

Singles from Private Eyes
- 1. "Private Eyes" Released: August 1981; 2. "I Can't Go for That (No Can Do)" Released: December 14, 1981; 3. "Did It in a Minute" Released: March 1982; 4. "Your Imagination" Released: June 1982

Professional ratings
Review scores
Source	Rating
AllMusic	4.5/5 stars
The Rolling Stone Album Guide	3.5/5 stars

Private Eyes is the tenth studio album by American pop rock duo Daryl Hall & John Oates, released by RCA Records on September 1, 1981. The album includes two number one singles: the title track and "I Can't Go for That (No Can Do)", as well as the top-10 single "Did It in a Minute". "I Can't Go for That (No Can Do)" also spent a week at the top of the R&B chart.

== Background and writing ==
Though Daryl Hall & John Oates had performed well on the Billboard charts with "She's Gone", "Sara Smile", and "Rich Girl", the duo did not return to major mainstream success until they released a cover version of the Righteous Brothers' "You've Lost That Lovin' Feelin'" on their 1980 album, Voices. The heavy airplay eventually led to the duo's first number-one single in four years, the Voices release, "Kiss on My List" in early 1981.

As the liner notes to the 2004 Private Eyes reissue indicate, it was while Daryl Hall & John Oates were recording the follow-up album in their adopted hometown of New York City, during the spring of 1981, that "Kiss on My List" reached number one in three trade publications. Determined to follow up on their success, the duo produced Private Eyes assisted by their co-producer Neil Kernon.

== Track listing ==
Side one
No.	Title	Writer(s)	Length
1.	"Private Eyes"	Daryl Hall; Janna Allen; Sara Allen; Warren Pash	3:39
2.	"Looking for a Good Sign"	Hall	3:57
3.	"I Can't Go for That (No Can Do)"	Hall; John Oates; S. Allen	5:09
4.	"Mano a Mano"	Oates	3:56
5.	"Did It in a Minute"	Hall; J. Allen; S. Allen	3:39

Side two
No.	Title	Writer(s)	Length
6.	"Head Above Water"	Hall; Oates; S. Allen	3:36
7.	"Tell Me What You Want"	Hall; S. Allen	3:51
8.	"Friday Let Me Down"	Hall; Oates; S. Allen	3:35
9.	"Unguarded Minute"	Hall; Oates; S. Allen	4:10
10.	"Your Imagination"	Hall	3:34
11.	"Some Men"	Hall	4:15
Total length:			47:47

Expanded edition bonus tracks
No.	Title	Writer(s)	Length
12.	"Your Imagination" (12" version)	Hall	5:43
13.	"I Can't Go for That (No Can Do)" (12" version)	Hall; Oates; S. Allen	6:04
Total length:			55:20

== Personnel ==
- Daryl Hall – lead vocals (1–3, 5–7, 9–11), backing vocals, keyboards, synthesizers, mandar, mandola, mandocello, timbales, CompuRhythm
- John Oates – lead vocals (4, 8), backing vocals, guitar, mando guitar, keyboards

=== The band ===
- G.E. Smith – lead guitar
- Jerry Marotta – drums (5, 7–9, 11)
- John Siegler – bass
- Charlie DeChant – saxophone
- Larry Fast – synthesizer programming

=== Additional musicians ===
- Mickey Curry – drums (1, 2, 4, 9)
- Chuck Burgi – drums (10)
- Jeff Southworth – guitar solo (9)
- Ray Gomez – lead guitar (4)
- Jimmy Maelen – percussion
- John Jarrett – backing vocals (4)

== Production ==
- Produced by Daryl Hall, John Oates, and Neil Kernon
- Recorded and mixed by Neil Kernon
- Assistant engineer – Bruce Buchhalter
- Equipment technician – Michael Klvana
- Art direction, cover photo, and design – Ed Caraeff
- Inner sleeve photos – Lynn Goldsmith
- Management and direction – Tommy Mottola

== Singles and notable songs ==
The following singles were released from the album, with the highest charting positions listed.

#	Title	US	UK
1.	"Private Eyes"	1	32
2.	"I Can't Go for That (No Can Do)"	1	8
3.	"Did It in a Minute"	9	—
4.	"Your Imagination"	33	—

The title track of Private Eyes builds on the punchy sound of "Kiss on My List". The handclap chorus and vocal/keyboard hooks of the recording were augmented by the promotional video, featuring the band wearing detective garb (trench coats, fedoras, and suits). It was one of the duo's earliest hit videos on MTV.

While the "Private Eyes" tune remains a rock-and-soul signature of the duo, its huge success was eclipsed by the second single from the Private Eyes album—"I Can't Go for That (No Can Do)", released in December 1981 before the start of the Christmas season. It topped the pop, R&B and dance charts. It remains one of the few songs by a white act to top both pop and R&B, and among the most heavily sampled songs in the history of hip hop (for a list of acts who've covered/quoted from it, see the entry for the song).

The other charted songs from the Private Eyes album include the Top 40 hit "Your Imagination", and "Did It in a Minute", a top ten hit with a similar rhythm to "Private Eyes" and "Kiss on My List".

Among the other entries on the album is "Looking for a Good Sign", which the duo (in the original liner notes) dedicates to the original lineup of The Temptations, a major influence on Hall and Oates. The duo would eventually perform with classic Tempts vocalists David Ruffin and Eddie Kendrick at Live Aid and on their Live at the Apollo album in 1985. According to American Songwriter, Daryl Hall states: "'Looking for a Good Sign' was one of the few songs in my life that I actually dreamed. I woke up in the morning and ran to the tape recorder and sang my dream into the tape recorder and got that. It's great... it's a dream song." Hall & Oates also sang with The Temptations at their Rock and Roll Hall of Fame induction ceremony.

Hall & Oates' biggest success would come the following year with the album H_{2}O, but many critics term Private Eyes as their creative and cultural peak, not only for its artistic and commercial success but for its influence.

== Charts ==
=== Weekly charts ===
Weekly chart performance for Private Eyes
Chart (1981-1982)	Peak position
Australian Albums (Kent Music Report)	27
Canada Top Albums/CDs (RPM)	14
Dutch Albums (Album Top 100)	13
Italian Albums (Musica e dischi)	14
New Zealand Albums (RMNZ)	9
Swedish Albums (Sverigetopplistan)	17
UK Albums (Official Charts)	8
US Billboard 200	5
US Top R&B/Hip-Hop Albums (Billboard)	11

=== Year-end charts ===
1981 year-end chart performance for Private Eyes
Chart (1981)	Position
Canada Top Albums/CDs (RPM)	66

1982 year-end chart performance for Private Eyes
Chart (1982)	Position
Canada Top Albums/CDs (RPM)	66
UK Albums (BMRB)	66
US Billboard 200	16

== Certifications ==
Certifications for Private Eyes
Region	Certification	Certified units/sales
Canada (Music Canada)	Platinum	100,000^{^}
United Kingdom (BPI)	Silver	60,000^{^}
United States (RIAA)	Platinum	1,000,000^{^}
^{^} Shipments figures based on certification alone.
