= Voices (Hall & Oates album) =

1980 studio album by Hall & Oates

Studio album by Daryl Hall & John Oates
- Released: July 29, 1980
- Recorded: November 1979–April 1980
- Studios: The Hit Factory (New York City); Electric Lady Studios (New York City)
- Genres: Pop; blue-eyed soul; new wave; power pop
- Length: 43:55
- Label: RCA Victor
- Producers: Daryl Hall; John Oates

Daryl Hall & John Oates chronology
X-Static (1979)	Voices (1980)	Private Eyes (1981)

Singles from Voices
- 1. "How Does It Feel to Be Back" Released: July 1980; 2. "You've Lost That Lovin' Feelin'" Released: September 27, 1980; 3. "Kiss on My List" Released: November 1980; 4. "You Make My Dreams" Released: April 1981

Voices is the ninth studio album by American pop rock duo Daryl Hall & John Oates. The album was released on July 29, 1980, by RCA Records. It spent 100 weeks on the Billboard 200, peaking at number 17. In 2020, the album was ranked number 80 on The Greatest 80 Albums of 1980 by Rolling Stone magazine.

Professional ratings
Review scores
Source	Rating
AllMusic	4.5/5 stars
The Rolling Stone Album Guide	2.5/5 stars
Rolling Stone	(favorable)

== Background ==
The album slowly became a massive hit, spinning off four singles into the top 40 of the American pop charts: "How Does It Feel to Be Back" (number 30 in summer, 1980), a cover of The Righteous Brothers' "You've Lost That Lovin' Feelin'" (number 12 in fall, 1980), "Kiss on My List" (number 1 for three weeks in spring, 1981), and "You Make My Dreams" (number 5 in summer, 1981). "Everytime You Go Away" was not released as a single but was covered by Paul Young in 1985, when it went to number 1 on the Billboard Hot 100 on July 27, 1985.

Voices was the first album that Hall & Oates produced by themselves, working in conjunction with renowned engineer Neil Kernon.

== Composition ==
Voices has been described as a pop, blue-eyed soul, new wave and power pop album, with elements of avant-garde.

== Track listing ==
Side one
No.	Title	Writer(s)	Length
1.	"How Does It Feel to Be Back"	John Oates	4:35
2.	"Big Kids"	Daryl Hall; Oates	3:40
3.	"United State"	Hall; Oates	3:08
4.	"Hard to Be in Love with You"	Hall; Oates; Neil Jason	3:38
5.	"Kiss on My List"	Hall; Janna Allen	4:25
6.	"Gotta Lotta Nerve (Perfect Perfect)"	Hall; Sara Allen	3:37

Side two
No.	Title	Writer(s)	Length
7.	"You've Lost That Lovin' Feelin'"	Barry Mann; Phil Spector; Cynthia Weil	4:37
8.	"You Make My Dreams"	Hall; Oates; S. Allen	3:10
9.	"Everytime You Go Away"	Hall	5:23
10.	"Africa"	Oates	3:39
11.	"Diddy Doo Wop (I Hear the Voices)"	Hall; Oates	3:43
Total length:			43:55

Japanese release bonus tracks
No.	Title	Writer(s)	Length
12.	"Kiss on My List" (remix version)	Hall; J. Allen	5:41
13.	"Everytime You Go Away" (remix version)	Hall	5:06
Total length:			54:55

== Personnel ==
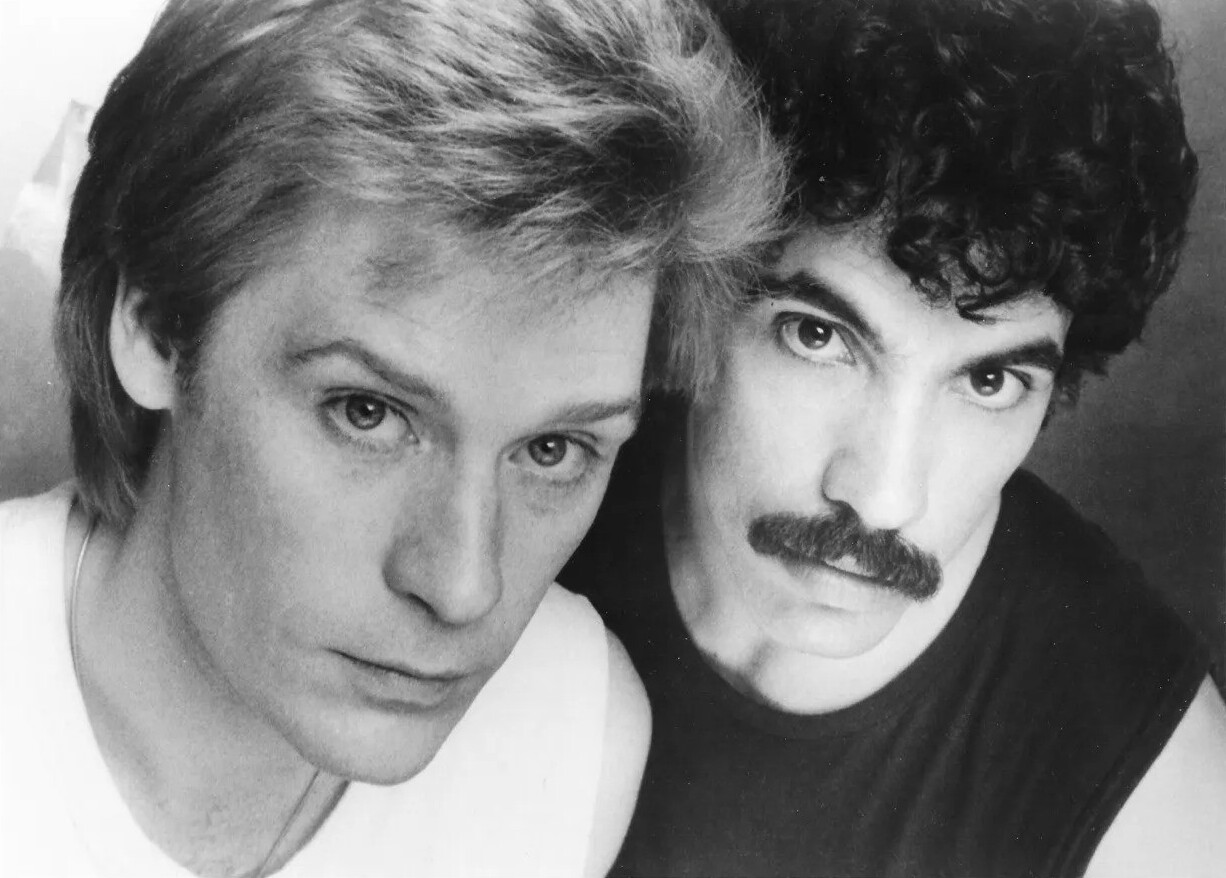
Hall & Oates in a publicity photo for Voices, 1980

=== The Band ===
- Daryl Hall – lead vocals (2–9, 11), backing vocals, Mandar, piano, keyboards, vocoder, synthesizers, percussion
- John Oates – lead vocals (1, 4, 7, 10), backing vocals, guitars, 12-string guitar, percussion, Roland CR-78
- G. E. Smith – guitar
- John Siegler – bass
- Charlie DeChant – saxophone
- Jerry Marotta – drums
- Chuck Burgi – drums, percussion

==== Additional musicians ====
- Jeff Southworth – guitar solo (5)
- Ralph Schuckett – organ (9)
- Mike Klvana – synthesizers (10), equipment technician

=== Technical ===
- Produced by Daryl Hall and John Oates
- Engineered by Neil Kernon and Bruce Tergeson
- Assistant engineers – Jon Smith and John Palermo
- Mixed by Neil Kernon
- Mastered by Bob Ludwig at Masterdisk, New York City
- Album cover design – Sara Allen
- Photography – Ebet Roberts
- Art director – J.J. Stelmach, RCA
- VSP – Randy Hofman

== Charts and certifications ==
The album debuted at number 75 on the Billboard Top LPs & Tape chart the week of August 16, 1980 as the highest debut of the week. After ten months since its debut on the chart, it peaked at number 17 on June 13, 1981, making it their highest-charting album since 1975 when Daryl Hall & John Oates also peaked at number 17. It remained on the chart for one hundred weeks, more than any other album by the duo. It was certified gold by the RIAA on May 6, 1981, for shipments of 500,000 units, and reached platinum status on January 22, 1982, denoting shipments of one million.

=== Weekly charts ===
Chart (1980–1981)	Peak position
Australian Albums (Kent Music Report)	19
US Billboard 200	17

=== Certifications ===
Region	Certification	Certified units/sales
Canada (Music Canada)	Gold	50,000^{^}
United States (RIAA)	Platinum	1,000,000^{^}
^{^} Shipments figures based on certification alone.

=== Singles ===
Release date	Title	Hot 100	UK singles
July 1980	"How Does It Feel to Be Back"	30	–
September 1980	"You've Lost That Lovin' Feelin'"	12	55
November 1980	"Kiss on My List"	1	33
April 1981	"You Make My Dreams"	5	–

== Bibliography ==
- Oates, John (2017), Change of Seasons: A Memoir, St. Martin's Press, ISBN 978-1-250-08266-4
