= G. E. Smith =

American songwriter

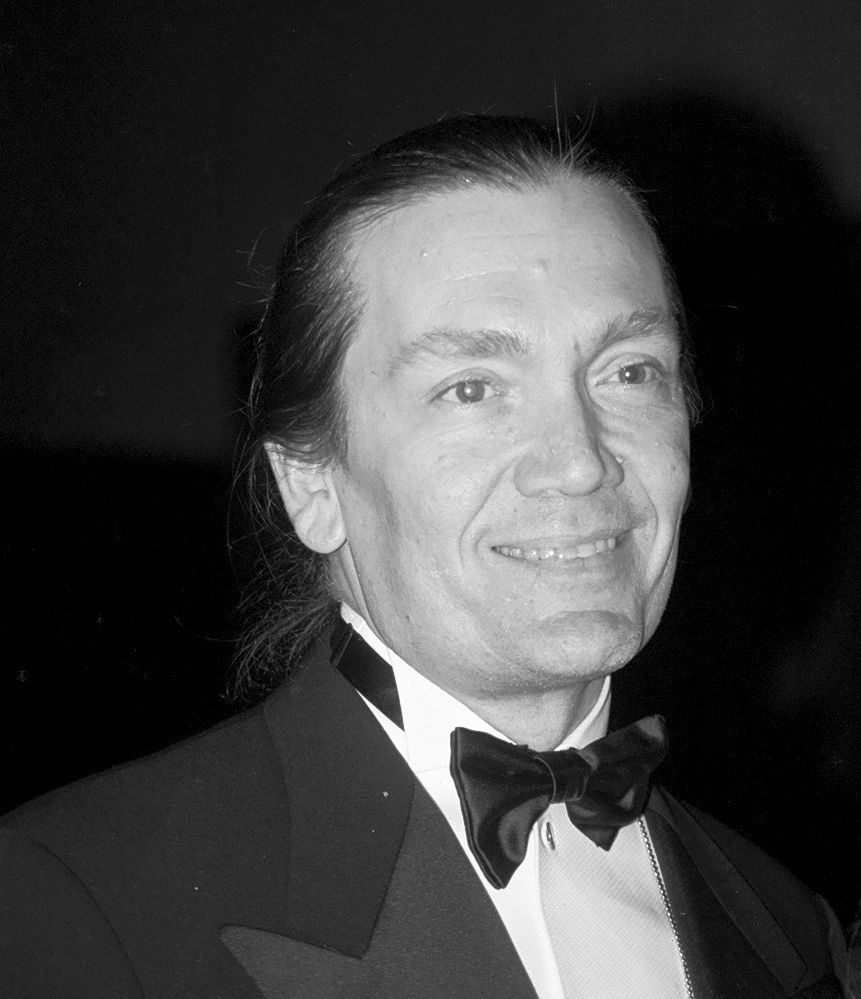
- Smith in 2001

Background information
- Born: George Edward Haddad; January 27, 1952 (age 74); Scranton, Pennsylvania, U.S.
- Origin: Stroudsburg, Pennsylvania, U.S.
- Genres: Rock; pop rock; soul
- Occupations: Musician; songwriter
- Instruments: Guitar; lap steel guitar; bass
- Years active: 1977–present
- Formerly of: Saturday Night Live Band
- Spouses: Gilda Radner (m. 1980; div. 1982) Taylor Barton (m. 1990)
- Website: gesmithmusic.com

George Edward Smith (né Haddad; born January 27, 1952) is an American guitarist. Smith was the lead guitarist for the duo Hall & Oates during the band's heyday from 1979 to 1985, playing on several albums and five number one singles. When Hall & Oates took a hiatus in 1985, Smith joined the sketch-comedy show Saturday Night Live, serving as bandleader and co-musical director of the Saturday Night Live Band.

Smith has recorded and performed with many acclaimed artists, including David Bowie, Mick Jagger, Bob Dylan, Roger Waters, Tina Turner, Tracy Chapman, Tom Waits and Dan Hartman. He was the initial lead guitarist in Bob Dylan's Never Ending Tour band from 1988 to 1990 and also served as musical director and a guitarist of Dylan's The 30th Anniversary Concert Celebration at Madison Square Garden in 1992. From 2010 to 2013, Smith was the rhythm, lead and bass guitarist in Roger Waters's The Wall Live tour, one of the highest-grossing concert tours of all time.

He received a Grammy Award nomination along with Buddy Guy in 1997 for the album Live! The Real Deal along with the Saturday Night Live Band as well as an Emmy Award for the Saturday Night Live: The 25th Anniversary Special in 2000. His albums as a solo artist include In the World (1981), Get a Little (with the Saturday Night Live Band, 1993), Incense, Herbs and Oils (1998) and Stony Hill (2020) with Leroy Bell.

== Early life ==
Smith was born January 27, 1952, in Scranton, Pennsylvania, as George Edward Haddad. His father was Lebanese and his mother was English from Ohio. His last name, Haddad, is Arabic for blacksmith. Growing up in Stroudsburg, Pennsylvania, Smith started playing guitar at the age of 4. In 1959, at the age of 7, he was given a C. F. Martin guitar. On his 11th birthday Smith's mother bought him his first electric guitar, a Fender Esquire, a model that dated to 1952, his birth year. As a teen he was already earning money as a musician, playing in various venues, including resorts and high school dances in the Pocono Mountains in Northeastern Pennsylvania.

== Career ==
=== Early career ===
In the early 1970s, Smith left Northeastern Pennsylvania for the New Haven, Connecticut, area, where he played in a group called The Scratch Band, which also included his future Hall & Oates bandmate Mickey Curry. In late 1977, Smith got his first break when he joined Dan Hartman on his successful album Instant Replay, including its hit title track, and played guitar on Hartman’s US and European tour. Upon his return to the East Coast, Smith moved to Manhattan and became the guitarist for Gilda Radner's 1979 Broadway show Gilda Live. Radner and Smith became friends and married shortly afterward, divorcing in 1982. In 1981, Smith released his first solo album, In the World.

=== Hall & Oates ===
From 1979 to 1985, Smith played lead guitar with Daryl Hall and John Oates, a band which also included Tom "T-Bone" Wolk, Charles DeChant and Mickey Curry. With Hall & Oates, Smith scored five U.S. #1 singles, including "Private Eyes", "Kiss on My List", "Maneater", "I Can't Go for That (No Can Do)", and "Out of Touch" as well as five consecutive multi-platinum albums: Voices, Private Eyes, H2O, Rock 'n Soul Part 1 and Big Bam Boom. Other U.S. Top 10 singles included "Family Man", "Say It Isn't So", "Did It in a Minute" and "Method of Modern Love".

=== Saturday Night Live era ===
From 1985 to 1995, Smith served as the Saturday Night Live band's bandleader and co-musical director, along with longtime SNL band keyboardist Cheryl Hardwick. Smith had become acquainted with SNL creator Lorne Michaels through show alumna Gilda Radner, to whom Smith was married from 1980 to 1982. After a five-year absence, Michaels was back at the show's helm for the 1985–1986 season, and hired Smith as part of his retooling. During his tenure on the show, Smith (alongside bandmate T-Bone Wolk) became well-known to television audiences for his emotive performances during "band shots," brief snippets of the band playing before SNL went to commercial break. Smith and Wolk were parodied in this capacity in a 1993 episode of The Simpsons. In addition to his onstage duties, Smith also advised Michaels on which musical acts to book on the show.

In the midst of his SNL tenure, Smith toured with Bob Dylan for the first 281 concerts of the Never Ending Tour from June 1988 until October 1990. He also served as the musical director for special events such as the 1988 Emmy Awards, the 1993 Rhythm and Blues Foundation Awards, Bob Dylan's 30th Anniversary Concert at Madison Square Garden as well as acting as the musical director at the Rock and Roll Hall of Fame Concert in Cleveland.

Smith was fired from SNL after the disastrous 1994–1995 season, which saw the show's lowest ratings in nineteen years. Smith was part of the same exodus that also saw the dismissal of 12 of the show's 15 cast members. He was replaced as bandleader by saxophonist Lenny Pickett and keyboardist Cheryl Hardwick.

=== Post-SNL career ===
In 1996, Smith received a Grammy nomination for his work with Buddy Guy on the album Live: The Real Deal. Smith released his third solo album, Incense, Herbs and Oils in 1998. Smith served as the musical director and band leader honoring Bob Dylan and Willie Nelson at the Kennedy Center Honors in Washington, D.C. He also led bands for the Muddy Waters tribute and the 1998 and 1999 Mark Twain Awards honoring Richard Pryor and Jonathan Winters, which aired on PBS and Comedy Central, respectively.

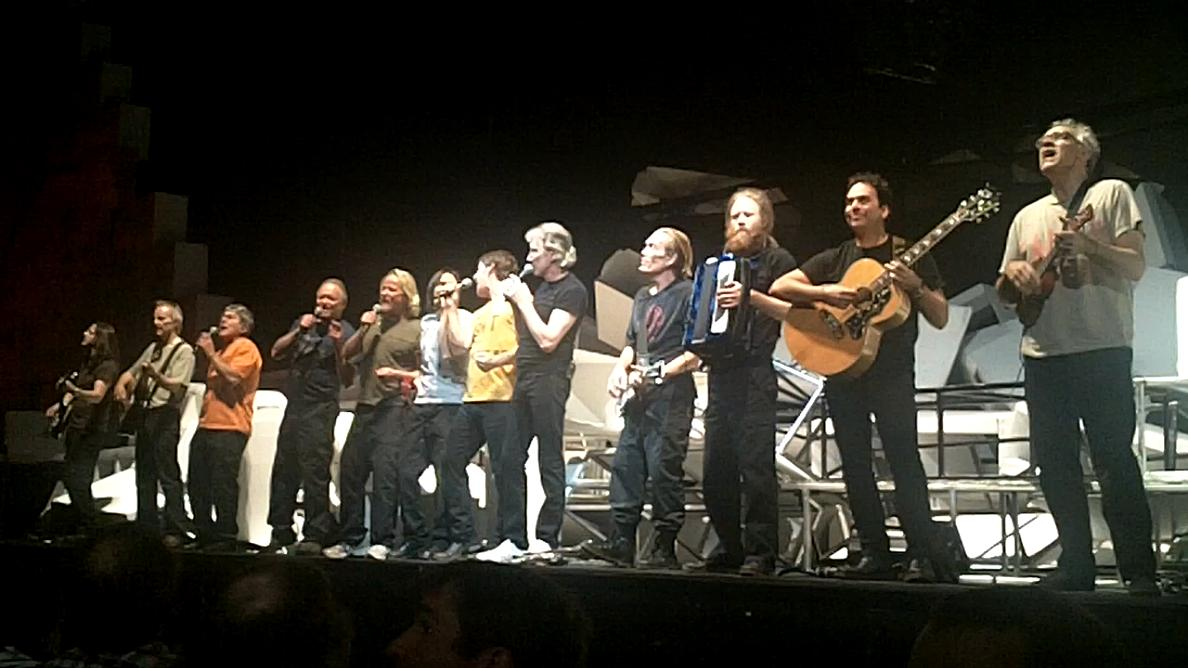
G. E. Smith with the Roger Waters Band in The Wall Live tour, 2010

From 2004 to 2006, Smith performed classic rock songs—as well as his own song, "Brownstown"—at home games for the Cleveland Browns.

In 2005, Smith and his band appeared on the Comedy Central Roast of Jeff Foxworthy and did a performance with the band Bama.

Smith toured with Roger Waters during the 2010–2013 tour The Wall Live. On December 12, 2012, he performed with Waters at Madison Square Gardens for The Concert for Sandy Relief.

In August 2012, Smith performed for the Republican Party and Mitt Romney at the 2012 Republican National Convention in Tampa Bay, Florida, as the convention's house band. However, Smith said that he is not a Republican or political and saw the event as "just another job". In July 2016, Smith again led the house band for candidate Donald Trump at the 2016 Republican National Convention in Ohio.

Smith was one of the many guests appearing on NBC's Saturday Night Live 40th Anniversary Special on February 15, 2015. Ten years later, he also appeared on the 50th Anniversary Special.

Smith has performed with Jim Weider—formerly of the Band and member of the Weight Band—on their Masters of the Telecaster series.

Smith and his wife Taylor Barton founded the concert series Portraits in 2015. Portraits has hosted artists including Billy Squier, Ethan Hawke, the Bacon Brothers, and the Avett Brothers.

Smith made a cameo appearance in the music video "Sudden Signs of Grace" (2020) by guitarist/songwriter Tom Guerra.

== Personal life ==
Smith was married to comedian Gilda Radner (1980–1982) and has been married to singer/songwriter Taylor Barton since 1990. He has one daughter named Josie.

== Discography ==
with Hall & Oates (also as arranger)

- X-Static (1979)
- Voices (1980)
- Private Eyes (1981)
- H2O (1982)
- Greatest Hits Live (1982), released in 2001
- Rock 'n Soul Part 1 (Compilation) (1983)
- Big Bam Boom (1984)
- Sweet Soul Music (Live) (1984)
- Live at the Apollo (1985)
- Ecstasy on the Edge (2001)

with Dan Hartman

- Instant Replay (1978)
- Relight My Fire (1979)

with Tom Waits

- Downtown Train (1985)

with Mick Jagger

- She's The Boss (1985)
- "Dancing in the Street" w/David Bowie (1985)
- Primitive Cool (1987)
- The Very Best of Mick Jagger (2007)

with Carly Simon

- Tired of Being Blonde (1985), also producer

with Ric Ocasek

- This Side of Paradise (1986)

with Bob Dylan

- Bob Dylan: The 30th Anniversary Concert Celebration (1993), also musical director
- By the Waterfront Docks (1989) (2007)
- The House of Gold (Greece, 1989) (2009)
- Crossroads w/Eric Clapton (1988, 1999) (2012)
- Carnival to Rio (1990) (2012)
- Mercy for Poughkeepsie (1988–1989) (2014)
- East Troy 1988 (2015)

with Tracy Chapman

- Crossroads (1989)
- Greatest Hits (2015)

with Jimmy Buffett

- Fruitcakes (1994)

with Buddy Guy

- Live: The Real Deal (with the Saturday Night Live Band, 1996), received Grammy nomination
- Buddy's Baddest: The Best of Buddy Guy (1999)
- Can't Quit the Blues (2006)
- The Definite Buddy Guy (2009)

with Moonalice

- Compliments from Moonalice (2007)
- Moonalice (2008)
- The Jewish Mother, Virginia Beach, VA (2008)

with Roger Waters

- Roger Waters: The Wall (Live Album) (2010–2013), released 2015

with David Bowie

- Loving the Alien (1983–1988) (2018)

Solo Albums

- In the World (1981)
- Get a Little (with the Saturday Night Live Band, 1993)
- Incense, Herbs and Oils (1998)
- Stony Hill (2020) w/Leroy Bell

As producer/composer

- Wayne's World Theme (1992)

== Videography ==
As band member/performer or musical director

- "Instant Replay" (official song video) w/Dan Hartman (1978)
- "Fashion" (official song video) w/David Bowie (1980)
- "Station To Station" w/David Bowie - (from the movie Christiane F ) 1980
- "Wait for me" (official song video) w/Hall & Oates (1979)
- "Private Eyes" (official song video) w/Hall & Oates (1981)
- "Did it in a Minute" (official song video) w/Hall & Oates (1982)
- "Your Imagination" (official song video) w/Hall & Oates (1982)
- "Maneater" (official song video) w/Hall & Oates (1982)
- "Family Man" (official song video) w/Hall & Oates (1983)
- "Say It Isn't So" (official song video) w/Hall & Oates (1983)
- "Out of Touch" (official song video) w/Hall & Oates (1984)
- "Possession Obsession" (official song video) w/Hall & Oates (1984)
- "Adult Education" (official song video) w/Hall & Oates (1984)
- "Method of Modern Love" (official song video) w/Hall & Oates (1985)
- "Some Things Are Better Left Unsaid" (official song video) w/Hall & Oates (1985)

=== Live performances and concerts ===
- Live on the Johnny Carson show with David Bowie,1980
- Daryl Hall & John Oates - Rock N' Soul Live (1983)
- Hall & Oates: The Liberty Concert (1985)
- Bob Dylan: The 30th Anniversary Concert Celebration (1993), DVD Deluxe Edition (2014)
- The Kennedy Center Presents: A Tribute to Muddy Waters: King of the Blues (1998)
- The Kennedy Center Honors: A Celebration of the Performing Arts, 2000
- On Stage at the Kennedy Center: The Mark Twain Prize, 2002
- Roger Waters: The Wall (concert film based on The Wall Live (2010–13) tour), 2014

=== Saturday Night Live specials ===
- Saturday Night Live: 15th Anniversary (TV Special), 1989
- Saturday Night Live: The Best of Robin Williams (TV Special), 1991
- Saturday Night Live: The Best of Steve Martin (TV Special), 1998
- Saturday Night Live: The Best of Mike Myers (TV Special), 1998
- Saturday Night Live 25th Anniversary (TV Special), 1999, received an Emmy Award
- Saturday Night Live: The Best of Tom Hanks (TV Special), 2004
- Saturday Night Live in the '90s: Pop Culture Nation, (TV Special documentary), 2007
- Saturday Night Live: 40th Anniversary Special, 2015
- Saturday Night Live: 50th Anniversary Special, 2025
