= Big Bam Boom =

1984 studio album by Hall & Oates

Studio album by Daryl Hall & John Oates
- Released: October 12, 1984
- Recorded: Summer 1984
- Studios: Electric Lady, New York City
- Genres: Pop rock; dance-rock
- Length: 40:13
- Label: RCA Victor
- Producers: Daryl Hall; John Oates; Bob Clearmountain

Daryl Hall & John Oates chronology
Rock 'n Soul Part 1 (1983)	Big Bam Boom (1984)	Live at the Apollo (1985)

Singles from Big Bam Boom
- 1. "Out of Touch" Released: October 1984; 2. "Method of Modern Love" Released: December 1984; 3. "Some Things Are Better Left Unsaid" Released: March 1985; 4. "Possession Obsession" Released: May 1985

Big Bam Boom is the twelfth studio album by American duo Daryl Hall & John Oates, released by RCA Records on October 12, 1984. It marked the end of one of the most successful album runs by a duo of the 1980s. RCA issued a remastered version in July 2004 with four bonus tracks. The lead single "Out of Touch" was a #1 pop hit, and charted in several other areas (#24 Hot Black Singles, #8 on the Adult Contemporary charts and #1 on the dance charts, #48 in the UK). Another song, the Daryl Hall and Janna Allen-penned "Method of Modern Love", reached #5, and "Some Things Are Better Left Unsaid" reached #18.

Musical styles on the album include pop, rock, and dance-rock, with R&B/soul influences. It has even more of an electronic, urban feel to it than their previous albums, combining their song structure and vocals with the latest technical advances in recording and playing. The album employed some of the most sophisticated equipment used in the recording industry at the time.

Big Bam Boom peaked at No. 5 in the United States and sold over three million copies worldwide.

== Background and recording ==
The making of Big Bam Boom involved a mixture of traditional recordings and state-of-the-art technologies.

We embraced each new device on its merits as a tool to enhance and integrate into the recording process. For us, they were instruments to be used to achieve an end: service and enrich the songs.

— John Oates in his autobiography.

The duo opted to record on analog tape rather than the then-new digital multitrack machines, and due to their commercial success they were able to take advantage of the latest musical devices available at the time, specially the most advanced sampling synthesizers like Synclavier and the Fairlight. Drums were largely provided by the LinnDrum drum machine and Simmons electronic drums, and utilized MIDI extensively across multiple polyphonic synthesizers to experiment with new sounds. The duo came up with basic demos & ideas at home rather than complete songs, leaving more to the studio to dictate the songs' development. Each song started with a drum machine, a bass part and layering other instruments– keyboards, guitars & drums–on top rather than playing as an ensemble.

Bob Clearmountain, one of the producers and drummer Mickey Curry recorded various drum sounds, manipulating delays and reverbs to create huge dramatic bottom end that is emblematic of this album and the 1980s in general.

== Promotion ==
To promote the album, the duo embarked on the Big Bam Boom Tour – Live Through '85; they did most of the travel in a private plane. MTV provided tour date and ticket outlet announcements and the channel's name appeared on all tickets and print advertising, and was tagged on all radio spots. The duo performed a show at The Forum in Inglewood, California, on December 17, 1984, with a satellite-delivered live broadcast of the concert; it aired the following day. The radio broadcast was remastered and released on CD, via music download and streaming in 2015 under the title: The LA Forum – 17 Dec 1984.

== Critical reception ==
Professional ratings
Review scores
Source	Rating
AllMusic	3/5 stars
Robert Christgau	B
The Rolling Stone Album Guide	3/5 stars

In a review for AllMusic, Stephen Thomas Erlewine called Big Bam Boom "a sprawling and diffuse album" and "a bigger, noisier record than its predecessors, with its rhythms smacking around in an echo chamber and each track built on layers of synthesizers and studio effects". In Erlewine's opinion, it was a disappointment coming after a trio of albums that had very few flaws. Erlewine also criticized the production on the album saying that "it obscures the dark undercurrent to many of the tunes, several of which seem to foreshadow the duo's long hiatus following this record".

== Track listing ==
Side one
No.	Title	Writer(s)	Length
1.	"Dance on Your Knees"	Daryl Hall; Arthur Baker	1:25
2.	"Out of Touch"	Hall; John Oates	4:21
3.	"Method of Modern Love"	Hall; Janna Allen	5:32
4.	"Bank on Your Love"	Hall; Oates; Sara Allen	4:17
5.	"Some Things Are Better Left Unsaid"	Hall	5:27

Side two
No.	Title	Writer(s)	Length
6.	"Going Thru the Motions"	Hall; Oates; S. Allen; J. Allen	5:39
7.	"Cold Dark and Yesterday" (title by G.E. Smith)	Oates	4:41
8.	"All American Girl"	Hall; Oates; S. Allen	4:28
9.	"Possession Obsession"	Hall; Oates; S. Allen	4:36
Total length:			40:13

=== 2004 remastered edition ===
Bonus tracks
No.	Title	Writer(s)	Length
10.	"Out of Touch" (12" version)	Hall; Oates	7:35
11.	"Method of Modern Love" (12" version)	Hall; J. Allen	7:48
12.	"Possession Obsession" (12" version)	Hall; Oates; S. Allen	6:28
13.	"Dance on Your Knees" (12" version)	Hall; Baker	6:38
Total length:			69:11

== Personnel ==
Credits adapted from the album's liner notes.

=== The Band ===
- Daryl Hall – lead vocals (2–6, 8), backing vocals, synthesizers, guitar, arrangements
- John Oates – lead vocals (7, 9), backing vocals, guitar, synth-guitar, synthesizers, Roland JX-8P, arrangements
- Tom "T-Bone" Wolk – bass, synthesizer, guitar, arrangements
- G.E. Smith – lead guitar
- Mickey Curry – drums
- Charles DeChant – saxophone

==== Additional musicians ====
- Robbie Kilgore – keyboards, synthesizer programming
- Jimmy Bralower – LinnDrum
- Wells Christy – Synclavier
- Clive Smith – Fairlight CMI
- Bashiri Johnson – timbale
- Jay Burnett – additional percussion
- Coati Mundi – dissertation in Español (1)

=== Technical ===
- Produced by Daryl Hall, John Oates, and Bob Clearmountain
- Engineered and mixed by Bob Clearmountain
- Mix consultant and additional production – Arthur Baker
- Additional engineer – Jay Burnett
- Assistant engineers – Michael Sauvage, Bruce Buchalter, and Gary Hellman
- Mastered by Bob Ludwig at Masterdisk (New York, NY)
- Keyboard technician – Mike Klvana
- Keyboard and synth-drum technician – Anthony Aquilato
- Art direction – Mick Haggerty
- Photography – Jean Pagliuso and Larry Williams
- Management and direction – Tommy Mottola

==== 2004 Remaster ====
- Remixing – Arthur Baker (10–13)
- Editing – The Latin Rascals (10–13)

== Charts and certifications ==
The album debuted at number 33 on the Billboard 200 the week of October 27, 1984 as the highest debut of the week. After five weeks it peaked at number five on the chart on December 1, 1984. The album remained on the chart for 51 weeks and was ranked as the 17th most successful album of 1985 on the Billboard 200. Additionally, it reached number 25 on the Top R&B/Hip-Hop Albums chart the week of January 12, 1985.

By December 1984, the album had sold one million copies in the US, and was certified Platinum on December 3, 1984. Eventually, it sold an additional one million copies, and was certified double Platinum by the RIAA on April 1, 1985.

In the United Kingdom the album debuted and peaked at number 28 on October 28, 1984 and was present on the chart for 13 weeks. It was certified Silver by the BPI on February 1, 1985 for shipments of 60,000.

=== Weekly charts ===
Chart (1984)	Peak position
Australian Albums (Kent Music Report)	20
Canada Top Albums/CDs (RPM)	12
Dutch Albums (Album Top 100)	43
German Albums (Offizielle Top 100)	47
New Zealand Albums (RMNZ)	12
Swedish Albums (Sverigetopplistan)	16
UK Albums (Official Charts)	28
US Billboard 200	5
US Top R&B/Hip-Hop Albums (Billboard)	25

=== Year-end charts ===
Chart (1985)	Position
US Billboard 200	17

=== Certifications ===
Region	Certification	Certified units/sales
Canada (Music Canada)	2× Platinum	200,000^{^}
United Kingdom (BPI)	Silver	60,000^{^}
United States (RIAA)	2× Platinum	2,000,000^{^}
^{^} Shipments figures based on certification alone.

== Bibliography ==
- Oates, John (2017), Change of Seasons: A Memoir (e-Book ed.), St. Martin's Press, ISBN 978-1-250-08266-4
