= Private Eyes (song) =

1981 single by Hall & Oates

- Side-A label of the US 7-inch vinyl single

Single by Daryl Hall & John Oates

from the album Private Eyes
- B-side: "Tell Me What You Want" (US, Canada, UK, South Africa, Spain); "I Can't Go for That (No Can Do)" (Italy, Bolivia); "Head Above Water" (Italy promo single)
- Released: August 1981
- Studio: Electric Lady, New York City
- Genre: Pop, blue-eyed soul
- Length: 3:29 (album version); 3:09 (UK Mix)
- Label: RCA Records
- Songwriters: Warren Pash, Sara Allen, Janna Allen, Daryl Hall
- Producers: Daryl Hall, John Oates, Neil Kernon

Daryl Hall & John Oates singles chronology
"You Make My Dreams" (1981)	"Private Eyes" (1981)	"I Can't Go for That (No Can Do)" (1981)

Music video
- "Private Eyes" on YouTube

"Private Eyes" is a 1981 single by American duo Daryl Hall & John Oates and the title track from their album of the same name. The song was number one on the Billboard Hot 100 charts for two weeks, from November 7 through November 20, 1981. This single was the band's third of six number one hits (the first two being "Rich Girl" and "Kiss on My List"), and their second number one hit of the 1980s. It was succeeded in the number one position by Olivia Newton-John's "Physical", which was coincidentally succeeded by another single from Hall & Oates, "I Can't Go for That (No Can Do)".

== Background and writing ==
The tune for "Private Eyes" was written by Warren Pash and Janna Allen, with arrangement and chords by Daryl Hall. In an interview with American Songwriter, Daryl Hall states: "That's a real Janna Allen (co-writer and sister of Sara Allen) song. Janna, and I, and Warren Pash wrote that. Warren and Janna wrote most of the song, and I took it and changed it around – changed the chords. Sandy (Sara Allen) and I wrote the lyrics. It's a real family song, the Allen sisters and me."

The single carries a similar rhythm to the duo's number one hit from earlier that year, "Kiss on My List", with the difference being a handclap chorus that has made the song an audience-participation favorite at live Hall and Oates shows. It was one of the duo's first songs to appear in heavy rotation on MTV.

Record World called it a "perfectly-crafted title cut" from the album.

== Music video ==
The music video features the band dressed as stereotypical film-noir style, trenchcoat-wearing private detectives.

It was the first to feature the backup band of guitarist G. E. Smith, bassist Tom "T-Bone" Wolk, drummer Mickey Curry, and saxophonist/keyboardist Charles DeChant.

== Personnel ==
- Daryl Hall – lead and backing vocals, keyboards, synthesizer
- John Oates – rhythm guitar, backing vocals
- G.E. Smith – lead guitar
- John Siegler - bass
- Mickey Curry – drums

== Charts ==
=== Weekly charts ===
Chart (1981–1982)	Peak position
Australia (Kent Music Report)	17
Canada Top Singles (RPM)	6
New Zealand (Recorded Music NZ)	19
South Africa (Springbok Radio)	14
UK Singles (Official Charts)	32
US Billboard Hot 100	1
US Adult Contemporary (Billboard)	33
US Mainstream Rock Airplay (Billboard)	33

=== Year-end charts ===
Chart (1981)	Rank
Canada (RPM)	37

Chart (1982)	Rank
US Billboard Hot 100	44

== Certifications ==
Region	Certification	Certified units/sales
Canada (Music Canada)	Gold	50,000^{^}
New Zealand (RMNZ)	Gold	15,000^{‡}
United States (RIAA)	Gold	1,000,000^{^}
^{^} Shipments figures based on certification alone.^{‡} Sales+streaming figures based on certification alone.

== See also ==
- List of Billboard Hot 100 number-one singles of 1981
