= Live at the Apollo (Hall & Oates album) =

1985 live album by Hall & Oates, David Ruffin and Eddie Kendricks

Live album by Daryl Hall & John Oates with David Ruffin and Eddie Kendricks
- Released: August 15, 1985
- Recorded: May 23, 1985
- Venues: Apollo Theater, New York City
- Genre: Pop rock
- Length: 51:00
- Label: RCA Victor
- Producers: Daryl Hall; John Oates; Bob Clearmountain

Hall & Oates chronology
Big Bam Boom (1984)	Live at the Apollo (1985)	Ooh Yeah! (1988)

David Ruffin chronology
Gentleman Ruffin (1980)	Live at the Apollo (1985)	Ruffin & Kendrick (1988)

Eddie Kendricks chronology
I've Got My Eyes on You (1983)	Live at the Apollo (1985)	Ruffin & Kendrick (1988)

Professional ratings
Review scores
Source	Rating
AllMusic	2.5/5 stars

Live at the Apollo is the second live album by Daryl Hall & John Oates, released on August 15, 1985. It was recorded live at the Apollo Theater in New York on May 23, 1985, with special guests David Ruffin and Eddie Kendricks of The Temptations-fame. The album is a mixture of their classics and some then-current songs by Hall & Oates. A VHS video of this concert with a different running order was released in 1987.

Hall, Oates, Ruffin, and Kendricks also performed together at Live Aid on July 13, 1985.

== Track listing ==
"Side 1"
No.	Title	Writer(s)	Length
1.	"Apollo Medley" ("Get Ready"/"Ain't Too Proud To Beg"/"The Way You Do the Things You Do"/"My Girl")	Smokey Robinson; Norman Whitfield; Eddie Holland; Robert Rogers; Ronald White	12:49
2.	"When Something Is Wrong with My Baby"	Isaac Hayes; David Porter	4:44
3.	"Everytime You Go Away"	Daryl Hall	7:07

Side two
No.	Title	Writer(s)	Length
4.	"I Can't Go for That (No Can Do)"	Hall; John Oates; Sara Allen	7:58
5.	"One on One"	Hall	5:50
6.	"Possession Obsession"	Hall; Oates; Allen	5:54
7.	"Adult Education"	Hall; Oates; Allen	6:34
Total length:			51:00

On some releases, the "Apollo Medley" is separated into individual tracks.

== Personnel ==
- Daryl Hall – lead vocals (1–5, 7), keyboards (4–7)
- John Oates – lead vocals (2, 6), backing vocals, guitars (3–5, 7)
- G.E. Smith – lead guitar
- Tom "T-Bone" Wolk – bass guitar, backing vocals
- Mickey Curry – drums
- Charlie DeChant – saxophone, synthesizers, backing vocals
- David Ruffin – vocals (1)
- Eddie Kendricks – vocals (1)

=== Additional musicians ===
- Michael Klvana – synthesizers (off-stage)
- Wells Christie – Synclavier (off-stage)
- Robbie Kilgore – keyboards (1, 2), organ (3), synthesizers
- Jimmy Maelen – percussion
- Lenny Pickett – tenor saxophone (1–3), horn section leader
- Steve Elson – baritone saxophone (1–3)
- Mac Gollehon – trumpet (1–3)
- "Hollywood" Paul Litteral – trumpet (1–3)
- Ray Anderson – trombone (1–3)

=== Technical ===
- Produced by Daryl Hall, John Oates, and Bob Clearmountain
- Recorded by Bob Clearmountain and David Hewitt (Record Plant Truck, N.Y.C.)
- Mixed by Bob Clearmountain
- Mastered by Bob Ludwig at Masterdisk (New York, NY)
- Album artwork and design – Mick Haggerty
- Inner sleeve photography – Lynn Goldsmith and Nina Krieger
- Management and direction – Tommy Mottola (Champion Entertainment Organization, Inc.)

== Charts ==
Chart (1985)	Peak position
Australian Albums (Kent Music Report)	39
Canada Top Albums/CDs (RPM)	25
Dutch Albums (Album Top 100)	41
Swedish Albums (Sverigetopplistan)	35
UK Albums (Official Charts)	32
US Billboard 200	21
US Top R&B/Hip-Hop Albums (Billboard)	41

=== Singles ===
Year	Single	Chart positions	
Year	Single	US	US R&B
1985	"A Nite At The Apollo Live!"	20	40
"—" denotes releases that did not chart
