= Did It in a Minute =

1982 single by Hall & Oates

- Side-A label of the US 7-inch vinyl single

Single by Hall & Oates

from the album Private Eyes
- B-side: "Head Above Water"
- Released: March 1982
- Recorded: 1981
- Studio: Electric Lady, New York City
- Genre: New wave
- Length: 3:37
- Label: RCA
- Songwriters: Daryl Hall, Sara Allen, Janna Allen
- Producers: Daryl Hall, John Oates

Hall & Oates singles chronology
"I Can't Go For That (No Can Do)" (1981)	"Did It in a Minute" (1982)	"Your Imagination" (1982)

Alternative cover
- Picture sleeve of German single

Music video
- "Did It in a Minute" on YouTube

"Did It in a Minute" is a song performed by American duo Hall & Oates. Written by Daryl Hall with Sara and Janna Allen, the song was released as the third of four singles from the duo's tenth studio album Private Eyes in March 1982. Daryl Hall performs lead vocals, while John Oates provides backing harmony vocals.

== Background ==
As Daryl Hall said in a 2015 interview, " I was in the car with Janna (Allen), and she said, "I got this idea for a chorus," and she sang that chorus. That's how it all started. And I said, "That's great." We got out of the car, I went to a keyboard, and I put the chords to it. I worked on a verse, and then Sara (Allen) and I sat and wrote the lyrics together for the verse. So it was sort of a three-way collaboration on that song."

The song was inspired by the 1977 Eric Carmen hit "She Did It", because of the 'did-its' in the song. Carmen was touring with Hall & Oates at the time "Did It in a Minute" became a hit. "She Did It" itself had been inspired by the 'did-its' in the Beach Boys' tune, "Do It Again".

Record World called it a "hook-filled pop piece."

== Chart performance ==
"Did It in a Minute" peaked at number nine on the United States Billboard Hot 100, becoming one of three top ten singles from Private Eyes.

=== Weekly charts ===
Chart (1982)	Peak position
Canadian Top Singles (RPM)	10
Canada Adult Contemporary (RPM)	4
US Billboard Hot 100	9
US Adult Contemporary (Billboard)	29
US Cash Box Top 100	10
US Radio & Records CHR/Pop Airplay Chart	3

=== Year-end charts ===
Chart (1982)	Rank
Canada Top Singles (RPM)	94
US Billboard Hot 100	66
US Cash Box	68

== Popular culture ==
- In an episode of SCTV Network that aired on 5 June 1982, this song was performed by the duo (with their band).
