= Hall & Oates =

American pop rock duo (1970–2022)

Daryl Hall & John Oates
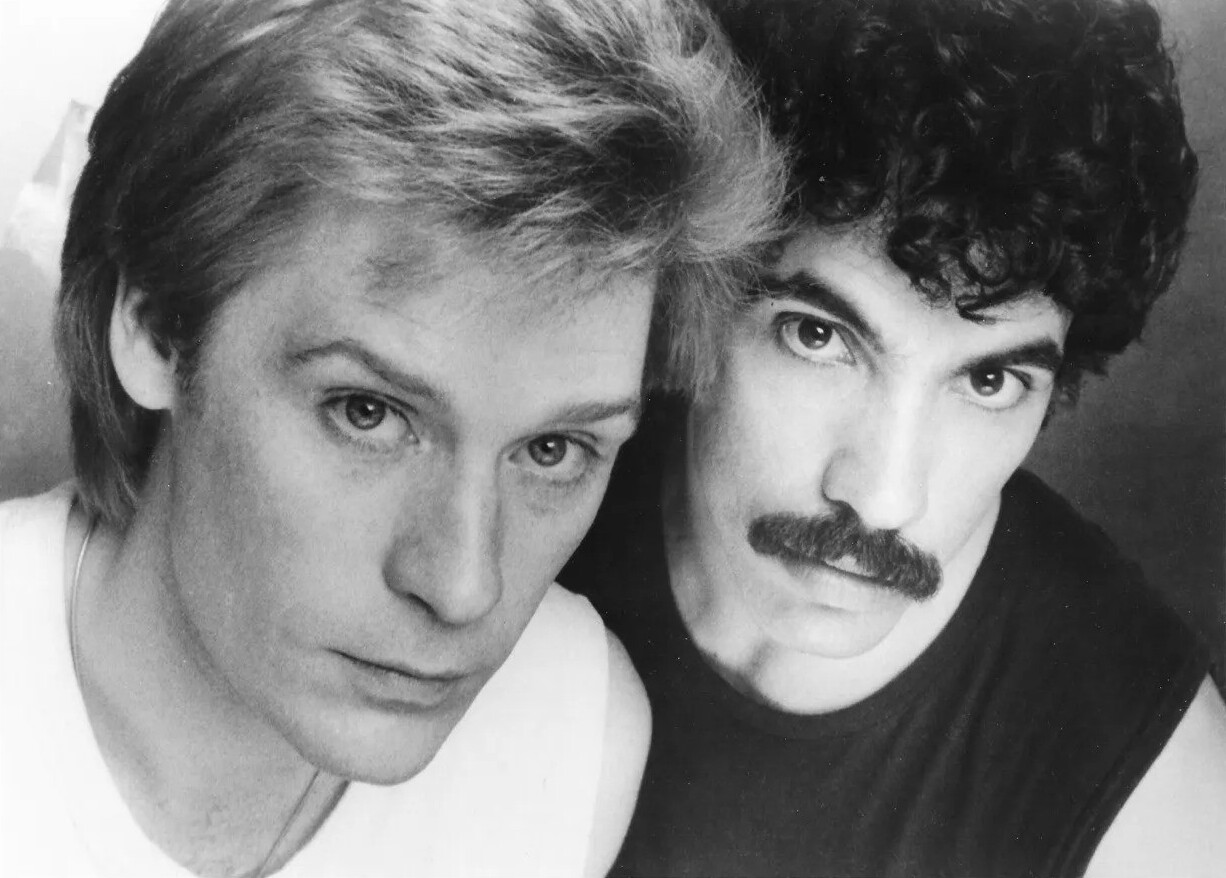
- Daryl Hall (left) and John Oates, c. 1980

Background information
- Also known as: Hall & Oates
- Origin: Philadelphia, Pennsylvania, U.S.
- Genres: Pop rock; blue-eyed soul; soft rock; R&B
- Years active: 1970–2022
- Labels: Atlantic; RCA Victor; Arista; U-Watch
- Past members: Daryl Hall; John Oates

Daryl Hall & John Oates, commonly known as Hall & Oates, were an American pop rock duo formed in Philadelphia, Pennsylvania, in 1970. Daryl Hall was generally the lead vocalist, while John Oates primarily supplied electric guitar and backing vocals and occasional lead vocals. The two wrote most of the songs they performed, either separately or in collaboration. They achieved their greatest fame from the mid-1970s to the late 1980s with a fusion of rock music, soul music, and rhythm and blues.

Though they are commonly referred to by only their surnames, the duo's official and preferred title included the members' first names. They have been credited on albums as Daryl Hall & John Oates (or Daryl Hall John Oates) on all of their US releases. The duo reached the US Top 40 with 29 of their 33 singles charting on the Billboard Hot 100 between 1974 and 1991. Six of these peaked at number one: "Rich Girl" (1977), "Kiss on My List" (1980), the two 1981 releases "Private Eyes" and "I Can't Go for That (No Can Do)" (also a Hot Soul number 1), "Maneater" (1982), and "Out of Touch" (1984). Their overall 16 US Top Tens also include "She's Gone", "Sara Smile", "You Make My Dreams", "Family Man", "Say It Isn't So", and "Method of Modern Love". Seven of their albums have been RIAA-certified platinum and six of them gold. In the United Kingdom, they have achieved success with two Top Ten albums and six Top 40 singles, two of which – "I Can't Go for That (No Can Do)" and "Maneater" – reached the Top Ten. The duo have spent 120 weeks in the UK Top 75 albums chart and 84 weeks in the UK Top 75 singles chart.

While the duo had employed a wide variety of session musicians on their recordings, several in particular appear on many of their works and have toured with them, including guitarist G. E. Smith, bassist Tom "T-Bone" Wolk, drummer Mickey Curry and multi-instrumentalist Charles DeChant. In addition, they collaborated with sisters Sara Allen and Janna Allen on songwriting and composing.

In 2003, Hall & Oates were inducted into the Songwriters Hall of Fame. In August 2018, in a 60th-anniversary celebration of the Billboard Hot 100, the duo ranked 18 in a list of the top Hot 100 artists of all time and six in a list of the Hot 100's top duos/groups. They remain the most successful duo of all time, ahead of the Carpenters, the Everly Brothers, and Simon & Garfunkel. In September 2010, VH1 ranked the duo 99th among the 100 greatest artists of all time. In April 2014, they were inducted into the Rock and Roll Hall of Fame, and on September 2, 2016, they received a star on the Hollywood Walk of Fame. In April 2024, Oates indicated that the duo would no longer perform together amidst a legal battle between them.

== History ==
=== 1967–1972: Formation and early years ===
Daryl Franklin Hohl (born in Pottstown, Pennsylvania, on October 11, 1946) and John William Oates (born in New York City on April 7, 1948) first met at the Adelphi Ballroom in Philadelphia in 1967. Each was heading his own musical group, Hall with The Temptones and Oates with The Masters. They were attending a band competition, when they discovered that they were interested in the same music and both were attending Temple University. They started spending time together and eventually shared a number of apartments in the city. One of the apartments they shared had "Hall & Oates" on the mailbox, which became the duo's common nickname. It took them another two years to form a musical duo, and three years after that, they signed to Atlantic Records and released their debut album. The two did not start working together seriously until 1970 after Oates returned from an extended stay in Europe.

=== 1972–1974: First albums ===
Early in their recording careers, Hall & Oates had trouble clearly defining their sound, alternating among folk, soul, rock and pop. None of their early albums—Whole Oats, Abandoned Luncheonette, and War Babies—were very successful on initial release. Despite being produced by such big-name producers as Arif Mardin and Todd Rundgren, they had no hit singles. But after "She's Gone" off Abandoned Luncheonette was covered by Lou Rawls and Tavares, the latter version reached Number One on the R&B chart in 1974. Written for Hall's first wife, Bryna Lublin (Hall), the song was inspired by Oates being stood up on a date on New Year's Eve. Another Abandoned Luncheonette single, "Las Vegas Turnaround", was written about (and mentioned by first name) Hall's girlfriend, flight attendant and future song-writing collaborator Sara Allen.

=== 1975–1977: First hits ===
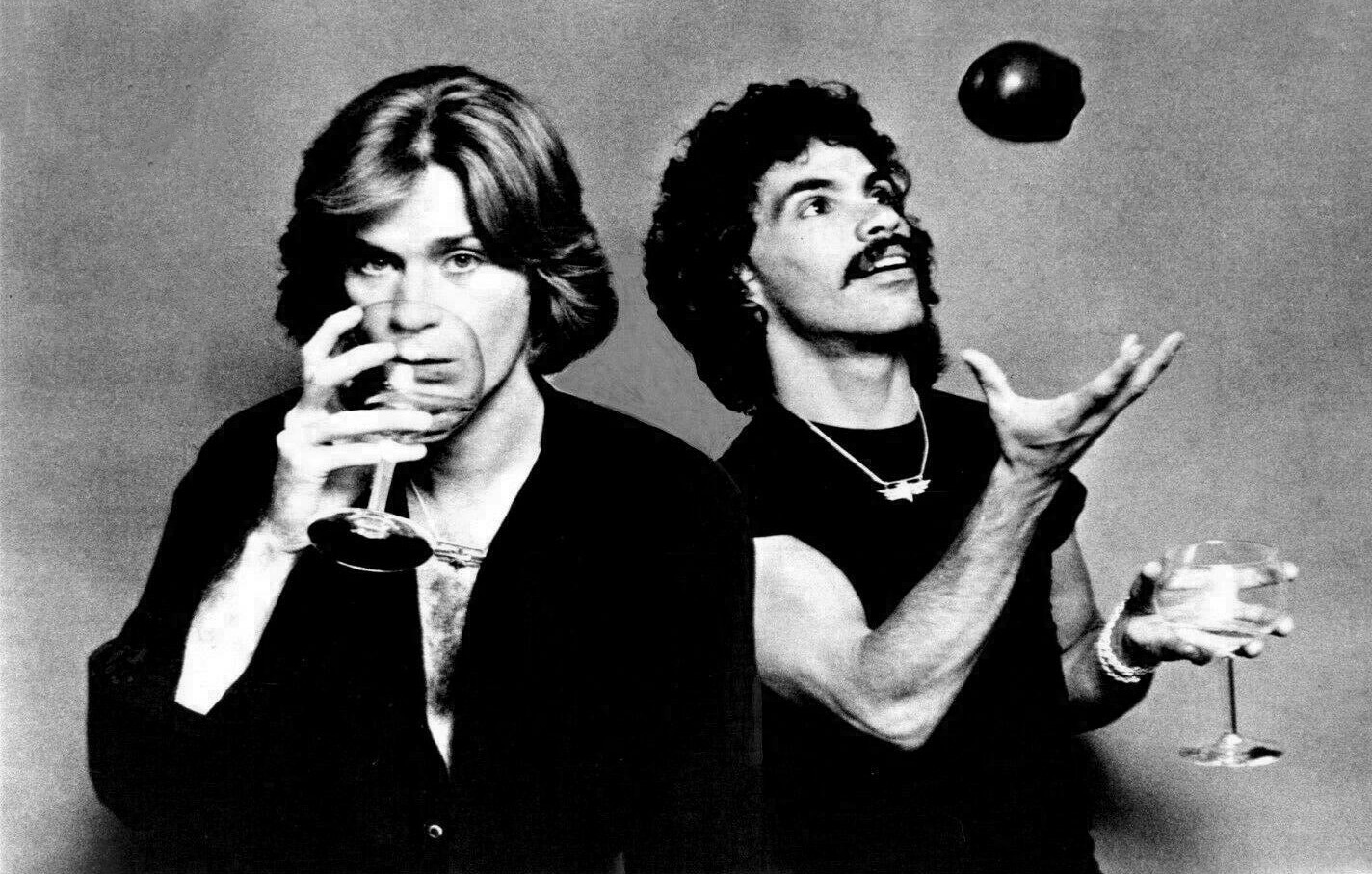
Hall & Oates in a promo photo for their album Bigger Than Both of Us, 1976

After the release of War Babies in 1974, Hall & Oates left Atlantic Records to join RCA Records. Their first album for RCA, Daryl Hall & John Oates (often referred to by their fans as the silver album because of the silver foil material on the original album cover), was issued in 1975 and was their first notable success. The album contained the ballad "Sara Smile", a song Hall wrote for Allen. The album cover depicted Hall & Oates, overly made up with cosmetic blush to the point where they looked feminine, especially the long-haired and clean-shaven Hall. Hall later said in an interview for VH1's Behind the Music that he looked like "the girl I always wanted to go out with" on the album cover. This cover was designed by Pierre LaRoche, who created the cover for Ziggy Stardust for David Bowie.

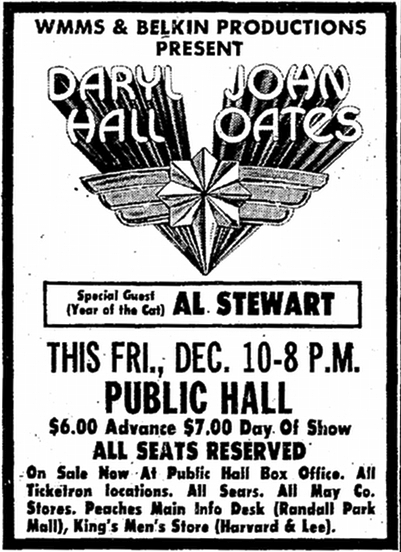
Print advertisement in The Plain Dealer for Hall & Oates performance at Cleveland Public Hall on December 10, 1976, sponsored by Belkin Productions and WMMS

"Sara Smile" became Hall & Oates' first Top 10 hit, reaching number 4 on the Billboard Hot 100 chart in June 1976. Atlantic subsequently re-released "She's Gone", which reached number 7 in October 1976, and Abandoned Luncheonette, which reached number 33 on the albums chart on November 20, 1976, and staying on for 38 weeks.

Hall & Oates followed those hits with the more pop-oriented album Bigger Than Both of Us later that year. Although the album's first single—the Philadelphia soul–oriented ballad "Do What You Want, Be What You Are"—barely made the Top 40, their second single, "Rich Girl", was a smash. The song was Hall & Oates's first number 1 hit, reaching the top spot for the week ending March 26, 1977.

=== 1977–1978: Leaner years and Sacred Songs ===
After this small run of hits, Hall & Oates still encountered difficulty getting radio play. Despite touring constantly and recording albums with efficiency, the duo could not find any pop success for a number of reasons, mainly because of the popularity of the disco genre. By the time they released the rock-oriented albums Beauty on a Back Street in 1977 and Along the Red Ledge in 1978, disco music was trendy and taking most of the spots in popular music.

They did release a few hit singles during this period: the follow-up to "Rich Girl," "Back Together Again," hit the Top 40, and "It's a Laugh" (from Along the Red Ledge) hit the top 20 in 1978. In 1977, RCA attempted to push Hall to the fore with his first solo effort Sacred Songs. However, after being presented with the highly experimental recording, produced by Robert Fripp of King Crimson, RCA became unwilling to release what was, in their view, a non-commercial album. Sacred Songs was eventually released in 1980.

=== 1979–1981: X-Static and Voices ===
In late 1979, Hall & Oates released X-Static – produced by David Foster, which combined rock with disco. The album did not fare well, although "Wait for Me" did hit the top 20. The 1980s brought changes for Hall & Oates. The pair felt that the biggest hindrance to their success was that their music was being filtered through outside producers, and that studio musicians were not familiar with their own tastes and thoughts. In 1979, they hired G. E. Smith (who had worked with Dan Hartman and David Bowie) as lead guitarist, Mickey Curry as drummer, and Tom "T-Bone" Wolk joined as bassist in 1981. They also enlisted Hall's girlfriend Sara Allen (and her younger sister Janna) to help write songs, and began working with Neil Kernon, an engineer on Voices who worked as co-producer on their succeeding two albums.

The band also wished to capture the sound of New York City which, by then, had become their home. As a result, instead of recording in Los Angeles, as they had done previously, they decided to record at Electric Lady Studios in New York City, just five minutes away from their apartments, and began producing their own recordings with their touring band backing them in the studio.

The resulting album, Voices, was written, produced and arranged by Hall & Oates in one month, according to their authorized biography Dangerous Dances (by Nick Tosches). The first two singles from the album charted fairly well, with "How Does It Feel to Be Back" charting at Number 30. The well-received cover of The Righteous Brothers' "You've Lost That Lovin' Feelin'", just missed the Top 10, peaking at Number 12, but spent 14 weeks in the Top 40. After the release of that song, Oates's contribution as the lead vocalist diminished on future releases. The third single "Kiss on My List" hit Number 1 in April 1981 and remained there for three weeks. The follow-up single "You Make My Dreams" reached Number 5 in July of that year.

The other well-known song from Voices is the emotive ballad "Everytime You Go Away", with powerful lead vocals by Hall, who wrote it. British singer Paul Young had a Billboard Number 1 hit with a cover of the song in 1985. Though the Hall & Oates original (recorded in a Memphis-soul style) was never released as a single, it remains a fan favorite on the duo's greatest hits albums, and was featured on their Apollo Theater album in 1985.

=== 1981–1982: Private Eyes ===
By the time "You Make My Dreams" was falling off the charts, Hall & Oates had already released their follow-up album Private Eyes. Having worked in the studio while Voices was at its peak in popularity, the two had already recorded most of their material and perfected a fusion of their doo-wop and soul roots with New Wave energy and hard rock grit. The result was a pop classic that is often considered one of the greatest albums of the 1980s, and was the first Hall & Oates album to reach the Top 10 on the Billboard 200 album chart, while four singles from Private Eyes all reached the Top 40.

The title track and "I Can't Go for That (No Can Do)" were both Number 1 hits, separated only by the ten-week stay at Number 1 by "Physical" by Olivia Newton-John. "I Can't Go for That (No Can Do)" was one of the few songs ever recorded by a white act to reach Number One on both the R&B and the pop charts. "Did It in a Minute" reached Number 9 in the spring of 1982, and "Your Imagination" peaked at number 33.

=== 1982–1983: H_{2}O and band changes ===
Their next album, H_{2}O, a very polished, synth-heavy effort, became the duo's most successful album, with US sales eventually approaching four million copies. H_{2}O reached number 3 on the Billboard charts (where it held for 15 weeks) and spawned three Top 10 singles. "Maneater", the biggest hit of their career, reached number 1 on December 18, 1982, and stayed there for four weeks.

The soulful ballad "One on One" and a cover of Mike Oldfield's "Family Man" reached number 7 and number 6 in March and June 1983, respectively.

We try and take chances. Our new single "Maneater" isn't something that sounds like anything else on the radio. The idea is to make things better. Daryl Hall – NME – November 1982

According to Oates, they recorded approximately twenty songs for the album, of which nine did not make the final cut. He went on to say they usually had five or six tracks left over per album.

For the H_{2}O album, Hall & Oates made some permanent changes to their current band. Drummer Mickey Curry, who had appeared on some Private Eyes tracks, including the title song, replaced Jerry Marotta full-time. Bassist Tom Wolk, who had mimed John Siegler's bass line in the "Private Eyes" video, replaced Siegler full-time. These two joined the band's holdovers—lead guitar player G.E. Smith, and saxophonist Charles DeChant. Wolk continued to perform with the duo until his death in early 2010, while Curry returned for the Do It for Love and Laughing Down Crying sessions.

=== 1983–1984: Rock 'n Soul Part 1 ===
By the fall of 1983, Hall & Oates were one of the biggest pop music acts in the United States. They had five Number 1 singles to their credit, two consecutive Top 10 albums and were one of the biggest names on MTV. Two covers of the 1957 Bobby Helms classic "Jingle Bell Rock" were recorded—one with Hall on lead vocals, and the other with Oates on lead vocals—and released in time for Christmas 1983, complete with a humorous video of the band, that received extensive airplay on MTV. In 1983, they released their first greatest hits album entitled Rock 'n Soul Part 1. The album peaked at Number 7, and the two new songs that were written and recorded for that LP also became Top 10 hits as well.

The first single released from this album, "Say It Isn't So", battled six weeks for the Number 1 spot with Paul McCartney and Michael Jackson's "Say Say Say" at the peak of Thriller mania. "Say It Isn't So" remained at number 2 for four weeks from December 10 through 31, 1983.

Hall & Oates' follow-up single "Adult Education" received heavy airplay at both pop and black (urban contemporary) radio, and reached Number 8 on the Billboard Hot 100 in April 1984. It was accompanied by a dark, New York City–oriented music video set in a cave. Oates later told VH1 that the clip resembled the Survivor TV show on acid.

=== 1984–1985: Big Bam Boom ===
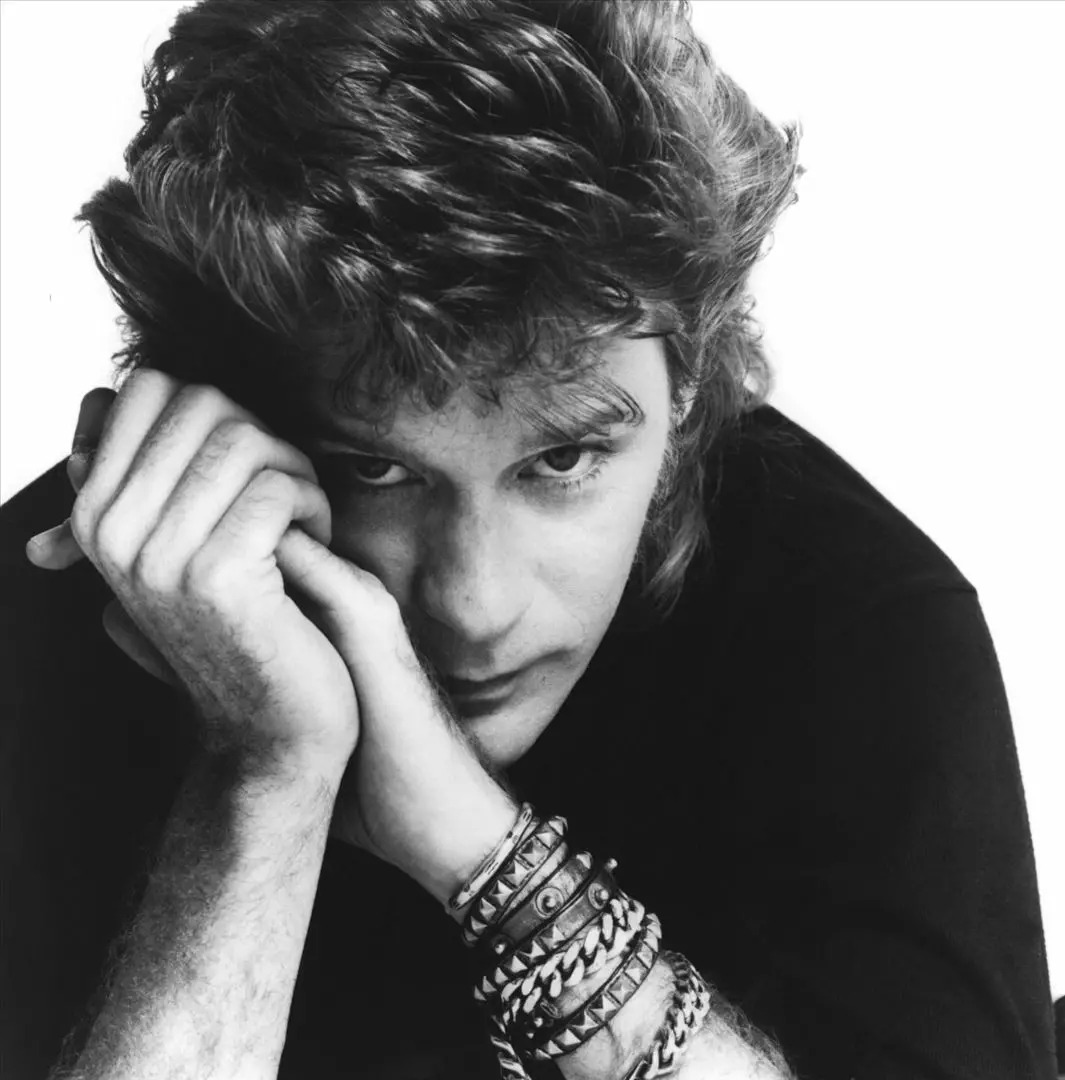
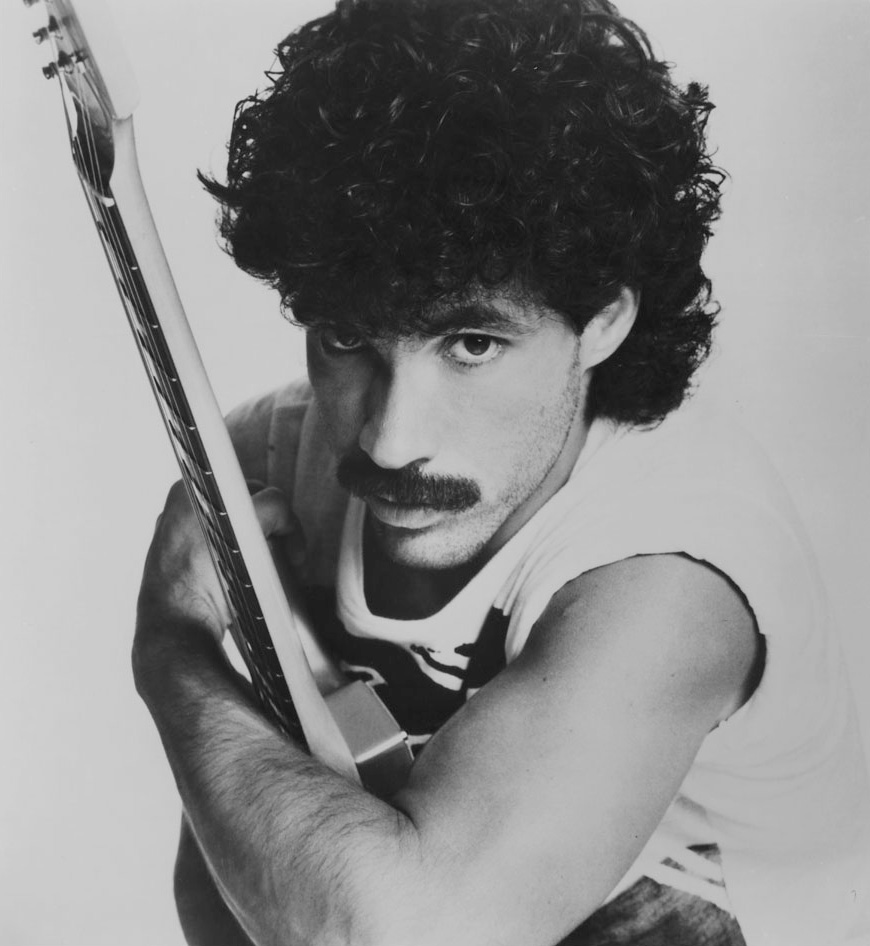
Daryl Hall (left) and John Oates (right) in 1984

Hall & Oates returned to the studio in 1984 after a rest period to begin work on the Big Bam Boom album. This album had even more of an electronic, urban feel to it than H_{2}O, combining their song structure and vocalization with the latest technical advances in recording and playing. The album employed some of the most sophisticated equipment ever used in the recording industry at the time (most notably the Synclavier II, one of the first computerized synthesizer workstations, as well as the Fairlight CMI). Noted remix and hip-hop icon Arthur Baker worked very closely with the duo as a consultant, and produced dance remixes of four of the album's singles.

Released in late 1984, the first single from the LP, "Out of Touch", became the group's sixth number 1 hit on December 8, 1984. "Method of Modern Love", which debuted on the pop charts while "Out of Touch" was at number 1, reached number 5 in February 1985. "Some Things Are Better Left Unsaid" reached number 18, and "Possession Obsession" (a song in which Oates sings lead) reached number 30 in 1985 as well. The group's "Live Thru '85" tour to promote the album began in November 1984, sponsored by Pontiac's latest sports car, the Fiero. In addition, Pontiac allowed Oates, a skilled amateur racer, to drive in Pontiac's factory IMSA GTU race car in Camel GT pro races. In April 1984, the Recording Industry Association of America named Hall & Oates the most successful duo in rock history.

=== 1985–1988: Live at the Apollo and other projects ===
Hall & Oates almost always toured extensively for each album release. But in 1985, the duo took a break after the release of their Live at the Apollo album with David Ruffin and Eddie Kendricks—voices of The Temptations and two of their heroes. This was RCA's second attempt at a live Hall & Oates album, following the 1978 release Livetime. Live at the Apollo was released primarily to fulfill the duo's contract with RCA, and contained a Top 20 Grammy-nominated hit with a medley of "The Way You Do the Things You Do" and "My Girl"; Ruffin and Kendrick had originally recorded both songs with the Temptations in 1964.

Hall & Oates both appeared on the USA for Africa "We Are the World" project, with the former as one of the soloists and the latter as a chorus member, and performed at the Live Aid concert in Philadelphia, with Ruffin and Kendrick. The Hall & Oates band also backed up Mick Jagger's performance at this show.

Hall, Oates, Ruffin and Kendrick performed again at the MTV Video Music Awards in New York later that year, complete with an Apollo Theater-style marquee descending on the stage during their performance.

In May 1985, Hall & Oates performed at the Nashville Municipal Auditorium. Just prior to Live Aid, on July 4, they participated in Liberty Concert, an outdoor benefit concert at Liberty State Park in Jersey City, New Jersey for the restoration of the Statue of Liberty, which was filmed for HBO. It became a major music event, drawing an estimated crowd of over 60,000 people.

In 1986, Hall scored a Top 5 US hit with "Dreamtime", from his solo album Three Hearts in the Happy Ending Machine. That album also included the Top 40 hit "Foolish Pride" and the Top 100 hit "Someone Like You", later performed by the duo live on their "Behind the Music" set. Although Oates did not have a solo hit as a singer, he did contribute a solo track to the film About Last Night and co-wrote (with Iva Davies) and performed backing vocals on the 1987 Icehouse top 10 US hit "Electric Blue". Oates also worked as producer, co-songwriter and co-lead vocalist of the single "Love Is Fire" by The Parachute Club, which was a top 40 hit in Canada in 1987.

=== 1988–1990: Arista years ===
Hall & Oates signed with Arista Records, their third record company, in 1987, shortly before the string of Top 10 hits ended, in Tommy Mottola's effort to keep them under contract when their RCA obligation ran out. Their first album for the label, Ooh Yeah!, included the hits "Everything Your Heart Desires" (Number 3 in May 1988—their last to make the Top 10), "Missed Opportunity", and "Downtown Life". Beginning with Ooh Yeah!, album and single releases were credited as Daryl Hall John Oates, with the '&' or 'and' missing between the duo's names. It was the last Hall & Oates album, other than greatest hits packages, to enjoy platinum success. They recorded one more album for Arista called Change of Season. The album's first single "So Close" (co-produced by Jon Bon Jovi) reached Number 11 and was Hall & Oates's last major hit.

Another song from the album, "Don't Hold Back Your Love", was named by SOCAN as the second-most performed song in Canada for 1992; it became a hit for Australian Sherbet front man, Daryl Braithwaite, in his solo years, and has become a Hall & Oates staple in concert. Change of Season was a more mainstream rock album than their previous work. Despite the fact that Ooh Yeah! and Change of Season reached platinum and gold status respectively, they were perceived as disappointments. In 1989, they covered and performed their own version of the O'Jays song "Love Train" for the film Earth Girls Are Easy.

In September of 1988, Hall & Oates joined the Grateful Dead for a rainforest benefit concert at Madison Square Garden, performing "Every Time You Go Away" and a cover of the Marvin Gaye song "What's Going On".

=== 1991–2006: Do It for Love and Christmas album ===
The duo's occasional song-writing collaborator Janna Allen died of leukemia in 1993. Hall & Oates released the Marigold Sky album in 1997 (their first all-new studio album in seven years), which included an Adult Contemporary hit "Promise Ain't Enough". They also released a "VH1 Behind the Music" Greatest Hits package shortly after appearing on the show in 2002. Hall & Oates released the Do It for Love album in 2003, whose title track was a number one Adult Contemporary hit. They also released the Hall & Oates Live DVD from an A&E Live by Request special. This album was the first release (and first success) for their newest joint venture U-Watch Records. Hall has also released the solo albums Soul Alone (1993) and Can't Stop Dreaming (originally released in Japan in 1996), and a live two-disc solo album titled Live in Philadelphia (2004).

Hall & Oates covered Elton John's "Philadelphia Freedom" on the 1991 John/Taupin tribute album "Two Rooms", saying in the booklet: "We chose 'Philadelphia Freedom' because the music is so close to our hearts, and the lyrics represent the way we feel about Philadelphia." Oates released his own solo album in 2002 entitled Phunk Shui and a companion live concert DVD. Hall & Oates also released their first CD of (mostly) covers, Our Kind of Soul, in 2004. It includes some of their favorite R&B songs, such as "I'll Be Around" (their first Hot 100 entry in over a decade), "Love T.K.O.", and Dan Hartman's "I Can Dream About You", among others. Hall & Oates remained on the touring circuit, traveling nearly as much as they did in years past. In addition, a DVD of live performances of the songs from Our Kind of Soul was released in November 2005.

Hall & Oates released a Christmas album, Home for Christmas, on October 3, 2006, which contained two Christmas originals and covers, including a version of "It Came Upon a Midnight Clear", which became their second number one Adult Contemporary hit.

=== 2007–2013: Solo projects and hiatus ===
In September 2007, representatives of Montreal-based band Chromeo stated in a press release, "Indeed, Chromeo's idols Hall and Oates have asked them to collaborate with them on their upcoming record! Needless to say, the gentlemen are giddy like schoolchildren to be given this opportunity", as reported by Pitchfork Media. This collaboration with Chromeo was expected to be released in late 2008/early 2009, and was released as Live from Daryl's House. On May 20, 2008, Hall & Oates were honored as BMI Icons at the 56th annual BMI Pop Awards. As of 2008, their song-writing has collected 24 BMI Pop Awards and 14 BMI Million-Air awards.

There were two notable nationally televised appearances for the duo in late 2008. On October 27, Oates sang the national anthem before Game 5 of the 2008 World Series at Citizens Bank Park in Philadelphia (Hall had taken sick, and the game was called on account of rain after the top of the 6th inning, but resumed on October 29, and the Phillies won, claiming their first World Series Championship in 28 years). (Though born in New York, Oates was raised in a suburb of Philadelphia and attended Temple University.)Then, on December 11, both Hall & Oates appeared on the year's last episode of The Daily Show with Jon Stewart. They sang a satirical tribute to Alan Colmes, as he was leaving the show Hannity & Colmes on Fox News a month later. On March 24, 2009, Hall & Oates performed together on the American television show Dancing with the Stars. During 2009, the duo recorded a cameo for the movie You Again, performing "Kiss On My List" for the final scene and closing credits.

On May 22 and 23, 2008, they performed at the Troubadour, 35 years after first performing there as an opening act. They played many popular selections, including "Cab Driver" from Hall's solo album as well as several songs from the Abandoned Luncheonette album, including "Had I Known You Better Then" which had never been performed live before. The performance was recorded as a concert film and later released in the US as a double CD set with DVD/Blu-ray Combo on November 25, 2008. In 2009 the live performances of "Sara Smile" from this album was nominated for a Grammy Award for Best Pop Performance by a Duo or Group with Vocals, an incredible 33 years after the original song was released. Concerning the nomination, Hall considered it truly a surprise. This made it the third time that the band was nominated for a Grammy Award; the other two times were in 1981 for "Private Eyes" and 1983 for "Maneater".

On October 13, 2009, a 4-CD box set was released, titled Do What You Want, Be What You Are: The Music of Daryl Hall and John Oates. This set represents the most comprehensive hits collection by the duo as it includes songs from various labels. Also included are three songs recorded by Hall & Oates with their earlier bands prior to their forming Hall & Oates as a duo. The boxed set sold 5,000 copies the first hour and, in total, it has sold 15,000 copies, according to Nielsen SoundScan, peaking at number 89 on the Billboard 200 on October 23, 2009. In one of the last concerts at the Wachovia Spectrum, Hall & Oates and Philadelphia-area musicians The Hooters and Todd Rundgren headlined a concert titled "Last Call". In 2010, Hall & Oates embarked on their "Do What You Want, Be What You Are" tour in the United States. They appeared on the American Idol season finale on May 26, 2010, performing "You Make My Dreams". Also in 2010, Hall & Oates announced they would join a growing artists' boycott of the state of Arizona over the state's recently passed anti-illegal immigrant laws.

On May 8, 2012, the two performed on the NBC reality singing competition The Voice.

=== 2013–2023: Hall of Fame induction and aborted 19th album ===
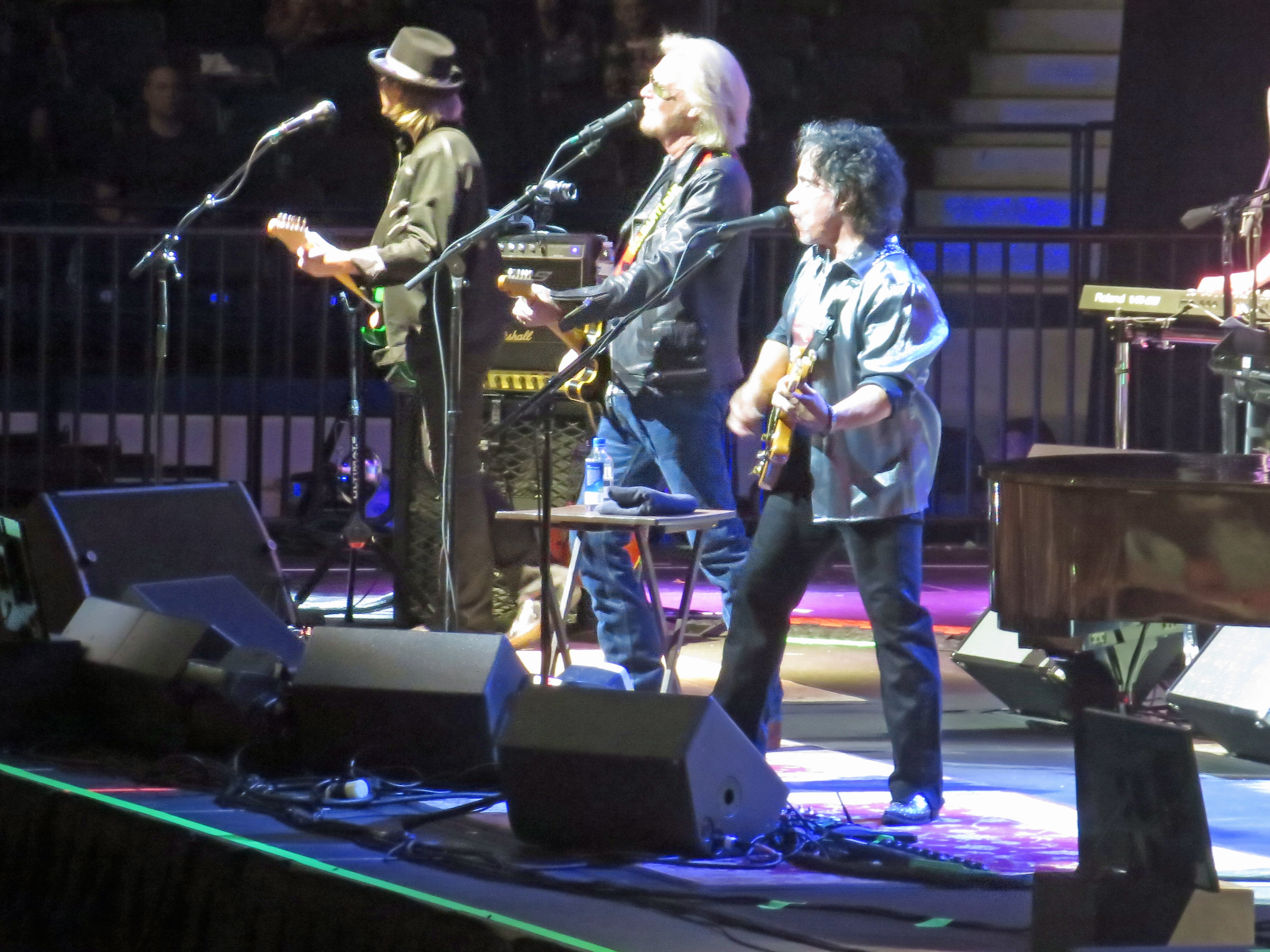
Hall & Oates performing at the Allstate Arena in Rosemont, Illinois in 2017

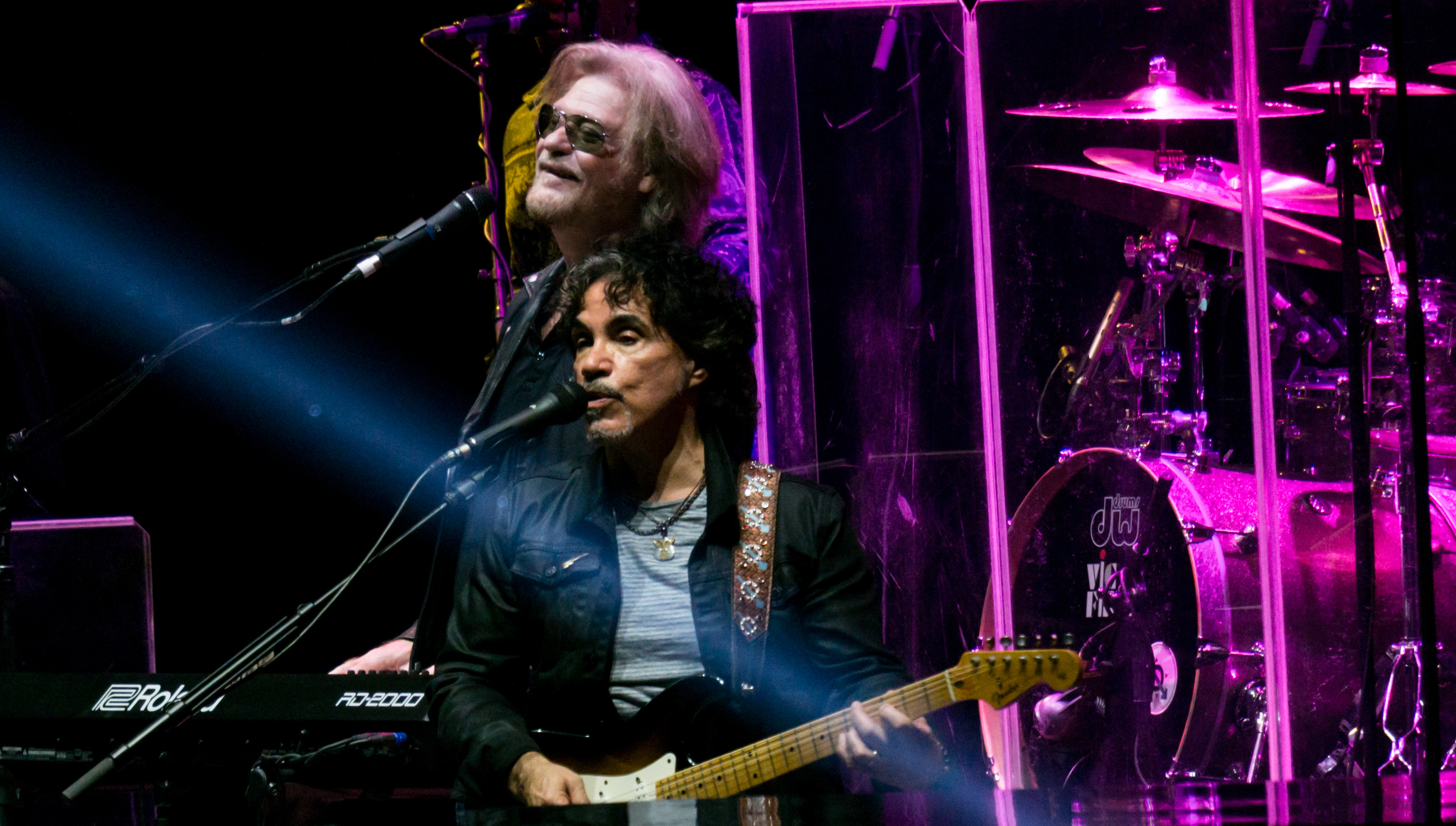
Hall & Oates performing at the O2 in London, 2017

On October 16, 2013, Hall & Oates were announced as 2014 nominees for the Rock and Roll Hall of Fame. They were announced as inductees for the Rock and Roll Hall of Fame's Class of 2014 on December 16, 2013.

Hall started his monthly web series Live from Daryl's House in 2007 after having the idea of "playing with my friends and putting it up on the Internet". The series features him jamming with various guest musicians in his house in the woods. Guest artists on the show have run the gamut of musical styles and influences, including artists such as Smokey Robinson, Robby Krieger from The Doors, Rumer, Nick Lowe, CeeLo Green, KT Tunstall, Todd Rundgren, Darius Rucker, and Chromeo. In 2010, Live From Daryl's House won a Webby Award in the Variety category.

In May 2014, Hall's home renovation program, Daryl's Restoration Over-Hall, premiered on the DIY Network. On July 15, 2014, Hall & Oates performed in Ireland as a duo for the very first time (they each performed independently as solo acts before) at the Olympia Theatre, Dublin. The event was recorded, packaged as a two CD/DVD set and released as Live in Dublin in Germany March 27, 2015, and in the US on March 30, 2015. Hall & Oates indicated that the recorded concert was also being released in movie theaters nationwide for one day only.

The duo made a cameo in the 2015 Happy Madison film Pixels. On September 2, 2016, Hall & Oates received a star on the Hollywood Walk of Fame for their work in the music industry, located at 6752 Hollywood Boulevard.

In March 2017, it was announced that they would be touring the US from May to July 2017. The 29-date arena tour was with co-headliner Tears for Fears. This included the HoagieNation festival in Philadelphia, created by Hall & Oates. A "celebration of everything Philly", the event was held again in 2018 and 2021. Hall & Oates also headlined the BluesFest 2017 at the London O2 arena on October 28, 2017, supported by Chris Isaak. They played a Dublin concert the following night.

Between May and June 2019 they made their first tour of Latin America, visiting Argentina, Chile and Brazil. Later they performed for the first time in Spain.

In January 2020, Hall said that he was working on songs for the duo's next album. However, in a 2021 interview, Hall said that while progress initially was not affected by the COVID-19 pandemic, work eventually stalled as he did not want to release anything that would become "irrelevant". By the time of the interview, he was uncertain about the prospect of a new album, stating that "things have changed". When asked by the Los Angeles Times about the possibility of a new album in a March 2022 interview, Hall was still uncertain, simply stating "time will tell".

On April 17, 2023, longtime keyboardist Eliot Lewis took to social media to announce that he would be departing the Hall & Oates band, Daryl Hall solo band, and the Live from Daryl's House band to "focus on [his] own music."

Hall & Oates were inducted into the National Rhythm & Blues Hall of Fame Class of 2023.

=== 2023–2024: Lawsuit and split ===
In November 2023, Hall filed a contract lawsuit under seal to prevent Oates from selling the pair's publishing rights, held by the pair's Whole Oats Enterprises, to Primary Wave Music without consulting Hall. Hall received a restraining order from the court to prevent the sale until the pair had attempted to arbitrate the matter between themselves.

In April 2024, Oates said in an interview with Rolling Stone that he had "moved on" from Hall & Oates and that the duo would never perform together again, with Hall confirming the same a month later in an interview with Variety.

On August 11, 2025, it was reported that the duo settled in arbitration and had filed to dismiss the case, though without details as to when the settlement was reached.

== Artistry ==
=== Musical style ===
Hall & Oates has been described as blue-eyed soul, Philadelphia soul, pop rock, power pop, soft rock, R&B and yacht rock, while their 1980s work has been characterized as new wave.

=== Songwriting ===
In an interview in a 1983 issue of Juke Magazine, Oates was asked about whether conflicts arose. He replied that "we have our creative differences but we reconcile them." He said that if they both came up with a different way of doing something, they'd try it both ways and whatever sounded the better of the two they would use.

In a September 2022 interview for Club Random with Bill Maher, Hall referred to Oates solely as his business partner, not his creative partner, and then listed some Hall & Oates songs he actually recorded solo.

== Name ==
The duo publicly despises being called "Hall & Oates". In an interview with Esquire, Oates said, "There isn't one album that says Hall and Oates. It's always Daryl Hall and John Oates, from the very beginning. People never note that. The idea of 'Hall and Oates', this two-headed monster, this thing, is not anything we've ever wanted or liked." In a 2015 interview, Oates said that "it's a horrible name" and that "it was a totally conscious decision" not to be known as "Hall & Oates". "We didn't want to be the Everly Brothers, or Loggins & Messina, or whatever."

In a 2017 interview with The Mercury News, Hall stated that "the reason we've always insisted on our full names is because we consider ourselves to be two individual artists. We're not really a classic duo in that respect." Despite their stated dislike for the name Hall & Oates, the group sued a Brooklyn-based granola company in 2015 for naming one of their products "Haulin' Oats", claiming it was a "well-known mark" of the group.

== Members ==
=== Musical duo ===
- Daryl Hall – vocals, keyboards, synthesizers, mandolin, guitars, vibraphone
- John Oates – vocals, guitars, keyboards

=== Backing musicians ===
- Johnny Ripp – guitars (1972)
- Mike McCarthy – bass (1972)
- Jim Helmer – drums, percussion (1972)
- Bill Keith – pedal steel (1972; died 2015)
- Neal Rosengarden – mellotron, saxophone (1972)
- Paul Ians – guitars (1973)
- Brad Fiedel – synthesizers, mellotron (1973–1975)
- Kenny Aaronson – bass (1973–1974)
- Willie Wilcox – drums (1973–1974)
- Don York – synthesizers, mellotron (1974)
- Steve Gelfand – bass (1974)
- Richie Cerniglia – guitars (1974–1975)
- Eddie Zyne – drums (1974–1977)
- David Kent – keyboards, synthesizers (1975–1978)
- Todd Sharp – guitars, backing vocals (1975–1977)
- Stephen Dees – bass, backing vocals (1975–1977)
- Charles DeChant – saxophone, keyboards, synthesizers, percussion, lyricon, flute, backing vocals (1976–1985, 1986, 1990–2022)
- Caleb Quaye – guitars (1977–1978)
- Kenny Passarelli – bass (1977–1978, 1980)
- Roger Pope – drums (1977–1978)
- G. E. Smith – lead guitars, keyboards, backing vocals (1979–1980, 1981–1985, 1986)
- Jerry Marotta – drums (1979–1980)
- John Siegler – bass (1979–1980, 1981)
- Chuck Burgi – drums (1980–1981)
- Jeff Southworth – guitars (1980–1981)
- Larry Fast – synthesizers, programming (off-stage: 1981–1982)
- Tom "T-Bone" Wolk – bass, accordion, keyboards, guitar, mandolin, harmonica, backing vocals, musical director (1981–1985, 1986, 1988–1989, 1990–2010; his death)
- Mickey Curry – drums (1981–1985, 1986)
- Mike Klvana – synthesizers, programming (off-stage: 1982–1985; on-stage: 1988–1989)
- Wells Christy – synthesizers, synclavier (1984–85)
- Robbie Kilgore – keyboards (1985)
- Jimmy Maelen – percussion (1985; died 1988)
- Lenny Pickett – tenor saxophone (1985)
- Steve Elson – baritone saxophone (1985) (only on Live at the Apollo)
- Mac Gollehon – trumpet (1985)
- "Hollywood" Paul Litteral – trumpet (1985) (only on Live at the Apollo)
- Ray Anderson – trombone (1985) (only on Live at the Apollo)
- Keith O'Quinn – trombone (1985)
- Tony Beard – drums (1988; died 2025)
- Pat Buchanan – guitars (1988)
- Bob Mayo – keyboards, synthesizers, organ, guitars, backing vocals (1988–1992, 1997–1998; died 2004)
- Mark Rivera – saxophone, percussion, synthesizers, backing vocals (1988–1989)
- Mike Braun – drums, percussion (December 1988 – September 2010)
- Larry Tagg – bass, backing vocals (1990)
- Jimmy Rip – guitars (1990)
- Kasim Sulton – bass, backing vocals (1991–1992)
- Lisa Haney – cello (1991–1992)
- Eileen Ivers – violin (1991–1992)
- Jeff Levine – keyboards (1995, 1999–2001)
- Paul Pesco – guitar (1997–2001, 2010–2013)
- Jeff Catania – guitars (2001–2006)
- John Korba – keyboards, guitar, backing vocals (2002–2003)
- Eliot Lewis – keyboards, backing vocals (2003–2022)
- Zev Katz – bass (2006–2011)
- Everett Bradley – percussion, backing vocals (2006, 2007–2011)
- Brian Dunne – drums (2010–2022)
- Klyde Jones – bass, backing vocals (2011–2022)
- Porter Carroll – percussion, backing vocals (2011–2022)
- Shane Theriot – guitars, backing vocals (2013–2022)

== Discography ==
- Whole Oats (1972)
- Abandoned Luncheonette (1973)
- War Babies (1974)
- Daryl Hall & John Oates (1975)
- Bigger Than Both of Us (1976)
- Beauty on a Back Street (1977)
- Along the Red Ledge (1978)
- X-Static (1979)
- Voices (1980)
- Private Eyes (1981)
- H_{2}O (1982)
- Big Bam Boom (1984)
- Ooh Yeah! (1988)
- Change of Season (1990)
- Marigold Sky (1997)
- Do It for Love (2003)
- Our Kind of Soul (2004)
- Home for Christmas (2006)

== See also ==
- List of artists who reached number one in the United States
- List of artists who reached number one on the U.S. dance chart
- List of Billboard number-one dance hits
- List of Billboard number-one singles
