= Method of Modern Love =

1984 single by Daryl Hall & John Oates

Single by Daryl Hall & John Oates

from the album Big Bam Boom
- B-side: "Bank on Your Love"
- Released: December 1984
- Recorded: 1984
- Studio: Electric Lady, New York City
- Genre: Soft rock
- Length: 5:34 (album version); 3:58 (single version); 7:49 (extended mix)
- Label: RCA Victor
- Songwriters: Daryl Hall, Janna Allen
- Producers: Daryl Hall, John Oates and Bob Clearmountain

Daryl Hall & John Oates singles chronology
"Out of Touch" (1984)	"Method of Modern Love" (1984)	"Some Things Are Better Left Unsaid" (1985)

Music video
- "Method of Modern Love" on YouTube

"Method of Modern Love" is a song by the American duo Daryl Hall & John Oates. It was released as the second single from their 1984 album, Big Bam Boom. The song reached number five on the Billboard Hot 100 in February 1985.

Billboard said that Hall & Oates "pop-r&b style renews its freshness and interest."

== Music video ==
The setting and the mood of the music video are surreal, almost dream-like. At the beginning, Hall and Oates are discovered in their cozy apartment by someone on the roof looking through a skylight. G. E. Smith throws a V-style guitar through the window, as if it were a spear. The guitar sticks into the floor and begins to glow. This incites Hall and Oates to go up to the roof to investigate. There, they become mesmerized by a four-man band, and then all the men perform a choreography. While performing, Hall falls from the roof, and the other men rush to see what became of him. They see him dancing on the clouds next to the moon, and upon Hall's beckoning, they dive off the roof in an attempt to walk on the clouds. At the end, they swim and dance in the clouds with neon signs flashing the letters of the song title.

The version of the song used in the video is a special edit, which incorporates both the album version and the 12" remix version.

== Chart performance ==
The song entered the Billboard Hot 100 when "Out of Touch" was still on the top of the chart; it debuted at #50 for the week ending December 15. After eight weeks it peaked at #5 staying there for a week; the single remained on the chart for 19 weeks. Curiously, on the January 19, 1985, issue, the song was at #21 while Out of Touch was at #22.

The song debuted at #38 on the December 14, 1984, issue of the Radio & Records airplay chart; after four weeks it peaked at #5, staying there for two weeks. The song was on the top 10 of the chart for five weeks and remained on the chart for 10 weeks.

== Chart positions ==
Chart (1984–1985)	Peak position
Canadian RPM Singles Chart	7
Canadian The Record Singles Chart	6
Ireland (IRMA)	27
UK Singles (Official Charts)	21
US Billboard Hot 100	5
US Radio & Records CHR/Pop Airplay Chart	5
US Adult Contemporary (Billboard)	18
US Hot R&B/Hip-Hop Songs (Billboard)	21
US Dance Club Songs (Billboard)	15
US Mainstream Rock (Billboard)	42
West Germany (GfK)	45

Year-end chart (1985)	Rank
US Top Pop Singles (Billboard)	83

== In popular culture ==
- In 1985, "Weird Al" Yankovic included the song in his polka medley "Hooked on Polkas" from his album Dare to Be Stupid.
- In 1993, rapper Method Man interpolated the hook on the song "Method Man".
