= You Make My Dreams =

1981 single by Hall & Oates

- Original US single

Single by Daryl Hall & John Oates

from the album Voices
- B-side: "Gotta Lotta Nerve (Perfect Perfect)"
- Released: April 1981
- Recorded: 1980
- Genre: Rock; soul; new wave; pop
- Length: 3:10
- Label: RCA Victor
- Songwriters: Daryl Hall; John Oates; Sara Allen
- Producers: Daryl Hall; John Oates

Daryl Hall & John Oates singles chronology
"Kiss on My List" (1980)	"You Make My Dreams" (1981)	"Private Eyes" (1981)

Music video
- "You Make My Dreams" on YouTube

"You Make My Dreams" is a song by American duo Daryl Hall & John Oates, taken from their ninth studio album, Voices (1980). The song reached number five on the Billboard Hot 100 chart in 1981. The track received 154,000 digital sales between 2008 and 2009 according to Nielsen SoundScan.

The song has sold over 1.8 million copies in the UK as of June 2024, despite having never charted in the country.

== Composition ==
John Oates said the song came about "through a happy accident. A guitar player friend of mine and myself were jamming in the dressing room, and I started playing a Delta blues and he started playing a Texas swing, and we put them together, and all of a sudden into my head popped "you make my dreams." I just started singing it. I don't know why, but I did. And it sounded really cool and everyone liked it. It was as simple as that."

Daryl Hall also commented on the iconic piano riff that opens the song and the distinctive sound that is generated by a Yamaha CP-30 in an interview with the BBC on the 40th anniversary of the song’s release. "It's a very unusual edition of a Yamaha called the Yamaha CP-30. There were very few of them made and it wasn't out for very long. Over the years mine got destroyed [and] I cannot duplicate that sound other than with the actual instrument. So I had to search and search until, quite recently, I found one."

== Reception ==
Record World praised the song's "vocal and musical inspiration."

== In popular culture ==
- The song features in the 2009 film (500) Days of Summer, where Joseph Gordon-Levitt's character breaks out into a spontaneous dance number while walking down the street. Daryl Hall and John Oates themselves were originally going to be included in this scene.
- The National Hockey League's Toronto Maple Leafs used the song as their goal song from the 2018–19 season until the end of the 2022–23 season.
- The Milwaukee Brewers use this song as their victory song at the end of winning games.

== Personnel ==
- Daryl Hall – lead and backing vocals, keyboards
- John Oates – electric guitar, backing vocals
- John Siegler – bass guitar, backing vocals
- Jerry Marotta – drums

== Charts ==
=== Weekly charts ===
Chart (1981)	Peak position
Australia (Kent Music Report)	40
Canada Top Singles (RPM)	17
US Billboard Hot 100	5
US Mainstream Rock (Billboard)	35
US Cash Box Top 100	7
US Radio & Records CHR/Pop Airplay Chart	4

=== Year-end charts ===
Chart (1981)	Rank
US Billboard Hot 100	43
US Cash Box	54

== Certifications ==
Region	Certification	Certified units/sales
Australia (ARIA)	3× Platinum	210,000^{‡}
Denmark (IFPI Danmark)	Gold	45,000^{‡}
Germany (BVMI)	Gold	300,000^{‡}
Italy (FIMI)	Gold	50,000^{‡}
New Zealand (RMNZ)	6× Platinum	180,000^{‡}
Portugal (AFP)	Gold	20,000^{‡}
Spain (Promusicae)	Gold	30,000^{‡}
United Kingdom (BPI)	3× Platinum	1,800,000^{‡}
^{‡} Sales+streaming figures based on certification alone.
