= Roland CR-78 =

Drum machine

The Roland CompuRhythm CR-78 is a drum machine released by Roland Corporation in 1978. It was adopted by new wave musicians and by acts including Phil Collins, Hall & Oates, OMD, Tears for Fears, Blondie and Radiohead. Roland also released the smaller CR-68, which could not be programmed.

== Development ==
In the 1960s, drum machines were most often used to accompany home organs. They did not allow users to program rhythms, but instead offered preset patterns such as bossa nova. By the late 1970s, microprocessors were appearing in instruments such as the Roland MC-8 Microcomposer. The Roland founder, Ikutaro Kakehashi, realized they could be used to program drum machines.

== Features ==
CR-78 Presets - upper row

CR-78 Presets - lower row

CR-78 Variation fill ins

The CR-78 was the first drum machine to use a microprocessor, and the first drum machine with which users could write, save and replay their own patterns. It has 17 preset patterns, including bossa nova, samba, mambo, beguine, rhumba and waltz, each with two variations. Pressing two buttons simultaneously plays a combination of the two patterns. Fills and breaks can also be added.

The CR-78 offers 14 sounds, with four-note polyphony (meaning it can produce up to four sounds at the same time). The sounds are generated with analog synthesis, meaning they do not use samples (prerecorded sounds). They include a kick, snare, rimshot, hi-hat, cymbal, and high and low congas and bongos. Roland also released a smaller unit, the CR-68, which could not be programmed.

Demonstration of the Roland CR-78 CompuRhythm
The preset "rhumba" pattern with metallic effect

== Legacy ==
The CR-78 was released in 1978 and initially received little attention. According to Gordon Reid of Sound on Sound, it seemed similar to other drum machines and its presets resembled those built into home organs.

The CR-78 has been used in songs including "In the Air Tonight" by Phil Collins, "I Can't Go for That (No Can Do)" by Hall & Oates, "Enola Gay" by OMD, "Mad World" by Tears for Fears, "Heart of Glass" by Blondie, and in live performances by Radiohead. It became popular with new wave musicians in the late 1970s and early 1980s. MusicRadar wrote in 2021 that while the CR-78 did not offer the "floor-shaking rumble" of Roland's later machine, the TR-808, it "pumps and percolates, ticks and snaps in its own special way. The raw analogue drum tones are bursting with character and it can add instant atmosphere to a mix."
