= Blue-eyed soul =

Term sometimes used for soul music performed by white artists

Blue-eyed soul (also called white soul) is rhythm and blues (R&B) and soul music performed by white artists. The term was coined in the mid-1960s, to describe white artists whose sound was similar to that of the predominantly black Motown and Stax record labels. Though many R&B radio stations in the United States in that period would only play music by black musicians, some began to play music by white acts considered to have "soul feeling"; their music was then described as "blue-eyed soul".

== 1960s ==
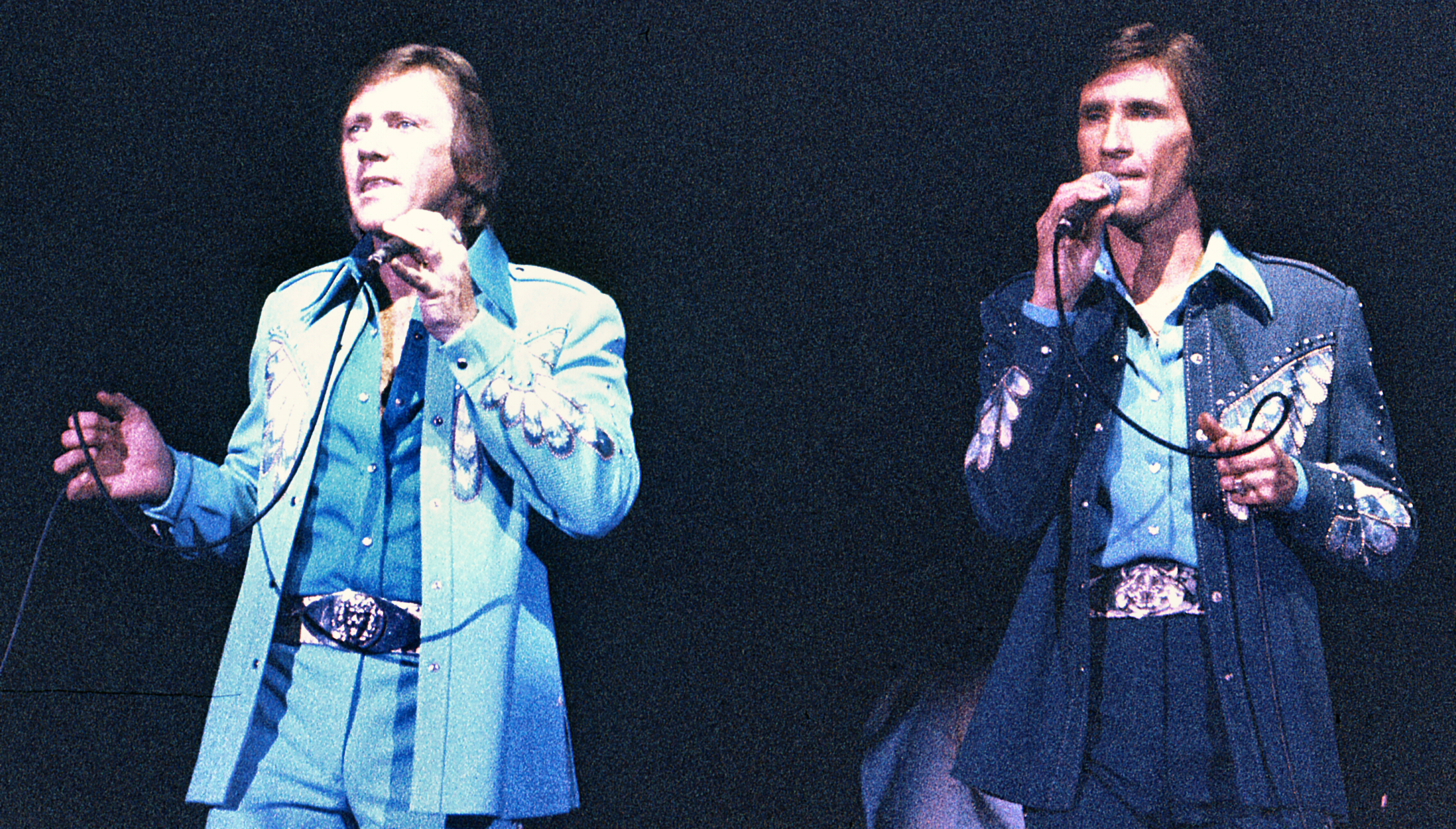
The Righteous Brothers, one of the early artists most closely associated with blue-eyed soul

Georgie Woods, a Philadelphia radio DJ, is thought to have coined the term "blue-eyed soul" in 1964, initially to describe the Righteous Brothers, then white artists in general who received airplay on rhythm and blues radio stations. The Righteous Brothers in turn named their 1964 LP Some Blue-Eyed Soul. According to Bill Medley of the Righteous Brothers, R&B radio stations who played their songs were surprised to find them to be white when they turned up for interviews, and one DJ in Philadelphia (unnamed by Medley but probably Georgie Woods) started saying "Here's my blue-eyed soul brothers", and it became a code to signal to the audience that they were white singers. The popularity of the Righteous Brothers who had a hit with "You've Lost That Lovin' Feelin'" is thought to have started the trend of R&B radio stations to play songs by white artists in the mid-1960s, a more integrative approach that was then popular with their audience. The term blue-eyed soul was then applied to such artists as Sonny & Cher, Tom Jones, Barry McGuire, and Roy Head.

White musicians playing R&B music, however, began before the term blue-eyed soul was coined. For instance, in the early 1960s, one of the rare female blue-eyed soul singers was Timi Yuro, whose vocal delivery and repertoire were influenced by African-American singers such as Dinah Washington.

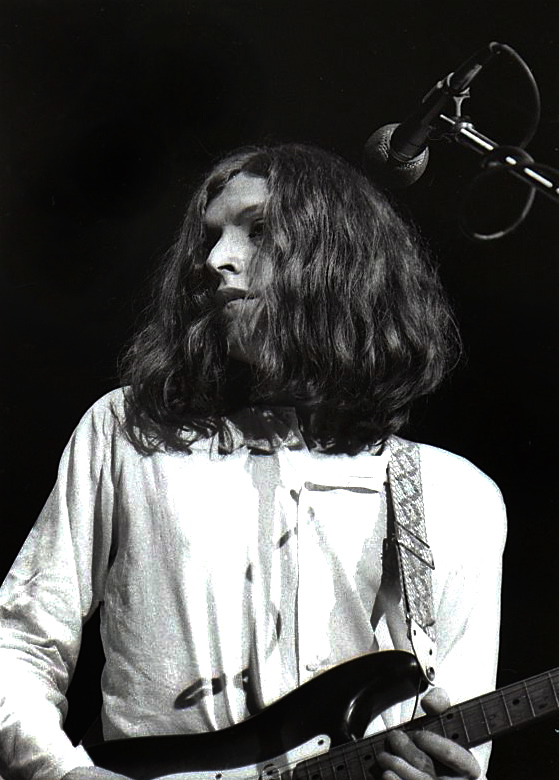
Steve Winwood performing with Traffic, 1969

Lonnie Mack's 1963 gospel-infused vocals earned him widespread critical acclaim as a blue-eyed soul singer. Len Barry, former lead singer on the Dovells, recorded blue-eyed soul hits in 1965 and 1966 for Decca Records in the US and released by Brunswick Records: "1-2-3", "Like a Baby", and "I Struck It Rich", a song he wrote with Leon Huff of the Philadelphia International Records producers, Gamble and Huff. Groups such as the Rascals had soul-tinged pop songs, but it was the soulful vocals of Felix Cavaliere that gave them the blue-eyed soul sound.

By the mid-1960s, British singers Dusty Springfield, Eric Burdon, and Tom Jones had become leading vocal stars of the emerging style. Other notable UK exponents of blue-eyed soul included the Spencer Davis Group (featuring Steve Winwood), Van Morrison, and archetypal mod band the Small Faces, whose sound was heavily influenced by the Stax label's house band Booker T. & the M.G.'s. Blonde, blue-eyed soul singer Chris Clark became the first white singer to have an R&B hit with "Love's Gone Bad" with Motown Records in 1966. In 1969, Kiki Dee became the first British artist to sign and record with Motown. Some British rock groups of the 1960s – such as the Spencer Davis Group, the Rolling Stones ("My Girl"), and the Who ("Heat Wave") – covered Motown and rhythm and blues tracks.

In 1967, Jerry Lee Lewis, whose latter days at Sun Records (1961–63) had been characterized by R&B covers, recorded an album for Smash entitled Soul My Way. In the late 1960s, Elvis Presley began embracing soul music in his recordings, and released From Elvis in Memphis in 1969, an album of blue-eyed soul, southern soul and country soul. Delaney and Bonnie (Bramlett) produced the blue-eyed soul album Home on Stax in 1969. Michael Sembello, who left home at age 17 to tour with Stevie Wonder, wrote and performed on numerous blue-eyed soul hits for Wonder, Brian McKnight, David Sanborn, Bill Champlin, and Bobby Caldwell. Todd Rundgren began his career in Woody's Truck Stop, a group based on the model of the Paul Butterfield Blues Band.

After splitting from Big Brother and the Holding Company, Janis Joplin formed a new backup group, the Kozmic Blues Band, composed of session musicians like keyboardist Stephen Ryder and saxophonist Cornelius "Snooky" Flowers, as well as former Big Brother and the Holding Company guitarist Sam Andrew and future Full Tilt Boogie Band bassist Brad Campbell. The band was influenced by the Stax-Volt rhythm and blues (R&B) and soul bands of the 1960s, as exemplified by Otis Redding and the Bar-Kays.

Joe Cocker, who sang soul-oriented covers of songs such as "With a Little Help from My Friends", was said by the Chicago Sun Times to have "opened the door for all blue-eyed soul singers after him".

== 1970s ==
Hamilton, Joe Frank & Reynolds and the Grass Roots both had successful blue-eyed soul singles; the former with "Don't Pull Your Love" (1971) and the latter with "Two Divided by Love" (1971) and "The Runway" (1972). In 1973, the American band Stories and the Canadian group Skylark had successes with their respective blue-eyed soul singles "Brother Louie" and "Wildflower". In February 1975, Tower of Power became the first white/mixed act to appear on Soul Train. Also in 1975, David Bowie, another early white artist to appear on Soul Train, released Young Americans, a popular blue-eyed soul album which Bowie himself called "plastic soul". It featured the funk-inspired "Fame", which became Bowie's first number-one hit in the US. Hall & Oates' 1975 Daryl Hall & John Oates includes the ballad "Sara Smile", long considered a blue-eyed soul standard. "She's Gone", another soulful hit, was originally released in 1973 but did better as a re-release after "Sara Smile". Bobby Caldwell, one of the most notable purveyors of blue-eyed soul, released his enduring hit "What You Won't Do for Love" in 1978.

== 1980s ==
Blue-eyed soul music's chart success was at its highest when Hall and Oates' singles got heavy airplay on urban contemporary radio, as was the case with "I Can't Go for That (No Can Do)", "Kiss on My List", "One on One", "Say It Isn't So", "Adult Education", "Out of Touch", "Method of Modern Love" and "Everytime You Go Away". Most of those singles charted on the R&B and dance charts, including some number-one hits. In 1985, Simply Red released "Holding Back the Years", one of the most successful blue-eyed soul ballads. "Money's Too Tight (to Mention)" and other singles by the group also performed well.

Other successful blue-eyed soul songs of the 1980s include: Phil Collins' cover of "You Can't Hurry Love" (1982); Culture Club's "Do You Really Want to Hurt Me" (1982), "Time (Clock of the Heart)" (1982) and "Church of the Poison Mind" (1983); Dexys Midnight Runners' "Come On Eileen" (1983); the Style Council's "Shout to the Top" (1984); Teena Marie's "Lovergirl" (1985); Paul Young's "Every Time You Go Away" (1985); Eurythmics' "Missionary Man" (1986), and Steve Winwood's "Roll with It" (1988). As the decade drew to a close, British artist Lisa Stansfield had considerable success on R&B radio, scoring three number-one R&B hits, the most popular being "All Around the World".

In the mid-1980s, George Michael found a phenomenal success in the US Hot R&B/Hip-Hop Songs with hit singles such as "Careless Whisper" and "Everything She Wants" but it was not until he reinvented himself as a white soul singer with the release of his multi-platinum album Faith (1987). The album was notable for slowly climbing to the top of the Top R&B/Hip-Hop Albums chart, making it the first album by a white artist to hit the top spot on that chart, mainly due to the gospel-influenced singles that were released from the album, most notably "Father Figure" and "One More Try". In 1989, he racked up three wins in the American Music Awards including Favorite Soul/R&B Male Artist and Favorite Soul/R&B Album for Faith.

== 1990s ==
Dance-pop singer Rick Astley shifted to blue-eyed soul and adult contemporary in the early 1990s with Free, featuring the hit "Cry for Help".

Jon Gibson transitioned from secular music to contemporary Christian music in the late-1980s. His most successful song "Jesus Loves Ya" spent a record eleven weeks at No. 1 on the Christian Hit Radio (CHR) charts in 1991.

In the mid-1990s, Jon B. gained widespread recognition with his debut album Bonafide (1995) and the hit single "They Don’t Know".

== 2000s and 2010s ==
Joss Stone received acclaim after releasing her first album The Soul Sessions in 2003. Scottish musician Paolo Nutini's first two albums, which were influenced by soul music, were certified quintuple platinum by the British Phonographic Industry. Adele's debut album 19 was a global success.

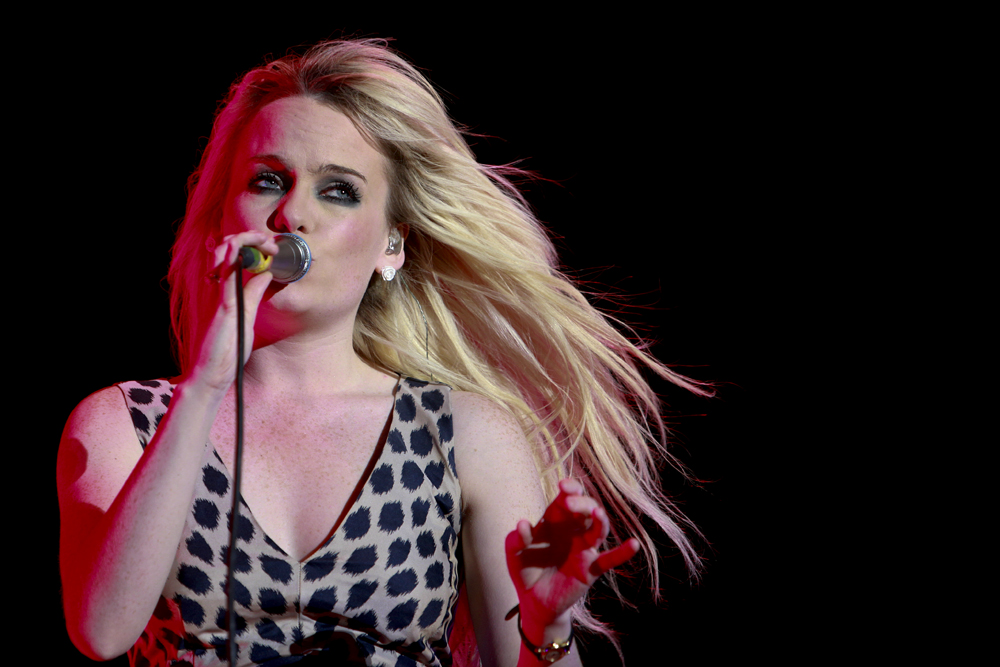
Duffy, Welsh soul artist

== Criticism ==
A backlash ensued in the late 1980s as some black people felt that white people were cashing in on the popularity of their music. The extent of the backlash, however, was not universally agreed upon. In 1989, Ebony Magazine published an article exploring whether white people were "taking over" R&B. The article featured various members of the music industry, both black and white, who believed collaboration was a unifying force, and there was agreement that the future of R&B was not compromised by the contemporary urban sound. A similar article in Ebony, written in 1999 highlighted conflicting opinions about the "blue-eyed" influence; however, the source of contention was not about the artistic merit of blue-eyed soul, but rather the economic inequality that persisted in American life and within the music industry.

According to scholar Joanna Teresa Demers, the "successors [of Presley] in blue-eyed soul and white funk" embittered poet Gil Scott-Heron, as it proved that "blacks were still being victimized by cultural appropriation, making their contributions to American history virtually invisible and inaudible." The "long tradition of white co-optation of black cultural identity" since Elvis amounting to "artistic theft" was, in Scott-Heron's words, "no new thing."

Daryl Hall has described the term "blue-eyed soul" as racist, saying "it assumes I'm coming from the outside. There's always been that thing in America, where if you're a white guy and you're singing or playing in a black idiom, it's like: 'Why is he doing that? Is he from the outside, looking in? Is he copying? What's the point of it?' C'mon, it's music! It's music."

== See also ==
- List of blue-eyed soul artists
- 1960s in music
- Brown-eyed soul
- Sophisti-pop – a term applied to a number of 1980s pop acts, many of whom would have fallen under the 'blue-eyed soul' tag at the time
- Yacht rock – another music genre term applied retroactively to a certain group of acts by journalists and fans
- Plastic Soul
