= Kiss on My List =

1980 single by Hall & Oates

Single by Hall & Oates

from the album Voices
- B-side: "Africa"
- Released: November 1980
- Recorded: 1980
- Genre: Synth-pop; new wave; yacht rock; pop-soul
- Length: 4:25 (album version); 3:48 (7" version)
- Label: RCA Victor
- Songwriters: Daryl Hall; Janna Allen
- Producers: Daryl Hall; John Oates

Hall & Oates singles chronology
"You've Lost That Lovin' Feelin'" (1980)	"Kiss on My List" (1980)	"You Make My Dreams" (1981)

Music video
- "Kiss on My List" on YouTube

"Kiss on My List" is a song by American duo Hall & Oates. It was written by Daryl Hall and Janna Allen, and produced by Hall and John Oates. It was the third single release from their ninth studio album, Voices (1980), and became their second US Billboard Hot 100 number-one single (after "Rich Girl" in 1977). It spent three weeks at the top spot.

The music video was the 204th that aired on MTV's first day of broadcast. The 45 rpm version of the song appears on the compilation albums Rock 'n Soul Part 1 (1983) and Playlist: The Very Best of Daryl Hall & John Oates (2008).

== Background ==
The song was written with the intention that Janna Allen, sister of Hall's longtime girlfriend Sara Allen, would sing it, for she was interested in starting a music career. Hall cut a demo version as a guide for her, but later when his manager found the tape lying around the studio, he insisted that Hall and Oates cut the song themselves. In fact, the production team liked the demo so much that they did not do a second take, instead adding background vocals and instrumentation to the demo and mixing them together. Hall recalled that is why the drums sounded so "dinky" – the "drums" in fact being the early Roland CR-78 drum machine mixed in with a live drumming overdub.

Hall calls it an anti-love song, with the song title being tongue-in-cheek sarcasm in that the kiss is not that important, in that it is on a list of other things that are just as important.

In an interview with Mix magazine, Daryl Hall said: "Eddie Van Halen told me that he copied the synth part from 'Kiss on My List' and used it in 'Jump.' I don't have a problem with that at all."

== Reception ==
Record World said it has "a bouncy pop sound with heavenly harmonies".

== Personnel ==
- Daryl Hall – lead vocals, keyboards, synthesizers
- John Oates – backing vocals, 6- and 12-string guitars, Roland CR-78 drum machine
- John Siegler – bass guitar
- Jerry Marotta – drums

Additional musicians

- Jeff Southworth – lead guitar
- Mike Klvana – equipment technician

== Charts ==
=== Weekly charts ===
Chart (1981)	Peak position
Australia (Kent Music Report)	13
Canada Top Singles (RPM)	6
New Zealand (Recorded Music NZ)	33
UK Singles (Official Charts)	33
US Billboard Hot 100	1
US Adult Contemporary (Billboard)	16
US Mainstream Rock Airplay (Billboard)	54

=== Year-end charts ===
Chart (1981)	Rank
Australia (Kent Music Report)	83
Canada Top Singles (RPM)	32
US Billboard Hot 100	7

== Certifications ==
Region	Certification	Certified units/sales
New Zealand (RMNZ)	Gold	15,000^{‡}
^{‡} Sales+streaming figures based on certification alone.

== See also ==
- List of Hot 100 number-one singles of 1981 (U.S.)
