= Janna Allen =

American songwriter (1957–1993)

Janna Allen (May 12, 1957 – August 25, 1993) was an American songwriter. She is best known as a co-writer of some of the biggest hits recorded by Hall & Oates, in collaboration variously with Daryl Hall, John Oates and her sister Sara Allen, who was Hall's longtime girlfriend and the person for whom the duo's hit song "Sara Smile" was written.

Among Janna Allen's most successful co-written songs for Hall & Oates were "Kiss on My List" and "Private Eyes", both of which reached #1 on the Billboard Hot 100 in 1981. She worked as a receptionist at the time of the two songs' release. She also co-wrote Hall & Oates' top 10 singles "Did It in a Minute" and "Method of Modern Love".

Allen also wrote songs with such artists as Cheap Trick, Peter Wolf and Joan Jett.

Allen died of leukemia at the age of 36 in 1993.
