= I Can't Go for That (No Can Do) =

1981 single by Daryl Hall & John Oates

- Original US single

Single by Daryl Hall & John Oates

from the album Private Eyes
- B-side: "Unguarded Minute"
- Released: November 1981
- Recorded: March 1981
- Studio: Electric Lady, New York City
- Genre: Synth-pop; soft rock; new wave; electro-soul
- Length: 5:09 (album version); 4:14 (video edit); 3:45 (single edit); 6:05 (extended club mix)
- Label: RCA
- Songwriters: Sara Allen; Daryl Hall; John Oates
- Producers: Hall & Oates

Daryl Hall & John Oates singles chronology
"Private Eyes" (1981)	"I Can't Go for That (No Can Do)" (1981)	"Did It in a Minute" (1982)

Music video
- "I Can't Go for That (No Can Do)" on YouTube

"I Can't Go for That (No Can Do)" is a song by American duo Daryl Hall & John Oates. Written by Daryl Hall, John Oates and Sara Allen, the song was released as the second single from their tenth studio album, Private Eyes (1981). The song became the fourth number one hit single of their career on the Billboard Hot 100. It features Charles DeChant on saxophone.

== Composition ==
Daryl Hall sketched out the basic song one evening at a music studio in New York City, in 1981, after a recording session for the Private Eyes album. Hall started the Rock 1 setting on a Roland CompuRhythm (or an Ace Tone Rhythm Ace) drum machine, then began playing a bass line on a Korg organ, and sound engineer Neil Kernon recorded the result. Hall then came up with a guitar riff, which he and Oates worked on together. The next day, Hall, Oates and Sara Allen worked on the lyrics.

Speaking about the meaning of the lyrics, John Oates has stated that while many listeners may assume the lyrics are about a relationship, in reality, the song, "is about the music business. That song is really about not being pushed around by big labels, managers, and agents and being told what to do, and being true to yourself creatively." This was done intentionally, he explained, to universalize the topic of the song into something everyone could relate to and ascribe personal meaning to in their own way. Naming "Maneater" as another example, he revealed that this was a common characteristic of the group's songs.

== Reception ==
Record World said that it "demonstrates the duo's versatility as pop craftsmen" and noted that there are many hooks.

== Personnel ==
- Daryl Hall – lead vocals and backing vocals, synthesizers, Roland CR-78 drum machine
- John Oates – electric guitar, backing vocals
- Charles DeChant – saxophone
- John Siegler – bass

== Chart performance ==
The single debuted at number 59 on the Hot 100 the week of November 14, 1981 as the highest debut of the week and after eleven weeks, on January 30, 1982, it reached the top of the chart, staying there for a week. "I Can't Go for That" ended a 10-week run at the top of the Hot 100 by Olivia Newton-John's song, "Physical" (which had knocked out Hall & Oates' "Private Eyes" from the top spot). The song also went to number one on the Hot Dance Club Play chart for one week in January 1982.

Thanks to heavy airplay on urban contemporary radio stations, "I Can't Go for That" also topped the US R&B chart, a rare feat for a white act. It was the only record to hit number one on both the Hot 100 and then-Hot Soul charts during all of 1982. The single was certified Gold by the RIAA for shipments of one million units on January 7, 1982. According to the Hall & Oates biography, Hall, upon learning that "I Can't Go for That" had gone to number one on the R&B chart, wrote in his diary, "I'm the head soul brother in the U.S. Where to now?"

It also peaked at number one on the Radio & Records CHR/Pop Airplay chart on December 18, 1981, staying at the top of the chart for six weeks and remaining on it for fifteen weeks, making it their biggest hit on the R&R airplay chart. This single was also the first top 10 hit for the duo in the UK, peaking at number eight in the UK Singles Chart. It was certified Silver by the BPI on March 1, 1982 for shipments of 250,000 units.

== Charts ==
=== Weekly ===
Chart (1981–1982)	Peak position
Australia (Kent Music Report)	13
Canada Top Singles (RPM)	2
Canada RPM Adult Contemporary	1
Germany (GfK)	72
Ireland (IRMA)	9
Netherlands (Single Top 100)	13
New Zealand (Recorded Music NZ)	5
Sweden (Sverigetopplistan)	10
UK Singles (Official Charts)	8
US Billboard Hot 100	1
US Adult Contemporary (Billboard)	12
US Dance Club Songs (Billboard)	1
US Hot Soul Singles (Billboard)	1
US Mainstream Rock Airplay (Billboard)	28
US Radio & Records CHR/Pop Airplay Chart	1

=== Year-end ===
Chart (1982)	Rank
Australia (Kent Music Report)	96
Canada Top Singles (RPM)	16
US Billboard Hot 100	15

== Certifications ==
Region	Certification	Certified units/sales
Canada (Music Canada)	Gold	50,000^{^}
New Zealand (RMNZ)	Platinum	30,000^{‡}
United Kingdom (BPI)	Silver	250,000^{^}
United States (RIAA)	Gold	1,000,000^{^}
^{^} Shipments figures based on certification alone.^{‡} Sales+streaming figures based on certification alone.

== Legacy ==
"I Can't Go for That" was voted number six on VH1's list of "The 100 Greatest Songs of the '80s."

=== Samples ===
The song has been sampled numerous times including in "Say No Go" by De La Soul, "Sunrise" by Simply Red, "The Final Hour" and "Take Me to Your Leader" by MF Doom (under the King Geedorah moniker), and "On Hold" by The xx. Anderson .Paak has stated that Dr. Dre's "Nuthin' but a 'G' Thang" was originally also going to sample the song.

=== Influence on "Billie Jean" ===
According to Daryl Hall, during the recording of "We Are the World", Michael Jackson approached him and admitted to lifting the bass line for "Billie Jean" from a Hall & Oates song, apparently referring to "I Can't Go for That (No Can Do)." Hall says that he told Jackson that he had lifted the bass line from another song himself, and that it was "something we all do."

== See also ==
- List of number-one dance hits (United States)
- List of Billboard Hot 100 number-one singles of 1982
