= Sara Allen =

American songwriter (born 1954)

- Born: March 23, 1954 (age 72); Wooster, Ohio
- Genres: Blue-eyed soul; pop rock; R&B; soul; Philly soul; soft rock
- Occupation: Songwriter

Sara Allen (born March 23, 1954) is an American songwriter best known for her work with the duo Hall & Oates.

Working as a flight attendant in the early 1970s, Allen was introduced to John Oates, who subsequently wrote the song "Las Vegas Turnaround (The Stewardess Song)" which featured on the duo's second album Abandoned Luncheonette about Allen, who had begun a long-term relationship with Daryl Hall, which lasted until 2001. Hall wrote the song "Sara Smile", Hall & Oates' first American hit from the duo's fourth album Daryl Hall & John Oates, about Allen in 1975. A former boyfriend of Allen's was also the inspiration for the duo's 1977 hit single "Rich Girl".

Allen contributed to many of the duo's hit singles, including "You Make My Dreams", "Private Eyes", "I Can't Go for That (No Can Do)" and "Maneater".

Her sister Janna Allen was another songwriter who worked with Hall & Oates.
