= Charles DeChant =

American saxophone and keyboard player

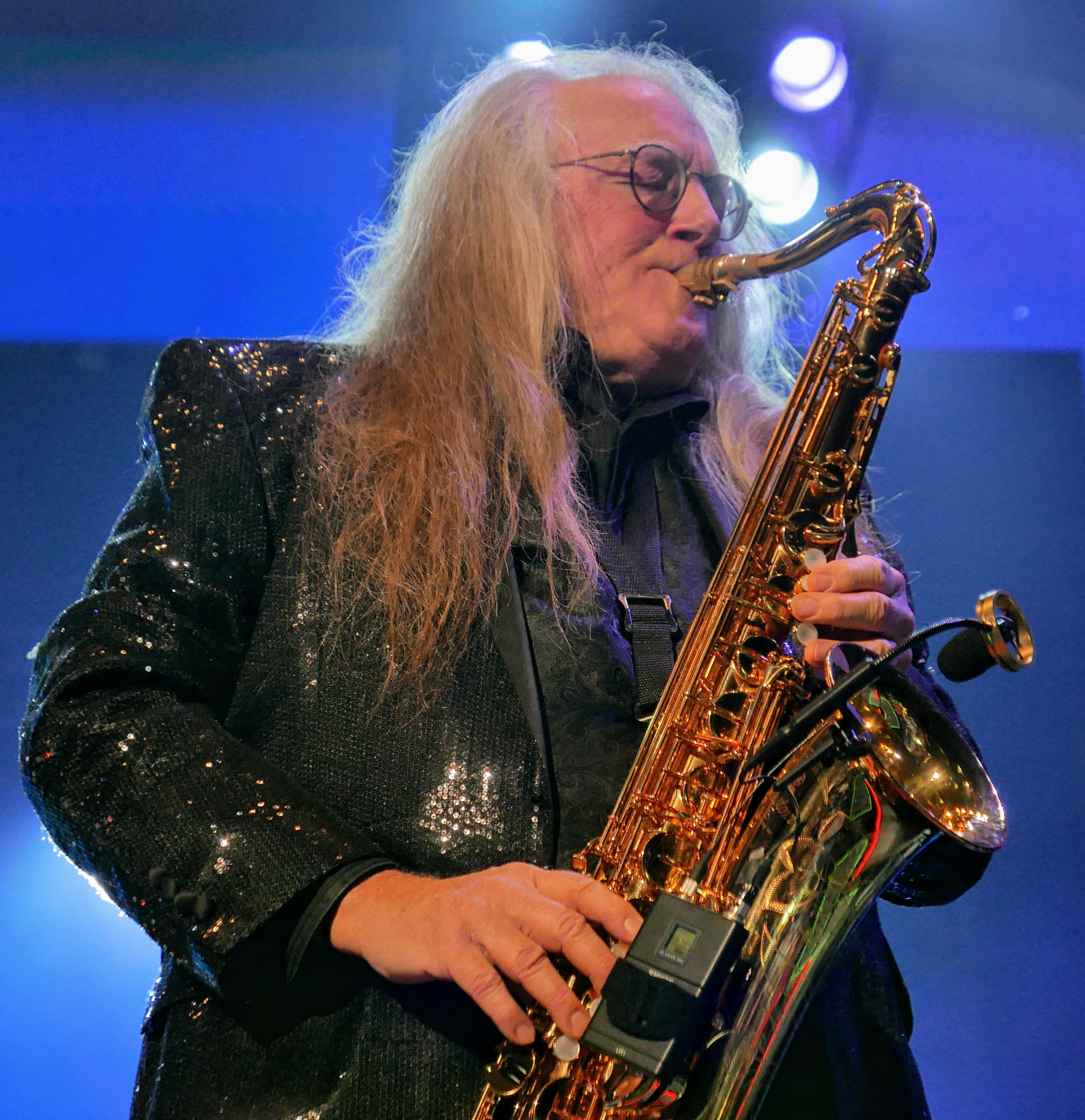
- Charles DeChant performing in 2018

Background information
- Also known as: Mr. Casual
- Born: June 10, 1945 (age 81); Florida, U.S.
- Occupation: Musician
- Instruments: Saxophone; flute; keyboards
- Website: charliedechant.com

Charles DeChant (born June 10, 1945) is an American musician. He is best known for his association with Hall & Oates.

== Career ==
Born in Florida on June 10, 1945, DeChant has been playing in Hall & Oates since 1976. Notable saxophone solos are heard in the songs "One on One", "Maneater," the extended version of "Say It Isn't So," and "I Can't Go for That (No Can Do)." American Songwriter declared "Maneater", with DeChant's performance, the biggest hit of the 1980s to feature a saxophone solo. DeChant toured with Hall & Oates throughout the 2010s and has been a sometime member of Daryl Hall's band for Live from Daryl's House.
