= Hall & Oates discography =

Daryl Hall & John Oates discography
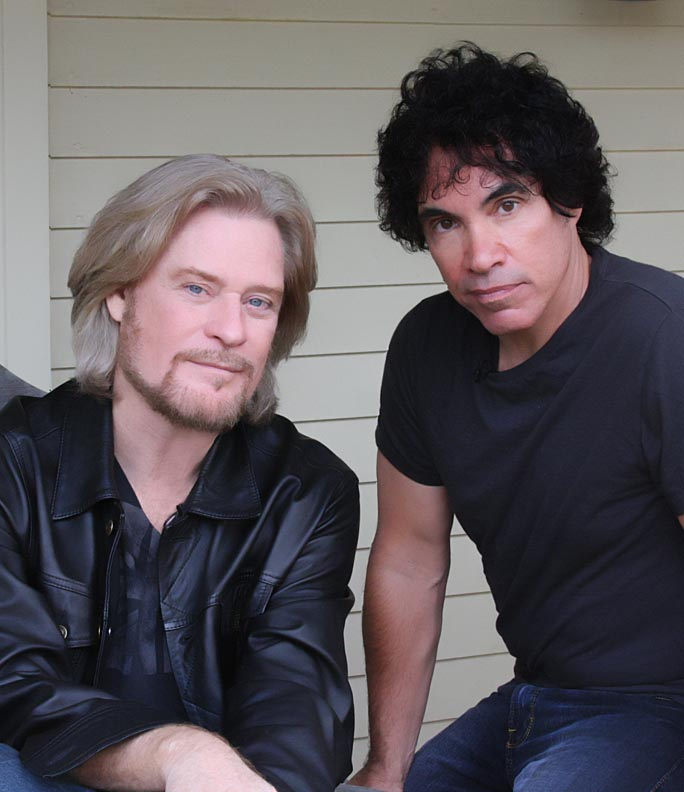
- Daryl Hall (left) and John Oates (right), 2008
- Studio albums: 18
- Live albums: 11
- Compilation albums: 27
- Singles: 63
- Music videos: 35

American musical duo Daryl Hall & John Oates has released 18 studio albums and 63 singles. The duo has had eight albums certified platinum (including three double platinum) and an additional six albums certified gold by the RIAA. They have also had six singles certified gold. Certifications have totaled 14 million albums and six million singles.

== Albums ==
=== Studio albums ===
Year	Album details	Peak chart positions								Certifications
Year	Album details	US	US R&B	AUS	CAN	NL	NZ	SWE	UK	Certifications
1972	Whole Oats: Released: September 1972; Label: Atlantic; Format: 8-track, cassette tape, CD, LP	—	—	—	—	—	—	—	—	
1973	Abandoned Luncheonette: Released: November 3, 1973; Label: Atlantic; Format: 8-track, cassette, CD, HDCD, LP	33	—	—	—	—	—	—	—	RIAA: Platinum; BPI: Silver
1974	War Babies: Released: November 1974; Label: Atlantic; Format: 8-track, cassette, CD, LP	86	—	—	91	—	—	—	—	
1975	Daryl Hall & John Oates: Released: August 18, 1975; Label: RCA; Format: 8-track, cassette, CD, LP	17	50	—	35	13	—	—	56	RIAA: Gold
1976	Bigger Than Both of Us: Released: August 1976; Label: RCA; Format: 8-track, cassette, CD, LP	13	33	23	11	—	—	45	25	RIAA: Gold
1977	Beauty on a Back Street: Released: October 11, 1977; Label: RCA; Format: 8-track, cassette, CD, LP	30	—	60	54	—	—	—	40	RIAA: Gold
1978	Along the Red Ledge: Released: August 21, 1978; Label: RCA; Format: 8-track, cassette, CD, LP	27	—	69	52	—	—	—	—	RIAA: Gold
1979	X-Static: Released: September 1979; Label: RCA; Format: 8-track, cassette, CD, LP	33	—	74	79	—	—	—	—	
1980	Voices: Released: July 29, 1980; Label: RCA; Format: 8-track, cassette, CD, LP, SACD	17	—	19	—	—	—	—	—	RIAA: Platinum; MC: Gold
1981	Private Eyes: Released: September 1, 1981; Label: RCA; Format: 8-track, cassette, CD, LP, SACD	5	11	27	14	13	9	17	8	RIAA: Platinum; BPI: Silver; MC: Platinum
1982	H_{2}O: Released: October 4, 1982; Label: RCA; Format: 8-track, Cassette, CD, LP, SACD	3	8	3	1	30	3	8	24	RIAA: 2× Platinum; ARIA: Platinum; BPI: Platinum; MC: 3× Platinum
1984	Big Bam Boom: Released: October 12, 1984; Label: RCA; Format: 8-track, Cassette, CD, LP	5	25	20	12	43	12	16	28	RIAA: 2× Platinum; BPI: Silver; MC: 2× Platinum
1988	Ooh Yeah!: Released: April 28, 1988; Label: Arista; Format: 8-track, cassette, CD, LP	24	30	46	15	47	35	27	52	RIAA: Platinum; MC: Gold
1990	Change of Season: Released: October 9, 1990; Label: Arista; Format: Cassette, CD, LP	60	—	137	39	—	—	38	44	RIAA: Gold
1997	Marigold Sky: Released: September 30, 1997; Label: Push; Format: Cassette, CD, LP	95	—	—	—	—	—	—	179	
2003	Do It for Love: Released: February 11, 2003; Label: U-Watch, Sanctuary; Format: Cassette, CD, LP	77	—	—	—	—	—	54	37	
2004	Our Kind of Soul: Released: October 26, 2004; Label: U-Watch; Format: CD	69	71	—	—	—	—	—	86	
2006	Home for Christmas: Released: October 3, 2006; Label: U-Watch; Format: CD, LP	—	—	—	—	—	—	—	—	
"—" denotes a recording that did not chart or was not released in that territory.

=== Live albums ===
Year	Album details	Peak chart positions							Certifications
Year	Album details	US	US R&B	AUS	CAN	NL	SWE	UK	Certifications
1978	Livetime: Released: May 16, 1978; Label: RCA; Format: 8-track, CD, LP	42	—	76	—	—	—	—	
1984	Sweet Soul Music: Released: 1984; Label: RAB (Unofficial release); Format: LP	—	—	—	—	—	—	—	
1985	Live at the Apollo (with David Ruffin and Eddie Kendrick): Released: September 1985; Label: RCA; Format: Cassette, CD, LP	21	41	39	24	41	35	32	RIAA: Gold; MC: Gold
1995	Sara Smile: Released: 1995; Label: MasterTone (UK); Format: VCD	—	—	—	—	—	—	—	
1998	Live!: Released: 1998 (Promotional only release); Label: PUSH; Format: CD	—	—	—	—	—	—	—	
2001	Limited Edition: Released: 2001 (Promotional only release); Label: No label; Format: CD	—	—	—	—	—	—	—	
2001	Ecstasy on the Edge: Released: October 9, 2001; Label: Burning Airlines (UK); Format: CD	—	—	—	—	—	—	—	
2001	Greatest Hits Live: Released: November 6, 2001; Label: RCA; Format: CD	—	—	—	—	—	—	—	
2003	Live in Concert: Released: March 24, 2003; Label: DKE; Format: CD+DVD	—	—	—	—	—	—	—	
2008	Live at the Troubadour: Released: November 25, 2008; Label: Shout! Factory, U-Watch, DKE; Format: CD+DVD	—	—	—	—	—	—	—	
2015	Live in Dublin: Released: March 27, 2015; Label: Eagle Rock Entertainment; Format: CD+DVD	—	—	—	—	—	—	—	
2020	Live In Pittsburgh 1978: Label: Timeline Music; Format: CD	—	—	—	—	—	—	—	
"—" denotes a recording that did not chart or was not released in that territory.

=== Compilation albums ===
Year	Album details	Peak chart positions								Certifications
Year	Album details	US	US R&B	AUS	CAN	NL	NZ	SWE	UK	Certifications
1977	No Goodbyes: Released: February 18, 1977; Label: Atlantic; Format: 8-track, CD, LP	92	—	—	—	—	—	—	—	
1977	Past Times Behind aka The Early Years: Released: 1977; Label: Chelsea Records; Format: LP	—	—	—	—	—	—	—	—	
1981	The Hall & Oates Collection: Released: 1981; Label: RCA (AUS) (NZ); Cassette, CD, LP	—	—	33	—	—	18	—	—	
1983	Rock 'n Soul Part 1: Released: October 18, 1983; Label: RCA; Cassette, CD, LP	7	26	12	12	9	1	43	16	RIAA: 2× Platinum; BPI: Silver; MC: 2× Platinum; RMNZ: Gold
1988	The Big Ones: Released: 1988; Label: Concept (AUS); Cassette, CD, LP	—	—	45	—	—	—	—	—	
1989	Special Mix on CD: Released: August 21, 1989; Label: Arista; CD	—	—	—	—	—	—	—	—	
1991	The Best of Hall & Oates: Released: 1991; Label: RCA (AUS); CD	—	—	54	—	—	—	—	—	
1991	Looking Back – The Best of Daryl Hall + John Oates: Released: 1991; Label: BMG, RCA, Arista; Cassette, CD, LP	—	—	—	—	48	—	—	9	BPI: Gold
1995	The Best of Times: Greatest Hits: Released: November 10, 1995; Label: RCA (JPN); CD	—	—	—	—	—	—	—	—	
1996	The Atlantic Collection: Released: January 23, 1996; Label: Rhino, Atlantic; CD	—	—	—	—	—	—	—	—	
1997	Best of Hall & Oates: Starting All Over Again: Released: October 14, 1997; Label: BMG, Arista; Format: CD	—	—	—	—	—	—	—	—	
1997	Romeo Is Bleeding, What's in Your World: The Best of Daryl Hall & John Oates: Released: 1997 (Promotional release only); Label: BMG, Arista (JPN); Format: CD	—	—	—	—	—	—	—	—	
1998	With Love From... The Best of the Ballads: Released: January 12, 1998; Label: BMG, Arista; Format: CD	—	—	—	—	—	—	—	—	
1998	Rich Girl: Released: 1998; Label: Camden, BMG; Format: CD	—	—	—	—	—	—	—	—	
2001	The Very Best of Daryl Hall & John Oates: Released: January 23, 2001; Label: RCA; Format: CD, LP	34	—	—	—	—	27	—	—	RIAA: Platinum; BPI: Gold
2001	The Ballads Collection: RCA 100 Years of Music: Released: August 7, 2001; Label: RCA; Format: CD	—	—	—	—	—	—	—	—	
2001	Definitive Collection: Released: 2001; Label: BMG (ARG); Format: CD	—	—	—	—	—	—	—	—	
2001	The Essential Collection: Released: September 24, 2001; Label: RCA, BMG; Format: CD	—	—	—	—	—	—	—	26	
2002	Legendary: Released: February 25, 2002; Label: BMG; Format: CD	—	—	—	—	—	—	—	—	
2002	VH1 Behind the Music: The Daryl Hall and John Oates Collection: Released: March 19, 2002; Label: RCA, Arista, BMG Heritage; Format: CD	—	—	—	—	—	—	—	—	
2003	12 Inch Collection: Released: May 21, 2003; Label: BMG, Arista, RCA (JPN); Format: CD	—	—	—	—	—	—	—	—	
2003	12 Inch Collection Vol. 2: Released: November 24, 2003; Label: BMG, Arista, RCA (JPN); Format: CD	—	—	—	—	—	—	—	—	
2004	Ultimate Daryl Hall + John Oates: Released: March 16, 2004; Label: BMG Heritage; Format: Cassette, CD	63	98	—	—	—	—	—	194	
2004	The Collection: Released: September 6, 2004; Label: BMG, RCA, Arista; Format: CD	—	—	—	—	—	—	—	—	
2005	The Essential Daryl Hall & John Oates: Released: June 14, 2005; Label: RCA, BMG, Arista, Legacy; Format: CD	—	—	—	—	—	—	—	—	BPI: Gold
2006	The Platinum Collection: Released: 2006; Label: Warner Platinum, Rhino; Format: CD	—	—	—	—	—	—	—	—	
2008	Playlist: The Very Best of Daryl Hall & John Oates: Released: April 29, 2008; Label: RCA, Legacy; Format: CD	—	—	—	—	—	—	—	—	
2008	The Singles: Released: June 2, 2008; Label: Sony BMG; Format: CD	—	—	—	—	—	—	—	29	BPI: Gold
2009	Do What You Want, Be What You Are: The Music of Daryl Hall & John Oates: Released: October 13, 2009; Label: RCA, Legacy, Sony BMG; Format: CD	89	—	—	—	—	—	—	—	
2017	Timeless Classics: Released: October 20, 2017; Label: Sony Music; Format: CD	—	—	—	—	—	—	—	12	
"—" denotes a recording that did not chart or was not released in that territory.

== Singles ==
Year	Title	Peak chart positions										Certifications	Album
Year	Title	US	US R&B/HH	US Dance	US AC	AUS	CAN	NL	NZ	SWE	UK	Certifications	Album
1972	"Goodnight and Good Morning" (as Whole Oats)	—	—	—	—	—	—	—	—	—	—		Whole Oats
1973	"I'm Sorry"	—	—	—	—	—	—	—	—	—	—		Whole Oats
1973	"She's Gone"	60	—	—	—	—	63	—	—	—	—	RMNZ: Gold	Abandoned Luncheonette
1974	"When the Morning Comes"	—	—	—	—	—	—	—	—	—	—		Abandoned Luncheonette
1974	"Can't Stop the Music (He Played It Much Too Long)"	—	—	—	—	—	—	—	—	—	—		War Babies
1975	"Camellia"	—	—	—	—	—	—	—	—	—	—		Daryl Hall & John Oates
1975	"Alone Too Long"	—	98	—	—	—	—	—	—	—	—		Daryl Hall & John Oates
1976	"Sara Smile"	4	23	—	18	—	22	—	22	—	—	RIAA: Gold; RMNZ: Gold	Daryl Hall & John Oates
1976	"She's Gone" (re-release)	7	93	—	6	52	7	—	—	—	42		Abandoned Luncheonette
1976	"Do What You Want, Be What You Are"	39	29	—	—	—	52	—	—	—	—		Bigger Than Both of Us
1977	"Rich Girl"	1	64	—	—	6	5	15	33	—	—	RIAA: Gold; BPI: Platinum; RMNZ: 5× Platinum	Bigger Than Both of Us
1977	"Back Together Again"	28	70	—	—	65	17	—	—	—	—		Bigger Than Both of Us
1977	"It's Uncanny"	80	—	—	—	—	73	—	—	—	—		No Goodbyes
1977	"Why Do Lovers (Break Each Other's Heart?)"	73	—	—	—	—	77	—	—	—	—		Beauty on a Back Street
1977	"Don't Change"	—	—	—	—	—	—	—	—	—	—		Beauty on a Back Street
1978	"It's a Laugh"	20	—	—	—	—	23	—	—	—	—		Along the Red Ledge
1978	"I Don't Wanna Lose You"	42	—	—	49	—	43	—	—	—	—		Along the Red Ledge
1979	"Wait for Me"	18	—	—	23	81	53	—	—	—	—		X-Static
1979	"Portable Radio"	—	—	—	—	—	—	—	—	—	—		X-Static
1980	"Who Said the World Was Fair"	110	—	—	—	—	—	—	—	—	—		X-Static
1980	"Running from Paradise"	—	—	37	—	—	—	—	—	—	41		X-Static
1980	"How Does It Feel to Be Back"	30	—	—	—	48	—	—	—	—	—		Voices
1980	"You've Lost That Lovin' Feelin'"	12	—	—	15	—	96	—	—	19	55		Voices
1981	"Kiss on My List"	1	—	—	16	13	6	—	33	—	33	RIAA: Gold; MC: Gold	Voices
1981	"You Make My Dreams"	5	—	—	—	40	17	—	—	—	—	ARIA: 3× Platinum; BPI: 3× Platinum; RMNZ: 6× Platinum	Voices
1981	"Private Eyes"	1	—	—	33	17	6	—	19	—	32	RIAA: Gold; MC: Gold; RMNZ: Gold	Private Eyes
1981	"I Can't Go for That (No Can Do)"	1	1	1	12	13	2	13	5	10	8	RIAA: Gold; BPI: Silver; MC: Gold; RMNZ: Gold	Private Eyes
1982	"Did It in a Minute"	9	—	—	29	—	10	—	—	—	—		Private Eyes
1982	"Your Imagination"	33	45	—	—	—	38	—	—	—	—		Private Eyes
1982	"Maneater"	1	78	18	14	4	4	18	4	5	6	RIAA: Gold; BPI: 2× Platinum; MC: Gold; RMNZ: 2× Platinum	H_{2}O
1983	"One on One"	7	8	—	4	77	6	—	21	—	63		H_{2}O
1983	"Family Man"	6	81	—	36	49	—	—	—	—	15		H_{2}O
1983	"Italian Girls"	—	—	—	—	—	24	—	—	—	—		H_{2}O
1983	"Jingle Bell Rock"	— (Note: "Jingle Bell Rock" did not enter on the Hot 100, but peaked at number 30 on the Hot 100 Recurrents chart on January 1, 2005, it also reached number 6 on the Billboard's Holiday Airplay chart on December 13, 2008 and number 24 on the Hot Holiday Songs chart on December 10, 2011.)	—	—	—	32	—	30	20	68	80	ARIA: Platinum; BPI: Silver; RMNZ: Platinum	non-album single
1983	"Say It Isn't So"	2	45	1	8	24	18	—	18	—	69		Rock 'n Soul Part 1
1984	"Adult Education"	8	—	21	—	94	18	7	—	—	63		Rock 'n Soul Part 1
1984	"Out of Touch"	1	24	1	8	11	5	33	27	20	48	BPI: Gold; MC: Gold; RMNZ: Platinum	Big Bam Boom
1985	"Method of Modern Love"	5	21	15	18	56	7	—	—	—	21		Big Bam Boom
1985	"Some Things Are Better Left Unsaid"	18	85	—	17	—	23	—	—	—	—		Big Bam Boom
1985	"Possession Obsession"	30	69	20	8	—	42	—	—	—	—		Big Bam Boom
1985	"A Nite at the Apollo Live! The Way You Do the Things You Do/My Girl" (with David Ruffin and Eddie Kendricks)	20	40	—	12	81	35	—	—	—	58		Live at the Apollo
1988	"Everything Your Heart Desires"	3	13	—	2	75	6	50	28	—	81		Ooh Yeah!
1988	"Missed Opportunity"	29	68	—	8	—	13	—	—	—	—		Ooh Yeah!
1988	"Downtown Life"	31	—	—	—	—	53	—	—	—	—		Ooh Yeah!
1988	"Talking All Night"	—	—	—	—	—	—	—	—	—	—		Ooh Yeah!
1989	"Love Train"	—	—	—	—	—	—	—	—	—	—		Earth Girls Are Easy (soundtrack)
1990	"So Close"	11	—	—	6	106	4	—	—	—	69		Change of Season
1991	"Don't Hold Back Your Love"	41	—	—	4	—	10	—	—	—	—		Change of Season
1991	"Everywhere I Look"	—	—	—	—	—	—	—	—	—	74		Change of Season
1991	"Starting All Over Again"	—	—	—	10	—	14	—	—	—	—		Change of Season
1997	"Promise Ain't Enough"	—	—	—	6	—	29	100	—	—	—		Marigold Sky
1998	"Romeo Is Bleeding"	—	—	—	—	—	—	—	—	—	—		Marigold Sky
1998	"The Sky Is Falling"	—	—	—	26	—	—	—	—	—	144		Marigold Sky
1998	"Hold On to Yourself"	—	—	—	—	—	—	—	—	—	—		Marigold Sky
1998	"Throw the Roses Away"	—	—	—	—	—	—	—	—	—	—		Marigold Sky
2001	"I Can't Go for That (No Can Do)" (remix)	—	—	—	—	—	—	—	—	—	163		The Essential Collection
2002	"Private Eyes" (re-release)	—	—	—	—	—	—	—	—	—	—		The Essential Collection
2002	"Do It for Love"	114	—	—	1	—	—	—	—	—	143		Do It for Love
2002	"Forever for You"	—	—	—	7	—	—	—	—	—	—		Do It for Love
2003	"Man on a Mission"	—	—	—	16	—	—	—	—	—	—		Do It for Love
2003	"Someday We'll Know" (with Todd Rundgren)	—	—	—	—	—	—	—	—	—	—		Do It for Love
2003	"Intuition"	—	—	40	—	—	—	—	—	—	—		Do It for Love
2003	"Getaway Car"	—	—	—	21	—	—	—	—	—	—		Do It for Love
2004	"I'll Be Around"	97	—	—	6	—	60	—	—	—	—		Our Kind of Soul
2004	"Without You"	—	—	—	—	—	—	—	—	—	—		Our Kind of Soul
2005	"I Can Dream About You"	—	—	—	—	—	—	—	—	—	122		Our Kind of Soul
2005	"Ooh Child"	—	—	—	19	—	—	—	—	—	—		Our Kind of Soul
2005	"Let Love Take Control"	—	—	—	—	—	—	—	—	—	—		Our Kind of Soul
2006	"It Came Upon a Midnight Clear"	—	—	—	1	—	—	—	—	—	—		Home for Christmas
2006	"Home for Christmas"	—	—	—	20	—	—	—	—	—	—		Home for Christmas
2007	"Take Christmas Back"	—	—	—	22	—	—	—	—	—	—		non-album singles
2018	"Philly Forget Me Not" (with Train)	—	—	—	12	—	—	—	—	—	—		non-album singles
"—" denotes a recording that did not chart or was not released in that territory.

=== Guest singles ===
Year	Single	Artist	Peak chart positions		Album
Year	Single	Artist	US	US Country	Album
1984	"The Only Flame in Town"	Elvis Costello	56	—	Goodbye Cruel World
2009	"Sara Smile"	Jimmy Wayne	—	31	Sara Smile
"—" denotes a recording that did not chart or was not released in that territory.

=== Other appearances ===
Year	Song	Album
1989	"Love Train"	Earth Girls Are Easy (Soundtrack)
1991	"Philadelphia Freedom"	Two Rooms: Celebrating the Songs of Elton John & Bernie Taupin
1999	"And That's What Hurts"	Runaway Bride (Music from the Motion Picture)

== Music videos ==
Year	Video	Director
1973	"She's Gone"	Diane Oates
1978	"The Last Time"	John Oates
1979	"Intravino"	Adam Friedman
1979	"Bebop/Drop"	Adam Friedman
1979	"The Woman Comes and Goes"	Adam Friedman
1979	"Wait for Me"	Adam Friedman
1980	"Portable Radio"	Adam Friedman
1980	"How Does It Feel to Be Back?"	John Weaver
1980	"You've Lost That Lovin' Feelin'"	John Weaver
1981	"Kiss on My List"	—N/a
1981	"You Make My Dreams"	Jay Dubin
1981	"Private Eyes"	Jay Dubin
1981	"I Can't Go for That (No Can Do)"	Jay Dubin
1982	"Did It in a Minute"	Jeb Brien
1982	"Your Imagination"	Mick Haggerty
1982	"Maneater"	Mick Haggerty/CD Taylor
1983	"One on One"	Mick Haggerty/CD Taylor
1983	"Family Man"	Mick Haggerty/CD Taylor
1983	"Jingle Bell Rock" (2 versions: One with Hall on vocals and One with Oates on vocals)	Mick Haggerty/CD Taylor
1983	"Say It Isn't So"	Mick Haggerty/CD Taylor
1984	"Adult Education"	Tim Pope
1984	"Out of Touch"	Jeff Stein
1985	"Method of Modern Love"	Jeff Stein
1985	"Some Things Are Better Left Unsaid"	John Jopson/Jeff Stein
1985	"Possession Obsession"	Bob Giraldi
1985	"A Nite at the Apollo Live! The Way You Do the Things You Do/My Girl" (with David Ruffin and Eddie Kendricks)	John Jopson/John Oates
1988	"Everything Your Heart Desires"	Wayne Isham
1988	"Missed Opportunity"	—N/a
1988	"Downtown Life"	Jeremiah Chechik
1989	"Love Train"	Julien Temple
1990	"So Close"	—N/a
1991	"Don't Hold Back Your Love"	Sebastian Copeland
1997	"Promise Ain't Enough"	Steve Carr
2006	"It Came Upon a Midnight Clear"	—N/a
2009	"Sara Smile" (w/ Jimmy Wayne)	Tracie Goudie
