= Ultimate Daryl Hall + John Oates =

Greatest hits album by Daryl Hall & John Oates
- Released: March 16, 2004
- Recorded: 1973–2002
- Genre: Pop rock
- Length: 156:00
- Label: BMG Heritage

Daryl Hall & John Oates chronology
Do It for Love (2003)	Ultimate Daryl Hall + John Oates (2004)	Our Kind of Soul (2004)

Reissue cover
- The Essential Daryl Hall & John Oates cover (2005)

Professional ratings
Review scores
Source	Rating
AllMusic	4.5/5 stars

Ultimate Daryl Hall + John Oates is a 2004 two-CD compilation album by Daryl Hall & John Oates, released by Sony BMG on their Heritage label. It charted at No. 63 on the Billboard 200, remaining in the charts for three weeks. The album was reissued the following year as The Essential Daryl Hall & John Oates. In 2009, Essential was reissued with a bonus disc as a limited edition.

== Track listing ==
Disc one
No.	Title	Writer(s)	Original release	Length
1.	"She's Gone"	Daryl Hall; John Oates	Abandoned Luncheonette, 1973	5:16
2.	"Las Vegas Turnaround (The Stewardess Song)"	Oates	Abandoned Luncheonette	2:59
3.	"When the Morning Comes"	Hall	Abandoned Luncheonette	3:13
4.	"Camellia"	Oates	Daryl Hall & John Oates, 1975	2:49
5.	"Sara Smile"	Hall; Oates	Daryl Hall & John Oates	3:09
6.	"Do What You Want, Be What You Are"	Hall; Oates	Bigger Than Both of Us, 1976	4:35
7.	"Rich Girl"	Hall	Bigger Than Both of Us	2:25
8.	"Back Together Again"	Oates	Bigger Than Both of Us	3:27
9.	"It's a Laugh" (single version)	Hall	Along the Red Ledge, 1978	3:46
10.	"I Don't Wanna Lose You"	Hall; Oates	Along the Red Ledge	3:48
11.	"Wait for Me"	Hall	X-Static, 1979	4:03
12.	"How Does It Feel to Be Back"	Oates	Voices, 1980	4:35
13.	"You've Lost That Lovin' Feelin'"	Barry Mann; Phil Spector; Cynthia Weil	Voices	4:37
14.	"Kiss on My List"	Hall; Janna Allen	Voices	4:26
15.	"You Make My Dreams"	Hall; Oates; Sara Allen	Voices	3:10
16.	"Everytime You Go Away"	Hall	Voices	5:24
17.	"Private Eyes"	Hall; J. Allen; S. Allen; Warren Pash	Private Eyes, 1981	3:37
18.	"I Can't Go for That (No Can Do)"	Hall; Oates; S. Allen	Private Eyes	5:08
19.	"Did It in a Minute"	Hall; J. Allen; S. Allen	Private Eyes	3:37
20.	"Your Imagination"	Hall	Private Eyes	3:33

Disc two
No.	Title	Writer(s)	Original release	Length
1.	"Maneater"	Hall; Oates; S. Allen	H_{2}O, 1982	4:32
2.	"One on One"	Hall	H_{2}O	4:17
3.	"Family Man"	Tim Cross; Rick Fenn; Mike Frye; Mike Oldfield; Morris Pert; Maggie Reilly	H_{2}O	3:27
4.	"Say It Isn't So"	Hall	Rock 'n Soul Part 1, 1983	4:17
5.	"Adult Education" (promotional 12" version)	Hall; Oates; S. Allen	Rock 'n Soul Part 1	4:34
6.	"Out of Touch" (single version)	Hall; Oates	Big Bam Boom, 1984	4:08
7.	"Method of Modern Love"	Hall; J. Allen	Big Bam Boom	5:32
8.	"Some Things Are Better Left Unsaid"	Hall	Big Bam Boom	5:25
9.	"Possession Obsession" (single version)	Hall; Oates; S. Allen	Big Bam Boom	4:07
10.	"Everything Your Heart Desires"	Hall	Ooh Yeah!, 1988	5:01
11.	"Missed Opportunity"	Hall; Oates; S. Allen	Ooh Yeah!	4:47
12.	"Downtown Life"	Hall; Oates; S. Allen; Rick Iantosca	Ooh Yeah!	4:28
13.	"So Close"	Hall; George Green; Jon Bon Jovi; Danny Kortchmar	Change of Season, 1990	4:41
14.	"Don't Hold Back Your Love"	Gerald O'Brien; Richard Page, David Tyson	Change of Season	5:14
15.	"Starting All Over Again"	Phillip A. Mitchell	Change of Season	4:08
16.	"Promise Ain't Enough"	Hall; Oates; Porter Howell; Dwayne O'Brien	Marigold Sky, 1997	5:47
17.	"Do It for Love"	Hall; Oates; Billy Mann; Paul Pesco	VH1 Behind the Music: The Daryl Hall and John Oates Collection, 2002	3:58

The Essential Daryl Hall & John Oates Limited Edition 3.0 disc three
No.	Title	Writer(s)	Original release	Length
1.	"Why Do Lovers Break Each Other's Heart?"	Hall; S. Allen	Beauty on a Back Street, 1977	3:15
2.	"The Last Time"	Hall	Along the Red Ledge	2:53
3.	"Halfway There"	Hall	Change of Season	5:32
4.	"Guessing Games"	Hall; J. Allen	H_{2}O	3:17
5.	"Running from Paradise"	Hall; S. Allen	X-Static	6:36
6.	"All American Girl"	Hall; Oates; S. Allen	Big Bam Boom	4:28
7.	"Someone Like You" (Daryl Hall solo)	Hall	Three Hearts in the Happy Ending Machine, 1986	5:30

== Charts ==
Chart performance for Ultimate Daryl Hall + John Oates
Chart (2004)	Peak position
US Billboard 200	63
US Top R&B/Hip-Hop Albums (Billboard)	98

== Certifications and sales ==
Certifications for Ultimate Daryl Hall + John Oates
Region	Certification	Certified units/sales
United Kingdom (BPI)	Gold	100,000^{‡}
^{‡} Sales+streaming figures based on certification alone.
