= Looking Back – The Best of Daryl Hall + John Oates =

Greatest hits album by Daryl Hall + John Oates
- Released: 1991
- Recorded: 1973–1990
- Genre: Pop rock
- Length: 74:39
- Labels: BMG; RCA; Arista
- Producers: Daryl Hall; John Oates; Arif Mardin; Christopher Bond; Neil Kernon; Bob Clearmountain; Tom "T-Bone" Wolk; Danny Kortchmar; Jon Bon Jovi

Daryl Hall + John Oates chronology
Change of Season (1990)	Looking Back – The Best of Daryl Hall + John Oates (1991)	The Atlantic Collection (1996)

Professional ratings
Review scores
Source	Rating
AllMusic	4/5 stars

Looking Back – The Best of Daryl Hall + John Oates is a compilation album by American pop rock duo Daryl Hall + John Oates. It was released in 1991. It contains tracks from ten Hall & Oates albums spanning 1973's Abandoned Luncheonette to 1990's Change of Season.

== Track listing ==
No.	Title	Writer(s)	Original release	Length
1.	"She's Gone"	Daryl Hall; John Oates	Abandoned Luncheonette, 1973	5:15
2.	"Sara Smile"	Hall; Oates	Daryl Hall & John Oates, 1975	3:07
3.	"Rich Girl"	Hall	Bigger Than Both of Us, 1976	2:24
4.	"Back Together Again"	Oates	Bigger Than Both of Us	3:27
5.	"You've Lost That Lovin' Feeling"	Barry Mann; Phil Spector; Cynthia Weil	Voices, 1980	4:10
6.	"Kiss on My List"	Hall; Janna Allen	Voices	3:53
7.	"Everytime You Go Away"	Hall	Voices	5:23
8.	"Private Eyes"	Hall; Sara Allen; J. Allen; Warren Pash	Private Eyes, 1981	3:38
9.	"I Can't Go for That (No Can Do)"	Hall; Oates; S. Allen	Private Eyes	3:45
10.	"Maneater"	Hall; Oates; S. Allen	H_{2}O, 1982	4:30
11.	"One on One"	Hall	H_{2}O	3:57
12.	"Family Man"	Tim Cross; Rick Fenn; Mike Frye; Mike Oldfield; Morris Pert; Maggie Reilly	H_{2}O	3:27
13.	"Adult Education"	Hall; Oates; S. Allen	Rock 'n Soul Part 1, 1983	4:01
14.	"Out of Touch"	Hall; Oates	Big Bam Boom, 1984	4:23
15.	"Method of Modern Love"	Hall; J. Allen	Big Bam Boom	5:33
16.	"Everything Your Heart Desires"	Hall	Ooh Yeah!, 1988	5:00
17.	"So Close"	Hall; George Green; Jon Bon Jovi; Danny Kortchmar	Change of Season, 1990	4:40
18.	"Starting All Over Again"	Phillip Mitchell	Change of Season	4:07
Total length:				74:39

== Charts ==
Chart (1991)	Peak position
Dutch Albums (Album Top 100)	48
UK Albums (Official Charts)	9

== Certifications ==
Region	Certification	Certified units/sales
United Kingdom (BPI)	Gold	100,000^{^}
^{^} Shipments figures based on certification alone.
