= The Singles (Hall & Oates album) =

2008 greatest hits album by Hall & Oates

Greatest hits album by Hall & Oates
- Released: June 2, 2008
- Recorded: 1973–1988
- Genre: Pop rock
- Length: 77:22
- Labels: Sony BMG; RCA

Hall & Oates chronology
Home for Christmas (2006)	The Singles (2008)	Live at the Troubadour (2008)

The Singles is a compilation album by Hall & Oates, released by Sony BMG and RCA Records on June 2, 2008. It reached No. 29 in the UK Albums Chart, remaining on the chart for three weeks in June 2008.

== Track listing ==
No.	Title	Writer(s)	Original release	Length
1.	"Maneater"	Daryl Hall; John Oates; Sara Allen	H_{2}O, 1982	4:35
2.	"I Can't Go for That (No Can Do)"	Hall; Oates; S. Allen	Private Eyes, 1981	5:11
3.	"She's Gone"	Hall; Oates	Abandoned Luncheonette, 1973	5:16
4.	"Family Man"	Tim Cross; Rick Fenn; Mike Frye; Mike Oldfield; Morris Pert; Maggie Reilly	H_{2}O	3:27
5.	"Out of Touch"	Hall; Oates	Big Bam Boom, 1984	4:23
6.	"Method of Modern Love"	Hall; Janna Allen	Big Bam Boom	5:34
7.	"Private Eyes"	Hall; S. Allen; J. Allen; Warren Pash	Private Eyes	3:38
8.	"Sara Smile"	Hall; Oates	Daryl Hall & John Oates, 1975	3:09
9.	"Wait for Me"	Hall	X-Static, 1979	4:07
10.	"You've Lost That Lovin' Feeling"	Barry Mann; Phil Spector; Cynthia Weil	Voices, 1980	4:38
11.	"Kiss on My List"	Hall; J. Allen	Voices	4:24
12.	"You Make My Dreams"	Hall; Oates; S. Allen	Voices	3:08
13.	"One on One"	Hall	H_{2}O	4:19
14.	"Say It Isn't So"	Hall	Rock 'n Soul Part 1, 1983	4:18
15.	"Adult Education"	Hall; Oates; S. Allen	Rock 'n Soul Part 1	4:36
16.	"Some Things Are Better Left Unsaid"	Hall	Big Bam Boom	5:27
17.	"Everything Your Heart Desires"	Hall	Ooh Yeah!, 1988	5:02
18.	"Rich Girl"	Hall	Bigger Than Both of Us, 1976	2:26
Total length:				77:22

== Certifications ==
Region	Certification	Certified units/sales
United Kingdom (BPI)	Gold	100,000^{‡}
^{‡} Sales+streaming figures based on certification alone.
