= The Very Best of Daryl Hall & John Oates =

2001 greatest hits album by Hall & Oates

The Very Best of Daryl Hall John Oates

Greatest hits album by Hall & Oates
- Released: January 23, 2001
- Recorded: 1975–1984
- Genre: Pop rock
- Length: 74:00
- Label: RCA
- Producers: Daryl Hall; John Oates; Christopher Bond; David Foster; Neil Kernon; Bob Clearmountain

Hall & Oates chronology
Marigold Sky (1997)	The Very Best of Daryl Hall John Oates (2001)	Greatest Hits Live (2001)

Professional ratings
Review scores
Source	Rating
AllMusic	5/5 stars
The Rolling Stone Album Guide	4/5 stars
The Encyclopedia of Popular Music	4/5 stars

The Very Best of Daryl Hall & John Oates is a 2001 compilation album by the duo Hall & Oates, released by RCA Records on January 23, 2001. Assembled from the duo's years with RCA from 1975 to 1984, the compilation features the full-length album versions of most songs rather than their edited single versions. The album reached number 34 on the Billboard 200 and #1 on the Top Pop Catalog Albums Chart.

The album was released on K2 High Definition CD in 2012 and was re-released on vinyl on August 12, 2016.

== Track listing ==
The Very Best of Daryl Hall & John Oates – Standard edition
No.	Title	Writer(s)	Producer	Length
1.	"Sara Smile" (from Daryl Hall & John Oates, 1975)	Daryl Hall; John Oates	Christopher Bond; Hall; Oates	3:07
2.	"Rich Girl" (from Bigger Than Both of Us, 1976)	Hall	Bond	2:23
3.	"It's a Laugh" (from Along the Red Ledge, 1978)	Hall	David Foster	3:38
4.	"Wait for Me" (from X-Static, 1979)	Hall	Foster	3:59
5.	"You've Lost That Lovin' Feeling" (from Voices, 1980)	Barry Mann; Phil Spector; Cynthia Weil	Hall; Oates	4:36
6.	"Kiss on My List" (from Voices)	Hall; Janna Allen	Hall; Oates	3:48
7.	"You Make My Dreams" (from Voices)	Hall; Oates; Sara Allen	Hall; Oates	3:10
8.	"Private Eyes" (from Private Eyes, 1981)	Hall; J. Allen; S. Allen; Warren Pash	Hall; Neil Kernon	3:29
9.	"I Can't Go for That (No Can Do)" (from Private Eyes)	Hall; Oates; S. Allen	Hall; Oates	3:39
10.	"Did It in a Minute" (from Private Eyes)	Hall; Oates; S. Allen	Hall; Oates; Kernon	3:37
11.	"Maneater" (from H_{2}O, 1982)	Hall; Oates; S. Allen	Hall; Oates; Kernon	4:34
12.	"One on One" (from H_{2}O)	Hall	Hall; Oates; Kernon	4:28
13.	"Family Man" (from H_{2}O)	Tim Cross; Rick Fenn; Mike Frye; Mike Oldfield; Morris Pert; Maggie Reilly	Hall; Oates; Kernon	3:25
14.	"Say It Isn't So" (from Rock 'n Soul Part 1, 1983)	Hall	Hall; Oates; Bob Clearmountain	4:17
15.	"Adult Education" (promotional 12-inch) (from Rock 'n Soul Part 1)	Hall; Oates; S. Allen	Hall; Oates; Clearmountain	4:34
16.	"Out of Touch" (from Big Bam Boom, 1984)	Hall; Oates	Hall; Oates; Clearmountain	3:55
17.	"Method of Modern Love" (from Big Bam Boom)	Hall; J. Allen	Hall; Oates; Clearmountain	5:27
18.	"Some Things Are Better Left Unsaid" (from Big Bam Boom)	Hall	Hall; Oates; Clearmountain	5:23
Total length:				74:00

== Chart performance ==
The compilation entered the Catalog Albums chart twice, the first time peaking at number 43 on January 22, 2011, and the second reaching number one on May 2, 2015.

In 2012, after Amazon reduced the price of the compilation, sales increased by 758% with 10,000 copies sold and re-entered on the Billboard 200 and Digital Albums charts at numbers 34 and 14, respectively, for the week ending June 23, 2012, making it the highest-charting album on the Billboard 200 for the duo and first top 40 set since 1988 when Ooh Yeah! peaked at No. 24.

When the album was released on vinyl in 2016, it re-entered the Billboard 200, Top Pop Catalog Albums, and Vinyl Albums charts at numbers 124, 10 and 16, respectively.

The album was certified Platinum by the RIAA on August 28, 2015, denoting shipments of one million.

== Credits ==
- Audio Restoration – Bill Lacey
- Compilation Producer – Paul Williams (14)
- Co-producer – Bob Clearmountain (tracks: 14, 15), Neil Kernon (tracks: 8, 10, 11, 12, 13)
- Digital Transfers – Mike Hartry
- Mixed By – Hugh Padgham (tracks: 11 to 13)
- Producer – Bob Clearmountain (tracks: 16 to 18), Christopher Bond (tracks: 1, 2), Daryl Hall (tracks: 1, 4 to 18), David Foster (tracks: 3), John Oates (tracks: 1, 5 to 18)
- Project Manager: Victoria Sarro

== Charts and certifications ==
=== Weekly charts ===
2011 weekly chart performance for The Very Best of Daryl Hall & John Oates
Chart (2011)	Peak position
US Top Catalog Albums (Billboard)	43

2012 weekly chart performance for The Very Best of Daryl Hall & John Oates
Chart (2012)	Peak position
US Billboard 200	34

2015 weekly chart performance for The Very Best of Daryl Hall & John Oates
Chart (2015)	Peak position
US Top Catalog Albums (Billboard)	1

=== Year-end charts ===
Year-end chart performance for The Very Best of Daryl Hall & John Oates
Chart	Year	Position
US Billboard 200	2020	161
US Billboard 200	2021	159
US Billboard 200	2022	188
US Billboard 200	2023	165
US Billboard 200	2024	106

=== Certifications ===
Certifications for The Very Best of Daryl Hall & John Oates
Region	Certification	Certified units/sales
United Kingdom (BPI)	Gold	100,000^{‡}
United States (RIAA)	Platinum	1,000,000^{^}
^{^} Shipments figures based on certification alone.^{‡} Sales+streaming figures based on certification alone.
