= Greatest Hits Live (Hall & Oates album) =

Live album by Daryl Hall & John Oates
- Released: November 6, 2001
- Recorded: April 23, 1982
- Venues: Baltimore Civic Center, Baltimore, MD
- Genre: Pop rock
- Length: 65:23
- Label: RCA
- Producers: Daryl Hall; John Oates
- Compilers: Paul Williams; Jeremy Holiday

Daryl Hall & John Oates chronology
| The Very Best of Daryl Hall & John Oates (2001) | Greatest Hits Live (2001) | VH1 Behind the Music: The Daryl Hall and John Oates Collection (2002) |

Greatest Hits Live is a live album by Hall & Oates. Recorded live at the Baltimore Civic Center in Baltimore, Maryland, the album was released by RCA Records on November 6, 2001.

== Reception ==
Recorded during their 1982 tour to promote the album Private Eyes, Stephen Thomas Erlewine of AllMusic says Greatest Hits Live is "a snapshot of an underrated band on-stage at their peak" and "an entertaining sidenote in their catalog."

== Track listing ==
| No. | Title | Writer(s) | Length |
|---|---|---|---|
| 1. | "Did It in a Minute" | Daryl Hall; Janna Allen; Sara Allen | 3:55 |
| 2. | "How Does It Feel to Be Back" | John Oates | 4:40 |
| 3. | "Diddy Doo Wop (I Hear the Voices)" | Hall; Oates | 3:45 |
| 4. | "Mano a Mano" | Oates | 3:52 |
| 5. | "Rich Girl" | Hall | 3:10 |
| 6. | "She's Gone" | Hall; Oates | 5:22 |
| 7. | "Kiss on My List" | Hall; Janna Allen | 4:42 |
| 8. | "I Can't Go for That (No Can Do)" | Hall; Oates; Sara Allen | 6:45 |
| 9. | "Sara Smile" | Hall | 6:08 |
| 10. | "Wait for Me" | Hall | 5:46 |
| 11. | "Private Eyes" | Hall; J. Allen; S. Allen; Warren Pash | 3:20 |
| 12. | "You've Lost that Lovin' Feeling" | Barry Mann; Phil Spector; Cynthia Weil | 5:33 |
| 13. | "You Make My Dreams" | Hall; Oates; S. Allen | 4:02 |
| 14. | "United State" | Hall; Oates | 4:23 |
| Total length: | | | 65:23 |

== Personnel ==
- Producers – Daryl Hall and John Oates
- Compilation – Paul Williams and Jeremy Holiday for House of Hist Productions. Ltd
- Mastering – Bill Lacey at Digital Sound & Picture (New York City)
- Digital Transfers – Mike Hartry
- Project Director – Victoria Sarro
- Photography – Sam Emerson
- Art direction and design – JAJ Associates

The Band

- Daryl Hall – vocals, keyboards, guitars
- John Oates – vocals, guitars
- G. E. Smith – lead guitars, backing vocals
- Tom "T-Bone" Wolk – bass guitar, backing vocals
- Mickey Curry – drums
- Charles DeChant – saxophones, keyboards, backing vocals
- Larry Fast – keyboards
