= No Goodbyes (album) =

1977 compilation album by Hall & Oates

Compilation album by Daryl Hall & John Oates
- Released: February 18, 1977
- Recorded: 1972–74
- Genres: Pop; soft rock; blue-eyed soul
- Length: 35:48
- Label: Atlantic
- Producers: Arif Mardin; Todd Rundgren

Daryl Hall & John Oates chronology
Bigger Than Both of Us (1976)	No Goodbyes (1977)	Beauty on a Back Street (1977)

Professional ratings
Review scores
Source	Rating
AllMusic	2/5 stars
Christgau's Record Guide	B+

No Goodbyes is a 1977 compilation album by Daryl Hall & John Oates. It is a "Best of" compilation of their first three Atlantic Records albums. It was released after the duo left Atlantic and joined RCA Records, and after Atlantic had achieved a Top 10 hit with a re-release of "She's Gone" (included here). It contains three new songs: "It's Uncanny," "I Want to Know You for a Long Time," and "Love You Like a Brother." The latter two of these were later released on The Atlantic Collection.

"It's Uncanny" was released as a single upon this album's release but failed to break the Billboard Top 40, reaching only #80. "Love You Like a Brother" was re-released on the 2009 four-disc box set Do What You Want, Be What You Are, as was "It's Uncanny." "It's Uncanny" was originally recorded in 1973 and "I Want to Know You for a Long Time" and "Love You Like a Brother" in 1974.

== Track listing ==
All tracks are written by Daryl Hall, except where noted.

Side one
No.	Title	Writer(s)	Original release	Length
1.	"It's Uncanny"		Previously unreleased, 1973	3:43
2.	"I Want to Know You for a Long Time"		Previously unreleased, 1973	3:17
3.	Untitled (Can't Stop the Music (He Played It Much Too Long))	John Oates	War Babies, 1974	2:49
4.	"Love You Like a Brother"	Hall; Oates	Previously unreleased, 1973	3:20
5.	"Las Vegas Turnaround (The Stewardess Song)"	Oates	Abandoned Luncheonette, 1973	2:57

Side two
No.	Title	Writer(s)	Original release	Length
6.	"She's Gone"	Hall; Oates	Abandoned Luncheonette	5:15
7.	"Lilly (Are You Happy)"	Hall; Oates	Whole Oats, 1972	4:10
8.	"When the Morning Comes"		Abandoned Luncheonette	3:12
9.	"Beanie G. and the Rose Tattoo"		War Babies	3:00
10.	"70's Scenario"		War Babies	3:57
Total length:				35:48

== Personnel ==
- Compilation & coordination – John Kalodner
- Produced by Daryl Hall (1, 2), John Oates (1, 2), Arif Mardin (1, 2, 4–8), and Todd Rundgren (3, 9, 10)
- Engineered and supervised by Todd Rundgren (3, 9, 10)
- Recording & assisting engineers – Gene Paul, Lew Hahn, Jimmy Douglass, Joel Kerr, Alan Ade, Gene Perly, and David LaSage (1, 2, 4–8)
- Production assistant – Christopher Bond (5, 6, 8)
- Photography – Benno Friedman
- Art direction – Bob Defrin
- Management & direction – Tommy Mottola
