= Livetime =

1978 live album by Hall & Oates

Live album by Daryl Hall & John Oates
- Released: May 16, 1978
- Recorded: December 8, 1977
- Venues: Hersheypark Arena (Hershey, PA)
- Genre: Pop rock
- Length: 38:50
- Label: RCA Victor
- Producers: Mark Pines; Bernard Yervanian

Daryl Hall & John Oates chronology
Beauty on a Back Street (1977)	Livetime (1978)	Along the Red Ledge (1978)

Professional ratings
Review scores
Source	Rating
AllMusic	2/5 stars

Livetime is a live album by musical duo Daryl Hall & John Oates, released by RCA Victor on May 16, 1978. The concert was recorded on December 8, 1977, at Hersheypark Arena in Hershey, Pennsylvania - not far from Pottstown, Pennsylvania, where Hall lived during his teenage years. Former Elton John Band members Caleb Quaye, Kenny Passarelli and Roger Pope were band musicians on this tour.

== Track listing ==
Side one
No.	Title	Writer(s)	Length
1.	"Rich Girl"	Daryl Hall	3:36
2.	"The Emptyness"	John Oates	3:47
3.	"Do What You Want, Be What You Are"	Hall; Oates	6:56
4.	"I'm Just a Kid (Don't Make Me Feel Like a Man)"	Oates	5:29

Side two
No.	Title	Writer(s)	Length
5.	"Sara Smile"	Hall; Oates	8:01
6.	"Abandoned Luncheonette"	Hall	6:08
7.	"Room to Breathe"	Hall; Sara Allen	4:47
Total length:			38:50

== Personnel ==
=== The Band ===
- Daryl Hall – lead vocals (1, 3, 5–7), backing vocals, keyboards
- John Oates – lead vocals (2, 4), backing vocals, guitar
- Kenny Passarelli – bass
- Caleb Quaye – lead guitar
- Roger Pope – drums
- Charles DeChant – saxophone, keyboards, synthesizers, percussion, backing vocals
- David Kent – keyboards, synthesizers, backing vocals

=== Technical ===
- Produced by Mark Pines and Bernard Yervanian
- Mixed by Ed Sprigg and Glenn Orsher
- Assistant remix engineer – John Smith
- Remote engineer – David Hewitt
- Recording supervisor – Robert Zachary
- Cover photography – Larry Alexander
- Lettering design – Kathy Hohl and Paul Olsen
- Management – Tommy Mottola

=== Production crew ===
- Tour production manager – Glenn Orsher
- Stage manager – Keith Brewer
- Stage technician – Glenn Davis
- Band equipment – Joe Franklin
- Sound engineer – Robert Zachary
- Technical director – Jo Ravitch
- Stage monitors – Keith Harewood
- Technician – Phil Gitomer
