= Arkansas (John Oates album) =

Studio album by John Oates
- Released: January 26, 2018
- Recorded: 2017
- Studios: Addiction Sound (Nashville, Tennessee)
- Genres: Folk; Americana; Country
- Length: 33:21
- Label: PS Records
- Producers: John Oates; David Kalmusky

John Oates chronology
John Oates: Live at the Historic Wheeler Opera House (2004)	Arkansas (2018)	Reunion (2024)

Professional ratings
Review scores
Source	Rating
Allmusic	link

Arkansas is a 2018 Americana album by John Oates, who is best known as being part of the rock and soul duo Hall & Oates. The album was originally released on January 26, 2018. It was recorded with a group of Nashville session musicians called the Good Road Band.

The album originally began as a tribute to Oates' idol, American country blues singer and guitarist Mississippi John Hurt. Alongside two new songs by Oates, many of the songs are re-imagined traditional Delta, country blues and ragtime selections, such as Emmett Miller's "Anytime" and Jimmie Rodgers' "Miss the Mississippi and You".

Oates is New York City-born and Philadelphia-raised, but has a deep connection to the Arkansas region. Oates explained to Billboard Magazine, "My uncle Tony, after World War II, moved to Fayetteville, Arkansas and lived there for the rest of his life. I went there to visit him. I stood at night out in the middle of the cotton fields all along the banks of the Mississippi River and it was one of the most beautiful moments that I've ever experienced, with the moonlight shining on the white cotton, and I just thought, 'Man, this is so American, in a way.'"

== Track listing ==
No.	Title	Writer(s)	Original artist(s)	Length
1.	"Anytime"	Herbert Lawson	Eddy Arnold	3:07
2.	"Arkansas"	John Oates		4:21
3.	"My Creole Belle"	Hurt	Mississippi John Hurt	2:16
4.	"Pallet Soft and Low"	Traditional	Various	6:05
5.	"Miss the Mississippi and You"	William Heagney	Crystal Gayle	3:34
6.	"Stack O Lee"	Traditional	Various	2:49
7.	"That'll Never Happen No More"	Traditional; Blake	Blind Blake	3:07
8.	"Dig Back Deep"	Oates		3:55
9.	"Lord Send Me"	Traditional	Various	2.30
10.	"Spike Driver Blues"	Hurt	Mississippi John Hurt	2:09
Total length:				33:21

== Personnel ==
On the sleeve, the album is credited to "John Oates with the Good Road Band".

- John Oates – lead vocals, acoustic guitar, arrangements (1, 4, 6, 9)
- Guthrie Trapp – electric guitar, backing vocals (3)
- Sam Bush – mandolin, backing vocals (2, 3)
- Russ Pahl – pedal steel guitar, backing vocals (3)
- Steve Mackey – bass guitar, backing vocals (3)
- Josh Day – drums, percussion, backing vocals (2, 3)
- Nathaniel Smith – cello, backing vocals (3)
- Wendy Moten – backing vocals (4)

=== Production ===
- John Oates – producer
- David Kamulsky – producer, engineer, mixing, mastering
- Ethan Barrett – assistant engineer
- Cameron Henry – mastering
- Welcome To 1979 (Nashville, Tennessee) – mastering location
- Matthew Grace – cover artwork
- David Abbot – photography
- Jeff Fasano – photography
- Sean Hagwell – photography
- Chris Epting – liner notes
- Sandbox Entertainment – management
