= The Early Years (Hall & Oates album) =

Past Times Behind aka The Early Years

Compilation album by Hall & Oates
- Released: 1977 and onwards
- Label: Chelsea Records, Showcase, ...

In the wake of the Hall & Oates duo's success, a number of compilations have been released over the years focusing on their music from the 1968-1972 period, as recorded by Daryl Hall & John Oates, both solo and as a duo, in their pre-Atlantic years. Sometimes these have been called Philadelphia Demos, most often The Early Years.

Probably the first of these was the 1977 LP Past Times Behind on Chelsea Records (a U.S. label founded by the Wes Farrell Organization). It also took in tracks by Hall's first band Gulliver.

Over the years this collection of tracks has been rereleased under a series of titles, for instance by the UK's Showcase label around 1985-1986. Liner notes on their CD edition, credited to Kevin James, provide little information on the specific source of the songs, opting instead for a generalized history of the artists' meeting at Temple University and of the bands that Hall & Oates played with during the sixties, including The Romeos, The Temptones, The Masters and Gulliver.

Confusingly, several other compilations of this material have been released that were also titled The Early Years, even though the tracklisting wasn't identical.

In the 21st century more comprehensive selections were released by unofficial or semi-official labels, since it seems unclear who owns the rights to this music.

== Track listing ==
This is the tracklisting of the Showcase CD.

1. "Per Kiomen" - 2:39 (Hall/Oates) [Young Ideas Publ./CBS Songs Ltd.]
2. "Past Times Behind" - 3:08 (Oates) [Young Ideas Publ.]
3. "A Lot of Changes Coming" - 3:22 (Hall) [Young Ideas Publ./CBS Songs Ltd.]
4. "In Honor of a Lady" - 2:25 (Hall) [Young Ideas Publ./CBS Songs Ltd.]
5. "Deep River Blues" - 2:41 (Oates) [CBS Songs Ltd.]
6. "If That's What Makes You Happy" - 2:52 (Oates) [Young Ideas Publ./CBS Songs Ltd.]
7. "The Provider" - 2:44 (A. Robinson) [Sanson Antobal Music Co. Inc.]
8. "They Needed Each Other" - 3:45 (Hall) [Young Ideas Publ./CBS Songs Ltd.]
9. "Angelina" - 2:43 (T. Moore) [Double Diamond Music]
10. "I'll Be By" - 3:06 (Oates) [CBS Songs Ltd.]
11. "Seventy" - 3:08 (Moore) [Double Diamond Music]
