= Phunk Shui =

Studio album by John Oates
- Released: August 20, 2002
- Recorded: 2002
- Genres: Pop; rock
- Length: 45:21 (standard release); 57:31 (reissues)
- Labels: Rhythm & Groove Records
- Producers: John Oates; Jed Leiber

John Oates chronology
Phunk Shui (2002)	John Oates: Live at the Historic Wheeler Opera House (2004)

Professional ratings
Review scores
Source	Rating
AllMusic	2.5/5 stars

Phunk Shui (a.k.a. All Good People) is a 2002 rock album by John Oates who is best known as being part of the rock and soul duo Hall & Oates. The album was originally released on August 20, 2002.

The Phunk Shui CD was released four more times, with bonus tracks added each time. On October 29, 2002, a Japanese version added the bonus track "Mona Lisa's Eyes" (this version was released in the United States on May 20, 2003, as All Good People). Two more bonus tracks were added on November 18, 2003, (title changing back to Phunk Shui) for a new USA version ("Time Will Tell" and a live recording of "People Get Ready"). In 2006, a DualDisc version of Phunk Shui was released under the title John Oates Solo – The Album, The Concert. The CD side is the 14-track version of Phunk Shui and the DVD side is John Oates: Live At The Historic Wheeler Opera House; the bonus live CD that accompanied the live DVD is not included.

The album title is a play on the words "funk" and "feng shui".

== Track listing ==
2002 release
No.	Title	Writer(s)	Length
1.	"Color of Love"	John Oates; Jed Leiber	3:58
2.	"It Girl"	Oates; Leiber	4:09
3.	"All Good People"	Oates; Steve Postell	3:22
4.	"Love in a Dangerous Time"	Oates; Arthur Baker; Tommy Faragher	4:06
5.	"Unspoken"	Oates; Keith Follese	3:30
6.	"Soul Slide"	Oates; Postell	3:34
7.	"Go Deep"	Oates; Leiber; Tom "T-Bone" Wolk	5:13
8.	"Little Angel"	Oates	5:03
9.	"Beauty"	Oates; Jamie Rosenberg	3:14
10.	"Phunk Shui"	Oates; Leiber; Joe Pullin	4:33
11.	"Electric Ladyland"	Jimi Hendrix	3:59
Total length:			45:21

2003 reissue bonus tracks
No.	Title	Writer(s)	Length
12.	"Mona Lisa's Eyes"	Oates; Leiber	3:52
13.	"Time Will Tell"	Oates; Leiber	4:14
14.	"People Get Ready" (live)	Curtis Mayfield	3:47
Total length:			57:31

== Personnel ==
Musicians

- John Oates – vocals, guitars
- Jed Leiber – keyboards
- Tom "T-Bone" Wolk – bass, guitars (5, 8, 11, 12)
- Steve Holley – drums, percussion
- The "Blo Notes" – backing vocals

Additional musicians

- Steve Postell – backing vocals (1, 3, 6, 10, 14), guitars (3, 5)
- Jamie Rosenberg – guitars (9)
- Damian Smith – guitars (10)
- Kennard Ramsey – guitars (13)
- Kevin Hupp – drums (3, 9)
- Shawn Pelton – drums (13)
- Michael Olson – percussion (1, 2)
- John Michel – backing vocals (1, 3, 6, 10, 14), percussion (8–10)
- Mo Lipps – trumpet (2)
- Michael Jude – backing vocals (1, 3, 6, 10, 14)
- Leigh Jude – backing vocals (10)
- Claudia Potimkin – backing vocals (10)
- Claire Stasior – backing vocals (10)
- Paris Delane – vocals (14)

=== Production ===
- John Oates – producer, arrangements
- Jed Leiber – producer, arrangements
- Peter Moshay – rhythm track recording, mixing
- Jamie Rosenberg – vocal, guitar and percussion recording
- Todd Goldstein – recording (14)
- Tom Fritze – additional recording (1–11), recording (12, 13)
- Michael Olsen – additional recording (1–11), recording (12, 13)
- Tanner Oates – assistant engineer (1–11)
- Oren Hader – assistant engineer (13)
- Bob Ludwig – mastering at Gateway Mastering (Portland, Maine)
- Art Burrows – design, photography
- Aimee Oates – titles
