= The Atlantic Collection =

1996 compilation album by Hall & Oates

Compilation album by Daryl Hall & John Oates
- Released: January 23, 1996
- Recorded: 1972–1974
- Genre: Pop
- Length: 77:44
- Labels: Rhino; Atlantic

Daryl Hall & John Oates chronology
Looking Back – The Best of Daryl Hall + John Oates (1991)	The Atlantic Collection (1996)	Marigold Sky (1997)

Professional ratings
Review scores
Source	Rating
AllMusic	4.5/5 stars

The Atlantic Collection is a compilation album by Daryl Hall & John Oates, released by Rhino Records on January 23, 1996. While their 1977 compilation No Goodbyes was a collection of the duo's Atlantic Records recordings, this collection provides a more complete picture of that phase of their history. It also contains the previously unreleased (but often bootlegged) track "Past Times Behind", as well as the tracks "It's Uncanny" and "I Want to Know You for a Long Time," which were previously released on No Goodbyes.

== Track listing ==
All tracks are written by Daryl Hall, except where noted.

No.	Title	Writer(s)	Original release	Length
1.	"Goodnight and Goodmorning"	Hall; John Oates	Whole Oats, 1972	3:18
2.	"I'm Sorry"	Hall; Oates	Whole Oats	3:06
3.	"Fall in Philadelphia"		Whole Oats	4:00
4.	"Waterwheel"		Whole Oats	3:55
5.	"Lilly (Are You Happy)"	Hall; Oates	Whole Oats	4:12
6.	"Past Times Behind"	Oates	Previously unreleased	3:07
7.	"When the Morning Comes"		Abandoned Luncheonette, 1973	3:13
8.	"Had I Known You Better Then"	Oates	Abandoned Luncheonette	3:25
9.	"Las Vegas Turnaround (The Stewardess Song)"	Oates	Abandoned Luncheonette	2:58
10.	"She's Gone"	Hall; Oates	Abandoned Luncheonette	5:16
11.	"I'm Just a Kid (Don't Make Me Feel Like a Man)"	Oates	Abandoned Luncheonette	3:19
12.	"Abandoned Luncheonette"		Abandoned Luncheonette	3:56
13.	"Lady Rain"	Hall; Oates	Abandoned Luncheonette	4:26
14.	"Laughing Boy"		Abandoned Luncheonette	3:30
15.	"It's Uncanny"		No Goodbyes, 1977	3:43
16.	"I Want to Know You for a Long Time"		No Goodbyes	3:20
17.	"Can't Stop the Music (He Played It Much Too Long)"	Oates	War Babies, 1974	2:48
18.	"Is It a Star"	Hall; Oates	War Babies	4:47
19.	"Beanie G and the Rose Tattoo"		War Babies	3:02
20.	"You're Much Too Soon"		War Babies	4:09
21.	"70's Scenario"		War Babies	4:02
Total length:				77:44
