= Our Kind of Soul =

2004 studio album by Hall & Oates

Studio album by Daryl Hall & John Oates
- Released: October 26, 2004
- Recorded: 2004
- Studios: A-Pawling Studios (Pawling, New York); Great Divide Studios (Aspen, Colorado); The Clubhouse (Los Angeles, California)
- Genres: Soul; pop
- Length: 69:31
- Label: U-Watch Records
- Producers: Daryl Hall; T-Bone Wolk; Greg Bieck

Daryl Hall & John Oates chronology
Ultimate Daryl Hall + John Oates (2004)	Our Kind of Soul (2004)	Home for Christmas (2006)

Our Kind of Soul is the seventeenth studio album by Daryl Hall & John Oates, released in 2004. The album contains three original tracks and 14 covers of soul hits of the 1960s, 1970s and 1980s. It is mostly acoustic with some electric guitar and synthesizers.

Professional ratings
Review scores
Source	Rating
AllMusic	3/5 stars

== Track listing ==
No.	Title	Writer(s)	Original artist(s)	Length
1.	"Let Love Take Control"	Daryl Hall; John Oates; Billy Mann		3:29
2.	"Standing in the Shadows of Love"	Holland–Dozier–Holland	Four Tops	3:59
3.	"I'll Be Around"	Thom Bell; Phil Hurtt	The Spinners	4:02
4.	"Used to Be My Girl"	Kenny Gamble; Leon Huff	The O'Jays	4:00
5.	"Soul Violins"	Hall; Greg Bieck		4:05
6.	"I Can Dream About You"	Hartman	Dan Hartman	3:16
7.	"Don't Turn Your Back on Me"	Hall		4:50
8.	"Fading Away"	Warren "Pete" Moore; Smokey Robinson; Bobby Rogers	The Temptations	3:39
9.	"Neither One of Us"	Jim Weatherly	Gladys Knight & the Pips	4:19
10.	"After the Dance"	Gaye; Leon Ware	Marvin Gaye	4:11
11.	"Rock Steady"	Franklin	Aretha Franklin	4:04
12.	"Love TKO"	Cecil Womack; Linda Womack; Gip Noble	Teddy Pendergrass	5:20
13.	"What You See Is What You Get"	Anthony Hester	The Dramatics	4:30
14.	"Can't Get Enough of Your Love"	White	Barry White	3:48
15.	"You Are Everything"	Thom Bell; Linda Creed	The Stylistics	3:55
16.	"I'm Still in Love with You"	Green; Al Jackson Jr.; Willie Mitchell	Al Green	4:06
17.	"Ooh Child"	Stan Vincent	Five Stairsteps	3:51
Total length:				69:31

Limited edition bonus track
No.	Title	Writer(s)	Original artist(s)	Length
18.	"Me and Mrs. Jones" (live)	Gamble; Huff; Cary Gilbert	Billy Paul	6:21
Total length:				75:52

European release bonus tracks
No.	Title	Writer(s)	Original artist(s)	Length
18.	"I'll Be Around" (single edit)	Bell; Hurtt	The Spinners	3:26
19.	"I Can Dream About You" (single edit)	Hartman	Dan Hartman	3:33

Japanese release bonus track
No.	Title	Writer(s)	Original artist(s)	Length
18.	"Without You"	Pete Ham; Tom Evans	Badfinger	4:23
Total length:				73:56

== Personnel ==
- Daryl Hall – lead vocals, backing vocals, keyboards, acoustic guitars, string arrangements and conductor (7)
- John Oates – lead vocals, backing vocals, electric guitars
- Greg Bieck – keyboards, synth strings, drum programming, sequencing
- Tom "T-Bone" Wolk – acoustic guitars, electric guitars, bass guitar

Additional personnel

- David Sancious – backing vocals (3), keyboards (4, 8, 11, 16)
- Bobby Eli – electric guitars (3, 4, 12, 14)
- Jeff Catania – electric guitars (6, 8)
- Steve Jordan – drums (6, 8, 11, 14)
- Charles DeChant – horns (8, 11, 16)
- Lenny Pickett – horns (8, 11, 16)
- David Spinozza – string arrangements and conductor (1–6, 8–17)
- Stephanie Cummins – cello (1–4, 7, 17)
- Sarah Hewitt-Roth – cello (1–4, 7, 17)
- Cenovia Cummins – violin (1–4, 7, 17)
- Carol Pool – violin (1–4, 7, 17)
- Robert Shaw – violin (1–4, 7, 17), concertmaster (1–4, 7, 17)

== Production ==
- Daryl Hall – producer, arrangements, liner notes
- T-Bone Wolk – producer, arrangements
- Greg Bieck – producer, arrangements, engineer, mixing
- Sean Price – assistant engineer
- Peter Moshay – additional engineer
- Dave O'Donnell – additional engineer
- Jamie Rosenberg – additional engineer
- Bob Ludwig – mastering at Gateway Mastering (Portland, Maine)
- Art Smith – drum and studio technician
- Kathy Phillips – design coordinator
- Elliot Lewis – cover photography
- Lynn Goldsmith – other photography
- Justin Wilson – other photography
- David Wild – track notes

== Charts ==
Chart (2004)	Peak position
US Independent Albums (Billboard)	3

== Bibliography ==
- Oates, John; Epting, Chris (2017), Change of Seasons: A Memoir (e-Book version), St. Martin's Press, ISBN 978-1-250-08266-4
