= Home for Christmas (Hall & Oates album) =

2006 studio album by Hall & Oates

Studio album by Daryl Hall & John Oates
- Released: October 3, 2006
- Recorded: 2006
- Studios: Studio Five Grand (Harbour Island, Bahamas); Sarm West Studios and Abbey Road Studios (London, UK); A-Pawling Studios (Pawling, New York); Great Divide Studios (Aspen, Colorado)
- Genres: Rock; Christmas
- Length: 50:53
- Label: U-Watch
- Producers: Greg Bieck; Daryl Hall; Tom "T-Bone" Wolk

Daryl Hall & John Oates chronology
Our Kind of Soul (2004)	Home for Christmas (2006)	The Singles (2008)

Professional ratings
Review scores
Source	Rating
AllMusic	3/5 stars

Home for Christmas is the eighteenth and final studio album by Daryl Hall & John Oates, and their only full-length album of Christmas music. It was released in the US on October 3, 2006. A portion of the proceeds of the sale of this album goes to Toys for Tots. It was only available at Trans World Entertainment music stores in 2006, but has since become available at all retail outlets.

Previously, the duo released a promotional only single called "Jingle Bell Rock" in the early 1980s that had each of them separately singing the lead vocals on either side of the 45. The version of "Jingle Bell Rock" on this album is different from those two versions.

This album features two new songs written by Hall & Oates: "No Child Should Ever Cry on Christmas" and "Home for Christmas".

It includes a version of "It Came Upon a Midnight Clear", which became their second number one Adult Contemporary hit.

== Track listing ==
No.	Title	Writer(s)	Length
1.	"Overture / The First Noel"	Rob Mathes; Traditional	6:50
2.	"It Came Upon a Midnight Clear"	Edmund Hamilton Sears; Richard Storrs Willis	4:16
3.	"No Child Should Ever Cry on Christmas"	John Oates	4:03
4.	"Everyday Will Be Like a Holiday"	William Bell; Booker T. Jones	4:38
5.	"Home for Christmas"	Daryl Hall; Greg Bieck; Tom "T-Bone" Wolk	5:09
6.	"Christmas Must Be Tonight"	Robbie Robertson	4:26
7.	"Children, Go Where I Send Thee"	Traditional	4:29
8.	"Mary Had a Baby"	Traditional	5:03
9.	"The Christmas Song"	Mel Tormé; Robert Wells	4:23
10.	"Jingle Bell Rock"	Joe Beal; Jim Boothe	2:09
11.	"O Holy Night" (# "" – 5:27 (Traditional))	Traditional	5:27
Total length:			50:53

Japanese release bonus track
No.	Title	Writer(s)	Length
12.	"One on One" (live)	Hall	6:46
Total length:			57:39

== Personnel ==
- Daryl Hall – lead vocals (1, 2, 4–8, 10, 11), backing vocals, keyboards, acoustic guitars, additional string arrangements (8, 11)
- John Oates – lead vocals (3, 9), backing vocals, acoustic guitars, electric guitars
- Greg Bieck – keyboards, programming
- Rob Mathes – keyboards, acoustic guitars, string arrangements and conductor
- David Sancious – acoustic piano, organ, additional backing vocals
- Michael Payne – additional acoustic guitars, additional electric guitars
- Tom "T-Bone" Wolk – acoustic guitars, electric guitars, bass
- Shawn Pelton – drums
- Matthew Payne – drums
- Charles DeChant – saxophone
- Klyde Jones – additional backing vocals
- The London Session Orchestra – strings
- Gavyn Wright – concertmaster, first violinist
- Isobel Griffiths – string contractor
- Vic Fraiser – librarian
- Lori Casteel – music preparation
- Mike Casteel – music preparation

== Production ==
- Daryl Hall – producer
- T-Bone Wolk – producer
- Greg Bieck – producer, recording, mixing, engineer
- Peter Cobbin – engineer
- Peter Moshay – engineer
- Jamie Rosenberg – engineer
- Louis Jones – assistant engineer
- Taz Mattar – assistant engineer
- Katzutaka Noda – assistant engineer
- Bob Ludwig – mastering at Gateway Mastering (Portland, Maine)
- Michael McCurdy – album cover artwork
- Kathy Phillips – album design, packaging
- Wolfson Entertainment, LLC. – management

== Charts ==
Chart (2006)	Peak position
US Independent Albums (Billboard)	23
