= Alone Too Long (song) =

1975 single by Hall & Oates

Single by Hall & Oates

from the album Daryl Hall & John Oates
- B-side: "Nothing At All"
- Released: November 1975
- Recorded: 1975
- Genre: Blue-eyed soul, soft rock
- Label: RCA Records
- Songwriter(s): John Oates
- Producer(s): Chris Bond; Daryl Hall; John Oates

Hall & Oates singles chronology
| "Camellia" (1975) | "Alone Too Long" (1975) | "Sara Smile" (1976) |

"Alone Too Long" is a song by Hall & Oates and single from their 1975 album Daryl Hall & John Oates. The song features John Oates on lead vocals, and reached number 98 on the Billboard R&B chart in 1975.

Record World called it "a high harmonied track" and "a most pleasing and sensuous effort."

The song is used as the opening theme to the 2013 HBO comedy series Hello Ladies starring Stephen Merchant.
