= She's Gone (Hall & Oates song) =

1973 single by Hall & Oates

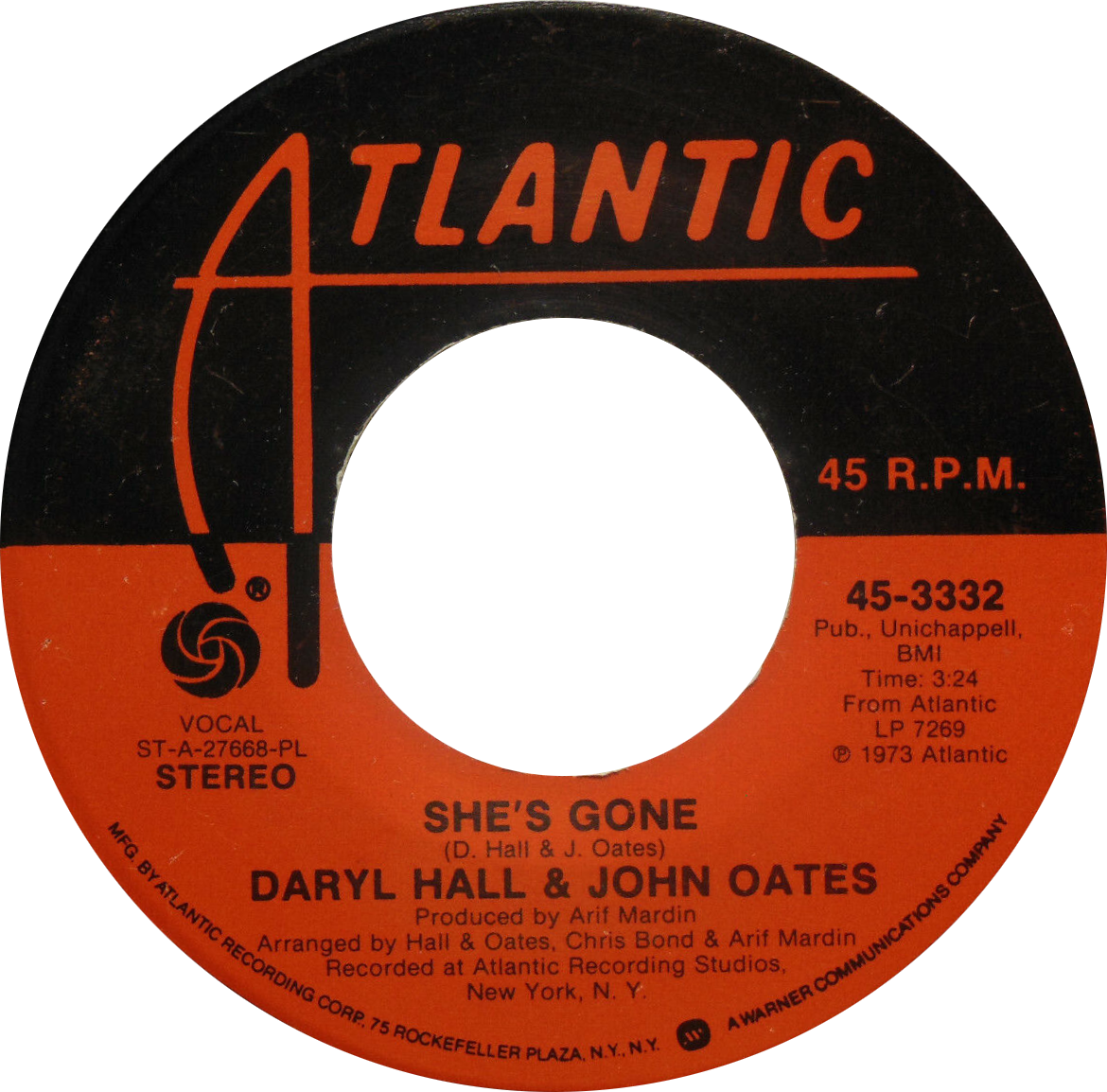
- Side A of the 1976 US reissue (#45-3332)

Single by Hall & Oates

from the album Abandoned Luncheonette
- B-side: "I'm Just a Kid (Don't Make Me Feel Like a Man)"
- Released: November 1973 (re-released July 1976)
- Recorded: April 30, 1973
- Studio: Atlantic Recording Studios (New York City, NY)
- Genre: Soul; Philadelphia soul; R&B
- Length: 3:24 (single version); 5:15 (album version)
- Label: Atlantic
- Songwriters: Daryl Hall and John Oates
- Producer: Arif Mardin

Hall & Oates singles chronology
"Good Night & Good Morning" (1972)	"She's Gone" (1973)	"When the Morning Comes" (1974)
"Sara Smile" (1976)	"She's Gone (reissue)" (1976)	"Do What You Want, Be What You Are" (1976)

Audio
- "She's Gone" (album version) by Hall & Oates on YouTube

Original single
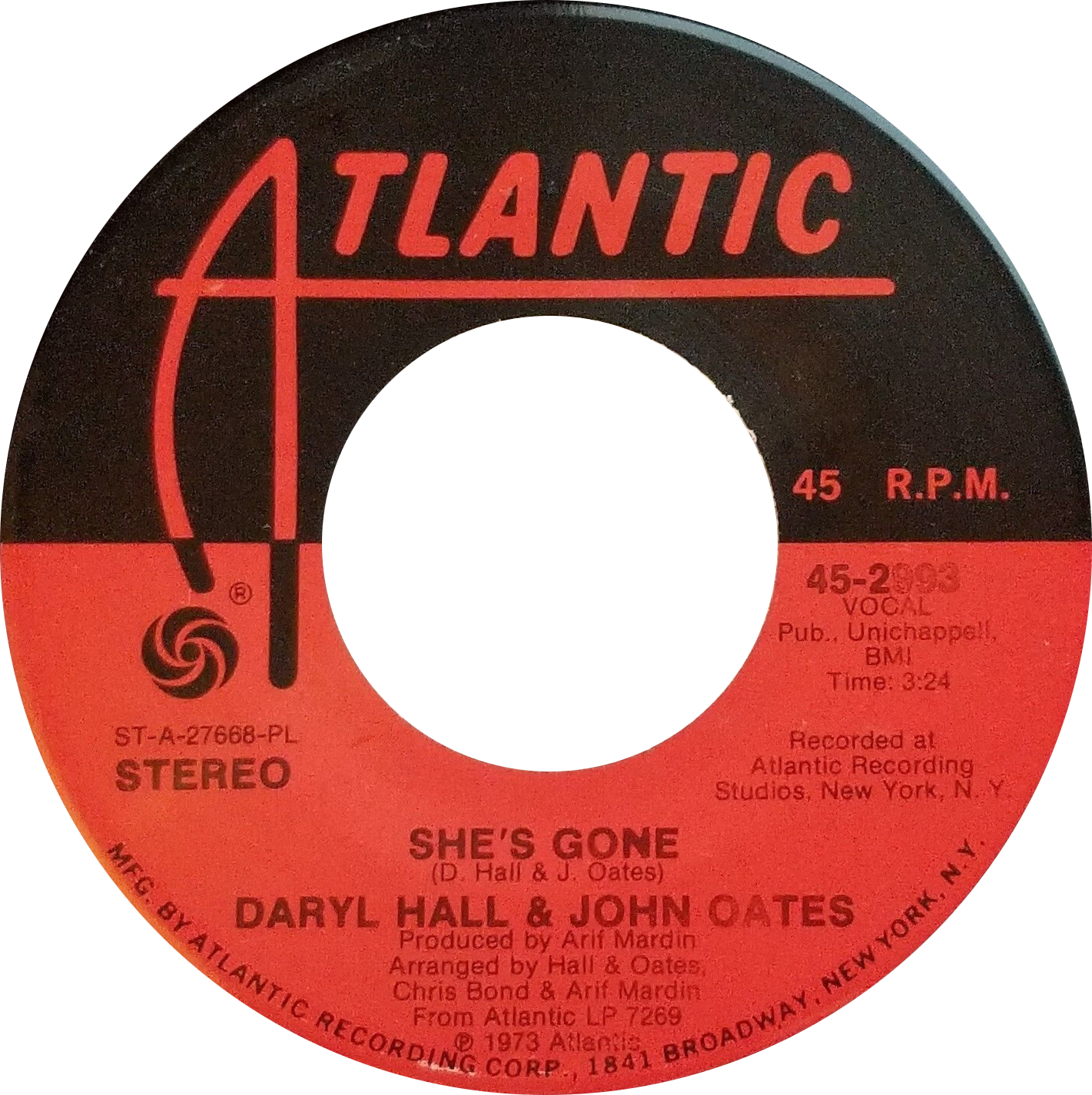
- Side A of original 1973 US single (#45-2993)

"She's Gone" is a song written and originally performed by the American duo Daryl Hall and John Oates. The soul ballad is included on their 1973 album, Abandoned Luncheonette.

It is ranked number 336 on Rolling Stone's list of The 500 Greatest Songs of All Time.

== Background ==
The song was released as a single in 1973 and peaked at No. 60 on the Billboard Hot 100 chart. Nearly three years later in 1976, after Hall & Oates had moved to RCA Records and had scored the hit "Sara Smile", Atlantic Records re-released the original single with a different catalog number (Atlantic 45-3332). This time, "She's Gone" was a hit, peaking at No. 7 on the Billboard Hot 100. On the R&B chart, the song peaked at No. 93. On the Radio & Records airplay chart, the song debuted at No. 37 on the August 13, 1976 issue; after six weeks it reached a peak of No. 8, staying there for three weeks, with four weeks in the top 10 of the chart and thirteen weeks on the chart in total.

The single version is included in Hall & Oates' 1983 greatest hits compilation Rock and Soul Part 1 and the album version is included in numerous other compilations such as The Singles (2008), The Essential (2005), Looking Back: The Best of (1991) but the song is missing on the albums The Very Best of Daryl Hall & John Oates (2001) and Playlist: The Very Best of Daryl Hall & John Oates (2008). The single version differs as it has a shorter opening, the first two verses are cut and combined into one, the saxophone bridge is virtually eliminated, and the song fades out sooner during the big ride-out.

Daryl Hall, according to some reports, has called it the best song he and John Oates wrote together. Both performers were undergoing romantic problems at the time the song was written. A 1985 article in Rolling Stone said the song was about Hall's divorce from wife Bryna Lublin, while VH1's Behind the Music episode on the duo showed Oates explaining it was about a girlfriend that stood him up on New Year's Eve.

John Oates spoke of the song in a 2009 interview with American Songwriter: "I sat down with the guitar and sang the chorus of 'She's Gone' basically the way that it is. Then I played it for Daryl because I didn't have anything else. It just happened. I said, 'Hey, I’ve got this really great chorus.' And we wrote the verses together. 'She’s Gone' is a song that endures."

=== Promotional video ===
To this day, I think (the video) its one of the weirdest and coolest things we’ve ever done. A very bizarre and comical pre-MTV music video that has actually developed a cult following since we released it a few years ago.

— John Oates in his autobiography.

To promote the song, Hall & Oates were asked to lip sync “She’s Gone” for a teenage TV dance show broadcast out of Atlantic City, New Jersey. They refused, because they didn't want to pretend to sing the song. A story was crafted that, they were not available to appear live that day for the show, but that they would be willing to instead videotape something for them to air. They asked if it would be possible to come in and shoot something at their WPVI Philadelphia studio prior to the show.

The promotional video for "She's Gone", directed by John Oates' sister, opens with shots of the "abandoned luncheonette" (see note about Album Cover on Abandoned Luncheonette) in which Hall & Oates sit in recliners, Hall wearing a robe and women's platform sandals, Oates wearing a sleeveless tuxedo shirt and pants and singing the song while a woman in a long dress (played by Sara Allen) and a man dressed in a shiny red devil's costume (played by Randy Hoffman, the band's tour manager) repeatedly walk past the pair. Daryl Hall only lip syncs the portions of the song that he sings in harmony with John Oates during the video (none of the parts where he sings solo), while John Oates does lip sync his solo parts. Towards the end of the video, Oates rises, dons a penguin jacket and proceeds to emulate the song's guitar solo.

John Oates later explained that Hall & Oates had made the video to be shown at a television dance show based in Atlantic City, New Jersey. The duo had initially been asked to perform the song live on the show, but feeling that it was not the right type of song to perform live for the occasion, they decided to lip sync the song in a unique format instead. (In an earlier Oates interview, he insinuated that they were in fact asked to lip sync the performance of the song in a "live" context, but that they were against that idea and opted to create a video to be aired during the broadcast.) According to Oates, the dance show declined to broadcast the video. "The dance show disliked the video, they refused to run the piece, called Atlantic Records and told them that we were insane and would never be allowed on Philadelphia TV again and they also threatened to try and get the record banned on Philadelphia radio stations." John Oates called the video "a timepiece that really illustrates just how experimental we could be." The video was described by Mental Floss as "the craziest Hall & Oates video ever."

== Reception ==
Cash Box described the song as "starting out softly, the build is strong with super strings in the background to tie the package together."

After the song's re-release in 1976, the same magazine describe it as a "beautiful ballad" with the "sweet, high harmony" vocals are "immensely pleasing", and the melody line is "full of hooks, particularly in the chorus."

Record World called it " a fabulous song" and said that "top notch production underscores twosome's solid performance."

== Chart performance ==
=== Weekly singles charts ===
Chart (1974)	Peak position
Canada RPM Top Singles	63
US Billboard Hot 100	60
US Cashbox Top 100	52

Chart (1976)	Peak position
Canada Top Singles (RPM)	7
Canada RPM Adult Contemporary	10
UK Singles (Official Charts)	42
US Billboard Hot 100	7
US Adult Contemporary (Billboard)	6
US Radio & Records CHR/Pop Airplay Chart	8
US Hot Soul Singles (Billboard)	93
US Cash Box Top 100	6

=== Year-end charts ===
Chart (1976)	Rank
Canada Top Singles (RPM)	30
US Billboard Hot 100	80
US Cash Box Top 100	57

== Certifications ==
Certifications for "She's Gone"
Region	Certification	Certified units/sales
New Zealand (RMNZ)	Gold	15,000^{‡}
^{‡} Sales+streaming figures based on certification alone.

== Personnel ==
- Daryl Hall – lead vocals, backing vocals, electric piano
- John Oates – lead vocals, backing vocals, wah-wah guitar
- Joe Farrell – tenor saxophone
- Chris Bond – electric guitar, Mellotron, synthesizer
- Steve "Fontz" Gelfand – bass
- Bernard Purdie – drums
- Ralph MacDonald – percussion
- Arif Mardin – string and horn arrangements

== Other versions ==
Following a recommendation from their co-producer, Dennis Lambert, who heard the Hall & Oates version from the Abandoned Luncheonette album, the American R&B vocal group Tavares covered the song for their album, Hard Core Poetry in 1974. The Tavares version of the song became the group's first #1 hit on the U.S. R&B chart, peaking at No. 50 on the Hot 100.

Dee Dee Bridgewater recorded the song as "He's Gone" on her album for Atlantic Records in 1976. Dee C. Lee (from The Style Council) also covered this version on her 1986 album Shrine.

Before Tavares cut their version, Al Wilson had cut a version. It was intended to be released as a single for him but instead was given to Lou Rawls to record. Wilson ended up having "La La Peace Song" released, which was recorded at the same session. Between the Wilson and Rawls recording sessions, Tavares had their version recorded. Rawls's version peaked at No. 81 on the Billboard Soul chart.

In 1998, English actor and singer Matthew Marsden released his version of the song, featuring Destiny's Child on backing vocals. It reached number 24 on the UK Singles Chart.

== Bibliography ==
- Oates, John (2017), Change of Seasons: A Memoir (E-book version), St. Martin's Press, ISBN 978-1-250-08266-4
