= Marigold Sky =

1997 studio album by Hall & Oates

Studio album by Daryl Hall & John Oates
- Released: September 30, 1997
- Studios: A-Pawling Studios (Pawling); Marion Recording Studios (Fairview); Edison Studios (New York City)
- Genre: Pop-soul
- Length: 57:40
- Label: Push Records
- Producers: Daryl Hall; John Oates; David Bellochio

Daryl Hall & John Oates chronology
The Atlantic Collection (1996)	Marigold Sky (1997)	The Very Best of Daryl Hall & John Oates (2001)

Marigold Sky is the fifteenth studio album by American pop rock duo Daryl Hall & John Oates, released on September 30, 1997, by Push Records. It reached No. 95 on the Billboard 200 and No. 179 on the UK Albums Chart.

Professional ratings
Review scores
Source	Rating
AllMusic	3/5 stars
Chicago Tribune	2.5/4 stars
Entertainment Weekly	C
Rolling Stone	3.5/5 stars

== Background ==
The album features their US Adult Contemporary Top Ten hit, "Promise Ain't Enough", which became one of their biggest hits in some continents notably South America and Southeast Asia. This album also marks their first new release of original material since 1990's Change of Season. It was their first album released as independent artists.

In March 2022, Hall and Oates reissued the album on streaming, vinyl, and CD. The reissue includes three previously unissued bonus tracks.

"I look at 'Marigold Sky' as the lost Hall and Oates album", Daryl Hall said on the reason why they rereleased the said album. "The fans have been asking me for years about it. I'm really proud of these songs and happy to see that it's getting a global re-release", he added. John Oates adds, "I am really pleased that 'Marigold Sky' is finally becoming available around the world. It's a very unique and cool album, and I hope old and new fans really enjoy it."

== Track listing ==
No.	Title	Writer(s)	Length
1.	"Romeo Is Bleeding"	Daryl Hall; Alan Gorrie	5:05
2.	"Marigold Sky"	Hall; John Oates	4:59
3.	"The Sky Is Falling"	Hall; Gorrie; Sara Allen	4:42
4.	"Out of the Blue"	Hall	4:22
5.	"Want To"	Hall; Gorrie; Allen; Tom "T-Bone" Wolk	4:52
6.	"Love Out Loud"	Hall; Gorrie; Allen	3:56
7.	"Throw the Roses Away"	Hall; Gorrie	5:40
8.	"I Don't Think So"	Hall; Gorrie; Allen; David Bellochio	4:05
9.	"Promise Ain't Enough"	Hall; Oates; Porter Howell; Dwayne O'Brien	5:48
10.	"Time Won't Pass Me By"	Hall; Oates; Bellochio	5:12
11.	"Hold on to Yourself"	Hall; Gorrie; Bellochio	4:20
12.	"War of Words"	Oates; Joe Cang	4:39
Total length:			57:40

=== Bonus tracks ===
No.	Title	Writer(s)	Length
13.	"Hold on to Yourself" (Remix)	Hall; Gorrie; Bellochio	4:32
14.	"Promise Ain't Enough" (Unplugged version)	Hall; Oates; Howell; O'Brien	6:06
Total length:			68:39

=== 2022 reissue bonus tracks ===
No.	Title	Writer(s)	Length
13.	"Romeo Is Bleeding" (Radio edit)	Hall; Gorrie	3:25
14.	"Hold on to Yourself" (Remix)	Hall; Gorrie; Bellochio	4:20
15.	"The Sky Is Falling" (Hot mix)	Hall; Gorrie; Allen	4:11
Total length:			69:43

== Personnel ==
=== Musicians ===
- Daryl Hall – lead vocals (1–9), backing vocals, acoustic guitar (1, 2, 5, 6, 10), guitar (4, 8, 10), keyboards (11), percussion programming (11)
- John Oates – lead vocals (9, 12), backing vocals, acoustic guitar (2, 12)
- Dave Bellochio – keyboards, percussion programming, acoustic guitar (3, 4)
- Ken Sebesky – acoustic guitar (1), guitar (1, 3, 9)
- Dave Stewart – guitar (1, 6)
- Paul Pesco – guitar (2, 5, 7, 10–12)
- Tom "T-Bone" Wolk – bass (2–4, 6–9, 12), guitar (3, 4, 6, 8), acoustic guitar (5)
- Shawn Pelton – drums (1–10, 12), percussion (10)
- Peter Moshay – percussion (10)
- Charlie DeChant – saxophone (6, 7, 11)
- Rob Mounsey – string arrangements (3, 4, 7)

=== Technical ===
- Executive producer – Daryl Hall
- Produced by Daryl Hall, Dave Bellochio, and John Oates (2, 9, 12)
- Engineered by Dave Bellochio and Peter Moshay
- Strings recorded by Frank Filipetti (3, 4, 7) at Edison Studios (New York City, New York)
- Mixed by David Leonard (1–8, 10–12), Mick Guzauski (7, 9), and Peter Moshay (10)
- Pro Tools editing – Peter Moshay
- Remixing – Tommy Musto (13)
- Mastered by Bob Ludwig at Gateway Mastering (Portland, Maine)
- Package design – Phillips Design
- Photography – Brad Hitz
