= Beauty on a Back Street =

1977 studio album by Hall & Oates

Studio album by Daryl Hall & John Oates
- Released: October 11, 1977
- Recorded: April–July 1977
- Studio: Sound Labs (Hollywood)
- Genre: Rock
- Length: 36:34
- Label: RCA Victor
- Producer: Christopher Bond

Daryl Hall & John Oates chronology
No Goodbyes (1977)	Beauty on a Back Street (1977)	Livetime (1978)

Professional ratings
Review scores
Source	Rating
AllMusic	3/5 stars
The Rolling Stone Album Guide	3/5 stars

Beauty on a Back Street is the sixth studio album by American pop rock duo Daryl Hall & John Oates, released in 1977 by RCA Records.

== Track listing ==
Side one
No.	Title	Writer(s)	Length
1.	"Don't Change"	Daryl Hall; John Oates; Sara Allen	3:37
2.	"Why Do Lovers Break Each Other's Heart?"	Hall; Allen	3:16
3.	"You Must Be Good for Something"	Hall; Oates	3:32
4.	"The Emptyness"	Oates	3:35
5.	"Love Hurts (Love Heals)"	Oates	3:11

Side two
No.	Title	Writer(s)	Length
6.	"Bigger Than Both of Us"	Hall; Oates	4:31
7.	"Bad Habits and Infections"	Hall	6:03
8.	"Winged Bull"	Hall	4:39
9.	"The Girl Who Used to Be"	Oates	4:10
Total length:			36:34

== Personnel ==
=== Musicians ===
- Daryl Hall – lead vocals (1–3, 6–8), backing vocals, keyboards, Polymoog, mandolins, arrangements
- John Oates – lead vocals (4, 5, 9), backing vocals, rhythm guitars, mando-guitar, electric piano, dulcimer (4), arrangements
- Christopher Bond – lead guitar, 12-string guitar, keyboards, synthesizers, electronic tonalities (8, 9), backing vocals (2–4), arrangements, string arrangements (8), conductor (8)
- Jeff Porcaro – drums, electronic drums
- Gary Coleman – percussion, special effects
- Lee Sklar – bass guitar (1–4, 6–9)
- Jimmy Hughart – 2nd bass guitar (4)
- Scott Edwards – bass guitar (5)
- Tom Scott – tenor saxophone (5, 9)
- Tommy Mottola – backing vocals (3)

=== Technical ===
- Produced by Christopher Bond
- Engineered and mixed by John Mills
- Assistant engineer – Linda Tyler
- Strings recorded by Armin Steiner
- Remixed at the Hit Factory (New York, NY)
- Mastered by Greg Calbi at Sterling Sound (New York, NY)
- Art direction – Dick Smith
- Photography – John Beau
- Secretarial production assistant – Candy Van Duser
- Management and direction – Tommy Mottola
