= Along the Red Ledge =

1978 studio album by Hall & Oates

Studio album by Daryl Hall & John Oates
- Released: August 21, 1978
- Recorded: 1978
- Studios: Davlen (Los Angeles); Sunset Sound (Los Angeles); The Hit Factory (New York City)
- Genres: Pop; rock
- Length: 36:49
- Label: RCA Victor
- Producer: David Foster

Daryl Hall & John Oates chronology
Livetime (1978)	Along the Red Ledge (1978)	X-Static (1979)

Professional ratings
Review scores
Source	Rating
AllMusic	3.5/5 stars
Christgau's Record Guide	B
The Rolling Stone Album Guide	3.5/5 stars

Along the Red Ledge is the seventh studio album by American pop music duo Daryl Hall & John Oates, released on August 21, 1978 by RCA Records. The biggest hit from the album was "It's a Laugh" (U.S. No. 20, Canada No. 23). The follow-up single was "I Don't Wanna Lose You" (U.S. No. 42).

The album foreshadowed what was to come in a few years for the duo, as they shed their previous producer Christopher Bond and went with a more polished sound with David Foster. Along the Red Ledge was the first studio album on which Hall & Oates used their road band (previously they had relied heavily on session musicians), a trend they would carry through their heyday of the early 1980s.

George Harrison played guitar on the track "The Last Time". Other contributors to the album include Rick Nielsen of the band Cheap Trick and rock musician Todd Rundgren. Robert Fripp of King Crimson played on the track "Don't Blame It on Love".

== Track listing ==
Side one
No.	Title	Writer(s)	Length
1.	"It's a Laugh"	Daryl Hall	3:50
2.	"Melody for a Memory"	John Oates	4:54
3.	"The Last Time"	Hall	2:53
4.	"I Don't Wanna Lose You"	Hall; Oates	3:49
5.	"Have I Been Away Too Long"	Hall	4:24

Side two
No.	Title	Writer(s)	Length
6.	"Alley Katz"	Hall; Oates	3:05
7.	"Don't Blame It on Love"	Hall; Oates	3:58
8.	"Serious Music"	Oates; George Bitzer	4:10
9.	"Pleasure Beach"	Oates	3:13
10.	"August Day"	Hall; Sara Allen	3:06
Total length:			36:49

== Personnel ==
=== The Band ===
- Daryl Hall – lead vocals (1–7, 10), backing vocals, keyboards, mandar, hallophone
- John Oates – lead vocals (2, 8, 9), backing vocals, guitars
- Kenny Passarelli – bass
- Caleb Quaye – lead guitar
- Roger Pope – drums
- David Kent – synthesizers, backing vocals
- Charlie DeChant – saxophone
- David Foster – keyboards

==== Additional musicians ====
- George Bitzer – keyboards
- Steve Porcaro – synthesizers, Yamaha CS-80 (8)
- Jay Graydon – guitar
- Todd Rundgren – guitar
- Dick Wagner – guitar
- George Harrison – guitar (3)
- Rick Nielsen – guitar (6)
- Robert Fripp – guitar (7)
- Steve Lukather – guitar (9)
- Les Thompson – harmonica (10)
- Steve Forman – percussion
- Gene Page – string arrangements (4)

=== Technical ===
- Produced by David Foster
- Arranged by Daryl Hall, John Oates, and David Foster
- Engineered by Tom Knox, Humberto Gatica, and Ed Sprigg
- Assistant engineers – Patrick Von Wiegandt, Chris Desmond, Mark Linett, and Jon Smith
- Studio assistant – Glen Davis
- Mixed by Ed Sprigg at the Hit Factory (New York, NY)
- Mastered by Pat Martin at Sterling Sound (New York, NY)
- Cover photography – Eric Kroll
- Cover design – Sara Allen
- Group photography – Barbara Gray
- Art direction – Dick Smith
- Management and direction – Tommy Mottola (Champion Entertainment Organization, Inc.)
