= Bigger Than Both of Us =

1976 studio album by Daryl Hall & John Oates

Studio album by Daryl Hall & John Oates
- Released: August 1976
- Recorded: March–April 1976
- Studios: Cherokee Studios, Hollywood; Sound Labs, Hollywood
- Genres: Rock; soul
- Length: 34:51
- Label: RCA Victor
- Producer: Christopher Bond

Daryl Hall & John Oates chronology
| Daryl Hall & John Oates (1975) | Bigger Than Both of Us (1976) | No Goodbyes (1977) |

Singles from Bigger Than Both of Us
- 1. "Do What You Want, Be What You Are" Released: 1976; 2. "Rich Girl" Released: January 22, 1977; 3. "Back Together Again" Released: April 1977

Bigger Than Both of Us is the fifth studio album by American pop rock duo Daryl Hall & John Oates. The album was released in August 1976, by RCA Records and peaked at #13 on the Billboard Top 200 Albums chart. The album included the first of their six #1 singles on the Billboard Hot 100, "Rich Girl" as well as the singles "Back Together Again" (which reached #28) and "Do What You Want, Be What You Are" (which peaked at #39). Hall & Oates released a song titled "Bigger Than Both of Us" on their Beauty on a Back Street album one year later. "Do What You Want, Be What You Are" was covered by The Dramatics in 1979.

Cash Box said of "Back Together Again" that "A flowing introduction belies the syncopated phrases that are the foundation of this record's layered verses" and that it contains "some striking instrumental effects."

Professional ratings
Review scores
| Source | Rating |
|---|---|
| AllMusic | 2.5/5 stars |
| Christgau's Record Guide | C+ |

== Track listing ==
Side one
| No. | Title | Writer(s) | Length |
|---|---|---|---|
| 1. | "Back Together Again" | John Oates | 3:25 |
| 2. | "Rich Girl" | Daryl Hall | 2:24 |
| 3. | "Crazy Eyes" | Oates | 3:03 |
| 4. | "Do What You Want, Be What You Are" | Hall; Oates | 4:33 |
| 5. | "Kerry" | Hall; Stephen Dees | 3:50 |

Side two
| No. | Title | Writer(s) | Length |
|---|---|---|---|
| 6. | "London Luck & Love" | Hall; Oates; Sara Allen | 3:01 |
| 7. | "Room to Breathe" | Hall; Allen | 4:13 |
| 8. | "You'll Never Learn" | Hall; Oates | 4:14 |
| 9. | "Falling" | Hall | 6:12 |
| Total length: | | | 34:51 |

== Personnel ==
=== Musicians ===
- Daryl Hall – lead vocals (1, 2, 4–7, 9), backing vocals, keyboards, mandola, synthesizer, arrangements
- John Oates – lead vocals (1, 3, 8), backing vocals, guitars, harmonica, arrangements
- Christopher Bond – lead guitars, keyboards, synthesizers, arrangements, string and horn arrangements
- Leland Sklar – bass
- Scotty Edwards – bass
- Ed Greene – drums
- Jim Gordon – drums
- Gary Coleman – percussion
- Tom Hensley – piano
- Tom Scott – saxophone, flute, Lyricon
- Jimmy Getzoff – concertmaster, conductor
- Stephen Dees – co-arrangements (5)
- Slugger Blue – "G kicks" (8)

=== Technical ===
- Produced by Christopher Bond
- Engineered by John Mills and John Arrias
- Strings engineered by Armin Steiner
- Mixed at Sound Labs (Hollywood, CA)
- Mastered by Allen Zentz at Allen Zentz Mastering (San Clemente, CA)
- Cover concept and design – Daryl Hall
- Cover photography – Gribbitt
- Insert photography – Sam Emerson and Kathy Hohl
- Illustration – Ron Barrey
- Secretarial production assistance – Candy Van Deuser
