= Everything Your Heart Desires =

Single by Hall & Oates

from the album Ooh Yeah!
- B-side: "Realove"
- Released: April 16, 1988
- Recorded: Late 1987- Early 1988
- Length: 5:17 (video version); 5:00 (album version); 4:26 (7" version)
- Label: Arista
- Songwriter: Daryl Hall
- Producers: T-Bone Wolk; Hall & Oates

Hall & Oates singles chronology
"A Night at the Apollo" (1985)	"Everything Your Heart Desires" (1988)	"Missed Opportunity" (1988)

Music video
- "Everything Your Heart Desires" on YouTube

"Everything Your Heart Desires" is a song by American duo Hall & Oates, released as the lead single from their thirteenth studio album, Ooh Yeah! (1988). The song peaked at number three in the United States, their sixteenth (and final) top-ten hit on Billboard Hot 100. The 45 version was later included on their greatest hits album Playlist: The Very Best of (2008) while the video mix was included on VH1 Behind the Music: The Daryl Hall and John Oates Collection (2002) and on the box set Do What You Want, Be What You Are: The Music of Daryl Hall & John Oates (2009).

In the lyrics, the singer asks his lover why she wants someone else if she has "everything your heart desires." He explains that if she's happy now, he might really be the one she's looking for.

== Release and reception ==
"Everything Your Heart Desires" entered the US Billboard Hot 100 in April 1988, reached number three in June, and spent 16 weeks on the chart, becoming their last top 10 hit. The song became their biggest hit to date on the Adult Contemporary chart, peaking at number two, a personal best for the duo that would stand until 2002, when "Do It for Love" reached number one. The single reached the top 30 in New Zealand and number 50 in the Netherlands, but it was less commercially successful in the United Kingdom, peaking at number 81.

Rolling Stone music critic Rob Hoerburger notes the song and album demonstrate that Hall & Oates have grown up, adding that the song is "more of a plea than an indictment – no "Maneater" misogyny here."

Cash Box called it "a silky smooth and easy going tune that allows the guys to blend vocally and co-produce a really inviting and accessible track."

== Track listing ==
7" single (US, UK, Germany)

1. "Everything Your Heart Desires" (Hall) – 4:26
2. "Realove" (Hall, Oates) – 5:14

12" single (US)

1. "Everything Your Heart Desires" (54th Street Extended Remix) – 9:12
2. "Everything Your Heart Desires" (If You Want The World Extended Remix) – 7:53
3. "Everything Your Heart Desires" (7th Avenue Remix) – 4:26
4. "Everything Your Heart Desires" (No Words Can Help Dub Mix) – 5:57
5. "Realove" (Hall, Oates) – 4:39

12" single (UK)

1. "Everything Your Heart Desires" (7th Avenue Remix) – 4:26
2. "Everything Your Heart Desires" (No Words Can Help Dub Mix) – 5:57
3. "Realove" (Hall, Oates) – 4:39

== Charts ==
=== Weekly charts ===
Chart (1988)	Peak position
Canada Top Singles (RPM)	6
Italy Airplay (Music & Media)	11
Netherlands (Dutch Top 40 Tipparade)	3
Netherlands (Single Top 100)	50
New Zealand (Recorded Music NZ)	28
UK Singles (Official Charts)	81
US Cash Box Top 100	5
US Billboard Hot 100	3
US Adult Contemporary (Billboard)	2
US Hot R&B/Hip-Hop Songs (Billboard)	13

=== Year-end charts ===
Chart (1988)	Position
United States (Billboard)	72
