= Ooh Yeah! (album) =

1988 studio album by Hall & Oates

Studio album by Daryl Hall & John Oates
- Released: May 2, 1988
- Recorded: 1987–1988
- Studio: The Hit Factory (New York City)
- Genres: Pop; rock
- Length: 49:24
- Label: Arista
- Producers: Daryl Hall; John Oates; Tom "T-Bone" Wolk

Daryl Hall & John Oates chronology
Live at the Apollo (1985)	Ooh Yeah! (1988)	Change of Season (1990)

Singles from Ooh Yeah!
- 1. "Everything Your Heart Desires" Released: April 16, 1988; 2. "Missed Opportunity" Released: July 1988; 3. "Downtown Life" Released: September 1988

Ooh Yeah! is the thirteenth studio album by American pop rock duo Daryl Hall & John Oates, released on May 2, 1988. It was their first studio release in four years and their first with Arista Records. Though the album went platinum in the United States and produced a No. 3 entry with the single "Everything Your Heart Desires", as well as the singles "Missed Opportunity" and "Downtown Life" reaching number 29 and 31 respectively, it charted lower, and sold fewer copies than the band's previous albums. Ooh Yeah! was the last Hall & Oates album to feature Janna Allen as a co-writer before her 1993 death from leukemia.

== Reception ==
Professional ratings
Review scores
Source	Rating
AllMusic	2/5 stars
The Rolling Stone Album Guide	2/5 stars
The Village Voice	C+

Cash Box called "Downtown Life" a "sophisticated and creatively arranged tune, featuring a blistering funk groove combined with a heavy guitar feel."

== Track listing ==
Side one
No.	Title	Writer(s)	Length
1.	"Downtown Life"	Daryl Hall; John Oates; Sara Allen; Rick Iantosca	4:28
2.	"Everything Your Heart Desires"	Hall	5:00
3.	"I'm In Pieces"	Hall; Janna Allen	4:50
4.	"Missed Opportunity"	Hall; Oates; S. Allen	4:47
5.	"Talking All Night"	Hall; Oates	4:34

Side two
No.	Title	Writer(s)	Length
6.	"Rockability"	Hall; Oates; S. Allen	4:45
7.	"Rocket to God"	Hall	5:49
8.	"Soul Love"	Hall; Holly Knight	4:25
9.	"Realove"	Hall; Oates	5:24
10.	"Keep on Pushin' Love"	Oates	5:18
Total length:			49:24

== Personnel ==
=== Musicians ===
- Daryl Hall – lead vocals (1–5, 7–9), backing vocals, synthesizer bass, keyboards, electric guitar, vibraphone
- John Oates – lead vocals (6, 10), backing vocals, synthesizers, guitars, Linn 9000 programming
- Tom "T-Bone" Wolk – bass guitar, synthesizer bass, keyboards, guitars, accordion, vibraphone
- Pat Buchanan – lead and rhythm guitars
- Tony Beard – drums
- Mark Rivera – saxophones
- Jimmy Bralower – drum programming, sequencing
- Sammy Merendino – drum programming, sequencing, timbales
- Jeff Bova – synthesizer programming, sequencing
- Sammy Figueroa – percussion

==== Additional musicians ====
- James Hellman – additional synthesizer programming
- Philippe Saisse – synthesizer programming, keyboards (6, 10)
- Jimmy Rip – guitar (9)
- Paul Pesco – guitar (9)
- Rick Iantosca – tom toms (1)
- Bashiri Johnson – percussion (2)
- Jerry Goodman – electric violin (1)
- Danny Wilensky – saxophone (5)
- Lenny Pickett – saxophone (9)
- Janna Allen – additional backing vocals (6)
- Keisuke Kuwata – vocals (9)
- Narada Michael Walden – additional arrangements (6)

=== Technical ===
- Produced and arranged by Daryl Hall, John Oates, and Tom "T-Bone" Wolk
- Engineered by Mike Scott
- Assistant engineer – Gary Wright
- Mixed by Bob Clearmountain (1, 3, 6, 10), Chris Porter (4, 7, 9), and Mike Scott (2, 5, 8)
- Assistant mixing engineers – Roger Tarkov and Craig Vogel (1, 3, 6, 10); Mark Corbin and Scott Forman (4, 7, 9); Gary Wright (2, 5, 8)
- Mastered by Bob Ludwig at Masterdisk (New York City, NY)
- Technicians – James Hellman (keyboard and MIDI), Mel Terpos (guitar), Mike Klvana (Synclavier and keyboard), Vince Guttman (electronic drum)
- Photography and hand-tinting – Laura Levine
- Art direction – Maude Gilman
- Management and direction – Tommy Mottola (Champion Entertainment Organization)

== Charts ==
=== Weekly charts ===
Weekly chart performance for Ooh Yeah!
Chart (1988)	Peak position
Australian Albums (Australian Music Report)	46
Canada Top Albums/CDs (RPM)	15
Dutch Albums (Album Top 100)	47
European Albums (Music & Media)	78
Finnish Albums (Suomen virallinen lista)	37
German Albums (Offizielle Top 100)	54
Italian Albums (Musica e dischi)	23
New Zealand Albums (RMNZ)	35
Swedish Albums (Sverigetopplistan)	27
UK Albums (Official Charts)	52
US Billboard 200	24
US Top R&B/Hip-Hop Albums (Billboard)	30

=== Year-end charts ===
Year-end chart performance for Ooh Yeah!
Chart (1988)	Position
Canada Top Albums/CDs (RPM)	69
US Billboard 200	93

== Certifications ==
Certifications for Ooh Yeah!
Region	Certification	Certified units/sales
Canada (Music Canada)	Gold	50,000^{^}
United States (RIAA)	Platinum	1,000,000^{^}
^{^} Shipments figures based on certification alone.
