= John Oates =

American musician (born 1948)

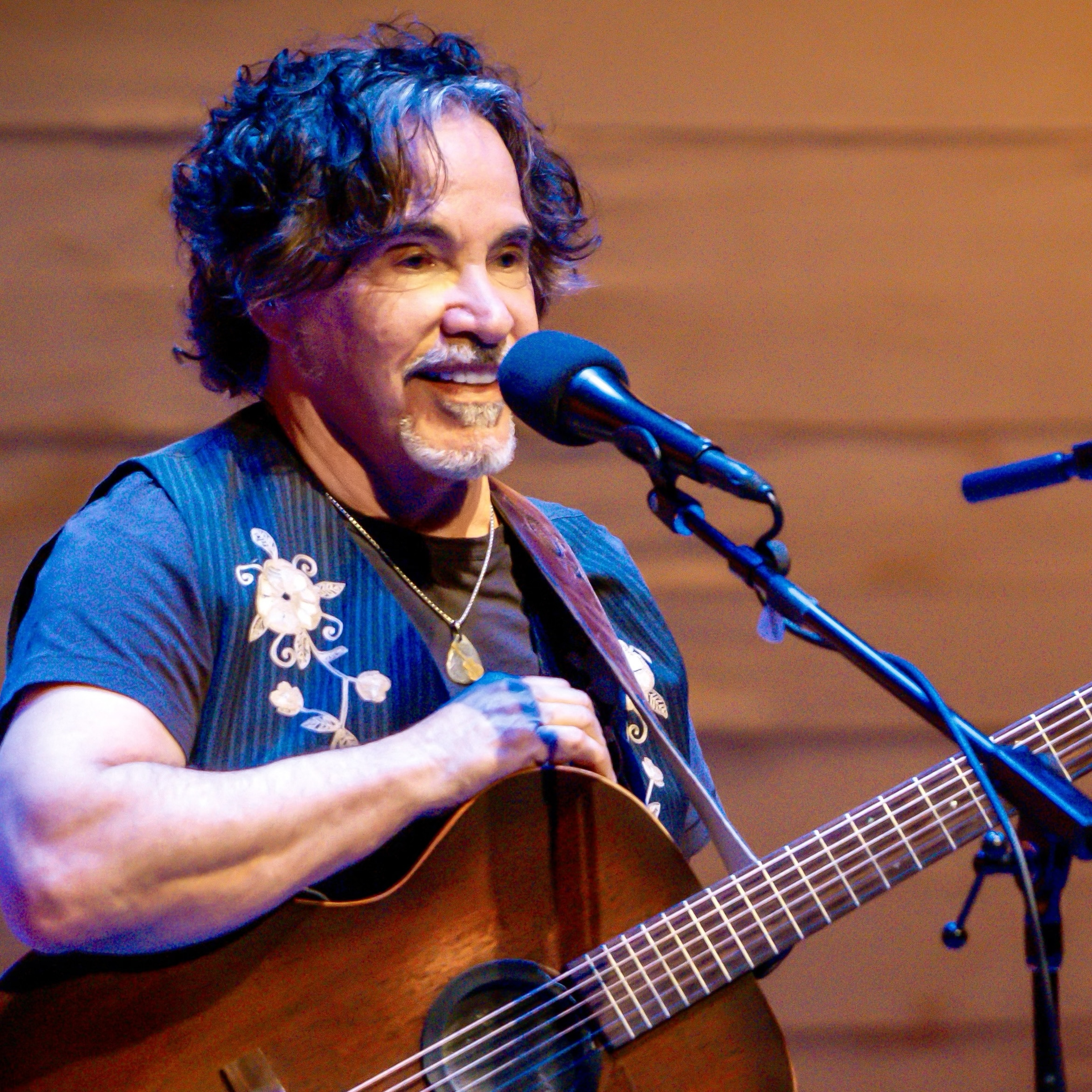
- Oates performing in May 2024

Background information
- Born: John William Oates; April 7, 1948 (age 78); New York City, New York, U.S.
- Origin: North Wales, Pennsylvania, U.S.
- Genres: Blue-eyed soul; pop rock; R&B; soul; Philly soul; soft rock
- Occupations: Musician; songwriter; singer; record producer
- Instruments: Guitar; vocals
- Years active: 1966–present
- Labels: Atlantic; RCA; Epic; Arista; U-Watch; Thirty Tigers
- Formerly of: Daryl Hall & John Oates
- Website: johnoates.com

John William Oates (born April 7, 1948) is an American musician, best known as half of the rock and soul duo Hall & Oates along with Daryl Hall. He has played rock, R&B, and soul music, serving as a guitarist, singer, songwriter, and record producer.

Although Oates' primary role in the duo was being the guitarist, he also co-wrote many of the top 10 songs that they recorded, including: "Sara Smile" (referring to Hall's then-girlfriend, Sara Allen), "She's Gone", and "Out of Touch", as well as "You Make My Dreams", "I Can't Go for That (No Can Do)", "Maneater", and "Adult Education". Oates also sang lead vocals on several more singles in the Hot 100, such as "How Does It Feel to Be Back", "You've Lost That Lovin' Feelin'" (a remake of the 1965 song performed by the Righteous Brothers), and "Possession Obsession". In 1986, he contributed the song "(She's the) Shape of Things to Come" on the soundtrack to the 1986 film About Last Night. He also co-wrote and sang backup on the song "Electric Blue", recorded by the Australian band Icehouse, which was a Billboard top 10 hit.

Oates was inducted into the Songwriters Hall of Fame in 2004, and was inducted into the Rock and Roll Hall of Fame 10 years later as a member of Hall & Oates. His memoir, Change of Seasons, was published in 2017.

== Early life and education ==
Oates was born in New York City on April 7, 1948. His memoir states that his mother was Italian, and his father was a Gibraltarian of mixed background: Spanish, Italian, Portuguese and Moorish (Berber and/or Arab). Oates was raised in North Wales in Montgomery County, Pennsylvania.

Oates attended North Penn High School in Lansdale, Pennsylvania, where he was co-captain of the 1965–66 wrestling team his senior year and was the Section 2 champion in the 127 lb (58 kg) weight class. Oates turned down college wrestling scholarships and opted to attend Temple University in North Philadelphia instead because "it was in the city." He wrestled as a freshman for the Temple Owls and then "got tired of losing weight."

== Career ==
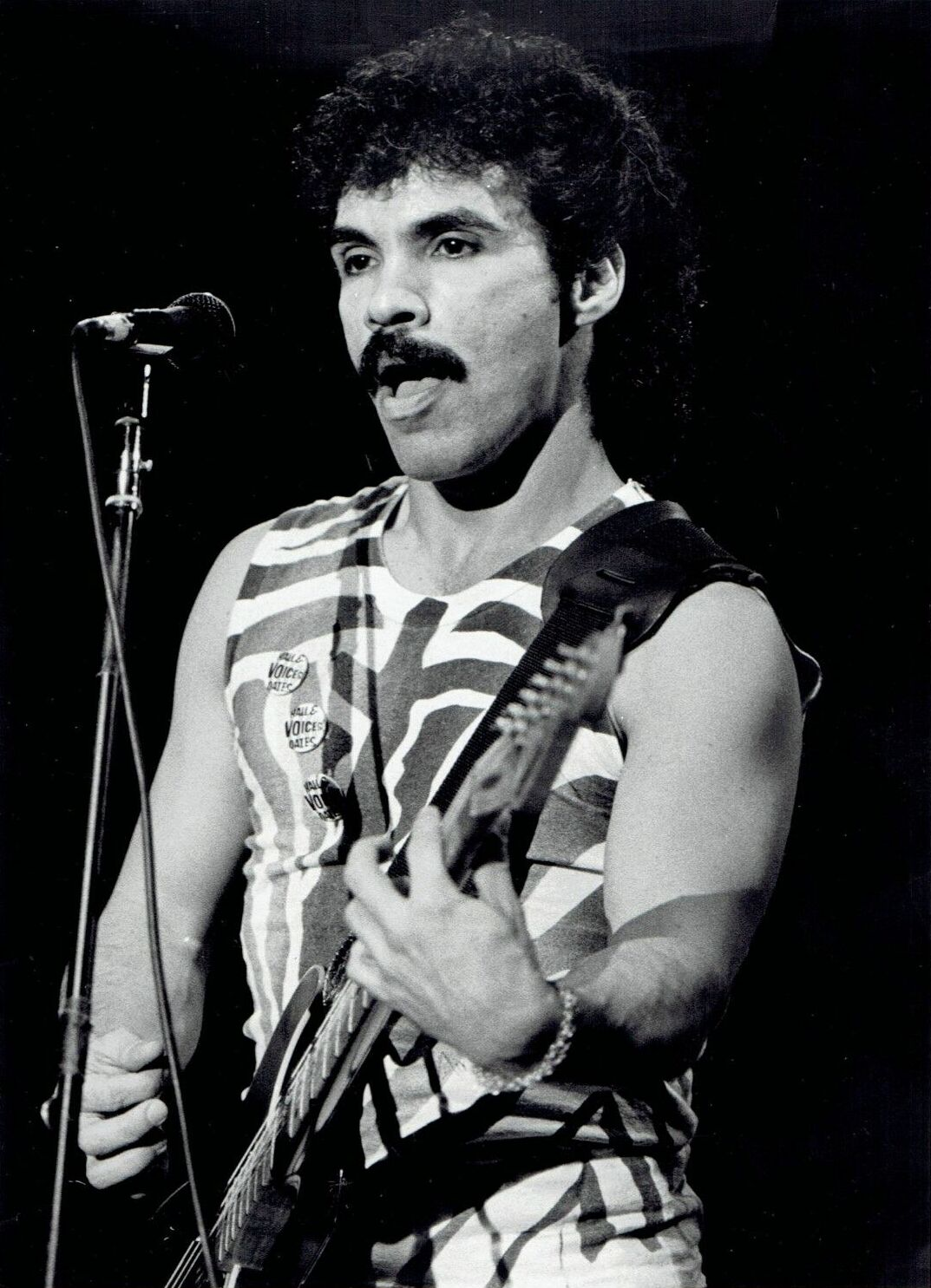
Oates performing in Tampa, Florida, 1982

In 1966, Oates recorded his first single, "I Need Your Love", with a group named The Masters for Philadelphia-based Crimson Records. After graduating from North Penn High School in 1966, Oates enrolled in Temple University in Philadelphia, where he met Daryl Hall, a senior at Temple who was also a professional musician. The two were involved in several college bands, then formed the duo Hall & Oates, and by 1972, they had signed with Atlantic Records. Hall & Oates went on to record 21 albums, which have sold over 80 million units worldwide, making them arguably the most successful duo in pop–rock history. They have scored ten number one records and over 20 Top 40 hits and have toured the world for decades. Their involvement in the original Live Aid concert and the charity single "We Are the World", both in 1985, established them further as artists. Their influence on modern American pop music and considerable contributions have been acknowledged by numerous contemporary bands, including Gym Class Heroes and the Killers.

Despite 30 years as a chart-topping performer and sought-after producer, Oates did not release a solo album until 2002's Phunk Shui.

Oates took part, along with Jamie Cullum, in the song "Greatest Mistake" by Handsome Boy Modeling School. The song appears on the 2004 album White People.

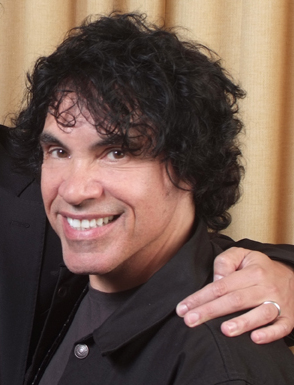
Oates in 2009

As reported by Billboard in 2008, Oates was shopping an animated series titled J-Stache, created by Evan Duby at Primary Wave Music Publishing. His second solo album, 1000 Miles of Life, was released on August 23.

On October 1, 2011, Margo Rey charted at number 24 on Billboard's Adult Contemporary Tracks with the song "Let the Rain", which was co-written by Oates.

On March 11, 2013, Oates released a new single, "Stand Strong", which he co-wrote with Teddy Morgan. "Stand Strong" is part of Good Road to Follow, a set of original songs released as digital singles, one after the other. In 2015, Oates released Another Good Road, a DVD and CD combination via PS Records / Warner Elektra, which also debuted as a television special on the Palladia music channel. The DVD was shot live in a recording studio in Nashville, Tennessee, and features rare footage of his home in Woody Creek, Colorado.

Oates' memoir, Change of Seasons, was co-written with Chris Epting and published on March 28, 2017, by St. Martin's Press.

Oates released an album with his new backing band, The Good Road Band, titled Arkansas, on February 2, 2018. Oates commented that the album serves as a connection back to his pre-Hall & Oates music interest of traditional delta, country blues, and ragtime.

Oates has used many instruments and effects throughout his musical career and endorses several manufacturers and brands. Some of the companies endorsed by Oates include Taylor Guitars, Voyage Air Guitars, Neunaber Audio, LR Baggs, and Fishman.

In November 2023, Daryl Hall sued Oates and filed a temporary restraining order against him, for initially undisclosed reasons. The following week, Hall filed a declaration accusing Oates of "the ultimate partnership betrayal" for planning to sell his share of the duo's publishing to Primary Wave Music. Oates responded that Hall's statements were "inflammatory, outlandish, and inaccurate". Hall and Oates resolved their legal dispute in August 2025, after participating in arbitration.

Also in 2023, Oates competed in season ten of The Masked Singer as "Anteater". He was eliminated during the Group C finals in "Soundtrack of My Life" alongside Keyshia Cole as "Candelabra".

== Personal life ==
Oates was previously married to former model Nancy Hunter. He and his second wife, Aimee, have a son. They split their time between Woody Creek, Colorado, and Nashville, Tennessee.

Oates became friends with Hunter S. Thompson when he moved to Woody Creek in the late 1980s, and the pair maintained a close bond until Thompson's suicide in 2005.

== Discography ==
=== Hall & Oates ===
==== Studio albums ====
| Title | Year |
|---|---|
| Whole Oats | 1972 |
| Abandoned Luncheonette | 1973 |
| War Babies | 1974 |
| Daryl Hall & John Oates | 1975 |
| Bigger Than Both of Us | 1976 |
| Beauty on a Back Street | 1977 |
| Along the Red Ledge | 1978 |
| X-Static | 1979 |
| Voices | 1980 |
| Private Eyes | 1981 |
| H_{2}O | 1982 |
| Big Bam Boom | 1984 |
| Ooh Yeah! | 1988 |
| Change of Season | 1990 |
| Marigold Sky | 1997 |
| Do It for Love | 2003 |
| Our Kind of Soul | 2004 |
| Home for Christmas | 2006 |

==== Live albums ====
| Title | Year |
|---|---|
| Livetime | 1978 |
| Sweet Soul Music | 1984 |
| Live at the Apollo (with David Ruffin and Eddie Kendrick) | 1985 |
| Sara Smile | 1995 |
| Live! | 1998 |
| Limited Edition | 2001 |
| Ecstasy on the Edge | 2001 |
| Greatest Hits Live | 2001 |
| Live in Concert | 2003 |
| Live at the Troubadour | 2008 |
| Live in Dublin | 2015 |

==== Singles ====
| Title | Album | Year |
|---|---|---|
| "Goodnight and Good Morning" (as Whole Oats) | Whole Oats | 1972 |
| "I'm Sorry" | Whole Oats | 1973 |
| "She's Gone" | Abandoned Luncheonette | 1973 |
| "When the Morning Comes" | Abandoned Luncheonette | 1974 |
| "Can't Stop the Music (He Played It Much Too Long)" | War Babies | 1974 |
| "Camellia" | Daryl Hall & John Oates | 1975 |
| "Alone Too Long" | Daryl Hall & John Oates | 1975 |
| "Sara Smile" | Daryl Hall & John Oates | 1976 |
| "She's Gone" (re-release) | Abandoned Luncheonette | 1976 |
| "Do What You Want, Be What You Are" | Bigger Than Both of Us | 1976 |
| "Rich Girl" | Bigger Than Both of Us | 1977 |
| "Back Together Again" | Bigger Than Both of Us | 1977 |
| "It's Uncanny" | No Goodbyes | 1977 |
| "Why Do Lovers (Break Each Other's Heart?)" | Beauty on a Back Street | 1977 |
| "Don't Change" | Beauty on a Back Street | 1977 |
| "It's a Laugh" | Along the Red Ledge | 1978 |
| "I Don't Wanna Lose You" | Along the Red Ledge | 1978 |
| "Wait for Me" | X-Static | 1979 |
| "Portable Radio" | X-Static | 1979 |
| "Who Said the World Was Fair" | X-Static | 1980 |
| "Running from Paradise" | X-Static | 1980 |
| "How Does It Feel to Be Back" | Voices | 1980 |
| "You've Lost That Lovin' Feelin'" | Voices | 1980 |
| "Kiss on My List" | Voices | 1981 |
| "You Make My Dreams" | Voices | 1981 |
| "Private Eyes" | Private Eyes | 1981 |
| "I Can't Go for That (No Can Do)" | Private Eyes | 1981 |
| "Did It in a Minute" | Private Eyes | 1982 |
| "Your Imagination" | Private Eyes | 1982 |
| "Maneater" | H_{2}O | 1982 |
| "One on One" | H_{2}O | 1983 |
| "Family Man" | H_{2}O | 1983 |
| "Italian Girls" | H_{2}O | 1983 |
| "Jingle Bell Rock" | non-album single | 1983 |
| "Say It Isn't So" | Rock 'n' Soul: Part 1 | 1983 |
| "Adult Education" | Rock 'n' Soul: Part 1 | 1984 |
| "Out of Touch" | Big Bam Boom | 1984 |
| "Method of Modern Love" | Big Bam Boom | 1985 |
| "Some Things Are Better Left Unsaid" | Big Bam Boom | 1985 |
| "Possession Obsession" | Big Bam Boom | 1985 |
| "A Nite at the Apollo Live! The Way You Do the Things You Do/My Girl" (with David Ruffin and Eddie Kendricks) | Live at the Apollo | 1985 |
| "Everything Your Heart Desires" | Ooh Yeah! | 1988 |
| "Missed Opportunity" | Ooh Yeah! | 1988 |
| "Downtown Life" | Ooh Yeah! | 1988 |
| "Talking All Night" | Ooh Yeah! | 1988 |
| "Love Train" | Earth Girls Are Easy (soundtrack) | 1989 |
| "So Close" | Change of Season | 1990 |
| "Don't Hold Back Your Love" | Change of Season | 1991 |
| "Everywhere I Look" | Change of Season | 1991 |
| "Starting All Over Again" | Change of Season | 1991 |
| "Promise Ain't Enough" | Marigold Sky | 1997 |
| "Romeo Is Bleeding" | Marigold Sky | 1998 |
| "The Sky Is Falling" | Marigold Sky | 1998 |
| "Hold On to Yourself" | Marigold Sky | 1998 |
| "Throw the Roses Away" | Marigold Sky | 1998 |
| "I Can't Go for That (No Can Do)" (remix) | The Essential Collection | 2001 |
| "Private Eyes" (re-release) | The Essential Collection | 2002 |
| "Do It for Love" | Do It for Love | 2002 |
| "Forever for You" | Do It for Love | 2002 |
| "Man on a Mission" | Do It for Love | 2003 |
| "Someday We'll Know" (with Todd Rundgren) | Do It for Love | 2003 |
| "Intuition" | Do It for Love | 2003 |
| "Getaway Car" | Do It for Love | 2003 |
| "I'll Be Around" | Our Kind of Soul | 2004 |
| "Without You" | Our Kind of Soul | 2004 |
| "I Can Dream About You" | Our Kind of Soul | 2005 |
| "Ooh Child" | Our Kind of Soul | 2005 |
| "Let Love Take Control" | Our Kind of Soul | 2005 |
| "It Came Upon a Midnight Clear" | Home for Christmas | 2006 |
| "Home for Christmas" | Home for Christmas | 2006 |
| "Take Christmas Back" | non-album singles | 2007 |
| "Philly Forget Me Not" (with Train) | non-album singles | 2018 |
| "—" denotes a recording that did not chart or was not released in that territory. | | |

==== Songs with Oates on lead vocals ====
- "All Our Love" (co-lead vocal) from Whole Oats
- "Southeast City Window" from Whole Oats
- "Thank You For ..." from Whole Oats
- "Lilly (Are You Happy)" (co-lead vocal) from Whole Oats
- "Had I Known You Better Then" from Abandoned Luncheonette
- "Las Vegas Turnaround (The Stewardess Song)" from Abandoned Luncheonette
- "She's Gone" (co-lead vocal) from Abandoned Luncheonette
- "I'm Just A Kid (Don't Make Me Feel Like A Man)" from Abandoned Luncheonette
- "Lady Rain" (co-lead vocal) from Abandoned Luncheonette
- "Can't Stop The Music (He Played It Much Too Long)" from War Babies
- "Is it a Star" (co-lead vocal) from War Babies
- "Johnny Gore and the "C" Eaters" (co-lead vocal) from War Babies
- "Past Times Behind" from The Atlantic Collection compilation
- "Camellia" from Daryl Hall & John Oates
- "Alone Too Long" from Daryl Hall & John Oates
- "Soldering" from Daryl Hall & John Oates
- "Ice" from Daryl Hall & John Oates
- "Back Together Again" from Bigger Than Both of Us
- "Crazy Eyes" from Bigger Than Both of Us
- "You'll Never Learn" from Bigger Than Both of Us
- "The Emptyness" from Beauty on a Back Street
- "Love Hurts (Love Heals)" from Beauty on a Back Street
- "The Girl Who Used to Be" from Beauty on a Back Street
- "Melody for a Memory" from Along the Red Ledge
- "Serious Music" from Along the Red Ledge
- "Pleasure Beach" from Along the Red Ledge
- "Portable Radio" (co-lead vocal) from X-Static
- "All You Want Is Heaven" (co-lead vocal) from X-Static
- "Bebop/Drop" from X-Static
- "How Does It Feel To Be Back" from Voices
- "Hard To Be In Love With You" (co-lead vocal) from Voices
- "You've Lost That Lovin' Feelin'" (co-lead vocal) from Voices
- "Africa" from Voices
- "Mano A Mano" from Private Eyes
- "Friday Let Me Down" from Private Eyes
- "Italian Girls" from H2O
- "At Tension" from H2O
- "Jingle Bell Rock" from 1983 Christmas single (flip-side featured another version with lead vocals by Daryl Hall)
- "Possession Obsession" from Big Bam Boom
- "Cold Dark And Yesterday" from Big Bam Boom
- "Rockability" (co-lead vocal) from Ooh Yeah!
- "Keep on Pushin' Love" from Ooh Yeah!
- "Change of Season" (co-lead vocal) from Change of Season
- "Only Love" from Change of Season
- "Starting All Over Again"(co-lead vocal) from Change of Season
- "Time Won't Pass Me By" (co-lead vocal) from Marigold Sky
- "War of Words" from Marigold Sky
- "Someday We'll Know" (co-lead vocal) from Do It for Love
- "Love in a Dangerous Time" from Do It for Love
- "Ooh Child" from Our Kind of Soul
- "Whatcha See Is Whatcha Get" from Our Kind of Soul
- "No Child Should Ever Cry on Christmas" from Home for Christmas
- "The Christmas Song" from Home for Christmas
- "Don't Go Out" from Do What You Want, Be What You Are box set
- "All the Way from Philadelphia" (co-lead vocal) from Do What You Want, Be What You Are box set
- "I Want Someone" (co-lead vocal) from Do What You Want, Be What You Are box set

=== Guest singles ===
| Year | Single | Artist | Peak chart positions | | Album |
| Year | Single | Artist | US | US Country | Album |
|---|---|---|---|---|---|
| 1984 | "The Only Flame in Town" | Elvis Costello | 56 | — | Goodbye Cruel World |
| 2009 | "Sara Smile" | Jimmy Wayne | — | 31 | Sara Smile |

=== Other appearances ===
| Year | Song | Album |
|---|---|---|
| 1989 | "Love Train" | Earth Girls Are Easy (Soundtrack) |
| 1991 | "Philadelphia Freedom" | Two Rooms: Celebrating the Songs of Elton John & Bernie Taupin |
| 1999 | "And That's What Hurts" | Runaway Bride (Music from the Motion Picture) |

=== Solo ===
==== Studio albums ====
| Title | Year |
|---|---|
| Phunk Shui | 2002 |
| 1000 Miles of Life | 2008 |
| Mississippi Mile | 2011 |
| Good Road to Follow | 2014 |
| Arkansas | 2018 |
| Reunion | 2024 |
| Oates | 2025 |

==== Live albums ====
| Title | Year |
|---|---|
| Live at the Historic Wheeler Opera House | 2004 |
| John Oates Solo – The Album, The Concert | 2006 |
| The Bluesville Sessions | 2012 |
| Another Good Road | 2015 |
| Live in Nashville | 2020 |

=== Other appearances ===
| Year | Song | Album |
|---|---|---|
| 1986 | "She's the Shape of Things to Come" | About Last Night (Soundtrack) |
| 2004 | "The Greatest Mistake (with Jamie Cullum)" | White People (album by Handsome Boy Modeling School) |

==== Non-album singles ====
| Title | Year |
|---|---|
| Let's Drive | c.2014 |
| Santa Be Good To Me (featuring the Time Jumpers) | 2016 |
| I Blinked Once (featuring Bekka Bramlett) | 2017 |
| The Christmas Song | 2020 |
| Pushin' a Rock | 2023 |
| Disconnected | 2023 |
| What a Wonderful World | 2023 |
| Why Can't We Live Together | 2023 |
| Maneater (Reggae Version) | 2023 |
| Too Late to Break Your Fall | 2023 |
| Get Your Smile On | 2023 |

== Filmography ==
=== Television ===
| Year | Title | Role | Notes |
|---|---|---|---|
| 1982 | SCTV | Himself | Episode: "Chariots of Eggs" |
| 2002 | Behind the Music | Himself | Episode: "Hall & Oates" |
| 2003 | Ed | Himself | Episode: "Captain Lucidity" |
| 2006 | Will & Grace | Himself | Episode: "The Definition of Marriage" |
| 2009 | The Cleveland Show | Himself (voice) | Episode: "Brown Thanksgiving" |
| 2010 | Behind the Music: Remastered | Himself | Episode: "Hall & Oates" |
| 2011 | The Cleveland Show | Cleveland's Devil (voice) | Episode: "Ship'rect" |
| 2014 | Garfunkel and Oates | Dirty D | Episode: "The Fadeaway" |
