= Rich Girl (Hall & Oates song) =

1977 single by Hall & Oates

Single by Daryl Hall & John Oates

from the album Bigger Than Both of Us
- B-side: "London, Luck and Love"
- Released: January 1977
- Studio: Cherokee (Hollywood, California)
- Genre: Rock; Philadelphia soul; blue-eyed soul; pop
- Length: 2:23
- Label: RCA Victor
- Songwriter: Daryl Hall
- Producer: Christopher Bond

Daryl Hall & John Oates singles chronology
"Do What You Want, Be What You Are" (1976)	"Rich Girl" (1977)	"Back Together Again" (1977)

Audio
- "Rich Girl" on YouTube

"Rich Girl" is a song by Daryl Hall & John Oates. It debuted on the Billboard Top 40 on February 5, 1977, at number 38 and on March 26, 1977, it became their first of six number-one singles on the Billboard Hot 100. The single originally appeared on the 1976 album Bigger Than Both of Us. At the end of 1977, Billboard ranked it as the 23rd biggest hit of the year.

== Content ==
The song's lyrics are about a spoiled girl who can rely on her parents' money to do whatever she wants. The song was rumored to be about the then-scandalous newspaper heiress Patty Hearst. In fact, the title character in the song is based on a spoiled heir to a restaurant chain who was an ex-boyfriend of Daryl Hall's girlfriend, Sara Allen. "But you can't write, 'You're a rich boy' in a song, so I changed it to a girl," Hall told Rolling Stone.

Hall elaborated on the song in an interview with American Songwriter:

"Rich Girl" was written about an old boyfriend of Sara [Allen]'s from college that she was still friends with at the time. His name is Victor Walker. He came to our apartment, and he was acting sort of strange. His father was quite rich. I think he was involved with some kind of a fast-food chain. I said, "This guy is out of his mind, but he doesn't have to worry about it because his father's gonna bail him out of any problems he gets in." So I sat down and wrote that chorus. [Sings] "He can rely on the old man's money/he can rely on the old man's money/he's a rich guy." I thought that didn't sound right, so I changed it to "Rich Girl". He knows the song was written about him.

Several years later, Hall read an interview with serial killer David Berkowitz, in which Berkowitz claimed that "Rich Girl" had motivated him to commit the notorious "Son of Sam" murders (although the song was not released until after the Son of Sam murders had already begun, casting doubts on that suggestion). Hall & Oates later reflected this disturbing fact in the lyrics of the song "Diddy Doo Wop (I Hear the Voices)" on the album Voices.

== Personnel ==
- Daryl Hall – lead vocals, backing vocals, keyboards
- John Oates – backing vocals, rhythm guitars
- Christopher Bond – keyboards
- Scott Edwards – bass
- Jim Gordon – drums
- Gary Coleman – tambourine
- James Getzoff – conductor

== Reception ==
Cash Box wrote that it is "an upbeat, foot-tapping number with a lyric line that really catches on."

== Charts ==
=== Weekly charts ===
Chart (1977)	Peak position
Australia (Kent Music Report)	6
Canada RPM Top Singles	5
Canada RPM Adult Contemporary	45
Netherlands (Dutch Top 40)	18
Netherlands (Single Top 100)	15
New Zealand (Recorded Music NZ)	33
US Billboard Hot 100	1
US Hot Soul Singles (Billboard)	64
US Radio & Records CHR/Pop Airplay Chart	1

=== Year-end charts ===
Chart (1977)	Position
Australia (Kent Music Report)	45
Canada Top Singles (RPM)	50
US Billboard Hot 100	23

== Certifications ==
Region	Certification	Certified units/sales
Denmark (IFPI Danmark)	Gold	45,000^{‡}
New Zealand (RMNZ)	5× Platinum	150,000^{‡}
United Kingdom (BPI)	Platinum	600,000^{‡}
United States (RIAA)	Gold	1,000,000^{^}
^{^} Shipments figures based on certification alone.^{‡} Sales+streaming figures based on certification alone.

== Selwyn version ==
"Rich Girl"

Single by Selwyn

from the album Meant to Be
- B-side: "Way Love's Supposed to Be"
- Released: August 5, 2002
- Length: 3:56
- Label: Epic
- Songwriter: Daryl Hall
- Producers: Audius Mtawarira; Paul Begaud; Tod Deeley

Selwyn singles chronology
"Way Love's Supposed to Be" (2002)	"Rich Girl" (2002)	"Like This, Like That" (2002)

Audio
- "Rich Girl" (Single Mix) on YouTube

Australian R&B singer Selwyn covered "Rich Girl" in 2002. This version discards the second verse but contains two new verses and retains the original chorus. It was included on Selwyn's 2002 debut album, Meant to Be, and released as a single on August 5, 2002. It became a hit in Australia and New Zealand, peaking at number nine in the former country and number 20 in the latter; it is his highest-charting single in both nations. In Australia, it was certified gold and was the 50th-most-successful single of 2002.

=== Track listing ===
Australian maxi-CD

1. "Rich Girl"
2. "Rich Girl" (Rudy mix)
3. "Rich Girl" (Anna Nicole mix)
4. "Way Love's Supposed to Be" (Isaac James edit)

=== Charts ===
==== Weekly charts ====
Chart (2002)	Peak position
Australia (ARIA)	9
Australian Urban (ARIA)	3
New Zealand (Recorded Music NZ)	20

==== Year-end charts ====
Chart (2002)	Position
Australia (ARIA)	50
Australian Artist (ARIA)	7
Australian Urban (ARIA)	19

=== Certifications ===
Region	Certification	Certified units/sales
Australia (ARIA)	Gold	35,000^{^}
^{^} Shipments figures based on certification alone.
