= Sara Smile =

1975 single by Hall & Oates

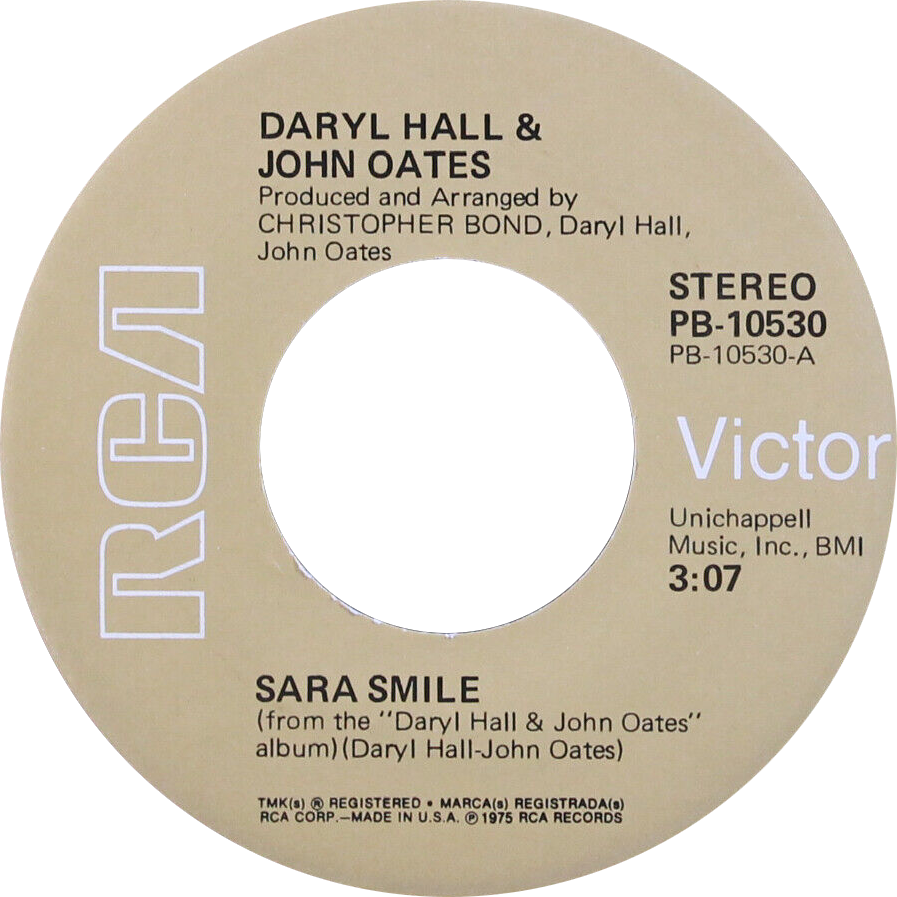
- Side A of the US single

Single by Daryl Hall & John Oates

from the album Daryl Hall & John Oates
- B-side: "Soldering"
- Released: 1975
- Recorded: 1975
- Genre: Soft rock; R&B; soul; blue-eyed soul
- Length: 3:07
- Label: RCA Victor
- Songwriters: Daryl Hall, John Oates
- Producers: Chris Bond, Daryl Hall, John Oates

Daryl Hall & John Oates singles chronology
"Alone Too Long" (1975)	"Sara Smile" (1975)	"She's Gone" (1976)

"Sara Smile" is a song written and recorded by the American musical duo Hall & Oates. It was released as the third single from their album Daryl Hall & John Oates. The song was the group's first top 40 and first top ten hit in the US, reaching number four on the Billboard Hot 100.

== Release and chart performance ==
"Sara Smile" first appeared in August 1975 as the second cut on the RCA Records album Daryl Hall & John Oates. The song was performed by Hall & Oates during their September–November 1975 tour in support of the album, with a reviewer noting that listeners who liked "She's Gone" would also like the softer ballad "Sara Smile". In late 1975, "Sara Smile" was prepared as a 45 rpm 7-inch single release – the third single from the album. It first entered the Billboard Hot 100 chart on January 31, 1976, at number 91.

Cowritten by both halves of the duo, "Sara Smile" turned out to be Hall & Oates' breakthrough single, reaching a number 4 peak on the Hot 100 at the end of June 1976. It was written about Hall's then-girlfriend, stewardess Sara Allen. The couple were together for almost 30 years before breaking up in 2001.

The song also peaked at No. 23 on the Hot Soul Singles chart and No. 18 on the Easy Listening chart. Billboard ranked it as the No. 11 best-selling song of 1976. On the R&R Airplay chart, the song debuted at No. 38 on April 2, 1976, and peaked at No. 7 seven weeks later. The single earned a Gold certification from the Recording Industry Association of America (RIAA).

The album Daryl Hall & John Oates was moving slowly on Billboard's chart until "Sara Smile" started becoming a hit. The album picked up momentum to hit number 17 on the Billboard 200, peaking simultaneously with "Sara Smile" on June 25, 1976.

== Critical reception ==
Record World said that "Daryl and John leave no question as to their ability to come up with another 'She's Gone.'" Nathan Brackett and Christian Hoard, in the Rolling Stone album guide, referred to the song as a "love bead ballad" and Steve Pond of the Los Angeles Times cited it as an example of the duo's R&B influences.

== Legacy ==
Following the success of "Sara Smile," the Atlantic Records label re-released the duo's previous single, "She's Gone", which had missed the Top 40 chart during 1973–74. In its re-release it rose to number 7 in late October 1976.

== Charts ==
=== Weekly charts ===
Chart (1976)	Peak position
Canada Top Singles (RPM)	22
Canada RPM Adult Contemporary	29
New Zealand (Recorded Music NZ)	22
US Billboard Hot 100	4
US Radio & Records CHR/Pop Airplay Chart	7
US Adult Contemporary (Billboard)	18
US Hot R&B/Hip-Hop Songs (Billboard)	23

=== Year-end charts ===
Chart (1976)	Rank
Canada	164
US Billboard Hot 100	11

== Certifications ==
Certifications for "Sara Smile"
Region	Certification	Certified units/sales
New Zealand (RMNZ)	Gold	15,000^{‡}
^{‡} Sales+streaming figures based on certification alone.

== Jimmy Wayne version ==
"Sara Smile"

Single by Jimmy Wayne with Daryl Hall and John Oates

from the album Sara Smile
- Released: October 3, 2009
- Genre: Country
- Length: 3:46
- Label: Valory Music Group
- Songwriters: Daryl Hall, John Oates
- Producer: Dann Huff

Jimmy Wayne singles chronology
"I'll Be That" (2009)	"Sara Smile" (2009)	"Just Knowing You Love Me" (2010)

Country music singer Jimmy Wayne released a cover version in 2009, with backing vocals from Hall & Oates. This version debuted at #51 on the Hot Country Songs chart dated October 3, 2009 and serves as the title track for Wayne's third album, Sara Smile. It became Hall & Oates' first single to chart on the country charts.

=== Critical reception ===
Sam Gazdziak of Engine 145 gave the song a thumbs-down, saying that it was "almost reverential" to the original and that Wayne's vocals showed R&B influences, but added that it "has no business being played on a country radio station." Bobby Peacock of Roughstock gave a more positive review, also saying that it was well-sung but not country-sounding, but adding that it was a "refreshing change of pace" from the "bombast of Do You Believe Me Now", Wayne's last album. Thom Jurek described the cover favorably in his review of the album, saying that Wayne "basically apes Hall's lead vocal[…]note for note" but "pulls it off in spades."

=== Chart performance ===
Jimmy Wayne's version of "Sara Smile" debuted at number 51 on the US Billboard Hot Country Songs chart in September 2009. After seven weeks on the country chart, the song peaked at 31 in December 2009.

Chart (2009)	Peak position
US Hot Country Songs (Billboard)	31

== Other notable cover versions ==
R&B group After 7 released a cover version for their greatest hits album The Very Best of After 7 (1997). The version peaked at number 31 on the Billboard R&B/Hip-Hop Airplay charts, number 99 in Australia, and number 130 in the UK.

British female singer-songwriter Rumer released a cover version on July 30, 2012 as the second single from her second studio album Boys Don't Cry (2012). The song peaked at number 47 on the Belgian Ultratip Bubbling Under (Flanders) chart. Rumer and Daryl Hall perform the song together on Live From Daryl's House. A music video of Rumer's version was made and then released to the public.

=== Ghetto Smile ===
The chorus of "Sara Smile" was reworked in 1996 by Northern California rapper B-Legit into the song "Ghetto Smile", collaborating with Hall who recorded new vocals.

The song was produced by Redwine and B-Legit and features guitars by Thaddeus Turner. The song was released in 1996 on B-Legit's second album, The Hemp Museum.

The song was later used in the 1997 film Dangerous Ground and was released as a single and a music video to promote the film's soundtrack. The music video features the clean version of the song and has B-Legit rapping and Hall and guitarist Turner performing on a separate set interspersed with scenes from the film.
