= List of reggae genres =

Overview of the subgenres of reggae music

There are several subgenres of reggae music including various predecessors to the form.

== Pre-reggae styles ==
=== Mento ===
Reggae grew out of earlier musical styles such as mento, ska and rocksteady. Mento is a Jamaican folk music based on traditions brought to Jamaica by West African slaves which blended with later influences such as the quadrille. Mento reached its peak of popularity in the 1950s with the success of acts such as Louise Bennett, Count Lasher, Lord Flea, Laurel Aitken, and Harry Belafonte, but is sometimes confused with calypso, a similar style from Trinidad.

=== Ska ===
Ska began in the 1950s, coinciding with Jamaica's independence from Great Britain. By the 1950s, musicians began to absorb the influences R&B and jazz from the United States, resulting in the development of ska. It incorporates elements of mento and calypso, as well as American Jazz and R&B, which were popular on Jamaican radio. The style is characterized by chord chops on the offbeat, sometimes called "upstrokes". The tempo is usually upbeat and often features horns, usually trumpets, saxophones, and trombones, as well as pianos and keyboards, bass, and drums. In the early-to-mid 1960s, ska became the most popular form of music in Jamaica and set the stage for rocksteady and reggae. Many of ska's popular acts such as Desmond Dekker & the Aces, Bob Marley and the Wailers, the Skatalites, Toots & the Maytals, Byron Lee & the Dragonaires, and the Melodians, later became associated with reggae.

=== Rocksteady ===
In 1966, many ska musicians began to favour slower rhythms and beats, and the form began to evolve into rocksteady. A successor of ska and a precursor to reggae, rocksteady was performed by Jamaican vocal harmony groups such as the Gaylads, Toots & the Maytals, the Heptones and the Paragons.

== Early reggae ==
The early reggae era emerged around 1968 as musicians built on the slower rhythms of rocksteady while incorporating influences from American funk, particularly recordings released by labels such as Stax. The slower tempo gave musicians more space to experiment with rhythmic patterns. One of the features that distinguished early reggae from rocksteady was the "bubble" organ pattern, a percussive style that emphasized the eighth-note subdivision of the groove.

The guitar "skanks" on the second and fourth beat of the bar began to be replaced by a strumming pattern similar to mento and the so-called double chop that can be heard so audibly in the introduction of Bob Marley's "Stir It Up" was developed during this time. More emphasis was put on the groove of the music, and there was a growing trend of recording a "version" on the B-side of a single. The mass popularity of instrumental music in the ska and rocksteady eras continued in reggae, producing some of the most memorable recordings of the early reggae era. Cover versions of Motown, Stax and Atlantic Records soul songs remained popular in early reggae, often helping Jamaican artists gain a foothold in foreign markets such as the UK.

As a testament to its far reaching impact in other markets, this era and sound of reggae is sometimes referred to in retrospect as "skinhead reggae" because of its popularity among the working class skinhead subculture in the UK during the late 1960s and early 1970s. One Caribbean band based in London, The Pyramids, even released an entire album dedicated to the unruly English youth culture under the name Symarip which featured songs such as "Skinhead Moonstomp" and "Skinhead Girl". Eventually the, often experimental, sounds of early reggae gave way to the more refined sound made popular by Bob Marley's most famous recordings. Indeed, this era seems fittingly capped off by the 1973 release of Catch a Fire. Notable artists from this era include John Holt, Toots & the Maytals and The Pioneers.

== Roots reggae ==
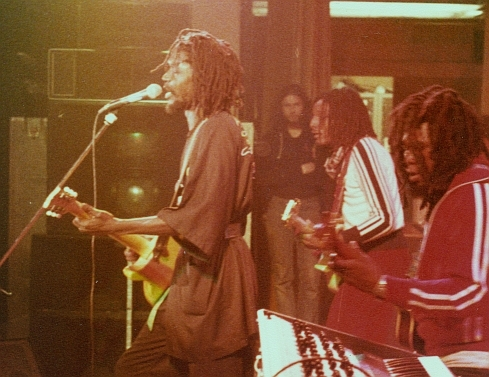
Peter Tosh performing with his band in 1978.

Roots reggae usually refers to the most recognizable kind of reggae, popularized internationally by artists like Bob Marley and Peter Tosh, which dominated Jamaican recordings from around 1972 into the early 1980s. While there are distinct musical characteristics to this era of reggae music, the term "roots" often implies more the message of the music than specifically its musical style and is still often used today to refer either to a musical style/subgenre or to give context to an artists music that may, in fact, cover several subgenres of reggae. Roots reggae, in this descriptive sense, can be typified by lyrics grounded in the Rastafarian movement's "Back to Africa" message, equation of colonialism and slavery with the Biblical captivity in Babylon, and, of course, the belief in one living God, Jah, manifested as Ethiopia's Emperor Haile Selassie. Recurrent lyrical themes include poverty and resistance to economic and racial oppression as well as more poetic meditations on spiritual or topical themes.

Musically, the "roots" sound and era have a number of distinct features. Drummers developed more complex kick drum patterns based around the "one drop" of rocksteady and incorporated influences from Funk and R&B. The guitar, piano and keyboard patterns in the music were refined from the creative explorations of the early reggae era into the patterns most recognizable as reggae throughout the world. Simple chord progressions were often used to create a meditative feeling to complement the lyrical content of the songs. This refining of rhythmic patterns and simplification of chord progressions brought the bass guitar entirely to the forefront, helping to make bass one of the most definitive features of reggae as a genre. Producer/engineers like King Tubby, Lee "Scratch" Perry and Prince Jammy (before he became a king) also played a large role in the development of the roots sound, with their heavy use of tape delay and reverb effects becoming one of the most recognizable features of the music. The roots sound can be best identified in the Jamaican recordings of the late 1970s by artists such as Burning Spear, Max Romeo, The Abyssinians, Culture and Israel Vibration.

== Rockers ==
The term "rockers" refers to a particular sound of roots reggae, pioneered in the mid-1970s by Sly & Robbie, and popular in the late 1970s. Rockers is best described as a somewhat more mechanical and aggressive style of playing reggae with a greater use of syncopated drum patterns.

== Lovers rock ==
The lovers rock subgenre originated in South London in the mid-1970s. The lyrics are usually about love. It is similar, if not a continuation, to Rocksteady. Notable lovers rock artists include: Janet Kay, Kofi, Louisa Marks, and Tradition.

== Dub ==
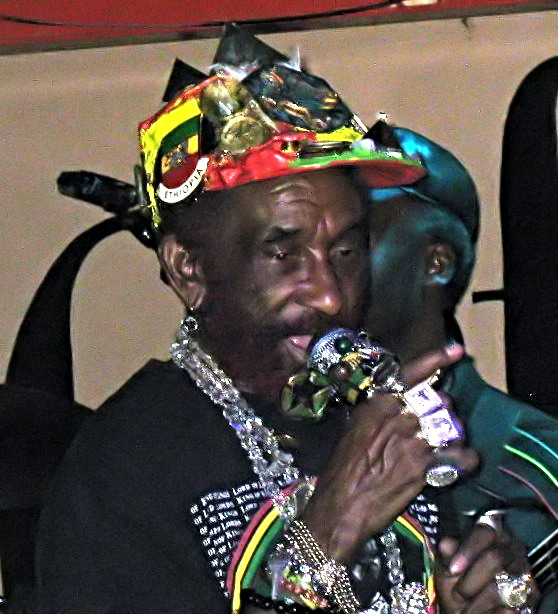
Lee "Scratch" Perry

Dub is a genre of reggae that was pioneered in the early days by studio producers Lee 'Scratch' Perry and King Tubby. It involves extensive remixing of recorded material, and particular emphasis is placed on the drum and bass line. The techniques used resulted in an even more visceral feel described by King Tubby as sounding "jus' like a volcano in yuh head." Augustus Pablo and Mikey Dread were two of the early notable proponents of this music style, which continues today.

== Rub-a-Dub ==
"Rub-a-Dub" is the term for the style of reggae in a more specific era from the late 1970s to the mid 1980s, and ruled but not limited to one band, the Roots Radics. Its signature sound is a slow tempo and heavy bass line. Back then, it was considered "Dancehall" music.

== Steppa ==
Steppers/Steppa in reggae is the typical 4-4 discobeat in essence. The UK styled steppers is the digital bassline style often with effects in the mix.

== Newer styles and spin-offs ==
=== Hip-hop and rap ===
Toasting is a style of talking over music, making heavy use of rhythmic phrasing and rhyme patterns, that was developed in the 1950s by Jamaican disc jockeys looking to add excitement to the mainly American R&B records they played in outdoor venues, called "lawns", and dancehalls. This style was developed by pioneers Count Machuki, King Stitt and Sir Lord Comic who took the current style of introducing and speaking over records played by sound systems and developed it into a unique style. As ska moved to rocksteady, this style of vocals gained a wider audience among Jamaican listeners. One of the earliest examples of this style is Sir Lord Comic's 1966 recording, "The Great Wuga Wuga". This style finally gained chart topping popularity in the late 1960s with deejays such as U-Roy and Dennis Alcapone scoring numerous hits. This style of speaking over records may have had a great impact on a young Jamaican DJ named Kool Herc, who had emigrated to New York City in the late 1960s where he began holding parties in the Bronx. It was Kool Herc's parties and the scene that sprung up around them that is generally credited as birth of hip-hop and rap. Mixing techniques developed later in dub music have also influenced hip-hop.

=== Dancehall ===
The dancehall genre was developed in the late 1970s by pioneers such as Yellowman and Eek-A-Mouse. The style is characterized by a deejay singing and rapping over riddims and was originally developed in the sound system culture in the wake of the increased popularity of early pioneers like Big Youth. The style of these early deejays was developed into a more continual rhythmic pattern of rapping that contained much more melody than the rapping style being developed in America around this time. The rhythmic patterns dance hall deejays developed in their rapping are based around the phrasing and speech patterns of Jamaican patois. An important characteristic of dancehall was the role of the selectors (and later operators) on the sound systems, who would routinely use the volume control on their mixers to remix the riddim around the vocalists rhythmic patterns. Musicians took the rhythms created by this mixing technique and began incorporating them into the music they played and recorded, a style still often referred to today as the "mix". An early example of this in recording would be Barrington Levy's 1984 hit, "Here I Come". Ragga (or raggamuffin) is usually used to refer to the type of dancehall music that emerged since the 1980s which is based almost entirely around these "mix" rhythms and contains almost no elements of what is traditionally perceived as reggae. In recording, ragga instrumentation primarily consists of synthesizers and drum machines. Sampling and MIDI sequencing is also often used in ragga production. A definitive example of "ragga" might be Beenie Man's 1998 hit, "Who Am I". Dancehall is a style and genre that was developed primarily by urban youth in Jamaica, as such its lyrical content is based in the lives of the people who made it and often contains lyrical content considered by many Jamaicans to be overly sexual or violent. In a word, dancehall might be described as "raw" and it has often been maligned in a similar way to gangsta rap despite the fact that many "conscious" artists continue to release dancehall music. In February 2009, dancehall with lyrical content "deemed explicitly sexual and violent" was banned from the airwaves by the Broadcasting Commission of Jamaica.

=== Raggamuffin ===
Raggamuffin, usually abbreviated as ragga, is a subgenre of reggae that is closely related to dancehall and dub. The term raggamuffin is an intentional misspelling of ragamuffin, and the term raggamuffin music describes the music of Jamaica's "ghetto youths". The instrumentation primarily consists of electronic music. Sampling often serves a prominent role as well. As ragga matured, an increasing number of dancehall artists began to appropriate stylistic elements of hip-hop, while ragga music, in turn, influenced more and more hip-hop artists. Ragga is now mainly used as a synonym for dancehall reggae or for describing dancehall with a deejay chatting rather than deejaying or singing on top of the riddim.

=== Reggaeton ===
Reggaeton is a form of urban music that first became popular with Latin American youths in the mid 1980s to early 1990s. Reggaeton's predecessor originated in Panama as reggae en español artist El General . After the music's gradual exposure in Panama, Jamaica influence and heritage in Panama it eventually evolved into reggaeton. It blends West-Indian reggae and dancehall with Latin American genres such as bomba, plena, salsa, merengue, Latin pop and bachata, as well as hip-hop, contemporary R&B and electronica. Notable acts of early Reggaeton style music are Dj Nelson and Dj Playero.

=== Reggae fusion ===
Reggae fusion is a mixture of reggae or dancehall with elements of other genres, such as hip-hop, R&B, jazz, rock, drum and bass, punk or polka. Although artists have been mixing reggae with other genres from as early as the early 1970s, it was not until the late 1990s when the term was coined.

=== ReggaeEDM ===
ReggaeEDM is a fusion music genre that blends the rhythmic, bass-heavy sound of reggae with the synthetic, high-energy beats of electronic dance music (EDM). Emerging from the roots of Jamaican sound system culture, ReggaeEDM evolved as artists experimented with combining the soulful grooves of reggae and dub with modern electronic production.

People Magazine recognizes Kēvens "as the creator of the reggaeEDM genre, a mix of reggae and rock". Based in Miami, FL Kēvens fuses elements jungle, reggae and live drum and bass. He is credited with coining the term "ReggaeEDM" in 1998 to describe his distinctive sound at the Florida Zen Music Festival.

Other notable artist who have influenced the emerging genre include Thievery Corporation, Adrian Sherwood, Asian Dub Foundation, and Major Lazer.
