= Music of Jamaica =

The music of Jamaica includes Jamaican folk music and many popular genres, such as mento, ska, rocksteady, reggae, dub music, dancehall, reggae fusion and related styles.

Reggae is especially popular through the fame of Bob Marley. Jamaican music's influence on music styles in other countries includes the practice of (Jamaican) toasting, which was brought to New York City. British genres such as lovers rock, jungle music and grime are also influenced by Jamaican music.

== In the colonial era ==
The earliest known notated Afro-Caribbean music is a set of tunes performed in 1688, which were transcribed by a Mr Baptiste and published in Hans Sloane's 1707 travelogue. (See "Koromanti")

The 18th century saw the emergence of annual clubs of performers called "set girls", who performed new songs of their own every Christmas season. Some of their songs were transcribed by an unknown observer in the 1770s; the manuscript was acquired by Edward Long and is now housed in the British Library.

Jamaica's first known pipe organ was installed in 1706 at the parish church of St Andrew's.

In the 18th century, Jamaica was home to composer Samuel Felsted, whose oratorio Jonah (published 1775) is said to have been the first complete oratorio composed in the Americas. Felsted served as organist in St Andrew Parish Church and Kingston Parish Church.

Felsted was preceded as organist at Kingston by John Daniel D'Luski, who had been acquainted with Handel and Geminiani in London and brought a collection of their autograph manuscripts to Jamaica.

The Moravian composer Joseph Jackson (1769-1808) was born in Old Carmel in Jamaica. Though he spent much of his early life in and around the Moravian settlement at Fulneck in England, he returned to Jamaica with his wife in 1800 and remained in Jamaica until his death. One of his pieces was adapted into Inuktitut and became a regular festival anthem at the Moravian Inuit missions in Labrador.

Other composers born in Jamaica include Frederic Hymen Cowen.

== Mento ==
Mento is a style of Jamaican music that predates and has greatly influenced ska and reggae music. Lord Flea and Count Lasher are two of the more successful mento artists. Well-known mento songs include Day-O, Jamaica Farewell and Linstead Market. Mento is often confused with Calypso music, a musical form from Trinidad and Tobago.

== Calypso and Soca ==
As in many Anglo-Caribbean islands, the calypso music of Trinidad and Tobago has become part of the culture of Jamaica. Jamaica's own local music mento is often confused with calypso music. Although the two share many similarities, they are separate and distinct musical forms. During the mid-20th century, mento was conflated with calypso, and mento was frequently referred to as calypso, kalypso and mento calypso; mento singers frequently used calypso songs and techniques. As in calypso, mento uses topical lyrics with a humorous slant, commenting on poverty and other social issues. Sexual innuendos are also common.

The Trinidadian calypso and soca music are popular in Jamaica. Popular calypso/soca artists from Jamaica include Byron Lee, Fab 5, and Lovindeer. Harry Belafonte (born in the U.S., raised in Jamaica from age 5 to 13) introduced American audiences to calypso music (which had originated in Trinidad and Tobago in the early 20th century), and Belafonte was dubbed the "King of Calypso".

== Jazz ==
From early in the 20th century, Jamaica produced many notable jazz musicians. In this development the enlightened policy of the Alpha Boys' School in Kingston, which provided training and encouragement in music education for its pupils, was very influential. Also significant was the brass band tradition of the island, strengthened by opportunities for musical work and training in military contexts. However, limited scope for making a career playing jazz in Jamaica resulted in many local jazz musicians leaving the island to settle in London or in the United States.

Among the most notable Jamaican jazz instrumentalists who made successful careers abroad was alto saxophonist Joe Harriott, now regarded internationally as one of the most original and innovative of jazz composers. Also internationally successful were trumpeters Dizzy Reece, Leslie 'Jiver' Hutchinson and Leslie Thompson, bassist Coleridge Goode, guitarist Ernest Ranglin and pianist Monty Alexander.

Harriott, Goode, Hutchinson and Thompson built their careers in London, along with many other instrumentalists, such as pianist Yorke de Souza and the outstanding saxophonist Bertie King, who later returned to Jamaica and formed a mento-style band. Reece and Alexander worked in the US. Saxophonist Wilton 'Bogey' Gaynair settled in Germany working mainly with Kurt Edelhagen's orchestra.

== Ska ==
Ska is a music genre that originated in Jamaica in the late 1950s and was the precursor to rocksteady and reggae. Ska combined elements of Caribbean mento and Calypso music calypso with American jazz and rhythm and blues. The first ever ska recording was made by Count Ossie, a Nyabinghi drummer from the rasta community. It is characterized by a walking bass line accented with rhythms on the upbeat. In the early 1960s, ska was the dominant music genre of Jamaica and was popular with British mods.

Music historians typically divide the history of ska into three periods: the original Jamaican scene of the 1960s (First Wave), the English 2 Tone ska revival of the late 1970s (Second Wave) and the third wave ska movement, which started in the 1980s (Third Wave) and rose to popularity in the US in the 1990s. The recent revival of ska jazz Jamaican Jazz attempts to bring back the sound of early Jamaican music artists of the late 1950s.

== DJs and toasting ==
Along with the rise of ska came the popularity of deejays such as Sir Lord Comic, King Stitt and pioneer Count Matchuki, who began talking stylistically over the rhythms of popular songs at sound systems. In Jamaican music, the Deejay is the one who talks (known elsewhere as the MC) and the selector is the person who chooses the records. The popularity of Deejays as an essential component of the sound system, and created a need for instrumental songs, as well as instrumental versions of popular vocal songs.

Toasting is a type of lyrical chanting over the beat. While Dancehall music involves deejays, they are the ones chanting or humming over the rhythm or track. With the rise of many different genres, toasting became popular in Jamaica during the 1960s and 1970s.

In the late 1960s, producers such as King Tubby and Lee Perry began stripping the vocals away from tracks recorded for sound system parties. With the bare beats and bass playing and the lead instruments dropping in and out of the mix, Deejays began toasting, or delivering humorous and often provoking jabs at fellow deejays and local celebrities. Over time, toasting became an increasingly complex activity, and became as big a draw as the dance beats played behind it.

Jamaican music, moved back and forth between the predominance of boasting and toasting songs packed with 'slackness' and sexual innuendo and a more topical, political, 'conscious' style.

== Rocksteady ==
Rocksteady was the music of Jamaica's rude boys by the mid-1960s, when The Wailers and The Clarendonians dominated the charts. Desmond Dekker's "007" brought international attention to the new genre. The mix put heavy emphasis on the bass line, as opposed to ska's strong horn section, and the rhythm guitar began playing on the upbeat. Session musicians like Supersonics, Soul Vendors, Jets and Jackie Mittoo (of the Skatalites) became popular during this period.

== Reggae ==
Reggae is one of the music genres first created in Jamaica. In the late 1960s, around the same time of toasting, reggae grew out of early Ska and Rocksteady.

Reggae became popular around the world, due in large part to the international success of artists like Bob Marley, Peter Tosh and Bunny Wailer. Marley was viewed as a Rastafarian messianic figure by some fans, particularly throughout the Caribbean, Africa, and among Native Americans and Australian Aborigines. His lyrics about love, redemption and natural beauty captivated audiences, and he gained headlines for negotiating truces between the two opposing Jamaican political parties (at the One Love Concert), led by Michael Manley (PNP) and Edward Seaga.

== Dub ==
By 1973, dub music had emerged as a distinct reggae genre, and heralded the dawn of the remix. Developed by record producers such as Lee "Scratch" Perry and King Tubby, dub featured previously recorded songs remixed with prominence on the bass. Often the lead instruments and vocals would drop in and out of the mix, sometimes processed heavily with studio effects. King Tubby's advantage came from his intimate knowledge with audio gear, and his ability to build his own sound systems and recording studios that were superior to the competition. He became famous for his remixes of recordings made by others, as well as those he recorded in his own studio.

== Other 1970s developments ==
Other popular music forms that arose during the 1970s include: Briton (Linton Kwesi Johnson's dub poetry); Sly & Robbie's rockers reggae, which drew on Augustus Pablo's melodica, becoming popular with artists such as The Mighty Diamonds and The Gladiators; Joe Gibbs' mellower rockers reggae, including music by Culture and Dennis Brown; Burning Spear's distinctive style, as represented by the albums Marcus Garvey and Man in the Hills; and harmonic, spiritually oriented Rasta music like that of The Abyssinians, Black Uhuru and Third World. In 1975, Louisa Mark had a hit with "Caught You in a Lie", beginning a trend of British performers making romantic, ballad-oriented reggae called lovers rock.

Reggae and ska had a massive influence on British punk rock and new wave bands of the 1970s, such as The Clash, Elvis Costello and the Attractions, The Police, The Slits, and The Ruts. Ska revival bands such as The Specials, Madness and The Selecter developed the 2 Tone genre.

== Dancehall and ragga ==
During the 1980s, the most popular music styles in Jamaica were dancehall and ragga. Dancehall is essentially speechifying with musical accompaniment, including a basic drum beat (most often played on electric drums). The lyrics moved away from the political and spiritual lyrics popular in the 1970s and concentrate more on less serious issues ragga is characterized by the use of computerized beats and sequenced melodic track.

Ragga is usually said to have been invented with the song "Under Mi Sleng Teng" by Wayne Smith. Ragga barely edged out dancehall as the dominant form of Jamaican music in the 1980s. DJ Shabba Ranks and vocalist team Chaka Demus and Pliers proved more enduring than the competition, and helped inspire an updated version of the rude boy culture called raggamuffin.

Dancehall was sometimes violent in lyrical content, and several rival performers made headlines with their feuds across Jamaica (most notably Beenie Man versus Bounty Killer). Dancehall emerged from pioneering recordings in the late 1970s by Barrington Levy, with Roots Radics backing and Junjo Lawes as producer. The Roots Radics were the pre-eminent backing band for the dancehall style. Yellowman, Ini Kamoze, Charlie Chaplin and General Echo helped popularize the style along with producers like Sugar Minott.

The 1980s saw a rise in reggae music from outside of Jamaica. During this time, reggae particularly influenced African popular music, where Sonny Okusuns, John Chibadura, Lucky Dube and Alpha Blondy became stars. The 1980s saw the end of the dub era in Jamaica, although dub has remained a popular and influential style in the UK, and to a lesser extent throughout Europe and the US. Dub in the 1980s and 1990s has merged with electronic music.

The late 2000s saw large local success for dancehall artists like Popcaan, Vybz Kartel, Shalkal,Konshens, Mr. Vegas and Mavado. In the next decade, others artists such as Tommy Lee Sparta, Alkaline, and Cashtro Troy, would also rise to the dancehall scene. By the late 2010s, music in Western markets saw influences of dancehall in pop music, including Drake's "One Dance" and "Controlla" (2016) and Rihanna's "Work" (2016).

== Reggae fusion ==
Reggae fusion emerged as a popular subgenre in the late 1990s. It is a mixture of reggae or dancehall with elements of other genres. It is closely related to ragga music. It originated in Jamaica, Reggae fusion artists from Jamaica with a #1 U.S. Billboard Hot 100 hit include Ini Kamoze with "Here Comes the Hotstepper" in 1994, Super Cat (featured on Sugar Ray's song "Fly"), Shaggy (2 #1 hits, like "Angel"), Rikrok (featured on Shaggy's song "It Wasn't Me"), Sean Paul (3 #1 hits, like "Get Busy"), Sean Kingston with "Beautiful Girls" in 2007, and OMI (singer) with "Cheerleader" in 2015. All are from Kingston, except Ini Kamoze, Rikrok, and OMI.

== Non-Rastafarian Jamaican religious music ==
The Bongo Nation is a distinct group of Jamaicans possibly descended from the Congo. They are known for Kumina, which refers to both a religion and a form of music. Kumina's distinctive drumming style became one of the roots of Rastafarian drumming, itself the source of the distinctive Jamaican rhythm heard in ska, rocksteady and reggae. The modern intertwining of Jamaican religion and music can be traced back to the 1860s, when the Pocomania and Revival Zion churches drew on African traditions, and incorporated music into almost every facet of worship. Later, this trend spread into Hindu communities, resulting in baccra music.

The spread of Rastafari into urban Jamaica in the 1960s transformed the Jamaican music scene, which incorporated drumming (played at grounation ceremonies) and which has led to today's popular music. Many of the above-mentioned music and dance have been studied by Rex Nettleford artistic director (retired professor and vice chancellor of The University of the West Indies) and Marjorie Whyle Musical Director (Caribbean Musicologist, pianist, drummer, arranger lecturer at the University of the West Indies). Since 1962, this volunteer company of dancers and musicians have had many of these dances in its core repertoire and have performed worldwide to large audiences, including The British Royal family.

== Other developments ==
Other trends included minimalist digital tracks, which began with Dave Kelly's "Pepper Seed" in 1995, alongside the return of love balladeers like Beres Hammond. American, British, and European electronic musicians used reggae-oriented beats to create further hybrid electronic music styles. Dub, world music, and electronic music continue to influence music in the 2000s. One of the latest developments is a musical form called Linguay which was founded by record producer Lissant Folkes in 2013.

JaFolk Mix is a term coined by Jamaican musician Joy Fairclough, to mean the mix of Jamaican Folk Music with any foreign and local styles of music and the evolution of a new sound created by their fusion. This is the latest Jamaican Music stylistic development of the late 20th century and 21st century. Jamaican music continues to influence the world's music. Many efforts at studying and copying Jamaican music has introduced the world to this new form of music as the copied styles are performed with accents linguistically and musically slanted to that of the home nation in which it is being studied, copied and performed.

== See also ==
- Stop Murder Music
- Reggae
