= List of people from Kingston, Jamaica =

This is a list of notable people who are from Kingston, Jamaica, or have spent a large part or formative part of their career in that city.

== Notable people ==
- Yellowman, reggae and dancehall artist
- Bob Andy, reggae vocalist
- Pamela Ball, Jamaican-British surgeon
- Buju Banton, reggae singer
- John Barnes, English footballer
- Aston "Family Man" Barrett, bassist
- Beenie Man, real name Moses Davis, dancehall artist and former husband of Michelle D'Angel Downer
- Louise Bennett-Coverley, folk singer, poet, comedian
- Atari Bigby, former NFL player
- Ken Boothe, artist
- Bounty Killer, dancehall artist
- Cindy Breakspeare, Miss World 1976
- Dennis Brown, reggae singer
- Errol Brown, singer
- Lionel Brown, footballer
- Cory Burke, footballer
- Knox Cameron, footballer
- Alberto Campbell-Staines, Australian athlete with an intellectual disability
- Canibus, rapper
- Frederic G. Cassidy, linguist and lexicographer
- Patrick Chung, NFL football player for the New England Patriots
- Kofi Cockburn, basketball player for the Illinois Fighting Illini
- Frederic Hymen Cowen, British composer
- Carole Crawford, Miss World 1963
- Theodore Curphey, coroner
- Omar Daley, footballer
- Robert Charles Dallas, lawyer, historian and friend of Lord Byron
- Chili Davis, former Major League Baseball player
- Desmond Dekker, singer and songwriter
- Sandy Denton, "Pepa" of hip hop group Salt-N-Pepa
- Coxsone Dodd, reggae music producer
- Frances Duff, heiress and landowner
- Sly Dunbar, reggae musician, dub music producer
- Leon Edwards, Jamaican-born English mixed martial artist, former UFC Welterweight Champion
- Eek-A-Mouse, reggae singer
- Elephant Man, dancehall artist
- Patrick Ewing, former NBA basketball player and coach
- Samuel Felsted, classical composer and organist
- Colin Ferguson, mass shooter
- Heather Foster, Jamaica-born American professional bodybuilder
- Shelly-Ann Fraser-Pryce, Olympic gold medalist
- Ricardo Fuller, footballer
- Ricardo Gardner, former footballer
- Amy Jacques Garvey, journalist, publisher, second wife of Marcus Garvey
- Chris Gayle, cricketer
- Andrew Gourlay, conductor
- Howard Grant, boxer
- Richard Hall, professional boxer
- Lisa Hanna, Miss World 1993, politician
- Kid Harold, singer, dancer and vaudeville comedian
- Bob Hazell, former footballer
- Paul Hewitt, U.S. basketball coach
- John Holt, reggae singer and songwriter
- Kamara James, Olympic fencer
- Jah’Mila, reggae musician
- Jermaine Johnson, footballer for Tivoli Gardens
- Janielle Josephs, athlete
- Sandra Levy, field hockey player
- Jean Lowrie-Chin, communications consultant, seniors advocate, author and newspaper columnist
- Macka Diamond, real name Charmaine Munroe, dancehall artist
- Lee Boyd Malvo, mass murderer who committed the D.C. sniper attacks with John Allen Muhammad
- Michael Manley, Jamaican politician and prime minister
- Bob Marley, great musician and singer-songwriter
- Damian Marley, reggae artiste and youngest son of Bob Marley
- Ziggy Marley, reggae artiste and son of Bob Marley
- Justin Masterson, Major League Baseball pitcher for the Cleveland Indians
- Mavado, dancehall artist
- Mike McCallum, three division world champion professional boxer
- Marcus Milner, footballer
- Sean Paul, dancehall and reggae artist
- Yendi Phillips, Miss Universe 2010 1st runner-up
- Oswald George Powe, political and equality activist
- Donald Quarrie, sprinter
- Shabba Ranks, dancehall artist
- Angella Reid, White House Chief Usher and Ritz-Carlton hotel manager
- Junior Reid, reggae singer
- Sanya Richards-Ross, Olympic gold medalist and world champion in track and field
- Hazelle P. Rogers, politician
- U-Roy, pioneer of toasting
- Ricky Sappleton, footballer for Cheshunt
- George Mearns Savery, British educator and founder of Harrogate Ladies' College, born in Kingston, Jamaica
- Rachel Scott, fashion designer
- Mary Seacole, medical pioneer
- Shaggy, reggae singer
- Winsome Sears, politician
- Robbie Shakespeare, reggae musician, dub music producer
- Nadine Spencer, businesswoman
- Raheem Sterling, footballer
- Billy Strachan, pioneer of black civil rights in Britain, WWII bomber pilot, communist activist, newspaper editor
- Super Cat, dancehall artist
- Karin Taylor, a former international fashion model, known as Playboy magazine's June 1996 Playmate of the Month
- Ryan Thompson, footballer
- Alfred Valentine, cricketer
- Vybz Kartel, dancehall singer
- Courtney Walsh, cricketer
- Clar Weah, First Lady of Liberia
- Devon White, former Major League Baseball player
- Willard White, opera singer
- Jheanelle Wilkins, politician
- Hyman Wright, reggae record producer
- Marlon James, novelist
