= Daryl Hall & John Oates (album) =

1975 studio album by Daryl Hall & John Oates

Studio album by Daryl Hall & John Oates
- Released: August 18, 1975
- Recorded: June–July 1975
- Studios: Larrabee Sound (Hollywood); Western Sound Recorders (Hollywood)
- Genres: Blue-eyed soul; pop
- Length: 35:20; 42:03 (reissue)
- Label: RCA Victor
- Producers: Daryl Hall; John Oates; Christopher Bond

Daryl Hall & John Oates chronology
War Babies (1974)	Daryl Hall & John Oates (1975)	Bigger Than Both of Us (1976)

Singles from Hall & Oates
- 1. "Camellia" Released: August 1975; 2. "Alone Too Long" Released: November 1975; 3. "Sara Smile" Released: January 1976

Professional ratings
Review scores
Source	Rating
AllMusic	4.5/5 stars

Daryl Hall & John Oates is the fourth studio album by American pop rock duo Daryl Hall & John Oates. The album was released on August 18, 1975, by RCA Records. It is sometimes referred to as The Silver Album because of its metallic-foil cover. The album spawned three singles: "Camellia", "Alone Too Long" and "Sara Smile". "Sara Smile" peaked at number four in 1976 on the Billboard Hot 100, becoming the duo's first top 40 and first top ten hit.

== Background ==
"Grounds for Separation", according to Daryl Hall, was going to be used in the Sylvester Stallone film Rocky. Frank Stallone, Sylvester's brother, had been in a band with John Oates called Valentine and this connection got them a shot at an appearance on the soundtrack. The film, however, was slow to get off the ground, and Hall and Oates withdrew the song. "Gino (The Manager)" is about Tommy Mottola, who was the duo's manager at the time. The record jacket insert reads "And introducing Tommy Mottola as 'Little Gino.' "

== Album cover ==
The album's cover shows an androgynous-looking Hall and Oates, both wearing makeup, against a silver background. It was designed by Pierre LaRoche, a makeup artist who was responsible for much of the androgynous look of glam rock artists at the time, including creating the appearance of the Ziggy Stardust persona for David Bowie. The cover came about after Hall and Oates happened to meet LaRoche, who like the two was living in New York City's Greenwich Village at the time; LaRoche told the two, "I want to do an album cover with you guys. I will immortalize you!"

In a 2019 interview, Oates said that the cover had confused listeners, because it seemed unrelated to either Hall & Oates' musical style or their public persona. However, he noted that it was in keeping with other androgynous-looking album covers of the time, including The Rolling Stones' Goats Head Soup and Rick Derringer's Spring Fever. He also noted that it was "pretty much the only album cover [of theirs] that anyone ever talks about, so in a way, if you just look at it in a purely analytical way, I guess it was very successful." In an interview for VH1's Behind the Music, Hall joked that the cover made him look like "the girl I always wanted to go out with".

== Re-releases ==
In 2000, Buddah Records re-released the album with two bonus tracks ("What's Important to Me" and "Ice").

In 2009, Sony Music Custom Marketing Group released a triple pack of Hall & Oates albums, consisting of this album, H2O and Ooh Yeah!.

== Track listing ==
All tracks are written by Daryl Hall and John Oates, except where noted.

Side one
No.	Title	Writer(s)	Length
1.	"Camellia"	Oates	2:48
2.	"Sara Smile"		3:07
3.	"Alone Too Long"	Oates	3:21
4.	"Out of Me, Out of You"		3:28
5.	"Nothing at All"	Hall; Sara Allen	4:24

Side two
No.	Title	Writer(s)	Length
6.	"Gino (The Manager)"		4:10
7.	"(You Know) It Doesn't Matter Anymore"	Hall; Allen	3:07
8.	"Ennui on the Mountain"		3:15
9.	"Grounds for Separation"	Hall	4:12
10.	"Soldering"	Stanley Beckford; Alvin Ranglin	3:24
Total length:			35:20

Remastered CD bonus tracks
No.	Title	Writer(s)	Length
11.	"What's Important to Me" (Demo)	Hall	3:46
12.	"Ice" (Demo)	Oates	2:57
Total length:			42:03

== Personnel ==
=== Musicians ===
- Daryl Hall – lead vocals (2, 4–10, 11), backing vocals, keyboards
- John Oates – lead vocals (1, 3, 10, 12), backing vocals, guitars
- Christopher Bond – guitar, synthesizers, Hammond organ, arrangements (1, 6, 8, 9), string and horn arrangements
- Clarence McDonald – piano (2)
- Leland Sklar – bass
- Scotty Edwards – bass
- Jim Gordon – drums
- Ed Greene – drums
- Mike Baird – drums (9)
- Gary Coleman – percussion
- Sara Allen – backing vocals (7)

=== Technical ===
- Produced by Christopher Bond, Daryl Hall, and John Oates
- Engineered by Barry Rudolph and Armin Steiner
- Mixed by Christopher Bond and Barry Rudolph at Sound Labs (Hollywood, CA)
- Mastered by Allen Zentz at Allen Zentz Mastering (San Clemente, CA)
- Cover concept and make-up – Pierre LaRoche
- Photography – Bill King
- A&R Coordination – Margie Meoli

2000 Reissue

- Producers – Jeremy Holiday and Rob Santos
- Editing and Mixing – Dennis Ferrante
- Mastering – Elliott Federman
- Digital Transfers Technician – Bob Harty
