= Soldering (song) =

Single by Desmond Dekker and the Four Aces
- B-side: "Beverley's All Stars's Just In Time"
- Released: 1965
- Genre: Ska
- Label: Beverley's Records

"Soldering" is a song recorded by Desmond Dekker and the Four Aces in 1965. The title is a euphemism for sexual intercourse, the lyrics are about a young girl wanting sex, and how a man wants to give her that.

The chorus of the song may be an interpolation of the 1956 mento track "Give Her Love" by Chin’s Calypso Sextet—which has a similar lyrical subject matter of a woman wanting a man's love and tenderness—along with taking a part of the Shenley Duffus song "Rukumbine".

== Other versions ==
Another version was recorded by the Starlights featuring Stanley Beckford in 1975 and credited to Ewart Beckford and Alvin Ranglin, It became a big hit in early 1975 for Jamaican Stanley Beckford, he is often not credited due to the lack of copyright in Jamaica at the time. Other artists who recorded his version of the song include the Specials, Hall & Oates, and Count Owen. The lyrics of the song is about a woman's choosiness when it comes to having sex with a man.

Stephen Thomas Erlewine of AllMusic described Hall & Oates' cover from the 1975 album Daryl Hall & John Oates as "fall[ing] flat" and "reggae tinged."
