= Lord Messam =

Mento Musician

Augustus "Lord" Messam was a Jamaican mento singer who performed throughout the 1950s up until the mid 1960s. With his band, Messam released several records that consisted of a mixture of original and traditional material on the Stanley Motta record label, under the name Lord Messam & His Calypsonians.

== Career ==
Lord Messam was a regular performer on the Montego Bay mento scene. Gigs featuring Messam as frontman are known from various flyers and advertisements covering the period 1949 to 1966.

In 1953, thirteen Jamaican bands competed in the "First Annual All-Island Calypso Band Contest". Lord Messam placed second in the competition behind winner Lord Power.

The 1955 "Calypso Pepper Pot" show was judged by Louise Bennett, Mapletoft Poulle and Stanley Motta. Besides Lord Messam & His Calypsonians, the bill featured local artists such as Lord Tanamo, Sir Horace, Lord Lebby, and Count Lasher, as well as some Trinidadian calypsonians. Lord Messam’s entry – "If You're Not White, You're Considered Black" failed to place in this contest — Messam's set was considered "tame" and aimed at tourists — though he did win the prize for best costume.

Messam performed regularly at hotels and collaborated with early recording stars such as Higgs and Wilson. Later in life, Messam became a mentor to some of the next generation of local musicians. Reggae and ska songwriter Clancy Eccles was one such artist who worked under Messam.

== Style ==
Messam's Calypsonians are characterized by their utilization of tight polyrhythms, with banjo parts that have been described as "pointillist." The opening bars of Messam's version of the traditional number "Linstead Market" have been compared to the sound of a music-box, and the few recordings that Messam left behind have been praised for their "dreamy" and "otherworldly" quality. The melodies are typically backed with a "proto-reggae" rhythm.

Like many mento artists, humor formed an integral part of Messam's music. The self-composed "Poun' Paper" takes a comic look at dating. In this song Messam warns about giving a woman cash too early in the date — the song describes his unsuccessful attempts to retrieve the "poun' paper" when the narrator's expectations are not met. Another Messam composition "Holiday Number", also examines relationships:

She want a bag that make with silver latch
She want gold chain and rings to match
She want corset to bring down her shape
For all she big and fat, she can't wear no drape
Excerpt from "Holiday Number" - Lord Messam & His Calypsonians

Lord Messam incorporated many traditional songs into his sets, such as the folk-song "Linstead Market". He made only a few recordings, perhaps as a result of his focus on live performance. A trained dancer, he was known as much for his dancing as for his singing.

== Discography ==
=== 78 rpm ===
- "Jamaican Mentos" (medley) b/w "Holiday No." (Lord Messam) by Lord Messam & His Calypsonians (MOT. 2142-3 MRS label)

(includes: "Mango Walk", "Gi Me Back Me Shilling", "Chichi Bud Oh" and "Hog In A Me Mint Tea")

- "Don't Tek It For A Joke" (Lord Messam) & "Rucumbine" (Jamaican mento medley) b/w "Poun' Paper" (Lord Messam) by Lord Messam & His Calypsonians (MOT. 2144-5 MRS label)
- "The Little Fly" (Rupert Lyons) b/w "Monkey" (George Brown) by Lord Messam and His Calypsonians (SM. 103, 105 Souvenir of Montego Bay label)

=== Albums ===
- Authentic Jamaican Calypsos Volume 1 (MRS label, Side one):
  - "Take Her To Jamaica"
  - "Linstead Market"
  - "Monkey"
  - "The Little Fly"

"Linstead Market" also appears on the MRS album Calypso Date, and on the CD compilations Mento Madness (2004, V2 North America) and Jamaica - Mento 1951-1958 (2010, Fremeaux).

== See also ==
- Calypsonian
- Linstead Market
