= Ken Khouri =

Jamaican record producer

Kenneth Lloyd Khouri (1917 – 20 September 2003) was a pioneering Jamaican record producer and founder of Federal Records, the first recording studio in Jamaica, which was sold to Bob Marley's Tuff Gong record label in 1981. He is credited by reggae historians for the birth of rocksteady in the 1960s. Rocksteady later mixed with Jamaican mento, a genre in which Khouri also had a pioneering role, leading to the creation of reggae music.

American singer Johnny Nash to recorded his first international hit "Hold Me Tight", which went on to sell six million copies globally and has been credited with first putting reggae in the American listener charts, at the Federal Studio, with his son Paul one of the producers. He and Nash's produced "Tears on my Pillow", which reached number one in the UK Singles Chart in July 1975 for one week.

== Biography ==
He was born in St Catherine Parish, the son of a Lebanese immigrant father Alfred Khouri, and a mother of Cuban origin, Alista Hylton, and grew up in Richmond and Highgate. His family was in the dry goods and furniture business. He moved to Kingston as a young man and joined the retail company E.A. Issa and Brothers Limited which owned jukeboxes operating in rum bars all over the island. The company was owned by the Issa family who were friends of his family, and there he learned about the music business.

When his father required specialist hospital treatment, he flew with him to Miami, Florida, and by chance overheard someone selling a disc recording machine. Khouri bought the machine and discs, and returned with it to Kingston, where in 1947 he set up a voice recording service. Khouri made recordings of local bands, and since there were no record pressing facilities in Jamaica, he sent them to the United Kingdom to be pressed.

Realising the commercial possibilities, he decided to set up a music recording business and traveled to California to acquire the equipment he needed to set up his own plant. Having until then had records pressed in the US, he also set up a record pressing plant in the early 1950s, and began pressing copies of American records under licence. Initially, Khouri mainly released mento and calypso music, later recording early examples of ska and rocksteady.

== Times Record Limited ==
In the early 1950s, he set up the Times Record Limited label with Alec Durie, owner of the Times store in Kingston, and began producing Mento records by local musicians, the first time this had been done in Jamaica. One of his earliest recordings was Lord Flea's "Naughty Little Flea". The records pressed by Khouri and others such Stanley Motta helped created the golden age of mento music and brought it to a new audience.

Times Records Limited was renamed as Federal Records in the early 1960s.

== Federal Records ==
The company was a powerhouse during the 1960s and 1970s. Ken Lazarus, Ernie Smith, Ken Boothe, Pluto Shervington, guitarist Ernest Ranglin, Don Drummond, Winston Turner Quintet, Eric Grant Orchestra, Gladstone Anderson, Cecil Lloyd, the Maytals, Eric Morris, Granville Williams Orchestra, Delroy Wilson, Marcia Griffiths, Bob Andy, Derrick Harriott, Derrick Morgan, Tinga Stewart, Roland Alphonso, John Holt, the Meditations, John Jones, Eddie Lovette, the Zodiacs, Byron Lee & the Dragonaires, Archie Lewis, were just some of the acts who recorded hit songs there. The Jamaican music from Dr. No was also recorded at Federal Studios.

In 1965, singer Hopeton Lewis recorded his rocksteady hit "Take It Easy" at Federal Records usually recognized as the first rocksteady single recorded. The slower and bassier beat style of this new rocksteady genre became the choice of partygoers in Jamaica over the previous jazz-based ska. This led Khouri to the creation of Merritone Label in 1966 within the Federal Records roster. Merritone was successful as well as influential, although short-lived.

Johnny Nash's international hit, 'Hold Me Tight' was recorded at the Federal studios. Paul Khouri assisted Johhny & Arthur Jenkins producing the record, that was released on JODA in Jamaica.

Bob Marley recorded his first single "Judge Not" in 1962 at Federal Records. Jimmy Cliff also cut his first track in 1962 at Federal studios for Count Boysie's sound system, who, in turn, would air the track at dances, although the single was never released.

Jamaican artist Ken Boothe's reggae version of the song "Everything I Own" was released in 1974 by Federal Records and reached number one in the UK Singles charts on 26 October 1974, and stayed at the top of the charts for three weeks

Some scenes in the 1972 film The Harder They Come, were shot at Federal Studios.

In 1981, Khouri sold the studio and his business interests to Bob Marley's Tuff Gong record label, owned then by Marley's wife Rita, who changed the name from Federal Studios to Tuff Gong recording studios.

== Legacy ==
Khouri has been described as a pioneer and visionary. According to Lloyd Bradley (in his Bass Culture book), without Khouri the "...new [Jamaican record producing] industry would probably have been stillborn. Ken Khouri was always going to be a central figure: Anyone who had a tune in his head could come to Ken to record it.. ..and get pressed up what ever he thought he could sell."

Recording engineer and founder of Island Records, Graeme Goodall said: "If there's one common denominator in the whole thing, not as far as the musical content but as far as the whole process [of developing the Jamaican recording industry], that was Ken Khouri, Papa Khouri. Because he was the one who had the foresight to develop the industry, y'know, build the studio, build the pressing plant. He was a very successful Lebanese businessman, but I mean he was the lynchpin of the whole thing."

In an interview he commented on his lack of recognition in the Jamaican music industry, stating that apart from some non-Jamaicans and a few old associates like Prince Buster or Pluto Shervington: "No one ever says thanks... I would rather that you do not say it but I am disappointed, especially with the Government, for not recognizing my contribution."

In 2001, he was inducted into the Hall of Fame of the Caribbean Development for the Arts and Culture Foundation, and before his death he was the recipient of the silver Musgrave Medal for his contributions to the music industry. He died in Kingston in 2003, at the age of 86.
