= Lord Tickler =

Jamaican Mento/Calypso musician

Harold Richardson
- Photo of the Ticklers: Harold Richardson in the middle, besides him are Danny Slue to his left and Charles Sang to his right
- Born: Aft. 1930; Jamaica
- Died: 1965; Jamaica
- Occupation: Mento musician
- Years active: 1940s—1965

Harold Richardson better known as Lord Tickler (Aft. 1930–1965) was a Jamaican Mento/Calypso musician whose music was popular in Jamaica in the 1940s and 1950s before his unexpected death in his early thirties.

== Life ==
Not much is known about Richardson’s early life, however he is believed to have been born between 1930 and 1935. Lord Tickler was part of a Mento trio called “Harold Richardson and the ticklers” (Richardson was the main singer hence his alias “Lord Tickler”) The trio consisted of Harold Richardson, Danny Slue and Charles Sang. Lord Tickler was one of the first Mento musicians to be recorded and the decade between 1940 and 1950 marked a change in Mento music, from mainly oral traditional songs to a nationwide recorded genre (which later influenced Reggae and Ska). The 1950s was the golden age of Mento music in Jamaica and the wider Caribbean (where it was advertised as being “Calypso” music due to the wider influence and large appeal of Trinidadian Calypso). Lord Tickler was one of the first musicians to record a variety of traditional songs such as Day-o (later popularised worldwide by Harry Belafonte).

The trio ended in 1965 when Lord Tickler unexpectedly died in his early thirties, Lord Tickler's legacy lives on in his family and in Reggae and Ska which adapted some of his songs.

== Discography ==
- Glamour Gal: one of Lord Tickler's most popular songs
- Mento Madness
- Limbo (1956)
- Green Guava (Take me to Jamaica album) (between 1951 and 1958)
- Medley (known as “Jackass, Ya ma mama ma ma”)
