= Messam =

Messam is a surname. Notable people with the surname include:

- Jerome Messam (born 1985), Canadian football player
- Liam Messam (born 1984), New Zealand rugby union player
- Lord Messam, Jamaican mento singer
- Sam Messam (born 1986), New Zealand soccer player
- Wayne Messam (born 1974), American businessman and politician
