= Count Lasher =

Jamaican singer and songwriter

- Also known as: Count Lasha
- Born: Terence Parkins; 1921; Saint Thomas, Jamaica
- Died: 1977 (aged 55–56)
- Genres: Mento, calypso, ska, reggae
- Occupation: Musician
- Instrument: Vocals
- Years active: c. 1950 – c. 1970
- Labels: MRS, Bongo Man, Kalypso, Melotone, Chin's, Caribou, Lasher Disc

Count Lasher (sometimes styled Count Lasha) was the stage-name of Terence Parkins (c. 1921 – 1977 (Note: Michael Garnice states that Count Lasher died in 1977 at the age of 51, but in the Caribbean Popular Music: An Encyclopedia of Reggae, Mento, Ska, Rocksteady, And Dancehall his birthdate is given as c. 1940)), a Jamaican singer and songwriter. Born in the mountainous parish of Saint Thomas, Lasher predominantly utilized first rural, and then urban mento styles in his music, although in later years he recorded some ska and reggae singles. Successful and prolific in output, Count Lasher remains an overlooked figure in the history of Jamaican music.

== Career ==
Count Lasher's career started soon after leaving school. An avid fan of mento music, he taught himself how to play the piano and the guitar before traveling to Kingston where he entertained the tourists on boats moored within Kingston Harbour.

A prolific performer, Lasher appeared at hotels, beach parties, charity events, and occasionally in cinemas before the start of the movies. He recorded on several different labels (his debut being produced by Stanley Motta), and was accompanied by various backing bands over the course of his career; early singles are credited to Count Lasher's Seven, with names such as the Royal Calypsonians and Calypso Quartet used later. Though Lasher's music was technically mento in style, Jamaican acts of the era often recorded under calypso-related names as the term 'calypso' had greater recognition amongst tourists.

Count Lasher entered some of the music competitions held regularly at Jamaica's Ward's Theatre. On 20 April 1957 the theatre's "Federated Calypso Clash" saw Trinidadian calypso artists Lord Pretender and Lord Melody battle mento locals Count Lasher and Lord Messam. Count Lasher continued to perform until the mid-1970s, releasing more than fifty songs, yet he never recorded any albums or compilations.

Both his age and the spelling of his real name (Note: The writing credit for "Sam Fi Man" is given to Terence Perkins, but the Lasher Disc single "Natta Bay Road" / "Female Boxer" gives the credit to Terrence Parkins) are still open to question, and despite believing that he could be the greatest of all the mento performers, musicologist Michael Garnice has also stated that: "Count Lasher may be the single most neglected artist in the history of Jamaican recorded music."

== Subject matter ==
Early recordings released by mento artists were primarily intended for use on the island's sound systems, only later being released to the general public. Like most of the mento songwriters, Count Lasher is a storyteller and social-commentator as well as an entertainer. Colorful local dialect is also employed liberally throughout Lasher's work, with themes and issues easily recognizable to the island's inhabitants. The chorus in "Mango Time" presents a list of mango cultivars:

Yes, the fellows push the carts all day and hear dem holler—"Mango dem!"
Dem got Beefy, Turpentine, Bombay and Number 11 – "Mango dem!"
Kidney, Harris and Joellen, Calcutta and Black Mango
Robin, Hilltop, East Indian, and all different kind of mango.
Chorus from "Mango Time", Count Lasher's Seven (MRS)

More Jamaican idioms are to be found in Lasher's arrangement of traditional song "The Weed" (aka "Man Pyabba"), which tells of a hungry man encountering an old lady with a basket packed with different medicinal herbs. The protagonist in the story is offered a bewildering array of herbs, with unusual local names such as: 'Tomtom Callback', 'Deadman get-up', 'Granny Back Bone', 'Granny Crack Cracks', 'Guzzu Weed', 'Puss in Boots', and the 'Ducky Batty'. Lasher laments that, "The only one she didn't have was the wicked 'Ganja Weed'.."

Many mento acts used suggestive lyrics in their work, and with a name like "Count Lasher" (local slang for a Don Juan-like character), it is unsurprising that Perkins recorded several 'saucy' numbers. "The Man with the Tool", "Female Boxer", "The Ole Man's Drive", and "Water The Garden" are examples of songs where double-entendres are gleefully employed by Count Lasher. Sometimes the subtext is only thinly veiled, for instance in "Robusta Banana":

She said the reason why she like the Robusta fruit
That kind of banana was born to suit
It was bigger and harder than the rest
And it can always stand the boiling test!
Verse from "Robusta Banana" a.k.a. "Jamaica Bananas", by Count Lasher's Calypso Quintet

In "Maintenance" Count Lasher recounts a tale of having been sued for child support, when he is adamant that the baby does not belong to him. The baby is white, and Lasher notes how: "I'm black, you think, and [the mother] is closely related to ink". After he is told that the baby is white because the mother drank Milk of Magnesia when pregnant, Lasher retorts: "..put me in jail if you like, I ain't paying.. ..For me to mind a child, well you have to know, that the scamp must be born singing calypso".

Many other subjects were examined by Lasher in his work. The West Indian passion for cricket is documented in tunes like "Final Test Decision" and "Tribute To Sobers", and in "Trek to England" Lasher angrily commented on the West Indian emigration boom of the time. He felt that the local 'gals' had been made 'vicious' by their obsession with obtaining enough money to purchase a ticket to the country.

== Covers ==
Count Lasher's "Calypso Cha Cha" was covered and renamed "Rocking Steady" by Bob Marley. The track appears on Marley's album 1967–1972 Gold. "Sam Fi Man" was later recorded by fellow mento artist Stanley Beckford.

== Discography ==
Count Lasher was prolific in terms of singles released, yet he never recorded an album, and no compilation of his music has been issued. A (possibly incomplete) selection of Count Lasher's recordings is given below:

=== 1950s ===
- "Sam Fi Man" / "Things Gone Up" (Motta's Recording Studio SM 141-DSM 39A/B) – as Count Lasher's Calypso Quintet
- "Mango Time" / "Breadfruit Season" (Motta's Recording Studio) – as Count Lasher's Seven
- "Water The Garden" / "Trek To England" (Motta's Recording Studio) – as Count Lasher's Calypso Quintet
- "Two Timing Lennie" / "The Saturday March" (Motta's Recording Studio) – as Count Lasher's Calypso Quintet
- "Pick Your Choice" / "Shepherd Rod" (Motta's Recording Studio) – as Count Lasher's Calypso Quintet
- "Perfect Love" / "Mother Bad Mine" (Motta's Recording Studio) – as Count Lasher's Calypso Quintet
- "Man A Yard" / "The Ole Man's Drive" (Motta's Recording Studio) – with George Moxey & His Calypso Quintet
- "You Got To Pay" / "Time For A Change" (Motta's Recording Studio) – with George Moxey & His Calypso Quintet
- "Calypso Cha Cha Cha" / "Perseverance" (Caribou Records 1959 CRC 100) – as Count Lasher & His Calypsonians
- "Slide Mongoose" / "Miss Constance" (Caribou Records 1959 CRC 105) – as Count Lasher's Calypso Quintet
- "Calabash" / "Dalvey Gal – Parson" (Caribou Records CRC 106) – as Count Lasher with Orch
- "Talking Parrot" / "Doctor" (Kalypso Records RL 15) – with Charlie Binger & His Calypsonians
- "Sally Brown" / "Cinemascope" (Kalypso Records RL 15) – with Charlie Binger & His Calypsonians
- "Man With The Tool" / "Final Decision" (Melotone Records 1963 FTM 2607) – as Count Lasher & His Band
- "Lasher Rides Again" / "Love Friction" (Melotone Records 1963) – as Count Lasher & His Band
- "Fish And Ackee" / "Please Louise" (Melotone Records 1963) – as Count Lasher & His Band
- "Robusta Banana" / "Mo-Bay Chinaman" (Chin's Records C 1006) – as Count Lasher's Calypso Quintet
- "Jamaica Bananas" / "Don't Fool Roun' Me Gal" (Chin's Records)
- "Jolly Jolly Shilling" / "Count Lasher Rides" (Lasher Disc Records LD 01) – as Count Lasher & His Pepsters
- "Natta Bay Road" / "Female Boxer" (Lasher Disc Records LD 02) – as Count Lasher & His Pepsters

=== 1960s ===
- "Hooligans" / "Jump Independently" (with Lynn Taitt and the Baba Brooks Band, Dutchess 1964 WIRL DR 1530-2/DR 1531-2)
- "Ring Ding '67" / "Winnie The Whip" (PEP Records 1967 S 7/S 8)
- "Dry Weather House" / "Tribute To Sobers" (SEP Records 1966 G 132/G 131 LOP 214/LOP 216)
- "Peace, Peace, Peace" / "Things Gone Up" (SEP Records 1966 G 140/G 141 LOP 215/LOP 217)
- "The Growth Of Federation: A Song About The Caribbean Federation" (Soundtrack for The West Indies, BIS Radio Television Division)
- "Bam Bam" (with Lynn Taitt and the Baba Brooks Band, Dutchess Records)

=== 1970s ===
- "A Change Me Mind" (Bongo Man)
- "Clean Face Rasta" (Bongo Man 1974 BM 00035 FCD 74-A)
- "Font Hill Duppy" (Bongo Man 1974 BM 00037 JR 9899)
- "Time To Sow" (Bongo Man 1974 BM 00030 FCD 74-B)
- "Water The Garden" / "Tenor In The Garden" (Sight & Sound Records)
- "Maintenance" / "Maintenance Part Three" (Bongo Man BM 00040 FCD 88-A/FCD 88-B)

== See also ==
- Lord Flea
- Calypsonian
