= Lord Tanamo =

- Born: Joseph Abraham Gordon; 2 October 1934
- Origin: Kingston, Jamaica
- Died: 19 April 2016 (aged 81) Toronto, Ontario, Canada
- Genres: Ska, reggae, calypso, mento
- Occupations: Singer, percussionist
- Years active: 1950s–2000s
- Labels: RCA; Gaydisc; Studio One; Trojan; Third World; Mooncrest; Grover
- Formerly of: The Skatalites

Joseph Abraham Gordon (2 October 1934 – 15 April 2016), better known as Lord Tanamo, was a Jamaican-Canadian singer and songwriter best known for his mento and ska work.

== Career ==
Born in Kingston and raised in Denham Town in the West of the city, Gordon was influenced by Lord Kitchener, who lived in Jamaica in the 1940s. His interest in music began at an early age when he heard a rumba box being played by local musician Cecil Lawes. He went on to perform locally as a teenager, singing calypsos accompanied by Lawes, and began performing in hotels in the early 1950s.

He first recorded for Kingston businessman and sound system operator Stanley Motta, and later recorded with a backing band that included Theophilus Beckford and Ernest Ranglin. His early hits included "Blues Have Got Me Down" (1960) for producer Emil Shallit.

He switched to ska in the early 1960s, and was a founding member of the Skatalites, singing with the band on tracks such as "Come Down" and "I'm in the Mood For Ska". He recorded for Clement Dodd, Duke Reid, and Lindon Pottinger in the 1960s, and had hits with adapted folk songs such as "Iron Bar" and "Matty Rag", and had further hits with songs such as "Ol' Fowl". In 1965 he won the Festival Song Contest with "Come Down". In 1970, he recorded a reggae cover of Tony Joe White's "Rainy Night in Georgia", which was a number one hit in Jamaica for seven weeks. He was based in Canada from the mid-1970s, where he married a local woman and opened the Record Nook shop, selling Jamaican-produced records, although he returned to Jamaica to record. During one of these trips back he recorded the 1979 album Calypso Reggae, for Bunny Lee.

In 1990, his ska cover of "I'm in the Mood for Love" gave him his only UK hit, reaching no. 58 in the UK Singles Chart after being featured in a television advert for Paxo in 1989.

In 2002, Tanamo performed as part of the 'Legends of Ska' concerts in Toronto, the performances recorded and released as a film in 2014. Tanamo continued to perform with the Skatalites into the 21st century, including a set at the 2003 Glastonbury Festival.

In January 2008 it was stated in a Jamaican newspaper that Tanamo was in a nursing home in Canada after suffering a stroke that had left him unable to speak. He died in Toronto on 15 April 2016.

== Discography ==
=== Albums ===
- Come, Come, Come To Jamaica – Independence Year 1962 (1964), RCA – Lord Tanamo and his Calypsonians
- Festival Jump-Up (1965), Gaydisc
- Calypso Reggae (1979), Third World
- Rolling Steady (2007), Motion — The Skatalites
- Best Place in the World (2000), Grover — Lord Tanamo with Dr. Ring-Ding & The Senior Allstars

Compilations

- Skament-Movement (1992), Alpha Enterprise — Lord Tanamo with The Skatalites (reissued 1999 as Skamento Movement)
- In the Mood For Ska (1993), Trojan – Lord Tanamo with The Skatalites
- I'm in the Mood for Ska! The Best of Lord Tanamo (2007), Trojan
