= Dread in a Babylon =

Studio album by U-Roy
- Released: 1975
- Genre: Reggae, toasting, dub
- Label: Virgin
- Producer: Tony Robinson

U-Roy chronology
U Roy (1974)	Dread in a Babylon (1975)	Natty Rebel (1976)

Dread in a Babylon is an album by the Jamaican musician U-Roy, released in 1975. It was a part of Virgin Records' mid-1970s focus on Jamaican music and artists. The album was a commercial success in Jamaica and Great Britain, where U-Roy supported it with a tour. "Runaway Girl" was released as a single.

== Production ==
The album was produced by Tony Robinson and engineered by Errol Thompson. The front cover depicts U-Roy's face masked by a haze of marijuana smoke. U-Roy was backed by the bands Soul Syndicate and Skin, Flesh & Bones. "Trench Town Rock" is an instrumental. U-Roy's favorite song on the album was "Chalice in the Palace", on which he imagines himself smoking pot with Elizabeth II.

== Critical reception ==
Professional ratings
Review scores
Source	Rating
AllMusic	4.5/5 stars
The Encyclopedia of Popular Music	4/5 stars
Omaha World-Herald	3/5 stars
The Rolling Stone Record Guide	4/5 stars

The Neath Guardian said that U-Roy's "screams, wails and babbled ideas capture the moment and free the music." The Birmingham Evening Mail called Dread in a Babylon "interesting, but uncompromising and largely incomprehensible." The Bristol Evening Post labeled it a "likeable reggae album with some nice vocal back-ups behind U. Roy's chatterings." Robert Palmer, in The New York Times, thought that the album was for only "the most wild-eyed fans" of reggae, due to its toasting style. The Omaha World-Herald called U-Roy a "hip rapper with roots".

In 1991, The Gazette deemed Dread in a Babylon a "classic" and "the rootsy stuff of legend." In 2005, The Age noted that the album "captured the elusive nature of the Rastafarian religion and also managed to preside over an album of extremely accessible tunes". AllMusic stated that "U Roy doesn't have any trouble coming across as a distinctive presence; his scattershot repertoire of barks, chants, and screams is as critical or more important as the deft, unobtrusive backing woven behind him", and added that the album "ranks among the '70s dub masterpieces".

== Track listing ==
No.	Title	Length
1.	"Runaway Girl"
2.	"Chalice in the Palace"
3.	"I Can't Love Another"
4.	"Dreadlocks Dread"
5.	"The Great Psalms"
6.	"Natty Don't Fear"
7.	"African Message"
8.	"Silver Bird"
9.	"Listen to the Teacher"
10.	"Trench Town Rock"
