= Forever Version =

Studio album by Dennis Alcapone
- Released: 1971
- Recorded: 1971
- Studio: Studio One, Kingston, Jamaica
- Genre: Reggae
- Label: Studio One
- Producer: Clement "Coxsone" Dodd

Dennis Alcapone chronology
Forever Version (1971)	Guns Don't Argue (1971)

Professional ratings
Review scores
Source	Rating
AllMusic	4/5 stars

Forever Version is the debut album from Jamaican reggae deejay Dennis Alcapone. It was released in 1971 by Studio One, and features Alcapone toasting over some of the label's greatest hits. The album was engineered by Sylvan Morris who left large parts of the original vocal tracks in the mix, with Alcapone appearing to answer back to the singers. Tracks which formed the basis for the album include Larry Marshall's "Nanny Goat" (on "Nanny Goat Version"), The Cables' "Baby Why", Carlton and The Shoes' "Love Me Forever" ("Forever Version"), two tracks from The Heptones ("Baby Version" and "Sweet Talking Version"), and one from The Wailers ("Dancing Version"). The album was reissued by Heartbeat Records on CD in 1991, and again in an expanded form in 2007, with six bonus tracks.

== Track listing ==
=== Original release ===
All tracks are written by Dennis Alcapone

No.	Title	Length
1.	"Nanny Version"	2:25
2.	"Run Run"	3:42
3.	"Riddle I This"	2:32
4.	"Baby Version"	2:49
5.	"Sunday Version"	2:25
6.	"Version I Can Feel"	2:32
7.	"Forever Version"	3:14
8.	"Baby Why Version"	2:50
9.	"Dancing Version"	2:43
10.	"Midnight Version"	2:34
11.	"Sweet Talking Version"	2:07
12.	"Version You To The Ball"	2:35
Total length:		33:05

=== 2007 Deluxe Edition ===
All tracks are written by Dennis Alcapone

No.	Title	Length
1.	"Nanny Version"	2:23
2.	"Run Run"	3:41
3.	"Riddle I This"	2:31
4.	"Baby Version"	2:48
5.	"Sunday Version"	2:29
6.	"Version I Can Feel"	2:31
7.	"Forever Version"	3:45
8.	"Baby Why Version"	2:51
9.	"Dancing Version"	2:45
10.	"Midnight Version"	2:38
11.	"Sweet Talking Version"	2:09
12.	"Version You To The Ball"	2:34
13.	"Home Version"	2:56
14.	"El Paso"	2:31
15.	"Fever Teaser"	2:10
16.	"The Conqueror"	3:19
17.	"Power Version"	3:20
18.	"Forever Version (Extended Mix)"	9:08
