= Hyman Wright =

- Also known as: Papa Life
- Born: Kingston, Jamaica
- Origin: Brooklyn, New York
- Genres: Reggae, dancehall
- Occupation: Record producer
- Years active: ca. 1972–present
- Labels: Jah Life

Hyman Wright (also known as Papa Life) is a record producer and audio engineer from Kingston, Jamaica, who has produced more than 150 reggae singles, mostly through his Brooklyn-based record label, Jah Life, which he founded in the late 1970s.

In 1981, Wright produced one of Eek-A-Mouse's first singles, "Georgie Porgie". After Wright and Barrington Levy met in 1979, he produced a number of Levy's early releases. Among these are "Black Roses" (1983) and "Murderer" (1984); the latter Wright co-produced with long-time collaborator Patrick Chin.

== See also ==
- List of people from Kingston, Jamaica
