= Linstead Market =

Jamaican folk song

"Linstead Market" is a Jamaican folk song of the mento type that tells of a mother who goes to the market with her ackee fruit but does not sell any, with the result that her children will go hungry.

== History ==
Possibly the earliest publication of the tune with words occurs in Walter Jekyll's 1907 book, Jamaican Song and Story, as item 121, pages 219–220. In Jekyll, the lyrics are as follows:

Cyar mi ackee go a Linstead market,
Not a quatty wut sell. Oh what a losses!
Not a quatty worth sell. Me carry me akee a
Linstead market. Not a quatty worth sell. Oh not a
light, not a bite! Not a quatty worth sell.

In Helen H. Roberts' collection of folk song variants based on field work in Jamaica, published in 1925, the version in Jekyll is reproduced, followed by twelve variants. In some of these, "Sollas market" replaces "Linstead market". (Sollas market became Jubilee Market, located on West Queen Street in Kingston.)

For example, Roberts includes a version as sung in Christiana:

Sold me ackee, go to Sollas market.
Not a quatty would sell.
Sold me ackee, go to Sollas market.
Not a quatty would sell.
So whole o' Saturday night,
so not a light, not a bite.
So not a quatty would sell.

In 1975, Oxford University Press published "Linstead Market" in Olive Lewin's collection of Jamaican folk-songs, with these words:

Carry me ackee go a Linstead market,
Not a quatty wut sell,
Carry me ackee go a Linstead market,
Not a quatty wut sell.
Lawd wat a night, not a bite,
Wat a Satiday night.
Lawd wat a night, not a bite,
Wat a Satiday night.

On page 14, Dr. Lewin explains that "Linstead Market still remains a picturesque small town market. The song is now often taken at a much faster pace for dancing but was originally sung slow and plaintively by a mother who couldn't sell enough at the market to feed her children. A quatty was a small copper coin of very small value."

A quatty (also spelled quattie) was worth one and one-half pennies (also expressed as three half-pennies, or six farthings). It was not in fact a minted coin – rather, it served as a standard unit when buying and selling. Goods were commonly sold in amounts which were worth a quatty, or multiples thereof. If the value of a good changed, the amount that buyers received in exchange for a quatty went up or down accordingly.

In all the versions mentioned above except the earliest, the melody is written in 2/4 or 4/4 time, but in Jekyll, the time signature is 6/8.

The melody has been arranged for solo voice with piano. One of the earliest such publications was "Linstead Market: a Jamaican Folk-song," by Arthur Benjamin, Boosey & Hawkes, 1947 (5 pages). Among choral arrangements is one of the same title by A. H. Green, published by Oxford University Press in 1967 (8 pages). The song was included on the compact disc " The King's Singers in 1992. The song was recorded by the English folk group The Spinners, sung by their Caribbean singer Cliff Hall. The song is also published in modern collections, such as Songs of the Americas, arranged by Margery Hargest John, published by Boosey & Hawkes, London, 1993.

The song was covered by legendary Cuban group La Sonora Matancera in 1957, in English and Spanish.

More recently, published in January 2014, the album by Monty Alexander, titled "Harlem-Kingston Express, Vol. 2: The River Rolls On", contains track #11, "Linstead Market (Live Bonus)". It is 6:37 long and features a spoken introduction. Liner notes of the album by Monty Alexander reference the track by stating, "... this beloved old Jamaican folk song from way before my time, is one of the staples of the Mento repertoire."

Brian Raphael Nabors arranged Linstead Market 2018 for string quartet, commissioned by Castle of Our Skins for its Celebrity Collaboration Project.

The track was recorded by Rob Macomber in 2012 at Dizzy's Club Coca Cola in NYC. Additional liner notes from the album regarding the song:

LINSTEAD MARKET LIVE BONUS (Public Domain) Arrangement: Monty Alexander Monass Music/BMI
Monty Alexander piano, vocals Hassan Shakur acoustic bass Joshua Thomas electric bass Karl Wright, Winard Harper drums Andy Bassford guitar Earl Appleton keyboards Robert Thomas, Jr. percussion

== Hymn tune ==
Quite a different direction of development was the inclusion of "Linstead Market," as LINSTEAD, arranged as a hymn tune by Doreen Potter in Break Not the Circle, Hope Publishing Co., 1975. Here, the melody is found with a hymn text by Fred Kaan. This arrangement appears in at least five hymnals:

Presbyterian Hymnal (1990), no. 514
With One Voice (Lutheran, 2000), no. 754
Worship and Rejoice (2001), no. 698
Sing! A New Creation (CRC, 2002), no. 258
Singing the New Testament (2008), no. 166

Hymns Ancient & Modern New Standard (1983) #481
