= Dennis Alcapone =

Jamaican reggae DJ and producer

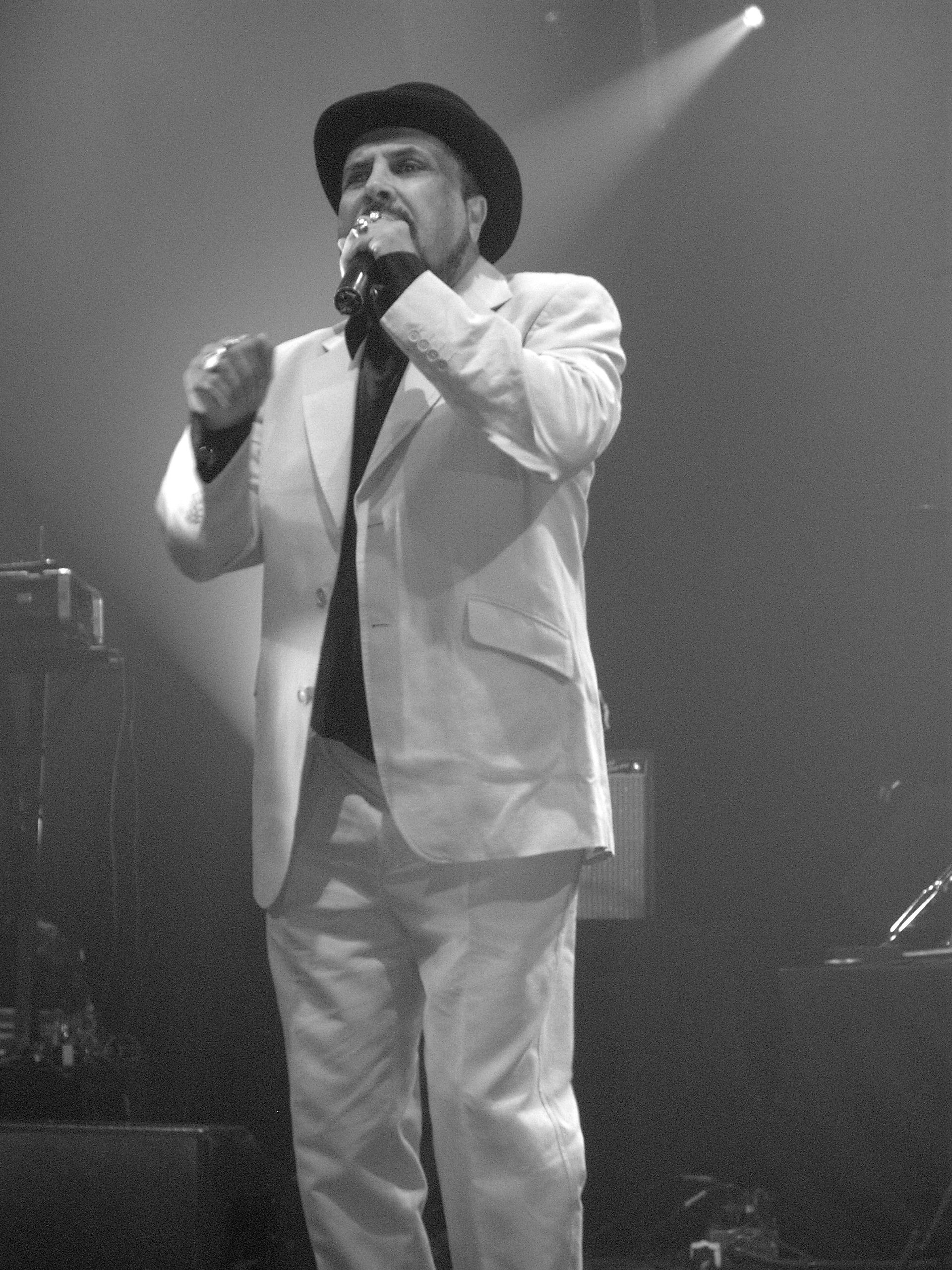
- Dennis Alcapone performing in 2006.

Background information
- Born: Dennis Asquith Smith
- Origin: Clarendon, Jamaica
- Genres: Reggae, dancehall
- Occupations: DJ, producer

Dennis Alcapone, born Dennis Asquith Smith, is a Jamaican reggae DJ and producer. In 2018, he received the Prime Minister's Medal of Appreciation from Andrew Holness.

== Early life ==
Alcapone was born in Clarendon, Jamaica. He initially trained as a welder and worked for the Jamaica Public Service.

== Career ==
Inspired by the big sound systems that he had visited in his youth such as those run by Duke Reid, Coxsone Dodd and Prince Buster, and particularly King Tubby's Home Town Hi-Fi, which featured the DJ U-Roy, and the Kentone sound system featuring DJ Pampado, Smith teamed up with two friends, Lizzy and Samuel the First, to set up his own "El Paso" sound system in 1969.

With Smith as DJ, the El Paso sound system caught the attention of producer Keith Hudson, who asked him to record for him, starting with "Marker Version", with singles following in the form of "Spanish Amigo", "Shades Of Hudson", "Revelation Version", "Maca Version" and "The Sky's The Limit", all in 1970.

Smith then moved to Coxsone Dodd's Studio One where he decided on a change of name, 'Al Capone' being a nickname that had stuck with him since going to see a gangster movie with friends. This resulted in the "Nanny Version" single, and his recordings for Dodd were collected on his debut album, Forever Version.

Producer Duke Reid then employed the DJ on a series of singles in 1971 and 1972 such as "Number One Station", "The Great Woggie", "Teach The Children", and "Musical Alphabet", and in the same era, Alcapone also recorded singles for Bunny Lee including "Ripe Cherry" and "Guns Don't Argue". In the period from 1970 to 1973, Alcapone made over 100 singles and released three albums, for a range of producers including Hudson, Dodd, Reid, Bunny Lee, Lee Perry, Joe Gibbs, Prince Buster, Alvin Ranglin, Prince Tony Robinson, J.J. Johnson and Phil Pratt, often recording for several producers on the same day.

He also began working as a producer, working with artists such as Dennis Brown, Augustus Pablo and Delroy Wilson, as well as self-productions. He was named Best DJ by Jamaican magazine Swing in 1972.

After several international tours in the first half of the 1970s, Alcapone relocated to London in 1974, and after releasing four further albums between 1974 and 1977, became less active musically, particularly after the death of his mother in 1979, although still recorded occasionally. He returned to live performance and recording in 1988 and appeared at WOMAD festival in 1989. He returned to Jamaica in 1990 to record again with Bunny Lee, and also made an appearance on Adrian Sherwood's Two Bad Card album. He released an album with Mad Professor in 1997, 21st Century Version.

== Awards ==
In 2018, he received the Prime Minister's Medal of Appreciation from Andrew Holness.

== Influence ==
Alcapone had his own distinct half-sung style with high-pitched whoops, with his influence visible in DJ's that followed such as I-Roy and the later "sing-jays". The second-wave DJ Dillinger initially named himself after Alcapone, using the name 'Young Alcapone' before changing his name at the suggestion of Lee Perry.

== Discography ==
- Forever Version (1971, Studio One)
- Guns Don't Argue (1971, Attack/Trojan)
- Soul To Soul DJ's Choice with Lizzy (1973, Treasure Isle/Trojan)
- King Of The Track (1974, Magnet) aka Musical Liquidator
- Belch It Off (1974, Attack)
- Dread Capone (1976, Third World)
- Investigator Rock (1977, Third World) aka Peace and Love
- Six Million Dollar Man (1977, Third World) aka Universal Rockers
- 21st Century Version (1997, Ariwa) – with Mad Professor
