= Kid Harold =

Jamaican dancer, singer and vaudeville performer (1899–1985)

- Born: Harold Alexander Smith; 22 March 1899; Kingston, Jamaica
- Died: 1985 (aged 85–86)
- Occupations: Dancer, singer and vaudeville comedy performer

Kid Harold (22 March 1899 – 1985) was a dancer, singer, and vaudeville comedy routine performer in Jamaica. His performances included being a part of the Harold and Trim duo in the 1920s.

Kid Harold was born Harold Alexander Smith in Kingston, Jamaica. He performed for Edelweiss Amusement Company, an entertainment business established by Marcus Garvey in the early 1930s, which helped Harold and other entertainers establish their careers.

Harold was known for his tap-dancing performances. He also appeared in Ranny Williams' plays in Edelweiss Park. He was part of the Harold and Trim duo with Lionel Trim. Their comedic routine drew praise from the Jamaica Gleaner in 1927. The song and dance team was the earliest in a tradition of renowned comedy duo teams that performed in Jamaica from the 1920s until the 1960s.
