= Stanley Beckford =

Jamaican musician (1942–2007)

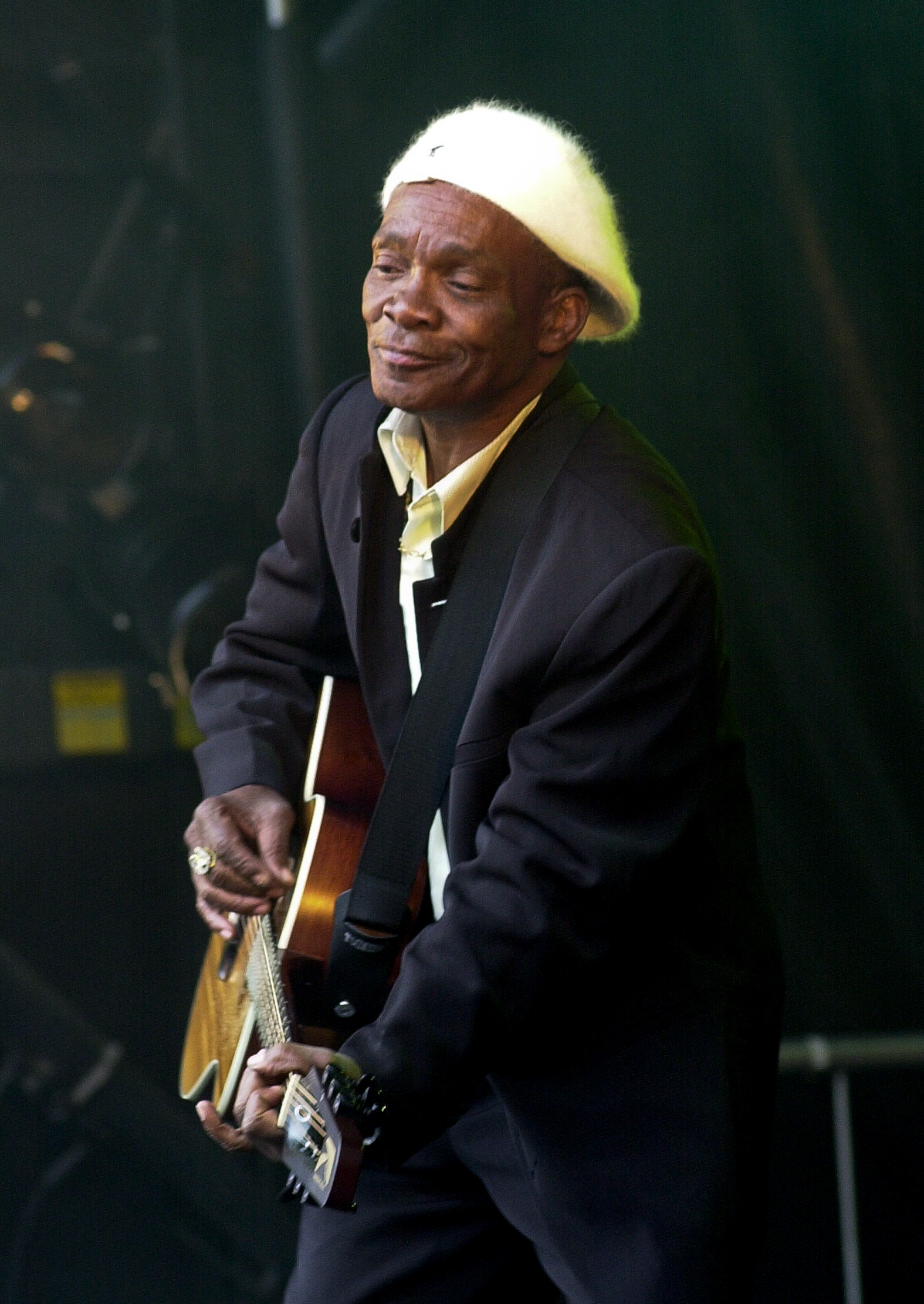
- Stanley Beckford at a concert in France in April 2004

Background information
- Born: Stanley Beckford; 17 February 1942; Portland, Jamaica
- Died: 30 March 2007 (aged 65) Riversdale, St.Catherine, Jamaica
- Genres: Mento, Reggae
- Occupations: Singer, songwriter,
- Instrument: Vocals
- Years active: 1970s–1990s
- Formerly of: The Starlights; Stanley and the Turbines; The Astronauts

Stanley Beckford (1942–2007) was a Jamaican born mento singer, songwriter, and four time Jamaica Independence Festival song contest winner who recorded as a solo artist and with the bands The Starlights/Starlites, Stanley and the Turbines, and Stanley and the Astronauts.

== Early life ==
Beckford was born in the north-eastern Jamaican parish of Portland. His mother died during his infancy. At seven, following the death of his father, he was raised by his grandparents, between the west Kingston ghetto areas of Greenwich Farm and Maxfield Avenue. He began singing in the local Church of God, and became choir leader, while neighbour Carlton Smith taught him guitar. Beckford gained recognition outside the church by winning one of journalist and radio presenter Vere Johns's talent contests at west Kingston's Majestic theatre.

In 1968 Beckford joined a neighbourhood reggae band, Soul Syndicate, but his high-pitched, nasal timbre and mento-influenced style did not fit with its focus. He was soon ousted, and subsequently he became a telephone company night watchman.

== 1970s And Beyond ==
Working one night in 1973, and witnessing an arrest, Beckford wrote "You are a Wanted Man" – which impressed producer Alvin "GG" Ranglin when Beckford gave an audition. Recorded with his band the Starlites (later credited as The Starlights), the song's mento-styled vocal bucked urban reggae trends and went straight to number one in the Jamaican charts. The group had further hits with "Healing in the Barnyard", "Hold My Hand", and "Mama Dee". His biggest hit was the lewd "Soldering" (1975), banned by Jamaican radio, which prompted vinyl ripostes from Big Youth, I-Roy, and Jah Lloyd.

Beckford became a regular on the north coast hotel circuit, playing to tourists and upper-class locals. After royalty disputes with GG, Beckford, changed the name of his group to Stanley and the Turbines, switching to producer Barrington Jeffrey, at the Dynamic Sounds studio. Jeffrey ran the Dr Komina label and an adaptation of the ribald mento classic "Leave Mi Kisiloo" (1977) was a big hit. It led to an album of the same name and a follow-up set, Brown Gal.

In 1980 Beckford (with the Turbines) won the prestigious Jamaica festival song contest with "Come Sing with Me". Financially disappointed with Jeffrey, Beckford recorded the album Big Bamboo (1981), with GG. It suffered from a less distinct mento influence.

In the mid-1980s Beckford's production waned as Jamaican music underwent popular music change to the computerised dance hall style. However he still recorded significant material, most notable of which is the digitally-backed Jamaica festival song contest winner "Dem A Fi Squirm" for trombonist Calvin "Bubbles" Cameron's Uhuru label and "Stanley No Idiot" (both 1986) for fellow singer Keith Poppin's Movements label.

During the 1990s, he recorded popular songs such as "A Wah A Gwan", and "Amazon", and made seven tours of Brazil. He won the Festival Song Contest for a third time in 1994 with "Dem a Pollute", now with the Astronauts. In 2000 "Fi Wi Island A Boom" won the Jamaica festival song contest, this time credited to Beckford as a solo artist, and he regularly performed with the Rod Dennis Mento Band at the Kingston Hilton.

In 2001, while playing hotel performances with the Fab 5 band, he was asked by French record executives to record an album of oldtime mento for the European market. On Stanley Beckford Plays Mento, released by Barclay, Beckford was backed by the Blue Glaze band, one of the island's top mento groups, with additional harmony provided by his wife Thelma and daughter Monique. The album and European tours gave Beckford a new audience; in France, he was compared to Compay Segundo of the Buena Vista Social Club and his success there led to the 2004 follow-up, Reggaemento, released by Warners.

== Death ==
Stanley was diagnosed with throat cancer and battled it for four years. Towards the end of 2006, Beckford underwent radiotherapy treatment at the University Hospital of the West Indies. He is survived by his wife, five daughters and two sons. On 30 March 2007 he died at his Riversdale home in St. Catherine. According to his wife, Thelma, she is trying her best to deal with her loss. "Is just me alone, I feel it. He died at home on our bed about 3:00 this afternoon (Friday). He died in my arms. I was shaking him, saying, Stanley, Stanley, but then I saw the blood running from his nose, there was nothing I could do," Mrs. Beckford said.

== Discography ==
=== Solo ===
- Gypsy Woman (1979), GG's
- Stanley Beckford Plays Mento (2003), Barclay
- Reggaemento (2004), Totou

=== with The Starlights ===
- Soldering: Reggae's Greatest Hits (1993), Heartbeat

=== with The Turbines ===
- Big Bamboo (1981), GG's
- Leave Mi Kisiloo, Dynamic Sounds
- Brown Gal, Tuff Gong

Compilations

- Africa (1996), Lagoon
