= Stanley Motta =

Jamaican music store owner

Stanley Motta was an electronics store proprietor who established a record label in Kingston, Jamaica and opened the first privately owned recording studio in Jamaica in 1951, jump starting Jamaica's music industry.

== Career ==
Motta recorded calypso and mento style albums. He recorded on 78 rpm records.

Talent from Vere Johns competitions was scouted by producers such as Clement "Coxsone" Dodd and Arthur "Duke" Reid. The groups recorded at Motta's studio. The records they cut would then be played on their sound systems.

Motta's electronics business became a subsidiary of Musson before it relaunched with an initial public offering (IPO) on the Jamaica Stock Exchange in 2018. It owns and manages the 58 HWT technology park property. The IPO raised $4 billion Jamaican dollars for the company.

Lord Fly (Rupert Lyon) recorded with Motta in 1952. Early band members who recorded include Bertie King on clarinet and Mapletoft Poulle whose big band employed many early ska musicians and Alpha Boys School alumni. Other artists Motta recorded include Count Lasher, Monty Reynolds, tenor banjo player Eddie Brown of the Calypso Clippers, Alerth Bedasse of Chin's Calypso Sextet, Jellicoe Barker (Lord Jellicoe), Lord Composer, Lord Lebby, Lord Messam, Lord Power and Lord Melody. Roland Alphonso, Derrick Harriott, Lord Messam & His Calypsonians, Lord Tanamo, Claude Sang Jr. and his brother Herman Sang of The Jiving Juniors and Theophilus Beckford also worked with Motta. Count Lasher released his debut album with Motta.
