= King Stitt =

- Birth name: Winston Sparkes
- Born: 17 September 1940 Kingston, Jamaica
- Died: 31 January 2012 (aged 71) Kingston, Jamaica
- Genres: Reggae
- Occupation(s): Jamaican reggae musician and DJ
- Instrument: Vocals

Winston Sparkes (17 September 1940 – 31 January 2012), better known as King Stitt, was a Jamaican pioneer DJ.

== Biography ==
He earned the nickname as a boy because of his stuttering and decided to use it as his stage name. Stitt began deejaying on Clement Dodd's Sir Coxsone's Downbeat Sound System in 1956.

Count Machuki, the original Jamaican deejay, noticed him for his dancing and offered him to try his hand on the mic. Stitt soon built his own deejay set, occasionally replacing him and eventually becoming one of the most popular deejays on the island's dances. He became King Stitt when he was crowned "king of the deejays" in 1963, in the heyday of ska.

Following the folding of Sir Coxsone's Downbeat's sound system around 1968 (as Coxsone preferred to concentrate on recordings), Stitt found himself working as a mason in Ocho Rios. He had been deejaying at the mic for over ten years when he was first recorded over brand new reggae rhythms in 1969, creating some of the first deejay records ever.

Born with a facial malformation, Stitt took advantage of it, calling himself "The Ugly One", in reference to the Sergio Leone Spaghetti Western film The Good, the Bad, and the Ugly. Stitt's first and most prolific record releases came from producer Clancy Eccles with classic deejay tracks that included "Fire Corner" (1969), "Lee Van Cleef", "Herbsman Shuffle", "King of Kings", "Vigorton 2" and "Dance Beat". All were released on Eccles' Clandisc record label.

== Influence ==
Adored by skinheads and mods in England at the time, he was crowned the Boss DJ. As Stitt's first deejay style records hit in England, several Jamaican producers tried to record other "veteran" deejays such as Dennis Alcapone and U Roy (both of whom were actually still in their twenties).

Upon the success of the first Stitt releases, Clement Dodd, aka Sir Coxson, began to release his own King Stitt recordings on now scarce 7-inch Studio One label singles. In the 1990s a full album of Stitt deejaying over late 1950s and early 1960s recordings, such as Owen Grey's "On the Beach", was released by Coxsone and entitled Dancehall '63. A full CD of hard-to-find 7-inch singles called Reggae Fire Beat, including his work for Clancy Eccles, was released on the Jamaican Gold CD label.

== Comeback ==
After years as an assistant to Dodd in Studio One's premises in Kingston, Stitt recorded again. He can be heard on a 2002 Bruno Blum-produced deejay version of Serge Gainsbourg's reggae song "Des Laids Des Laids" entitled "The Original Ugly Man", released on Gainsbourg's Aux Armes Et Cætera "dub style" remixes in 2003 (featuring The Revolutionaries with Sly & Robbie and Bob Marley's vocal group I-Threes). His last recording, an original ska tune called "Zoot Suit Hipster", was recorded in Kingston with Leroy Wallace aka Horsemouth on drums, Bruno Blum on guitar and Flabba Holt on bass. It was also produced by Bruno Blum and released in 2002 on his Jamaican label "Human Race" vinyl single. It is featured on the 2011 Human Race double CD album. A vocal duet version with Bruno Blum was issued on the B-side of the "Human Race" single.

Stitt, who lived in the house next door to Studio One on Brentford Road, was regularly performing in Jamaica as part of 'revive' shows. He can be seen selecting and deejaying on the Soul Jazz DVD documentary of Studio One called The Studio One Story. Stitt was seen on 2002's Legends of Ska concert series in Toronto, where he selected and deejayed before, after, and between sets. A documentary of the Legends of Ska concert series was made but not yet released. He was also filmed on one of his last public appearances at the Garance Reggae Festival in France, August 2011, and made his first full international concert in Brazil, October 2011. In his last concert Stitt paid tribute to his friend and producer Chester Synmoie, who had died during his tour.

== Death ==
Following a battle with prostate cancer, Stitt died at his home in Kingston on 31 January 2012. He is survived by a daughter.

== Discography ==
=== Albums ===
- Fire Corner – 1969 – Trojan Records
- Dance Hall '63 – Studio One (1993)
- Reggae Fire Beat – 1969–1970 – Jamaican Gold (1996)

== Compilations ==
- Serge Gainsbourg, Aux Armes Et Cætera "dub style" – (Philips-Universal Music) (2003)
- Human Race – (Rastafari-Patch Work) (2011)
