= Koromanti =

Earliest documented Afro-American music

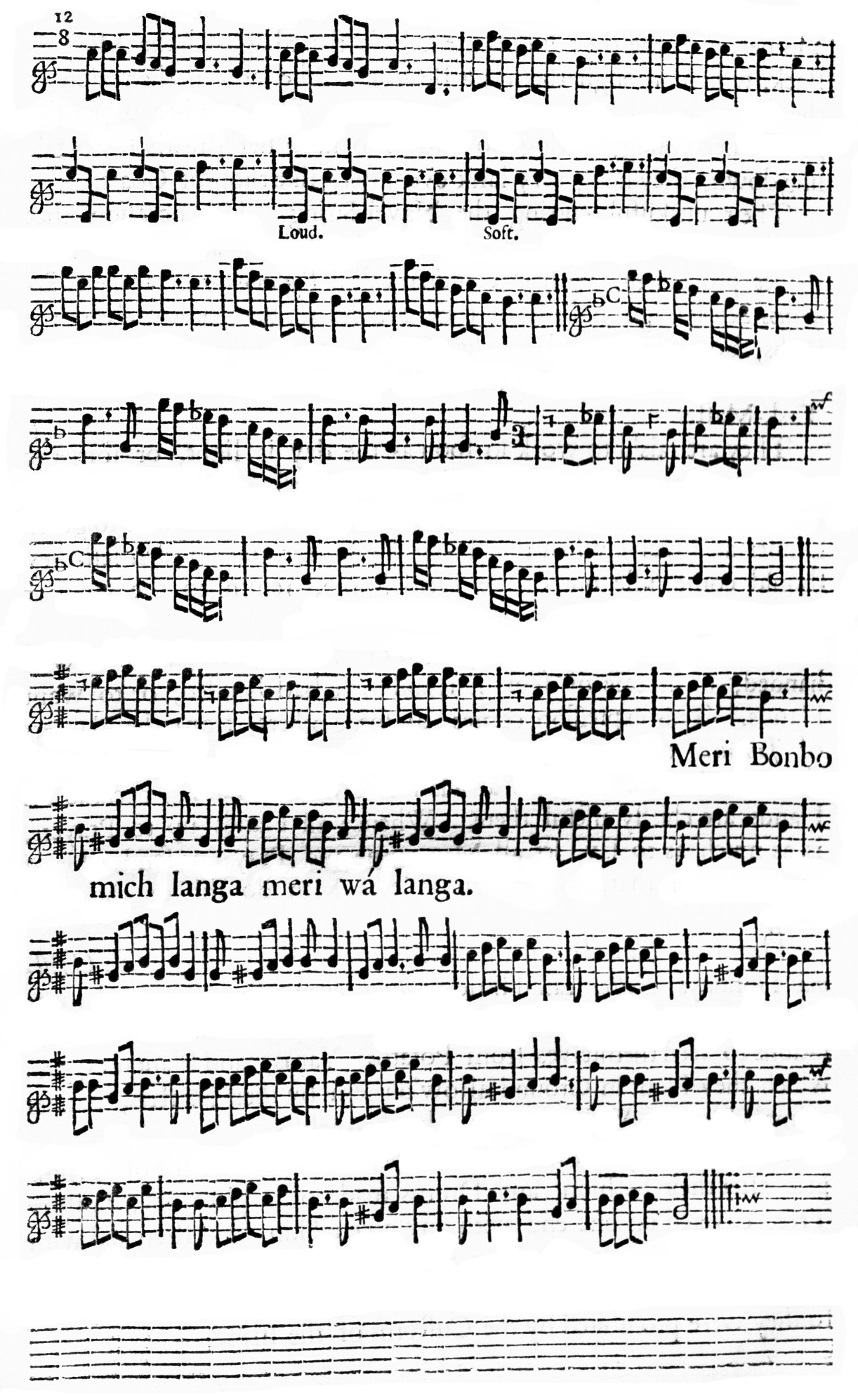
Mr. Baptiste's transcription of the "Koromanti" songs, published in 1707. The three songs are separated by double bar lines

"Koromanti" refers to three separate songs from 17th-century Jamaica, which are the earliest extant songs of enslaved Africans. They are also the earliest examples of Afro-Caribbean and Afro-Atlantic music. The music was transcribed by the otherwise unknown Mr. Baptiste in 1688 during a festival, upon the request of Anglo-Irish physician and naturalist Hans Sloane. "Koromanti", alongside transcriptions of the songs "Angola" and "Papa", was published in Sloane's A Voyage to the Islands Madera, Barbados, Nieves, S. Christophers and Jamaica in 1707.
