= Count Matchuki =

Jamaican deejay

- Born: Winston Cooper c. 1929; Kingston, Jamaica
- Died: 1995
- Genres: Ska
- Occupation: Deejay
- Years active: 1950s–1960s

Winston Cooper (c. 1929–1995), better known as Count Matchuki or Count Machuki, was a Jamaican deejay.

== Biography ==
Cooper was born c. 1929 in Kingston, Jamaica, and began working on sound systems in the 1950s, when the music played was largely American R&B. His stage name of Count Matchuki derived from his habit of chewing matchsticks. He initially worked on Tom Wong's Tom the Great Sebastian system and later the Tokyo the Monarch system, before moving on to Clement "Coxsone" Dodd's Downbeat Sound System. He added talkovers to the songs, emulating the jive talk of American radio DJ's at the request of Dodd, who became familiar with the US style on his visits to the States to buy records to play on his sound system. He thus originated a deejay style that was later developed by artists such as U-Roy. Matchuki started by adding spoken introductions to the records that were played, taking inspiration from the American magazine Jive. In the late 1950s, the prevailing sound changed with the advent of ska, and Matchuki added his deejay skills (often uncredited) to several records by The Skatalites. He introduced King Stitt to Dodd's sound system, and Stitt took over as lead deejay when Matchuki left to join Prince Buster's Voice of the People system. In the late 1960s, with little financial reward or recognition for his work, he left the music industry. He appeared in the Deep Roots Music documentary in the late 1970s along with Sir Lord Comic.

U-Roy has cited Matchuki as a major influence on his work. He said of Matchuki, "Count Matchukie, well he was a man I used to love to listen to. Whenever you been listening to this man, it was like you never hear anybody like that before. This man phrases his words in time, he doesn't crowd the music when he's talking. You can always hear what the vocalist got to sing. I used to say, I'd like to be like this man."

Winston "Count Matchuki" Cooper died in 1995. He is survived by his daughter Carla Cooper.
