= Alvin Ranglin =

- Born: 1942 (age 83–84)
- Origin: Clarendon Parish, Jamaica
- Genres: Reggae
- Occupations: Singer; record producer; record label owner
- Instrument: Vocals

Alvin 'GG' Ranglin (born 1942) is a Jamaican reggae singer, record producer and record label owner.

== Biography ==
Ranglin was born in 1942 in Eden, Clarendon Parish, Jamaica. He started to sing in public in his teens with an Adventist Church background. As a radio and television technician involved in the jukebox industry, he soon acquired his own sound system he named "GG". By the mid-1960s, he opened his own TV repair shop in May Pen and started to produce records with artists such as Trevor Brown; and as a singer with Vernon Buckley (later of The Maytones) as "Vern & Alvin" and with Lloyd Flowers under the name of "Flowers & Alvin". He soon developed his business by buying jukeboxes and opening his first record shop.

He took over the Gloria label from a family member in 1969 and had his first hit with The Maytones' (of which he was an early member) single "Loving Reggae". He worked with the vocal duo until they split in 1980 and enjoyed different hits mainly with love songs in the early 1970s. He started his GG's label in 1970 and had a big hit with "Man from Carolina" by his studio band named GG Allstars, an organ-led reworking of the Folkes Brothers hit "Oh Carolina". Among all the artists he worked with are Eric Donaldson in 1970 ("Lonely Night"...), Max Romeo, Billy Dyce, The Ethiopians in 1972, U-Roy in 1973, Prince Mohammed with the hit "Hallelujah I Love Her So", Cynthia Richards, Gregory Isaacs from 1974 to 1977 (including his debut In Person album, and the two Best of volumes), The Starlites featuring Stanley Beckford ("Soldering" in 1975), Jah Thomas in the mid 1970s ("Midnight Rock"), Dennis Brown in 1975, I-Roy in 1977, Dennis Alcapone, Mike Brooks in 1977 ("Guiding Star" launched his career), between 1977 and 1978 Jah Stone & Freddie McKay ("The Right Time"), in 1979 Lone Ranger ("Barnabas Collins" became a No. 1 in the UK reggae chart in 1980) plus Barrington Levy, with whom he enjoyed a string of hits in the early 1980s. Isaacs gave Ranglin his first international hit with "Love is Overdue", and in the four-year period that the two worked together in the 1970s, Isaacs status rose to that of a superstar. Ranglin worked with him again in 1995 on the Dreaming album, and again in 2002 on I Found Love.

During his long career, Ranglin set up different record labels such as GG's, Hit, and Typhoon, and record stores in places such as Kingston, Half Way Tree, Old Harbour, Brooklyn and London.

He lives in Kingston and owns GG Records, a recording studio and a pressing plant.

== Partial discography ==
The GG All Stars

- Man From Carolina – 1970 – Trojan
- Bonanza – 1970 – Trojan
- Musical Shot – 1970 – Trojan
- Flight 404 – 1970 – Trojan
- Ganja Plane – 1970 – Trojan
- The Three Dreads From Zion – 1978 – GG's

Compilations

- Various Artists – Reggae Flight 404 – 1970 – Trojan
- Various Artists – Reggae Reggae Volume 2 – 1972 – Trojan
- Various Artists – Atlantic 1 – 1975 – Horse/Trojan
- Various Artists – Street Corner Ital Food – 1979 – GG's
- Various Artists – From Chapter To Version – 1970–1974 – 1998 – Jamaican Gold
- Various Artists – From GG's Reggae Hit Stable Vol 01 – 1968–1973 – Jamaican Gold (1998)
- Various Artists – From GG's Reggae Hit Stable Vol 02 – 1969–1973 – Jamaican Gold (1998)
- Various Artists – Holy Ground – Heartbeat Records (1990)
