= Samuel Felsted =

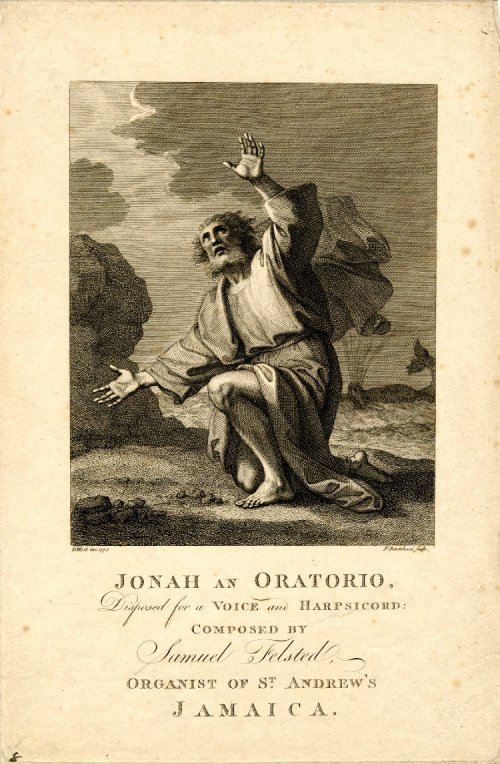
Title page of Jonah (1775) by Samuel Felsted. Engraving by F. Bartolozzi, drawing by Benjamin West.

Samuel Felsted (1743 – 29 March 1802) was Jamaica's first documented composer.

He was born in Jamaica, and his father was an ironmonger, merchant, and organist who started Samuel's music education. It is likely Samuel attended Wolmer's School in Kingston in his youth, and was educated in music by Daniel DeLuskie, the organist of the Kingston Parish Church.

== Career ==
He held a range of interests beyond music, including science, poetry, and painting, and sent specimens of native Jamaican butterflies to the American Philosophical Society. He was elected as a member of the American Philosophical Society in 1771. That same year, he invented a windmill intended for the sugar factories of Jamaica.

== Composer ==
During his tenure as organist at the St. Andrew Parish Church Samuel Felsted published his oratorio Jonah in 1775 in London, with illustrations by Benjamin West and Francesco Bartolozzi. His peers held him in high regard, as evidenced when 243 subscribers financed Jonah before its public release. The work was the first complete oratorio written in the Americas, and performed in Jamaica, New York, and Boston, including for George Washington on his 1789 inaugural tour in Boston.

Felsted's other surviving works include his unpublished oratorio The Dedication, possibly written in the 1790s, and 'Six Voluntarys for the Organ or Harpsichord', which were written during the time as organist at the Kingston Parish Church, a post he held from 1783 until his death on March 29, 1802.
