= Lord Flea =

- Thomas performing in 1957

Background information
- Born: Norman Byfield Thomas; 1931/32 or 1933/34; Kingston, Jamaica
- Died: 18 May 1959 (age 24–28); Miami, Florida, US
- Genres: Mento, calypso
- Occupation: Musician
- Instrument: Vocals
- Years active: 1949–1959
- Labels: Calypsodisc, Times, Capitol

Lord Flea was the stage name of Norman Byfield Thomas (1931/32 or 1933/34 (Note: Some sources, including contemporary sources, give his age at death as 27, and others as 25. His daughter, quoted in 2004, gave his age as 27, but in 2008 gave it as 25.) – 18 May 1959), a Jamaican mento musician credited with "helping start the calypso craze in U.S." With his band The Calypsonians, Flea toured America throughout the late 1950s, and released an album on the Capitol label. The band also performed in two calypso-related films

== Career ==
Thomas was born in Kingston, Jamaica, and began his career in entertainment at local dancehalls such as the "Adastra Gardens" and "Success". In 1949, he earned himself a year-long engagement after he had performed in the talent competitions held at the Sugar Hill Club.

Flea recorded and released records with the assistance of local business men, Alec Durie and Ken Khouri. Early singles featuring Flea's vocal performances were attributed to "The Blue Mountain Caroleers" or "The Jamaican Calypsonians".

Bill Saxon, owner of 'Club Calypso' on Biscayne Boulevard in Miami, traveled to Jamaica in order to search out an 'authentic sound' for his Florida venue. Saxon offered a residency lasting from two to six months, with the proviso that those artists that wished to apply for the gig, must have previously recorded some music. Lord Flea & his Calypsonians soon received a contract and began to perform for six months in America.

The music produced by Lord Flea and other artists from the Caribbean islands was marketed as 'calypso' but Flea's style was actually known as 'mento'. In a 1957 interview for the UK Calypso Star magazine, Lord Flea explained: "In Jamaica, we call our music 'mento' until very recently. Today, 'calypso' is beginning to be used for all kinds of West Indian music. This is because it's become so commercialized there. Some people like to think of West Indians as carefree natives who work and sing and play and laugh their lives away. But this isn't so. Most of the people there are hard working folks, and many of them are smart business men. If the tourists want "calypso", that's what we sell them."

Members of the Calypsonians assumed colorful stage-names. Besides Lord Flea himself, the band adopted memorable pseudonyms such as Count Slick, Count Spoon, and Prince Charles. The Calypsonians' bassist was called Fish Ray — an early exponent of the "walking bass" technique.

Lord Flea and his Calypsonians appeared in the edition of 11 February 1957 of Life magazine, in an article entitled "U.S. Tourists Rush to the Caribbean". The piece contained a photograph of Lord Flea performing at the Jamaican Room. Fellow bandmate Pork Chops can be seen in the picture alongside Flea, with the Calypsonians' bongo-player sat high upon a large barrel. That year also saw the band featured in more musically-orientated US magazines such as Hep Cat's Review and Calypso, as well as the UK's first issue of Calypso Star.

On 9 February 1957 Lord Flea & His Calypsonians appeared on The Perry Como Show where they performed "Shake Shake Sonora" and "Where Did The Naughty Little Flea Go?"

Little Flea's version of "Shake Shake Sonora" (later to be covered by Harry Belafonte) was reviewed in February 1957 by Billboard, which stated that: "Flea has a dynamic drive.." and that the single "could put many to shame." The review also added that Lord Flea & His Calypsonians produced "attention-grabbing sides [which] can stir action at all levels."

The late 1950s calypso craze extended to the film world. Rising star Lord Flea and his band appeared in two films released in 1957. The Calypsonians feature in Calypso Joe, and they perform several numbers in Bop Girl Goes Calypso, a film that has been pronounced "dead on arrival" and criticized as a "painful United Artists mistake", in which a psychologist studying "Mass Hysteria and the Popular Singer" persuades the "Bop Girl" of the title to embrace the "calypso" style, and to abandon her previous rock'n'roll singing technique.

The band played ceaselessly in America throughout the calypso craze. The band performed at Eden Roc Hotel for six months, and in Las Vegas at the Dunes, "Flea chalked up new house records, as he [had] been doing the past few months in New York's Jamaica Room." Unfortunately for the Caribbean mento/calypso artists, as Time magazine had already noted in March 1957: "Financially, American imitators are doing better than such authentic calypso singers as The Duke of Iron, or Lord Flea and His Calypsonians (Lord Fish Ray, Count Spoon, et al), whose cleaned-up version of the nocturnal wanderings of a flea is also a nightclub favorite."

== Death ==
Suffering from Hodgkin's Disease, Lord Flea was admitted to Jackson Memorial Hospital in Miami in 1959. According to daughter Kathie Way-Giddarie: "Each evening during his hospital stay, he would play music for the doctors, nurses and the patients on the isolation ward." On 18 May 1959 (at the age of either 24 or 28), Lord Flea died. Thomas's subsequent funeral procession was, at the time, the longest ever seen in Miami-Dade County.

== Subject matter ==
In "Mister Give Me Ma Rent", the Lord tells of a problem landlady who is "..too rude – in my affairs she likes to intrude.." The song goes on to depict financial woes and poor accommodation common to many Jamaicans of the time:

No chair, no table — this convenience is terrible
And on the other part — no hot water to take a bath
In the night I sleep like a rabbit — a dirty sheet off of a blanket
And she have the audacity to tell me I'm livin' in luxury!
Excerpt from "Mister Give Me Ma Rent", Lord Flea and his Calypsonians (Capitol, 1957)

In his "Calypso Be Bop", Flea name-checks his Bebop heroes. Dizzy Gillespie's "Anthropology" apparently sent Flea 'crazy'. Charlie Parker receives a mention, the song refers to Miles Davis as a 'smasher', and Jazz legend Lionel Hampton is also recommended to the listener:

This be-bop music, is really terrific
This be-bop music, is really terrific
I nearly went crazy when I hear the records of Gillespie
It really enchanted me just to hear him play "Anthropology"..
Excerpt from "Calypso Be Bop", Lord Flea & his Calypsonians (1957)

In an interview Lord Flea revealed his thoughts about the West Indian outlook on life, stating that: "The islanders know how to get more out of life. They don't worry as much as Americans do about unimportant things, I mean. You can say they just sing and dance their troubles away — and it beats psychoanalysis, you can bet." He went on to say that: "West Indians have the best sense of humor in the world. Even the most solemn song, like "Las Kean Fine" ("Lost and Can Not Be Found"), which tells of a boiler explosion on a sugar plantation that killed several of the workers, their natural wit and humor shine though."

"Monkey" has unusual subject matter. Awaking one morning to find a monkey at his garden gate, Lord Flea sings of how the monkey proceeds to follow him about wherever he goes, even going so far as to start copying Flea's actions: "When I put on shoes — monkey wears shoes too.. I don't what to say, the monkey won't do!"

Other humorous moments abound in Flea's work. "Donkey Bray" features Lord Flea braying the chorus with gusto, and in the Calypsonians' "Pretty Woman", Flea advises that "Love is the common enemy", and begs that you should "Run, run, run! When you see a pretty woman".

== Covers ==
In 1961 Harry Belafonte recorded a version of Lord Flea's "Shake Shake Sonora" which was renamed "Jump in the Line (Shake, Senora)" and later appeared in the 1988 film Beetlejuice. Flea had used Lord Invader's earlier 1955 recording "Labor Day (Jump in the Line)" for inspiration, which itself was a cover of Lord Kitchener's original "Jump in the Line and Wag Your Body in Time" of 1946. "Where Did The Naughty Little Flea Go?" has been also been covered by Belafonte (who stated that Lord Flea was the song's composer), as well as Miriam Makeba, and Toots and the Maytals amongst others. Thomas' daughter recalled asking her father about the meaning behind "The Naughty Little Flea": "His answer to me was that 'when he was gone that there would be another, then another and then another.'"

== Discography ==
=== Singles ===
"Ol Fowl" b/w "Irene & Yo' Fr'en" – with the Blue Blue Mountain Caroleers (1953 Calypsodisc label CT.100) (Savoy Record Shop)

"Man Forty Leg" b/w "The Number One" – with the Blue Mountain Caroleers (1953 CT 101 AT/3 AT/4 Calypsotime label, and also Calypsodisc)

"Wheel and Turn Me" b/w "Matty Rag" / "Brown Skin Gal" – with the Jamaican Calypsonians (Times Record label UD 1003 D JAM 103/D JAM 104) ("Wheel and Turn Me" appears on the 2006 CD compilation Take Me To Jamaica)

"Donkey City" b/w "Run Mongoose" / "Linstead Market" – with the Jamaican Calypsonians (Times Record label UD 1003 D JAM 105/D JAM 106)

"Time So Hard" / "Old Lady" b/w "Solas Market" / "Water Come From Me Eye" – with the Jamaican Calypsonians (Times Record label UD 1003 D JAM 101/D JAM 102)

Six of Lord Flea's Ken Khouri Times Record sides appear on the compilation LP Calypsos From Jamaica: 1. "Time so Hard" / "Old Lady" b/w "Solas Market" / "Water Comes From My Eye". 2. "Wheel and Turn Me" b/w "Mattie Rag" / "Brown Skin Gal". 3. "Run Mongoose" / "Linstead Market" b/w "Donkey City".

The original version of "Naughty Little Flea" recorded for the Times Record label, was probably the first record produced Ken Khouri. It can be found on the 2002 Rookumbine: Authentic Calypsos and Mentos CD compilation.

=== Albums ===
Swingin' Calypsos, Lord Flea & his Calypsonians (Capitol Records, 1957). Track listing:

- "Shake Shake Sonora"
- "Shi-Du-Bi-Du-Bab"
- "Bachelor's Life"
- "I Can't Cross Over"
- "Out De Fire"
- "Mister Give Me De Rent"
- "Monkey"
- "Love"
- "Calypso Be Bop"
- "Pretty Woman"
- "Magic Composer"
- "Naughty Little Flea"

== See also ==
- Calypsonian
- Jump in the Line (Shake, Senora)
