= U-Roy =

Jamaican musician (1942–2021)

U-Roy OD

Background information
- Also known as: The Originator; Hugh Roy; The Teacher
- Born: Ewart Beckford; 21 September 1942; Jones Town, Jamaica
- Died: 17 February 2021 (aged 78) Kingston, Jamaica
- Genres: Reggae; rocksteady; dancehall; dub
- Occupations: Singer, songwriter
- Years active: 1961–2021
- Labels: Treasure Isle, Duke Reid, Virgin

Ewart Beckford OD (21 September 1942 – 17 February 2021), known by the stage name U-Roy, was a Jamaican vocalist and pioneer of toasting. U-Roy was known for a melodic style of toasting applied with a highly developed sense of timing.

== Early life ==
Ewart Beckford was born in Jones Town, Saint Andrew Parish, Kingston, Jamaica, on 21 September 1942. He was raised within a religious and musical family; his mother was an organist for the choir at a local Seventh-day Adventist church. The sobriquet U-Roy originated from a younger member of his family who found it difficult to pronounce his first name. Beckford attended Denham Town High School in Kingston. As a young man Beckford listened to the music of Louis Prima, James Brown, Ruth Brown, Fats Domino, Rufus Thomas, Smiley Lewis and was especially influenced by the vocal phrasing of Louis Jordan.

== Career ==
Inspired by Count Matchuki, U-Roy started his professional career as a deejay in 1961 on Dickie Wong's sound system (originally called Doctor Dickies later changed to Dickies Dynamic) moving later to the Sir George the Atomic sound system. He then worked on Sir Coxsone Dodd's sound system where he ran the number two set while King Stitt "The Ugly One" ran the main set. This was followed by a period with Sir Percy before he moved to King Tubby's Hometown Hi-Fi sound system. His first single "Dynamic Fashion Way" (1969) was a Keith Hudson production. It was followed by the Lee "Scratch" Perry production "Earth's Rightful Ruler" with Peter Tosh.

While working with the Hometown Hi-Fi sound system in 1969, U-Roy toasted over instrumental dub plates created from existing rocksteady recordings. One such dub plate was a version of the Techniques' "You Don't Care", with Tubby switching from the original vocal recording to the stripped-down rhythm while U-Roy toasted over it. The customized version soon became Hometown Hi-Fi's signature tune.

In 1970, Jamaican singer John Holt (lead vocalist of the Paragons) heard U-Roy toasting over a Duke Reid track at a dance. Holt told Reid about the performance and on his recommendation Reid asked him to come and see him and an informal recording deal was arranged. "Wake the Town" and "Rule the Nation" both topped Jamaica's JBC and RJR charts, and "Wear You to the Ball" subsequently joined them, giving U-Roy the top three positions on both charts simultaneously for several weeks. The success of U-Roy's recordings helped establish deejaying, which had previously been primarily associated with live sound system performances, as a commercially successful recorded form. He went on to work with other major producers on the island including Lee "Scratch" Perry, Bunny Lee, Phil Pratt, Sonia Pottinger, Rupie Edwards, Alvin Ranglin and Lloyd Daley. 1971 saw the release of his deejay version of The Paragons' "The Tide Is High". He first toured the UK in 1972 with the artists Roy Shirley and Max Romeo. The tour was organized by Rita and Benny King, the owners of R & B Records based in Stamford Hill, London.

U-Roy's album Dread in a Babylon was released in the US, Europe and Jamaica by Virgin Records in 1975. The album achieved significant sales in the UK, due in part to the ongoing expansion of the Virgin label and stores. The track "Runaway Girl" from the album was released as a single in Europe that same year. The success of Dread In A Babylon led to a series of Tony Robinson produced albums: Natty Rebel (1976), Rasta Ambassador (1977) and Jah Son Of Africa (1978). His international popularity led to the album Natty Rebel being released in 1976 on Virgin's Front Line label in Nigeria as well as in France on Virgin and Polydor.

U-Roy started his own sound system in 1978, which he named Stur Gav after his sons. The sound system would launch the careers of a younger generation of toasters and singers including Ranking Joe, Jah Screw, Charlie Chaplin and Josey Wales. The pop group Blondie had a world-wide hit with a cover of "The Tide Is High" in 1980, prompting Virgin to re-release the original Paragons' recording from 1967 and the 1971 U-Roy version as a single that same year. His album Pray Fi Di People was released in 2012.

U-Roy was featured on the album True Love by Toots and the Maytals, which won the Grammy Award in 2004 for Best Reggae Album, and showcased many notable musicians including Willie Nelson, Eric Clapton, Jeff Beck, Trey Anastasio, Gwen Stefani / No Doubt, Ben Harper, Bonnie Raitt, Manu Chao, The Roots, Ryan Adams, Keith Richards, Toots Hibbert, Paul Douglas, Jackie Jackson, Ken Boothe, and The Skatalites.

He was awarded the Order of Distinction in 2007 by the Jamaican government for his contribution to music.

His last recording was the song "The Coming of Jah Jah" for the project "The Deejay Battle: Sly & Robbie vs Roots Radics" released in April 2023 produced by the Grammy nominated musician and producer Hernan "Don Camel" Sforzini.

=== U-Roy's music and Rastafari ===
Rastafari has been a feature of U-Roy's lyrics from his earliest singles to his latest album Pray Fi Di People. Beckford's second single "Rightful Ruler" (1969) opens with a profession of Rastafari faith given in the Ethiopian language Amharic:

Kibir amlak (Glory to Jah)
Qedamawi ras fetari (First creator)
Qedamawi iyesus kristos (Holy Jesus Christ)
Lebdama mabrak isad
Tenayistilgn (Greetings)

His "Joyful Locks" (1975) is a DJ version of Linval Thompson's "Don't Cut Off Your Dreadlocks"; an encouragement to others to keep their dreadlocks and to "let it grow". The original song and U-Roy's DJ version both allude to the biblical Samson who as a Nazarite was expected to make certain religious vows including the ritual treatment of his hair as described in Chapter Six of the Book of Numbers:

All the days of the vow of his separation there shall no razor come upon his head: until the days be fulfilled, in the which he separateth himself unto the Lord, he shall be holy, and shall let the locks of the hair of his head grow.

== Death ==
Beckford's death was confirmed on 17 February 2021 when his partner, Marcia Smikle, told the Jamaican newspaper The Gleaner. Trojan Records was also informed about his death. While no cause of death was made public at the time, he suffered from diabetes, hypertension, and problems with his kidneys prior to his death, and had been undergoing surgery at the hospital.

== Legacy ==
Beckford was preceded by the toasters Count Matchuki, King Stitt and Sir Lord Comic who themselves were influenced by the jive talk of the US disc jockeys that they heard on American radio stations whose broadcasts reached the Caribbean. Beckford was the first toaster to popularize the form through a series of successful releases on the Duke Reid label gaining a wider audience for toasting. This approach to production and the remixing of previously recorded tracks with a new vocal influenced the early hip-hop pioneers. Kool Herc states:

"Hip-hop….the whole chemistry of that came from Jamaica…..In Jamaica all you needed was a drum and a bass. So what I did was go right to the ‘yoke’. I cut off all the anticipation and just played the beats. I’d find out where the break in the record was and prolonged it and people would love it. So I was giving them their own taste and beat percussion wise….cause my music is all about heavy bass."

Many internationally known dancehall deejays have acknowledged U-Roy as an influence on their careers, including Sean Paul and Shabba Ranks.

== Album discography ==
- Version Galore (1970)
- Version Galore Vol. 2 (1972)
- U Roy (1974)
- Dread in a Babylon (1975) – produced by Prince Tony Robinson
- Natty Rebel (1976)
- The Best of U Roy (1976)
- Right Time Rockers-The Lost Album (1976)
- African Roots (1976)
- Rasta Ambassador (1977)
- Jah Son of Africa (1978)
- With Words of Wisdom (1979)
- The Originator (1980)
- Love Gamble (1980)
- Line Up and Come (1986)
- Music Addict (1987) - produced by Prince Jazzbo
- True Born African (1991) – produced by Mad Professor
- Smile a While (1993) – produced by Mad Professor
- Babylon Kingdom Must Fall (1996) – produced by Mad Professor
- Reggae Live Sessions Vol-1 (1998)
- Serious Matter (2000)
- Now (2001) – produced by Guillaume Bougard/Pierre Simonin
- Rebel in Styylle (2005) – Mediacom
- Old School/New Rules (2007) – produced by Mad Professor
- Pray Fi Di People (2012) – produced by Ewart Beckford
- Talking Roots (2018) – produced by Mad Professor
- Solid Gold U-Roy (2021)
- Dread In A Africa U-Roy (2022) Jamaican Art Records
- The Deejay Battle: Sly & Robbie vs. Roots Radics feat. Big Youth (2023) Serious Reggae
