= Sir Lord Comic =

- Origin: Jamaica
- Genres: Reggae
- Instrument: Vocals

Sir Lord Comic is one of the original Jamaican deejays.

== Biography ==
His career began as a dancer with the Admiral Dean sound system. In the late 1950s, following the lead of Count Machuki, he began deejaying with the sound system, and recorded what is considered the first deejay recording, "Ska-ing West" in 1966. Comic also recorded one of the last great tracks of the ska era, "The Great Wuga Wuga", in 1967. In addition, Comic recorded the singles "Bronco", "Jack of My Trade", and "Doctor Feelgood". In 1970, he worked with Lee "Scratch" Perry, recording "Django Shoots First" which appeared on the Eastwood Rides Again album. In the early 1980s he was interviewed as part of the Deep Roots Music television series.
