= Mento =

Style of Jamaican folk music

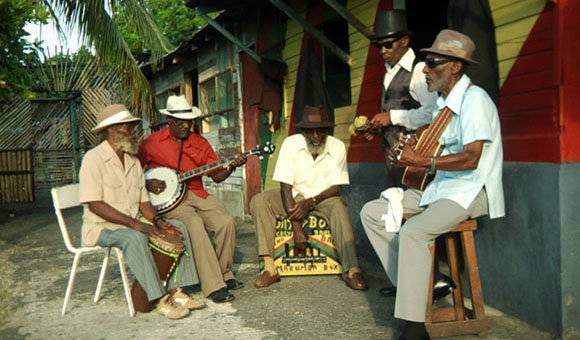
- Popular mento band, the Jolly Boys
- Stylistic origins: African folk music; Jonkunnu music; Kumina; European folk music; Quadrille; Changüí
- Cultural origins: Early-mid 19th century, Jamaica
- Typical instruments: Primary instruments: rumba box; banjo; acoustic guitar; hand drum; Additional instruments: harmonica; maraca; güiro; bamboo flute/fife; graters; fiddle; tambourine; claves
- Derivative forms: Ska

Subgenres
- Ripsaw music

Fusion genres
- Mento-calypso

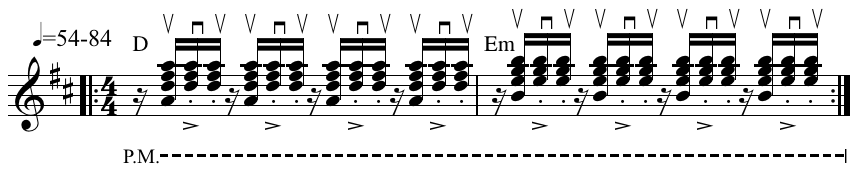
Mento rhythm;

Mento is a style of Jamaican folk music that predates and has greatly influenced ska and reggae music. It is Jamaica’s first commercially recorded music, born out of a fusion of African rhythmic elements and European elements. Mento typically features acoustic instruments, such as acoustic guitar, banjo, hand drums, and the rhumba box—a large mbira in the shape of a box that can be sat on while played. The rhumba box carries the bass part of the music.

Mento is often confused with calypso, a musical form from Trinidad and Tobago. Although the two share many similarities, they are separate and distinct musical forms. The conflation of both genres by the 1950s, due to commercial practices during the international rise of some famous Jamaican mento artists, who helped to pioneer calypso, contributed to the confusion.

== History ==
=== Origin ===
Mento is a distinct acoustic style of traditional or folk music, which originated in Jamaica during the 19th century. It draws on musical traditions from the enslaved Africans brought to the island, along with European folk culture. Enslaved musicians were occasionally required to play music singing European folk songs, which had a significant influence on the development of mento. They were often rewarded for such skills. Thus, this Creole musical genre was created by fusing elements of the said traditions including quadrille, with their own musical rudiments. Some of Jamaica's oldest cultural traditions and dance forms including jonkunnu, quadrille, burru and Maypole, which emerged during slavery and post-emancipation, feature mento music. By the late 1800s and early 1900s, mento had become a clearly recognizable Jamaican folk style and had consolidated as a genre, which reached peak popularity in the 1940s and 1950s.

Noted ethnomusicologist, Dr. Daniel T. Neely, described mento as:

A product of the colonial experience, which emerged from the sufferer classes towards the end of the nineteenth century, produced by people for whom New World African traditions, European dance genres and musical exchange via interregional migration were all influences. It is, without a doubt, one of the most important elements of Jamaica’s cultural heritage.

According to former Prime Minister Edward Seaga, who had researched Jamaica's folk music extensively:

Well, everything originally came from that [the slave plantation system of Jamaica], but over the years there were amalgamations and crossovers – English folk ditties that were absorbed, ring games, quadrille and things like that. So you had a little bit of all that in it. And what really emerged as mento was a combination of the music brought from Africa by the slaves, and that combined with English folks songs and religious material that came out of the United States after the civil war and the great revival, and so on. Mento was very popular in the late 1940s and early to mid-1950s, and used to be played at all the popular nightclubs, including the Silver Slipper in Cross Roads, the Glass Bucket in Half-Way Tree and hotels on the north coast.

=== Etymology ===
The word "mento" is from Cuban Spanish; According to Rex Nettleford, the term was brought back from Cuba by Jamaicans returning from work there. It likely derived from the Spanish verb mentar, meaning "to mention, call out or name", because of the subtle ways that the lyrics have served as social commentary, critiquing individuals (regardless of race or class). Also, while speaking on the history of changüí and mento, ethnomusicologist Ben Lapidus, stated that after the Cuban War of Independence people from Jamaica and Haiti went to Cuba especially the eastern provinces (formerly Oriente), to cut sugarcane. Some would stay, while others returned home, bringing back "things" that led to multiple cross-culturalisation.

=== Instrumentation and characteristics ===
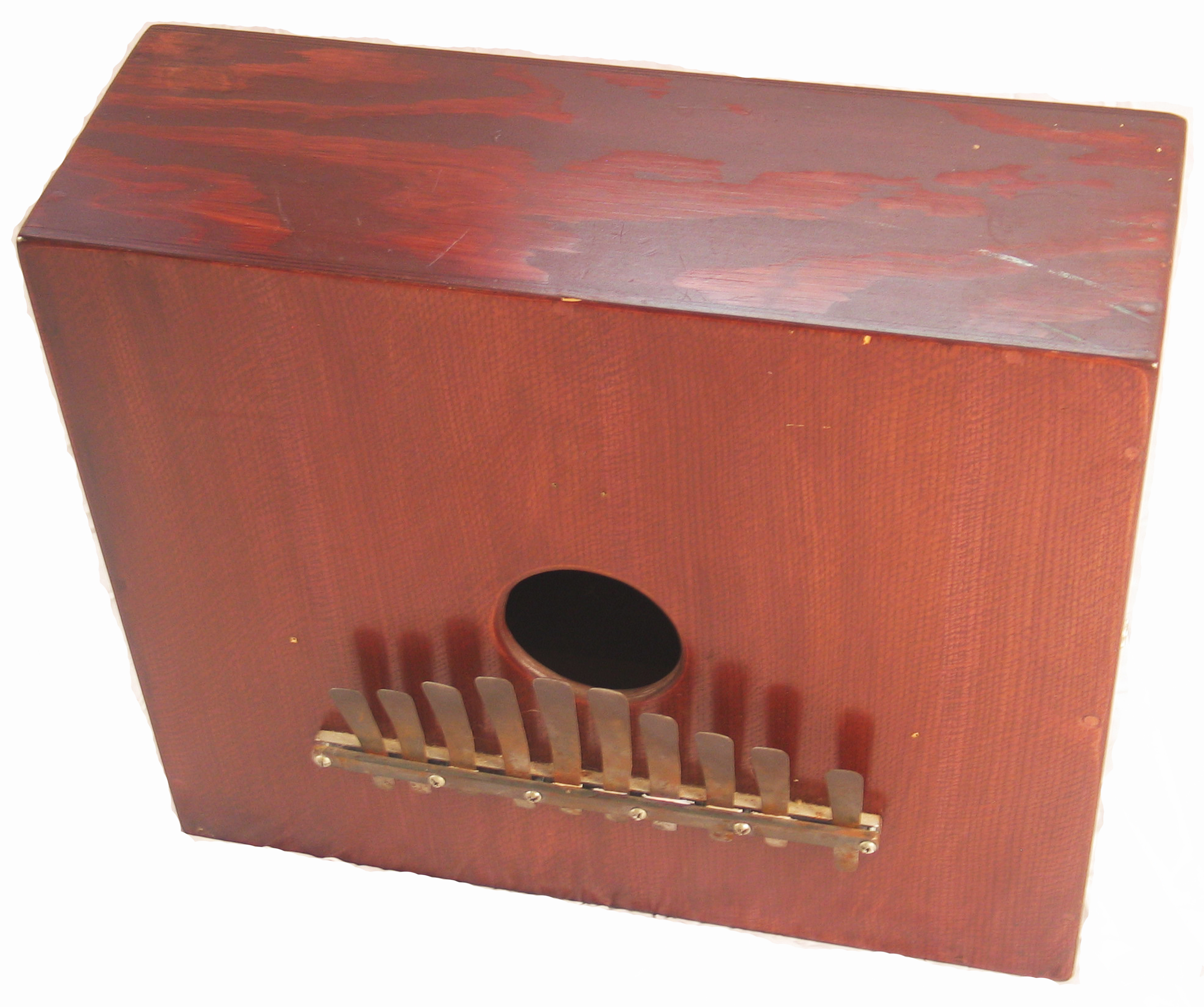
Rumba box from Cuba, used in mento.

Early mento was largely instrumental with syncopated rhythmic patterns, and a gradual transition to incorporate vocals. The music emerged from Jamaica’s predominantly rural agricultural society and was deeply rooted in the planting and harvesting traditions of emancipated Jamaicans. It features call-and-response, African-derived musical instruments such as the banjo and hand drums, as well as European instruments like the acoustic guitar and fiddle. At times, the harmonica, violin, accordion and tambourine are included, though they are later additions to the tradition. Other instruments include the bamboo saxophone and bamboo flute (fife)— bamboo was introducted to Jamaica from Hispaniola in the 18th century, which was used to make musical instruments. While mento’s non-African influences came mainly from English (also Irish/Scottish) traditions, there are also indications of Spanish and indigenous influences, which are supported by the etymology of the term “mento”, as well as the use of the guayo (metal scraper), güiro (gourd scraper) and maraca (shaker)— instruments of indigenous origin, found in similar Greater Antillean genres. Also, claves (rhythm sticks), conga, and most notably, the incorporation of the signature bass box, the marímbula (rumba or rhumba box)— Cuban instruments that were brought to Jamaica, along with a musical style resembling rural Cuban changüí and son cubano. According to ethnomusicologist, Ben Lapidus, archival records show that while cutting cane in Guantánamo, the workers would get permission on the plantations to hold social gatherings, with accounts noting who attended and which bands performed. He also stated:

The Jamaicans took back the marímbula—that's how you get mento. And if you go to Haiti, that's how you get twoubadou—if you look at a video today, it looks like changüí.

=== Conflation with Trinidadian calypso ===
The Jamaican mento style has a long history of conflation with Trinidadian calypso. Both genres also share similar lyrical themes, African call-and-response traditions and storytelling— like calypso, mento uses vibrant lyrics with a humorous slant, commenting on social issues and featuring sexual innuendos. However, there are distinct differences in both genres' historical roots, rudiments, instrumentations, syncopations and song patterns. Between the 1930s and 1950s, mento was conflated and at times blended with calypso. Commercially mento was frequently referred to as calypso, kalypso and mento calypso, particularly following the success of prominent artists like Harry Belafonte, Lord Flea and Byron Lee and the Dragonaires, who popularized calypso internationally.

Calypso was introduced to the North American market earlier than other Caribbean styles, which led to the latter being treated as mere sub-genres. This early exposure gave the musical form a significant advantage, and as a result, the term “calypso” became a kind of catch-all label for Caribbean music internationally. As the genre progressed especially with the addition of horn sets, mento remained more rural in character and comparatively subdued. Calypso gained traction in the Eastern Caribbean before eventually reaching Jamaica, where it was largely embraced by the elite, who perceived it as more polished and internationally appealing than local mento. At the same time, early Jamaican music producers were hesitant to invest in mento, which limited its reach and commercial growth, but some were more willing to produce calypso songs or mento songs rebranded as "calypso" given their established international appeal. With Belafonte’s success, whose debut album of mento songs was named Calypso, the genre dominated the Caribbean music scene. Consequently, hotels began demanding calypso performances, forcing many entertainers to adapt or risk losing work. Therefore, some Jamaican musicians began rebranding their own mento style, and sometimes blended calypso features with it, and as calypso became popular in the Caribbean and among the diaspora in North America, it began to absorb influences from other Caribbean genres, including Jamaican mento.

== Lyrics ==
Mento is often referred to as "country music", due to its lighthearted, simplistic lyrics and the absence of electric instruments. The lyrics of mento songs are described as tropical, while often narrating aspects of everyday life in a witty, playful and humorous way. Many comment on poverty, poor housing, and other social issues. Jamaican cultural identity and pride, the Bible, infidelity as well as, thinly veiled sexual references and innuendos are commonly featured. Mento lyrics were often censored or toned down, especially for commercial recordings and international audiences, but performers used double entendres and humour to navigate social norms and broadcasting restrictions—a defining feature of the genre’s lyrical style. Mento can be seen as a precursor of some of the movement motifs and themes dealing with such social issues found in reggae and modern dancehall.

== Mento musicians ==
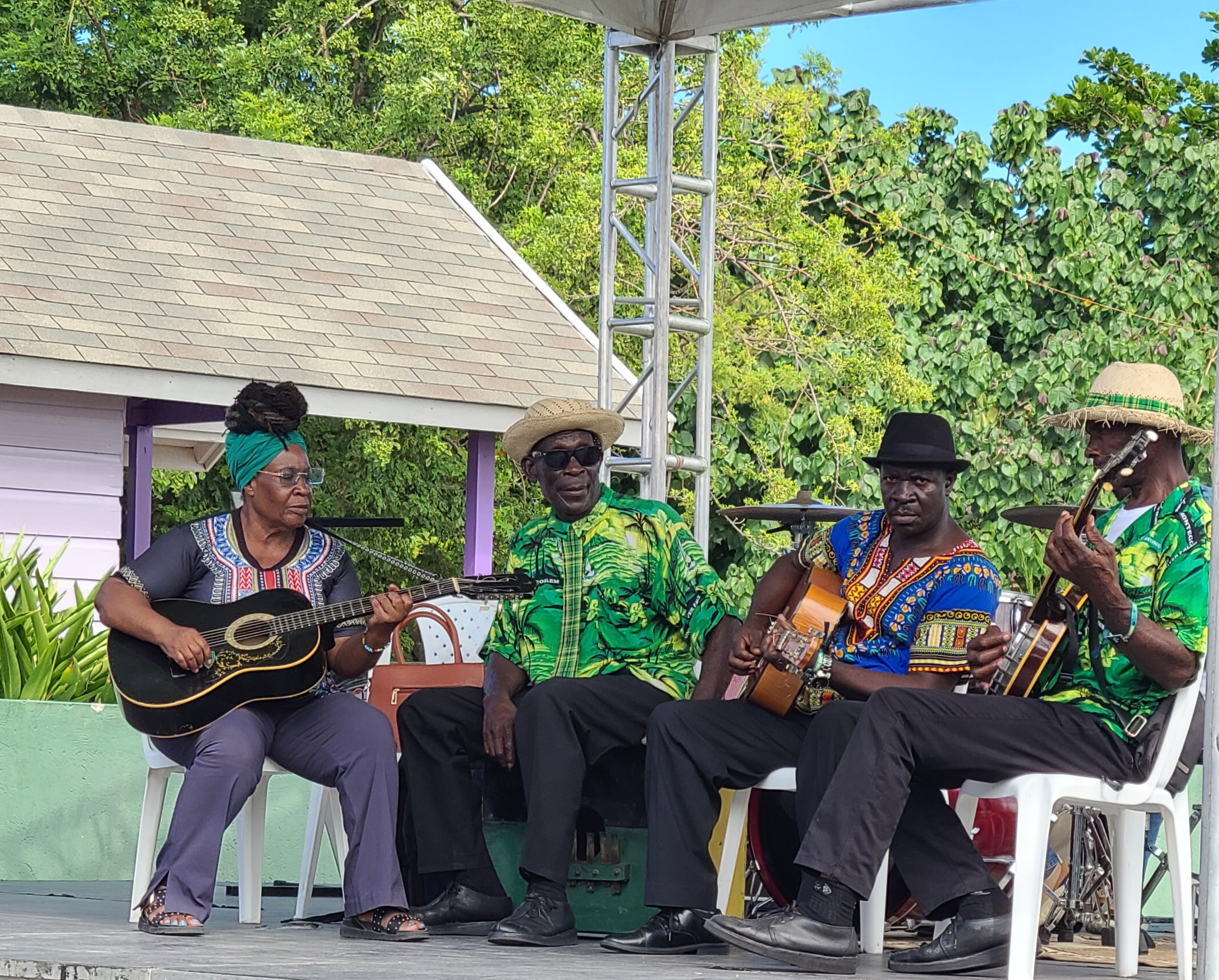
A local mento band from St Catherine performing at a cultural event.

Major 1950s mento recording artists include Louise Bennett, Count Lasher, Count Owen, Harold Richardson, Lord Flea, Lord Fly, Alerth Bedasse with Chin's Calypso Sextet, Laurel Aitken, Denzil Laing, Lord Composer, Lord Lebby, Lord Power, Hubert Porter, and Harry Belafonte, a New Yorker of Jamaican origin. His wildly popular hit records in 1956–1958, including "Day-O (The Banana Boat Song)" and "Jamaica Farewell", were mento songs sold as calypso. Previously recorded Jamaican versions of many Belafonte's classic "calypso" hits can be heard on the Jamaica – Mento 1951–1958 CD released by Frémeaux & Associés in 2009.

Due in part to Belafonte's popularity, mento became widely conflated with calypso in the 1950s. In a 1957 interview for Calypso Star magazine, Lord Flea said:

In Jamaica, we call our music 'mento' until very recently. Today, 'calypso' is beginning to be used for all kinds of West Indian music. This is because it's become so commercialized there. Some people like to think of West Indians as carefree natives who work and sing and play and laugh their lives away. But this isn't so. Most of the people there are hard working folks, and many of them are smart business men. If the tourists want 'calypso', that's what we sell them.

This was the golden age of mento, as records pressed by Stanley Motta, Ivan Chin, Ken Khouri and others brought the music to a new audience. It gained significant popularity in the 1940s and 1950s, with mento performances becoming a common aspect of dances, parties and other cultural events in Jamaica, before being overshadowed by the emergence of ska, rocksteady and reggae in the 1960s. As noted by Alerth Bedasse, leader of the renowned mento ensemble Chin's Calypso Sextet:

We used to get many bookings to perform at parties and set-ups while I still lived in Pennants, Clarendon, before I came to Kingston. People would rock and dance all night to music coming from the most primitive of instruments, such as a bamboo sax, fife, banjo (an instrument resembling a guitar), a rumba box, the maraca (a shaker), and a fork drawn against a grater as a percussion instrument...

Mento is still played in Jamaica, especially at cultural events, during jonkunnu, and in areas frequented by tourists. Lloyd Bradley, reggae historian and author of the seminal reggae book, Bass Culture, said that Lee "Scratch" Perry's seminal 1976 dub album, Super Ape, contained some of the purest mento influences he knew. This style of music was revived in popularity by the Jolly Boys in the late 1980s and early 1990s, with the release of four recordings on First Warning Records/Rykodisc and a tour that included the United States. Stanley Beckford and Gilzene and the Blue Light Mento Band also revived rural mento in the 2000s.

== Selected recordings ==
- Blu-Lu-Lup – Lord Fly
- Healin' in the Balmyard – Harold Richardson & The Ticklers
- Me Dog Can't Bark – Monty Reynolds & The Shaw Park Calypso Band
- Take Her to Jamaica – Lord Messam & His Calypsonians
- Gal a Gully Matilda – Lord Composer & The Silver Seas Hotel Orchestra
- Bargie – Hubert Porter

== Mento dance ==
Mento music is often accompanied by a Jamaican folk-form dance known as mento dance. This lively, informal dance style mirrors the upbeat and expressive essence of the music. The dance is typically characterized by simple, energetic movements, with a focus on rhythm, a bent knee with footwork and hip swaying or pelvic circling. Couples usually dance with loose body contact to the 3-3-2 rhythmic pattern, their footwork resembling a careful balancing act, marked by subtle motions of dips and feints. At its peak, mento dances drew large crowds, fostering togetherness and reinforcing community ties. Typically performed at social or cultural gatherings such as traditional festivals, nine nights, house parties and tea parties, the dance focused more on fun, spontaneous and communal participation than formal technique. Elements of mento dance may be seen in Jamaican quadrille, Maypole and jonkunnu performances.

== Films ==
- 1956: It Can Happen to You, includes a scene of Lord Power and his band playing "Linstead Market"
- 1962: Dr. No: James Bond series, features various mento-style songs. Directed by Terence Young, Written by Ian Fleming
- 1984: Caribbean Crucible. From Repercussions: A Celebration of African-American Music series, program 6. Directed by Dennis Marks and Geoffrey Haydon
- 1988: Beetlejuice, features Harry Belafonte songs rooted in mento and traditional Jamaican folk. Directed by Tim Burton
- 2017/2023: Pimento and Hot Pepper: The Mento Story, a documentary about the roots of Jamaican music, featuring rare archival footage, interviews with experts, and performances by contemporary bands like the Blue Glaze Mento Band and The Jolly Boys. Directed by Richard Elgood, Produced by Bill Monsted and Aida Yohannes
