= The Day the Earth Stood Still (Willie Nile album) =

2021 studio album by Willie Nile

The Day The Earth Stood Still

Studio album by Willie Nile
- Released: August 13, 2021
- Recorded: January 2021
- Venue: Pop rock
- Studios: Hobo Sound, Weehawken, New Jersey, United States
- Length: 40:08
- Label: River House Records
- Producers: Steward Lerman and Willie Nile

Willie Nile chronology
New York at Night (2020)	The Day The Earth Stood Still (2021)	The Great Yellow Light (2025)

The Day The Earth Stood Still is the 14th studio album by American singer-songwriter Willie Nile, released on August 13, 2021, by River House Records, it was co-produced by Nile and Stewart Lerman who has worked with Nile on nine of his previous albums. Grammy Award-winning musician Steve Earle is a guest artist on this album.

== Background ==
Upon seeing the deserted streets and boarded up stores of New York City because of COVID-19, Nile was reminded of scenes from the 1951 sci-fi movie The Day the Earth Stood Still. Nile uses the phrase "Klaatu barada nikto" in the chorus of the title track of the album. Drawing from his Covid lockdown experiences, in June 2020, he began writing songs for the album.

A few years earlier, Nile had been introduced to Congressman John Lewis by Nile's friend, Congressman Joe Crowley. Lewis died on July 17, 2020. Nile and Frankie Lee wrote Justice Bell in honor of Lewis and his band recorded it, coincidentally, on January 6, 2021, the day of the United States Capitol attack.

Nile says "Blood on Your Hands" is a song about dancing with the devil. "If you dance with the devil you can get blood on your hands". Nile invited his friend and neighbor Steve Earle to join him on that song.

"Way of the Heart" was recorded in 2009 and brought out as an ending for this album.

Photographer Cristina Arrigoni photographed New York City street performer John Figueroa-Gonzalez for the cover photo and other photos in the album.

== Critical reception ==
Professional ratings
Review scores
Source	Rating
American Songwriter	4.5/5 stars
PopMatters	8/10 stars
Elmore	90/100
Glide Magazine	90/100
Folk/Tumble	4/5 stars
Spectrum Culture	3.4/5 stars

Jon Blistein of Rolling Stone says ""Blood on Your Hands" is a steady stomping rock cut that finds Nile and Earle trading searing verses about human nature's more sinister qualities".

John Amen in No Depression: "A project that oozes an ebullient ’70s-rock-and-pop vibe, the 73-year-old delivering some of the more infectious songs of his career".

Richard Marcus from Blogcritics: The Day The Earth Stood Still shows Nile to be as versatile as ever. Equally at home rocking the house down as he is singing an intimate song from behind his piano, he lives up to his reputation as one of the troubadours of our times. This is a great album of timely and intelligent music from a heartfelt and aware songwriter."

Lee Zimmerman from American Songwriter: "The Day The Earth Stood Still easily measures up to every one of Nile's preceding efforts — taut, tough, and tenacious, and driven by sheer grit and gravitas, as well as passion and purpose."

Steve Horowitz in PopMatters says "Nile is a national treasure who brings rock to the masses, and while he may sing about The Day the Earth Stood Still because of the recent pandemic, he's still moving and grooving."

Gene Knapp from Elmore Magazine wrote: "Nile uses his masterful way with words to epitomize the world in its greatness and its fallacies".

Jim Hynes writes in Glide Magazine: "Nile is one of the best combinations of songwriter and rocker we’ve had over the past three decades and his albums seem to get progressively better each time out."

Damian McNairney opines in Folk/Tumble: "Anyone fortunate enough to witness Willie Nile perform live will know that he delivers an energetic show of street smart rock and roll that never fails to leave his audience with a smile on their faces".

New York City reviewer Kevin Korber in Spectrum Culture writes: "The Day the Earth Stood Still can remind us of the kind of power that style can have in the hands of a craftsman like Willie Nile."

John Apice writes in Americana Highways; "His latest polished, personal & powerful 11-cut The Day The Earth Stood Still is filled with brilliant songs, & literate lyrics".

Darryl Sterdan of Tinnitist: "The veteran New York rocker kicks up his heels with a raucous, high-energy outing. Willie Nile has tapped into his own lockdown experience as a source of inspiration for the set of haunting new songs that comprise his emotion-charged new release".

From the UK, Mark Engleson in Lyric Magazine says: "Nile is a powerfully topical songwriter, one of the great chronicles of twenty-first American life and society, and of his adopted home city. His writing crackles with intelligence, passion, and insight, and his music is rock n’ roll of the first stripe."

== Track listing ==
The Day the Earth Stood Still track listing
No.	Title	Writer(s)	Guest artist(s)	Length
1.	"The Day the Earth Stood Still"	Willie Nile		3:58
2.	"Sanctuary"	Nile, Marc Jonson		3:41
3.	"Where There's a Willie There's a Way"	Nile, Michael Des Barres		2:54
4.	"Blood on Your Hands"	Nile	Steve Earle	3:43
5.	"The Justice Bell (for John Lewis)"	Nile, Frankie Lee		3:49
6.	"Expect Change"	Nile		3:42
7.	"I Don't Remember You"	Nile		2:48
8.	"Off My Medication"	Nile		3:53
9.	"I Will Stand"	Nile		3:49
10.	"Time to Be Great"	Nile		3:36
11.	"Way of the Heart"	Nile, Lee		4:15

== Personnel ==
Musicians

- Willie Nile – electric & acoustic guitars, piano, vocals
- Jimi K. Bones – electric & acoustic guitars, percussion / loops
- Johnny Pisano – bass, backing vocals
- Jon Weber – drums, percussion
- Andy Burton – Hammond B3, piano, glockenspiel
- Steve Earle – vocal on Blood On Your Hands
- James Maddock – backing vocals
- Joe Crowley – backing vocals
- Frankie Lee – backing vocals, percussion
- Marc Jonson – backing vocals, piano, tubular bells, glockenspiel
- Stewart Smith – electric guitar on Way of The Heart
- Steward Lerman – bass on Way of The Heart

Production and additional personnel

- Produced by Stewart Lerman and Willie Nile
- Executive Producer: Kevin Collins, Rob Steele
- Associate Producer: Big Jer LaPorte (for Barry), Mark A. Moore
- Engineered and Mixed by James Frazee and Steward Lerman at Hobo Sound, Weehawken, NJ
- Mastered by Greg Calbi at Sterling Sound, Edgewater, NJ
- Additional Production and Engineering by Jimi K. Bones at JonesBones Studios, NYC
- Recorded at Hobo Sound, Weehawken, NJ
- Photography – Cristina Arrigoni at CristinaArrigoniphotography.com
- Art direction – Deborah Maniaci
- Photo of John Lewis by Dominick Titino
- Media – Cary Baker
- Radio – Brad Hunt
- Booking – Adam Bauer
