= New York at Night (album) =

Studio album by Willie Nile
- Released: May 15, 2020
- Studio: Hobo Sound
- Genre: Pop rock
- Length: 45:00
- Label: River House Records
- Producers: Stewart Lerman; Willie Nile

Willie Nile chronology
Children of Paradise (2018)	New York at Night (2020)	The Day the Earth Stood Still (2021)

New York at Night is the 13th studio album by American singer-songwriter Willie Nile, released on May 15, 2020, by River House Records, it was co-produced by Nile and Stewart Lerman who has worked with Nile on eight of his previous albums.

The record celebrates family, unity and the city Nile has called home since the early 1970s.

== Background ==
Nile says the idea for the name, New York at Night, came to him one Friday night in the summer of 2018, when he was walking alone near Times Square to catch a subway. When he got on the train he saw a man all covered in thick whipped cream. After he exited the train he saw all sorts of characters on the street in Greenwich Village. As he continued his walk home, he thought "New York at night, wow, what a name for a song". After he got home he picked up his guitar and wrote the song. Most of the songs are New York inspired but it is not a concept album. Nile says "What all the songs on this album have in common is that they reflect my life and experiences living in New York."

Nile recorded "Run Free" in 2003 with his band, at the time, The Worry Dolls, but it was never previously released. "Surrender the Moon" is a song started by Nile's brother John Noonan who died a year after starting the song in 2007. Nile finished the song for this album. Nile co-wrote "New York is Rockin'" with Curtis Stigers for Stigers' 1995 album Time Was.

In February 2020 Nile announced plans to release his 13th studio album in 2020. On his own website he took advance orders for digital downloads, CDs, signed lyrics and other merchandise to raise funds to produce the album. In a March 2020 interview by Jam Band News, Nile said ""I like the independent world." "There are no constraints and you can work at your own speed. I’ve no complaints about having been on major labels. I was on two of them and I was able to do what I wanted to do. But things have changed so much in the music business that being independent allows for so many more options." Nile has employed similar crowdfunding campaigns for five of his previous albums.

The release of New York at Night coincides with the 40th anniversary of Nile's self-titled debut album, which was released in 1980.

== Critical reception ==
Professional ratings
Review scores
Source	Rating
American Songwriter	3.5/5 stars
AllMusic	3.5/5 stars
Elmore	8.8/10.0 stars
Kronen Zeitung	9.0/10.0 stars
Power Popaholic	8.0/10.0 stars

=== In the United States ===
- Hal Horowitz, of American Songwriter, says of Nile; "His rugged outside shell is just a leather jacket over the soul of a sensitive and honest musician with an enthusiasm for rock and roll that beats like the jackhammers punctuating the air of the city he loves".
- In AllMusic, Mark Deming wrote; "It's smart, exciting, and hot-wired rock & roll from a guy who clearly knows plenty about his city and his music, and it's a reminder that he's one of the best rockers New York has left."
- Lou Montesano reports in Elmore Magazine; New York at Night is a tribute to the city's strength, energy and will to endure — just like Willie Nile himself."
- John Moore, in a Glide Magazine review of the album said, "Nile has stuck to a template of rock, shunning all prefixes, and dodging musical trends that puts him up there with Springsteen and Dylan."
- Pablo Gorondi of the Associated Press says, "Albums like New York at Night show that Nile still has all it takes to be a radio star, and more."
- Rock & Roll Globe's Katherine Yeske Taylor wrote, "Nile and his band are known for putting on extraordinarily energetic and uplifting concerts, and they’ve managed to capture this same vibe on New York at Night".
- PopMatters says Under This Roof is "a tender ballad that exhibits Nile's knack for embracing the human condition....an anthem for belonging in an era of isolation".
- New York City music host Paul Cavalconte of WFUV says, "A rockin’ new Willie Nile album! New York at Night finds the native son and scribe writing as sharply as ever".
- Richard Marcus writing in online magazine Blogcritics says; "This is a great album from a wonderful musician and should take pride of place in everybody's NYC music section".
- Steve Wosahia, writing in digital magazine Americana Highways says "Nile’s new album and it's [sic] cinematic title track captures all of the magnificence and historical rhythm of a city that never sleeps".
- From blogger The Fat Angel Sings: "From the rockabilly-toned "New York Is Rockin'" to the Irish flavor incorporated into "Lost & Lonely World" and the reflective "Doors Of Paradise" and "A Little Bit Of Love", Nile has produced one of his best albums to date."
- Web blogger Michael Dothery, in his Music Log, says; "With this release, Willie Nile again proves he is one of the absolute best artists going these days."
- Audiophile Review's Mark Smotroff states "on New York At Night Willie Nile continues his home-run-hitting string of great albums that mine that well worn corner of pure Rock and Roll and street-wise soul spirit."
- In the March 2020 edition of DownBeat Magazine, Bobby Reed calls the album "a sonic love letter to the Gotham" and adds "Big Apple residents definitely will experience a jolt of recognition when listening to veteran rocker Willie Nile’s 13th studio album, New York At Night."
- Camile Conte, in her May 22, 2020 Apple podcast, calls New York at Night "a masterpiece of a new album"
- The album was "highly recommended" by Power Popaholic who said "Nile's ballads are stylistically comparable to Bruce Springsteen".
- Twangville readers chose New York at Night as their favorite new release for the week of May 15, 2020.
- Bill Bliss of Southern California's Rage Monthly, in the June 2020 edition, recommends New York at Night and adds "Let’s just say his new music is extremely timely and poignant to hear and reflect upon, and it is rocking out in the finest way. Take a bite of it and enjoy his unique talent and a skilled band of musicians. As Willie sings in another track and it rings true, it’s "A Little Bit of Love."
- New York at Night was listed in rock nyc as one of the best albums of 2020.
- Allen Scully for The Morning Call wrote "(Billy) Joel would be hard pressed to come close to match Nile’s pedigree for his affection for the city that never sleeps" and added New York at Night is a good place to start discovering one of rock's most under-appreciated talents."

=== From Canada ===
- Canadian Darryl Sterdan, in Tinnitist writes; "The troubadour reminds you there are some guys who stay true to themselves. Death, taxes and Willie Nile, you can count on all three of them".

=== From the United Kingdom ===
- James Daykin of UK's Lyric Magazine wrote, "An album that drenches the listener in the romance of the Big Apple."

=== From Europe ===
- In Italy, Roots Highway calls the album "an electric ode to a wounded city" and adds "unquestionably one of his best career albums".
- Austria's Kronen Zeitung reports "Nile succeeds in one of the most beautiful love confessions of the year. New York at Night is a single jewel from an album that is exciting, emotional and life affirming."
- From the Netherlands, Fons Delemarre writes in Bluestown Music, "So the Springsteen rockers and the Garland Jeffreys-esque tunes will blow your mind, alternately varied with power ballads. In those ballads it is striking that Nile has mastered the Dylanesque singing well, including a rhyme scheme cast in concrete. That link to Dylan is not surprising, because in 2017 Nile already made a beautiful album of Dylan covers. Nile has a good pen for writing anthems - nice, "big" songs, with a high content of catchy sing-along pieces. Lovers of Springsteen, Dylan, Ian Hunter, Chuck Prophet, Garland Jeffreys and Little Steven who want to hear something different, that must sound the same at the same time."

== Track listing ==
No.	Title	Writer(s)	Length
1.	"New York is Rockin'"	Nile, C. Stigers	3:39
2.	"The Backstreet Slide"	Nile	3:50
3.	"Doors of Paradise"	Nile, F. Lee	4:06
4.	"Lost and Lonely World"	Nile, F. Lee	4:05
5.	"The Fool Who Drank the Ocean"	Nile, F. Lee	3:35
6.	"A Little Bit of Love"	Nile	3:57
7.	"New York at Night"	Nile	3:21
8.	"The Last Time We Made Love"	Nile	4:18
9.	"Surrender the Moon"	Nile, J. Noonan	3:20
10.	"Under This Roof"	Nile, F. Lee	3:24
11.	"Downtown Girl"	Nile	3:03
12.	"Run Free"	Nile, F. Lee	4:22
Total length:			45:00

== Personnel ==
Musicians

- Willie Nile – electric guitar, piano, Glockenspiel, vocals
- Johnny Pisano – bass, tabla, backing vocals
- Matt Hogan – electric guitar, keyboards
- Jon Weber – drums, tambourine
- Steuart Smith – electric & acoustic guitar, Wurlitzer, Hammond B-3, hammer piano
- Jimi K. Bones – electric & acoustic guitar, additional drum programming
- Stewart Lerman – acoustic guitar, synth
- Brian Mitchell – piano
- Frankie Lee – tambourine, shaker, tabla, backing vocals
- James Maddock – backing vocals

Run Free personnel

- Andy York – guitar
- Brad Albetta – bass
- Rich Pagano – drums
- Chris Palmaro – piano & organ
- Tawatha Agee & Vaneese Thomas – backing vocals
- Engineered & Mixed by Hoover Li at JSM Music, New York City

Production and additional personnel

- Produced by Stewart Lerman and Willie Nile
- Executive Producer: Kevin Collins, Rob Steele
- Associate Producer: Barry LaPorte, Mark A. Moore
- Mixed by Stewart Lerman at Hobo Sound, Weehawken, NJ
- Mastered by Greg Calbi at Sterling Sound, Edgewater, NJ
- Engineered by James Frazee at Hobo Sound, Weehawken, NJ
- Additional Engineering by Jimi K. Bones, Matt Hogan, Brian McGee
- Recorded at Hobo Sound, Weehawken, NJ
- Photography – Cristina Arrigoni at CristinaArrigoniphotography.com
- Art direction – Deborah Maniaci
- Media – Cary Baker
- Radio – Brad Hunt
- Booking – Adam Bauer

== Release history ==
Country	Date	Label	Format
United States	May 15, 2020	River House Records	Digital download; CD
United States	June 19, 2020	River House Records	LP
