= Children of Paradise (Willie Nile album) =

Studio album by Willie Nile
- Released: 27 July 2018
- Recorded: February–April 2018
- Genre: Indie rock
- Length: 43:20
- Label: River House Records
- Producers: Stewart Lerman, Willie Nile

Willie Nile chronology
Positively Bob: Willie Nile Sings Bob Dylan (2017)	Children of Paradise (2018)	New York at Night (2020)

Professional ratings
Review scores
Source	Rating
All About Music	8.5/10 stars
AllMusic	4/5 stars
American Songwriter	4/5 stars
Cashbox	4/5 stars
The Daily Vault	A−
Elmore	9.0/10.0 stars
Glide Magazine	9/10 stars
Read Junk	4.5/5 stars

Children of Paradise is the twelfth studio album by American singer and songwriter Willie Nile. It was released on 27 July 2018 by River House Records. Nile says of the album, "The music always lifts my spirits, and that's what these songs do for me and it's why I wrote them. Hopefully they can lift others’ spirits as well." "I believe in the basic goodness of most people, and that's where these songs come from."

== Background ==
On 24 February 2018, Nile posted a video on PledgeMusic announcing his upcoming album. Nile said that he had been doing a lot of songwriting and that he was going to make a studio album of all original material. Nile dedicated the album to his longtime friend Andrew Dorff who co-wrote Lookin’ For Someone. Dorff died unexpectedly at age 40 shortly after the song was written.

== Critical reviews ==
Associated Press’ Kiley Armstrong says it is "his best album to date". In a July 2018 review of the album Audiophile says "Willie Nile has a lot to say and clearly some great songs in his back pocket. You just need to listen. If you have even a bit of conscience remaining, you should listen to Willie's albums of the last 10 years or so. You might just get inspired by his 21st century renaissance." Lee Zimmerman writes in Paste "A new waive of politically charged music from Nile. With its cascading choruses, rousing refrains and cover photos of some of the homeless people that inhabit his neighborhood, Children of Paradise serves as his own call to arms." Rock nyc says "a brilliant collection of punk-folk attitude songs, politically astute and sweet and sour at the same time as he adds the subjective to the objective".

== Track listing ==
No.	Title	Writer(s)	Length
1.	"Seeds of A Revolution"	Nile	4:12
2.	"All Dressed Up And No Place to Go"	Nile	3:24
3.	"Don't"	Nile	3:17
4.	"Earth Blues"	Nile	3:16
5.	"Children of Paradise"	Nile, Briley	4:31
6.	"Getting’ Ugly Out There"	Nile	3:54
7.	"I Defy"	Nile, Frankie Lee	2:53
8.	"Have I Ever Told You"	Nile	3:43
9.	"Secret Weapon"	Nile	3:33
10.	"Lookin’ For Someone"	Nile, Andrew Dorff	3:59
11.	"Rock N’ Roll Sister"	Nile	2:33
12.	"All God's Children"	Nile	4:05
Total length:			43:20

== Personnel ==
Musicians

- Willie Nile – acoustic and electric guitars, piano, vocals
- Johnny Pisano – bass, backing vocals
- Matt Hogan – electric guitar
- Jon Weber – drum
- Steuart Smith – acoustic and electric guitars, mandolin, harmonium, Hammond B3, Wurlitzer, glockenspiel
- Andy Burton – Hammond B3
- Frankie Lee – tambourine, backing vocals
- James Maddock – backing vocals
- Leslie Mendelson – backing vocals

Production and additional personnel

- Produced by Stewart Lerman and Willie Nile
- Executive Producer: Kevin Collins
- Associate Producer: Barry LaPorte
- Engineered by James Frazee and Stewart Lerman
- Mixed by Stewart Lerman
- Recorded at Hobo Sound, Weehawken, NJ
- Mastering by Greg Calbi at Sterling Sound, NYC
- Art direction – Deborah Maniaci
- Photography – Cristina Arrigoni at CristinaArrigoniphotography.com
- Legal – Terri Baker, Esq
- Media – Cary Baker – conqueroo.com
- Booking – Adam Bauer at Madison-House Agency

== Charts ==
Chart (2018)	Peak position
US Heatseekers Albums (Billboard)	6
US Independent Albums (Billboard)	23

== Release history ==
Country	Date	Label	Format
United States	27 July 2018	River House Records	Digital download; CD
