= The Great Yellow Light =

2025 studio album by Willie Nile

Studio album by Willie Nile
- Released: June 20, 2025
- Studios: Hobo Sound, Weehawken, New Jersey, United States
- Genres: Pop music, rock music
- Length: 40:41
- Label: River House Records
- Producers: Steward Lerman and Willie Nile

Willie Nile chronology
The Day the Earth Stood Still (2020)	The Great Yellow Light (2025)

The Great Yellow Light is the 15th studio album by American singer-songwriter Willie Nile. Released on June 21, 2025, by River House Records, it was co-produced by Nile and Stewart Lerman who has worked with Nile on ten of his previous albums. Grammy Award-winning musician Steve Earle and Northern Ireland singer/songwriter Paul Brady are guest artist on this album.

== Background ==
Nile was inspired to write The Great Yellow Light by a letter that Vincent Van Gogh wrote to his brother Theo. Van Gogh wrote nearly 700 letters to his brother but one in particular, which Van Gogh wrote when he lived in Arles in the South of France, caught Nile's eye. Van Gogh wrote "How beautiful yellow is" referring to the bright sunlight. Nile said that for him the great yellow light represents awe and wonder

== Critical reception ==
Professional ratings
Review scores
Source	Rating
Americana UK	9/10 stars
Maximum Volumn Music	9/10 stars
MOJO Magazine	4/5 stars
That Devil Music	A+

The Great Yellow Light was awarded album of the week status by Tinnitist music and cultural website on June 19, 2025.

In the May 2025 edition of Bentley's Bandstand, Bill Bentley opines "This is a true blue rocker who will never give up, never turn out the lights and never quit trying to make music that helps change the world. Willie Nile’s twenty-first album is as strong as anything he’s ever recorded.

Stephen Rapid of Lonesome Highway says "It is an album that is evidence that Willie Nile is still in the game and leading from the front and further affirmation to the notion that he is to New York what Bruce Springsteen is to Jersey"

In Louder Magazine David Steinfeld says "He's up there with Paul McCartney and Bob Dylan: New York rock'n'roller Willie Nile on Vincent Van Gogh, Irish goodbyes and the greatest songwriter you never heard of".

Tina Benitez-Eves in American Songwriter says "The Great Yellow Light is one of Nile’s most comprehensive letters on life, the end, and all of the expectancies in the middle".

Hannah Means-Shannon of Glide Magazine said of the album "Steeped in inquisitive songwriting as his albums always are, Nile’s The Great Yellow Light also captures a certain flame of positivity that seems so embattled these days".

In a Musocribe review, Bill Kopp reports "On The Great Yellow Light, Nile rocks in an energetic and melodic fashion. With The Great Yellow Light he may have just made the finest album of his career".

In a review of the album by John Apice of American Highways, Apice says "This puts Nile in that respectable space occupied by Bruce Springsteen & Billy Falcon ("Heaven’s Highest Hill")".

Bandcamp: "The Great Yellow Light is filled with passionate guitar-driven, melodic songs, a mix of anthemic rockers and sensitive ballads with a subtle socio-political message throughout".

Geoff Wilber "Every song on this record is unique and original...Willie Nile is a meticulous, versatile singer-songwriter and dynamic performer, and this shows throughout his latest album".

Greame Tait of Americana UK summarised the album by writing "With The Great Yellow Light, Nile has delivered an album for the times that can proudly stand alongside the best of his great canon of work and provides ample proof that even at 77 years of age and over 45 years as a recording artist, he is still very much at the top of his game".

Music journalist Chris Griffy in a Concert Hopper review states "If you like old school garage rock and roll in the middle ground between “Dylan goes electric” and the blue collar anthems of Bruce Springsteen (himself an avowed Nile fan), then The Great Yellow Light is an album you're going to want to own.

== Track listing ==
The Great Yellow Light track listing
No.	Title	Writer(s)	Guest artist(s)	Length
1.	"Wild Wild World"	Willie Nile		4:00
2.	"We Are, We Are"	Nile, Frankie Lee		3:06
3.	"Electrify Me"	Nile		3:00
4.	"An Isish Goodbye"	Nile	Paul Brady	3:32
5.	"The Great Yellow Light"	Nile		6:17
6.	"Tryin' To Make A Livin' in the U.S.A."	Nile		3:05
7.	"Fall On Me"	Nile, Frankie Lee		3:58
8.	"What Color Is Love"	Nile, Frankie Lee		3:59
9.	"Wake Up America"	Nile	Steve Earle	4:13
10.	"Washington's Day"	Nile, Rob Hyman, Eric Bazilian, Rick Chertoff		5:31

== Personnel ==
Musicians

- Willie Nile – electric guitar, piano, vocals
- Jimi K. Bones – electric & acoustic guitars, backing vocals
- Johnny Pisano – bass, backing vocals
- Jon Weber – drums
- Paul Brady - vocals on "An Irish Goodbye"
- Steve Earle – vocals on Wake Up America
- James Maddock – backing vocals
- Rob Hyman - Farfisa, Hammond B-3, accordion, piano,backing vocals (1,4,6,8,10)
- Eric Bazilian - mandola, electric 6 & 12 string guitars, backing vocals (6,10)
- Andy Burton – keyboards, piano, Hammond M-3 (3,5,7)
- Waddy Wachtel - electric guitar (9)
- Fred Parcells - tin whistle, trombone (4)
- Chris Byrne - uilleann pipes, bodhran (4)
- David Mansfield - mandolin (4)
- Larry Kirwan - backing vocals (4)
- James Frazee - percussion

Production and additional personnel

- Produced by Stewart Lerman and Willie Nile
- Executive Producer: Mark A. Moore, Jeffrey Rinde, Rob Steele
- Associate Producer: Kevin Collins, Stacey Jaye, Jerry & Barry La Porte, David Oden, Jeff Schneider
- Engineered and Mixed by James Frazee and at Hobo Sound, Weehawken, NJ
- Mastered by Greg Calbi at Sterling Sound, Edgewater, NJ
- Additional Production and Engineering by Jimi Bones at JonesBones Studios, NYC
- Additional Engineering by Brendan McGeehan at Elm Street Studio, Conshohocken, PA
- Photos by Cristina Arrigoni
- Art direction – Deborah Maniaci
- Photo of Willie in studio by David Oden
- Media – Howard Wuelfing
- Radio – Brad Hunt
- Booking – Adam Bauer
