= Positively Bob: Willie Nile Sings Bob Dylan =

Compilation album by Willie Nile
- Released: 23 June 2017
- Genre: Pop rock
- Length: 37:41
- Label: River House Records
- Producer: Stewart Lerman; Willie Nile

Willie Nile chronology
World War Willie (2016)	Positively Bob: Willie Nile Sings Bob Dylan (2017)	Children of Paradise (2018)

Positively Bob: Willie Nile Sings Bob Dylan is the eleventh studio album by American singer and songwriter Willie Nile. It was released on 23 June 2017 by River House Records. The album is a tribute to Bob Dylan and his music. Nile says of the music, "These songs meant the world to me when I was younger and they mean the world to me now. The mystic leap of faith it took to write them, and the courage it took to believe and make a stand in hopes for something better, makes my heart sing and wander now as it did when I first heard them".

== Background ==
In March 2017, Nile announced that he would be doing a new album of nothing but Bob Dylan covers. Nile's participation in performing four songs at a 75th birthday Dylan tribute show at NY City's Winery in May 2016, planted the seed for Positively Bob. Nile called on James Maddock, who had accompanied him at the City Winery Tribute, for guitar and background vocals, Spin Doctors member Aaron Comess on drums, and longtime Nile band members Matt Hogan and Johnny Pisano to round out the team. The recordings were made at Comess' Brooklyn studio, His House - Insbruck Studio.

== Critical reception ==
Professional ratings
Review scores
Source	Rating
AllMusic	4/5 stars
Glide Magazine	8/10 stars

Nile got the ultimate seal of approval for his album of Bob Dylan covers when Dylan told his online followers to "check out" Nile's record. "Willie brings his distinctive 1970s punk-meets-folk attitude to a great collection of songs", Dylan's Facebook page advised.
Music historian and critic, Rev. Keith A. Gordon says "Nile honors the Master with ten brilliant musical portraits that capture Dylan’s essence while staying true to Nile’s own unique and always-evolving muse.
J. Poet, in "Magnet Magazine", wrote "The ardent energy that marks Willie Nile’s best work is in full effect on this tribute to the greatest songwriter of the 20th century.
Pablo Gorondi, of The Associated Press, writes "Nile is too good and sincere to merely imitate Dylan and pays his highest compliment by performing the 10 songs as if they were his".

== Track listing ==
All songs, words and music, written by Bob Dylan.

1. "The Times They Are a-Changin'" (3:20)
2. "Rainy Day Women ♯12 & 35" (3:21)
3. "Blowin' in the Wind" (3:50)
4. "A Hard Rain's a-Gonna Fall" (3:56)
5. "I Want You" (3:34)
6. "Subterranean Homesick Blues" (2:35)
7. "Love Minus Zero/No Limit" (3:11)
8. "Every Grain of Sand" (3:53)
9. "You Ain't Goin' Nowhere" (3:49)
10. "Abandoned Love" (4:12)

== Personnel ==
Musicians

- Willie Nile – acoustic guitar, vocals
- James Maddock – acoustic and electric guitar, backing vocals
- Matt Hogan – electric guitar
- Johnny Pisano – bass guitar, backing vocals
- Andy Burton – piano, organ, Wurly, Vox Continental, synth
- Aaron Comess – drums
- Frankie Lee – tambourine & shaker
- Leslie Mendelson – backing vocals

Production and additional personnel

- Produced by Stewart Lerman and Willie Nile
- Executive Producer: K.C. Fitzgerald
- Associate Producer: Andrew Fitzsimmons
- Engineered by Roman Klun and Stewart Lerman
- Recorded at His House-Insbruck Studios, Brooklyn, NY
- Mixed by Stewart Lerman at Hobo Sound, Weehawken, NJ
- Mastering by Greg Calbi at Sterling Sound, NYC
- Art direction – Deborah Maniaci
- Photography – Cristina Arrigoni at CristinaArrigoniphotography.com
- Legal – Terri Baker, Esq
- Media – Cary Baker – conqueroo.com
- Booking – Adam Bauer at Madison-House Agency

== Charts ==
Chart (2017)	Peak position
US Heatseekers Albums (Billboard)	11
US Independent Albums (Billboard)	32

== Release history ==
Country	Date	Label	Format
United States	23 June 2017	River House Records	Digital download; CD
