= If I Was a River (album) =

Studio album by Willie Nile
- Released: November 11, 2014
- Genre: Folk rock
- Length: 33:52
- Label: River House; Blue Rose
- Producer: Stewart Lerman; Willie Nile

Willie Nile chronology
American Ride (2013)	If I Was a River (2014)	World War Willie (2016)

Professional ratings
Review scores
Source	Rating
AllMusic	3.5/5 stars
The Daily Vault	B+
Melodic.net	4.63/5
Musikreviews.de	13/15
PopMatters	8/10 stars
ReadJunk	4/5 stars
Soundz Magazine	4/5 stars
Uncut	8/10 stars

If I Was a River is the ninth studio album from American singer-songwriter Willie Nile. The all-piano album was released in November 2014 under River House Records. Nile recorded If I Was a River on the same Steinway grand piano that he played the night John Lennon was killed, December 8, 1980. Nile was in Studio "A" at The Record Plant in New York City making Golden Down and John and Yoko were working on "Walking on Thin Ice" in Studio C that night.

== Critical reception ==
If I Was a River has been positively received and has had favorable reviews.
Uncut critic Luke Torn wrote: "Intimate, understated gem from New York City's unofficial poet laureate".
Pop Matters writer Steve Horowitz writes "Nile knows we have a river of love within that connects us to others.....
He doesn’t intellectualize it. Instead, Nile gently draws this from us through his music."
Peter Gerstenzang, in The Village Voice, wrote "Nile has a strong command of the keys, embellishing his songs with lovely cord voicings, but never overwhelming you with a flurry of flourishes. One listen and you may find yourself using your sleeve to wipe away the tears."
Freshindependence says If I Was a River will take your breath away and move you to a place that will check your ego at the door and take you back to what matters most in this crazy old world."
Jeffrey Sisk of Pittsburgh in Tune said; "The spellbinding 10-track release features sparse arrangements with Nile accompanying himself on piano, rather than his usual guitar. The results are truly special. I can’t recommend this one highly enough, folks."
Writing in No Depression Harrisonaphotos says "this album ends with two delightful love songs, delivered with gravitas and care way beyond my expectations. "The One You Used to Love" is truly wonderful and his piano playing is very nearly classical. The finale, "Let Me Be the River" brought a tear to my eye the first time I heard it."
Carlo Wolff, in the Cleveland Jewish News, describes "If I Was a River" as the type of music that becomes timeless, is often oracular, regularly poetic, mysterious and personal, and refers to Nile along with Bob Dylan and Leonard Cohen as bards and masters of melody and meaning.
James Mann affirms in the December 2014 "Ink19" that If I Was a River "glistens with a quiet power and grace. Masterful"
In The Alternate Root Danny writes: "The album does out Willie Nile though, showing the man behind the curtain has tenderness in his pen as he scribes ten tales of introspection and self-assessment."
Han van Bree of Soundz Magazine declares "If I Was A River is a timeless album that sounds familiar right from the opening track".
Associated Press: "A top-notch album”

== Track listing ==
No.	Title	Writer(s)	Length
1.	"If I Was a River"	Nile, F. Lee	2:45
2.	"Lost"	Nile	4:03
3.	"Song of a Soldier"	Nile, F. Lee	2:29
4.	"Once in a Lullaby"	Nile, F. Lee	3:31
5.	"Lullaby Loon"	Nile	3:04
6.	"Gloryland"	Nile, F. Lee	2:37
7.	"I Can't Do Crazy (Anymore)"	Nile, Danny Kortchmar	3:41
8.	"Goin' to St. Louis"	Nile	2:35
9.	"The One You Used to Love"	Nile	3:49
10.	"Let Me Be the River"	Nile, F. Lee	3:21
Total length:			33:52

== Personnel ==
Musicians

- Willie Nile – piano, vocals
- Steuart Smith – acoustic and electric guitars, baritone guitar, Elbow, bass, pump organ, Hammond organ, Rhodes, backing vocals
- David Mansfield – mandolin, acoustic guitar, violin, viola
- Frankie Lee – backing vocals

Production and additional personnel

- Executive Producers: Kevin Collins, Gary Lippman, Jeffrey Schneider
- Record producer by Stewart Lerman and Willie Nile
- Engineered by Sean Kelly
- Additional Engineering – David Mansfield
- Mixing by Stewart Lerman
- Recorded at Hobo Sound, Weehawken, NJ
- Mastering by Greg Calbi at Sterling Sound, NYC
- Art direction by Deborah Maniaci
- Photography Cristina Arrigoni
- Publicity – Cary Baker – conqueroo.com
- Booking – Adam Bayer at Fleming Artists
