= American Ride (Willie Nile album) =

Studio album by Willie Nile
- Released: June 25, 2013
- Genre: Rock
- Length: 40:31
- Label: Loud & Proud; Blue Rose
- Producer: Stewart Lerman; Willie Nile; Johnny Pisano; Alex Alexander

Willie Nile chronology
The Innocent Ones (2011)	American Ride (2013)	If I Was a River (2014)

Professional ratings
Aggregate scores
Source	Rating
Metacritic	87/100
Review scores
Source	Rating
AllMusic	4/5 stars
American Songwriter	3.5/5 stars
Blurt	5/5 stars
PopMatters	9/10 stars

American Ride is the eighth studio album from American musician Willie Nile. It was released in June 2013 under Loud & Proud Records.

== Critical reviews ==
Hal Horowitz in American Songwriter said: "Nile delivers one of his finest and most passionate projects with American Ride."

== Track listing ==
No.	Title	Writer(s)	Length
1.	"This Is Our Time"	Nile	2:45
2.	"Life on Bleecker Street"	Nile	3:23
3.	"American Ride"	Nile, Mike Peters	4:51
4.	"If I Ever See the Light"	Nile, Frankie Lee	3:06
5.	"She's Got My Heart"	Nile, Frankie Lee	3:08
6.	"God Laughs"	Nile, Eric Bazilian	3:12
7.	"People Who Died"	Jim Carroll, Brian Linsley, Steve Linsley, Terrell Winn, Wayne Woods	3:50
8.	"Holy War"	Nile	4:01
9.	"Say Hey"	Nile	2:54
10.	"Sunrise in New York City"	Nile, Frankie Lee	2:49
11.	"The Crossing"	Nile, Frankie Lee	3:10
12.	"There's No Place Like Home"	Nile	3:23

iTunes Special Edition
No.	Title	Writer(s)	Length
13.	"Occupy"	Nile	3:22
14.	"The Motel Life"	Nile	4:01
15.	"One Guitar V2.0"	Nile, Frankie Lee	4:13
Total length:			49:22

== Personnel ==
Musicians

- Willie Nile – guitar, vocals, piano
- Johnny Pisano – electric and upright bass, backing vocals
- Matt Hogan – guitars
- Alex Alexander – drums, percussion
- Steuart Smith – guitars, banjo, harmonium
- James Maddock – acoustic guitar, backing vocals
- Leslie Mendelson – backing vocals
- Rob Morsberger – string arrangement on "The Crossing", harmonium
- Oli Rockberger – piano, organ
- Suzanne Ornstein – violin, viola
- Lee Hogans – trumpet
- Matt Janiszewski – saxophone
- Johnny Pisano and Rob Morsberger – string arrangement on "Life On Bleecker Street"

Production and additional personnel

- Executive Producer: Andrew Fitzsimmons
- Produced by Stewart Lerman and Willie Nile
- Additional production: Johnny Pisano and Alex Alexander
- Engineered by James Frazee at Hobo Sound
- Mixing by Stewart Lerman at Hobo Sound, Weehawken, NJ
- Mastering by Greg Calbi at Sterling Sound, NYC
- Art direction by Deborah Maniaci
- Photography Christina Arrigoni

== Charts ==
Chart (2013)	Peak position
US Billboard 200	156
US Americana/Folk Albums (Billboard)	7
US Heatseekers Albums (Billboard)	1
US Independent Albums (Billboard)	40
US Top Rock Albums (Billboard)	48
