= Abandoned Love =

Song by Bob Dylan

from the album Biograph
- Released: November 7, 1985
- Recorded: July 31, 1975
- Genre: Folk rock
- Length: 4:29
- Label: Columbia
- Songwriter: Bob Dylan

Dylan in 1975

Riviera in 1976

"Abandoned Love" is a song written by Bob Dylan, recorded on July 31, 1975, but not released until 1985, on his compilation album Biograph. It was originally recorded for inclusion on his 1976 album Desire, but was dropped in favor of "Joey". "Abandoned Love" was written during Dylan's breakup with his then-wife Sara Lownds. A working title for the song was "Sara Part II Abandoned Love." It was also known at one point as "Saint John the Evangelist", after a line in the song lyrics.

Only one live performance of this song is known of, at The Bitter End cafe on Bleecker Street in Greenwich Village on July 3, 1975, during a show with Ramblin' Jack Elliott. Paul Cable, in his book Bob Dylan: His Unreleased Recordings (New York: Schirmer Books, 1980), described this live version of the song as "Beautiful, eerie, easily as good as Blonde on Blonde lyrics and a tune that is unusual and perfect".

== Reception ==
Rolling Stone listed "Abandoned Love" as #64 on its list of Dylan's 100 greatest songs, calling the Biograph version "one of Dylan's most tortured, heartbroken recordings". Billboard included the song in its list of Dylan's 15 "most poetic lyrics". The Big Issue placed it at #37 on a 2021 list of the "80 best Bob Dylan songs - that aren't the greatest hits" and called it a "jolly break-up song for a change". A 2021 Guardian article included it on a list of "80 Bob Dylan songs everyone should know".

== Personnel ==
- Bob Dylan – vocals, rhythm guitar, harmonica
- Scarlet Rivera – violin
- Rob Stoner – bass guitar, backing vocals
- Howard Wyeth – drums, piano

=== Covers ===
"Abandoned Love" has been covered numerous times, notably by:

- George Harrison recorded an unreleased demo version in the 1980s.
- The Everly Brothers: Born Yesterday (1985)
- Seán Keane: All Heart No Roses (1993)
- Chuck Prophet: Outlaw Blues, Volume 2 (1995)
- Paul Rodgers and Nils Lofgren: Chimes of Freedom: The Songs of Bob Dylan Honoring 50 Years of Amnesty International (2012)
- Willie Nile on his Dylan tribute album Positively Bob: Willie Nile Sings Bob Dylan (2017)
- Gillian Welch and David Rawlings on their album All the Good Times Are Past & Gone (2020)
