= Tom Wolk =

American musician (1951–2010)

Tom "T-Bone" Wolk

Background information
- Born: December 24, 1951; Yonkers, New York, U.S.
- Died: February 28, 2010 (aged 58) New York City, U.S.
- Genres: Pop; rock; blues
- Occupations: Musician; producer
- Instruments: Bass; guitar; mandolin; keyboards; accordion
- Years active: 1970s–2010
- Formerly of: Hall & Oates; Billy Joel Band; The Saturday Night Live Band
- Website: tbonewolk.com

Tom "T-Bone" Wolk (December 24, 1951 – February 28, 2010) was an American musician and bassist for the music duo Daryl Hall & John Oates and a member of the Saturday Night Live house band.

== Early life ==
Wolk was born and raised in Yonkers, New York. He was a state accordion champion by age 12. Seeing the Beatles on The Ed Sullivan Show led him to bass and guitar—the former influenced by James Jamerson and Paul McCartney. He attended Roosevelt High School. Although he studied art at Cooper Union, most of his youth was spent playing in bar bands, where he first met guitarist G. E. Smith (who gave him the nickname T-Bone—for blues guitarist T-Bone Walker—after Wolk played his bass behind his head during a solo).

== Career ==
By the time he auditioned for and joined Hall & Oates in 1981, Wolk had cracked the studio and jingle scene on the recommendation of Will Lee, and had played on rap’s first gold record, Kurtis Blow’s "The Breaks." He played on Hall & Oates hits including "Maneater," "Out of Touch," "One on One," and "Family Man." He also anchored the Saturday Night Live house band from 1986–1992 with his Hall & Oates bandmate Smith.

Wolk was a multi-instrumentalist and worked with Daryl Hall, Carly Simon, Jellyfish, Squeeze, Elvis Costello, Jaye Muller (Count Jaye), Shawn Colvin and Billy Joel over the course of his career. Downtime from Hall & Oates led to tours with Carly Simon and Billy Joel, and many studio sessions, highlighted by four albums with Costello and one with Costello and Burt Bacharach.

In 1991, Wolk co-produced Willie Nile's Places I Have Never Been on Columbia Records. Wolk also worked with Ryan Leslie on his self-titled debut album. Wolk recorded on bluesman Guy Davis' albums, Butt Naked Free and Chocolate to the Bone, and appeared with Guy on Late Night with Conan O'Brien performing, "Waitin' On the Cards to Fall". Wolk had a column in the publication Guitar for the Practicing Musician during the 1980s. He also appeared on the latest albums from Simon (his fifth with her) and ex-New York Yankees outfielder and guitarist Bernie Williams.

== Death ==
Wolk was a longtime resident of Brattleboro, Vermont. He died of a heart attack in New York City on February 28, 2010, at age 58.
