= The Innocent Ones =

The Innocent Ones may refer to:

- The Innocent Ones (Blue Tears album)
- The Innocent Ones (Willie Nile album)
