= House of a Thousand Guitars =

Studio album by Willie Nile
- Released: April 14, 2009
- Recorded: New York City
- Genre: Rock
- Length: 52:40
- Label: River House/GB
- Producers: Willie Nile, Andy York, Brad Albetta, Rich Pagano, Stewart Lerman, Frankie Lee, Hirsh Gardner

Willie Nile chronology
Streets of New York (2006)	House of a Thousand Guitars (2009)	The Innocent Ones (2010)

Professional ratings
Review scores
Source	Rating
Popmatters	7/10 stars

House of a Thousand Guitars (2009) is the sixth studio album by singer-songwriter Willie Nile, comprising a mixture of piano ballads and classic guitar rock. The album is dedicated to the memory of Nile's brother John.

== Track listing ==
1. "House of a Thousand Guitars" – 4:04 (Nile)
2. "Run" – 4:25 (Nile)
3. "Doomsday Dance" – 4:15 (Nile, Lee)
4. "Love is a Train" – 5:29 (Nile)
5. "Her Love Falls Like Rain" – 3:04 (Nile, Lee)
6. "Now That The War Is Over" – 4:35 (Nile)
7. "Give Me Tomorrow" – 4:47 (Nile, Lee)
8. "Magdalena" – 3:48 (Nile, Lee)
9. "Little Light" – 5:00 (Nile, Lee)
10. "Touch Me" – 4:48 (Nile, Lee)
11. "The Midnight Rose" – 4:20 (Nile, Lee)
12. "When The Last Light Goes Out on Broadway" – 4:05 (Nile, Lee)

== Personnel ==
- Willie Nile – guitar, vocals, piano, pump organ
- Andy York – guitar, background vocals
- Steuart Smith – guitar, bass, piano, pump organ, keyboard
- Brad Albetta – bass
- Rich Pagano – drums, percussion, background vocals
- Frankie Lee – drums, percussion, background vocals
- Brian Mitchell – piano, organ
- Stewart Lerman – bass, guitar
- Rob Morsberger – strings
- Christopher Hoffman – cello
- Charlie Elgart – organ
- Hirsh Gardner – background vocals
- Tracie Gardner – background vocals
- Michela Gardner – background vocals

Technical personnel

- Producers – Willie Nile, Andy York, Brad Albetta, Rich Pagano, Stewart Lerman, Frankie Lee, Hirsh Gardner
- Engineering – Rich Pagano, Rich Lamb, Stewart Lerman
- Mixing – Hirsh Gardner, Stewart Lerman
- Mastering – Fred Kevorkian
- Art Direction – Victoria Collier
- Photography – Lorraine Simon
- Creative Director for Willie Nile Music – Deborah Maniaci
- Legal – Bob Donnelly (Lommen Abdo)
- Publicity – Cary Baker – Conqueroo, Los Angeles, CA
- Management – Gary Borress
