= Streets of New York (album) =

Studio album by Willie Nile
- Released: 2006
- Recorded: New York City
- Genre: Rock
- Length: 64:35
- Label: Reincarnate Music
- Producer: Willie Nile, Rich Pagano, Andy York, Brad Albetta

Willie Nile chronology
Beautiful Wreck of the World (1999)	Streets of New York (2006)	House of a Thousand Guitars (2009)

Streets of New York (2006) is the fifth studio album by New York City based singer/songwriter Willie Nile. This is Nile's tribute to the city that gave him international exposure to the music world through the critical eyes and ears of The New York Times.

== Background ==
The album is a tour book of city images; The tourists, the subway, the West Side, Rivington Street, a circus at Washington Square where one meets Bo Diddley, a Broadway night out with Annie, where we encounter a saddened aging actress whose best years are far behind her. A protest and a chilling reminder of the modern dangers we all face in today's world. The album is a portrait of the maze of iron, stone, and people that makes New York so unique, while mocking its opulence; still Nile always finds his way back home to the "Streets of New York".

== Critical reception ==
Professional ratings
Review scores
Source	Rating
AllMusic	4.5/5 stars
The A.V. Club	B+
Popmatters	7/10 stars
Uncut	8/10 stars

- Luke Torn of Uncut magazine wrote: "Streets of New York is the New-Normal, post-9/11 album no-one else dared write - epic and prophetic."
- Chosen "Classic American Album" by David Jarman of Americana-UK. Jarman writes; "One of those albums which keeps calling you back – a true classic".

== Track listing ==
1. "Welcome to My Head" – 3:22 (W. Nile)
2. "Asking Annie Out" – 3:11 (W. Nile, F. Lee)
3. "Game of Fools" – 4:10 (W. Nile, F. Lee)
4. "Back Home" – 6:24 (W. Nile)
5. "The Day I Saw Bo Diddley in Washington Square" – 4:46 (W. Nile, F. Lee)
6. "Best Friends Money Can Buy" – 3:17 (W. Nile)
7. "Faded Flower of Broadway" – 5:12 (W. Nile, F. Lee)
8. "When One Stands" – 4:46 (W. Nile, F. Lee)
9. "Whole World with You" – 4:10 (W. Nile)
10. "On Some Rainy Day" – 5:10 (W. Nile, F. Lee)
11. "Cell Phones Ringing (In the Pockets of the Dead" – 5:13 (W. Nile)
12. "Lonesome Dark-Eyed Beauty" – 5:47 (W. Nile)
13. "Police on My Back" – 3:33 (E. Grant)
14. "Streets of New York" – 5:20 (W. Nile)

== Personnel ==
- Willie Nile – guitar, vocals, piano, organ, rhodes
- Andy York – Guitar, Piano, Organ, Mellotron, Tambourine, Backing vocals
- Brad Albetta – Electric & Acoustic Bass
- Rich Pagano – Drums, Percussion, Backing vocals
- Frankie Lee – Drums, Percussion, Congas, Backing vocals

Guest musicians

- Bruce Brody – Hammond B3
- Andy Burton – String box, Organ, Piano
- Larry Campbell – Mandolin, Fiddle, Citttern
- Jakob Dylan – Backing vocals
- Rob Hyman – Hammond B3, Toy piano, Keyboards
- Rami Jaffee – Hammond B3
- Stewart Lerman – Electric Guitar
- Brian Mitchell – Wurlitzer
- Eddy Nystrom – Acoustic Guitar
- Fred Parcels – Tin Whistle, Trombone
- Jeff Tuel – Backing Vocals

Production

- Executive Producer: George Hecksher
- Producers: Willie Nile, Rich Pagano, Andy York, Brad Albetta, Frankie Lee
- Engineering: Brian Fulk, Brad Albetta, Rich Lamb, Rich Pagano, Stewart Lerman, Michael Golub
- Remixing: Rich Pagano, Jamey Staub, Stewart Lerman
- Mastering: Fred Kevorkian
- Cover photo: Jeff Fasano
- Photography: Godis, Jeff Fasano, Luke Noonan, Bourdeau Brothers, Judy Finelly
- Art Direction: Victoria Collier, Deborah Maniaci
