= New York at Night =

New York at Night may refer to:

- New York at Night, a 2020 album by Willie Nile
- New York at Night, TV series with Clint Holmes
- "New York at Night", song by Old Dominion from Happy Endings
- "New York at Night", song by Aaron Hedenstrom by the One O'Clock Lab Band
- "New York at Night", song by Kelly Marie from Feels Like I'm in Love
