= Beautiful Wreck of the World =

Studio album by Willie Nile
- Released: 1999
- Genre: Rock
- Length: 57:04
- Label: River House Records
- Producer: Willie Nile; Brad Albetta; Frankie Lee; Richard Pagano; Andy York

Willie Nile chronology
Hard Times in America (1992)	Beautiful Wreck of the World (1999)	Streets of New York (2006)

Professional ratings
Review scores
Source	Rating
Allmusic	3.5/5 stars
Uncut	9/10 stars

Beautiful Wreck of the World is the fourth studio album from American musician Willie Nile. It was released in 1999 by Nile's label River House Records.
Uncut: "the majestic "On The Road to Calvary (For Jeff Buckley)" is soul music of the deepest order".

== Track listing ==
No.	Title	Writer(s)	Length
1.	"You Gotta Be A Buddha (In A Place Like This)"	Nile, Marc Blatte	4:13
2.	"Black Magic And White Lies"	Nile, Frankie Lee	4:01
3.	"Bread Alone"	Nile, Tony Clarkin, Rick Chertoff	5:51
4.	"Every Time The World Turns Around"	Nile, Frankie Lee	3:18
5.	"History 101"	Nile	3:51
6.	"The Man Who Used To Be"	Nile, Frankie Lee	3:13
7.	"Beautiful Wreck of the World"	Nile, Frankie Lee	4:58
8.	"Brain Damage"	Nile	4:29
9.	"The Black Parade"	Nile, Frankie Lee	4:42
10.	"Oatmeal Box"	Nile, Frankie Lee	4:00
11.	"Somewhere It's Raining"	Nile, Frankie Lee	3:20
12.	"On The Road To Calvary (for Jeff Buckley)"	Nile	5:55
13.	"Tiorunda Surprise"	Nile	5:13
Total length:			57:04

== Personnel ==
Musicians

- Willie Nile – guitar, vocals, piano, keyboard
- Andy York – lead guitar, backing vocals
- Brad Albetta – bass guitar
- Rich Pagano – drums, percussion, backing vocals
- Frankie Lee – guitar, drums, backing vocals on "Beautiful Wreck" and "Oatmeal", tambourine on "Somewhere It's Raining"
- Mickey Raphael – echo harp on "Calvary"
- Chris Byrne – uilleann pipes on "Beautiful Wreck", tin whistle on "Oatmeal"
- Stewart Lerman – organ on "Oatmeal", guitar & organ on "Beautiful Wreck"
- Bruce Tunkel – backing vocals on "Oatmeal"

Production and additional personnel

- Executive Producer: George Hecksher
- Produced by Willie Nile, Frankie Lee, Brad Albetta, Andy York, Rich Pagano
- Engineered by Brad Albetta, Rich Lamb, Rich Pagano, Bruce Tunkel
- Mixing by Stewart Lerman at The Shinebox, Rich Pagano at New Calcutta Recordings
- Mastering by Vince Carp at BMG Studios, NYC
- Art direction by George Philhower
- Photography Godlis, Margaret Bevan
