= Hard Times in America =

EP by Willie Nile
- Released: 1992
- Recorded: New Breed Studios, NYC
- Genre: Rock
- Length: 20:02
- Label: Polaris Records
- Producer: Willie Nile; Stewart Lerman; Martin Briley

Willie Nile chronology
Places I Have Never Been (1991)	Hard Times in America (1992)	Beautiful Wreck of the World (1999)

Professional ratings
Review scores
Source	Rating
AllMusic	2/5 stars

Hard Times in America is an extended play musical recording by American singer-songwriter Willie Nile. The EP was released in 1992 by Polaris Records, Inc.

== Track listing ==
No.	Title	Writer(s)	Length
1.	"Hard Times in America"	Nile	4:43
2.	"Seeds of a Revolution"	Nile	4:01
3.	"Someday"	Nile, Martin Briley	3:47
4.	"Sorry"	Nile	3:12
5.	"Heart Of Wonder"	Nile	4:12

No.	Title	Length
Total length:		20:02

== Personnel ==
Musicians

- Willie Nile – acoustic guitar, vocals, piano, keyboards
- Richard Kennedy – electric & acoustic guitars background vocals
- Frank Vilardi – drums
- Brian Stanley – bass guitar
- David Kumin – keyboards
- Paul Ossola – bass guitar on "Seeds Of A Revolution"
- Martin Briley – guitar & keyboards on "Someday", background vocals
- Steve Holley – drums & percussion on "Someday"
- Mark Johnson – background vocals
- Frankie Lee – background vocals

Production and additional personnel

- Record producer by Stewart Lerman, Willie Nile, Martin Briley
- Engineered by Dominic Maita, Steve Addabbo
- Mixing by Stewart Lerman, Dominic Maita, Steve Addabbo
- Mastering by Ricky Essig at Frankford-Wayne Mastering Labs, NYC
- Art direction by Dennis Loren
- Photography Patti Mitchell, Kristian Lawing
