= Places I Have Never Been =

Studio album by Willie Nile
- Released: 1991
- Studios: 321, The Hit Factory, Messina Music (New York City), Home Base, Studio 4 (Philadelphia)
- Genres: Rock, folk rock
- Length: 52:12
- Label: Columbia
- Producers: Tom "T-Bone" Wolk, Stewart Lerman

Willie Nile chronology
| Golden Down (1981) | Places I Have Never Been (1991) | Hard Times in America (1992) |

Places I Have Never Been is an album by the American musician Willie Nile, released in 1991. It was Nile's first album in 10 years, as legal and personal issues prevented him from putting out music. Nile supported the album with a North American tour.

== Production ==
The album was produced by Tom "T-Bone" Wolk and Stewart Lerman; Nile chose them after Rick Chertoff became unavailable. It was Nile's intention to write an optimistic record.

Richard Thompson and Roger McGuinn were among the guitar players who contributed to the album. Suzzy Roche, Terre Roche, and Loudon Wainwright III sang on "That's Enough for Me". Members of the Hooters also contributed to Places I Have Never Been.

== Critical reception ==
Professional ratings
Review scores
| Source | Rating |
|---|---|
| AllMusic | 4/5 stars |
| Chicago Tribune | 3.5/4 stars |
| Windsor Star | A |

The Austin American-Statesman wrote that "the nasal vocals, chiming guitars and anthemic scope of the material offer a hint of Tom Petty, a little Bruce Springsteen and a whole lot of Byrds." The Atlanta Journal-Constitution opined that "Nile's lyrics, as they were on his first two records, are still his strong suit."

The Washington Post deemed the album "a half-dozen sharp but not overly slick grabbers" and "a modest pleasure—even if it too is the sort of album that includes a reprise of its opening song." The Vancouver Sun called it "pretty nifty ... adult rock and roll." The Toronto Sun considered it to be "a jangly and surprisingly upbeat collection of folk-rock."

== Track listing ==
| No. | Title | Writer(s) | Length |
|---|---|---|---|
| 1. | "Places I Have Never Been" | Willie Nile, J. R. Cobb, Rick Chertoff | 5:02 |
| 2. | "Rite of Spring" | Nile | 4:23 |
| 3. | "Heaven Help the Lonely" | Nile, Dean Chamberlain | 5:18 |
| 4. | "Café Memphis" | Nile | 4:15 |
| 5. | "Yesterday's Dreams" | Nile | 4:46 |
| 6. | "Everybody Needs a Hammer" | Nile | 4:36 |
| 7. | "Renegades" | Nile | 5:33 |
| 8. | "Don't Die" | Nile | 3:12 |
| 9. | "Breakdown" | Nile, Lowry Hamner | 5:12 |
| 10. | "Children of Paradise" | Nile, Martin Briley | 4:56 |
| 11. | "That's Enough for Me" | Nile | 4:11 |
| 12. | "Places I Have Never Been (Reprise)" | Nile, Cobb, Chertoff | 0:48 |
| Total length: | | | 52:12 |

== Personnel ==
Musicians

- Willie Nile – lead & background vocals, electric, 12 string, & acoustic guitars, keyboard and piano
- Stewart Lerman – electric & acoustic guitars, 6 & 12 string guitars, maracas
- T-Bone Wolk – bass, acoustic guitar, keyboard, piano, percussion
- Mickey Curry – drums, tambourine, percussion, background vocals
- Peter Wood – keyboard, piano
- Larry Campbell – fiddle
- Roger McGuinn – guitar, 12 string guitar, background vocals
- Mark Johnson – background vocals
- James Cobb – background vocals
- Robbie McIntosh – electric guitar
- William Wittmann – acoustic guitar, background vocals, keyboard
- Paul "Wix" Wickens – Hammond organ
- Richard Thompson – lead electric guitar, background vocals
- Eric Bazilian – mandolin, background vocals
- Rob Hyman – accordion
- Richard Kennedy – lead acoustic guitar
- Luke Noonan – piano, background vocals
- Terre Roche – background vocals
- Suzzy Roche – background vocals
- Loudon Wainwright III – background vocals
- Bobby Noonan – background vocals
- Mary Noonan – background vocals
- JoJo Noonan – background vocals
- Jennifer Krause – background vocals
- Anthony Acquilato – background vocals
- Kelly Moore – background vocals
- Mel Papaterpos – background vocals

Production and additional personnel

- Produced by Tom "T-Bone" Wolk and Stewart Lerman
- Executive producer: Rick Chertoff
- Mixing and additional recording Produced by William Wittmann
- Recorded and mixed by John Agnello
- Recorded at 321 Studios, The Hit Factory, Messina Music (New York City), Home Base Studios, Studio 4 (Philadelphia)
- Mixed at Messina Music
- Additional engineering: Tim Leitner, Ted Trewhella
- Assistant engineers: Ted Trewhella, Tom Cadley, Lance Neal, Joe Bartoldus, Phil Nicolo
- Mastered by George Marino at Sterling Sound (New York City)
- Art direction by Tony Sellari
- Cover photography by Lou Salvatori
