= The Innocent Ones (Willie Nile album) =

Studio album by Willie Nile
- Released: 2010
- Genre: Rock
- Length: 39:05
- Label: River House Records; Blue Rose
- Producer: Stewart Lerman; Willie Nile; Hirsh Gardner; Frankie Lee; Steuart Smith

Willie Nile chronology
House of a Thousand Guitars (2009)	The Innocent Ones (2010)	American Ride (2013)

Professional ratings
Review scores
Source	Rating
Popmatters	8/10 stars
Lincoln Journal Star	A
Debaser	3/5 stars

The Innocent Ones is the seventh studio album from American musician Willie Nile. It was released in 2010 under Nile's River House Records and introduced "One Guitar", winner of the 2013 AIM Independent Music Awards for Best Social Action Song.

== Critical reviews ==
L. Kent Wolgamontt of the Lincoln Journal Star named The Innocent Ones "one of the best rock n' roll records of 2011."

== Track listing ==
No.	Title	Writer(s)	Length
1.	"Singin' Bell"	Nile, Frankie Lee	3:08
2.	"One Guitar"	Nile, Frankie Lee	4:16
3.	"The Innocent Ones"	Nile, Frankie Lee	3:31
4.	"Hear You Breathe"	Nile, Frankie Lee	4:05
5.	"Song For You"	Nile, Frankie Lee	3:58
6.	"My Little Girl"	Nile, Frankie Lee	2:35
7.	"Topless Amateur"	Nile, Frankie Lee	4:17
8.	"Rich And Broken"	Nile, Frankie Lee	3:13
9.	"Can't Stay Home"	Nile, Frankie Lee	2:40
10.	"Sideways Beautiful"	Nile	4:33
11.	"Far Green Hills"	Nile, Frankie Lee	2:54
Total length:			39:05

== Personnel ==
Musicians

- Willie Nile – guitar, vocals, piano, organ, keyboards, harmonica
- Steuart Smith – guitars, bass, pump organ, banjo, piano on "Sideways Beautiful"
- Frankie Lee – drums, percussion, background vocals

Production and additional personnel

- Produced – Stewart Lerman, Willie Nile, Frankie Lee, and Hirsch Gardner
- Engineered – Stewart Lerman, Hirsch Gardner, Willie NIle, Frankie Lee
- Marketing – Bob Chiappardi
- Mixing – Hirsch Gardner
- Mastering – Fred Kevorkian
- Art direction – Deborah Maniaci
- Photography – Thomas Weller (Front & Back Cover), Christina Arrigoni
