= Golden Down =

Studio album by Willie Nile
- Released: 1981
- Recorded: November–December 1980
- Studio: Record Plant, New York City
- Genre: Rock
- Length: 39:45
- Label: Arista 1981, Razor & Tie 1992
- Producer: Thom Panunzio; Willie Nile

Willie Nile chronology
Willie Nile (1980)	Golden Down (1981)	Places I Have Never Been (1991)

Professional ratings
Review scores
Source	Rating
AllMusic	3/5 stars

Golden Down is the second studio album by the American rock artist Willie Nile. It was released in 1981 on vinyl by Arista Records and re-released in 1992 on CD by Razor & Tie.

== Track listing ==
No.	Title	Writer(s)	Length
1.	"Poor Boy"	Nile	4:32
2.	"Shine Your Light"	Nile	3:52
3.	"Grenade"	Nile	3:25
4.	"I Can't Get You Off of my Mind"	Nile	3:41
5.	"I Like The Way"	Nile	4:07
6.	"Golden Down"	Nile	5:08
7.	"Hide Your Love"	Nile	3:04
8.	"Les Champs Élysées"	Nile, Amanda Owen	2:57
9.	"Shoulders"	Nile	4:54

1992 Razor & Tie CD edition added track
No.	Title	Writer(s)	Length
10.	"It's Your Love"	Nile	4:05
Total length:			39:45

== Personnel ==
Musicians

- Willie Nile – vocals, guitar and piano
- Clay Barnes – guitars
- Peter Hoffman – guitars
- Fred Smith – bass guitar
- Jay Dee Daugherty – Sonor drums and percussion
- Paul Shaffer – keyboards on "Les Champs Élysées", "Shine Your Light", "Golden Down", "Hide Your Love", "I Like The Way" and "Poor Boy"
- Greg Husted – Hammond organ on "Shoulders", and "Poor Boy”
- Paul Prestopino – dulcimer and dobro on "I Like The Way”
- Arno Hecht – saxophone on "Les Champs Élysées”
- Terre Roche – backing vocals
- Mark Johnson – backing vocals
- Lowry Hamner – backing vocals

Production and additional personnel

- Produced by Thom Panunzio and Willie Nile
- Additional production: Jimmy Iovine – "Poor Boy”
- Engineered by Thom Panunzio
- Additional engineering by Jim Ball – "It’s Your Love”
- Assistant sngineer: Jim Ball, Jason Corasro
- Mastering by Greg Calbi at Sterling Sound, NYC
- Art direction by Maude Gilman
- Reissue art direction by Kristian Lawing
- Cover Photography Christine Rodin
- Additional photography: Irene Young, Marcelino Pagan, Kristian Lawing

== Charts ==
Chart (1981)	Peak position
US Billboard 200	158
