= Socialismo tascabile (Prove tecniche di trasmissione) =

Studio album by Offlaga Disco Pax
- Released: 7 March 2005
- Genre: Indie, electronica
- Length: 68:08
- Label: Santeria
- Producer: Giacomo Fiorenza

Offlaga Disco Pax chronology
Socialismo tascabile (Prove tecniche di trasmissione) (2005)	Bachelite (2008)

Socialismo tascabile (Prove tecniche di trasmissione) is the debut album by Italian indie/electronica band Offlaga Disco Pax. It was released in 2005 and received mostly positive reviews.

== Track listing ==
songs written by Collini and Fontanelli, except where indicated.

- "Kappler" (Collini, Carretti) (5:25)
- "Enver" (4:54)
- "Khmer Rossa" (5:36)
- "Cinnamon" (4:28)
- "Tono Metallico Standard" (Collini, Carretti) (5:04)
- "Tatranky" (8:16)
- "Robespierre" (3:35)
- "Piccola Pietroburgo" (5:58)
- "De Fonseca" (Collini, Carretti) (11:37)

== Thematic elements ==
The title can be translated as Pocket socialism (broadcast test techniques).

Collini's lyrics are filled with references to people and places from the past, mostly from the Italian years of lead. Among the political figures mentioned on the album are Enver Hoxha, Georgi Dimitrov, Rosa Luxemburg, Malcolm X, Antonio Gramsci, Alexander Dubček, Maximilien Robespierre, Enrico Berlinguer, Marco Pannella, Ronald Reagan, Karl Marx, Ho Chi Minh, Che Guevara, Dolores Ibárruri, Josip Broz Tito, Kim Il Sung and Vladimir Lenin. A range of confectionery products, including Cinnamon-flavoured bubblegum and Tatranky wafers, is also mentioned, carrying several political metaphors: the commercial disappearance of these products is compared to the decadence of communism. Collini cites several musicians, including Mark Lanegan and his band Screaming Trees, the punk band Dead Kennedys, the hard rock band Van Halen and several new wave and synthpop acts such as Depeche Mode, Modern Talking and Nik Kershaw. Actual life happenings are also translated into lyrics in several songs.

1. "Kappler"
  - Herbert Kappler
  - Matura
2. "Enver"
  - Enver Hoxha
3. "Khmer Rossa"
  - Georgi Dimitrov
  - Vladimir Mayakovsky
  - Filippo Turati
  - Pietro Nenni
  - Khmer Rouge, the ruling political party of Cambodia from 1975 to 1979.
  - The October Revolution
  - Rosa Luxemburg
  - Stalingrad
4. "Cinnamon"
  - Cinnamon-flavoured bubblegum
  - Koper, Slovenia (Italian: Capodistria)
  - The Black Panther Party
  - Malcolm X
  - Stimorol chewing gum
  - Antonio Gramsci
  - Big Babol chewing gum (manufactured by Perfetti Van Melle)
5. "Tono Metallico Standard"
  - Standa, an Italian chain of department stores.
  - Mark Lanegan
  - Screaming Trees
  - Dead Kennedys
6. "Tatranky"
  - Prague
  - Leonid Brezhnev
  - Marxism
  - Modern Talking
  - Samantha Fox
  - Nik Kershaw
  - Al Bano and Romina Power
  - Depeche Mode
  - Alexander Dubček
  - Škoda Auto
  - Tatranky wafers, once produced in the Czech Republic but now manufactured by the Groupe Danone
  - Loacker wafers
7. "Robespierre"
  - Maximilien Robespierre
  - Jacobins
  - Space Invaders
  - Enrico Berlinguer
  - Alberto Juantorena
  - Sandinismo in Nicaragua
  - Marco Pannella
  - Marlboro cigarettes
  - The NSU Prinz
  - Anna Oxa
  - The Festival della canzone italiana
  - Van Halen
  - Jarmila Kratochvílová
  - Toblerone chocolate
  - American bombing of Tripoli and Benghazi, Libya, which occurred on 15 April 1986.
  - Ronald Reagan
  - Karl Marx
  - Ho Chi Minh
  - Che Guevara
  - Dolores Ibárruri
  - Stalingrad
  - Josip Broz Tito
  - Vladimir Lenin
  - The village of Cavriago
  - The Italian Communist Party
  - The Democrazia Cristiana party
8. "Piccola Pietroburgo"
  - Italian singer Orietta Berti
  - Vladimir Lenin
  - The village of Cavriago
  - Reggio Emilia
  - Kim Il Sung
  - Enver Hoxha
  - The Festa de l'Unità
  - Jukka Reverberi of the band Giardini di Mirò
  - Civitavecchia
  - Komsomolskaya Pravda
  - Arkhangelsk
9. "De Fonseca"
  - De Fonseca, an Italian brand of slippers

== Line-up ==
- Enrico Fontanelli – bass, keyboards
- Daniele Carretti – guitar, bass
- Max Collini – vocals

=== Other musicians ===
- Francesco "Burro" Donadello – drums in Enver and Cinnamon
- Daniela "Comaneci" Roman – vocals in Khmer Rossa
