= Offlaga Disco Pax =

Italian indietronica band (2003–2014)

OfflagaDiscoPax
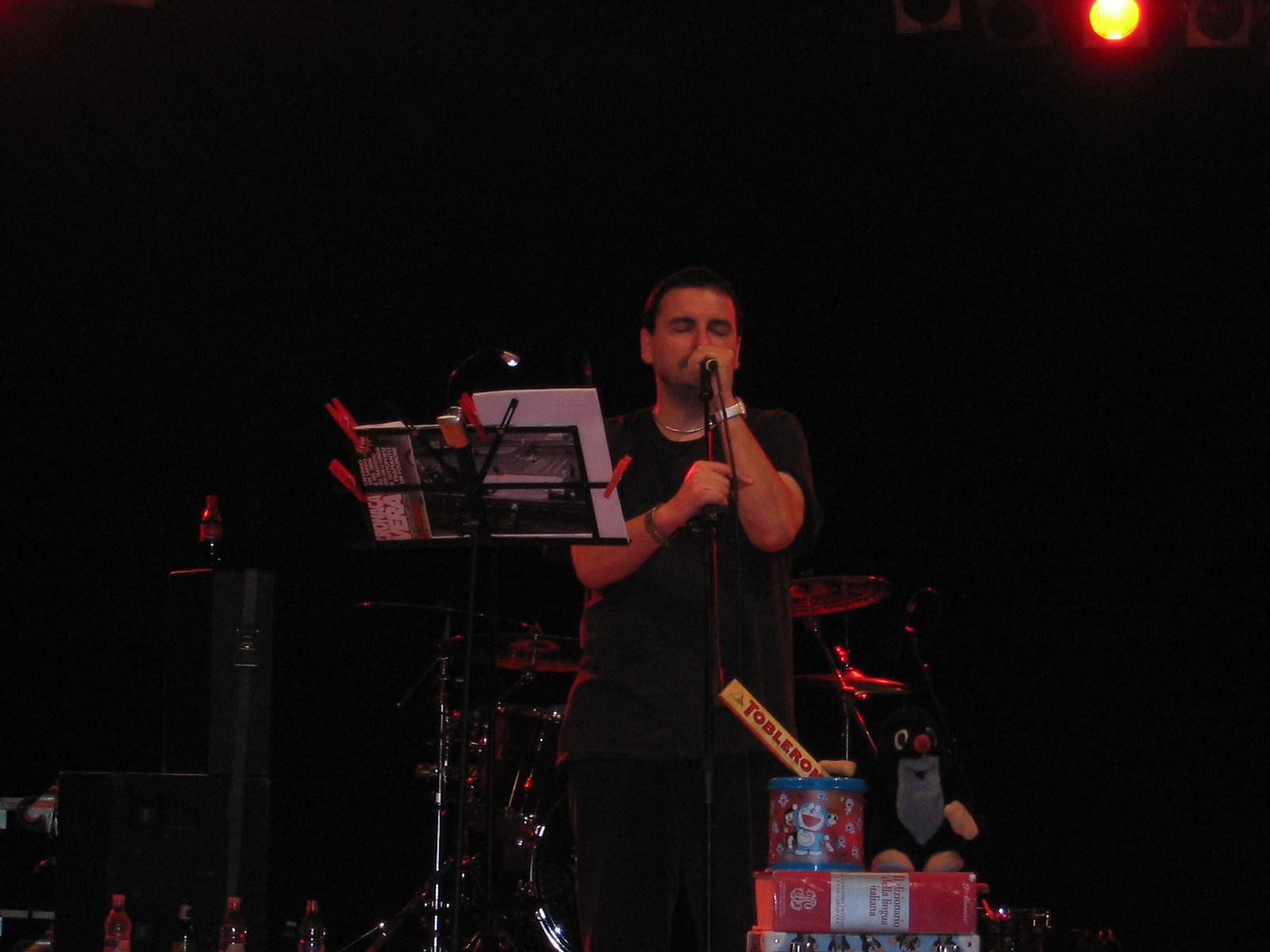
- Singer Max Collini live in Cremona, Italy (2008)

Background information
- Origin: Reggio Emilia, (Italy)
- Genres: Indietronica, new wave, synthpop
- Years active: 2003-2014
- Label: Santeria
- Members: Enrico Fontanelli - bass guitar, keyboards Daniele Carretti - guitar, bass guitar Max Collini - lyrics, vocals

Offlaga Disco Pax was an Italian Indietronica band.

== Background and discography ==
The band was formed in Reggio Emilia in 2003 by Daniele Carretti (guitar, bass guitar), Max Collini (lyrics, vocals) and Enrico Fontanelli (bass guitar, keyboards). They have defined themselves as a collettivo neosensibilista contrario alla democrazia nei sentimenti, roughly "neosensitivist collective against democracy in feelings".

ODP's songs are not sung, but rather recounted by Collini, resembling a spoken word performance. Lyrics, defined by the band as ideologia a bassa intensità (low intensity ideology) are often related to the Italian years of lead, with recurrent references to the Italian Communist Party and Eurocommunist prominent figures at the time. Their lyrics typically deliver a nostalgic portrait in first person of a past political scenario, the one of Cold War and communism in Italy, which does not exist as such anymore.

Musically, their records have elements of electroclash, typically by means of retro analogue synthesizers. They have been paired to bands formed in the late 1970s and the 1980s such as Kraftwerk, Joy Division or Cocteau Twins. Their most significant resemblance in attitude is to now defunct Italian band CCCP Fedeli alla linea.

Their debut album Socialismo tascabile (Prove tecniche di trasmissione) was released in 2005. Its follow-up, Bachelite, was released on February 8, 2008, and Gioco di Società in 2012.

Enrico Fontanelli died April 4, 2014. Following his death, the other two members of the band embarked on different projects, citing that Offlaga Disco Pax was a shared project between three people and without Fontanelli they did not see any future for it.

In 2025, Collini and Carretti announced a reunion and a tour to celebrate the 20th anniversary of their first LP, with Mattia Ferrarini replacing Enrico Fontanelli on stage.
