= Bachelite (album) =

Studio album by Offlaga Disco Pax
- Released: 8 February 2008
- Recorded: May–October 2007
- Genre: Indie; Electronica
- Length: 51:43
- Label: Santeria
- Producer: Francesco Donadello; Enrico Fontanelli; Offlaga Disco Pax

Offlaga Disco Pax chronology
Socialismo tascabile (Prove tecniche di trasmissione) (2005)	Bachelite (2008)	Gioco di società (2012)

Bachelite is the second album released by the Italian indie/electronica band Offlaga Disco Pax. Recorded between May and October 2007 and mastered in October in New York City, the album was published by Santeria Records on February 8, 2008. With this album the band developed its sound, which became much more electronica-influenced than in Socialismo tascabile (Prove tecniche di trasmissione).

== Track listing ==
songs written by Collini and Fontanelli, except where indicated.

- "Superchiome" – 4:22
- "Ventrale" – 3:18
- "Dove ho messo la Golf?" – 6:18
- "Sensibile" (Fontanelli, Carretti, Collini) – 5:49
- "Lungimiranza" (4:00
- "Cioccolato I.A.C.P." (Collini, Carretti) – 9:19
- "Fermo!" (Collini, Carretti) – 5:43)
- "Onomastica" (Collini, Carretti) – 5:55
- "Venti minuti" – 7:03

== Thematic elements ==
Bachelite's themes are similar to the ones in Offlaga Disco Pax's debut album, Socialismo tascabile (Prove tecniche di trasmissione). Collini writes once again about people, athletes and daily happenings linking them to politics, even though Bachelite is more introverted and cryptic than its predecessor.

1. "Superchiome"
  - Punk music
  - Korn
  - The village of Albinea
  - Dave Grohl
2. "Ventrale"
  - Vladimir Yashchenko
  - The 1978 European Championships in Athletics
  - Jacek Wszoła
  - Lech Wałęsa
  - Dietmar Mögenburg
  - Javier Sotomayor
  - La Gazzetta dello Sport, an Italian newspaper.
  - Doctor Who
3. "Dove ho messo la Golf?"
  - Volkswagen Golf
  - Litfiba, an Italian rock band
  - Luiz Inácio Lula da Silva
4. "Sensibile"
  - Francesca Mambro and Valerio Fioravanti, culprits for the 1980 Bologna massacre
  - Fiat Uno, referring the case of "the band of the white Uno", la banda della Uno bianca
  - Nuclei Armati Rivoluzionari, an Italian neofascist terrorist organization.
5. "Lungimiranza"
  - The "Associazione Ricreativa e Culturale Italiana" (ARCI), an Italian cultural association.
  - Luciano Ligabue
  - Vinicio Capossela
6. "Cioccolato I.A.C.P."
  - The "Istituto Autonomo Case Popolari" (IACP), the Italian public housing organization.
  - Vladivostok
  - Toblerone chocolate
7. "Fermo!"
  - The Chirocephalus marchesonii
  - Monte Vettore
  - The Parco Nazionale dei Monti Sibillini
8. "Onomastica"
  - Jean Jaurès
9. "Venti Minuti"
  - Military Service in Italy

== Personnel ==
- Enrico Fontanelli - bass, keyboards
- Daniele Carretti - guitar, bass
- Max Collini - vocals

=== Other musicians ===
- Francesco Donadello – drums in Ventrale
- Deborah Naomi Walker - cello in Sensibile
- Jukka Reverberi - vocals in Cioccolato I.A.C.P. and Fermo!
- Nicola Manzan - vocals in Cioccolato I.A.C.P.
- Andrea Fumagalli - saxophone in Onomastica
