= Willie Nile (album) =

Studio album by Willie Nile
- Released: February 1980
- Studio: Record Plant, New York City
- Genre: Rock
- Length: 38:38 LP; 42:16 CD
- Label: Arista (1980); Razor & Tie (1992)
- Producer: Roy Halee

Willie Nile chronology
Willie Nile (1980)	Golden Down (1981)

Willie Nile (1980) is the self-titled debut album by the New York singer/songwriter of the same name. Released by Arista Records in early 1980 to critical praise, it was produced and engineered by Roy Halee and featured Jay Dee Daugherty, formerly with Patti Smith, on drums. The album immediately created a buzz among critics and quickly drew the attention of other rock stars such as Pete Townshend and the Who, who invited Nile to join them on their Summer of 1980 US tour. "That's the Reason" is heard during the end credits of the 1981 film Private Lessons.

== Critical reception ==
Professional ratings
Review scores
Source	Rating
AllMusic	4/5 stars
Smash Hits	7/10
Uncut	8/10 stars

Los Angeles Times pop music critic Robert Hilburn described the album as "the kind of rare collection that reawakens you to the inspiring qualities of rock'n'roll". With London Calling by the Clash, the album was voted record of the year for 1980 by Stereo Review magazine. Music critic David Okamoto wrote "his self-titled debut remains one of the most thrilling post-Byrds folk-rock albums of all time". Uncut: "Every song spins superb hooks with a Buddy Holly flair".

== Track listing ==
All songs written by Willie Nile.

No.	Title	Length
1.	"Vagabond Moon"	4:07
2.	"Dear Lord"	2.54
3.	"It's All Over"	3:34
4.	"Across the River"	4:17
5.	"She's So Cold"	2:37
6.	"I'm Not Waiting"	2:35
7.	"That's the Reason"	2:27
8.	"They'll Build a Statue of You"	3:38
9.	"Old Men Sleeping on the Bowery"	3:33
10.	"Behind the Cathedral"	3:06
11.	"Sing Me a Song"	5:23

1992 Razor & Tie CD Edition added track
No.	Title	Length
12.	"Edge of the Earth"	3:34
Total length:		42:16

== Personnel ==
- Willie Nile – Electric and Acoustic guitar, piano, vocals
- Clay Barnes – Electric Guitar, background vocals
- Peter Hoffman – Electric Guitar
- Tom Ethridge – Bass
- Jay Dee Daugherty – Drums, Percussion
- Mark Johnson – Background vocals

Production

- Producers: Roy Halee
- Engineering: Roy Halee
- Remixing: Phil Jamtaas, Record Plant, Los Angeles
- Mastering: Greg Calbi, Sterling Sound, New York, NY
- Cover photo: Christine Olympia Rodin
- Photography: John Noonan, Ron Kellum
- Art Direction: Ron Kellum

== Charts ==
Chart (1980)	Peak position
US Billboard 200	145
