= James Maddock =

English musician (born 1962)

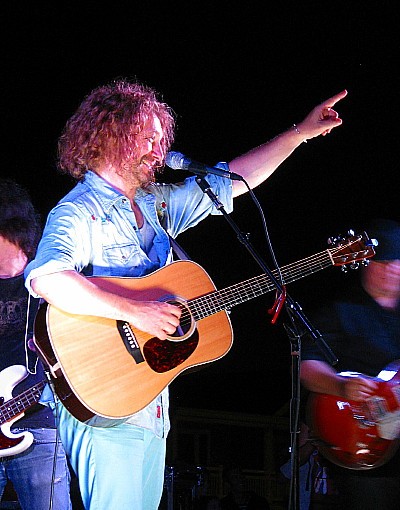
- Maddock playing as part of WBJB Songwriters on the Beach Concert Series in Belmar, NJ in August 2013

Background information
- Born: James Maddock; 1962 (age 63–64); Leicester, England
- Genres: Folk, Rock, Americana
- Occupations: Singer-songwriter, musician
- Instruments: Guitar, voice
- Label: Casa Del Fuego
- Website: jamesmaddock.net

James Maddock (born 1962) is an English singer-songwriter and performing musician. Originally from Countesthorpe, Leicester, Maddock has been based in New York City since 2003.

His first album was Tied Weight in 1982. (Reach Up Records SRO 001). Musicians were, James 'Bam Bam' Barker - drums, keys, percussion. Martyn Lewis - Electric guitar, backing vox. Gary Twist - bass. James played acoustic and electric guitars, mouth organ, and vocals. Produced by Paul Witherspoon

One of his earlier bands, Fire Next Time, which played up-tempo left-wing soul a la the Redskins, released a well-received album North to South on Polydor Records in 1988. The band consisted of James, Nick Muir, Ray Weston, and James O' Malley. String arrangements by Anne Dudley. Produced by Hugh Jones. O' Malley would later follow Maddock into the band Wood. Singles from the album were 'Stay With Me Now' and 'Too Close', both issued in 7" and 12" formats in 1988. A non album single, "I Can't Go Back' was issued in 1987. The band on this single were James, Geoff Sapsford, James O' Malley and Martin Hughes.

Maddock's first public success in the U.S. was with his band Wood, whose album Songs from Stamford Hill produced multiple songs appearing on the hit TV show Dawson's Creek, including the Top 5 single "Stay You".

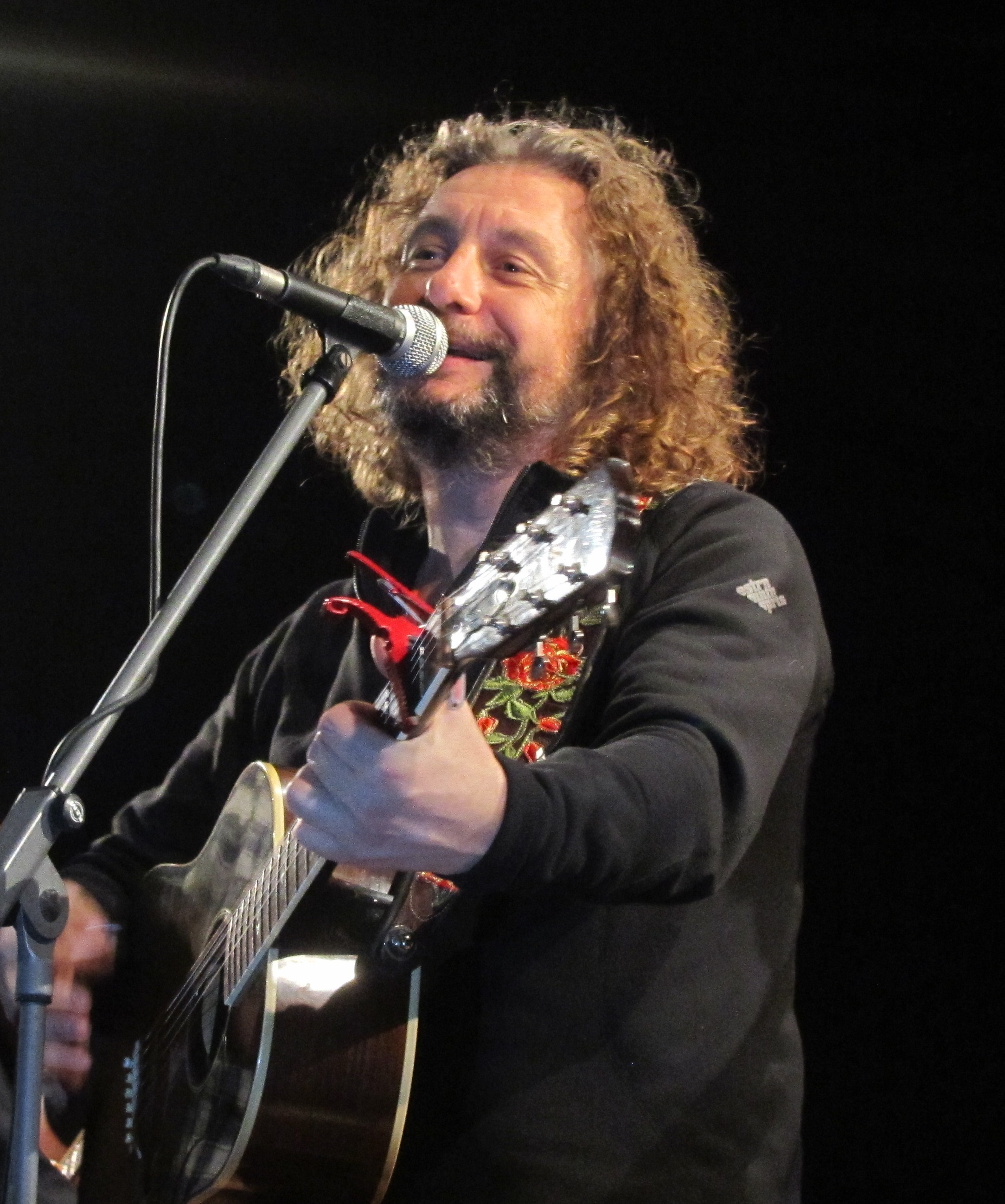
Maddock at Light of Day 2012 in Figino Serenza (Italy)

Maddock, though English, is largely associated with the Americana music style and has performed with Bruce Springsteen. Maddock has since become a solo artist with several albums, including Sunrise on Avenue C (2009) which won the 2010/11 NY Music Award for 'Best Americana Album', and is currently a resident artist at Rockwood Music Hall in New York City.

Maddock's most recent albums, Sunrise on Avenue C, Jimmy & Immy Live at Rockwood Music Hall (with David Immerglück), Wake Up and Dream, James Maddock: Live At Rockwood Music Hall, and Another Life were released by the independent record label Casa Del Fuego.

Another Life has been featured in both American Songwriter magazine and CMT Edge, which calls it "an album that finds [Maddock] crooning an old-school folk ballad one minute and rasping his way through a rusty-edged pop tune the next".

Maddock is represented exclusively by Global Positioning Services in Santa Monica and New York City. Maddock has appeared on CBS This Morning and Late Show with David Letterman.

In 2018 Maddock appeared on Willie Nile's Children of Paradise album, and again in 2020 on New York at Night.

== Discography ==
Studio albums

- Tied Weight (1982, Reach Up label)
- Sunrise on Avenue C (2009)
- Wake Up and Dream (2011)
- Another Life (2013)
- The Green (2015)
- Insanity vs. Humanity (2017)
- If It Ain't Fixed Don't Break It (2019)
- No Time to Cry (2020)
- Little Bird In The Neighborhood (2021)
- Night Work (2023)
- Forever June (2026)

Live albums

- Live at Rockwood Music Hall (2010)
- Jimmy/Immy – Live at Rockwood Music Hall, NYC (with David Immerglück) (2012)
- Live at Daryl's House (2016)
- Live at Masterdisk (2025)

EPs

- Strategies for Life (2007)

with Wood

- Songs from Stamford Hill (1999)

with Fire Next Time

- North to South (1988)

as Jimmy & Immy

- Live in Italia (feat. Alex Valle) (2016)
