= Greg Calbi =

American mastering engineer (born 1949)

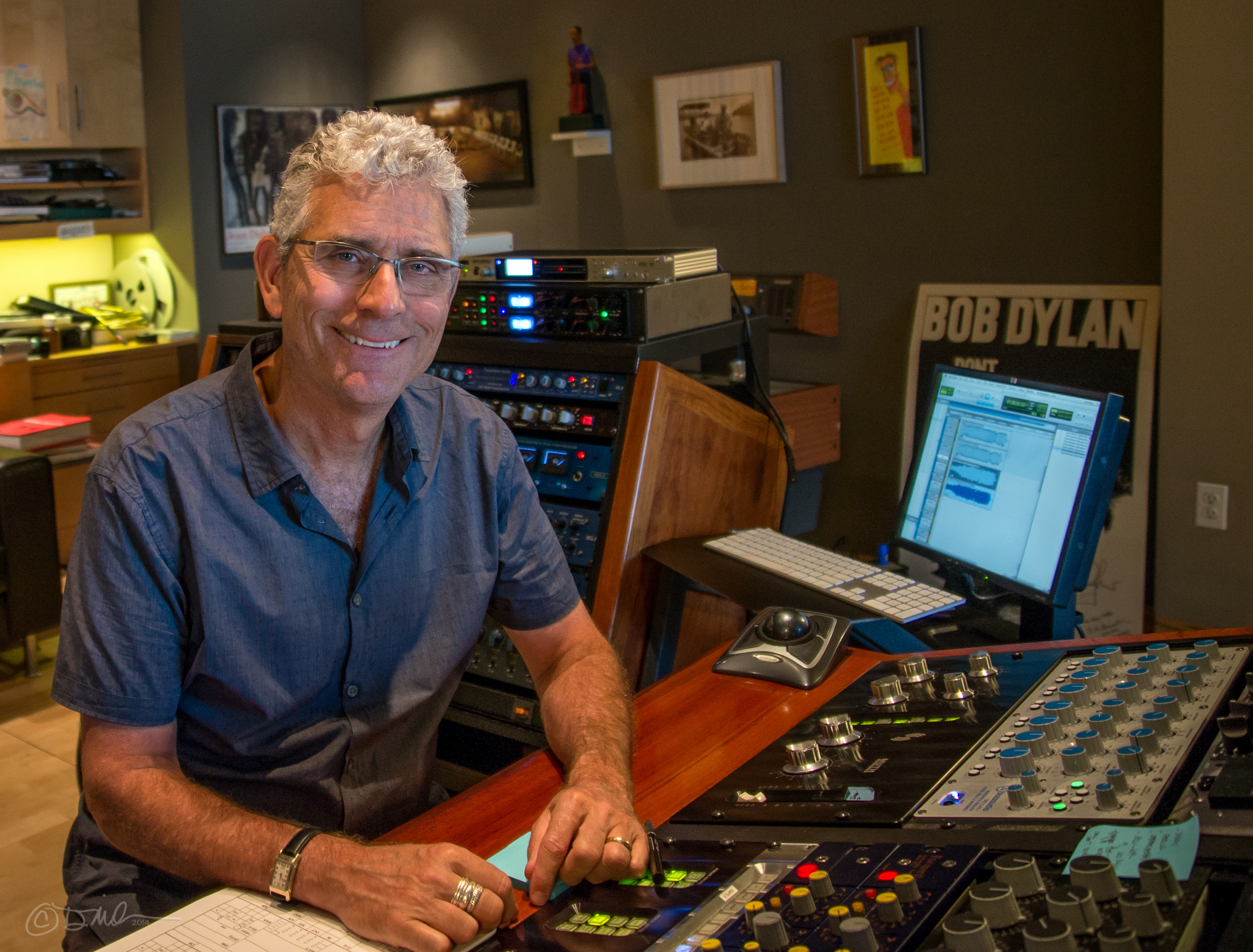
- Calbi in 2014

Background information
- Born: April 3, 1949 (age 77); Yonkers, New York, U.S.
- Occupation: Mastering engineer
- Website: sterling-sound.com/engineers/greg-calbi

Gregory Calbi (born April 3, 1949) is an American mastering engineer at Sterling Sound, New Jersey.

== Biography ==
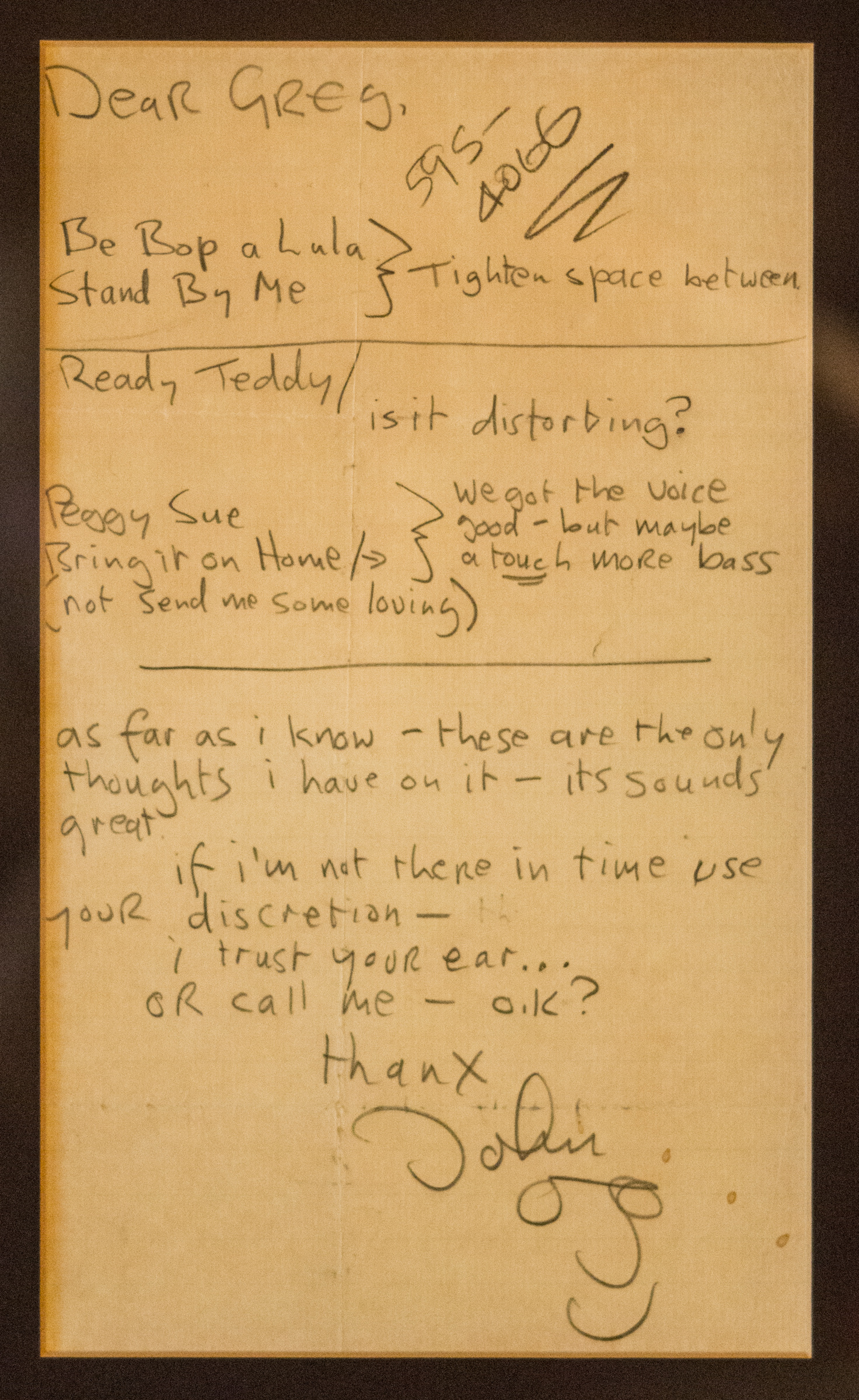
Note to Calbi from John Lennon

Greg Calbi was born on April 3, 1949, in Yonkers, New York, and raised in Bayside, Queens, New York. He graduated in 1966 from Bishop Reilly High School in Fresh Meadows. Calbi earned his bachelor's degree in Mass Communications at Fordham University, where he studied with Marshall McLuhan and his staff for three of those years. He then earned his master's degree in Political Media Studies (Speech Department) at the University of Massachusetts. During these college years, Calbi drove an NYC cab and sold ladies shoes, and was intent on becoming a documentary filmmaker. However, Calbi was asked by someone who worked at the Record Plant studio to drive a truck to Duke University to record the band Yes on their Close to the Edge Tour; soon after that, he began his career in 1972 as an assistant studio engineer at the Record Plant, working alongside engineers Jack Douglas, Jay Messina, Shelly Yakus, and Jimmy Iovine, who was an assistant engineer at that time. In two years, Calbi began cutting vinyl in the mastering room with his high school and college friend, Tom Rabstenek, who had taken over the Cutting Room after George Marino left to work at Sterling Sound. During this time, Calbi helped Tom cut the lacquers for Stevie Wonder's Innervisions, among others, from the notes that George had left. In his first year as a mastering engineer, Calbi mastered his first platinum record, Eric Carmen by Eric Carmen, John Lennon's Walls and Bridges, and in 1975, David Bowie's Young Americans and Bruce Springsteen's Born to Run. Calbi worked at the Record Plant until 1976 when a position was offered to him by Lee Hulko, owner of Sterling Sound.

During his early years at Sterling, Calbi worked alongside Lee Hulko, George Marino, and Ted Jensen and became known for mastering punk classics for the Ramones, Talking Heads, and Patti Smith, as well as Tom Petty, Bill Frisell, Aretha Franklin, and Todd Rundgren, among others. In 1994, Calbi left Sterling for Masterdisk, where he worked until 1998 when he, Ted Jensen, and Tom Coyne, along with Murat Aktar (Absolute Audio co-founder) and UK-based Metropolis, purchased Sterling Sound from Lee Hulko.

== Awards and nominations ==
TEC Awards

Calbi has garnered 12 Mix Foundation TEC Award nominations for Creative Achievement, winning two of them.

Year	Nominee / work	Award	Result
2007	John Mayer, "Waiting on the World to Change" (2006)	Record Production / Single or Track	Won
2007	John Mayer, Continuum (2006)	Record Production, Album	Won

== Selected works ==
Calbi has mastered over 7,500 albums during his career; a list of noteworthy music Calbi has mastered includes:

- 1973: Yoko Ono / Plastic Ono Band, Feeling the Space
- 1973: Lou Reed, Berlin
- 1973: Spooky Tooth, Witness
- 1974: The Chambers Brothers, Unbonded
- 1974: Harry Nilsson, Pussy Cats
- 1974: Three Dog Night, Hard Labor
- 1974: Kansas, Kansas
- 1974: Raspberries, Starting Over
- 1974: John Lennon, Walls and Bridges
- 1975: Eric Carmen, Eric Carmen
- 1975: Bob Dylan, Blood on the Tracks
- 1975: Natalie Cole, Inseparable
- 1975: Tommy Bolin, Teaser
- 1975: John Lennon, Rock 'n' Roll
- 1975: Bruce Springsteen, Born to Run
- 1975: Edgar Winter, Jasmine Nightdreams
- 1975: The Dictators, The Dictators Go Girl Crazy!
- 1975: Blood, Sweat & Tears, New City
- 1975: Blue Öyster Cult, On Your Feet or on Your Knees
- 1975: David Bowie, Young Americans
- 1976: Y&T, Yesterday and Today
- 1976: Harry Chapin, Greatest Stories Live
- 1976: Blondie, Blondie
- 1976: Don McLean, Solo
- 1976: Bay City Rollers, Dedication
- 1976: Foghat, Night Shift
- 1976: Ramones, Ramones
- 1976: Dan Hartman, Images
- 1976: Johnny Winter, Captured Live!
- 1977: Supertramp, Even in the Quietest Moments...
- 1977: Muddy Waters, Hard Again
- 1977: 38 Special, 38 Special
- 1977: Anthony Phillips, The Geese & the Ghost
- 1977: Television, Marquee Moon
- 1977: Ramones, Rocket to Russia
- 1977: Hall & Oates, Beauty on a Back Street
- 1977: Rainbow, On Stage
- 1977: Johnny Winter, Nothin' but the Blues
- 1977: Iggy Pop, Lust for Life
- 1977: Richard Hell and the Voidoids, Blank Generation
- 1977: Go, Go Too
- 1978: Ramones, Road to Ruin
- 1978: Johnny Winter, White, Hot and Blue
- 1978: Meco, Meco Plays The Wizard of Oz
- 1978: 38 Special, Special Delivery
- 1978: David Johansen, David Johansen
- 1978: Steve Camp, Sayin' It with Love
- 1978: Golden Earring, Grab It for a Second
- 1978: Miquel Brown, Symphony of Love
- 1978: Patti Smith Group, Easter
- 1978: The Godz, The Godz
- 1978: The Jam, All Mod Cons
- 1978: Blondie, Plastic Letters
- 1978: Jean-Luc Ponty, Cosmic Messenger
- 1978: Muddy Waters, I'm Ready
- 1978: Roger Glover, Elements
- 1979: Supertramp, Breakfast in America
- 1979: David Bowie, Lodger
- 1979: The Jam, Setting Sons
- 1979: Tom Petty and the Heartbreakers, Damn the Torpedoes
- 1979: Ian Dury and The Blockheads, Do It Yourself
- 1979: Rainbow, Down to Earth
- 1979: Jean-Luc Ponty, A Taste for Passion
- 1979: Tom Robinson Band, TRB Two
- 1979: John McLaughlin, Electric Dreams
- 1979: Enchantment, Journey to the Land Of... Enchantment
- 1979: Meco, Superman & Other Galactic Heroes
- 1979: Richard Lloyd, Alchemy
- 1979: Talking Heads, Fear of Music
- 1980: Dire Straits, Making Movies
- 1980: The Sugarhill Gang, Sugarhill Gang
- 1980: Willie Nile, Willie Nile
- 1980: Talking Heads, Remain in Light
- 1980: Lou Reed, Growing Up in Public
- 1981: The Go-Go's, Beauty and the Beat
- 1981: Art Garfunkel, Scissors Cut
- 1982: Simon & Garfunkel, The Concert in Central Park
- 1982: Luther Vandross, Forever, for Always, for Love
- 1982: Todd Rundgren, The Ever Popular Tortured Artist Effect
- 1982: The B-52's, Mesopotamia EP
- 1982: Lou Reed, The Blue Mask
- 1983: Tom Tom Club, Close to the Bone
- 1983: Bonnie Tyler, Faster Than the Speed of Night
- 1983: Culture Club, Colour by Numbers
- 1983: Lou Reed, Legendary Hearts
- 1983: R.E.M., Murmur
- 1983: Paul Simon, Hearts and Bones
- 1984: Howard Jones, Human's Lib
- 1984: Footloose (original motion picture soundtrack)
- 1984: Ebn Ozn, Feeling Cavalier
- 1984: John Lennon and Yoko Ono, Milk and Honey
- 1984: Deep Purple, Perfect Strangers
- 1985: Johnny Winter, Serious Business
- 1985: Suzanne Vega, Suzanne Vega
- 1985: Aretha Franklin, Who's Zoomin' Who?
- 1985: Bon Jovi, 7800° Fahrenheit
- 1986: Paul Simon, Graceland
- 1988: Eric Clapton, Crossroads
- 1988: Anthrax, State of Euphoria
- 1988: Ramones, Ramones Mania
- 1988: Living Colour, Vivid
- 1989: Bill Frisell, Before We Were Born
- 1989: Doro, Force Majeure
- 1989: Lenny Kravitz, Let Love Rule
- 1991: Paul Simon, Paul Simon's Concert in the Park
- 1991: Anthrax, Attack of the Killer B's
- 1991: Metal Church, The Human Factor
- 1991: Lenny Kravitz, Mama Said
- 1991: Yes, Union
- 1992: Barenaked Ladies, Gordon
- 1993: Laura Branigan, Over My Heart
- 1993: Sarah McLachlan, Fumbling Towards Ecstasy
- 1994: David Sanborn, Pearls
- 1994: Jeff Greene, Wild Onions... Eat Em Raw
- 1995: Cassandra Wilson, New Moon Daughter
- 1996: David Sanborn, Songs from the Night Before
- 1997: Paul McCartney, Flaming Pie
- 1997: Jean-Michel Jarre, Oxygène 7–13
- 1998: Bill Frisell, Gone, Just Like a Train
- 1998: Great Big Sea, Rant and Roar
- 1998: John Sebastian & the J Band, Chasin' Gus' Ghost
- 1999: The Smithereens, God Save The Smithereens
- 1999: Sarah McLachlan, Mirrorball
- 2000: Warren Zevon, Life'll Kill Ya
- 2000: Grandaddy, The Sophtware Slump
- 2000: Rickie Lee Jones, Live at Red Rocks
- 2001: Suzanne Vega, Songs in Red and Gray
- 2001: The Strokes, Is This It
- 2001: David Byrne, Look into the Eyeball
- 2002: Aimee Mann, Lost in Space
- 2002: Future Kings of Spain, Future Kings of Spain
- 2002: Interpol, Turn On the Bright Lights
- 2003: My Morning Jacket, It Still Moves
- 2003: Emmylou Harris, Stumble into Grace
- 2003: Kings of Leon, Holy Roller Novocaine EP
- 2004: Five for Fighting, The Battle for Everything
- 2004: Kaki King, Legs to Make Us Longer
- 2004: Paul Simon, Graceland (remastering)
- 2005: Spoon, Gimme Fiction
- 2006: The Hold Steady, Boys and Girls in America
- 2006: John Mayer, Continuum
- 2006: Jeff Golub, Grand Central
- 2007: David Sanborn, Here & Gone
- 2008: Kings of Leon, Day Old Belgian Blues EP
- 2008: Shemekia Copeland, Never Going Back
- 2008: Offlaga Disco Pax, Bachelite
- 2009: Norah Jones, The Fall
- 2009: Yo La Tengo, Popular Songs
- 2009: Gustavo Cerati, Fuerza natural
- 2010: Jimmy Webb, Just Across the River
- 2010: Bette Midler, Memories of You
- 2010: OK Go, Of the Blue Colour of the Sky
- 2010: The Posies, Blood/Candy
- 2010: Tame Impala, Innerspeaker
- 2010: Madrugada, Industrial Silence (remastering)
- 2011: Bon Iver, Bon Iver
- 2011: Misfits, The Devil's Rain
- 2011: G. Love, Fixin' to Die
- 2011: Drive-By Truckers, Go-Go Boots
- 2011: Levon Helm, Ramble at the Ryman
- 2012: Alabama Shakes, Boys & Girls
- 2012: Tame Impala, Lonerism
- 2012: Branford Marsalis Quartet, Four MFs Playin' Tunes
- 2012: Trey Anastasio, Traveler
- 2012: Passenger, All the Little Lights
- 2013: Yo La Tengo, Fade
- 2013: Willie Nile, American Ride
- 2013: Fall Out Boy, Save Rock and Roll
- 2013: Yeah Yeah Yeahs, Mosquito
- 2013: Bill Frisell, Big Sur
- 2013: Bob James and David Sanborn, Quartette Humaine
- 2013: Tea Leaf Green, In the Wake
- 2013: The National, Trouble Will Find Me
- 2013: St. Vincent, "Birth in Reverse"
- 2013: Sara Bareilles, The Blessed Unrest
- 2014: Lady Gaga and Tony Bennett, Cheek to Cheek
- 2014: OK Go, Hungry Ghosts
- 2014: Willie Nile, If I Was a River
- 2014: Perfume Genius, Too Bright
- 2014: The New Pornographers, Brill Bruisers
- 2015: Sleater-Kinney, No Cities to Love
- 2015: Noel Gallagher's High Flying Birds, Chasing Yesterday
- 2015: Francis Cabrel, In extremis
- 2015: The Bright Light Social Hour, Space Is Still the Place
- 2015: Modest Mouse, Strangers to Ourselves
- 2015: Tame Impala, Currents
- 2015: Reyno, Dualidad
- 2016: Dinosaur Jr., Give a Glimpse of What Yer Not
- 2016: Paul Simon, Stranger to Stranger
- 2016: Band of Horses, Why Are You OK
- 2016: American Football, American Football
- 2016: Bruce Springsteen, Chapter and Verse
- 2016: Norah Jones, Day Breaks
- 2016: Bob Dylan, Fallen Angels
- 2016: The Puzzles, Ringa Belle
- 2016: Frightened Rabbit, Painting of a Panic Attack
- 2016: Jim Hall and Red Mitchell, Valse Hot – Sweet Basil 1978
- 2017: A-ha, MTV Unplugged: Summer Solstice
- 2017: Arcade Fire, Everything Now
- 2017: Bob Dylan, Triplicate
- 2017: Pond, The Weather
- 2017: Cigarettes After Sex, Cigarettes After Sex
- 2017: Fleet Foxes, Crack-Up
- 2017: Foster the People, Sacred Hearts Club
- 2017: John Mayer, The Search for Everything
- 2017: The National, Sleep Well Beast
- 2017: The New Pornographers, Whiteout Conditions
- 2017: The War on Drugs, A Deeper Understanding
- 2017: Valerie June, The Order of Time
- 2018: MGMT, Little Dark Age
- 2018: Big Red Machine, Big Red Machine
- 2018: David Byrne, American Utopia
- 2018: Interpol, Marauder
- 2018: Kacey Musgraves, Golden Hour
- 2018: Kimbra, Primal Heart
- 2018: Ought, Room Inside the World
- 2019: Bon Iver, I, I
- 2019: Joe Jackson, Fool
- 2019: The National, I Am Easy to Find
- 2020: Tame Impala, The Slow Rush
- 2020: Taylor Swift, Evermore
- 2021: The War on Drugs, I Don't Live Here Anymore
- 2022: Adam Trumbo, Modern Communication
- 2022: Joshua Redman, Brad Mehldau, Christian McBride and Brian Blade, LongGone
- 2022: Dan Aid, All My Friends Are Finding New Beliefs
- 2023: Lil Yachty, Let's Start Here
- 2024: The Smile, Wall of Eyes
- 2024: MGMT, Loss of Life
- 2026: Goetia, Unreleased

Catalog remastering highlights:

- 1988: Eric Clapton, Crossroads
- 2010: John Lennon, Signature Box
- 2012: Bob Dylan, Dual Layer DSD/PCM 15 Album Catalog Box set
- 2014: The Beatles, The U.S. Albums
- 2014: Sleater-Kinney, Start Together
- 2014: Tamio Okuda, OT Remasters – 11 albums, 1 DVD
- 2015: Supertramp, Crime of the Century
