= Willie Nile =

American rock and folk musician (born 1948)

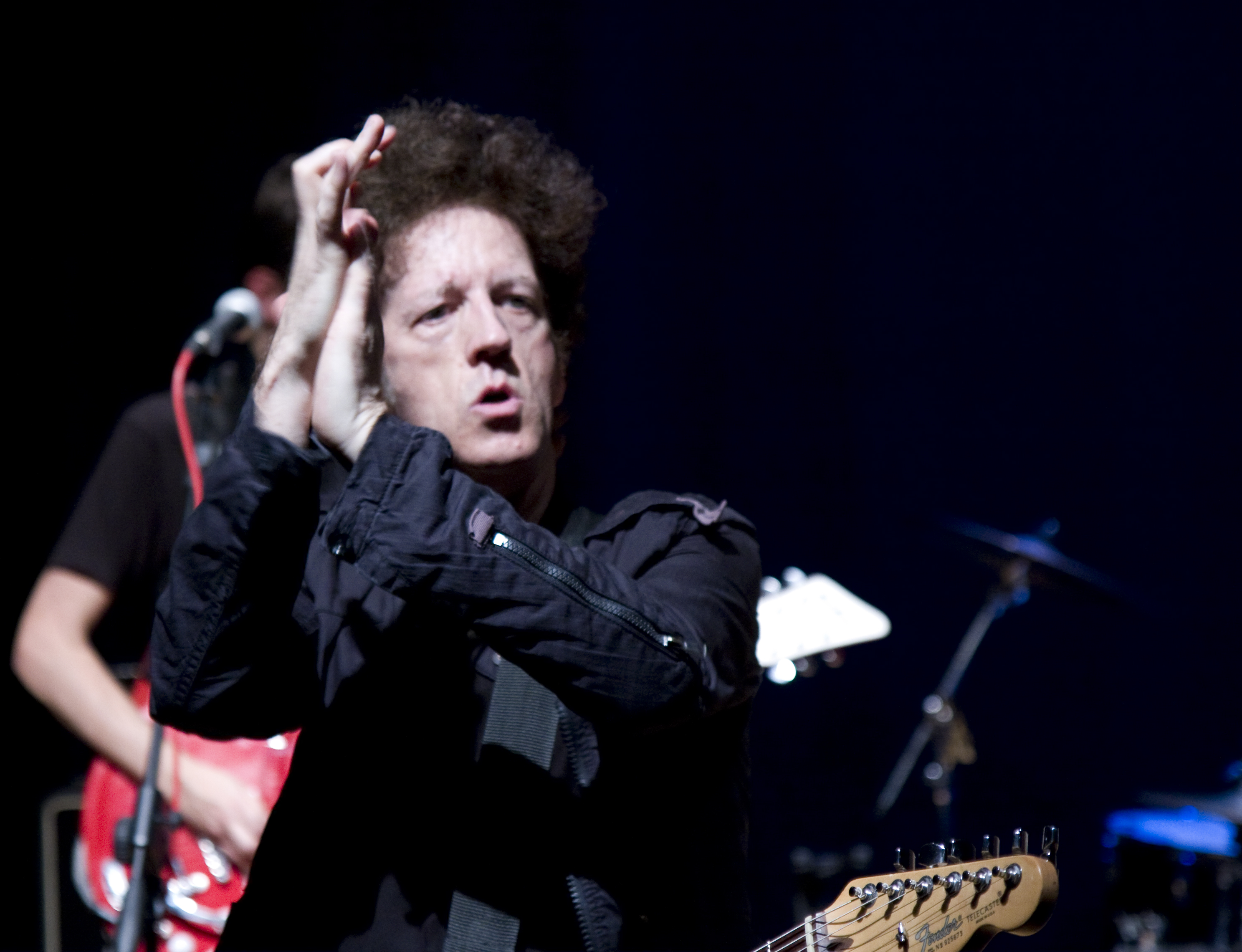
- Nile performing in 2010

Background information
- Born: Robert Anthony Noonan; June 7, 1948 (age 78); Buffalo, New York
- Origin: Buffalo, New York
- Genres: Folk; Alternative; Rock
- Occupation: Singer-songwriter
- Instruments: Vocals; Guitar; Piano; Organ; Harmonica
- Years active: 1976–present
- Labels: Arista; Columbia; Loud & Proud; 00:02:59; River House
- Website: Official website

Willie Nile (born Robert Anthony Noonan; June 7, 1948) is an American singer-songwriter.

In 1980, Nile released his self-titled debut album. His early career was interrupted by various problems, but he eventually returned to recording and performing in the US and Europe, establishing himself as a singer-songwriter.

== Early life ==
Born in Buffalo, New York, into what he called "a gregarious Irish Catholic family". He grew up with two older brothers who played piano, and a mother who "used to always have music in the house. Whether it was classical or big band or popular hits of the times, something was always playing." His grandfather ran an orchestra in Buffalo and was a vaudeville pianist who played with Bill "Bojangles" Robinson and Eddie Cantor.

Nile studied philosophy at the University at Buffalo and lived in Greenwich Village while beginning his music career. He contracted pneumonia and wrote songs while he spent a year recuperating. Afterward, he began frequenting such clubs as CBGB, where he saw performers including Patti Smith, Television, the Ramones, and Talking Heads.

== Career ==
=== Early years ===
Nile established residency at Kenny's Castaways, a Greenwich Village club, where he was discovered by New York Times music critic Robert Palmer who described Nile as "the most gifted songwriter to emerge from the New York folk scene in some while". This led to a meeting with Clive Davis and a record deal with Arista Records. He went into the studio with a band that included Jay Dee Daugherty from the Patti Smith Group and Fred Smith from Television. He was described by Stephen Holden of the New York Times as a "live wire" in concerts.

Following the release of his debut album, Willie Nile, he joined The Who's 1980 summer tour.

After his second album 1981's Golden Down, Nile became involved with protracted legal problems which curtailed his career for a number of years.

=== Re-emergence ===
Although he continued to write, Nile did not perform live or record again until a 1987 performance in Oslo, Norway, with Eric Andersen. A videotape of Nile's performance in Norway prompted a Columbia talent scout to sign him to the label in 1988. For reasons that are unclear, production on his album did not start for two more years. It was another significant delay in the troubadour's career. Issued in 1991, his Columbia Records CD, Places I Have Never Been, contained the songs "Everybody Needs A Hammer" and "Heaven Help The Lonely". Places I Have Never Been featured appearances by backing musicians including Richard Thompson, Loudon Wainwright III, Roger McGuinn, and members of The Hooters and The Roches. On June 11, 1991, Nile was the guest musician on the Late Night with David Letterman show.

Nile has recorded and performed with several musicians, including Ringo Starr, Tori Amos, Elvis Costello, Lucinda Williams, Ian Hunter, and Barenaked Ladies. A live Central Park concert album, Willie Nile-Archive Alive, was released on Archive Recordings, and Nile was one of the vocalists on the 1998 ensemble album Largo, along with Joan Osborne, Cyndi Lauper, Levon Helm, The Chieftains, Taj Mahal and Carole King. Another project found Nile writing and performing most of the songs for the soundtrack to the Kevin McLaughlin film Pinch Me!.

Gathering together his resources over time, he put out his first self-released album, Beautiful Wreck of the World, in 1999. It was chosen as one of the Top Ten Albums of the Year by critics at Billboard magazine, The Village Voice and Stereo Review.

Lucinda Williams called "On the Road to Calvary", Nile's song for Jeff Buckley, "One of the most beautiful songs I've ever heard". The album reached the finals of the Independent Music Awards for Best Rock Album of the Year.

=== 21st-century renaissance ===
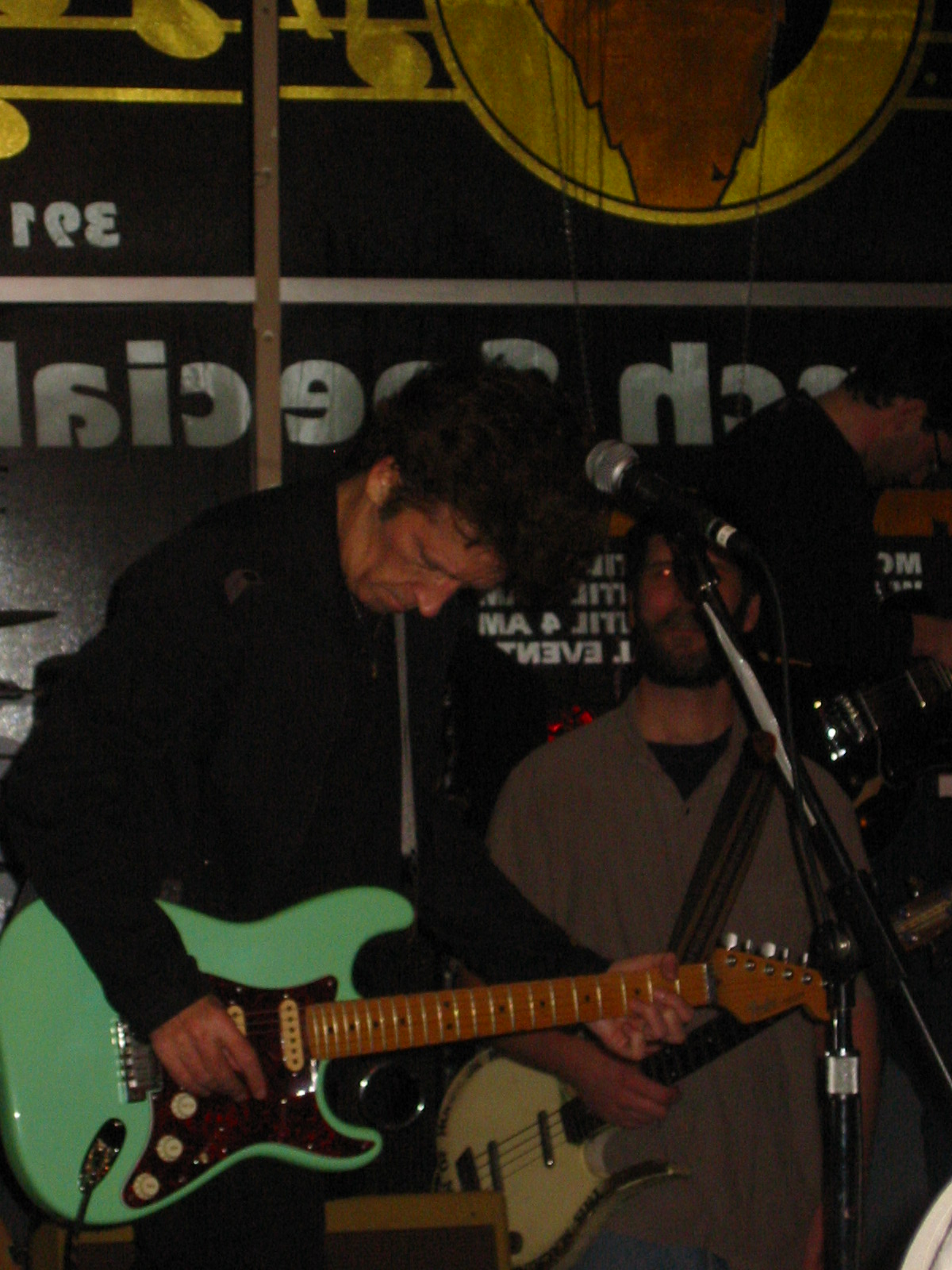
Nile at the Buffalo Tap Room, 2008. Former bassist John Honan in background.

In late 2003, Nile was invited to share the stage at three concerts with the E Street Band, including the two final Giants Stadium shows as well as the two last shows of that particular tour at Shea Stadium.

In 2006, Nile released Streets of New York to good reviews. Former Time magazine music critic, and Academy Award-winning screenwriter, Jay Cocks writes of Streets of New York, "The tunes he writes and plays with such blowtorch vibrancy get the myth and magic and danger and sadness and love in this town—of this town—truer, and righter, than anything I've heard since Dion. This record is a head-twister and heart-wrencher. It's rock and roll at its best. It's New York at its best. And there's nothing better than that."

House of a Thousand Guitars was released to positive reviews on April 14, 2009.

On November 22, 2009, Nile joined the E Street Band for the cover of Jackie Wilson's "Higher and Higher".

On April 23, 2013, at a ceremony in Leeds, England, Nile was named Legacy Ambassador for the Buddy Holly Educational Foundation.

On June 25, 2013, Nile released his eighth studio album, American Ride through Loud & Proud Records. Nile originally had planned on self-distributing through money raised on PledgeMusic.com. The decision to sign onto a record label occurred after he was approached by Tom Lipsky, president of Loud & Proud Records. The New Yorker said "One of the most brilliant (and most confounding) singer-songwriters of the last thirty years... he reappeared this year with "American Ride", another stellar album of tough, insightful rock and roll.

On November 11, 2014, Nile released If I Was a River, a 10-track all piano album, composed by Nile with assistance from his long-time collaborator Frankie Lee.

At a surprise appearance at the 2015 Light of Day Benefit in Asbury Park, New Jersey, Bruce Springsteen joined Nile on stage to perform Nile's "One Guitar". On May 28, 2015, at the Best Buy Theatre in New York City, Nile joined Springsteen, Joan Jett, Roger Daltrey and Billy Idol at the 11th annual MusiCares MAP Fund benefit concert to honor Pete Townshend, for his commitment to helping other musicians with addictions.

On July 27, 2018, Nile released the album Children of Paradise. The album was well received and given excellent reviews. Associated Press' Kiley Armstrong says it is "his best album to date". In a July 2018 review of the album Audiophilie says "Willie Nile has a lot to say and clearly some great songs in his back pocket. You just need to listen. If you have even a bit of conscience remaining, you should listen to Willie's albums of the last 10 years or so. You might just get inspired by his 21st century renaissance".

On March 15, 2020, Nile released his 13th studio album, New York at Night. Nile described it as "throwing another log on the fire", defining his passion for his music. Along with the title track, the album included the previously released "Run Free", "New York is Rockin'" which he co-wrote with Curtis Stigers for Stigers' 1995 album Time Was, "Surrender the Moon", a song he started with his brother John, who died years ago, and reflections on love; "A Little Bit of Love", "The Last Time We Made Love", and "Downtown Girl". American Songwriter magazine rated the album 3½ of 5 stars and said that Nile belongs in a class of New York songwriters with Dion. Lou Reed, Patti Smith, Garland Jeffreys, The Ramones, New York Dolls and others. Giving the album an 88/100 rating, Elmore Magazine says "Jersey has Bruce Springsteen, but New York has Willie Nile".

In 2022, Nile's 2006 album Streets of New York was chosen "Classic American Album" by David Jarman of Americana-UK.

Nile embarked on a Caribbean cruise in December of 2024, known as "The Willie Nile Caribbean Adventure." This event featured meet and greets, Q&A's, and two private concerts with Nile and his band. <https://fanclubcruises.com/event/willie-nile-band-caribbean-adventure> This trip led privileged guests on a quest through Orlando, Mexico and The Bahamas. Nile took to social media platforms, among Instagram and Facebook, expressing his immense joy at the success of the cruise.

In February 2026, Dean Nardi did an extensive interview of Willie in AmericanaUK: Willie Nile keeps the light on for great American rock’n’roll.

In May of 2026, music industry analyst and critic Bob Lefsetz said of Willie: "I'm telling you if Willie Nile is playing anywhere near you to go and see him. You won’t be disappointed. But more than that you’ll be inspired, you’ll marvel, you’ll say THIS IS IT! And it is" .

== Band members ==
Current

- Jimi K. Bones – guitar
- Johnny Pisano – electric and upright bass, backing vocals
- Jon Weber – drums

Former

- Brad Albetta – electric & acoustic Bass
- Matt Hogan – lead guitar
- Ali Wilson – drums (UK shows only)
- Alex Alexander – drums, percussion
- Clay Barnes – guitars
- Jay Dee Daugherty – drums and percussion
- Peter Hoffman – guitars
- Rich Pagano – drums, percussion, background vocals
- Fred Smith – bass
- Andy York – lead guitar, background vocals
- John Honan – Bass
- Erick Apen – Lead guitar, background vocals
- Tom Noonan – Background vocals, Guitar

== Discography ==
=== Studio albums ===
Year	Title
1980	Willie Nile
1981	Golden Down
1991	Places I Have Never Been
1999	Beautiful Wreck of the World
2006	Streets of New York
2009	House of a Thousand Guitars
2010	The Innocent Ones
2013	American Ride
2014	If I Was a River
2016	World War Willie
2017	Positively Bob: Willie Nile Sings Bob Dylan
2018	Children of Paradise
2020	New York at Night
2021	The Day the Earth Stood Still
2025	The Great Yellow Light

=== Other releases ===
Year	Title	Format
1992	Hard Times in America	EP
1997	Live in Central Park – Archive Alive!	Live CD
2007	Live at Turning Point	Live CD
2008	Live From the Streets of New York	Live CD & DVD
2011	Live Hard Times in the UK	Live CD
2015	The Bottom Line Archive Live (1980 and 2000)	Live CD
2024	Live at Daryl's House Club	Live CD

=== Other appearances ===
Year	Album	Contribution
1990	Acoustic Christmas	"We Wish You a Merry Christmas"
1991	Stages: The Lost Album	Electric Guitar, various songs
1995	Troubadours of Folk, Vol. 5	"Behind the Cathedral"
1998	Largo	"Medallion"
2003	Light of Day: A Tribute to Bruce Springsteen	"I'm On Fire"
2007	The Sandinista! Project	"Police on My Back"
2007	The Dream Jam Band	Composer, performer
2012	Music is Love: A Singer-Songwriters' Tribute to The Music of CSN&Y	"Rockin' in The Free World"
2020	Blue Rose Collection 13	"Trouble Down in Diamond Town"
2024	Silver Patron Saints – The Songs of Jesse Malin	"All the Way from Moscow"

== Awards ==
- 1980 Sterio Review Magazine – Willie Nile – Record of the Year
- 2005 Nile was inducted into the Buffalo Music Hall of Fame.
- 2013 Winner – AIM Independent Music Awards: "One Guitar" – Best Social Action Song
- 2013 Nominee – AIM Independent Music Awards: "The Innocent Ones" – Best Album Rock/Hard Rock
- 2014 Nominee – AIM Independent Music Awards: "American Ride" – Best Album Rock/Hard Rock
- 2018 Nominee – AIM Independent Music Awards: "Earth Blues" – Best Social Action Short Form Music Video
