= Elmore Magazine =

American music magazine

- Categories: Music
- Publisher: Suzanne Cadgene
- Founded: 2005
- First issue: June 2005
- Final issue: July 2014
- Country: United States
- Based in: New York City
- Language: English
- Website: ElmoreMagazine.com

Elmore is an American music magazine founded in 2005 by Suzanne Cadgène and Arnie Goodman. The magazine covers genres including roots, rhythm and blues, jazz, rock'n'roll, country, folk and Americana. After ten years as a print publication, in July 2014 Elmore transitioned to an online format, supplemented by its monthly e-newsletter, the E-more.

Elmore's motto is: "Saving American Music". In 2012, the magazine was inducted into the New York Blues Hall of Fame.

== Content ==
The name of the magazine was inspired by bluesman Elmore James, although Cadgène also explained, "Elmore James was certainly a factor, but Elmore is a funky, American, down-home name. I don't know any 'Sir Elmores.'"

Elmore feature stories take a wide and artist-centric perspective on the state of American music. Several features have been written by noted artists themselves, including Little Feat's Bill Payne and longtime rock photographer Paul Natkin. Other feature stories include contributions from artists like Martha Reeves, the Zombies' Rod Argent and the Kinks' Dave Davies sharing their firsthand memories of their breakthrough years in 1964, and well-known music photographers like Henry Diltz, Mick Rock, Bob Gruen, Ebet Roberts, Dick Waterman and Danny Clinch explaining what makes a great rock photo.
