= Stewart Lerman =

American record producer

- Genres: Pop; Rock Jazz
- Occupations: Music Producer; Recording Engineer
- Years active: 35yrs

Stewart Lerman is a Bronx born, New York–based, 2x Grammy winning music producer (3x nominated) and recording engineer.

== Artists ==
Artists Lerman has worked with include:

- Angelique Kidjo
- Antony and the Johnsons
- Black 47
- Carl Hancock Rux
- Charli XCX
- Crash Test Dummies
- Dar Williams
- Darden Smith
- David Byrne
- David Johansen
- Elvis Costello
- Jules Shear
- Julian Casablancas
- Liza Minnelli
- Loudon Wainwright III
- Lucy Wainwright Roche
- Marshall Crenshaw
- Mumford and Sons
- Neko Case
- Nellie McKay
- Patti Smith
- Regina Spektor
- The Roches
- Sharon Van Etten
- Shawn Colvin
- Sophie B. Hawkins
- Soulive
- St. Vincent
- Sufjan Stevens
- Vince Giordano
- Willie Nile

== Film and television ==
- 58 episodes of Boardwalk Empire
- 10 episodes of HBO's Vinyl.

He has also produced music for the following films:

- The Aviator
- Revolutionary Road
- Grey Gardens
- The Royal Tenenbaums
- The Life Aquatic
- Mildred Pierce
- Moonrise Kingdom
- School of Rock, Bessie
- The Knick, Begin Again

The Irishman, Killers of the Flower Moon, Joker, Wizard of Lies, Priscilla, Marvelous Mrs. Maisel, etc

He has worked with directors Woody Allen, Wes Anderson, John Carney, Todd Haynes, Barry Levinson, Frank Oz, Martin Scorsese.
