= TMF Awards =

Dutch and Belgian television awards

- Awarded for: Music and pop culture
- Country: Netherlands
- Presented by: TMF
- First award: 1996
- Final award: 2011

TMF Awards
- Awarded for: Music and pop culture
- Country: Belgium
- Presented by: TMF
- First award: October 22, 1999; 27 years ago
- Final award: October 10, 2009; 17 years ago

The TMF Awards were an annual television awards show broadcast live on TMF (The Music Factory).

The first Dutch TMF Awards were held in 1995, as a brand extension to the recently launched local Dutch music channel TMF. The show was very small and held in the company cafeteria. However throughout the years the event gradually moved to bigger venues, and for some time now, it is now being held in Rotterdam Ahoy, a venue which can seat 10,000 people. In 2006, the show was held in the 'Heineken Music Hall' in Amsterdam.

Since 1998 (with the arrival of the Belgian channel, broadcasting in Dutch, purely for the Flemish part of the country) a second TMF Awards show was launched. It started out in a local Antwerp Disco called 'Zillion' (which no longer exists, for a crowd of 2,000 people), and gradually moved to Flanders Expo in Gent (for a crowd of 8,000 people). The past couple of years leading up to 2007, the Belgian edition has surpassed the Dutch edition after it moved to the Sportpaleis Merksem in Antwerp (for a crowd of 17,000 people). In 2007, the TMF awards moved to the Ethias Arena in Hasselt (for a crowd of 21,600 people.)

Both the Dutch & Belgian TMF Awards were broadcast live in Belgium (Flanders) and the Netherlands. About a week later, they were shown on TMF UK. The Dutch show usually took place in April; the Belgian show in October. In 2006 both shows were held in October.

== Winners (Belgium) ==
=== 2009 ===
==== National awards ====
- Best Video: Jasper Erkens-Waiting Like a Dog
- Best Urban: Hadise
- Best Album: Sylver - Sacrifice
- Best Male Artist: Jasper Erkens
- Best Female Artist: Natalia
- Best Pop: Clouseau
- Best Rock: Nailpin
- Best Dance: Milk Inc.
- Best Live: Milk Inc.
- Best New Artist: Jasper Erkens

==== International awards ====
- Best Video: Jonas Brothers - Paranoid
- Best Urban: The Black Eyed Peas
- Best Album: The Black Eyed Peas - The E.N.D.
- Best Male Artist: Justin Timberlake
- Best Female Artist: Lady Gaga
- Best Pop: Lady Gaga
- Best Rock: Kings of Leon
- Best Dance: Bob Sinclar
- Best Live: Beyoncé
- Best New Artist: Lady Gaga

First named is the best national nominee, second was best international one.

=== 2008 ===
- Best Rock: Nailpin, Fall Out Boy
- Best Dance: Milk Inc., Tocadisco
- Best Live: Milk Inc., Fall Out Boy
- Best Alternative: The Black Box Revelation, Fall Out Boy
- Best Male Artist: Koen Buyse, Bill Kaulitz
- Best Female Artist: Natalia, Rihanna
- Best Pop: Natalia, Mika
- Best Urban: Brahim, Kat DeLuna
- Best Album: Milk Inc. (with Forever), Coldplay (with Viva la vida)
- Best New Artist: The Ditch, Kat DeLuna
- Best Video: Nailpin (with The ending), Tokio Hotel (with Don't jump)
- Lifetime Achievement Award: Hooverphonic

=== 2007 ===
- Best Album: Zornik: Crosses, Tokio Hotel: Scream
- Best Alternative: Goose, Fall Out Boy
- Best Dance: Milk Inc., Chemical Brothers
- Best Female Artist: Natalia, Nelly Furtado
- Best Male Artist: Koen Buyse, Justin Timberlake
- Best Live: Zornik, Within Temptation
- Best New Artist: Milow, Tokio Hotel
- Best Pop: Clouseau, Tokio Hotel
- Best Rock: Nailpin,
- Best Urban: Hadise, Timbaland
- Best Video: Zornik: Black Hope Shot Down, Tokio Hotel: Monsoon
- Best Game: Singstar Rocks
- Best Bullybeaters Commercial: The Hug
- Lifetime Achievement Award: Clouseau

=== 2006 ===
- Best Video: Nailpin: Worn out, Panic! at the Disco: I write sins not tragedies
- Best Urban: Hadise, Rihanna
- Best Album: Zornik: Alien Sweetheart, Pussycat Dolls: PCD
- Best Male Artist: Koen Buyse, Justin Timberlake
- Best Female Artist: Katerine, Kelly Clarkson
- Best Pop: Katerine, Kelly Clarkson
- Best Rock: Zornik, Red Hot Chili Peppers
- Best Dance: Milk Inc., Bob Sinclar
- Best Live: Zornik, Anouk
- Best Alternative: dEUS, Panic! at the Disco
- Best New Artist: Udo, The Veronicas
- Best Game: Singstar Rocks
- Totally TMF Award for Outstanding Achievement in Music: Tiësto

=== 2005 ===
- Best Female Artist: Anastacia, Belle Perez, Anouk
- Best Male Artist: Koen Wauters, Marco Borsato
- Best Rock: Zornik, Green Day
- Best Pop: Natalia, Gwen Stefani
- Best Urban: 't Hof van Commerce, The Black Eyed Peas
- Best Dance: Milk Inc., Faithless
- Best Video: Stash (with Sadness), Anouk (with Girl)
- Best Ringtone: Dave McCullen (with B*tch)
- Best Album: Natalia (with Back For More), Anouk (with Hotel New York)
- Best DJ: DJ Wout, Tiësto
- Best New Artist: Katerine, Kelly Clarkson
- Best Game: De Sims 2
- Radio Donna Award for best Single: Sandrine (with Goosebumps)

=== 2004 ===
- Beste zangeres: Natalia, Anastacia
- Beste zanger: Koen Wauters, Marco Borsato
- Meest beloved: Leki, Jamelia
- Beste dj: 2 Many DJs, Tiësto
- Beste R&B/rap: Leki, Usher
- Beste dance: Milk Inc., Freestylers
- Beste pop: Natalia, Anastacia
- Beste rock: Zornik, Evanescence
- Beste live-act: Clouseau, N.E.R.D.
- Beste album: Novastar (with Another Lonely Soul), The Black Eyed Peas (with Elephunk)
- Beste clip: Zornik (with Scared Of Yourself), The Black Eyed Peas (with Shut Up)
- Radio Donna award voor beste single: Freestylers (with Push up)
- Lifetime achievement Milk Inc.

=== 2003 ===
- Best zangeres: Sarah Bettens, Christina Aguilera
- Best zanger: Koen Wauters, Robbie Williams
- Best pop: Clouseau, Steps
- Best rock: Janez Detd., U2
- Best live-act: Clouseau, The Offspring
- Best R&B/rap: 't Hof van Commerce, Will Smith
- Best dance: Milk Inc., Basement Jaxx
- Meest belovend: Brahim, Westlife
- Best album: Janez Detd. (for Anti Anthem), Christina Aguilera (for Stripped)
- Best single: Jasper Steverlinck (Life On Mars)
- Best video: Sylver (for Why Worry), Christina Aguilera (for Fighter)

=== 2002 ===
- Best zangeres: Anastacia, Kate Ryan, Jennifer Lopez
- Best zanger: Koen Wauters, Jon Bon Jovi
- Best pop: Clouseau, Atomic Kitten
- Best rock: Zornik, Within Temptation
- Best R&B/rap: 't Hof van Commerce, Eminem
- Best dance: Milk Inc., Faithless
- Meest belovend: Flesh And Bones, Avril Lavigne
- Best dj: 2 Many DJs, Tiësto
- Best clip: Kate Ryan (for Desenchantée), Avril Lavigne (for Complicated)

=== 2001 ===
- Beste zangeres: Geike (of Hooverphonic), Jennifer Lopez
- Beste zanger: Gene (of X-Session), Robbie Williams
- Beste single: Lasgo (with Something), Faithless (with We Come 1)
- Beste pop: X-Session, Atomic Kitten
- Beste rock: Das Pop, U2
- Beste live-act: Hooverphonic, Faithless
- Beste R&B/rap: ABN, Destiny's Child
- Beste dance: Milk Inc., Faithless
- Meest belovend: Zornik, Blue
- Beste album: Hooverphonic (with The Magnificent Tree), Destiny's Child (with Survivor)
- Beste clip: Milk Inc. with Never Again, Christina, Mýa, Pink & Lil' Kim with "Lady Marmalade"

=== 2000 ===
- Beste zangeres: Sarah Bettens, Britney Spears
- Beste zanger: Jasper Steverlinck (of Arid), Ronan Keating
- Beste single: Milk Inc. (met Walk On Water), Bomfunk MC's (with Freestyler)
- Beste pop: X-Session, Westlife
- Beste rock: Soulwax, Live
- Beste live-act: Praga Khan, Live
- Beste R&B/rap: ABN, Destiny's Child
- Beste dance: Da Boy Tommy, Alice DeeJay
- Meest belovend: Janez Detd., Krezip
- Beste album: Novastar (met Novastar), Moby (with Play)
- Beste clip: Soulwax (met Much Against Everyone's Advice), Aqua (with Cartoon Heroes)

=== 1999 ===
- Beste zangeres: Sarah Bettens, Britney Spears
- Beste zanger: Koen Wauters, Robbie Williams
- Beste single: Nunca (with House Of Doom), Sasha (with If You Believe)
- Beste pop: Clouseau, Steps
- Beste rock: Soulwax, U2
- Beste live-act: Praga Khan, The Offspring
- Beste R&B/rap: 't Hof van Commerce, Will Smith
- Beste dance: Milk Inc., Basement Jaxx
- Meest belovend: Eden, Westlife
- Beste album: Mackenzie ft. Jessy, The Offspring (with Americana)
- Beste clip: Soulwax (with 2 Many DJs), Will Smith (with Wild Wild West)

== Line-up ==
=== 2008 ===
- Nailpin Openingsact
- Fall Out Boy Slotact
- National: Milow, Natalia, Milk Inc., Brahim, Sandrine, Freaky Age, Kate Ryan, Zornik, Hooverphonic, 2 Fabiola
- International: Alphabeat, Kat DeLuna, Freemasons, Tocadisco, Ironik

=== 2007 ===
- Zornik Openingsact
- Regi feat. Bart Peeters, Scala en Milk Inc. Slotact
- National: Milow, Natalia, Clouseau, Katerine, Hadise, urban medley with Crush 5, Leki, Kaye Styles and Lunaman, Goose, Fixkes, Stan van Samang, Kate Ryan
- International: Tokio Hotel, Avril Lavigne, Lumidee, Within Temptation, Mutya Buena, Air Traffic

== Locations ==
=== Netherlands ===
- 1996: Bussum
- 1997: Statenhal, The Hague
- 1998-2005: Rotterdam Ahoy, Rotterdam
- 2006-2007: Heineken Music Hall, Amsterdam
- 2009: Erasmusbrug, Rotterdam
- 2010: Volkspark, Enschede
- 2011: Javakade, Amsterdam

=== Belgium ===
- 22 October 1999: Zillion, Antwerp
- 28 October 2000: Flanders Expo, Ghent
- 27 October 2001: Flanders Expo, Ghent
- 28 October 2002: Flanders Expo, Ghent
- 27 October 2003: Sportpaleis, Antwerp
- 2 October 2004: Sportpaleis, Antwerp
- 1 October 2005: Sportpaleis, Antwerp
- 14 October 2006: Sportpaleis, Antwerp
- 13 October 2007: Ethias Arena, Hasselt
- 11 October 2008: Sportpaleis, Antwerp

== Presentation ==
=== Belgium ===
- 1999:
  - Host: Inge Moerenhout
  - Co-Host: Roos Van Acker
- 2000:
  - Host: Inge Moerenhout
  - Co-Host: Elke Vanelderen
- 2001:
  - Host: Inge Moerenhout
  - Co-Host: Stijn Smets
- 2002:
  - Host: Katja Retsin
  - Co-Host: Olivier Coumans
- 2003:
  - Hosts: Elke Vanelderen & Evi Hanssen
  - Co-Host: Caren Meynen
- 2004:
  - Hosts: Stijn Smets & Leki
  - Co-Host: Caren Meynen
- 2005:
  - Hosts: An Lemmens & Olivier Coumans
  - Co-Host: Caren Meynen
- 2006:
  - Hosts: An Lemmens & Olivier Coumans
  - Co-Host: Caren Meynen
- 2007:
  - Hosts: Lynn Pelgroms & Olivier Coumans
  - Co-Hosts: An Lemmens & Sean d'Hondt
- 2008:
  - Host: Olivier Coumans
  - Co-Hosts: Caren Meynen, Sofie Engelen, Wendy Huyghe, Sean d'Hondt, Astrid Demeure, Stijn Smets & Lynn Pelgroms
