= Crossroads (Sylver album) =

Studio album by Sylver
- Released: 2006
- Genre: Trance, Pop
- Label: Zeitgeist
- Producer: Regi Penxten, Wout Van Dessel

Sylver chronology
Nighttime Calls (2004)	Crossroads (2006)	2001-2007 - The Hit Collection (2007)

Crossroads is the fourth dance album, which was released by the Belgian duo Sylver in 2006.

Track listing

1. Lay All Your Love On Me (3:32)
2. Why (2:53)
3. One Night Stand (3:49)
4. Dance With Loneliness (3:40)
5. You And I (3:36)
6. Lovesong (3:52)
7. Half As Much (3:18)
8. On My Own (2:34)
9. Seven Tears(3:29)
10. Keep Your Hands (4:00) feat. [Linda Mertens]
11. Except Me (2:54)
12. The End (4:01)
13. Take Me Back (3:19)

== Credits ==
The songs "One Night Stand", "Dance With Loneliness", "You And I", "Half As Much", "On My Own", "Seven Tears", "Except Me" and "The End" were composed by Regi Penxten. The song "Why" was written-by Jean-Paul De Coster and Phil Wilde, and used the melody of 2 Unlimited's hit "No Limit". "Lovesong" was composed by Silvy De Bie. "Keep Your Hands" featured vocals from Linda Mertens.

== Charts ==
Chart (2001)	Peak position
Germany Albums Charts	39
Belgian Albums Chart	9
