= Silvy De Bie =

Belgian singer

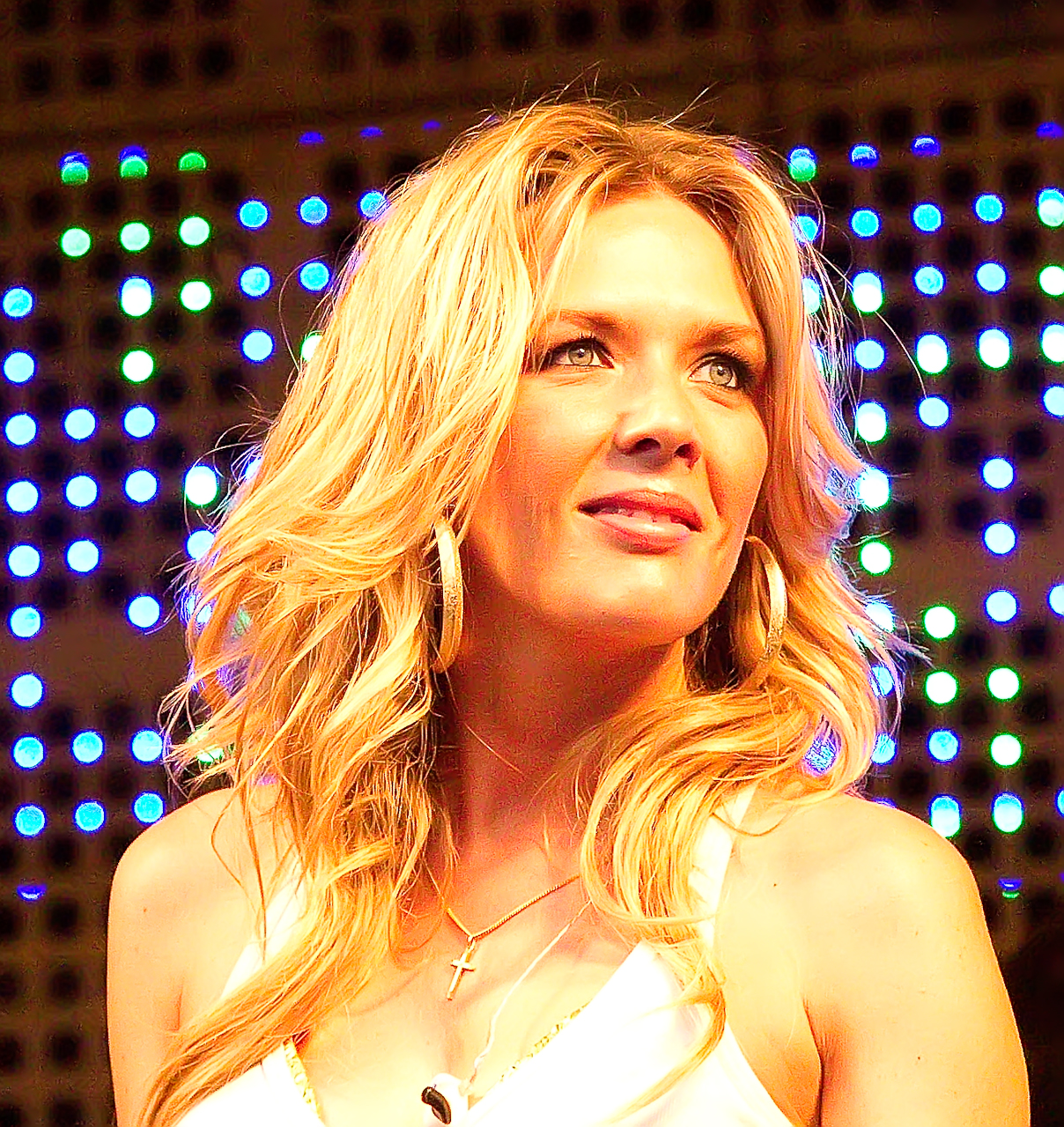
- De Bie (2010)

Background information
- Also known as: Silvy Melody; Sil
- Born: Silvy De Bie; 4 January 1981 (age 45); Heist-op-den-Berg, Belgium
- Genres: Pop, dance
- Instrument: Vocals
- Years active: 2000–present
- Labels: Temprogressive, B² (Byte Blue), Beat Buzz Records, Antler-Subway, Dropout

Silvy De Bie (born 4 January 1981), also known as Sil (stylised as SIL) or Silvy Melody, is a Belgian singer. She is the vocalist for the dance music group Sylver.

== Career ==
Silvy was born in Heist-op-den-Berg, and became a Flanders child star when she was nine years old. She sang "Ben" (a Michael Jackson song written by Walter Scharf) on the Flemish showbiz TV show De Kinderacademie ("Child Academy"). The show was not a contest, but an entertainment program, where children between 4 and 12 years old could perform an act (singing act, dance act, telling a little fairy tale or poem etc.).

Her performance was so well-received that an independent recording studio signed her to a contract. Under the name Silvy Melody, she recorded some songs (including a Dutch version of "Ben") as a solo artist and also some numbers together with other famous Belgian singers. Many of her songs were in the top 10 charts. Her career as a child star stopped abruptly in 1994 due to the Belgian law regarding child labour which is forbidden in Belgium.

In 2000, she became the female vocalist for the dance music group Liquid feat.; later in 2001 the group's name was changed to Sylver. Alongside the successes with Sylver, she also had a solo career. In 2001, she worked with MNC, with whom she covered the Eurythmics song "Sweet Dreams (Are Made of This)".

She also worked with the group Milk Inc. (her friend is singer Linda Mertens). In 2004, the single "I Don't Care" reached the Belgian top ten. In 2007, she collaborated for the single "Time" along with 4 Clubbers in Belgium. She wrote the song "Lovesong" from the Crossroads album.

In 2016 she came back to be the female vocalist for the dance music group Sylver.

== Discography ==
Singles as Silvy Melody

- 1990: "Ben" (Michael Jackson cover)
- 1990: "De telefoon huilt mee" with Danny Fabry (cover of "Le téléphone pleure" by Claude François)
- 1990: "Waar ben je nu"
- 1990: "Hela Sascha"
- 1991: "Alle dagen dansen"
- 1991: "Nummer één"
- 1991: "Hey, hey Sprinklie" with The Sprinklie-Band
- 1992: "Liefde is …"
- 1993: "Daar zijn vrienden voor" with Patrick Van Assche
- 1993: "Hij is zo lief" (cover of "Everlasting Love" by Love Affair)
- 1994: "Wie is zij"

Singles with Lace

- 1998: "Find Me an Angel"

Singles with Sylver

- 2000: "Turn the Tide"
- 2001: "Skin"
- 2001: "Forever in Love"
- 2001: "In Your Eyes" (double A-side single in Germany, Austria and Switzerland with Skin)
- 2001: "Forgiven"
- 2003: "Livin' My Life"
- 2003: "Why Worry"
- 2003: "Shallow Water" / "Confused"
- 2003: "Wild Horses"
- 2004: "Love Is An Angel"
- 2005: "Make it"
- 2005: "Take Me Back"
- 2006: "Half as much"
- 2006: "Lay All Your Love on Me"
- 2006: "One Night Stand"
- 2006: "Why"
- 2007: "The One" (Download only)
- 2008: "One World One Dream"
- 2008: "Rise Again"
- 2009: "I Hate You Now"
- 2009: "Foreign Affair"
- 2009: "Music" (with John Miles)
- 2010: "It's My Life"
- 2010: "Turn the Tide 2010"
- 2011: "Stop Feeling Sorry"
- 2012: "City of Angels"
- 2017: "Turn Your Love Around"
- 2019: "I Won't Wait"
- 2020: "Losing My Religion"
- 2022: "Finally Here"
- 2023: "Turn The Tide Revised (with Lowriderz)"
- 2023: "Holdin' On"

Singles with MNC

- 2001: "Sweet Dreams (Are Made of This)" (Eurythmics cover)

Singles with Milk Inc.

- 2004: "I Don't Care"

Singles with 4 Clubbers

- 2007: "Time"

Singles as Sil

- 2009: "Love Don't Come Easy"
- 2011: "Selfish"
- 2012: "Without You" (feat. David Latour)
- 2013: "Straight Up (Paula Abdul cover)
- 2014: "What's the Time in Tokyo?"

Albums with Sylver

- 2000: Chances
- 2003: Little Things
- 2004: Nighttime Calls
- 2006: Crossroads
- 2007: Best Of – The Hit Collection 2001–2007
- 2009: Sacrifice
- 2010: Decade – The Very Best of Sylver
