= Foreign Affair (Mike Oldfield song) =

1983 song by Mike Oldfield

Song by Mike Oldfield

from the album Crises
- Released: 27 May 1983
- Recorded: November 1982 – April 1983
- Genre: Pop
- Length: 3:52
- Label: Virgin
- Songwriters: Maggie Reilly; Mike Oldfield
- Producers: Mike Oldfield; Simon Phillips

Crises track listing
- 6 tracks: 1. "Crises"; 2. "Moonlight Shadow"; 3. "In High Places"; 4. "Foreign Affair"; 5. "Taurus 3"; 6. "Shadow on the Wall"

"Foreign Affair" is a song written by Maggie Reilly and Mike Oldfield, which first appeared on Oldfield's 1983 album Crises on Virgin Records.

The song was originally recorded during the Crises sessions between November 1982 and April 1983 at Oldfield's studio in Denham, Buckinghamshire. On "Foreign Affair", Oldfield plays a Fairlight CMI and Roland strings. Maggie Reilly provides vocals, and the co-producer Simon Phillips plays Tama Drums and a shaker.

Oldfield performed the song on tour extensively in the 1980s. The song has since been featured on compilations such as The Platinum Collection, Collection, Elements Boxset and Elements – The Best of Mike Oldfield.

== Sylver cover ==
"Foreign Affair"

Single by Sylver

from the album Sacrifice
- Released: 12 June 2009
- Length: 3:14
- Label: Universal
- Songwriters: Maggie Reilly; Mike Oldfield
- Producers: Regi Penxten; Wout Van Dessel

Sylver singles chronology
"I Hate You Now" (2009)	"Foreign Affair" (2009)	"Music" (2009)

Music video
- "Foreign Affair" on YouTube

In 2009 the Belgian group Sylver covered "Foreign Affair" on their fifth album, Sacrifice. The song reached number three on the Belgian Singles Chart. The song was released in Germany on 20 November 2009, but only as a download.

=== Track listing ===
1. "Foreign Affair" (Radio Edit) – 3:14
2. "Foreign Affair" (Album Version) – 6:26
3. "Foreign Affair" (Hardwell Remix) – 7:06
4. "Foreign Affair" (Cliff Coenraad Repimp) – 7:23

=== Charts ===
Chart (2009)	Peak position
Belgium (Ultratop 50 Flanders)	3
Belgium (Ultratip Bubbling Under Wallonia)	21
Germany (GfK)	77
