= Forgiven (Sylver song) =

Single by Sylver

from the album Chances
- Released: 5 October 2001
- Genre: Trance, Europop
- Length: 3:25
- Label: Byte Records
- Songwriter(s): Regi Penxten; Wout Van Dessel
- Producer(s): Wout Van Dessel; Regi Penxten

Sylver singles chronology
"In Your Eyes" (2001)	"Forgiven" (2001)	"Livin' My Life" (2002)

"Forgiven" is a song recorded by Belgian vocal trance and Europop group Sylver. It was released in October 2001 as the fifth and final single from their debut album, Chances. It reached the top 10 in Belgium and Romania.

== Track listing ==
1. "Forgiven" (Radio Edit Remixed) – 3:25
2. "Forgiven" (Oliver Lieb Mix) – 8:28
3. "Forgiven" (Club Caviar Mix) – 6:11
4. "Forgiven" (Extended Mix) – 5:14

== Charts ==
Chart (2001–2002)	Peak position
Austria (Ö3 Austria Top 75)	52
Belgium (Ultratop 50 Flanders)	9
Germany (Media Control Charts)	25
Netherlands (Dutch Top 40)	35
Romania (Romanian Top 100)	5
Spain (PROMUSICAE)	16
Switzerland (Schweizer Hitparade)	88
