= Forever in Love =

Forever in Love may refer to:

- "Forever in Love" (instrumental), an instrumental song by saxophone player Kenny G, 1993
- "Forever in Love" (Shirley Myers song), a song by Shirley Myers and Duane Steele, 1999
- "Forever in Love" (Sylver song), a song by Sylver, 2001
- "Forever in Love", a song by Pet Shop Boys, present on multiple expanded releases of Very (Pet Shop Boys album)
- "Forever in Love", a song by A1 from Here We Come
- Forever in Love, UK release title of film Pride of the Marines, 1945
