= Everytime We Touch =

Everytime We Touch may refer to:

- Everytime We Touch (album), by Cascada
  - "Everytime We Touch" (Cascada song), a single from the aforementioned Cascada album
- "Everytime We Touch" (Maggie Reilly song), a song by singer Maggie Reilly from her 1992 album Echoes
- "Everytime We Touch" (David Guetta song), the third single from French DJ David Guetta's 2007 album Pop Life
