= Tears in the Rain (disambiguation) =

Tears in the Rain is a 1988 television movie.

Tears in the Rain may also refer to:

- "Tears in the Rain" (Maggie Reilly song), 1992
- "Tears in the Rain" (Robin Beck song), 1989
- Tears in rain monologue, a monologue delivered in the 1982 film Blade Runner
- "Tears in the Rain", an instrumental rock composition from the Joe Santriani album The Extremist
- "Tears in the Rain", an R&B song from The Weeknd album Kiss Land
- "Tears in the Rain", a single by British Eurodance group N-Trance
- "Tears in the Rain", a country song from the Tim McGraw album Tim McGraw
- "Tears in the Rain", a hard rock song from the Triumph album Classics
