= Turn the Tide (Sylver song) =

2000 single by Sylver

Single by Sylver

from the album Chances
- Released: 15 June 2000
- Genre: Trance
- Length: 8:01
- Label: Byte
- Songwriter: Wout Van Dessel
- Producers: Regi Penxten, Wout Van Dessel

Sylver singles chronology
"Turn the Tide" (2000)	"Skin" (2001)

"Turn the Tide" is a song by Belgian vocal trance and Europop group Sylver, released as their debut single. The song was produced in Belgium by Little Major Productions. In Belgium, it was released under the artist name Liquid featuring Silvy. The song is included on the group's debut album Chances and in French as "Je ne sais pas" as part of their second album Little Things as a ghost track at the end of the album.

== Track listing ==
1. "Turn the Tide" (radio edit) (4:06)
2. "Turn the Tide" (CJ Stone radio edit) (3:28)
3. "Turn the Tide" (the original mix) (8:01)
4. "Turn the Tide" (Airscape remix) (7:25)
5. "Turn the Tide" (CJ Stone remix) (7:34)

== Credits ==
- Artwork – VM2 DTP
- Photography – Maak Roberts
- Songwriter – Wout Van Dessel
- producer – Regi Penxten
- Vocals – Silvy De Bie

== Charts ==
=== Weekly charts ===
Chart (2000–2002)	Peak position
Austria (Ö3 Austria Top 40)	3
Belgium (Ultratop 50 Flanders) as Liquid feat. Silvy	1
Germany (GfK)	2
Netherlands (Dutch Top 40)	15
Netherlands (Single Top 100) as Liquid feat. Silvy	50
Netherlands (Single Top 100)	15
Romania (Romanian Top 100)	5
Scottish Singles Sales (Official Charts)	40
Spain (Promusicae)	16
Switzerland (Schweizer Hitparade)	44
UK Singles (Official Charts)	56
UK Dance (Official Charts)	6

=== Year-end charts ===
Chart (2000)	Position
Belgium (Ultratop 50 Flanders)	7

Chart (2001)	Position
Austria (Ö3 Austria Top 40)	38
Germany (Media Control)	15
Netherlands (Dutch Top 40)	85
Netherlands (Single Top 100)	83

== Certifications ==
Region	Certification	Certified units/sales
Belgium (BRMA)	Gold	25,000^{*}
Germany (BVMI)	Gold	250,000^{^}
^{*} Sales figures based on certification alone.^{^} Shipments figures based on certification alone.
