= Nighttime Calls =

Studio album by Sylver
- Released: 25 October 2004
- Genre: Europop; Trance
- Label: Zeitgeist
- Producer: Regi Penxten, Wout Van Dessel

Sylver chronology
Little Things (2003)	Nighttime Calls (2004)	Crossroads (2006)

Singles from Nighttime Calls
- 1. "Love Is an Angel" Released: 2004; 2. "Make it" Released: 25 April 2005; 3. "Take Me Back" Released: September 2005

Nighttime Calls is Sylver's third studio album, released on 25 October 2004 in Europe. The title 'Nighttime Calls' refers to the long, drawn out late-night telephone conversations that were made by Sylver when they are discussing the musical content and new songs that were to appear on the album.

Track listing

1. Love Is an Angel (3:21)
2. Take Me Back (3:20)
3. Summer Solstice (5:23)
4. Who Am I (3:44)
5. Make It (3:13)
6. Drowning in My Tears (3:59)
7. Sympathy (2:51)
8. Changed (3:40)
9. Where Did the Love Go (3:37)
10. Fallin' (2:56)
11. Tomorrow (3:31)
12. Don't Call Me (2:58)
13. Where Did I Go Wrong (3:02)
14. Sometimes (3:35)

== Charts ==
Chart (2004)	Peak position
Belgian Albums Chart	23
German Albums Chart	41

== Release history ==
Region	Date	Label	Catalog No.
Germany	25 October 2004	Zeitgeist	986 870-9
Belgium	28 October 2004	Byte Records	BY 0504100-2
Poland	8 November 2004	Magic Records	986870-9
Russia	2004	RMG Records	1345-2
Russia	2004	ToCo International	122.670-2
Singapore	2005	EQ Music	EA 70700
United States	25 July 2006	Toucan Cove/Universal	B0007121-02
