= Linda Mertens =

Belgian singer (born 1978)

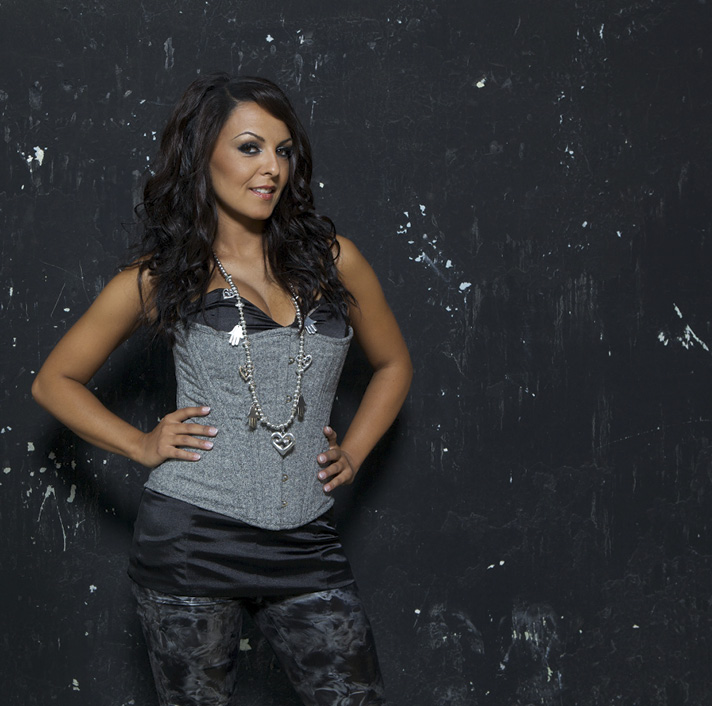

Background information
- Born: 20 July 1978 (age 48); Wilrijk, Belgium
- Occupation: Singer
- Website: www.lindamertens.be

Linda Mertens (born 20 July 1978) is a Belgian singer. She is the female singer for the group Milk Inc.

Mertens was born in Wilrijk in Antwerp. She studied art and after high school, she went to hairdresser school for two years. Her father is Flemish, and her mother Tunisian. In 2013 she appeared on VTM in Lang Leve... as herself, in an episode about Regi Penxten, a member of Milk Inc.

== Discography ==
=== Albums with Milk Inc. ===
- 2000: Land of the Living
- 2001: Double Cream
- 2002: Milk Inc.
- 2003: Closer
- 2004: Best of Milk Inc.
- 2005: Closer (USA)
- 2006: Milk Inc. Essential
- 2006: Supersized
- 2006: Supersized XL
- 2007: Best Of
- 2008: Forever
- 2011: Nomansland
- 2011: 15 – The Very Best Of
- 2013: Undercover

=== Singles with Milk Inc. ===
- 2000: "Land of the Living"
- 2001: "Livin' a Lie"
- 2001: "Don't Cry"
- 2001: "Never Again"
- 2001: "Wide Awake"
- 2002: "Sleepwalker"
- 2002: "Breathe Without You"
- 2003: "Time"
- 2003: "The Sun Always Shines on TV"
- 2004: "I Don't Care" (with Silvy de Bie)
- 2004: "Whisper"
- 2005: "Blind"
- 2005: "Go to Hell"
- 2006: "Tainted Love"
- 2006: "Run"
- 2006: "No Angel"
- 2007: "Sunrise"
- 2007: "Tonight"
- 2008: "Forever"
- 2008: "Race"
- 2009: "Blackout"
- 2010: "Storm"
- 2010: "Chasing the Wind"
- 2011: "Fire"
- 2011: "Shadow"
- 2011: "I'll Be There (La Vache 2011)"
- 2012: "Miracle"
- 2013: "Last Night a DJ Saved My Life"
- 2013: "La Vache 2013"
- 2013: "Sweet Child O'Mine"
- 2013: "Imagination"
- 2014: "Don't Say Goodbye"
- 2025: “Unstoppable”
- 2026: “Medicine”

=== Singles with Jessy ===
- 2007: "Getting Out"

=== Singles with Esther Sels, Kate Ryan, Maaike Moens (The Quest) and Pascale Feront (Absolom) ===
- 2001: "Oh Baby I"

=== As guest with Sylver ===
- 2006: "Keep Your Hands"
