= Lang Leve... =

Flemish television program

- Genre: Comedy show
- Presented by: Jonas Van Geel
- Country of origin: Belgium
- Original language: Dutch
- No. of seasons: 2
- No. of episodes: 22

Original release
- Network: VTM
- Release: 3 September 2013 – 4 November 2014

Lang Leve... ("Long Live...") is a comical Flemish television program presented in Belgium on vtm by Jonas van Geel. In each episode, a celebrity guest takes his or her place in the "throne" and is roasted by van Geel using a series of acted vignettes about the celebrity's life.

Next to the 18 regular episodes, there were 4 compilation episodes.

== Episodes ==
Episodes
Season 1
| Year | Number | Name of episode | Celebrity | Date | Actors in sketches |
|---|---|---|---|---|---|
| 2013 | 1 | Lang Leve Natalia | Natalia Druyts | 3 September | Nathalie Meskens as Natalia |
| 2013 | 2 | Lang Leve Bart | Bart de Pauw | 10 September | |
| 2013 | 3 | Lang Leve Koen | Koen Wauters | 17 September | |
| 2013 | 4 | Lang Leve Regi | Regi Penxten | 24 September | Jonas Van Geel as Regi, Karen Damen as Linda Mertens |
| 2013 | 5 | Lang Leve Gert | Gert Verhulst | 1 October | |
| 2013 | 6 | Lang Leve Christoff | Christoff De Bolle | 8 October | |
| 2013 | 7 | Lang Leve Urbanus | Urbain Joseph Servranckx | 15 October | |
| 2013 | 8 | Lang Leve Jacques | Jacques Vermeire | 22 October | |
| 2013 | 9 | Lang Leve Bart | Bart Peeters | 29 October | |
| 2013 | 10 | Lang Leve Tom | Tom Waes | 5 November | |
Season 2
| 2014 | 1 | Lang Leve Astrid | Astrid Bryan | 2 September | |
| 2014 | 2 | Lang Leve Jan | Jan Leyers | 9 September | |
| 2014 | 3 | Lang Leve De Romeo's | De Romeo's | 16 September | |
| 2014 | 4 | Lang Leve Nicole & Hugo | Nicole & Hugo | 23 September | |
| 2014 | 5 | Lang Leve Marco | Marco Borsato | 30 September | |
| 2014 | 6 | Lang Leve Erik | Erik Van Looy | 7 October | |
| 2014 | 7 | Lang Leve Nathalie | Nathalie Meskens | 14 October | |
| 2014 | 8 | Lang Leve Mike (25 Years of VTM) | Mike Verdrengh | 7 October | |
