= Nailpin =

Belgian band

Nailpin is a Belgian band.

== History ==
After Belgian singles "Endless Conversations", "Movin' On" and "Together", from their debut album '12 TO GO' which was released in May 2004, Nailpin made their international debut.

Their performance at the 2004 TMF awards caused Avril Lavigne to ask them to open for her on her Japan tour.

At the end of September 2005, the band took part in MTV's Road Rally, in which they had to cross the USA from West coast to East Coast, earning their way and scoring shows. After starting in Los Angeles they ended up just beating Dutch competitor Di-rect in New York. The series was aired from November to January, gathering viewers attention.

The second Nailpin album "White Lies & Butterflies" was released in April 2006, while the band toured Japan for the second time.

They opened for Panic! at the Disco at a show in Tilburg in March 2008.

After releasing the singles "Worn Out", "What Are You Waiting For", "They Don't Know" and "This Coma" from their second album White Lies And Butterflies, Nailpin released a new record called III and the single The Ending in April 2008. The video for The Ending features the band being chased as bunnies by hunters. Nailpin announced a new single from the album to be released in the summer of 2008. On 13 May it was announced that the single would be "It's Allright" and that the video will feature cars. The third single from the album III was The Quiet Shutdown. It was released in October/November 2008.

Bon Jovi asked Nailpin to play at their concert in the Koning Boudewijnstadion on 14 June 2008. Nailpin toured in 2009 in Germany, Austria, Switzerland and the Netherlands.

In October 2009, Nailpin announced that they would take a break for an undetermined period. Their last show was in December 2009.

== Personnel ==
- Sean Dhondt, Drummer and Lead Vocals (drummer, became singer after Niko left the band at the end of February 2006)
- Shaun Van Steen, Guitar and Backing Vocals
- Todts, Bass, Backing Vocals
- Dave Colman, Guitar
- Corné, Drummer (Live shows only)
- Niko, Lead Vocals (Left the band at the end of February 2006)
