= Cado Belle =

Scottish rock band

- Origin: Scotland
- Genres: Pub rock, jazz rock
- Years active: 1974–1979
- Label: Anchor Records
- Members: Maggie Reilly; Alan Darby; Gavin Hodgson; Stuart MacKillop; Davy Roy; Colin Tully

Cado Belle were a Scottish rock group prominent in the pub rock scene of the mid-1970s, and are notable for making the first recordings featuring singer Maggie Reilly who went on to have success with Mike Oldfield and as a solo artist. Band member Colin Tully achieved some fame with the soundtrack of the critically acclaimed film Gregory's Girl. Their genre has also been described as Scottish soul.

== Origins ==
In Glasgow, singer Maggie Reilly met Stuart MacKillop who asked her to join his band Joe Cool. In October 1974 the band merged with another called Up, forming Cado Belle. They issued their only, self-titled album in autumn 1976. The lyrics to almost all of these songs were provided by Alasdair Robertson a friend and former flat mate of band member Alan Darby. It was followed a year later by an EP. They continued to gig in 1978 but dissolved the following year.

== Line-up ==
- Maggie Reilly: Vocals, backing vocals
- Alan Darby: Guitars
- Gavin Hodgson: Bass
- Stuart MacKillop: Keyboards
- Davy Roy: Drums, percussion
- Colin Tully: Saxophone, flute, horn arrangements

== Recordings ==
Their only LP, titled simply Cado Belle, was released in 1976 on the Anchor Records label. The track listing is as follows:

1. "All Too Familiar" 3:09 (Stuart MacKillop / Alasdair Robertson)
2. "Infamous Mister" 3:49 (Stuart MacKillop / Alasdair Robertson)
3. "Rocked to Stony Silence" 5:26 (Colin Tully / Alasdair Robertson)
4. "I Name This Ship Survival" 4:31 (Colin Tully / Alasdair Robertson)
5. "Paper in the Rain" 3:55 (Stuart MacKillop / Alasdair Robertson)
6. "That Kind of Fool" 3:52 (Stuart MacKillop / Alasdair Robertson)
7. "Airport Shutdown" 3:39 (Colin Tully / Alasdair Robertson)
8. "Rough Diamonds” 4:49 (Stuart MacKillop / Alasdair Robertson)
9. "Got to Love" 2:45 (Stuart MacKillop)
10. "Stone's Throw from Nowhere" 4:55 (Colin Tully / Alasdair Robertson)

Mel Collins, Frank Collins and Paddie McHugh from the band Kokomo guested on the album.

In 1977, they recorded the Cado Belle EP, containing the following tracks:

1. "It's Over" (Boz Scaggs/David Paich)
2. "September" (Alan Darby)
3. "Play It Once for Me" (Stuart MacKillop)
4. "Gimme Little Sign" (Alfred Smith/Joe Hooven/Hal Winn)

A CD containing all fourteen tracks from the album and the EP was released by Mirror Image Records in 2008.

In 2023 a non-physical release of live BBC recordings was made available on iTunes (and other equivalent platforms) for download. Tracks 1 through 5 and 16 thru 19 are from BBC Radio 1 programmes introduced by Bob Harris, John Peel and Pete Drummond, mostly from 1976. Tracks 6 thru 15 are from a TV programme Rock Goes to College in 1978 with a later line-up of the band.

The track listing is as follows:

1. Still Running (6.22)
2. That Kind Of Fool (4.27)
3. Got To Love (3.58)
4. Dill (10.22)
5. Stones Throw From Nowhere (4.18)
6. Thief in the night (4.52)
7. Aint No Doubt (4.15)
8. All I need is you (4.34)
9. Moonbeam (4.05)
10. Hole in the head (5.13)
11. Living on the break (4.09)
12. Always (4.18)
13. Fallen angel (5.34)
14. Play it once for me (2.54)
15. Midnight believer (5.42)
16. Rough Diamonds (4.46)
17. Got To Love (2.44)
18. Stones Throw From Nowhere (4.23)
19. Still Running (8.12)
