= Katerine =

- Gender: Female

Katerine is a surname or given name, and may refer to:

== Given name ==
- Katerine Avgoustakis (born 1983), winner of the 2005 Star Academy show in Belgium
- Katerine Duska (born 1989), Canadian-Greek singer and songwriter
- Katerine Montealegre (born 1993), Chilean lawyer
- Katerine Moreno (born 1974), Bolivian swimmer
- Katerine Savard (born 1993), Canadian competitive swimmer

== Surname ==
- Philippe Katerine (born 1968), French singer
