= Maggie Reilly =

Scottish singer (born 1956)

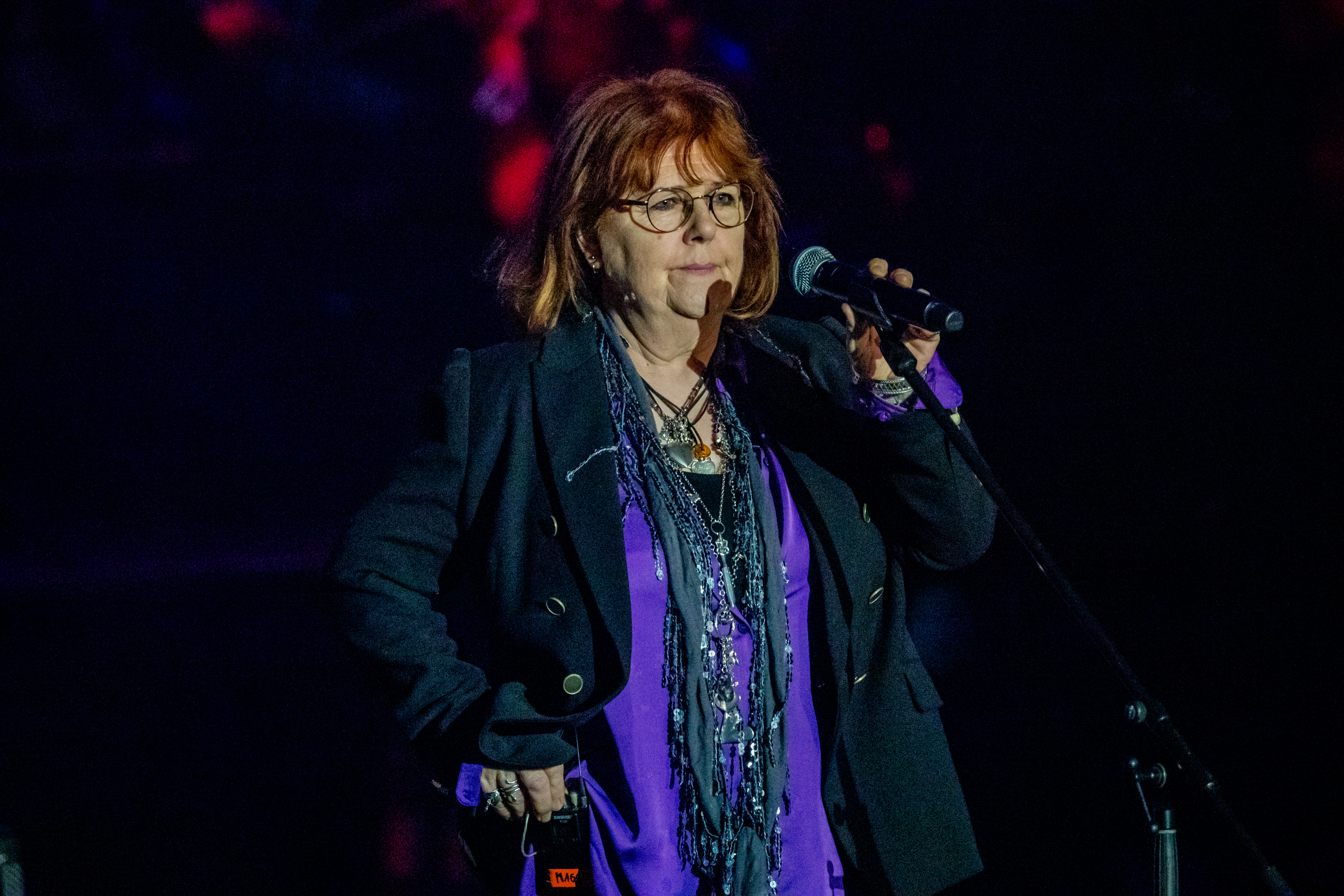
- Reilly in 2023

Background information
- Born: 15 September 1956 (age 70); Maryhill, Glasgow, Scotland
- Genres: Pop; folk; soft rock
- Years active: 1970s–present
- Labels: EMI; Red Berry
- Website: maggie-reilly.net

Maggie Reilly (born 15 September 1956) is a Scottish singer and songwriter. She performed lead vocals on the Mike Oldfield songs "Family Man", "Moonlight Shadow", "To France", and "Foreign Affair", all of which were international hits in the early 1980s.

== Career ==
Reilly first came to prominence as a member of the 1970s soul outfit Cado Belle (previously named Joe Cool) and released one album with them in 1976.

She collaborated with the composer Mike Oldfield between 1980 and 1984, especially by performing the vocals on "Family Man" (co-written by Reilly; from the album Five Miles Out), "Moonlight Shadow", "Foreign Affair" (co-written by Reilly; from the album Crises) and "To France" (from the album Discovery).

In 1992 Reilly released her debut solo album Echoes, from which the singles "Everytime We Touch", "Tears in the Rain" and "Wait" were the most successful. A series of solo albums were released over the next 27 years.

She has also worked with Mike Batt (on his Hunting of the Snark album), Jack Bruce, Dave Greenfield & Jean-Jacques Burnel, Nick Mason & Rick Fenn, Michael Cretu, Lesiëm, Ralph McTell, Simon Nicol of Fairport Convention, Stefan Zauner of Münchener Freiheit, Runrig, Taco Ockerse, The Sisters of Mercy, and Smokie. "Moonlight Shadow 2k14" (Michael Fall remix) was released on 23 May 2014 on the German label ZYX Music.

== Awards and nominations ==
Year	Awards	Work	Category	Result	Ref.
1993	RSH Gold Awards	Herself	Best Artist with German producer	Won	
1993	Danish Music Awards	Herself	Best International Female	Nominated	
2006	BMI London Awards	"Everytime We Touch"	Dance Award	Won	
2007	BMI London Awards	"Everytime We Touch"	Pop Award	Won	

== Discography ==
=== Studio albums ===
- Echoes (1992)
- Midnight Sun (1993)
- Elena (1996)
- Starcrossed (2000)
- Save It for a Rainy Day (2002)
- Rowan (2006)
- Looking Back, Moving Forward (2009)
- Heaven Sent (2013)
- Starfields (2019)
- Happy Christmas (2022)
- Elfinguard (2024) (with Stuart MacKillop)

=== Compilation albums ===
- All the Mixes (1996) (as ṀṘ)
- The Best of Maggie Reilly, There and Back Again (1998)
- The Best of Maggie Reilly: Past – Present – Future (2021)

=== Solo singles ===
Year	Title	Peak positions								Album
Year	Title	UK	AUT	BEL (FL)	GER	NED	NOR	SWE	SWI	Album
1969	"Imagine Me"	—	—	—	—	—	—	—	—	Non-album singles
1984	"As Tears Go By"	—	—	—	—	—	—	—	—	Non-album singles
1991	"What About Tomorrows Children"	—	—	—	—	30	—	—	—	Echoes
1992	"Everytime We Touch"	99	5	47	16	63	1	34	24	Echoes
1992	"Wait"	—	23	—	54	—	—	—	28	Echoes
1992	"Tears in the Rain"	—	—	—	56	—	—	—	—	Echoes
1993	"Follow the Midnight Sun"	—	—	—	56	—	—	—	—	Midnight Sun
1993	"Every Single Heartbeat"	—	—	—	57	—	—	—	—	Midnight Sun
1994	"Don't Wanna Lose"	—	—	—	—	—	—	—	—	Midnight Sun
1996	"Walk on By"	—	—	—	—	—	—	—	—	Elena
1996	"Listen to Your Heart"	—	—	—	—	—	—	—	—	Elena
1996	"Walk on By (The Mixes)" (as M.R.)	—	—	—	—	—	—	—	—	All The Mixes
1997	"To France (The Mixes)" (as M.R.)	—	17	—	19	53	—	—	22	All The Mixes
1997	"Listen to Your Heart (The Mixes)" (as M.R.)	—	38	—	44	—	—	—	44	All The Mixes
1998	"One Little Word"	—	—	—	—	—	—	—	—	The Best of Maggie Reilly – There and Back Again
2000	"Always You"	—	—	—	—	—	—	—	—	Starcrossed
2000	"Adelena"	—	—	—	—	—	—	—	—	Starcrossed
2002	"Save It for a Rainy Day"	—	—	—	—	—	—	—	—	Save It for a Rainy Day
2012	"My Angel" (with Nu Frequency)	—	—	—	—	—	—	—	—	Connected Remixes (Nu Frequency album)
2013	"Juliette"	—	—	—	—	—	—	—	—	Heaven Sent
2013	"Cold the Snow Clad Mountain"	—	—	—	—	—	—	—	—	Heaven Sent
2013	"Where the Heart Lies" (with Bryan Rice)	—	—	—	—	—	—	—	—	Non-album singles
2015	"Everytime We Touch" (remastered)	—	—	—	—	—	—	—	—	Non-album singles
"—" denotes releases that did not chart or were not released.

=== Collaborations with Mike Oldfield ===
- QE2 (1980)
- Five Miles Out (1982)
- Crises (1983)
- Discovery (1984)
- The Complete (1985)
- Earth Moving (1989)
- Elements – The Best of Mike Oldfield (1993)
- XXV: The Essential (1997)

=== Collaborations with other artists ===
- Cado Belle – Cado Belle (1976)
- Jim Wilkie – The Waxer (1979)
- Pumphouse Gang - Welcome Back Into My Life (1979)
- Doll by Doll – Grand Passion (1982)
- Dave Greenfield & J.J. Burnel – Fire & Water (1983)
- Peter Blegvad – Naked Shakespeare (1983)
- Nick Mason & Rick Fenn – Profiles (1985)
- Flairck – Sleight of Hand (1986)
- Mike Batt – The Hunting of the Snark (1986)
- Jack Bruce – Willpower (1989)
- The Sisters of Mercy – Vision Thing (1990)
- Jack Bruce – Somethin' Else (1992)
- Jack Bruce – Cities of the Heart (1993)
- The Lenny MacDowell Project – Lost Paradise (1993)
- Artists for Nature – Earthrise: The Rainforest Album (1994)
- Colm Wilkinson – Stage Heroes (1994)
- Juliane Werding – Du schaffst es (1994)
- Juliane Werding and Viktor Lazlo – Engel wie du (1994)
- Jack Bruce – The Collectors Edition (1996)
- Jack Bruce – Sitting on Top of the World (1997)
- Simon Nicol – Before Your Time / Consonant Please Carol (1998)
- Smokie – Wild Horses – The Nashville Album (1998)
- Smokie – Our Swedish Collection (1999)
- Lesiëm – Times (2003) / Auracle (2004)
- XII Alfonso – Charles Darwin (2012)
- Taco Ockerse – Heaven Sent (2024)
