= Forever in Love (Sylver song) =

Single by Sylver

from the album Chances
- Released: 6 April 2001
- Genre: Trance
- Length: 2:43
- Label: Byte Records
- Songwriter(s): Regi Penxten; Wout Van Dessel
- Producer(s): Wout Van Dessel; Regi Penxten

Sylver singles chronology
"Skin" (2001)	"Forever in Love" (2001)	"In Your Eyes" (2001)

"Forever in Love" is a song recorded by Belgian vocal trance and europop group Sylver. It was released in April 2001 as the third single from their debut album, Chances, reaching the top 10 in Germany and Romania.

== Track listing ==
1. "Forever In Love" (radio edit) – 2:43
2. "Forever In Love" (Green Court radio edit) – 3:40
3. "Forever In Love" (Green Court remix) – 7:47
4. "Forever In Love" (original mix) – 4:16
5. "Forever In Love" (3 Drives club mix) – 7:05

== Charts ==
=== Weekly charts ===
Chart (2001)	Peak position
Austria (Ö3 Austria Top 40)	27
Belgium (Ultratop 50 Flanders)	11
Germany (GfK)	10
Netherlands (Single Top 100)	65
Romania (Romanian Top 100)	5
Spain (PROMUSICAE)	17
Switzerland (Schweizer Hitparade)	79

=== Year-end charts ===
Chart (2001)	Position
Belgium (Ultratop 50 Flanders)	80
Germany (Media Control)	97
