= What About Tomorrows Children =

Single by Maggie Reilly

from the album Echoes
- B-side: "Nowhere to Hide"
- Released: 1991
- Recorded: 1991
- Genre: Pop
- Length: 4:12
- Label: Empire Records
- Songwriter(s): Briggs, Seibold, Touchton
- Producer(s): Harald Steinhauer, Kristian Schultze

Maggie Reilly singles chronology
"As Tears Go By" (1984)	"What About Tomorrows Children" (1991)	"Everytime We Touch" (1992)

"What About Tomorrows Children" is a pop song by Scottish singer Maggie Reilly. It was released by Empire Records as the first single from her debut studio album Echoes (1992). The song was produced by Harald Steinhauer and Kristian Schultze. The single peaked at number thirty on Dutch Singles Chart.

== Formats and track listings ==
CD / 7" Single

1. "What About Tomorrows Children" – 4:13
2. "Nowhere to Hide" – 5:00

== Charts ==
Chart (1991)	Peak position
Dutch Singles Chart	30
