= Sacrifice (Sylver album) =

Studio album by Sylver
- Released: 12 May 2009
- Genre: Eurodance, Trance, Pop
- Length: 61:47
- Label: ARS/Universal Music
- Producer: Regi Penxten, Wout Van Dessel

Sylver chronology
2001-2007 - The Hit Collection (2007)	Sacrifice (2009)

Singles from Sacrifice
- 1. "One World One Dream" Released: June 23, 2008; 2. "Rise Again" Released: October 27, 2008; 3. "I Hate You Now" Released: March 2, 2009; 4. "Foreign Affair" Released: June 12, 2009

Sacrifice is Sylver's fifth studio album, released on 12 May 2009 in Belgium. The working title was 'Resurrection', in the end Sylver decided to name the album 'Sacrifice'. Guitarist John Miles Jr. (son of John Miles) is also on the album cover, who joined the band a short while before.

The album was also the recipient of the Best Album award on the former television broadcast TMF Awards.

== Track listing ==
No.	Title	Length
1.	"I Hate You Now"	3:03
2.	"Sacrifice Me"	3:23
3.	"Easy Way Out"	4:20
4.	"One of Us"	3:18
5.	"God's Mistake"	3:14
6.	"Rise Again"	3:49
7.	"Foreign Affair"	6:24
8.	"Time Won't Wait"	3:14
9.	"It Takes Two"	3:33
10.	"Hungry Heart"	3:02
11.	"Typical Guy"	4:16
12.	"How Could I Be So Wrong"	4:53
13.	"Too Much Love"	3:15
14.	"Music" (featuring John Miles)	5:20
15.	"One World, One Dream"	3:10
16.	"Thank You"	3:33
Total length:		61:47

== Singles ==
- "One World One Dream" was released as the first single from the album. It was also used as the theme for the Olympics 2008. It charted at #21 in Belgium.
- "Rise Again" was chosen as the second single from the album at the end of 2008. The single also charted at #21 in Belgium
- "I Hate You Now" was released as the third single in March 2009 before the album was released. It became a success for Sylver and it charted at #8 in Belgium
- "Foreign Affair" has been released on 12 June 2009, as the fourth single from the album. It proved to be the most successful single from the album, which is unusual for a fourth single, and it charted at #3 in Belgium. Their highest chart position there since "Skin" in 2001 charted at #2.
- "Music" was released as the fifth single from the album in November 2009. It is a duet with John Miles. It has so far charted at #11 at the Belgian ultratop50.

== Charts ==
Chart (2009)	Peak position
Belgium	3
