= Wait (Maggie Reilly song) =

Single by Maggie Reilly

from the album Echoes
- B-side: "You'll Never Lose"
- Released: 1992
- Recorded: 1991
- Genre: Pop
- Length: 4:22 (Album Version); 3:51 (Radio Edit)
- Label: EMI
- Songwriter(s): Gavin Hodgson; Maggie Reilly; Stuart MacKillop; A. Seibold
- Producer(s): Armand Volker, Stefan Zauner

Maggie Reilly singles chronology
"Everytime We Touch" (1992)	"Wait" (1992)	"Tears in the Rain" (1992)

"Wait" is a Pop song by Scottish singer Maggie Reilly. It was released in 1992 as the album's third single. The song was written by Gavin Hodgson, Maggie Reilly, Stuart MacKillop and A. Seibold and produced by Armand Volker and Stefan Zauner. The single's B-side was written by Stefan Zauner and also appeared on the album.

== Formats and track listings ==
CD Single

1. "Wait" (Radio Edit) – 3:51
2. "Wait" (Special Radio Edit) – 2:43
3. "You'll Never Lose" – 3:29

== Charts ==
Chart (1992)	Peak position
Austrian Singles Chart	23
Swiss Singles Chart	29
