= Echoes (Maggie Reilly album) =

Studio album by Maggie Reilly
- Released: 30 April 1992
- Recorded: 1991–1992
- Genres: Pop; folk
- Length: 49:05
- Label: EMI
- Producers: Armand Volker; Harald Steinhauer; Kristian Schultze; Stefan Zauner

Maggie Reilly chronology
Echoes (1992)	Midnight Sun (1993)

Singles from Echoes
- 1. "What About Tomorrows Children" Released: 1991; 2. "Everytime We Touch" Released: 1992; 3. "Wait" Released: 1992; 4. "Tears in the Rain" Released: 1992

Professional ratings
Review scores
Source	Rating
AllMusic	3/5 stars

Echoes is the debut studio album by Scottish singer Maggie Reilly. It was released on 30 April 1992 by EMI. The album was produced by Armand Volker, Harald Steinhauer, Kristian Schultze and Stefan Zauner. It includes the European hit single "Everytime We Touch". Commercially, the album was a success in multiple countries, topping the charts in Denmark, Finland, and Norway.

== Track listing ==
Echoes track listing
No.	Title	Writer(s)	Length
1.	"Everytime We Touch"	Peter Risavy, Maggie Reilly, Stuart MacKillop	4:04
2.	"Tears in the Rain"	Sabine Bundschu, Alex Grünwald, Reilly	3:44
3.	"Echoes"	MacKillop, Reilly	3:31
4.	"You'll Never Lose"	Reilly, Stefan Zauner	3:29
5.	"Gaia"	MacKillop, Reilly	2:37
6.	"Real World"	Gavin Hodgson, Lothar Krell, George Liszt, MacKillop, Reilly	3:20
7.	"I'm Sorry"	Reilly, Zauner	4:15
8.	"Wait"	Hodgson, MacKillop, Reilly, Andreas Seibold	4:22
9.	"What About Tomorrows Children"	Curtis Briggs, Seibold, Timothy Touchton	4:13
10.	"Only a Fool"	Günther Gebauer, Hodgson, Reilly	3:57
11.	"I Know That I Need You"	Johan Daansen, Reilly	4:15
12.	"Everytime We Touch" (long version)	MacKillop, Reilly, Risavy	7:18
Total length:			49:05

== Personnel ==
- Curt Cress – drums
- Stuart MacKillop – programming
- Maggie Reilly – vocals
- Tim Renwick – guitar
- Kristian Schultze – producer
- Harold Steinhauer – producer
- Armand Volker – arranger, programming, producer, engineer, remixing, mixing
- Peter Weihe – guitar
- Stefan Zauner – arranger, keyboards, programming, producer

== Charts ==
=== Weekly charts ===
Weekly chart performance for Echoes
Chart (1992)	Peak position
Austrian Albums (Ö3 Austria)	12
Danish Albums (IFPI)	1
European Albums (Music & Media)	19
Finnish Albums (Suomen virallinen lista)	1
German Albums (Offizielle Top 100)	32
Greek Albums (Pop & Rock)	2
Norwegian Albums (VG-lista)	1
Swedish Albums (Sverigetopplistan)	19
Swiss Albums (Schweizer Hitparade)	24

=== Year-end charts ===
Year-end chart performance for Echoes
Chart (1992)	Position
European Albums (Music & Media)	58
German Albums (Offizielle Top 100)	95
Swedish Albums (Sverigetopplistan)	91

== Sales and certifications ==
Certifications for Echoes
Region	Certification	Certified units/sales
Finland (Musiikkituottajat)	Platinum	62,325
