= Katerine Montealegre =

Chilean politician

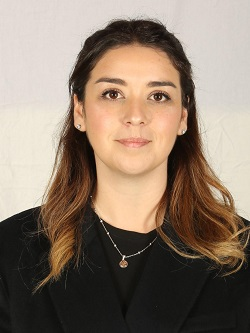

Member of the Constitutional Convention
- In office 4 July 2021 – 4 July 2022
- Constituency: 26th District

Personal details
- Born: 23 February 1992 (age 34) Maullín, Chile
- Party: Independent Democratic Union (UDI)
- Education: Santo Tomás University (LL.B)
- Occupation: Politician
- Profession: Lawyer

Katerine Montealegre Navarro (born 23 February 1992) is a Chilean lawyer who was elected as a member of the Chilean Constitutional Convention.

== Education ==
Montealegre completed her primary studies at the Encarnación Olivares School in Maullín and her secondary education at the Colegio Salesiano Padre José Fernández Pérez in Puerto Montt.

She later studied law at the Santo Tomás University, where she earned her professional title as a lawyer.

== Political career ==
A member of the Independent Democratic Union, she ran as a candidate in the 2021 Chilean Constitutional Convention election as part of the Chile Vamos coalition. She received 5,039 votes - 3.84% of the valid ballots - and entered the Convention through the gender parity mechanism. Within the body, her stated priorities included the protection of fundamental rights such as life, property, and individual liberty, as well as promoting fiscal decentralisation and more efficient use of regional resources.

During the Convention's regulatory phase, Montealegre served on the Ethics Committee. She later joined the thematic Commission on Fundamental Rights, and in May 2022 began serving on the Harmonisation Committee, contributing to the final consolidation of the draft constitutional text.
