= Tears in the Rain (Maggie Reilly song) =

Single by Maggie Reilly

from the album Echoes
- B-side: "Only a Fool"
- Released: 1993
- Recorded: 1992
- Genre: Pop, folk
- Length: 3:44
- Label: EMI
- Songwriter(s): Sabine Bundschu, Alex Grünwald, Reilly
- Producer(s): Armand Volker

Maggie Reilly singles chronology
"Wait" (1992)	"Tears in the Rain" (1993)	"Follow the Midnight Sun" (1994)

Tears in the Rain is a Pop song by Scottish singer Maggie Reilly. The song was produced by Armand Volker and released as the fourth and final single from her debut studio album Echoes (1992). The single's B-side "Only a Fool" also appeared on the album.

== Formats and track listings ==
CD / 7" Single

1. "Tears in the Rain" – 3:44
2. "Only a Fool" – 4:57

== Charts ==
Chart (1992)	Peak position
Austrian Singles Chart	25
Dutch Singles Chart	22
Norwegian Singles Chart	14
