= Sandrine (singer) =

- Born: Sandrine Jennifer Daniels born c. 1979; Blue Mountains, New South Wales, Australia
- Origin: Sydney, New South Wales, Australia
- Genres: Pop; indie
- Occupation: Musician
- Instruments: Vocals; guitar; piano; keyboards
- Years active: 2003–present
- Labels: Sony; Nettwerk
- Website: sandrinesongs.com

Sandrine Jennifer Daniels (born c. 1979, Blue Mountains), who performs as Sandrine, is an Australian indie pop singer-songwriter and musician. She has released three albums, Trigger (November 2003), Dark Fades into the Light (2008) and Circles (2010). Her debut single, "Trigger" (September 2003) reached No. 28 on the ARIA Singles Chart.

== Biography ==
Sandrine Jennifer Daniels was born in about 1979 in the Blue Mountains, 50 kilometres (31 mi) north-west of Sydney. With her parents, two sisters and a brother, she relocated to New Zealand when she was six. Her father was a minister and the whole family performed as a Christian music group, the Cornerstone Family, both for the church's congregation and on tour. Her father provided guitar and vocals, her mother on vocals, one sister on bass guitar, the other sister on piano and her brother on drums; Sandrine played an omnichord – "kind of like an electronic autoharp." She recalled, "We lived in a converted bus, and travelled about New Zealand... doing shows for the faithful. It's funny to look back on. I think I really enjoyed the performing. I remember incidents such as getting chewing gum stuck in my hair before a show, and getting in big trouble."

She had received classical piano lessons as a child and, from the age of 15, was in an advanced music group at school, "I picked up guitar from the boys in the class, because all we really did was sit around and jam." She moved into a caravan in the family's backyard and started working as a waitress. As a singer she joined a covers band, performing "I See Red" (originally by Split Enz) and "Get Back" (the Beatles). Sandrine left New Zealand and moved to Sydney, where she was briefly in a Lynyrd Skynyrd covers band before travelling overseas at 17. She returned to Sydney in her early 20s, "this is where I started to record [my own songs], and start to get things happening."

Sandrine was signed to Sony Music Australia in 2003, and issued her debut single, "Trigger", in September. and peaked at No. 28 on the ARIA Singles Chart. She released her debut studio album, Trigger, in November of that year, all its tracks were co-written by Daniels and Skeet. It reached No. 12 on the ARIA Hitseekers Albums chart. One of its tracks, "Schoolgirl", was used for the soundtrack of a feature film, One Perfect Day (February 2004).

Undercover News' Hector the Rock Dog, described the artist, "Sandrine can sing, she can write and she can perform... This lady is one huge talent. Her songs come from the heart... It doesn't matter if Sandrine is playing with a band or alone with an acoustic guitar. Her music is captivating. Each song entices you to listen to the next." Carmine Pascuzzi of MediaSearch felt, "it's great to see new female singing talent continue through the Australian music landscape. [The artist] has delivered a stunning first-up effort. She comes with unique, addictive vocals and she is sure to light up the singer-songwriter scene for many years."

Sandrine moved to the United States to record her second album, Dark Fades into Light (August 2006), working with producer Malcolm Burn (Daniel Lanois, Bob Dylan, Emmylou Harris, Chris Whitley) at Maison Bleue Studios, Kingston. She related how, "I came up there with a pile of songs. Wurlitzers and vintage keyboards were what I was into playing at home. When I got there, I started playing Malcolm’s pianos – real pianos – and found them so great to play and write on. Every day I would get up and play the piano and write a song and Malcolm would be like, 'That's pretty good; we should record that.' In the end, he really believed in what I was doing, so we did the whole album. Half of the songs were ones that I'd come over with; others were ones I came up with on the spot."

Session musicians were Kyle Fischer on guitar; George Javori, William Kuehn, Tim Powles each on drums; Adam Snyder on guitar and keyboards; and Peter Wetzler on accordion. In North America it was issued via Nettwerk Records initially in 2007 and again in April 2008, with an additional track, "Late Night Insominia".

Jo-Ann Greene of AllMusic, rated it at four-and-a-half stars and explained, "[she] labored hard on the set, working to wipe away all memory of the pop kitten that purred across the bland, commercialized pop of her debut set Trigger. Her efforts paid off, because Dark is a far more mature affair, with Burn's production astutely drawing out Sandrine's best and showcasing it brilliantly. Even so, this is still a pop set, but a very sophisticated one, even as the young singer's ingenuous sweetness tinged with naïveté remains on display, undisturbed by the eloquent trappings Burn's creates."

In France the album provided a single, "Where Do We Go" (2008), after it had been used in a TV ad. It is also used for the feature film soundtrack, Last Chance Harvey (Original Motion Picture Score) (December 2008).

AllMusic's William Ruhlmann reviewed the soundtrack and observed, "Often, the music sounds just one step – and a sensitive lyric – from developing into a pop/rock ballad. Sandrine's end credit song 'Where Do We Go' takes that extra step." Her music became known in Europe and the US by its placement in films, TV shows and ads. She performed shows in the New York City area in mid-2009.

Sandrine released her third album, Circles (2010), with Burn producing again.

=== Private life ===
Sandrine Daniels married Malcolm Burn, her record producer. They live in Kingston, New York.

== Discography ==
=== Albums ===
List of albums, with selected chart positions
| Title | Album details | Peak chart positions |
| Title | Album details | AUS Hitseekers |
|---|---|---|
| Trigger | Released: November 2003; Format: CD; Label: Sony Music Australia (5122052000) | 14 |
| Dark Fades into the Light | Released: August 2006; Format: CD; Label: Trigger Music (Trig03) | — |
| Circles | Released: 2010; Format: CD, digital; Label: Sandrine | — |

=== Singles ===
List of singles, with selected chart positions
| Title | Year | Peak chart positions | Album |
| Title | Year | AUS | Album |
|---|---|---|---|
| "Trigger" | 2003 | 28 | Trigger |
| "Let The Love" | 2005 | — | Dark Fades into the Light |
| "Where Do We Go" | 2007 | — | Dark Fades into the Light |
