= Everytime We Touch (Maggie Reilly song) =

1992 single by Maggie Reilly

Single by Maggie Reilly

from the album Echoes
- B-side: "Gaia"
- Released: 1992
- Genre: Pop rock
- Length: 3:59
- Label: EMI
- Songwriters: Maggie Reilly, Stuart Mackillop, Peter Risavy
- Producer: Armand Volker

Maggie Reilly singles chronology
| "What About Tomorrow's Children" (1991) | "Everytime We Touch" (1992) | "Wait" (1992) |

Music video
- "Everytime We Touch on YouTube

"Everytime We Touch" is a song jointly co-written and performed by Scottish singer Maggie Reilly for her 1992 debut solo album, Echoes. Reilly collaborated with Stuart Mackillop and Peter Risavy to write the song, which Armand Volker produced. Released on the Mambo Musik Records label, "Everytime We Touch" became a European hit, reaching number one in Norway for eight weeks. German dance music group Cascada later borrowed the song's chorus for their 2005 single "Everytime We Touch".

== Critical reception ==
Roch Parisien from AllMusic described the song as "a dreamy, memorable love song" in his review of Echoes.

== Formats and track listings ==
CD single

1. "Everytime We Touch" (radio mix) – 3:59
2. "Gaia" – 2:41
3. "Everytime We Touch" (long version) – 7:18
4. "Everytime We Touch" (Rhythm mix) – 4:21

7-inch single

1. "Everytime We Touch" – 3:59
2. "Gaia" – 2:41

12-inch single

1. "Everytime We Touch" (long version) – 7:18
2. "Everytime We Touch" – 3:59
3. "Everytime We Touch" (Rhythm mix) – 4:21

Cassette single

1. "Everytime We Touch" – 3:59
2. "Gaia" – 2:41

== Charts ==
=== Weekly charts ===
| Chart (1992–1993) | Peak position |
|---|---|
| Austria (Ö3 Austria Top 40) | 5 |
| Belgium (Ultratop 50 Flanders) | 47 |
| Europe (Eurochart Hot 100) | 21 |
| Finland (IFPI) | 10 |
| Germany (GfK) | 16 |
| Netherlands (Dutch Top 40 Tipparade) | 4 |
| Netherlands (Single Top 100) | 63 |
| Norway (VG-lista) | 1 |
| Sweden (Sverigetopplistan) | 34 |
| Switzerland (Schweizer Hitparade) | 24 |
| UK Singles (OCC) | 99 |

| Chart (2024) | Peak position |
|---|---|
| Poland (Polish Airplay Top 100) | 64 |

=== Year-end charts ===
| Chart (1992) | Position |
|---|---|
| Austria (Ö3 Austria Top 40) | 27 |
| Europe (Eurochart Hot 100) | 100 |
| Germany (Media Control) | 55 |

== Cascada usage ==
In 2005, the song's chorus was borrowed, with permission from Reilly, for a Eurodance version also called "Everytime We Touch", performed by German dance music group Cascada. This cover version was also a hit in Europe and became a top-10 in the United States, peaking at number 10 on the Billboard Hot 100. Although the new version has different verses, the writing credit still appears the same as it appeared on the original recording by Maggie Reilly.
