= Janez Detd. =

Belgian pop punk

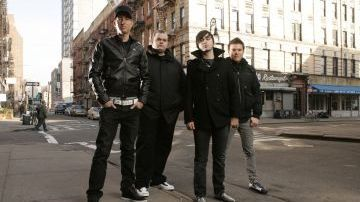
- Janez Detd band in 2007

Background information
- Origin: Belgium
- Genres: Pop punk
- Years active: 1995–present
- Labels: PIAS Records; Virgin Records; I Scream Records; Cabalero Records; Green Leaf Records
- Members: Nikolas Van der Veken; Tim Toegaert; Bram Steemans; Joeri Van Vaerenbergh; Wim Vanhenden
- Past members: Wim Vanhenden; Bob Haentjens; Raf Weyn; Dimitri Vink; Tomas Maes; Lennart Bossu
- Website: www.janezdetd.com

Janez Detd. (short for Janez Determined) is a Belgian pop punk band that formed in 1995.

== Band members ==
- Nikolas Van der Veken (Bones, Bientjes) – lead guitar and lead vocals
- Bram Steemans (The Machine) – drums
- Joeri Van Vaerenbergh – bass guitar and backing vocals
- Wim Vanhenden – guitar, backing vocals
- Brecht Claesen – percussions, backing vocals
- Pieter Dubois – trombone, guitar
- Yorgi Gritzelis – saxophone, guitar, backing vocals
- Gunter Callewaert – keys, samples
- Thadeus Jolie – trumpet
- Marieke Fierens – backing vocals

== Former members ==
- Joeri Van Vaerenbergh – bass guitar, backing vocals/screams
- Lennart Bossu – guitar, backing vocals
- Wim Vanhenden – guitar, backing vocals
- Bob Haentjens – bass guitar, backing vocals
- Thijs De Cloedt – guitar, backing vocals
- Tim Toegaert (Tammy, Ambi) – lead guitar, backing vocals
- Thomas Maes - bass guitar, backing vocals

== Discography ==
=== CDs ===
- Dignity And Teeth (maxi-CD, Green Leaf Records, 1996)
- Bleenies And Blockheads (CD, I Scream Records, 1998)
- Janez Detd. (CD, Cabalero/Virgin, 2000)
- Anti-Anthem (CD, Cabalero/Virgin, 2003)
- Killing Me (2005)
- Like Cold Rain Kills A Summer Day (2006)
- For Better For Worse (2008)
- 15 Years Of Fame (2009)

=== Special editions ===
- Bleenies And Blockheads (Japanese version)
- Anti-Anthem (Japanese version)

=== Singles ===
- "Walk Away"
- "Beaver Fever"
- "Saturday"
- "Rock On"
- "Take On Me"
- "Lisa (She's A Herpie)"
- "Summer's Gone"
- "Anti-Anthem"
- "Mala Vida"
- "Alright"
- "Raise Your Fist"
- "Killing Me"
- "Deep"
- "Your Love"
- "Not OK"

=== Tracks on compilations ===
- Alright – De Afrekening (Vol. 33) (2004)
- Anti-Anthem – Bel 2000 (2000 > 2004) (2009)
- Anti-Anthem – The Attack Of The Flaming Penguin (2003)
- Anti-Anthem – De Afrekening (Vol. 29) (2002)
- Beaver Fever – Midem 1999 (1999)
- Beaver Fever – Ready To Scroll (1998)
- Beaver Fever – Het beste uit de Belpop van 1998 (2006)
- Beaver Fever – 't Gaat Vooruit '98 (1998)
- Deep – De Afrekening (Vol. 38) (2005)
- Dispicable – The Best Of Belgium: Belgium's Best Punk Bands! (1996)
- Dorkshire – 5 Years Of Blood, Sweat and Tears (1999)
- Inferior – Teneramunda (1994)
- Jealous – The best Of Belgium: Belgium's Best Punk Bands! (1996)
- Killing Me – I Scream Summer Sampler '06 (2006)
- Killing Me – De Afrekening (Vol. 37) (2005)
- Kung-Fu vs To-fu – Elements (1999)
- Lisa (She's A Herpie) – Humo's Alle 2000 Goed (2000)
- Mala vida – De Afrekening (Vol. 31) (2003)
- Ne Me Quitte Pas – Puur Brel (2003)
- Need Some Time – Te Gek?! (Vol. 2) (2006)
- Not OK – Converse – The Mixtape (Vol. 1) (2010)
- Raise Your Fist – De Afrekening (Vol. 30) (2003)
- Rock On! (Debbie's A Spaz!) – Labels Sampler (2000)
- Rock On! (Debbie's A Spaz!) – Experience Music (2001)
- Rock On! (Debbie's A Spaz!) – Great Rock And Pop Music From Flanders (2001)
- Summer's Gone – Bel 2000 (2000 > 2004) (2009)
- Take On Me – Hit Club (2000.4) (2000)
- Take On Me – Bel 2000 (2000 > 2004) (2009)
- Veggie – The best Of Belgium: Belgium's Best Punk Bands! (1996)

== Track listing ==
Dignity And Teeth
- Pervert Jay
- Jealous
- Rockstar Stress
- Victim

Bleenies And Blockheads
- Hidden Track
- Kung Fu vs Tofu
- Beaver Fever
- Fake P
- U.Z.O.
- Saturday
- Dorkshire
- Bunani (instrumental)
- Walk Away
- So Thin
- Nursing
- Kool
- Victim

Janez Detd.
- Kick Off
- Angeline
- Rock On!
- Going Mental
- Old Enough
- Hey Myron!
- Roy Rogers (instrumental)
- Take On Me
- Ferdy
- Lisa (She's A Herpie)
- Summer's Gone (And So Is Q107 FM)
- Heins 57
- Hidden track
- Bloopers

Anti-Anthems
- Raise Your Fist
- Class of '92
- Anti-Anthem
- Individuality
- Falling (Will I Ever Come Across Another You?)
- Kids Today
- Blame
- Alright
- Don't Forget
- Major Mistake
- FM Invasion
- Mala Vida
- Tonight
- Dead End

Killing Me
- The Tide Rises (instrumental)
- Killing Me (II)
- Deep
- Killing Me (I)
- In These Days
- Crossed Your Heart
- Fires To Come
- Die For You
- Lack Of Shame
- Death Alone (From Death Can Save)
- Breaking The Waves
- Killing Me (III)
- Until The End Of The World (I Will Always Love You)
- The One

Like Cold Rain Kills A Summer Day
- Killing Me (II)
- Anti-Anthem
- Deep
- In These Days
- Killing Me (I)
- Raise Your Fist
- Alright
- Crossed Your Heart
- Die For You
- Kids Today
- Breaking The Waves
- FM Invasion
- Fires To Come
- Mala Vida

For Better For Worse
- For Better For Worse
- My Life/My Way
- Without You
- You!
- Broken
- Goodbye
- I Hate You (Yes, I'm Judging You!)
- Take 5 (How To Survive High School Without Any Real Friends)
- Your Love (I Don't Wanna Lose Tonight)
- Hilmont High School (I Pledge Allegiance To JD)
- Never Last (All Our Friends Hate Us For This)
- 1983
- The Truth (Please Give Me Some Truth)
- I Want You

15 Years Of Fame
- Beaver Fever
- Saturday
- Rock On
- Lisa
- Take On Me
- Summer's Gone
- Anti-Anthem
- Raise Your Fist
- Mala Vida
- Alright
- Killing Me
- Deep
- Breaking The Waves
- Crossed Your Heart
- Your Love (live)

Bleenies And Blockheads (Japanese version)
- ?

Anti-Anthems (Japanese version)
- Raise Your Fist
- Class Of '92
- Anti-Anthem
- Individuality
- Falling (Will I Ever Come Across Another You?)
- Kids Today
- Blame
- Alright (One More Shot)
- Don't Forger
- Major Mistake
- FM Invasion
- Mala Vida
- Tonight
- Dead End
- Rock On (live)
- Anti-Anthem (live)
