= Sylver =

Belgian Eurodance and pop group

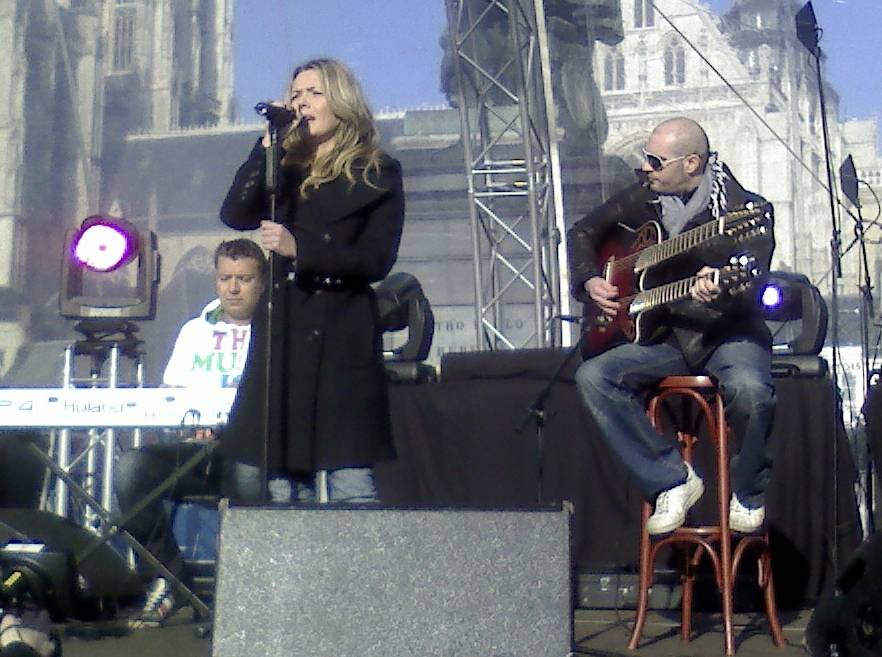

Background information
- Origin: Belgium
- Genres: Eurodance; trance; pop
- Years active: 2000–2013, 2016–present
- Members: Wout Van Dessel (2000–present); John Miles Jr. (2009–present); Silvy De Bie (2000–2013, 2016–present); Regi Penxten (2000–present)
- Website: www.sylver.be

Sylver is a Belgian Eurodance and pop group, originally consisting of lead vocalist Silvy De Bie (born 4 January 1981), DJ and producer Regi Penxten (born 4 March 1976), and keyboardist/songwriter Wout Van Dessel (born 19 October 1974). They were active from 2000 until 2013, when De Bie decided to focus on her solo career, but they returned in 2016.

== History ==
=== 2000–02: Career beginnings and "Chances" ===
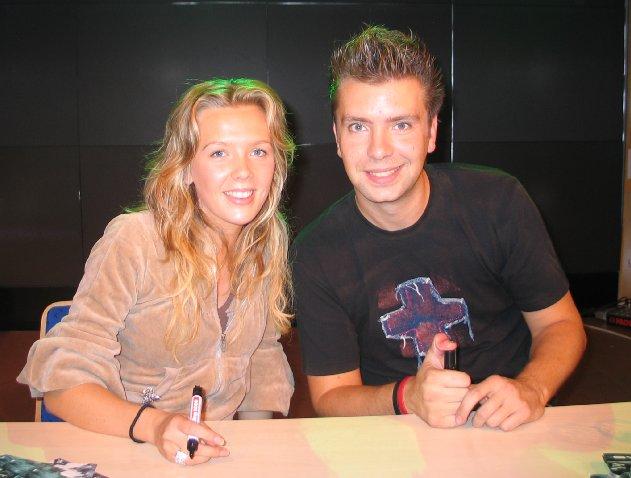
Silvy De Bie and Wout Van Dessel (2004)

The band was formed in 2000 as "Liquid feat. Silvy" and released the single "Turn the Tide" in France and Belgium. The single was released in the rest of Europe in 2001 under the band's new name, "Sylver." In Germany, the single quickly rose to number 8 in the charts, and within eight weeks reached number 2 (behind Atomic Kitten's "Whole Again"), staying in the top 10 for 12 weeks. The debut album "Chances" followed a month later, debuting at number 16 and spending 49 weeks in the top 100, making it Sylver's most successful studio album to date. Follow-up singles "Forever In Love", "In Your Eyes," and "Forgiven" also charted successfully. In 2001, "Skin" was released exclusively in Belgium, while in 2002, "The Smile Has Left Your Eyes" was released as the sixth and final single, only in Spain, where it peaked at number 5.

=== 2003–05: "Little Things" and "Nighttime Calls" ===
In 2003, the second album Little Things was released with similar success, peaking at number 7 on the Belgian album charts. It featured the hit singles "Livin' My Life" and "Why Worry." Other singles from the album included the double A-side "Shallow Water"/"Confused," and the fourth and final single "Wild Horses," which was released in Belgium and Germany in 2003, though with limited success. On 2 November 2004, the third studio album Nighttime Calls was released. It became Sylver's least successful studio album to date, peaking at only number 23 on the Belgian album charts. The album's first single, "Love is an Angel," entered the Belgian top 10 immediately upon its release on 20 September. In 2005, the follow-up singles "Make It" and "Take Me Back" were released, achieving moderate success in Belgium and Germany, respectively.

=== 2006–07: "Crossroads" and "The Hit Collection" ===
The fourth studio album, Crossroads, was released in May 2006. The major hit was "Lay All Your Love On Me," a cover of ABBA, marking Sylver's first-ever cover version single release, which peaked at number 5 on the Belgian singles chart. From this point onward, in addition to using the synthesizer and drum machine, Sylver incorporated guitar, piano, and various percussion instruments, resulting in a more mature pop sound. Follow-up singles "One Night Stand" and "Why" were released as the second and third singles, respectively. In 2007, the band's first compilation album, "Best Of – The Hit Collection 2001–2007," was released, featuring "The One" as its sole single, which peaked at number 4 on the Belgian singles chart.

=== 2008–09: "Sacrifice" and Addition of John Miles Jr. ===
In 2008, the singles "One World, One Dream" and "Rise Again" were released. In 2009, Sylver added English guitarist John Miles Jr. as their third band member. He had previously been part of the popular Belgian group Milk Inc. As a trio, they released three more songs: "I Hate You Now," a cover of Mike Oldfield's "Foreign Affair," and "Music," which was originally by John Miles Jr.'s father, John Miles, and also featured John Miles as a guest artist. Sylver's fifth studio album, Sacrifice, was released on 8 May 2009 exclusively in Belgium, where it peaked at number 3 on the album charts. The album won the band the TMF award for "Best Domestic Album" in 2009.

=== 2010–12: "Decade" and Single Releases ===
In 2010, Sylver released their second compilation album, "Decade – The Very Best Of Sylver," to celebrate their 10th anniversary, with "It's My Life" being the only single from the album. The album peaked at number 1 on the Belgian album charts, becoming Sylver's most successful album in Belgium, while the single achieved a top 20 spot on the Belgian singles chart. In addition to their anniversary, Sylver released a new version of their debut single, "Turn the Tide." In 2011 and 2012, the singles "Stop Feeling Sorry" and "City Of Angels" were released as standalone singles. These two songs mark the final releases featuring original lead vocalist Silvy De Bie (a.k.a. Seeley's Girl), who would leave the band the following year after thirteen years.

=== 2014: Departure of De Bie and Hiatus ===
The group's original lead vocalist, Silvy De Bie, left the band in early 2014, leaving the band without a vocalist and facing an uncertain future, which led the band to go on a temporary hiatus.

=== 2016 Return ===
In the spring of 2016, the band officially announced their reunion and began writing new material. In 2017, they released the single "Turn Your Love Around".

In October 2019, Sylver released the single "I Won't Wait" and announced their "Sylver Lining Tour 2020," featuring a full live band to celebrate their 20-year anniversary. The tour was set to kick off at Concertzaal Casino in Sint-Niklaas, Belgium on 20 March 2020.

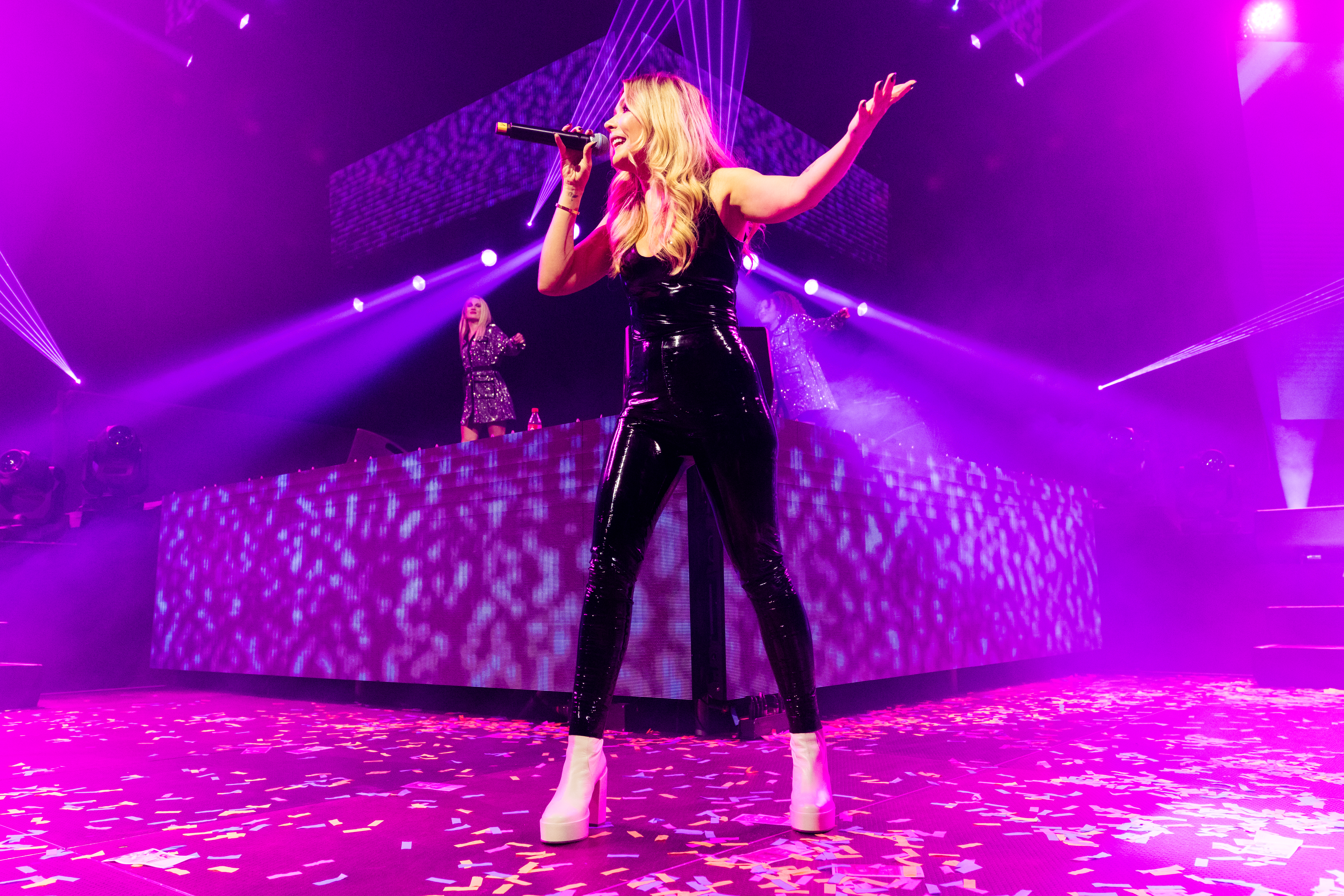
Sylver concert in Germany in 2024

== Discography ==
=== Studio albums ===
Year	Title	Chart positions			
Year	Title	BEL	NED	GER	AUT
2001	Chances	2	40	16	38
2003	Little Things	7	27	12	56
2004	Nighttime Calls	23	50	34	75
2006	Crossroads	9	70	39	72
2009	Sacrifice	3	—	—	—

=== Compilation albums ===
Year	Title	Chart positions			
Year	Title	BEL	NED	GER	AUT
2007	Best Of – The Hit Collection 2001–2007	20	91	50	
2010	Decade – The Very Best Of Sylver	1	29	19	

=== Singles ===
Year	Single	Peak chart positions						Album
Year	Single	BEL (Vl)	NED	GER	AUT	SPA	SUI	Album
2000	"Turn the Tide"	1	15	2	3	16	44	Chances
2001	"Skin"	2	—	—	—	—	—	Chances
2001	"Forever in Love"	11	65	10	27	17	79	Chances
2001	"In Your Eyes"	19	53	20	41	—	—	Chances
2001	"Forgiven"	9	35	25	52	16	88	Chances
2002	"The Smile Has Left Your Eyes"	—	—	—	—	5	—	Chances
2003	"Livin' My Life"	5	33	10	40	—	99	Little Things
2003	"Why Worry"	10	34	44	67	—	—	Little Things
2003	"Shallow Water/Confused"	20	60	47	75	—	—	Little Things
2003	"Wild Horses"	25	—	-	—	—	—	Little Things
2003	"Lonely Christmas"	—	—	—	—	—	—	Singles only
2004	"Love Is An Angel"	4	27	18	53	—	—	Nighttime Calls
2005	"Make It"	12	78	49	—	—	—	Nighttime Calls
2005	"Take Me Back"	6	—	-	—	—	—	Nighttime Calls
2006	"Lay All Your Love On Me"	5	38	26	32	—	—	Crossroads
2006	"One Night Stand"	24	—	—	—	—	—	Crossroads
2006	"Why"	25	—	—	—	—	—	Crossroads
2007	"The One"	—	—	—	—	—	—	Best Of – The Hit Collection 2001–2007
2008	"One World One Dream"	21	—	—	—	—	—	Sacrifice
2008	"Rise Again"	21	—	—	—	—	—	Sacrifice
2009	"I Hate You Now"	8	—	—	—	—	—	Sacrifice
2009	"Foreign Affair"	3	—	77	—	—	—	Sacrifice
2009	"Music" (feat. John Miles)	11	—	—	—	—	—	Sacrifice
2010	"It's My Life"	20	—	—	—	—	—	Decade – The Very Best of Sylver
2010	"Turn the Tide (2010 Version)"	16	—	—	—	—	—	Singles only
2011	"Stop Feeling Sorry"	44	—	—	—	—	—	Singles only
2012	"City Of Angels"	29	—	—	—	—	—	Singles only
2017	"Turn Your Love Around"	—	—	—	—	—	—	Singles only
2019	"I Won't Wait"	—	—	—	—	—	—	—
2020	"Losing My Religion"	_	_	_	_	_	_	_
"—" denotes releases that did not chart or were not released in that country.
