= Chances (Sylver album) =

Studio album by Sylver
- Released: 5 May 2001
- Genre: Europop; Trance
- Label: Urban/Universal Music
- Producer: Regi, DJ Wout

Sylver chronology
Chances (2001)	Little Things (2003)

Chances is the debut album by Belgian vocal trance group Sylver. Their debut single, "Turn the Tide" climbed to the top of the official local club/dance chart soon after its release. Second single "Skin" followed in January 2001. The album spawned three more singles: the dance track "Forever in Love", the ballad "In Your Eyes" and "Forgiven". In Germany, the album and the track "Turn the Tide" were certified gold for selling over 500,000 units together.

== Track listing ==
1. "Turn the Tide" (8:01)
2. "Skin" (4:30)
3. "Forgiven" (3:30)
4. "Forever in Love" (4:30)
5. "In Your Eyes" (4:00)
6. "Mystery of Tomorrow" (5:00)
7. "The Smile Has Left Your Eyes" (4:30)
8. "The Edge of Life" (3:30)
9. "Angel on My Shoulder" (4:30)
10. "Secrets" (4:30)
11. "Turn the Tide" (CJ Stone Remix) - hidden track
12. "Skin" (Velvet Girl Remix) - hidden track

== Charts ==
=== Weekly charts ===
Chart (2001)	Peak position
Austrian Albums (Ö3 Austria)	38
Belgian Albums (Ultratop Flanders)	2
Dutch Albums (Album Top 100)	91
German Albums (Offizielle Top 100)	16

=== Year-end charts ===
Chart (2001)	Position
Belgian Albums (Ultratop Flanders)	19
German Albums (Offizielle Top 100)	70
Chart (2002)	Position
German Albums (Offizielle Top 100)	99
