= Little Things (Sylver album) =

Studio album by Sylver
- Released: April 2003
- Genre: Eurodance; Trance; Europop
- Label: Urban Records

Sylver chronology
Chances (2001)	Little Things (2003)	Nighttime Calls (2004)

Little Things is the second album by Sylver, released in April 2003.

"Livin' My Life", "Why Worry" and "Shallow Waters" were the first three singles released from the album. The fourth single, "Wild Horses" was only released in Belgium.

== Track listing ==
1. "Livin' My Life" (4:00)
2. "Why Worry" (3:00)
3. "Shallow Water" (3:30)
4. "Wild Horses" (4:00)
5. "Confused" (3:30)
6. "So Afraid" (4:30)
7. "Weeping Willows" (6:00)
8. "Never Ever" (4:00)
9. "Heal My Heart" (6:00)
10. "Little Things" (3:00)
11. "Je Ne Sais Pas" (4:30) - hidden track

== Charts ==
Chart (2003)	Peak position
Austrian Albums Chart	56
Belgian Albums Chart	7
Germany Albums Charts	12
Hungarian Albums (MAHASZ)	37
Swiss Albums Chart	98
