= Milk Inc. =

Belgian dance band

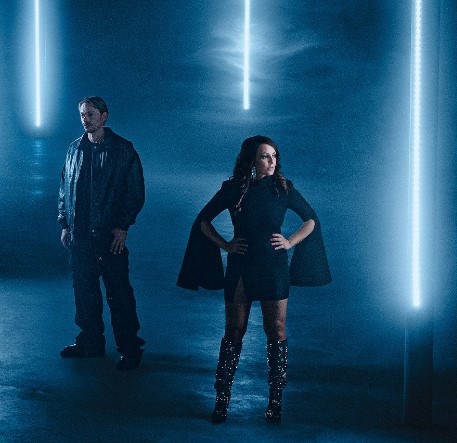
- Regi Penxten (left) and Linda Mertens in 2025

Background information
- Origin: Belgium
- Genres: Eurodance, techno, electronic, vocal trance
- Years active: 1996–present
- Labels: ARS Entertainment; Antler Subway; Zooland Records
- Members: Regi Penxten; Filip Vandueren; Linda Mertens; Merel Cappaert; Michael Schack; Peter Schreurs
- Past members: Ivo Donckers; Nikkie van Lierop; Sofie Winters; John Miles Jr. Karine Boelaerts; Ann Vervoort
- Website: www.milkinc.be

Milk Inc. is a dance music group that formed in the commercial dance scene in Belgium in 1996. The discography of the group comprises seven studio albums and 41 singles.

== History ==
The group started out as "Milk Incorporated" ("La Vache" for French-language releases), later shortening their name to "Milk Inc." In its early days as Milk Inc., the band also had a guitarist and harpist, John Miles Jr.

The band has had many line-up changes throughout its history. The band has found much success in Europe, with many of their singles charting in countries such as the Netherlands, United Kingdom, France and Spain. They are most successful in their native country Belgium, where they have 27 hit singles which have been in the Ultratop chart, 22 of them being in the top ten and four of them being number ones. Furthermore, all of their seven albums have charted there, with two of them reaching number one. Milk Inc. is the current record holder for the number of TMF Awards in Belgium and the Netherlands, with a total of 17 awards received.

In 2004, they released "Whisper", Mertens's first number-one hit on the Ultratop Charts in Belgium.

Early in 2005, Milk Inc. performed at the Tsunami 1212 benefit festival in Belgium. That year, they released "Blind" and "Go to Hell", both reaching the top 5.

On 9 June 2006, they released a version of "Tainted Love" fused with beats from Deep Zone's 1995 track "It's Gonna Be Alright".

In September 2006, the album Supersized was released along with the single "Run". The album reached number 3 in Belgium, and "Run" peaked at number 7. The song was widely played in Poland, which led to an invitation to perform at the Hity Na Czasie festival the following year.

On 30 September 2006, a concert celebrating the group's 10th anniversary took place at Sportpaleis in Antwerp. It was fully recorded and released on DVD as Milk Inc. Supersized Live at the Sportpaleis 2006 on 8 December 2006. The official video for the final Supersized single, "No Angel", was filmed during the show.

The Sportpaleis concert marked a turning point, as dance groups were often associated with lip-syncing. Supersized was the first in a series of full-band live performances. Subsequent shows were titled Supersized 2, Forever, Blackout, Eclipse, Milk Inc. Fifteen, Miracle, and MilkFest. DVDs released from these shows include Best of Supersized 2, Forever Live at Sportpaleis, and Milk Inc. 15 – The Very Best Of.

On 22 July 2006, the single "Sunrise" was released, reaching number 3 in Belgium. Despite this, the version played on Belgian radios was the remix by Pedro Salazar, characterized by a guitar beat that was trendy at the time. The dance version of "Sunrise" was later popularized through the group's live performances. In the Netherlands, the remix by Jeckyll & Hyde was the most played; at the time, Jump Style was very popular in the country, and the characteristic beats of this style incorporated into "Sunrise" boosted the single there (position 13 on the charts).

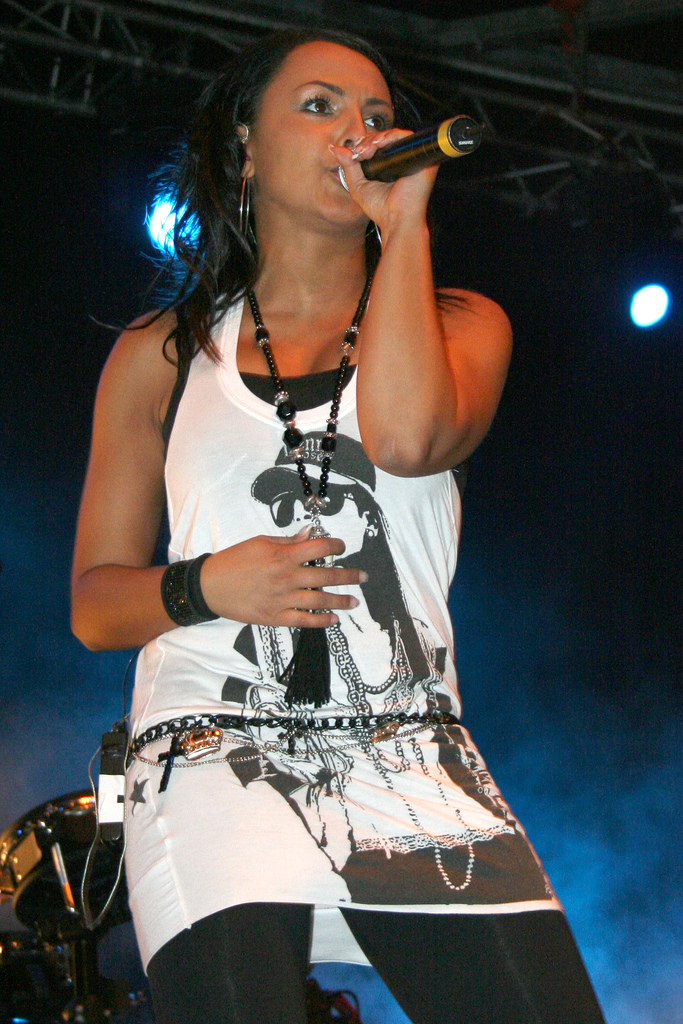
Mertens at the 2007 Gentse Feesten

In October 2007, the album The Best Of was released, reaching number 2 in Belgium.

On 19 October 2007, the single "Tonight" was released in Belgium and also in the Netherlands. "Tonight" reached position 6 in Belgium. In the Netherlands, the single rode a residual wave following the success of "Sunrise" and was played on major radio stations, reaching position 44 on the charts.

On 16 June 2008, the album Forever and the single of the same name were released. With Forever, Milk Inc. reached the top of the Belgian Albums Top 200 chart for the first time. The single "Forever" was also voted by the public to be the first song played on the then-new Belgian radio station MNM, where Regi later had his own show. A French version of the song "Forever" was also released in France.

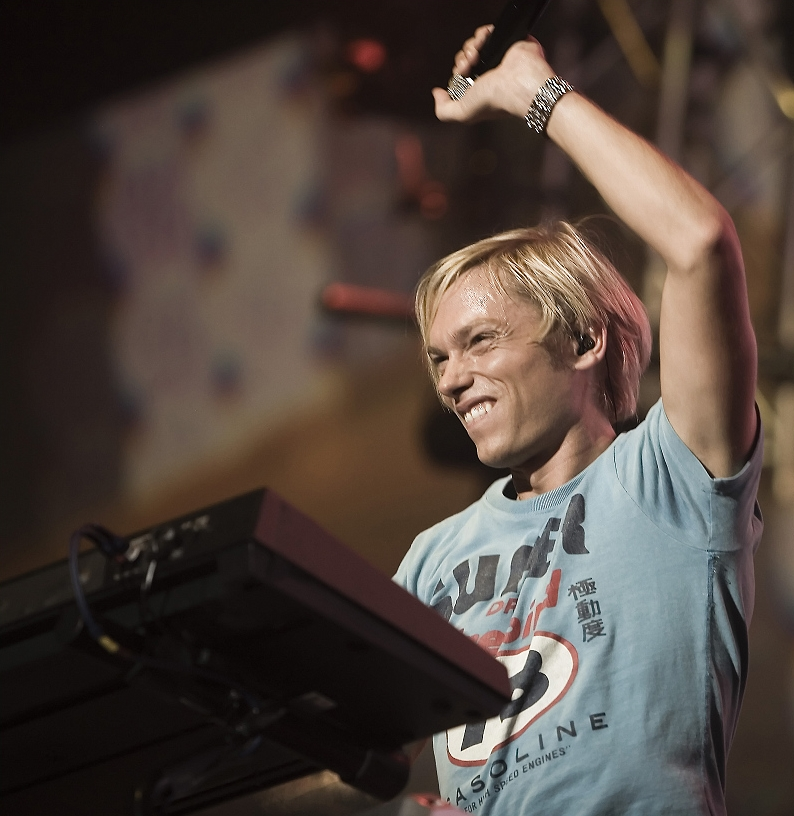
Regi Penxten performing in Sportpaleis Antwerp, 2008

On 5 September 2008, the last single from the album Forever, titled "Race", was released, reaching position 18 in Belgium. It was the only Milk Inc. single since 2001 not to reach the top 10. At that time, the radio station Top Radio, for example, chose to play "Morning Light" from the 2006 album Supersized instead of "Race". The song gained prominence because it was sung at the openings of the Forever tour shows. Its success led "Morning Light" to be included in the tracklist of the Top Request 2009 album released by Top Radio. Having a song released over three years earlier played daily on the radio—even though it was not an official single—reflected Milk Inc.’s relevance and popularity in Belgium.

Also in 2008, the track "Guilty" from the album Forever was considered by the group as a possible new single and was even digitally released in Canada with previously unreleased remixes. However, the group abandoned the idea and on 3 July 2009, released the single "Blackout", which reached number one on the charts in Belgium. The track uses samples from the classic "Time Modulator" by Zolex, a Belgian dance project founded by DJ Maurizzio in 1995. The single was also released in the Netherlands with the "Dutch Radio Mix" reaching position 84 on the charts.

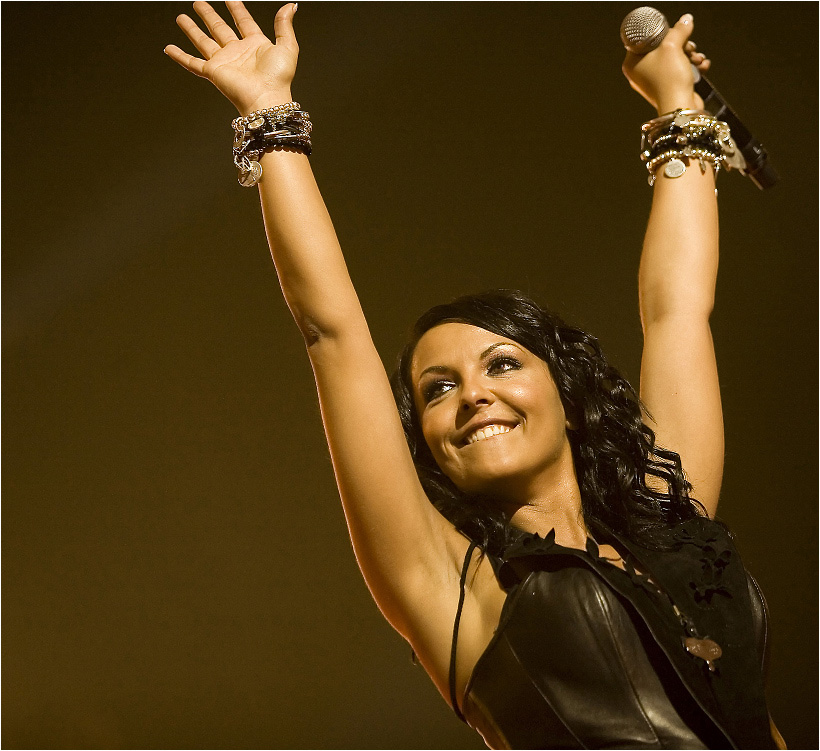
Linda Mertens in Antwerp, 2008

In 2009, Milk Inc. performed at the last edition of the TMF Awards, singing "Storm" and "Blackout". It was the ninth consecutive year the group won the award for "Best National Dance Group", as well as the "Best National Live Band" category. During the awards, DJ Bob Sinclar, who won the "Best International Dance Group", asked who Milk Inc. was—he was impressed because everyone was talking about them—and in an interview said in astonishment: "They are even more popular than me."

The group's popularity was so great that they were invited to perform at Rock Werchter 2009, a huge rock event in Belgium. They performed simultaneously with the night's main act, Metallica. The members of Milk Inc. were anxious because weeks before, groups on the internet threatened to riot and throw objects at the stage, refusing to accept a dance music group as one of the festival's headliners. But to Penxten and Mertens's surprise, the audience filled the arena and sang along from start to finish, making it one of the most memorable performances in the group's career.

On 15 February 2010, they officially released the single "Storm", their second consecutive single to reach number one in Belgium. Although it was officially released only in 2010, the song had already been performed live in 2009 at the Sportpaleis. The song also reached the top 10 in Wallonia, the French- and German-speaking region of Belgium. "Storm" also enjoyed relative success on radio stations in Bulgaria.

In February 2010, the song "When the Pain Comes" was released. The song is not an official single and was included as part of the charity album Te gek 4!?

On 9 July 2010, the single "Chasing the Wind" was released, reaching number 10 in Belgium.

On 31 January 2011, the single "Fire" was released. At the time, Filip Vandueren commented that they like to test and experiment with styles and admitted that "Chasing the Wind" ended up being "too pop", but "Fire" would be the group's new "Go to Hell", with the strong beats characteristic of Milk Inc. "Fire" reached 5th position on the Belgian charts.

In March 2011, the album Nomansland was released, reaching number one in Belgium.

On 27 June 2011, the last single from the album Nomansland, titled "Shadow", was released. The single was lukewarm in Belgium compared to the other singles from the album, reaching position 42.

On 12 September 2019, the group released the single "I'll Be There (La Vache)", with new lyrics; the song used samples from the beats of "La Vache". The song reached number 6 in Belgium.

In 2012, the group released the single "Miracle", which was composed by Penxten as a tribute to his fiancée. The first performance of the song was an acoustic version sung by Mertens during Penxten's wedding ceremony with Elke Vanelderen.

In 2013, the group released the album Undercover, their first cover album, with the first single being "Last Night a DJ Saved My Life", which not only entered the top 10 in Belgium but also made it onto the French charts. Other singles from the album include "Imagination", "Sweet Child of Mine", and a new version of the group's first successful single titled "La Vache 2013".

The album Undercover originated from a show called "Milk Inc. Friday", where every Friday Penxten and Mertens presented a cover on the radio station Qmusic. Besides the songs released on the album, the group also brought to the radio versions of "Dancing with Tears in My Eyes" by Ultravox and the iconic "I Will Survive" by Gloria Gaynor, both available on SoundCloud.

In October 2014, Milk Inc. released the single "Don't Say Goodbye". At the same time, the group announced that it would be taking an indefinite break. The reason for this was the birth of Mertens's first daughter.

In 2016, Milk Inc. resumed their career with a 20th-anniversary tour. To celebrate the occasion, they presented a new drum and Bass style version of "Sunrise", which was played on Qmusic radio and during shows. The band was also preparing for another show at the Sportpaleis, but the celebration was interrupted by the death of Mertens' daughter in April 2017 from cancer at two years old. Penxten stated that he wanted to give Mertens all the time she needed to recover and that he did not want to pressure her to sing again. Penxten continued composing and doing collaborations with other artists as well as solo. Mertens did not return to music for several years.

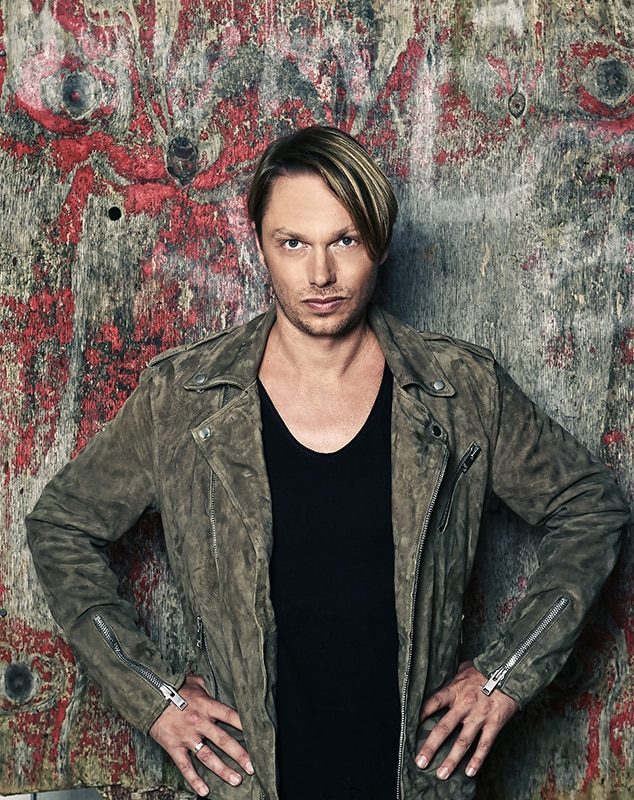
Penxten in 2019

In 2020, Penxten announced that Mertens's return to Milk Inc. was unlikely. Meanwhile, he focused on his solo career, releasing hits like "Where Did You Go" and "Ellie". His solo trajectory gained momentum in Belgium, and in 2021, he sold out the Sportpaleis with his own show titled "Kom Wat Dichterbij", the same name as his first single in Dutch, which reached the top of the Belgian charts. There was much speculation about a possible appearance by Mertens at the event, but she did not show up. Still, Milk Inc. classics were performed by other Belgian artists.

In 2022, Penxten returned to the Sportpaleis with another solo show. At the end of the performance, the next show was announced: "The Return". The title further fueled speculation about Mertens's possible comeback. When asked, Penxten avoided giving a direct answer, explaining that the name referred to a return to the roots of Eurodance and trance—as demonstrated by his single, "Horen, Zien En Zwijgen", which recalls the early years of Milk Inc.

After years of seclusion, Mertens quietly returned to the stage in 2022, beginning her career revival outside Belgium. The singer participated in a "remember" festival in Blackpool, England, alongside other names from the Belgian dance scene, such as Evi Goffin (Lasgo former singer), Jessy, and Dee Dee.

Mertens then performed at festivals in the UK, Spain, and Ireland. She also made a one-time appearance in Canada, where she performed "Insomnia" by Faithless in a duet with Evi Goffin. According to an interview with Nina magazine, the fact that the foreign audience was unaware of her personal story—marked by the loss of her daughter Lio—made these performances less emotionally charged. For her, these shows served as a kind of rehearsal for her return to performing in Belgium.

Mertens returned to performing in Belgium in October 2023 with "The Return" show at the Sportpaleis. After more than an hour and a half of the show, Mertens entered the stage with her back turned, covered by a black cloak. The audience greeted her with shouts before Mertens began performing "Whisper", followed by "Run" and "Blackout".

In the second part of "The Return" show at the Sportpaleis, Filip Vandueren joined Penxten to perform "La Vache". Mertens then returned to the stage to perform the hits "Miracle", "Walk on Water", and closed the concert with "Go to Hell".

After the performance, Mertens used her social media to express the meaning of that moment. "My return is not just a revival of my career, it is a tribute to the memory of my beautiful daughter", she wrote on Instagram.

The end of the show also brought a big surprise: the official announcement of Milk Inc.'s return, as well as two concerts scheduled for 2024 at the Sportpaleis, under the title "Regi vs Milk Inc." The same day, the single "Walk on Water" was voted by the Belgian radio station Qmusic's audience as the best song of the 2000s.

The next night, Mertens returned to the stage for the second "The Return" show. The performance is available on the free streaming platform VTM GO.

Following "The Return" performance, tickets for the first two "Regi vs Milk Inc." shows sold out quickly, leading to the announcement of five more dates—including an afternoon show. With this, Milk Inc. surpassed its record of six consecutive shows at the Sportpaleis, set during the band's peak in 2008.

During the shows, the repertoire focused on the band's legacy, including the songs: "Breathe Without You", "Living a Lie", "Sleepwalker", "Never Again", "Forever", "Run", "Whisper", "Blackout", "La Vache", "Tonight", "Storm", "Tainted Love", "Losing Love", "Promise", "In My Eyes", "I Don't Care", "Sunrise", "Walk on Water", and "Go to Hell". Despite the extensive setlist, some notable hits were left out, such as "Land of the Living", "Race", "Time", "No Angel", and "Last Night a DJ Saved My Life".

The reaction on social media was overwhelmingly positive, especially regarding Mertens's performance. Fans praised her stage presence and even requested exclusive Milk Inc. concerts without the participation of singers associated with Penxten's solo projects, such as Pauline Slange, Jaap Reesema, Arno, and Melanie.

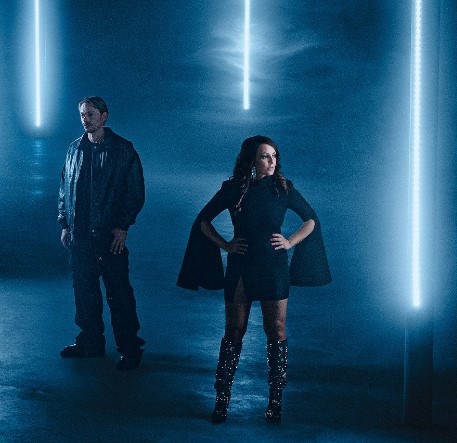
"Unstoppable" single cover

Eleven years after stepping out of the spotlight, Penxten and Mertens returned with the single "Unstoppable" on 4 September 2025, which features lyrics co-written by Mertens herself.

Mertens explains: "Unstoppable is inspired by my personal story and the story of Milk Inc., but above all, it's about strength and positivity. The track carries a universal message: sometimes you feel lost and can no longer see the path forward. But eventually, the fog clears. And then you are stronger than ever — unstoppable!"

== Members ==
=== Current ===
==== Regi Penxten ====
Regi was born on 4 March 1976 at Hasselt in Belgium.

At the age of 12, he got his first computer connected to a synthesizer. He studied at the music academy to learn to read music and he also played the guitar from an early age.

Milk Inc's and Regi's hit success started with "La Vache" in 1996, which was a big hit. He has also worked with several singers and other producers.

==== Linda Mertens ====
Linda was born on 20 July 1978 in Wilrijk, Belgium.

She studied art and after high school spent two years studying hairdressing.

In 2000, Linda went to a club with some friends where Regi was DJing. While there she asked him if he needed a singer for any of his projects and she was asked to audition for Milk Inc.

=== Former ===
==== Filip Vandueren ====
Filip Vandueren was the last one that co-produced Milk Inc. along with Regi Penxten and played keyboards in the band's full live shows and concerts in the past. Filip announced in November 2025 that he was leaving the band after a 30-year tenure.

==== Ivo Donckers ====
Co-founder and member from the start of the project Milk Inc. until 2000.

As a studio technician at Antler Subway (EMI), he was responsible for many projects and remixes for 2Unlimited, Ace of Base, 2 Fabiola, and more.

==== Nikkie Van Lierop ====
Born 7 March 1963 in Simmern, Germany, Anita Dominika Cornelia van Lierop, better known as Nikkie Van Lierop, by her artist name "Jade 4U", and as a co-founder of Lords of Acid.

In 1992, she had a UK Top 20 hit as the featured vocalist on Praga Khan's "Injected With a Poison".

Five years later, in the spring of 1997, Praga Khan produced a remix of the song "La Vache" for the band (then known as Milk Incorporated), with the track becoming a Top 40 hit in the UK under the name "Good Enough (La Vache)".

Jade 4U can be seen in the music video for "La Vache", which was filmed in England.

Since then Nikkie, along with Praga Khan, contributed lyrics and melody.

After the resounding success of the songs, she sang on Milk Inc.‘s first live tour performances.

In France, she left the band in order to concentrate on Praga Khan and Lords of Acid, which had gained a cult following in the United States.

==== Sofie Winters ====
Sofie Winters was born 22 May 1976 in Leuven, Belgium. She replaced Van Lierop for a few months. During her time at Milk Inc, Winters was a singer in the song "Free Your Mind". Winters was also a model and actress.

==== Ann Vervoort ====
Graphic designer Ann Vervoort (10 March 1977 – 22 April 2010) was a dancer for Pat Krimson before she joined Milk Inc.

She was brought in by Regi Penxten in 1997 as a replacement singer for Sofie Winters in performances.

Karine Boelaerts, a Belgian studio singer, who was already working for other projects such as 2 Fabiola was hired to record all the songs.

In the middle of September 2000, Vervoort left Milk Inc. and moved to Ibiza with her boyfriend, Patrick Claesen (alias Pat Krimson), producer of 2Fabiola, Nunca and Leopold 3. There they founded the record label Beni Musa Records.

Vervoort was replaced by Linda Mertens.

On 22 April 2010, Vervoort was found dead at her house in Houthalen-Helchteren. According to the newspaper Het Laatste Nieuws, an amount of alcohol and drugs were involved.

=== Timeline ===
Note: Dates are approximate.

== Discography ==
=== Albums ===
Year	Title	Chart positions			Certifications (Ultratop)
Year	Title	BEL (FL)	NLD	UK	Certifications (Ultratop)
1998	Apocalyps(e) Cow	5	—	—	
2000	Land of the Living	26	58	—	
2001	Double Cream	39	—	—	
2002	Milk Inc.	—	—	47	
2003	Closer	11	—	—	
2004	Best of Milk Inc.	—	—	—	
2005	Essential	—	—	—	
2006	Supersized	3	—	—	Platinum
2007	Best Of	2	—	—	Gold
2008	Forever	1	—	—	2× Platinum
2011	Nomansland	1	—	—	Gold
2011	15: The Very Best Of	4	—	—	
2013	Undercover	1	—	—	

=== Singles ===
Year	Song	Album	Chart positions									
Year	Song	Album	BEL (FL)	BEL (WA)	BEL (Dance)	AUS	FRA	GER	NLD	SPA	SWE	UK
1996	"Cream"	Apocalypse Cow	–	–	–	–	–	–	–	–	–	–
1996	"La Vache"	Apocalypse Cow	–	24	18	–	3	–	86	–	26	23
1997	"Free Your Mind"	Apocalypse Cow	–	–	–	–	19	–	–	–	54	–
1998	"Inside of Me"	Apocalypse Cow	–	–	6	–	62	–	–	–	–	–
1999	"In My Eyes"	Apocalypse Cow	2	–	2	29	–	–	–	–	–	9
1999	"Promise"	Apocalypse Cow	3	–	3	–	–	–	–	–	–	–
1999	"Oceans"	Apocalypse Cow	8	–	2	74	–	–	–	8	–	–
1999	"Losing Love"	Land of the Living	2	–	1	–	–	–	–	4	–	–
2000	"Walk on Water"	Land of the Living	1	–	1	70	–	47	3	1	–	10
2000	"Land of the Living"	Land of the Living	2	–	2	–	–	–	16	7	–	18
2001	"Livin' a Lie"	Land of the Living	3	–	3	–	–	56	44	4	–	–
2001	"Don't Cry"	Land of the Living	Promotional single only									
2001	"Never Again"	Land of the Living	17	–	2	–	–	–	69	1	–	–
2001	"Wide Awake"	Closer	2	–	9	–	–	–	50	1	–	–
2002	"Sleepwalker"	Closer	6	–	2	–	–	–	–	5	–	–
2002	"Breathe Without You"	Closer	7	–	7	–	–	92	45	5	–	–
2003	"Time"	Closer	10	–	4	–	–	–	–	–	–	–
2003	"The Sun Always Shines on T.V."	Closer	5	–	2	–	–	71	82	–	–	86
2004	"I Don't Care" (featuring Silvy)	Closer	3	–	7	–	–	–	66	–	–	–
2004	"Whisper"	Supersized	1	–	14	–	–	–	–	–	–	–
2005	"Blind"	Supersized	5	–	2	–	–	–	–	–	–	–
2005	"Go to Hell"	Supersized	4	–	7	–	–	–	–	–	–	–
2006	"Tainted Love"	Supersized	7	–	2	–	–	–	37	–	–	–
2006	"Run"	Supersized	7	–	14	–	–	–	56	–	–	–
2006	"No Angel"	Supersized	10	–	12	–	–	–	–	–	–	–
2007	"Sunrise"	Forever	3	–	–	–	–	–	13	–	–	–
2007	"Tonight"	Forever	6	–	–	–	–	–	44	–	–	–
2008	"Forever"	Forever	7	–	–	–	–	–	91	–	–	–
2008	"Race"	Forever	18	–	10	–	–	–	–	–	–	–
2009	"Blackout"	Nomansland	1	67	–	–	–	–	84	–	–	–
2009	"Guilty"	Forever	Canadian digital single only									
2010	"Storm"	Nomansland	1	7	3	–	–	–	–	–	–	–
2010	"Chasing the Wind"	Nomansland	10	–	17	–	–	–	–	–	–	–
2011	"Fire"	Nomansland	5	–	–	–	–	–	–	–	–	–
2011	"Shadow"	Nomansland	42	–	–	–	–	–	–	–	–	–
2011	"I'll Be There (La Vache)"	15: The Very Best Of	6	86	–	–	–	–	–	–	–	–
2012	"Miracle"	Undercover	16	–	–	–	–	–	–	–	–	–
2013	"Last Night a D.J. Saved My Life"	Undercover	3	32	–	–	48	–	–	–	–	–
2013	"Sweet Child o' Mine"	Undercover	5	–	–	–	–	–	–	–	–	–
2013	"Imagination"	Undercover	3	–	–	–	–	–	–	–	–	–
2014	"Don't Say Goodbye"		7	–	–	–	–	–	–	–	–	–
2025	"Unstoppable"		2	–	–	–	–	–	–	–	–	–
2026	"Medicine"		17	–	–	–	–	–	–	–	–	–
2026	"Why Wait for the Weekend"		41	–	–	–	–	–	–	–	–	–

== Filmography ==
=== Music videos ===
Year	Title	Director
1997	"La Vache"	Caswell Coggins
1997	"Free Your Mind"	Caswell Coggins
1998	"Inside of Me"	Caswell Coggins
1999	"Oceans"	Steven Buyse
2000	"Land of the Living"	Filip Vandueren
2001	"Walk on Water"	Frank Schneider
2001	"Livin' a Lie"	Peter van Eyndt
2001	"Never Again"	Peter van Eyndt
2001	"Wide Awake"	Peter van Eyndt
2002	"Walk on Water"	Stuart Fryer
2002	"In My Eyes"	Damian Bromley
2002	"Land of the Living"	Andreas Tibblin
2002	"Sleepwalker"	Peter van Eyndt
2002	"Breathe Without You"	Peter van Eyndt
2003	"Time"	Peter van Eyndt
2003	"The Sun Always Shines on T.V."	Alex Diezinger
2004	"I Don't Care"	Raf Verbeemen
2004	"Whisper"	Peter van Eyndt
2005	"Blind"	Peter van Eyndt
2005	"Go to Hell"	—
2006	"Tainted Love"	The Black Sheep
2006	"Run"	Peter van Eyndt
2006	"No Angel"	Peter van Eyndt
2007	"Sunrise"	Peter van Eyndt
2007	"Tonight"	Peter van Eyndt
2008	"Forever"	Alex Diezinger
2008	"Race"	—
2009	"Blackout"	Peter van Eyndt
2010	"Storm"	Peter van Eyndt
2010	"Chasing the Wind"	—
2011	"Fire"	—
2011	"Shadow"	—
2012	"Miracle"	—
2013	"Last Night a DJ Saved My Life"	—
2013	"La Vache 2013"	—

=== DVDs ===
Year	Title	Notes	BEL DVD Chart
2004	Milk Inc. - The DVD	Acoustic sessions and a collection of Music Videos.	3
2006	Milk Inc. - Supersized	Contains footage of a concert.	4
2008	Milk Inc. - Forever in Sportpaleis	Footage of a Concert in Sportpaleis.	1

== Concerts in AFAS Dome (Sportpaleis) ==
Year	Title	Date
2006	Supersized	Saturday 30 September 2006
2007	Supersized 2	Friday 29 September 2007; Saturday 30 September 2007
2008	Forever	Friday 26 September 2008; Saturday 27 September 2008; Friday 3 October 2008; Friday 10 October 2008; Friday 17 October 2008; Saturday 18 October 2008
2009	Blackout	Friday 25 September 2009; Saturday 26 September 2009; Thursday 1 October 2009; Friday 2 October 2009; Saturday 3 October 2009; Friday 9 October 2009
2010	Eclipse	Fri 24 September 2010; Sat 25 September 2010; Fri 1 October 2010; Sat 2 October 2010; Fri 8 October 2010
2011	15	Friday 23 September 2011; Saturday 24 September 2011; Saturday 1 October 2011
2012	Miracle	Friday 12 October 2012; Saturday 13 October 2012
2013	Milkfest	Saturday 19 October 2013
2024	Regi vs Milk Inc.	Friday 18 October 2024; Saturday 19 October 2024; Saturday 2 November 2024; Sunday 3 November 2024; Friday 8 November 2024; Saturday 9 November 2024; Sunday 10 November 2024
2025	Unstoppable - Regi, Linda & Friends	Friday 24 October 2025; Saturday 25 October 2025
2026	Forever	Friday 23 October 2026; Saturday 24 October 2026

== Awards ==
Year	Award
2010	MIA Award – Beste Dance/Elektro
2009	MIA Award – Beste Dance/Elektro; Kids Awards 2009; TMF Awards Belgium – Best Dance Act National; TMF Awards Belgium – Best Live Act National
2008	MIA Award – Beste Dance/Elektro; TMF Awards Belgium – Best Dance Act National; TMF Awards Belgium – Best Live Act National; TMF Awards Belgium – Best Album National
2007	TMF Awards Belgium – Best Dance Act National
2006	TMF Awards Belgium – Best Dance Act National
2005	TMF Awards Belgium – Best Dance Act National; BelgaDance Awards Belgium – Best Producer Regi Penxten
2004	TMF Awards Belgium – Best Dance Act National; TMF Awards Belgium – Life Time Achievement
2003	TMF Awards Belgium – Best Dance Act National
2002	TMF Awards Belgium – Best Dance Act National
2001	Hitkrant The Netherlands – Best International Artists; Hitkrant The Netherlands – Best International Single "Walk on Water"; TMF Awards The Netherlands – Best Dance Act International; TMF Awards Belgium – Best Dance Act National; TMF Awards Belgium – Best Video "Never Again"
2000	Top Radio Awards Belgium – Best Vocalist Ann Vervoort; Radio Donna Awards Belgium – Best Holidaysong of the year "Oceans"; TMF Awards Belgium – Best Single National "Walk on Water"
1999	Radio Donna Awards Belgium – Peper Award "In My Eyes"; Move X Dance Awards Belgium – Best Dance Single "In My Eyes"; TMF Awards Belgium – Best Dance Act National
