= Regi Penxten =

Belgian DJ and record producer (born 1976)

Regi
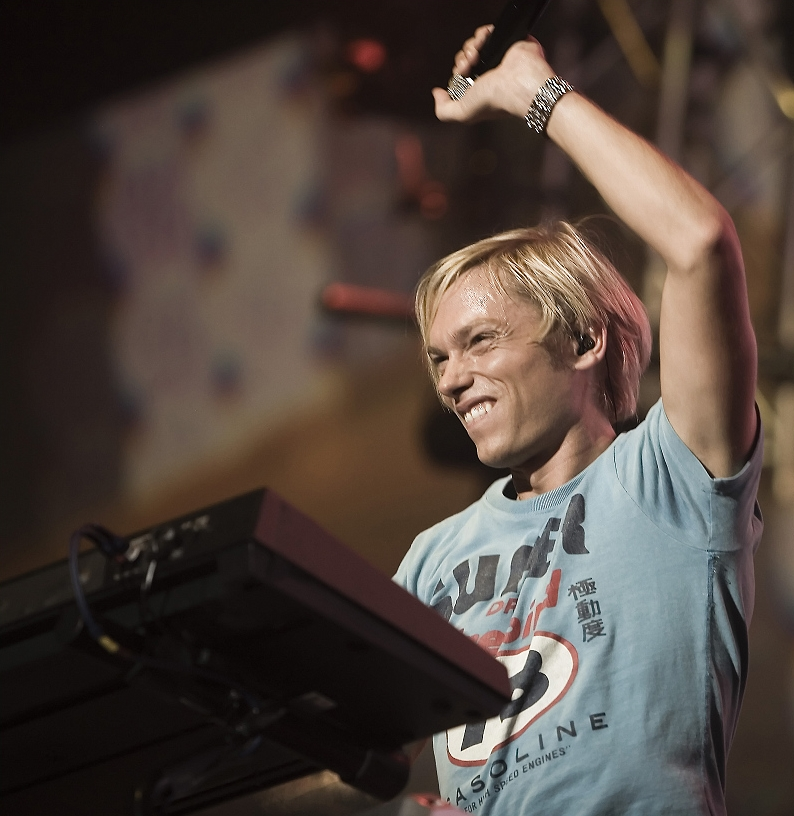
- Penxten in 2008

Background information
- Born: Reginald Paul Stefan Penxten; 4 March 1976 (age 50); Hasselt, Belgium
- Occupations: DJ, record producer, songwriter
- Website: www.regipenxten.be

Regi Penxten (born Reginald Paul Stefan Penxten on 4 March 1976) is a Belgian DJ and record producer of many Eurodance and trance projects in Belgium, including Milk Inc. and Sylver.

Better known by his mononym Regi, he has released three solo albums, which all reached the top ten of the Belgian album charts: Best Of (2005), Registrated (2007) and Registrated 2 (2010). Regi also had a number of charting singles in the Belgian Ultratop charts and two charting in the Netherlands.

== Career ==
At the end of 2007, he released his first solo-album, REGIstrated, which received a golden record before its release. The first produced was the song "Turn the Tide" in 2000.

As one of the main members of Milk Inc., he has had a further 27 hit singles in the Ultratop, 22 of them inside the top ten, with four number 1 singles. Their seven albums also all charted, with Forever and Nomansland reaching number 1.

As producer and co-songwriter of Sylver, he has had a further 22 charting hits, including 10 top ten hits, one of which reached the number 1 spot. 5 of the 6 charting albums also reached the top 10, with the 2010 compilation topping the charts. They have so far sold more than 1.5 million CDs.

== Discography ==
(For discography with Milk Inc., see their page)
(For discography of Sylver that Regi Penxten produced, see their page)

=== Studio albums ===
| Year | Album | Peak positions | Certification |
| Year | Album | BEL (Fl) | Certification |
|---|---|---|---|
| 2005 | The Best Of | 8 | |
| 2007 | REGIstrated | 2 | Gold |
| 2010 | REGIstrated 2 | 1 | Gold |
| 2015 | Voices | 1 | |
| 2020 | Vergeet De Tijd | 3 | |
| 2023 | The Return | 4 | |

=== Live albums ===
| Year | Album |
|---|---|
| 2008 | Live in Antwerp |
| 2009 | Live in Hasselt |

=== Mixtapes ===
- 2005: Regi in the Mix 1
- 2006: Regi in the Mix 2
- 2006: Regi in the Mix 3
- 2007: Regi in the Mix 4
- 2007: Registrated: The Jump Remixes
- 2008: Regi in the Mix 5
- 2008: Regi in the Mix 6
- 2009: Regi in the Mix 7
- 2009: Regi in the Mix 8
- 2010: Regi in the Mix 9
- 2011: Regi in the Mix 10
- 2011: Regi in the Mix 11
- 2012: Regi in the Mix 12
- 2012: Regi in the Mix 13
- 2013: Regi in the Mix 14
- 2014: Regi in the Mix 15
- 2014: Regi in the Mix Ultimate

=== Singles ===
| Year | Title | Peak positions | | Album |
| Year | Title | BEL (Fl) | NED Single Top 100 | Album |
|---|---|---|---|---|
| 2005 | "No Music" | 6 | – | Registrated |
| 2007 | "I Fail" (Regi & Scala) | 5 | 37 | Registrated |
| 2007 | "AAA Anthem" (Regi & BP) | 4 | – | Registrated |
| 2008 | "Punish" (Regi & Koen Buyse) | 9 | 37 | Registrated |
| 2008 | "Night and Day" (Regi & Tom Helsen) | 4 | – | Registrated |
| 2009 | "Loaded Gun" (Regi & Tyler) | 11 | – | Registrated 2 |
| 2010 | "Hang On" (Regi & Stan Van Samang) | 10 | – | Registrated 2 |
| 2010 | "Take It Off" (Regi & Kaya Jones) | 13 | – | Registrated 2 |
| 2010 | "Runaway" (Regi & Tyler) | 5 (Ultratip) | – | Registrated 2 |
| 2011 | "We Be Hot" (Regi & Turbo B feat. Ameerah) | 9 | – | Registrated 2 |
| 2012 | "Momentum" (Dimitri Vegas & Like Mike & Regi) | 7 | – | Non-album single |
| 2014 | "Reckless" (Regi feat. Moya) | 3 | – | Voices |
| 2014 | "Invincible" (Regi feat. Moya) | 3 | – | Non-album single |
| 2015 | "The Party Is Over" (Regi and Sem Thomasson feat. LX) | 49 | – | Voices |
| 2015 | "Elegantly Wasted" (Regi & Scala) | 14 | – | Voices |
| 2016 | "Should Have Been There" | 34 | – | Voices |
| 2017 | "Where Did You Go (Summer Love)" | 1 | – | Vergeet De Tijd |
| 2017 | "You Have a Heart" (Regi & OT) | 3 | – | Non-album single |
| 2018 | "Ellie" (featuring Jake Reese) | 1 | – | Vergeet De Tijd |
| 2018 | "Ordinary" (featuring Milo Meskens) | 4 | – | Vergeet De Tijd |
| 2019 | "Summer Life" (featuring Jake Reese and OT) | 5 | – | Vergeet De Tijd |
| 2019 | "Rebel" (with Jebroer) | 85 | – | Vergeet De Tijd |
| 2020 | "Kom wat dichterbij" (featuring Jake Reese and OT) | 1 | – | Vergeet De Tijd |
| 2020 | "Zo ver weg" (featuring Jake Reese and OT) | 26 | – | Vergeet De Tijd |
| 2020 | "Vergeet de tijd" (featuring Camille) | 4 | – | Vergeet De Tijd |
| 2020 | "Vechter" (featuring Camille) | 7 | – | Non-album singles |
| 2021 | "De wereld draait voor jou" (with Niels Destadsbader) | 1 | – | Non-album singles |
| 2021 | "Duizend sterren" (with Pauline) | 12 | – | Non-album singles |
| 2021 | "Lost Without You" (with Pauline) | 34 | – | Non-album singles |
| 2022 | "Zwaartekracht" (with Emma Heesters) | 7 | – | Non-album singles |
| 2022 | "Als ik mezelf verlies" (featuring Arno and Melanie) | 9 | – | Non-album singles |
| 2022 | "Horen, zien en zwijgen" (featuring Maxine) | 9 | – | Non-album singles |
| 2025 | "You'll Never Let Me Down" (with Teddy Bee) | 11 | – | Non-album singles |
| 2026 | "Bound to Be" (with Laura Tesoro) | 18 | – | Non-album singles |

=== Featured in ===
| Year | Single | Peak positions | |
| Year | Single | BEL (Fl) | NED Single Top 100 |
|---|---|---|---|
| 2004 | "Lonely" (Trancelucent feat. Regi) | 3 | – |
| 2012 | "Our Love" (Stereo Palma vs. Regi feat. Craig David) | 16 | – |

=== Other charted songs ===
List of other charted songs, with chart positions, showing year released and album name
| Title | Year | Peaks | Album |
| Title | Year | BEL (Fl) | Album |
|---|---|---|---|
| "They Don't Know" (with OT) | 2020 | 59 | Vergeet De Tijd |

== Filmography ==
- De Slimste Mens ter Wereld (2008) – as himself
- F.C. De Kampioenen (2011) – as himself
- Familie (2011) – as himself
- The Voice van Vlaanderen (2014) – coach
- Tegen de sterren op (2014) – as himself
- The Voice Kids (2014) – coach
- D5R: de film (2017) – as himself
- Liefde voor muziek (2020) – participant
- De Zomer van (2020) – as himself
