= Devil in a New Dress =

Promotional single by Kanye West featuring Rick Ross

from the album My Beautiful Dark Twisted Fantasy
- Released: September 3, 2010
- Recorded: 2010
- Genre: Alternative hip-hop; rap rock; chipmunk soul; mafioso rap
- Length: 2:52 (Single): 5:52 (Album)
- Label: Roc-A-Fella; Def Jam
- Songwriters: Kanye West; Mike Dean; Roosevelt Harrell; William Roberts; Malik Jones; Gerry Goffin; Carole King
- Producers: Bink; Dean

"Devil in a New Dress" is a song by American hip-hop recording artist and rapper Kanye West from his fifth studio album, My Beautiful Dark Twisted Fantasy (2010). Originally released through West's GOOD Fridays initiative, a weekly free music giveaway started by the rapper to promote My Beautiful Dark Twisted Fantasy, it later appeared on the album with an added guitar solo by producer Mike Dean and an additional guest verse featuring rapper Rick Ross. "Devil in a New Dress" was produced by Bink!, and is the only song on the album not to be produced by West.

The song samples Smokey Robinson's slow jam recording "Will You Love Me Tomorrow?", and is themed lyrically to lust and heartache. Both the topics of love and religion serve as the main inspiration to the song. The song received acclaim from music critics, who praised the delivery of West's verse, the lush production and the guest appearance by Ross. It has been remixed by several musicians, such as J. Cole, Jay Electronica and Young Chris. Ross promoted the song releasing a music video in which he showcased his verse. The song was prominently featured in West's short film Runaway during a dinner room sequence. It charted on the South Korean Gaon Chart at position 99.

== Background ==
"Devil in a New Dress" was first released on September 3, 2010, and was the fourth song to be featured as a part of Kanye West's GOOD Fridays, a music giveaway that provided free MP3 downloads every week. The intention was to release a free new song every Friday for a few months. The weekly tracks generally featured various rappers from his label, GOOD Music, as well as other artists that he usually collaborated with. Though "Devil in a New Dress" was the fourth GOOD Fridays song released, it was the second completely original track premiered. During its initial release, Consequence of Sound reported, "the Chicago-based rapper has shared Devil in a New Dress, a song which is rumoured to be included on West’s still untitled fifth studio album. Compared to his other recent joints, the track is rather minimal in nature. It clocks in at less than three minutes and features no guest contributors. In fact, it’s the accompanying beat which actually makes the post-midnight release worth our time." The song was rumoured to be featured on West's new album, appearing on a leaked tracklist. It was later confirmed to appear on the album, albeit as a vastly different version. It was released digitally following the release of the album.

=== Recording ===
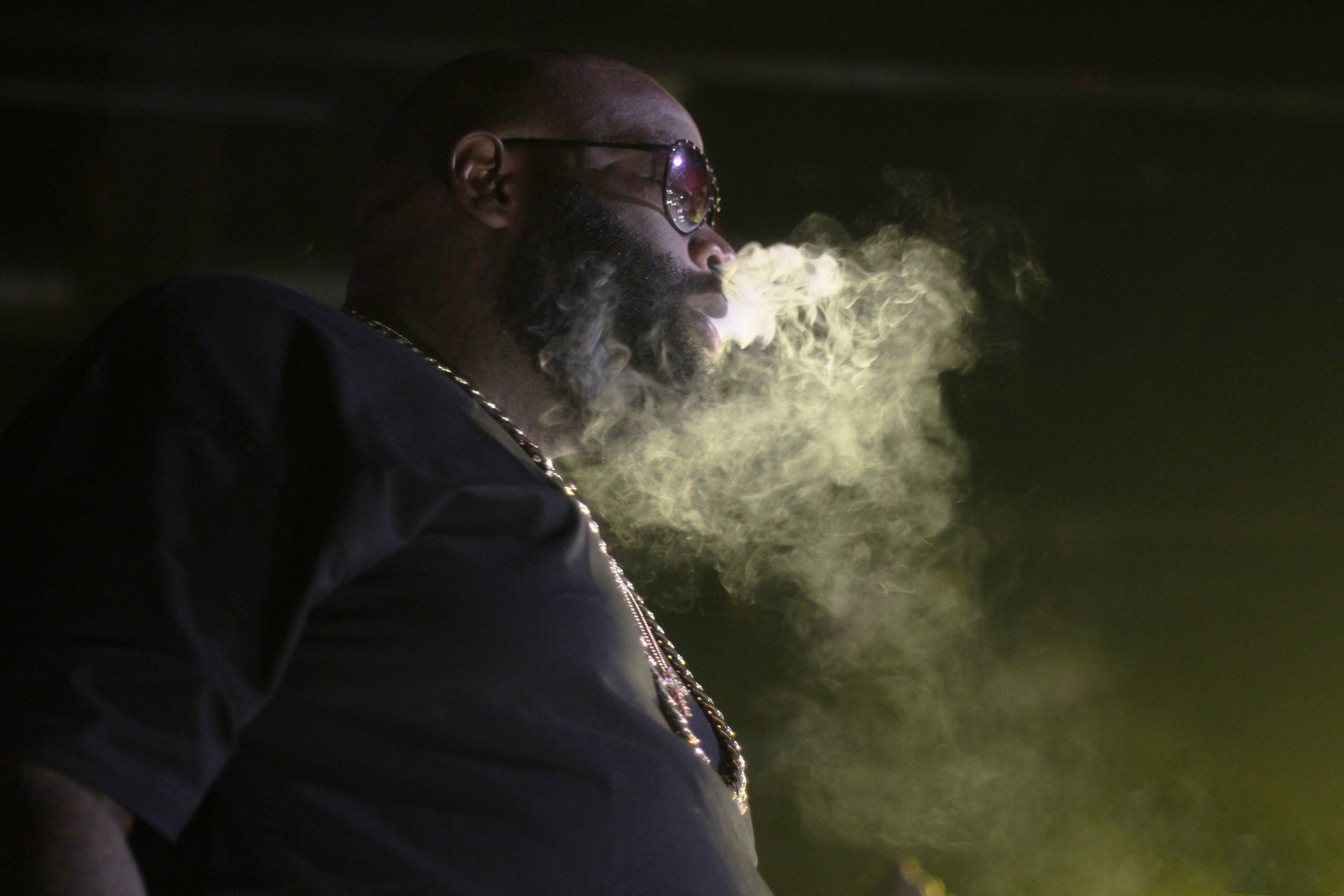
Rick Ross recorded his verse for "Devil in a New Dress" within a very close proximity from when the album had to be turned in to the record label.

Following some media controversies, West chose to record the majority of his fifth studio album My Beautiful Dark Twisted Fantasy in a reclusive manner in Oahu, Hawaii. Like the majority of the album, "Devil in a New Dress" was also composed in Oahu. Rapper Rick Ross was invited to Hawaii to work with West because West was set to produce the song "Live Fast, Die Young", which appeared on Teflon Don, an album by Ross. Ross was not initially intended to be featured on West's album, however, he walked in while West was recording the track, "Monster". Ross was impressed with what he heard and asked if he could deliver an intro to the song. West enjoyed what Ross brought to the song and invited him back to his studio during the final stages of the album, to record a guest verse on "Devil in a New Dress". According to Ross, the verse was added the day before the album had to be turned into the record label. In an interview with MTV discussing the composition of the song, Ross commented:

I got a call, they wanted me to be a part of that record. [...] It was actually the last day before Kanye had to turn the record in, and I think that pressure just made it that much more special to me. So I just sat there, approached the record openly and as straightforward as I could. When I laid the verse, 30 minutes later, I was extremely happy. I sent it to him, and he was too. I think it was one of the dopest verses I did this year."

Ross favorably compared the recording sessions to his past in school. He mused, "it's like everybody is a student: You walk into a session, and it's all about the subject at hand." The remastered album version featured a new guitar solo, composed by producer Bink!. Bink! is most famous for his contributions to Jay-Z's album, The Blueprint, which has been described as a "pioneering album" by Pitchfork Media's Ryan Dombal and was West's big break as a producer. West and Bink! originally became friends while producing another Jay-Z album, The Dynasty: Roc La Familia in the late 1990s. Bink! described that the two producers quickly developed a mutual respect for each other. Bink! commented on the first time he showed the composition to West, saying "the reaction I got from him after I played the beat for the first time was real intense." Immediately Bink! knew that West was going to use the production. Initially, he wasn't sure whether or how West was going to use the song for his album, and expressed surprise that West dropped the song as a free track prior to the album's release.

== Composition ==
"Devil in a New Dress"
A 30 second sample of "Devil in a New Dress" containing numerous religious references and metaphors concerning break-ups.

The song is 5 minutes, 52 seconds long, though the originally released version was less than 3 minutes. The song is built on a soulful sample of Smokey Robinson's recording "Will You Still Love Me Tomorrow", with an extended guitar solo. The song features a synth-heavy breakdown, complete with guitar riffs, before Ross arrives, spitting: "I never needed acceptance from all you outsiders/ Had cyphers with Yeezy before his mouth wired/ Before his jaw shattered, climbing up the lord's ladder/ We still speeding, running signs like they don't matter." It is the only album track without production by West, but features his characteristic style of manipulating the pitch and tempo of classic soul samples. West raps in a flow similar to that of rapper Nas, commenting about the women who have wronged him in the past and his struggles with religion. Ann Powers of Los Angeles Times commented that the track reveals West's true feelings on women;

His tormenters are usually untrustworthy temptresses, though occasionally they're authority figures who judge him as a criminal trespasser or a cultural arriviste. And songs such as the porno fantasy "Hell of a Life" and the siren-slaying "Devil in a New Dress" (featuring the consummately macho Ross) revive familiar mythologies about women — that they're monsters, killers, fallen angels — in language vibrant enough to fully revive these old stereotypes.

MTV stated that "'Dress' continues [Kanye's] return to the soulful old-school sounds he championed in his early work" and that "West works an easy flow over the midtempo joint replete with feathery falsetto backing vocals an overall buttery '70s feel. Despite the laidback groove, West shows his vulnerable side, as he laments being loved and left." "Devil in a New Dress" contains lyrics about lust and heartache, with sexual and religious imagery described by one critic as "part bedroom allure, part angelic prayer". Rap-Up called it a "female-focused song" and a "soulful track, boasting a slow-rolling beat with a haunting vocal sample.” Alex Koening of Knightnews wrote "over piano flourishes and a scintillating string section contain some of the funniest tongue-in-cheek lyrics about women Kanye ever managed: 'I hit the Jamaican spot, at the bar, take a seat/ I ordered the jerk, she said you are what you eat.' Kanye might be on his quest for love, but he still isn’t able to tolerate gold-digging girls who are only after his cash: 'And outta all the colors that are still up the skies/ You got green on your mind, I can see it in your eyes.'"

== Reception ==
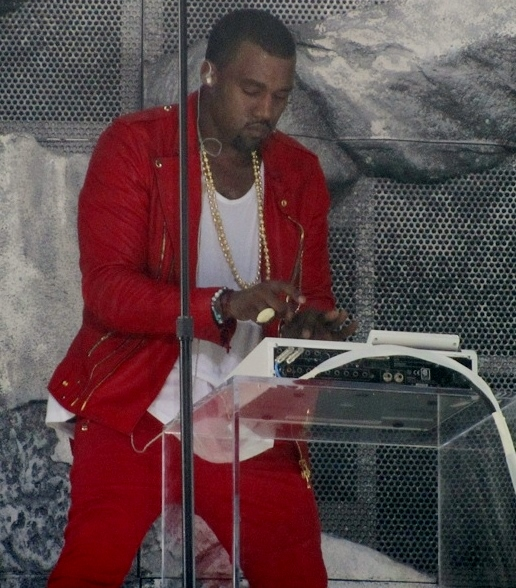
Even though West was not a credited producer on the track, the composition style of "Devil in a New Dress" was compared favorably to his own.

"Devil in a New Dress" has received widespread acclaim from music critics, and was noted for its soulful production, as well as the verse provided by Ross. It was considered a highlight of My Beautiful Dark Twisted Fantasy and Kanye's career, and has been described as "perhaps the easiest song to like on first listen." It was compared favorably to songs from West's debut studio album The College Dropout by Jon Caramanica of The New York Times. Channing Freeman of Sputnikmusic felt that the track brought out the best in Ross. Slant Magazine viewed that on "Devil in a New Dress", West perfected the sampling style he helped make popular, and commented that West "manipulates the pitch and tempo of Smokey Robinson's 'Will You Love Me Tomorrow?' until it crawls luxuriantly out of the speakers like wine poured in slow motion. It's a gorgeous slow burner that turns tragic in its third act, as Kanye's rhymes swap lust for heartache before distorted guitar lines and a muscular verse from Rick Ross close it out".

Chicago Sun-Times praised West's vocal delivery, saying "he rips more hard raps on 'Devil in a New Dress' -- chuckling through lines like, 'We love Jesus / but you done learned a lot from Satan / We ain't married / but tonight I need some consummation,' and later chewing through an impersonation of a preacher, 'Say-tan! Say-tan! Say-tan!'—all over a fluttery, high, quiet-storm soul vocal that's part bedroom allure, part angelic prayer." MTV stated "West's breezy GOOD Fridays release gets a wintertime tune-up with Ross riding shotgun. The Miami Don's majestic contribution comes with a revamped breakdown setting up his slick boats. Still, Yeezy's verse holds up over the Boss's even with the refinement." Dan Vidal of URB stated Ross brought his best to the track, writing that he "steps his tired old coke-rhymes up to intense lyrical portraits on the final version of 'Devil In A New Dress'." Stereogum's Amrit Singh described the production style as a throwback to vintage hip-hop beats, and praised West's extended use of metaphors on the track. AbsolutePunk's Drew Beringer cited the track as an example of West's "penchant for soul", calling the track excellent. AllMusic's Andy Kellman also described the beat as a "throwback soul production", writing that it was "provided by the Smokey Robinson-sampling Bink, it’s as gorgeous as any of West’s own early work, yet it’s marred by an aimless instrumental stretch, roughly 90 seconds in length, that involves some incongruent electric guitar flame-out."

The Village Voice's Sean Fennessey commented that the production by Bink! was gorgeous in nature. He compared the original three-minute long version of the song to the one on the album, writing that the original "was affecting, funny (“I ordered the jerk, she said 'You are what you eat.'”) and soulful—a touch of the old Ye. And just three minutes long. But the album version is something bigger, with a magisterial guest verse from Rick Ross (appearing twice here) that comes after an odd but sumptuous acid-jazz breakdown." Craig Jenkins of Prefix Music opined that "Bink’s beat for 'Devil in a New Dress' peters out midway through, and a live band plays a sultry, emotive take on that beat." Andrew Barber of Complex stated that for the people disappointed in the briefness of the verses provided by Ross on "Monster", this track more than makes up for it. Barber favorably compared the track to the style of West's older songs, and commented that it showcased West's "softer, more vulnerable side, opening up about a woman."

== Promotion ==
=== Visuals ===
Rick Ross in the "Devil in a New Dress" music video

The song appears in West's short film Runaway, an extended 35-minute-long music video which features a majority of the tracks featured on My Beautiful Dark Twisted Fantasy. The song is played halfway through the short during the introduction to the dinner party sequence. Ross had a music video directed containing his portion of the song, which was released on January 27, 2011. According to Rap Radar, "Kanye couldn’t make it, so Ross took matters into his own hands and shot a video for his portion of 'Devil In A New Dress' from My Beautiful Dark Twisted Fantasy.

Anthony Osel of Complex wrote that "Rick Ross gives us visuals for just about every freestyle, verse and song he's ever recorded. Rozay dropped off a Spiff TV-directed video for "Devil In A New Dress" from Kanye's My Beautiful Dark Twisted Fantasy. It's him smoking a blunt while cruising the streets of Toronto in the back seat of his 62S Maybach glancing out the window. Standard, but awesome, clip from Ross." Ross would perform the song during his live concerts and it has even become a mainstay of his live sets. During a live performance on October 23, 2010, in New York City, West joined Ross and performed it along with "Monster".

=== Covers ===
"Villematic"
A 30-second sample of J. Cole's "Villematic", which samples the album version of "Devil in a New Dress", initially performed by West and Ross.

The song has been frequently covered and remixed by several notable rappers. Roc Nation's Jay Electronica recorded his own freestyle and had a music video created for his version. Grammy nominated Young Chris did a freestyle over the original version of the song. Fiend released a freestyle onto his mixtape Life Behind Limo Tint and a filmed a music video. Canadian native Shad performed a freestyle of the song during a concert. Fabolous used the song's instrumental to record "Wolves In Sheeps Clothing" which was featured on mix-tape The S.O.U.L. Tape. He directed a music video to promote the song. JJ Demon recorded his own song using the instrumental. In addition, J. Cole performed a freestyle over the song, which he had stated was a tribute to West, writing “That beat is incredible, shout out to Yeezy. Much Love.” The song, titled "Villematic" was featured on his Friday Night Lights mixtape. AllHipHop praised his version, saying "'Villematic', '2 Face', and 'Higher' are all songs which make up a strong midsection – it is easy to become lost in this mixtape."

== Chart position ==
Chart (2011)	Peak position
South Korean Gaon Chart	99

== Certifications ==
Region	Certification	Certified units/sales
Denmark (IFPI Danmark)	Gold	45,000^{‡}
New Zealand (RMNZ)	Platinum	30,000^{‡}
United Kingdom (BPI)	Gold	400,000^{‡}
United States (RIAA)	3× Platinum	3,000,000^{‡}
^{‡} Sales+streaming figures based on certification alone.
