= So Appalled =

2010 promotional single by Kanye West

Promotional single by Kanye West featuring Jay-Z, Pusha T, Cyhi the Prynce, Swizz Beatz and RZA

from the album My Beautiful Dark Twisted Fantasy
- Released: September 24, 2010
- Recorded: 2009–10
- Genre: Hip-hop
- Length: 6:38
- Label: Roc-A-Fella; Def Jam
- Songwriters: Kanye West; Ernest Wilson; Mike Dean; Shawn Carter; Terrence Thornton; Cydel Young; Kaseem Dean; Robert Diggs; Manfred Mann
- Producers: Kanye West; No I.D.; Mike Dean

"So Appalled" is a song by American rapper Kanye West from his fifth studio album, My Beautiful Dark Twisted Fantasy (2010). The song was produced by West, along with No I.D. and Mike Dean, and features verses by Jay-Z, Cyhi the Prynce, Pusha T, Swizz Beatz, and RZA respectively, who all receive writing credits. Lyrically, the song explores topics such as the troubles produced from being famous, social concerns and features numerous pop culture references.

The posse cut received mostly positive reviews from music critics, with West and Jay-Z's verses commonly being cited as the highlights. Critics generally praised the production of the song. Originally, the song was released in an unmastered form through West's GOOD Friday initiative, a weekly free music giveaway started by the rapper to promote the album. Following this, "So Appalled" made its way onto My Beautiful Dark Twisted Fantasy with the addition of an extended verse. "So Appalled" charted on the Billboard Bubbling Under R&B/Hip-Hop Singles singles chart. West performed the song with Jay-Z at their Watch the Throne Tour and with Pusha T on his own tour.

== Background ==
"So Appalled" was first released on September 24, 2010, and was the seventh song to be featured on West's GOOD Fridays, a music giveaway that provided free MP3 downloads every week. It was originally believed to be a song for West and Jay-Z's collaborative album Watch the Throne, but it was later confirmed not to be. The song would later find its way onto West's fifth studio album, My Beautiful Dark Twisted Fantasy along with two other GOOD Friday songs. The version on the album was altered production-wise and was longer, and featured a sample of the Manfred Mann's Earth Band's song "You Are – I Am". The song was released with two covers, one with a famous photo of a model vomiting red nail polish, taken by Guy Bourdin; and the other containing the same image, with dimmed lighting and obscured by thick red letters. Before its release the song was leaked online and was nearly scrapped.

=== Recording ===
The majority of My Beautiful Dark Twisted Fantasy, including "So Appalled", was recorded in Oahu, Hawaii. Following several media controversies, West decided to record his next album in a reclusive manner only working with artists he considered himself familiar with. Amongst the various artists invited down to Hawaii to record songs for the album was Pusha T, a rapper known for the hip-hop duo Clipse. While in Hawaii, Pusha-T commented that the very first thing he recorded was his verse for "So Appalled". He favorably compared recording with West with another producer he was used to working with, Pharrell Williams, commenting that he enjoyed how the process was more of a canvas.

When working with other producers usually a majority of the track was already done by the time he got to the recording studio, but with West, the process was more creative in nature. Pusha described the recording process with West as a "roller coast" and stated that he never knew what to expect while working with the producer. Upon hearing the production of the song, Pusha-T commented that it was so good it persuaded him to write a particularly inspired verse. On the production of "So Appalled", he said "it's Kanye, the beat brings the ghost out of you." The rapper described his verse as "self-explanatory" and stated that it was one of his favorite of his career. Pusha T called his verse "his personal favorite" and that the track was originally supposed to be just him and Kanye. When the song was finished, Pusha-T was so impressed with the track that he argued with West to include it on his album, stating that the song was so good it didn't matter whether or not it had leaked. He commented;

"I had already raved over the record because it leaked. I was like listen, there is no way this cant [sic] be on your album, you'd have to be crazy. He was like 'Really, you think so?' I was like c'mon man we got to stop treating rap like oh it came out it's dead. When it's good, we have to make people love it and digest it. We can't treat this like mixtape throwaways like everybody else does. Everybody else does half-ass music. So what people don't know is that what Kanye did during that album is literally, I walked into the studio and I had the pick of 17 records and he was like do what you want to do to any of these, do what you like."

One of the producers and guest appearances on the song is RZA, frontman of the hip-hop group Wu-Tang Clan. RZA spoke positively of West, viewing that he embodied the mentality of the Wu-Tang Clan. RZA sent several beats to West, including some that he cited as being edgy, because he felt that West was the type who could work well on more forceful production, including the brooding beat for "So Appalled". The song was nearly featured on Last Train to Paris, a studio album by Diddy. According to another producer on the song, No I.D., it was offered to both Jay-Z and Diddy before it leaked. West freestyled over the track for fun and found that he actually liked it enough to ultimately use it himself, stating that it would make a good group song. Cyhi the Prynce's verse only appeared on the song because he "tricked" West. Originally he was only supposed to deliver a quick hook, but at the time West was tired and let Cyhi record his verse alone. When West awoke and played back the tape, he was surprised to find that Cyhi had recorded an entire verse. Impressed with it, West decided to include it on the track anyway. The song reportedly offended M.C. Hammer, who Jay-Z references on the line "I spent another 30 / Cause unlike Hammer 30 million can't hurt me".

== Composition ==
"So Appalled"
A 30 second sample of "So Appalled" which features Kanye West's verse over the droning, brooding composition.

"So Appalled" has been described as an epic posse cut featuring a large roster of performers. West uses his verse to address his past critics and comment on his status as a celebrity. West's performance on the song is notably intense, forcefully rapping lines such as "we above the law, we don't give a fuck 'bout y'all / I got dogs that'll chew a fucking hole through the wall." Swizz Beatz sets the tone of the song using several ad-libs such as "one hand in the air, if you don't really care" and the line "this shit is fucking ridiculous" which is repeated several times throughout the song, delivered by nearly every rapper. The second verse is delivered by Jay-Z, who spends the majority of his verse deconstructing the hate that surrounds fame and poses the question, "would you rather be underpaid or overrated?" Jay-Z comments on how a career in the music industry creates many opponents. The third verse is delivered by Pusha T, who muses on cocaine dealing.

The song contains numerous pop culture references, including The Dark Knight, the breakfast cereal Cheerios, the business figure and future United States President, Donald Trump, rapper M.C. Hammer and "We Major", a song from West's album Late Registration. On the unconventional structure of the song, Sputnikmusic's Channing Freeman said that verses were "very lengthy – Kanye appears within the first minute and then drops out for good – but the droning beat is so mesmerizing that it's barely even noticeable." Andy Gill of The Independent explained the use of several guest appearances, writing "Kanye has never been short on ambition or ego, so it's no surprise he should have his guests (including such hip-hop luminaries as Jay-Z, Swizz Beats and RZA) queue up on "So Appalled" to confirm in turn how 'this shit is fucking ridiculous'".

== Reception ==
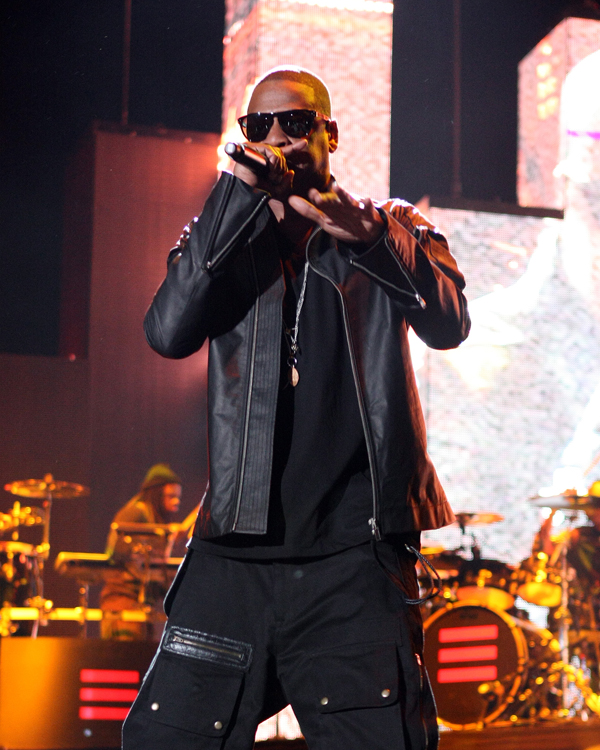
Jay-Z was cited by several critics as the rapper who gave the best verse on "So Appalled".

"So Appalled" received mostly favorable reviews from contemporary critics. David Browne of Time wrote that he felt that the track was "built on rumbling tanks of pianos and strings" and that it sounded as if West was "marching into the apocalypse." David Amidon of PopMatters compared the production to West's album Late Registration which found West "inviting his friend Jon Brion to impart slices of film scoring to the odds and ends of his tracks". He commented that much like every song on My Beautiful Dark Twisted Fantasy, the song "contains an underscore as ambitious as the beats upfront", concluding that tracks "Hell of a Life" and "So Appalled" alone "carry enough auditory sugar to make listening to this album on any regular sort of listening device almost a fool's errand."

Jayson Rodriguez of MTV praised the song, reporting "this all-star cipher is a backpackers dream as Ye's GOOD Music soldiers fire away with resolve. But the Brooklyn icon, Jay-Z, steals the show with an edgy verse dismissing his critics with a 16 that's as pushy as a New Yorker during rush hour. Please, Hammer, stop replying." Slant Magazine's Cole Mathews thought that the song returned West to his hard rap origins, commenting "with the posse cuts 'Monster' and 'So Appalled', Kanye kicks out the two hardest rap tracks of his career." Becky Bain of Idolater described the song as a "dramatic, gloomy epic of a tune that has each artist taking turns at the mic." He expressed that trying to find Kanye's verse was "virtually a musical Where's Waldo". It was noted for its impressive roster of features and was described as "another Kanye West-helmed all-star collabo" by MTV's Hawuse Ziegbe. He noted that Cyhi managed to hold his own against several much more regarded rappers. Embling of Tiny Mix Tapes described the song as a super-sized cypher, stating that the track was packed with plenty of "shitalking" from the group of rappers.

Pitchfork's Tom Breihan criticized Cyhi's lyrical contributions to the song, stating "On the otherwise amazing Kanye track 'So Appalled', CyHi offers a black hole of a verse. His most memorable line ('If God had a iPod, I'd be on his playlist') mostly just raises questions. Like: Why does God's iPod only have one playlist?" IGN's Chad Grischow described the song as a star-studded banger, and cited Jay-Z's verse as the most notable. In addition, Grischow stated that the song was unfocused. Chris Martins of Spin reported that much like the track "Monster", the guest appearances on the song had the potential to be toned down. Chicago Sun-Times writer Thomas Conner cited the line "praise due to the most high, Allah / Praise due to the most fly, Prada" as an example of genius songwriting on West's part. The song charted at 14 on the Bubbling Under R&B/Hip-Hop Singles chart as reported by Billboard, however it only spent one week on the chart. The song also appeared on the South Korean Gaon Chart at number 95.

=== Reaction from M.C. Hammer ===
M.C. Hammer promised to release a track on October 31, 2010, in response to Jay-Z's "So Appalled" lyrics which he felt attacked him. Jay-Z raps a verse targeting Hammer about his financial dilemma in the 1990s. Within it Jay says: 'Hammer went broke so you know I'm more focused / I lost 30 mil' so I spent another 30 / 'Cause unlike Hammer 30 million can't hurt me'. Hammer addressed his displeasure about the diss on Twitter, claiming he would react to Jay-Z on Halloween.

Hammer released a sample of his "beef" with Jay-Z (a.k.a. 'Hell Boy' according to Hammer) in a brief teaser trailer called "Better Run Run" by 'King Hammer'. At one point, it was uncertain if his reaction would be a film video, a music video or a combination of both. Regardless, he claimed he would show evidence that 'Jigga worships the devil'. It's possible that Jay-Z was offended by an analogy Hammer was conveying in an earlier interview in response to "D.O.A. (Death of Auto-Tune)" on AllHipHop.

On November 1, Hammer's song and video titled "Better Run Run!" hit the web in retaliation to Jay-Z's September 2010 diss towards him. M.C. accuses Jay-Z of being in league (and in the studio) with Satan — and then Hammer defeats the devil and forces Jay to be baptized. Speaking on the video, Jacob O'Gara of Ethos Magazine wrote: "What's more likely is that this feud is the last chapter in the tragic cautionary tale of M.C. Hammer, a tale that serves as a warning to all present and future kings of hip-hop. Keep your balance on the pedestal and wear the crown strong or you'll have the Devil to pay."

In an interview with BBC's DJ Semtex, Jay said he didn't mean the verses as a personal attack. "I didn't know that [Hammer's financial status] wasn't on the table for discussion!" he said. "I didn't know I was the first person ever to say that..." He continued, "When I say things, I think people believe me so much that they take it a different way — it's, like, not rap anymore at that point. I say some great things about him in the book I have coming out [Decoded] — that's wasn't a cheap plug," he laughed. "He's gonna be embarrassed, I said some really great things about him and people's perception of him. But it is what it is, he took it that wrong way, and I didn't know I said anything wrong!"

== Legacy ==
The track was nightly performed by West and Jay-Z during their Watch the Throne Tour. Pusha T performs the song live during his own live sets. The song was one of the few songs on My Beautiful Dark Twisted Fantasy not to be featured on Runaway, a 35-minute music video directed by West set to music from the album.

== Personnel ==
- Produced by Kanye West and No I.D.
- Co-produced by Mike Dean
- Recorded by Andrew Dawson, Anthony Kilhoffer and Mike Dean at the Avex Recording Studio, Honolulu and Noah Goldstein & Pete Bischoff at Electric Lady Studios, NYC
- Engineered by Ken Lewis and Brent Kolatalo
- Mixed by Mike Dean at Electric Lady Studios, NYC
- Assistant Mix Engineers: Gaylord Holomalia, Christian Mochizuki & Pete Bischoff
- Keyboards: Mike Dean & Jeff Bhasker
- Cello: Chris "Hitchcock" Chorney
- Cello arrangement: Mike Dean

== Charts ==
Chart (2010)	Peak Position
US Bubbling Under R&B/Hip-Hop Singles (Billboard)	14
South Korean Gaon Chart	95

== Certifications ==
Region	Certification	Certified units/sales
United States (RIAA)	Gold	500,000^{‡}
^{‡} Sales+streaming figures based on certification alone.
