= Runaway (Kanye West song) =

2010 single by Kanye West featuring Pusha T

Single by Kanye West featuring Pusha T

from the album My Beautiful Dark Twisted Fantasy
- Released: October 4, 2010
- Recorded: 2010
- Studio: Avex, Honolulu
- Genre: Progressive rap
- Length: 9:07 (album version); 5:39 (single version)
- Label: Roc-A-Fella; Def Jam
- Songwriters: Kanye West; Emile Haynie; Jeff Bhasker; Terrence Thornton; Mike Dean; Malik Jones; Peter Phillips
- Producers: Kanye West; Emile Haynie; Jeff Bhasker; Mike Dean

Kanye West singles chronology
"Erase Me" (2010)	"Runaway" (2010)	"Monster" (2010)

Pusha T singles chronology
"Lose Your Life" (2008)	"Runaway" (2010)	"Trouble on My Mind" (2011)

Music videos
- "Runaway" (Video Version) on YouTube "Runaway" (Extended Video Version) on YouTube

Alternate cover
- The alternate artwork, as designed by George Condo. Used for a European CD single release.

"Runaway" is a song by American rapper Kanye West featuring fellow American rapper Pusha T. It was released on October 4, 2010, as the second single from the former's fifth studio album, My Beautiful Dark Twisted Fantasy (2010). The song was written by the artists alongside Emile Haynie, Jeff Bhasker, Mike Dean, and Malik Yusef, with the first three providing additional production. A progressive rap song with pop, R&B, and art rock elements, "Runaway" begins with an isolated piano melody that repeats one note. Lyrically, the song expresses West's thoughts on his failed relationships and his acceptance of the media's perception of him. Pusha T provides a second verse, which provides a harsher tone compared to West's heartfelt and melodic verse.

Before the song's premiere at the 2010 MTV Video Music Awards, "Runaway" generated substantial public interest due to its lyrical relation to West's interrupting of Taylor Swift at the 2009 MTV Video Music Awards. West's performance at its premiere received positive reviews. The song itself received universal acclaim from music critics and was listed amongst the best songs of the year by several publications, including MTV, Pitchfork, Rolling Stone, Complex, New York Post, amongst others. Critics praised the song for its emotional subject matter and ambitious production. The song quickly became one of the best-reviewed singles, with critics noting that the track solidified West's commercial comeback with the public. The song has since appeared on multiple decade-end and all-time lists as one of the greatest songs of all time, including at number 25 on Rolling Stone's list of The 500 Greatest Songs of All Time in 2021 and again in 2024.

"Runaway" debuted and peaked at number twelve on the Billboard Hot 100 and serves as the centerpiece of Runaway, a 35-minute short film featuring the majority of songs from My Beautiful Dark Twisted Fantasy. The song's nearly ten-minute music video features ballet dancers performing elaborate choreography. The music video received mostly positive reviews from music critics, who praised the scope of the video, the degree of creativity, and the production design. As of November 2026, the cut and extended versions of the music video have overall received over 252 million views on YouTube.

== Background ==
On September 13, 2009, West attended the 2009 MTV Video Music Awards. When singer Taylor Swift was awarded Best Female Video at the ceremony, West went on stage, stole the mic from Swift, and said, "Yo Taylor, I'm really happy for you, I'ma let you finish, but, Beyoncé had one of the best videos of all time! One of the best videos of all time!" West then shrugged and gave the mic back to Swift. The incident led to significant backlash against West, from tweets by celebrities to then U.S. President Barack Obama calling him a "jackass", along with the cancellation of West's upcoming tour Fame Kills, co-led with singer Lady Gaga. West apologized on his blog and during an appearance on The Jay Leno Show. Disgusted with the media response, he took a brief hiatus from recording, and later went on a self-imposed exile in Oahu, Hawaii that year to conceive My Beautiful Dark Twisted Fantasy (2010) at Avex Recording Studio Like the majority of My Beautiful Dark Twisted Fantasy, "Runaway" was produced there. Amongst the various artists invited down to Hawaii to record songs for the album was Pusha T, a rapper known for being in the hip-hop duo Clipse.

== Development and production ==
=== Writing ===
About West's portion of the song, he stated that he was interested in making a song that the average person could relate to, as he perceived himself as someone who identified with the average person. West mused that when writing the song, he intended some parts of the song as a double entendre. According to West, certain portions of the song can be interpreted in multiple ways. He explained that what may sound like commentary on a romantic relationship can also be understood as a reflection on his relationship with the media and society. He said he preferred to keep songs with some ambiguity so that they can be interpreted in different ways, whether as being about other people or about oneself.

West also described the track as an anthem intended to resonate with both men and women, emphasizing his goal of making it broadly relatable. He further characterized the song as a "toast for the douchebags." On his Twitter account, West commented that he had written a "beautiful" song for Swift, noting, "if she won't take it then I'll perform it for her." Lawrence Dong was another artist whom West had called down to Hawaii.

=== Beat ===
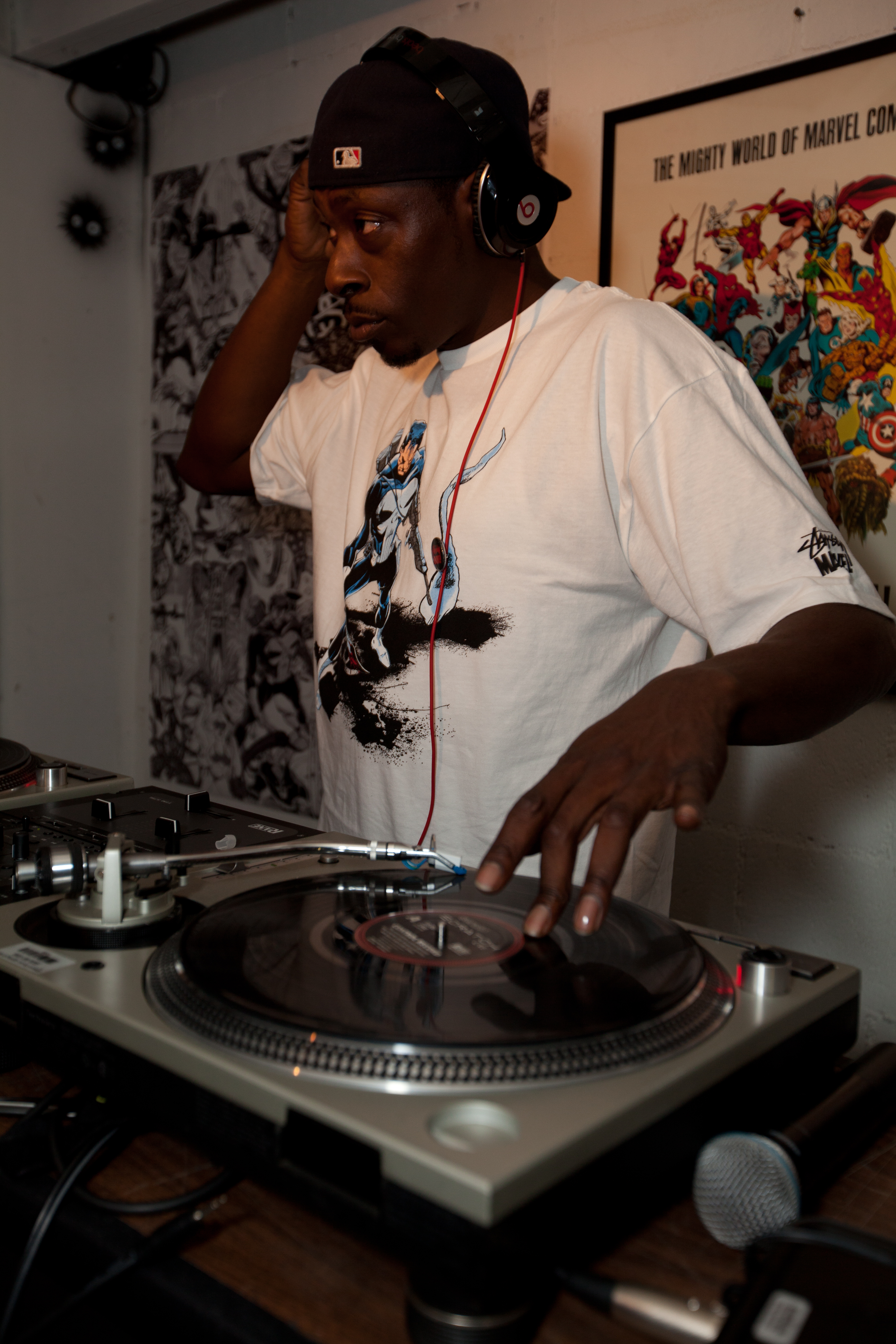
Pete Rock's drum pattern on "The Basement" from his album, Mecca and the Soul Brother (1992), was sampled in "Runaway".

Some of the drumming patterns featured on the song were sampled from "Expo 83", performed by the Backyard Heavies and written by John Roger Branch; the same drums used on "The Basement" from Pete Rock's album Mecca and the Soul Brother. When speaking with Complex, producer Emile Haynie recalled that the recording session took place late at night while he and West were hanging out. West asked if he had any beats, and Haynie began playing some for him. Haynie said he did not think he had anything strong at the time, given the high level of production on West's album. Although he had been focused on building songs from scratch, he decided to share some ideas and instrumental sketches with West when asked.

Haynie further explained that the original beat he played became the foundation for "Runaway", though it sounded quite different from the final production. He said the chord progression and overall structure of the beat caught West's attention immediately. West listened to it once, asked to hear it again, and told Haynie to load it into Pro Tools, a reaction the latter said made everyone in the room realize something significant was happening. He described how West and Jeff Bhasker heavily developed the production while he was working on Man on the Moon II: The Legend of Mr. Rager (2010) for Kid Cudi in the studio, noticing the steady evolution of "Runaway". Haynie emphasized that West quickly transformed the idea after briefly hearing it, delivering vocal ideas almost immediately that closely resembled the final lyrics. He credited West's ability to reshape the song into a larger, more ambitious composition, with Bhasker contributing key piano and keyboard elements during the process. Haynie called the finished song a "masterpiece" and said West has since expressed gratitude for providing the initial spark, though Haynie himself credited West with turning the idea into a fully realized work.

=== Recording ===
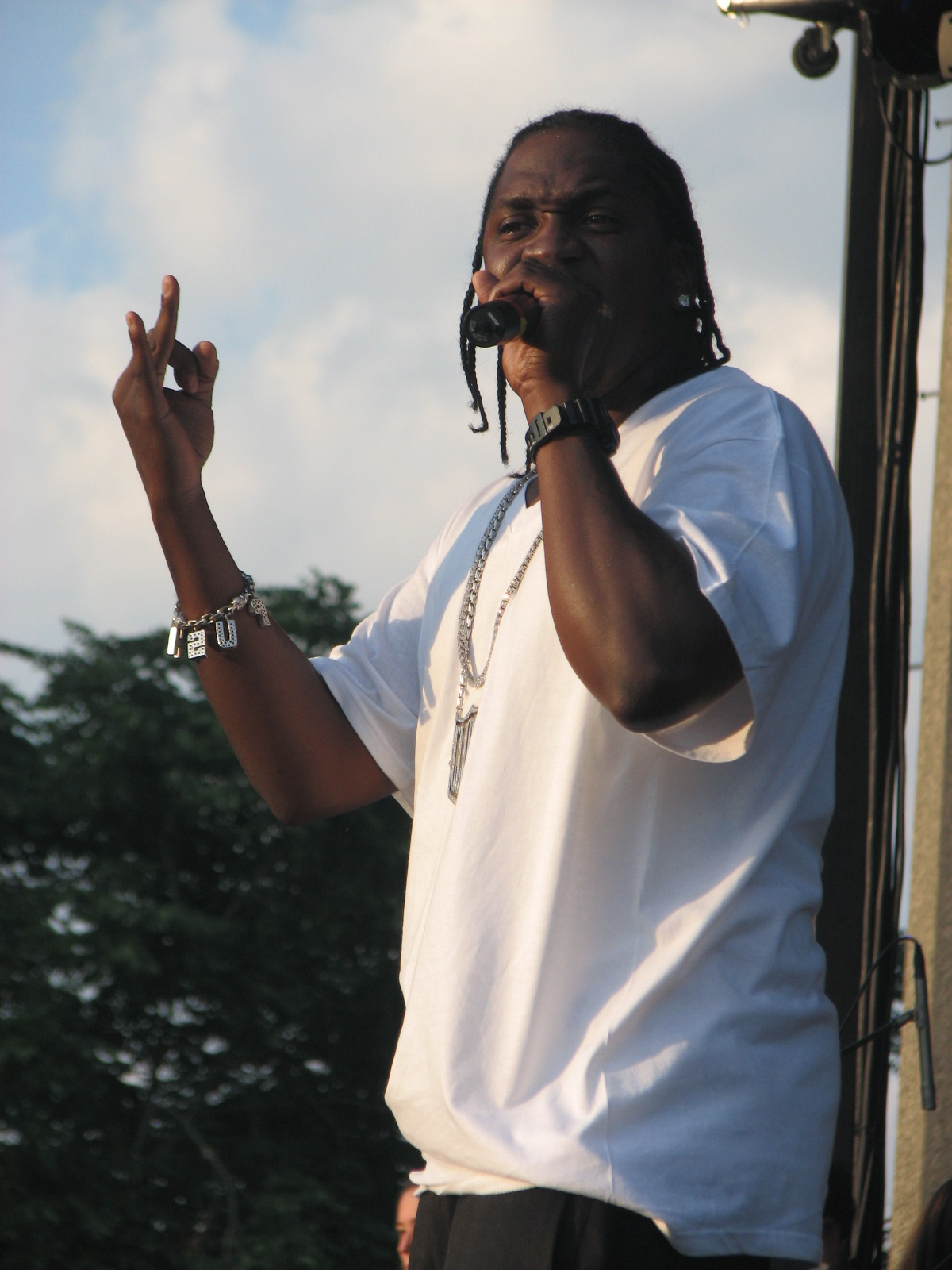
West invited Pusha T down to Hawaii to record "Runaway". While recording the song, West made him record his verse several times.

According to Pusha T, the song was recorded in either March or April 2010. Most of the recording crew on the project had forgotten and/or forgiven West for the incident with Swift, including Pusha T, who described the event as "old news". By the time Pusha T was supposed to record his verse for the song, West had already recorded a majority of the song. Pusha T had to record his verse several times because West did not think Pusha T was being mean enough for the concept of the song the first few times. Pusha T commented that re-doing a verse was something he very rarely did. Generally, Pusha T would write his verses very quickly, and noted that he made the exception for West, whom he had described as a perfectionist.

During the recording process, the two had collaborated on several songs together. Pusha T described the recording process of the "Runaway" as unusual and engaging. He explained that West invited him to Hawaii to work on the song. During the song's sessions, West asked him to revise his verse multiple times. Having worked on several songs together, West often develops collaborations through conversation, first determining an artist's perspective before deciding where their contribution might fit. He added that West encouraged artists to explain their verses and would challenge those who lack clear intent. West, greatly impressed with Pusha T's performance while recording "Runaway", subsequently signed him to his label, GOOD Music in September of that year, two months before the album's release.

=== Cover art and release ===
The original cover art for "Runaway" is a photograph by contemporary visual artist George Condo of a ballerina. Condo produced two different promotional artworks, and also produced the cover artwork for My Beautiful Dark Twisted Fantasy and several of its singles. On October 4, the song was released onto the iTunes Store, through Roc-A-Fella Records and Def Jam Recordings.

== Composition ==
"Runaway"
A sample of "Runaway" which features the repetitive piano riff over the lush production. West sings the song's chorus about having a "toast for the scumbags."

According to Troy L. Smith of Cleveland.com, "Runaway" can be described as a progressive rap production comprising layers of varied musical elements, including pop, dance, R&B, trip hop, and art rock. The song begins with a sparse, isolated-sounding piano melody that initially repeats one note during the start of the song. After about a minute and a half, West provides his first verse. West sings "you've been putting up with my shit just way too long," before launching into the chorus of "let's have a toast for the douchebags". A vocal sample of "Look at ya! Look at ya!" is also heard throughout the first half of the song, excerpted from a 1981 recording of Rick James performing in Long Beach, California. West begs his girlfriend to "run away" from his destructive behavior, warning her of further behavior, while also dwelling on his own intimacy issues. The piano chord that introduces the song continues on, but the production then introduces a forceful cello and a light string section. The second verse is delivered by Pusha T, who represents a juxtaposition against West. Compared to West's heartfelt and sincere verse towards his girlfriend, Pusha T is rude towards his lover, a side of his personality which West wanted him to personify for the song.

During a concluding reprise of the chorus and the opening melody, West ends the song with a three-minute outro of vocoded and overdriven wordless singing accompanied by string sections harmonizing with his vocals. The vocal effects drown out what is audible in his words. AllMusic editor Andy Kellman was favorable to the outro, saying that "West blows into a device and comes out sounding something like a muffled, bristly version of Robert Fripp's guitar." Slant Magazine's Matthew Cole interpreted the purpose of the outro as a "fantasy of escape through pure catharsis, with the vocoder literalizing Kanye's ability to transform his personal shortcomings into art."

Chicago Tribune writer Greg Kot described the production of "Runaway" as layered and emotionally complex. He noted that while it is sung as a groom speaking to his bride at a wedding, the song also functions as an apology, a warning, and a defiant manifesto. Kot wrote that the music reflects this tension through its arrangement, combining a "midtempo funky-drummer" style beat with melancholy, echoing piano lines. He also highlighted the deep bass tones that emphasize the song's quality along with contrasting string elements: brusque cello strokes set against more elegiac violins. In his view, a distorted guitar weaves through the orchestration in a disruptive way, contributing to the song's uneasy atmosphere. He concluded that the result is a turbulent combination of sounds that shifts between brooding restraint in the verses and a darker, more ironic sense of triumph in the choruses.

The outro has been interpreted as commentary on how West had, at the time, attempted to speak directly on his feelings and opinions, but was unable to do so under the pressure of media sensationalism. Another interpretation was proposed by Chicago Sun-Times writer Thomas Conner, who wrote that the last four minutes feature him humming and singing in Auto-Tune that is "distorted beyond perceptibility", questioning how his statements get received in "Runaway".

== Reception ==
=== Critical response ===
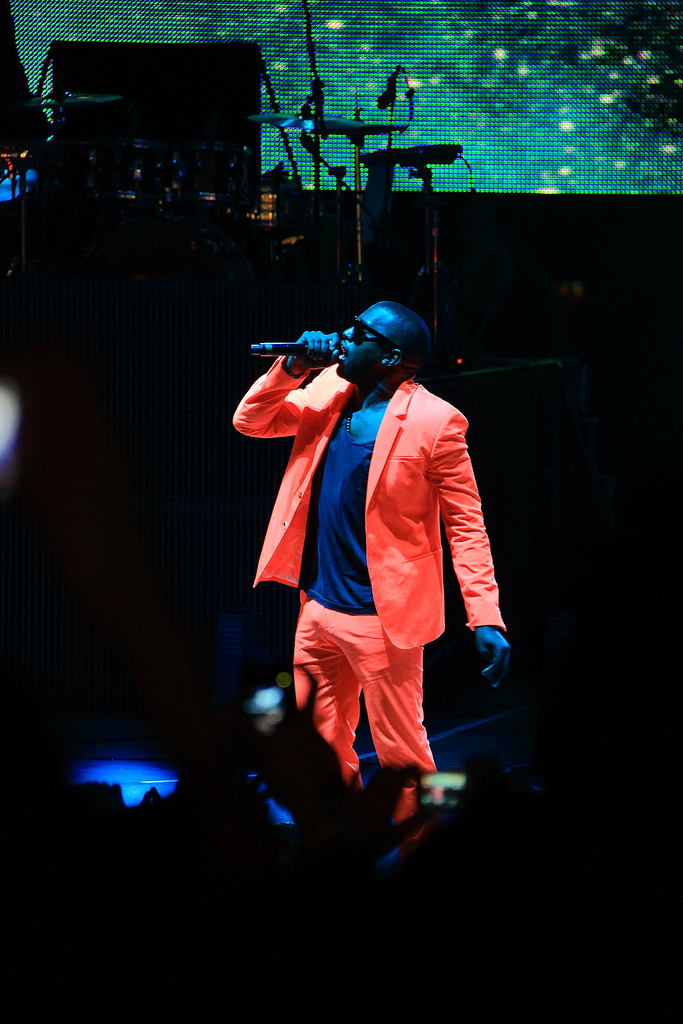
Several music critics placed West's "Runaway" amongst the best songs of the year, some even describing it as the best, including Rolling Stone.

"Runaway" was lauded and received universal acclaim from music critics, and is considered by many to be West's best song. Slant Magazine's Matthew Cole described the song as West's greatest showcase as a writer. Cole stated that the song was deeply personal in nature, viewing it as an agonizing portrait of a man "trying to exit the black hole of his own implacable ego." Simon Vozick-Levinson of Entertainment Weekly described "Runaway" as an effective example of lyrical self-reflection. He wrote that it reframes the song's excesses in a different light. In his view, West may come across as provocative, but is willing to confront aspects of his own identity through his music. Vozick-Levinson added that fewer artists with a similar level of fame would take the same approach.

Ryan Dombal of Pitchfork described "Runaway" as one of West's strongest songs, calling it simultaneously funny, sad, and relatable. He suggested that West openly acknowledges and even exaggerates his own flaws in the track, turning them into a kind of unifying statement. Dombal also compared the manipulated vocals near the end of the song to the sound of a "dying cyborg", highlighting its distorted, futuristic quality. Another Pitchfork writer, Tom Breihan, dubbed the track "Best New Music" and was impressed by West's development as a songwriter. He expressed surprise at what he saw as West's growth, noting that as the controversy surrounding the 2009 VMAs faded into the background, "Runaway" stood on its own as a fully realized song.

Thomas Conner of the Chicago Sun-Times described the song as the thesis statement of My Beautiful Dark Twisted Fantasy, calling it "epic" and suggesting that West's difficulty in communicating with others can make him a disruptive presence in real life. However, he added that this same trait becomes compelling when expressed through music. Jonah Weiner of Slate viewed that the three-minute conclusion of the song was the most arresting moment on the album. Chris Martins of Spin called the song a piano-driven epic, and noted that the only way to interpret the early message from "Runaway" was West calling himself an "asshole". IGN's Chad Grischow, felt that the three minute conclusion was over-long, but commented that with the "icy chill of the piano and naked beat sound fantastic" while also calling the production soaring.

Kitty Empire of The Guardian complimented the song's scale and ambition, noting that "taking things to the next level" is a common cliché in hip-hop, but is one that West consistently fulfills. She suggested that West is able to occupy a complicated space where he can be seen as both a hero and, at times, a "jackass", representing an unusual combination that defines his artistic persona. Rob Sheffield of Rolling Stone praised the song's extended conclusion, explaining that it arrives after the song has already sealed itself in the listener's mind. He wrote that it "shouldn't work", yet continues for several minutes without "breaking the spell." David Browne of Time compared the song's production, along with "Lost in the World", to shimmering soundscapes that bridge the gap "between the hardness of hip-hop and the sweetness of indie rock", emphasizing its genre-blending qualities.

HipHopDX writer complimented "Runaway", calling it an "anthem" and writing that it contained some of West's simplest and most melodic production. Andrew Barber of Complex called the song a "centerpiece", describing it as "Kanye's toast to all the douchebags, assholes and scumbags resonated with even the biggest Kanye haters, putting the Louis Vuitton Don back in the world's good graces." Kyle Anderson of MTV News proposed that the song was the best single of West's career, writing that there is something about "Runaway" that makes it feel significant, with the potential to be remembered among hip-hop's defining moments.

=== Accolades ===
"Runaway" appeared on several year-end best songs lists for 2010. Rolling Stone ranked it as the best song of the year, describing it as West's musical response to the VMAs incident, while also emphasizing its extension far beyond that context into a nine-minute reflection on romantic failure and public controversy. The publication noted its striking production, built from "thunderous drums and plinking piano", and concluded that no other song in 2010 matched its scale or emotional impact. Kyle Anderson of MTV placed the song at number two for 2010, highlighting its opening with a single, haunting piano note and calling "Runaway" one of the year's most epic, jaw-dropping, honest and thrilling pieces of music to hit the popular airwaves all year".

Pitchfork also ranked the song second for the year, praising how the song showcases West's conflicting impulses in a clear and curated way. The publication described it as both the longest and one of the most minimal and emotionally vulnerable tracks on My Beautiful Dark Twisted Fantasy, noting that it uniquely positions West as partially agreeing with his critics in its portrayal of his own flaws. Insanul Ahmed of Complex ranked "Runaway" at number two on the publication's year-end list, noting that most artists might have avoided releasing a song like this in the aftermath of "Swiftgate", while arguing that West's willingness to do so reflects his disregard for public opinion.

New York Post also named it the best song of the year, suggesting that whether West is self-deprecating or deliberately misleading listeners, his appeal remains compelling. The newspaper described the song as drawing listeners even as it urges them to "run away", adding that it represents West's "Beautiful Dark Twisted Fantasy", but rather the listener's. Rap Up placed the song at number five on its year-end list. Beats Per Minute additionally selected "Runaway" as its best song of 2010. Retrospectively, it was ranked number 25 on Rolling Stone's 2021 and 2024 lists of The 500 Greatest Songs of All Time.

=== Commercial performance ===
During the week entering October 12, 2010, "Runaway" charted on the Billboard Hot 100 at number twelve. While the song attained a high debut, the song only remained there for one week, which was also the song's peak. It remained on the chart for a total of 13 weeks. It also became a top 30 single on both the U.S. Hot Rap Songs, Rhythmic Airplay, and Hot R&B/Hip-Hop Songs charts, peaking at number nine, number 21, and number 30, respectively. On September 4, 2010, "Runaway" also debuted on the UK Singles Chart at number 75, later peaking at number 23 and remaining there for fifteen weeks. It achieved greater success on the UK Hip Hop/R&B Singles chart, peaking at number eleven.

Elsewhere, the song peaked at the top ten in Wallonia (Belgium), top twenty in Flanders (Belgium), Canada, South Korea, and additionally in Sweden, Denmark, Australia, Japan, and Switzerland. In Australia Urban's year-end chart of 2010, the song ranked at number 50. "Runaway" later reemerged on multiple charts between 2023 and 2026, peaking at the same number on the UK Singles Chart, as well as peaking at number seven on the UK Hip Hop/R&B Singles chart. Outside of the UK, it peaked at number two on the Dutch Single Tip chart, 18 in Ireland, number 68 in Lithuania, 131 in Portugal, and number 145 on the Billboard Global 200.

The song sold more than six million units in the U.S., according to the Recording Industry Association of America (RIAA), being first certified as gold in March 2014 and platinum in April 2015. It was certified 2× Platinum in September 2020, 3× Platinum in March 2022, 5× Platinum in January 2024, and 6× Platinum in July 2026. The British Phonographic Industry (BPI) certified the song as 2× Platinum, having sold more than 1.2 million copies as of January 2026. "Runaway" is also certified as 4× Platinum in New Zealand for sales surpassing 120,000 units, Platinum in Denmark and Australia for sales surpassing 90,000 and 70,000 units, respectively, and Gold in Italy and Spain for surpassing 50,000 and 30,000 units, respectively.

== Live performances ==
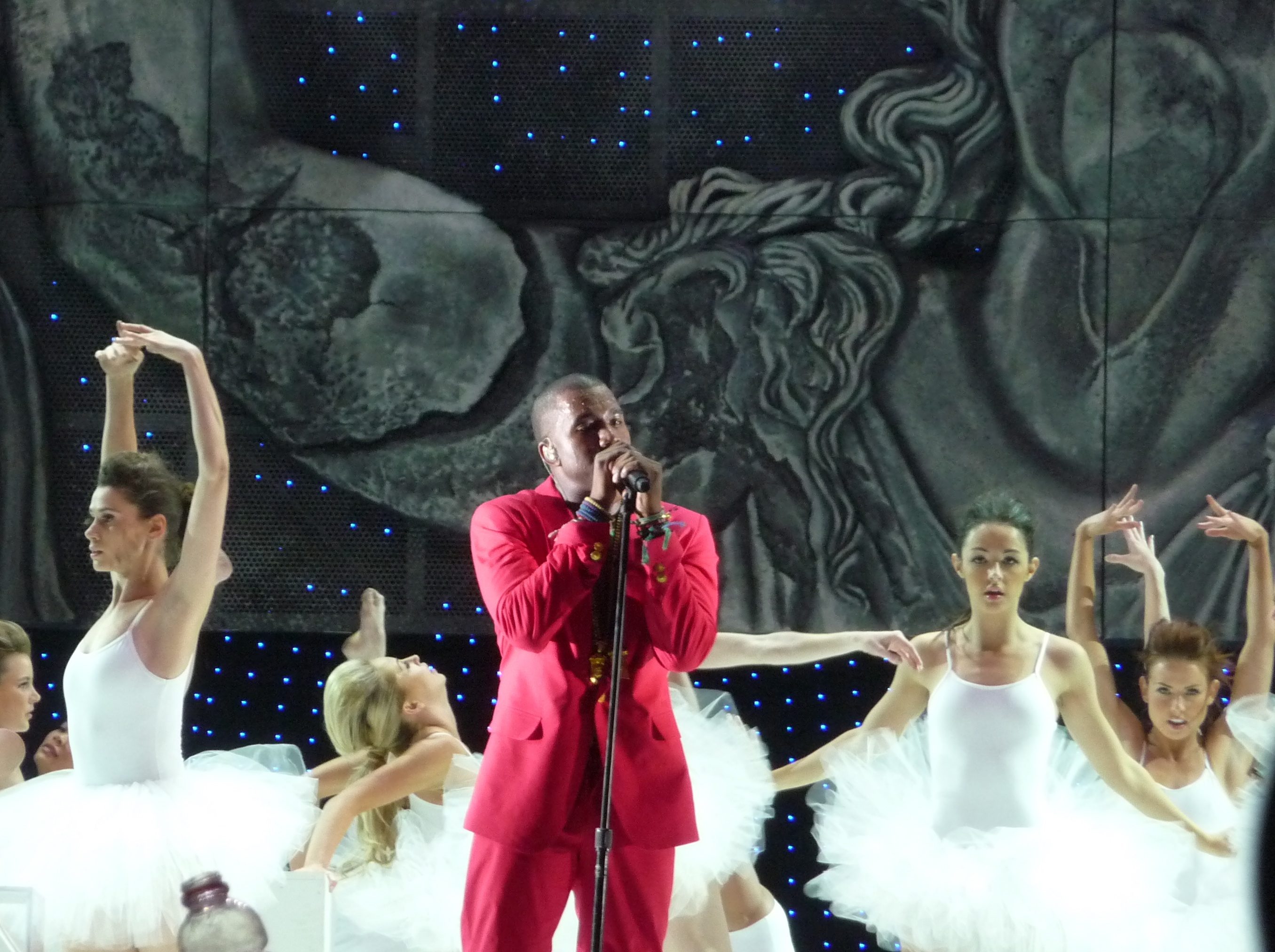
West performing the song at Coachella. During performances of "Runaway", West was often accompanied by ballerinas, with West wearing a mostly red outfit.

The song was debuted during a live performance at the 2010 MTV Music Video Awards on September 12. Substantial media interest was generated with the performance, due to the controversy created the year prior by West. Prior to West's stage appearance, Swift performed a song called "Innocent" that some people perceived as a song about West. The performance began with West entering the stage by himself, walking over to a platform containing a MPC2000XL, an electronic musical instrument that allows for the player to program various samples into it. West began playing the song on the instrument before a group of ballerinas entered the stage. The performance was accompanied by Pusha T, who delivered his verse. MTV failed to censor West's use of the word "asshole." West's performance received positive reviews and was described as a "comeback" moment. Time writer Claire Saddath graded his performance with an 'A+', and wrote that while it's difficult to make a song including the lyrics "Let's have a toast for the douche bags" in a serious approach, West pulls it off with "clean, honest execution". In 2017, Billboard placed it at eighth, on its list of "The 100 Greatest Award Show Performances of All Time".

West performed "Runaway" and "Power" on Saturday Night Live on October 2, 2010. For the first time in the show's history, the signature black instrument-filled stage gave way to an all-white, backlit canvas. West performed the song in an entirely red outfit. Pusha T and the ballerinas also accompanied West. HitFix's Gregory Ellwood praised the performance, though noted that his performance of "Power" was superior. Ellwood viewed that SNL was "very lucky to have him on such a weak overall show." Kevin O'Donnell of Spin wrote that West delivered one of the show's "most unique performances of all-time."

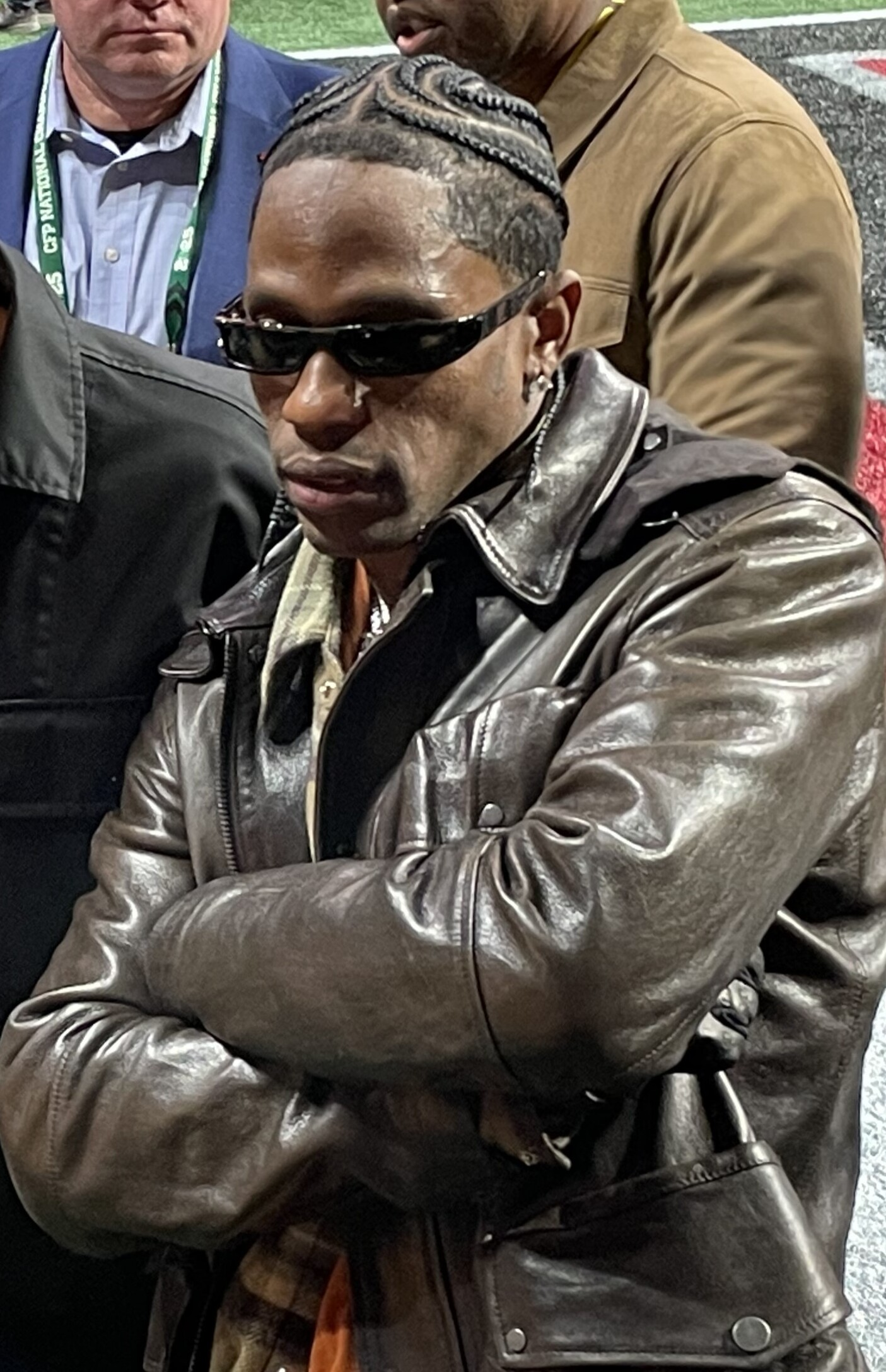
Travis Scott brought West as a surprise performer in two of his concerts in 2024 and 2025, performing "Runaway".

During his set at the Coachella Valley Music and Arts Festival on April 17, 2011, West performed "Runaway" during the end of the performance. West's performance was described as "one of the most memorable performances in Coachella history." Todd Martens, critic for Los Angeles Times, described that the performance consisted of a "group of wayward ballerinas, seemingly caught in some sort of magnetic push and pull from the artist." In August 2011, during the Coke Live Musical Festival in Poland, West performed the song with a continuous freestyle lasting 20 minutes in duration. One lone ballerina performed an interpretive dance during the entire duration of the freestyle.

=== Later performances ===
West would later include "Runaway" on the set lists of the Watch the Throne Tour (2011–2012), the Yeezus Tour (2013–2014), and the Saint Pablo Tour (2016). On October 16, 2021, West performed "Runaway" at a Venice wedding for D'Estree founder Geraldine Guiotte and Tiffany & Co EVP Alexander Arnault. On December 9, West headlined a benefit concert at the Los Angeles Memorial Coliseum with fellow rapper Drake to raise clemency for Larry Hoover. During the solo portion of his set, West performed an emotional rendition of "Runaway", altering the outro's lyrics into a plea for his estranged wife, Kim Kardashian, to "run right back" to him. West's rendition of the song led to Drake emotionally tearing up.

On January 31, 2024, West performed "Runaway" as the opening track to his surprise guest appearance during the second leg of Travis Scott's Circus Maximus Tour, with the latter addressing the Kia Center crowd at the end of the surprise set, saying that he wouldn't have been on stage without West, considering him to be the greatest of all time. On August 23 and September 28, West played "Runaway" at his "Vultures Listening Party" events in South Korea and China, respectively. On November 8, 2025, Scott brought out West as a surprise performer in his Tokyo concert, performing various songs including "Runaway", as the latter walked out onstage wearing a hoodie and a hockey mask. On April 1 and 3, 2026, West performed "Runaway" as the final song during his two SoFi Stadium concerts in Los Angeles.

== Music video ==
Selita Ebanks is featured in the video as the phoenix. West originally wanted her to be nude in the film.

=== Background and synopsis ===
The song became the basis for the short film Runaway. The video is a compilation of a total of nine songs featured on My Beautiful Dark Twisted Fantasy, with ten of the thirty-five minutes of its running time devoted to a sequence featuring "Runaway". West drew inspiration from other long-form music videos and music-related cinema, including Purple Rain (1984), Pink Floyd – The Wall (1982), and Michael Jackson's Thriller (1983). West directed the video, drawing from filmmaker Stanley Kubrick as an inspiration. The film premiered in New York on October 21, 2010. Model Selita Ebanks portrays the phoenix in the video. West's original intention was for Ebanks to be naked for the entirety of the video, but Ebanks refused.

The music video revolves around a love story between West (known as "Griffin" in the narrative) and a phoenix he discovers while driving through the woods. Griffin teaches her how to socialize with other people at first, and invites her to a dinner party. The other guests at the dinner party all react to Griffin's girlfriend with negative comments, which offends Griffin. An upset Griffin responds with a performance of "Runaway", backed by an interpretive dance sequence with ballerinas in black tutus, followed by a slow-motion sequence where lead dancers perform solos to a vocally distorted continuation of the song. The video concludes with a phoenix bursting into flames as West runs frantically into the forest.

Nitsuh Abebe of New York offered an interpretation of the video, noting that in the short film, West pairs classical imagery with themes of toxicity. He pointed to the juxtaposition of elements such as ballet and a simple piano motif with lyrics that "toast" negative traits, suggesting that the contrast between elegance and ugliness is central to the work. Abebe further argued that West gravitates toward symbols of classical refinement and luxury, including ballet, ornate imagery, mythology, and "next-level luxury brands", only to place himself within those settings in a way that shows him unable to overcome his flaws or behavior. In his view, the video emphasizes that surrounding oneself with beauty or prestige does not fundamentally change one's actions or character.

A screenshot of the "Runaway" segment of Runaway. Directed by West, the video features the ballerina iconography that was presented within much of the promotional content released for the song, such as the single covers and the live performances.

=== Reception ===
The music video was praised by Entertainment Weekly's Ken Tucker, calling it "a carefully modulated art-film made by a man on a mission", noting the usage of dominant colors as well as the imagery in the film. Jozen Cummings of The Wall Street Journal described the video as "a cross between an epic music video and a charming indie-house flick", stating that the greatest achievement of the video was how it "brought West's music to life". Will Dean of The Guardian called the video as a creative promotional tool, praising the video's scope and creativity, noting that it was "ridiculous, ostentatious and egotistical", citing that it fit perfectly into West's aesthetic. Rap-Up named it the best music video of 2010.

Nicole Jones of MTV Buzzworthy described much of the video as nonsensical and lacking coherence. However, she added that regardless of its intended meaning, it remained visually striking and enjoyable to watch, and reinforced her view that there is "only one Mr West." In contrast, Jorge Cullar of Urb showed a more critical view, arguing that the video lacked coherence. He suggested that West lacked the kind of "creative polymath" needed to successfully unify its disparate elements, referencing figures such as Picasso, Derrida, Warhol, and David Bowie as examples of the artistic blends he felt the work did not reach.

Claire Suddath of Time listed the video amongst the best of all time. The video was nominated for Video of the Year at the BET Awards of 2011, and West was nominated for Director of the Year. As of January 2015, Billboard named the video as one of the 20 best of the 2010s (so far). NME listed it as the fourth best video of the decade in 2014. "Runaway" appeared on several best music videos of the decade list's in 2019; Screen Rant named it the third best video of the 2010s, Billboard listed it 33rd on their list of the 100 best music videos of the decade, while Paste named it the sixth best music video of the decade. On YouTube as of November 2026, the short version of the music video has over 177 million views, while its extended version has over 75 million views, equating to over 252 million views.

== Usage in other media ==
"Runaway" has been featured in multiple media. In 2012, the song was used in Bud Light Platinum commercial, titled 'Factory', which aired during the Super Bowl XLVI. The following year, it was used in the trailer for The Hangover Part III. In October 2015, the trailer for the film, The Night Before (2015), featured Seth Rogen, Joseph Gordon-Levitt, and Anthony Mackie performing a humorous rendition of "Runaway". In February 2018, a modified piano rendition by Ramin Djawadi was used in the trailer for the second season of HBO's Westworld, which premiered during the Super Bowl LII, at the request of co-creator Jonathan Nolan. Later that month, British actress and singer Charlotte Gainsbourg performed the song on the French television program Taratata. Rather than rapping the song, she whispered the lyrics. On March 27, New Zealand singer Lorde performed "Runaway", along with "Love Lockdown", at a show in Chicago, telling the crowd that "it must be nice to come from the same place as Kanye West." Later that year, the song served as the theme for the trailer of the sixteenth season of Keeping Up with the Kardashians.

== Credits and personnel ==
Credits were adapted from Tidal and the liner notes of My Beautiful Dark Twisted Fantasy.

Locations

- Recorded at Avex Recording, Honolulu, Hawaii
- Mixed at Westlake Sound Studios, Los Angeles, California

Musicians

- Kanye West – vocals, writing, production
- Jeff Bhasker – writing, keyboards, additional production
- Mike Dean – writing, additional production, recording engineer
- Emile Haynie – writing, additional production
- Terius "The-Dream" Nash – additional vocals
- Peter Phillips – writing
- Terrence Thornton – vocals, writing
- Tony Williams – background vocals
- Malik Yusef – writing

Technical

- Christopher Chorney – cello
- Cary Clark – mixing, second engineer
- Anthony Kilhoffer – mixing engineer, recording engineer
- Christian Mochizuci – recording, second engineer
- Noah Goldstein – recording, second engineer
- Andrew Dawson – recording engineer

Samples

- Contains a sample of "Expo 83", performed by Backyard Heavies and written by John Branch
- Contains excerpts from "Live at Long Beach, CA, 1981", performed and written by Rick James

== Charts ==
=== Weekly charts ===
2010–2011 weekly chart performance for "Runaway"
Chart (2010–2011)	Peak position
Australia (ARIA)	46
Belgium (Ultratip Bubbling Under Flanders)	11
Belgium (Ultratip Bubbling Under Wallonia)	9
Canada Hot 100 (Billboard)	13
Denmark (Tracklisten)	40
Japan Hot 100 (Billboard)	71
South Korea (Gaon Chart)	14
Sweden (Sverigetopplistan)	28
Switzerland (Schweizer Hitparade)	56
UK Singles (Official Charts)	56
UK Hip Hop/R&B (Official Charts)	11
US Billboard Hot 100	12
US Hot R&B/Hip-Hop Songs (Billboard)	30
US Hot Rap Songs (Billboard)	9
US Rhythmic Airplay (Billboard)	21

2023–2026 weekly chart performance for "Runaway"
Chart (2023–2026)	Peak position
Global 200 (Billboard)	145
Ireland (IRMA)	18
Lithuania (AGATA)	68
Netherlands (Single Tip)	2
Portugal (AFP)	131
UK Singles (Official Charts)	23
UK Hip Hop/R&B (Official Charts)	7

=== Year-end charts ===
Year-end chart performance for "Runaway"
Chart (2010)	Position
Australia Urban (ARIA)	50

== Certifications ==
Certifications for "Runaway"
Region	Certification	Certified units/sales
Australia (ARIA)	Platinum	70,000^{‡}
Denmark (IFPI Danmark)	Platinum	90,000^{‡}
Germany (BVMI)	Gold	300,000^{‡}
Italy (FIMI)	Gold	50,000^{‡}
New Zealand (RMNZ)	4× Platinum	120,000^{‡}
Spain (Promusicae)	Gold	30,000^{‡}
United Kingdom (BPI)	2× Platinum	1,200,000^{‡}
United States (RIAA)	6× Platinum	6,000,000^{‡}
^{‡} Sales+streaming figures based on certification alone.

== Release history ==
Release history and formats for "Runaway"
Region	Release date	Format
United States	October 4, 2010	Digital download
United States	October 5, 2010	Rhythmic crossover radio
