= Runaway (2010 film) =

2010 short film by Kanye West

- Promotional poster
- Directed by: Kanye West
- Screenplay by: Hype Williams
- Story by: Kanye West
- Produced by: Jonathan Lia
- Starring: Kanye West; Selita Ebanks
- Cinematography: Kyle Kibbe
- Edited by: Peter Johnson; Derek Lee
- Music by: Kanye West
- Release date: October 5, 2010
- Running time: 35 minutes
- Country: United States
- Language: English

Runaway is a 2010 American musical short film directed by Kanye West.

It serves as the music video for a compilation of songs from West's album, My Beautiful Dark Twisted Fantasy, released that same year. It is inspired by other musical films such as Purple Rain, Pink Floyd – The Wall and Michael Jackson's Thriller and painters Pablo Picasso and Henri Matisse. Directors Federico Fellini and Stanley Kubrick as well as fashion designer Karl Lagerfeld are also direct inspirations. The film depicts a romantic relationship between a man and a half-woman, half-phoenix, and is set to music by West from My Beautiful Dark Twisted Fantasy.

== Plot ==
The film opens with Griffin (West) running down a road in a forest with his shirt unbuttoned, with "Lacrimosa" by Mozart playing in the background. This is followed with a narration by Martha Zolanski; one of Nicki Minaj's alter egos. Griffin is then shown driving his MTX Tatra V8 through the forest with "Dark Fantasy" playing in the background. A phoenix (Ebanks), appearing as half-woman and half-phoenix, crashes down to Earth as a meteorite and Griffin crashes his MTX Tatra V8 in the forest. This scene, according to GQ, echoes West's car accident that was the inspiration for "Through the Wire". While the car explodes in the background, Griffin carries the phoenix in his arms and brings her home. As "Gorgeous" plays, the phoenix comes into contact with objects from the human world, including a news display on a flat-screen television (which shows a news broadcast in the English and Czech language) and a porcelain teacup. After she dances to a remix of "Power" that Griffin plays on an MPC2000XL, he takes her to see different sights, including a carnival with a papier-mâché bust of Michael Jackson, a marching band, and fireworks in the desert. "All of the Lights" is heard during this sequence. Griffin falls in love with the phoenix and they attend a formal dinner party, during which "Devil in a New Dress" is heard. The disgusted guests appear to exchange negative comments about the phoenix. The party-goers are dressed in white, with the exception of Griffin and the exotic Phoenix, who stands out as both worldly and other-worldly, by comparison to the other guests. Biblical imagery gives the setting a church-like quality. The first course is bread and a pink beverage served in wine glasses, suggesting Holy Communion. Later, "loaves and fishes" are on the menu.

An upset Griffin responds with a performance of "Runaway", backed by an interpretive dance sequence with ballerinas in black tutus, followed by a slow-motion sequence where lead dancers perform solos to an Auto-Tuned continuation of the song. The diners toast to the lyrics saluting the "douche bags" and applaud Griffin's performance. The dinner ends when the phoenix, horrified, screams in anguish at the revelation that the main dish is a large turkey, driving the guests away from the table. The beginning of "Hell of a Life", is played during this scene. In the DVD version, "Monster" is heard. It then cuts to a scene of the phoenix sitting in Griffin's garden whilst a dark cloud overwhelms the sky; accompanied by "Blame Game". The couple is seen sitting outside under the stars (in a scene reminiscent of Jackson's Moonwalker) where they chat about the creation of sculptures. The phoenix claims they are phoenixes that have been turned to stone by society. She comments on the repressive nature of his world, declaring, "Do you know what I hate most about your world? Anything that is different you try to change." She then tells him she must burst into flames to avoid this fate, and thus, return to her world. Griffin, however, cannot accept this and they make love to "Lost in the World" (featuring Bon Iver). He wakes up the next morning on his apartment roof, with the phoenix nowhere to be found, and is eventually revealed that it is now flying across the sky to fulfill her fate, being adorned in a golden chest plate. The film ends with Griffin desperately running through the forest, presumably in an (ultimately futile) attempt to find her and stop her, while the phoenix contemplates this, notably sad, and continues on her flight.

== Set list ==
1. "Lacrimosa"
2. "Dark Fantasy"
3. "Gorgeous"
4. "Power" (remix)
5. "All of the Lights"
6. "Devil in a New Dress"
7. "Runaway"
8. "Hell of a Life"
9. "Blame Game"
10. "Lost in the World"

== Production ==
Runaway was filmed in Prague over a period of four days in the summer of 2010. The script was written by Hype Williams, from a story by West. Vanessa Beecroft served as the art director with Jonathan Lia producing; also with Creative Consultants Virgil Abloh, Alexandre Moors, and Jason Last. Yemi A.D. was responsible for the choreographical element of the ballet dancers in the Runaway song sequence. West describes the video as an "overall representation of what [he dreams]" and a parallel to his music career. Speaking to MTV News, West said he wanted women in his life, including his mother and ex-girlfriends, represented in the video and for them to "connect with the different emotions". According to model Selita Ebanks, who co-stars in the video, the moral is "the world doesn't accept, or they try to change, what is different, instead of trying to understand it".

Cinematographer Kyle Kibbe explained that West was looking to adopt a flexible approach. "Kanye wanted a lot of flexibility in terms of being able to go to these locations and be open to whatever creative impulses took place,". The camera used for filming was the Arri Alexa.

== Release ==
The teaser trailer for the film debuted during the 2010 MTV Video Music Awards and the full video was screened in Paris on October 5 and at the BAFTA on October 6. The video debuted on October 23, 2010, on Vevo, MTV, MTV2, YTV, BET, and VH1.com. The film debuted on YouTube two days later.

=== Critical response ===
The music video was praised by Entertainment Weekly's Ken Tucker, calling it "a carefully modulated art-film made by a man on a mission", noting the usage of dominant colors as well as the imagery in the film. Jozen Cummings of The Wall Street Journal described the video as "a cross between an epic music video and a charming indie-house flick", stating that the greatest achievement of the video was how it "brought West's music to life". Will Dean of The Guardian called the video as a creative promotional tool, praising the video's scope and creativity, noting that it was "ridiculous, ostentatious and egotistical", citing that it fit perfectly into West's aesthetic.

Nicole Jones of MTV Buzzworthy stated that the majority of the video was nonsensical and added up to little coherently, but wrote that regardless of its true meaning, the video was "really pretty to watch, the music is great, and it reminds us once again why there is only one Mr. West.” Claire Suddath of Time listed the video amongst the best of all time.

=== Accolades ===
The video was nominated for Video of the Year at the BET Awards 2011, and West was nominated for Director of the Year.
