= Monster (Kanye West song) =

2010 song by Kanye West

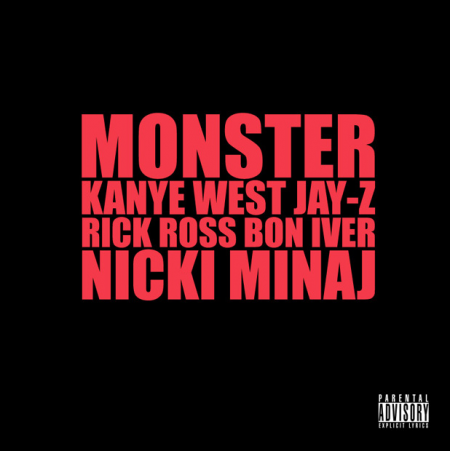

Single by Kanye West featuring Jay-Z, Rick Ross, Nicki Minaj and Bon Iver

from the album My Beautiful Dark Twisted Fantasy
- Released: October 23, 2010
- Recorded: 2010
- Genre: Hip hop; horrorcore; hardcore hip-hop
- Length: 6:18
- Label: Roc-A-Fella; Def Jam
- Songwriters: Kanye West; Shawn Carter; Mike Dean; William Roberts II; Onika Maraj; Patrick Reynolds; Justin Vernon
- Producers: Kanye West; Mike Dean; Plain Pat

Kanye West singles chronology
"Runaway" (2010)	"Monster" (2010)	"Start It Up" (2010)

Jay-Z singles chronology
"Hot Tottie" (2010)	"Monster" (2010)	"H.A.M." (2011)

Rick Ross singles chronology
"All I Do Is Win" (2010)	"Monster" (2010)	"Swagger Right" (2010)

Bon Iver singles chronology
"Skinny Love" (2008)	"Monster" (2010)	"Fall Creek Boys Choir" (2011)

Nicki Minaj singles chronology
"Right Thru Me" (2010)	"Monster" (2010)	"I Ain't Thru" (2010)

"Monster" is a song by American rapper Kanye West, released as the third single from his fifth studio album, My Beautiful Dark Twisted Fantasy (2010). The song features rappers Jay-Z, Rick Ross, and Nicki Minaj, along with indie folk group Bon Iver. All five credited acts have writing credits on the posse cut, with the production handled by West, Mike Dean, and Plain Pat. The instrumental is atmospheric and drum-heavy, and the lyrics reflect influences from horror films, creating an eerie composition which drew critical comparisons to the Michael Jackson track "Thriller".

Originally released through West's GOOD Friday initiative, a weekly free music giveaway he started to promote My Beautiful Dark Twisted Fantasy, "Monster" was later confirmed to be featured on the album, and was released as a digital download on October 23. It was met with mostly positive reviews from music critics, with Minaj's verse receiving widespread acclaim, and West's production being well received. However, critics were mixed in their assessing of who had the better verse between West and Jay-Z. The song was listed amongst the best tracks of 2010 by publications, with NME placing it at number 53 on its list of the "150 Best Tracks of the Past 15 Years". The song debuted and peaked on the Billboard Hot 100 at position 18.

"Monster" was promoted with a music video directed by Jake Nava. The video featured atmospheric cinematography and extensive horror imagery, including zombies and decapitated corpses, as well as visual references to classic horror films. Critics described the content of the video as weird and disturbing, and it drew criticism for its portrayal of women. The controversy resulted in a ban from MTV.

== Background ==
To promote his upcoming fifth album, West launched GOOD Fridays, a weekly free music giveaway. The intention was to release a free new song every Friday for a few months, and the weekly tracks generally featured various rappers from his label, GOOD Music, and other artists he usually collaborated with. In the first week West released onto his website a remix of the album's first single, "Power", and "Monster" was released on the second week. The song was promptly removed from his website and replaced with another track, with "Monster" being uploaded as a digital single onto iTunes. West announced that "Monster" was actually intended for his collaborative album Watch the Throne with Jay-Z. West's announcement failed to surface however, and the song actually appeared on My Beautiful Dark Twisted Fantasy and was released as the album's third single.

=== Recording ===
Following some media controversies, West chose to record his fifth studio album My Beautiful Dark Twisted Fantasy in a reclusive manner in Oahu, Hawaii. Like the majority of the album, "Monster" was composed there. Rapper Rick Ross was invited to Hawaii to work with West, because West was set to produce the song "Live Fast, Die Young", which appeared on Teflon Don, an album by Ross. While Ross was there with West in his recording studio, he actually walked in on West while recording another song. Ross was not initially intended to be featured on West's album, however Ross was so impressed with what he heard he decided to record a quick, though short verse.

Ross had the concept of the song explained to him by West, which according to Ross, blew him away in presentation. West was so impressed by Ross that he invited him back to his studio during the final stages of the album, where he also appeared on "Devil in a New Dress". While Ross was there, both Jay-Z and Minaj were recording their verses. Ross expressed his admiration for Minaj, who impressed him during the recording. He stated that what he had observed had earned him respect for Minaj, who called the recording process a "moment of history".

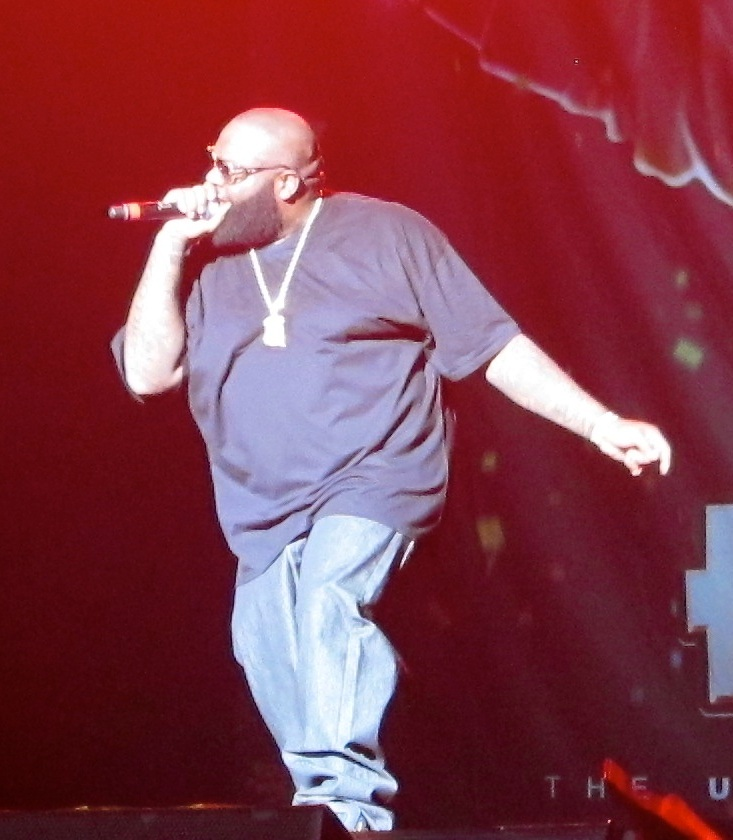
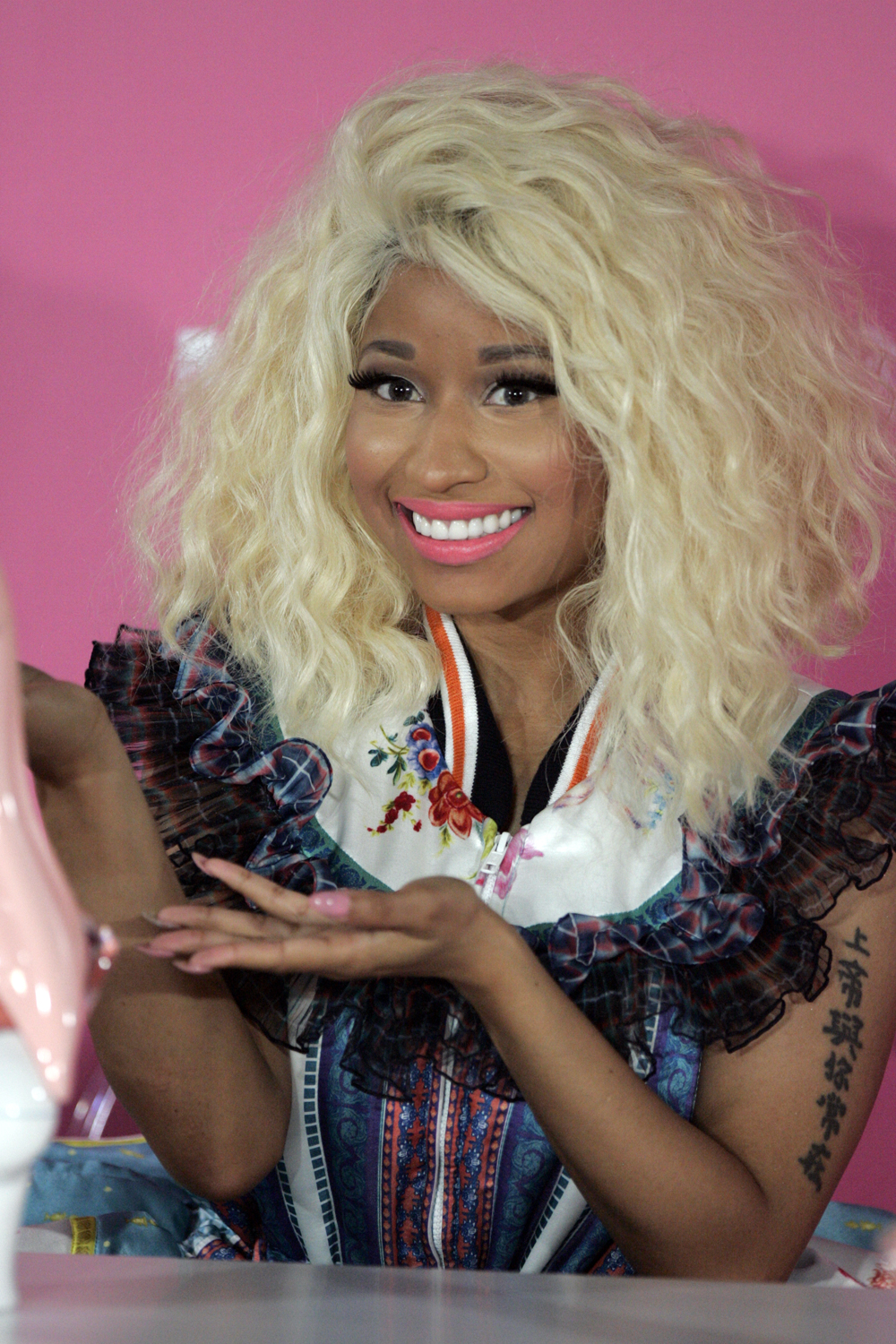
Rap artists Rick Ross (left) and Nicki Minaj (right) are both featured on the song. Ross was impressed with the song's concept and asked if he could deliver the intro. Minaj appeared on the song due in part to her admiration of Jay-Z. Ross expressed admiration for Minaj, and praised her lyricism.

Minaj expressed excitement when approached to collaborate on the song, and she had contributed 32 bars to the track. Her main inspiration behind working on the track was the possibility of meeting Jay-Z, with whom she was obsessed since a young age. According to her, she literally couldn't have a conversation without quoting a line by him, and it was a dream come true to collaborate with the artist. Minaj had recorded her lines around four months before the lyrics finally appeared on the song. Minaj described both Jay-Z and West as "icons", and stated that she was blessed to be working with them. In an interview with Rap-Up, Minaj mused "never in a billion years would've thought that I would've not only been on a song with one of them but both them".

Justin Vernon's involvement on the song stemmed from being approached by West directly. West first got into contact with Vernon when he directly phoned him, with the intention of sampling his song "Woods". The two talked on the phone for about 40 minutes, where West explained some of the concepts for the project, and invited him down to his studio in Hawaii. West is a big admirer of Bon Iver's album For Emma, Forever Ago, and was impressed with Vernon's unique use of auto-tune. The two artists became friends while playing games of basketball together, and West introduced him to Jeff Bhasker, one of his main producers.

Vernon was sampled on another song from the album, "Lost in the World" and appears on vocals on "Monster". While there during recording sessions, he had reportedly recorded 10 tracks. He watched Minaj record her verse, and he too, expressed admiration for Minaj's performance on the song, however he noted that initially he had no idea who she was. Vernon described the process as highly artistic, stating that the fourteen-hour day recording schedule allowed for a lot of fun and creativity. West, talking about recording the song with Vernon, stated that he was "similar to me, where he just does shit just so people would be like, 'Oh shit, how did you do that? How did that happen?' He's just a really cool guy to be around."

== Composition ==
"Monster"
A 30-second sample of "Monster" which features the closing lines of Kanye's verse and the beginning of the chorus. The production has been described as unnerving, with several tonal shifts in frequency.

Considered a horrorcore song, "Monster" has been described as brooding, disturbing, creepy and the "weirdest A-list event-rap posse cut in recent memory." The song begins with an ominous, distorted vocal roar, sung by Justin Vernon of Bon Iver, with Vernon declaring "I shoot the lights out", which sets up the dark atmosphere of the track. The intro of the song is followed by a brief verse given by Ross, delivered in the rapping style of boom bap. In a deep voice, Ross asserts the lines "bitch, I'm a monster, no good bloodsucker, fat motherfucker, now look who's in trouble," over the eerie production featured during the beginning. Following the introduction by Ross, West then provides the song's hook, singing "everybody know / I'm a motherfuckin' monster" in a heavily distorted manner. West then launches into a full verse. Chicago Sun-Times writer Thomas Conner stated that West rhyming "esophagus" with "sarcophagus" was surely a hip-hop first.

Jay-Z appears on the song after West's verse, and raps in a more forceful, sinister flow. During his verse, Jay-Z references several different horror characters, including the Sasquatch, Godzilla, King Kong, the Loch Ness Monster, goblins, ghouls and zombies. Lyrically Jay-Z discusses his discontent at former associates, and concludes his verse by admitting that his Achilles' heel is "love". Minaj is the final rapper to appear on the song, who delivers her lines in an urgent, energetic manner. Minaj's delivery has been described as surreal, changing delivery in mid-line. In her verse, Minaj references Jamaican DJ Tony Matterhorn. The song ends in a spooky, hoarse vocal riff delivered by Vernon, reminiscent of the track "Thriller". An extended vocal riff, described as "scratchy" closes the track. Pitchfork's Tom Breihan summarized the content of the song, writing:

Rick Ross drops by to say hi, keeping his appearance so brief that I can't help but wonder what he's even doing here. Justin Vernon inexplicably bookends the thing, pushing his falsetto into Antony range on the outro and muttering befuddling lyrics that have nothing to do with the rest of the song. All this over the straight-up funkiest beat Kanye West has made in years, a rippling electro push-pull that adds an effortless strut to his recent progged-out chilliness. But all that other stuff fades into the background when Nicki Minaj shows up. [...] She's a whirlwind of energy, showing her full repertoire of nutso voices and kicking the living f*ck out of the beat, sounding like she's having an absolute blast the whole time."

The song heavily features bombastic tribal drums, and paranoia-inducing strings that create a feeling of tension. The beat of "Monster" has been described as a "hyperventilating death rattle" by The Washington Post's Chris Richards, commenting that the song was permeated with dark, urgent-sounding moans. The chorus of the song has two separate meanings; on the surface, it appears that West is bragging about his abilities as a rapper, while also making a comment on the media's reception of him, with lines like "gossip, gossip, nigga just stop it, everybody knows I'm a muthafuckin' monster".

== Critical reception ==
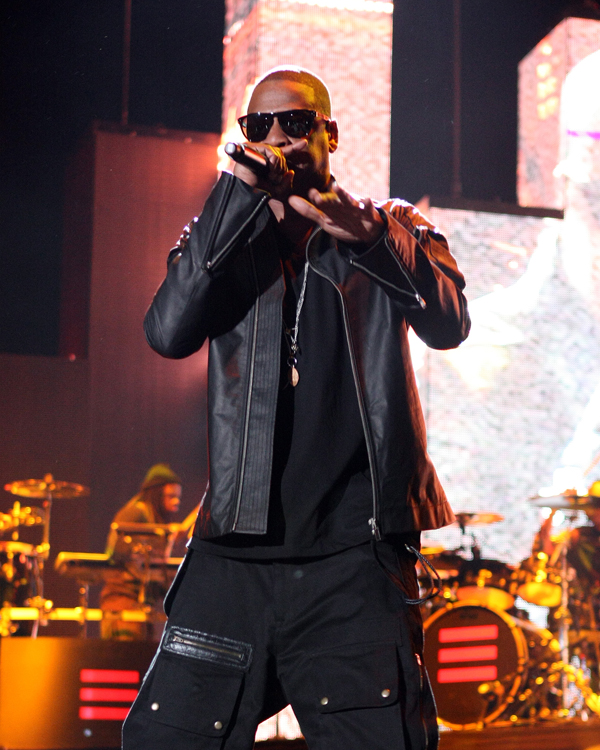
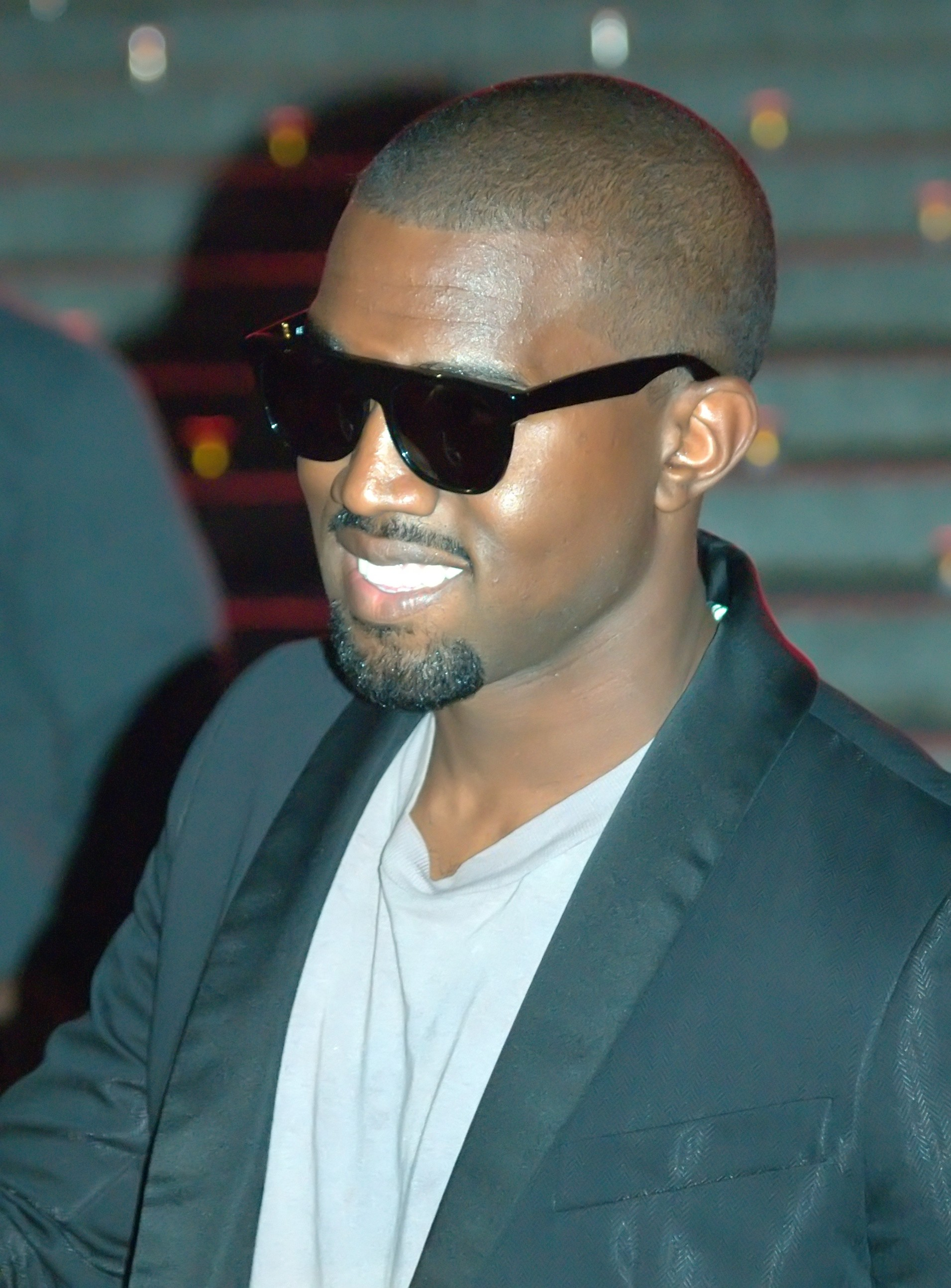
Watch the Throne collaborators Jay-Z (left) and Kanye West (right) received acclaim for their performances on "Monster". Critics were divided on who had the superior verse out of the two, though Minaj was often cited as surpassing both rappers on the track. The production by West was also widely acclaimed.

"Monster" was well received by critics, with most singling out Minaj's verse as a highlight of the song. Becky Bain of Idolator stated that while the song featured five distinct artists, Minaj actually had the brightest appearance on the song. Sara D. Anderson of AOL gave the song a positive review, complimenting each artist on their contribution. Chris Ryan of MTV positively reviewed West, Jay-Z and Minaj as the stand out rappers in the song, stating "on car stereos, computers and in clubs all over, nothing got more burn than 'Monster,' his new beastly posse cut. Kanye spits about his presence being a present to us all, Jay-Z comes through with what might be his strongest verse in years, and that's where Nicki comes in, more than holding her own against the bad boys." Pitchfork Media's Ryan Dombal reported that Minaj gave the verse of her life, and applauded the contributions by Ross, who added a "hallucinatory tone" to the song. Another Pitchfork writer, Tom Breihan mused that the track contained the "straight-up funkiest beat" West has made in years, while commenting that Minaj was the best in show.

The Village Voice's Sean Fennessey commented that "Monster" was the track that announced Minaj's "brilliance" to most people, stating that when the posse cut "crept up the Hot 100, the song became more than track six—it became an essential part of this album's story, delivered months early." Alex Denney of NME mused that the track "proves a riotous bit of respite" and features West "sending up his rep with a self-mocking diatribe about drowning his pain in a blizzard of blow jobs and mass adulation while Nicki Minaj sets the dials to 'ridiculous' with a fire-breathing, raga-inflected verse." Embling of Tiny Mix Tapes felt that with "super-sized cipher cuts" like "Monster" and "So Appalled", West balanced out some of the darker moments of My Beautiful Dark Twisted Fantasy, and that the song contained heavy "shit-talking." Slant Magazine's Cole Matthew also commented that posse cuts "Monster" and "So Appalled" were amongst the hardest tracks ever produced by West.

IGN's Chad Grischow mused that the track featured great guest appearances from Jay-Z and Minaj, going as far as saying that Minaj's performance "clears up what all the hype is about for anyone still unsure". Robert Christgau of MSN Music stated that West perfectly acknowledged his status as a rapper, and noted that his persona seems to be aware that his "bling-and-sex brag is about to get blown away by padrone Jay-Z's 'all I see is these niggaz I made millionaires/Millin about' and pink-haired Nicki Minaj's 'bitch from Sri Lanka-Willy Wonka-watch the queen conquer' trifecta." David Amidon of PopMatters praised the production of the song, and stated that the track features "glass-shattering bass". Nitsuh Abebe of Vulture declared that Minaj gave one of the best verses of the year.

Nathan Rabin of The A.V. Club praised the guest picks on the album, musing that West trades verses with the "few superstars fit to breathe his rarified air, including Jay-Z, Rick Ross, and Nicki Minaj, who single-handedly justifies her deafening buzz with her verse on the song." Kitty Empire of The Guardian praised West's performance on the song describing it as "brilliant", but also noted that on the particular song Minaj and Jay-Z were superior to him, citing Minaj's verse as her career's best. Siim Nurklik from "Eesti Ekspress" also seems to agree with Kitty, as he claims "Nicki's final verse on "Monster" is just colossal." Dan Vidal of URB stated that West milks the potential of his guest rappers to the most impressive degree, reporting that Jay-Z's generally relaxed performance was "with a fiery growl on" and that it "features Nicki Minaj going even more bonkers with her flow than we're accustomed to." Sputnikmusic's Channing Freeman echoed the consensus about Minaj stating that her verse was the most memorable part of the song, though felt that Bon Iver's appearance didn't add up to much.

=== Accolades ===
Gigwise named it the best song of 2010. The song was named the "Collaboration of the Year" 2010 by HipHopDX. Minaj's verse for the song was named "Verse of the Year" by the same website. Rolling Stone ranked it number 10 on its list of the Best Singles of 2010. Rap-Up declared the song the third best of 2010. MTV News declared the track the 14th best of the year. In January 2011, The Village Voice's Pazz & Jop annual critics' poll named "Monster" the sixth-best single of 2010; West's other singles "Power" and "Runaway" were ranked at numbers five and four, respectively on the same poll. Dagsavisen placed it third on its list of the best 10 best songs of 2010. Dagbladet named it the fifth best song of 2010. Slant Magazine ranked it 19th on its list of the best singles of 2010. Hot Press named it one of the best songs of 2010. "Monster" was named the 19th best song of 2010 by Beats Per Minute.

In October 2011, NME placed it at number 53 on its list "150 Best Tracks of the Past 15 Years", with the site's staff stating that while West had a good performance on the song, it was "star turns from Jay-Z (channeling his world-weary hip hop legend who just needed a cuddle) and Nicki Minaj (a show stealing turn from the heir apparent who was battling herself as much as the haters) that took this track over." In 2013, Complex ranked Minaj's verse on "Monster" as the best rap verse of the past five years. It was ranked at number 69 by Rolling Stone on their list of "100 Greatest Hip-Hop songs of all time". In 2014, Fact placed it at number 30 on its list of The 100 best songs of the 2010s. The 2015 book The Rap Year Book which deconstructed the most important rap songs every year since 1979, chose "Monster" as the most important rap song of 2010.

"Monster" appeared on numerous best songs of the 2010s decade lists; Stereogum placed it at 28th, Slant Magazine placed it at 25th, Pitchfork placed it at 38th, Parade placed it at 50th, and Uproxx placed it at 100th. Harper's Bazaar named it one of the 35 best songs of the 2010s, saying "it's a six-minute-long masterpiece of rap heaven and hell." Elsewhere, GQ included it its list of 24 songs that shaped the decade, commenting "Minaj's roaring interrogation of her bubblegum alter-ego stole the show". "Monster" was listed as one of seven 2010s songs that should have placed higher in the annual Triple J Hottest 100.

== Chart performance ==
"Monster" was sent to US rhythmic contemporary radio stations on September 21, and it was released to the iTunes Store on October 23, 2010, around Halloween. It spent five weeks on the Billboard Hot 100, peaking at number 18 on the chart. The song also appeared within the top 30 on both the Billboard Hot Rap Songs and Hot R&B/Hip-Hop Songs charts. "Monster" was certified platinum by the Recording Industry Association of America (RIAA) for sales of 1,000,000 certified units on March 31, 2014, becoming West's 11th track to achieve the certification. The song entered the UK Singles Chart at number 146 and went on to peak at number 111 on the chart. As of October 24, 2019, the song stands as West's 27th most successful track of all time on the UK Singles Chart. On December 29, 2017, the song was certified silver by the British Phonographic Industry (BPI) for selling 200,000 copies in the UK.

== Live performances ==
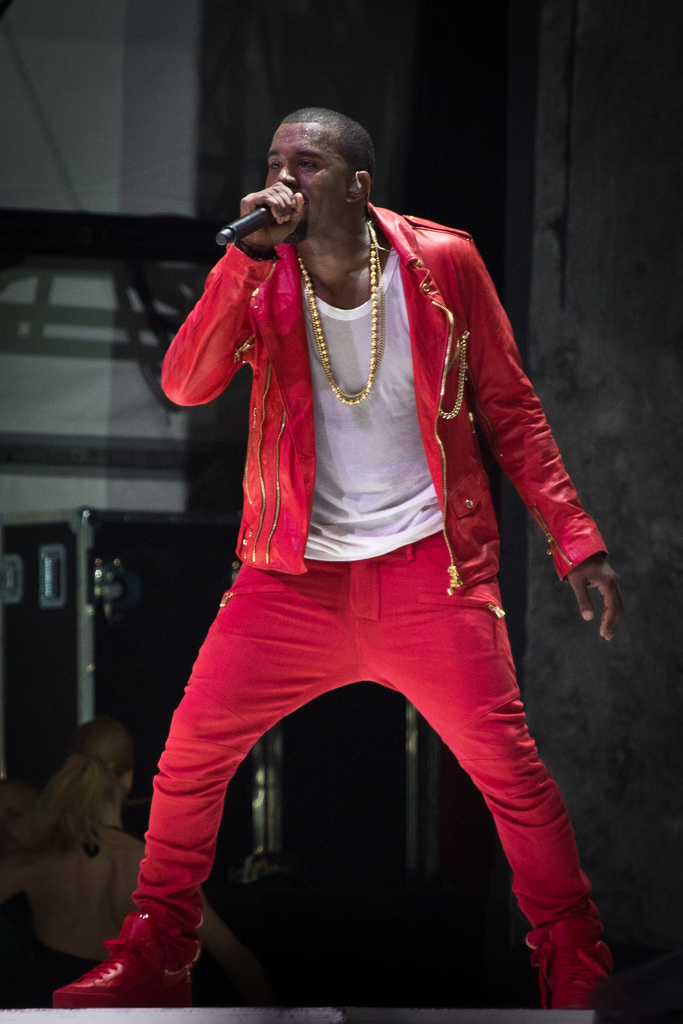
The mostly red outfit worn by West during many of his performances while promoting My Beautiful Dark Twisted Fantasy.

The song was performed at Jay-Z's and Eminem's "Home & Home" concert in the new Yankee Stadium, during Jay-Z's portion of the performance. Both Minaj and West joined Jay-Z at the concert and performed the song together as a group, though Ross was absent. After joining Jay-Z during the performance, West remained on stage and performed his own singles, including the remixed version of "Power", "Can't Tell Me Nothing" and "Good Life". West wore exactly the same outfit he did for his 2010 MTV Video Music Awards performance and his subsequent Saturday Night Live performance; a red suit accessorized with his gold Egyptian god Horus necklace and red Louis Vuitton shoes. During a live performance in New York City, West joined Ross and performed "Devil in a New Dress" and "Monster".

Minaj performed the song live at Britney Spears' Femme Fatale Tour as one of the final songs in her setlist. On one occasion, West performed the track alongside Minaj on the tour, on August 2, 2011, at the Nassau Coliseum in Long Island, New York, as a surprise guest. During his set at the Coachella Valley Music and Arts Festival, West performed "Monster" during the first half of his setlist. The performance was accompanied by Vernon who provided his vocal hook on the song. West's performance was described as "one of the most memorable performances in Coachella history." The song was performed by West and Jay-Z during their Watch the Throne Tour. Minaj has also performed her verse on the European and American legs of her debut concert tour, the Pink Friday Tour. She has rapped her verse on her Pink Friday: Reloaded Tour. She has also rapped her verse on her European tour, the Nicki Wrld Tour.

== Music video ==
=== Background and synopsis ===
An unfinished version of a music video, directed by Jake Nava leaked online before the official release on December 30, 2010. West was annoyed at the leak of the video, and nearly shelved the video altogether. A finalized version of the video was officially released on June 4, 2011, on West's official website. A promotional trailer for the music video was released online. When released, the video came with a disclaimer, stating "the following content is in no way to be interpreted as misogynistic or negative towards any groups of people. It is an art piece and it shall be taken as such."

The music video is inspired by horror films and extensively features gothic and horror related imagery, including references to Michael Jackson's Thriller. The video features references to horror cult films such as American Psycho and Saw as well as the supposedly haunted painting The Hands Resist Him. The Hand Resists Him is a painting created by artist Bill Stoneham in 1972, depicting a young boy and female doll standing in front of a glass paneled door against which many hands are pressed. The painting became famous for apparently being haunted. The painting is referenced during a scene in the video where Kanye West attempts to hold a door closed, from the monsters outside attempting to enter. The video features mostly naked corpse looking models, some of which are decapitated. West's role in the video is similar to Doctor Frankenstein, with the video set in a castle. Jay-Z appears in the video dressed in a tuxedo, standing in front of a nude corpse in a darkly-lit library. Zombies appear in the video, with hanging corpses and blood-splattered furniture.

The video also contains the duality of Minaj; Harajuku Barbie (born January 7, 1995) and Roman Zolanski (born August 23, 1989). Roman reveals his real form; a naturally curly long black-haired demon in a black gothic outfit. He is a dominatrix in this video. Barbie reveals her real form; a naturally straight long banged neon pink-haired angel in a white bridal dress. However, she is a damsel in distress in this video. This is because Roman kidnapped Barbie. He tortures her while they both rap Minaj's dialogued verse. Blac Chyna is Minaj's double.

=== Reception ===
HitFix's Melinda Newman called the video both "chilling" and "raw" and stated that the video captured the concept of the song well, expressing that it was a "brutal reveal of West's psyche". Simon Vozick-Levinson of Entertainment Weekly stated that the video should have been more creative and called it offensive, stating that Minaj's appearance was the best part. Matthew Perpetua of Rolling Stone commented that the video was morbid, comparing it to "Thriller", though noted that "instead of dancing zombies, he gives us undead, barely dressed and occasionally dismembered models". Perpetua called Minaj's appearance "cameo of the year" describing her appearance in the video:

A screenshot of one of the scenes in the video described as disturbing. West rearranges the bodies of two seemingly dead models in a bed with satin sheets.

"She switches up her delivery repeatedly over the course of 31 bars, veering between cartoonish sweetness and unhinged villainy. She dramatizes the jarring dynamic shifts in the clip by appearing as a fanged dominatrix torturing a far more innocent version of herself in a neon pink wig and frilly white dress. It's a brilliant visual take on a breathtakingly badass verse, but really, they could've just focused in on her incredible facial expressions and called it a day. She's just that entertaining to watch."

The music video for "Monster" was widely controversial, being banned on MTV. Ta-Nehisi Coates of The Atlantic questioned "what would have become of John Mayer, had he cut a video with dead black women strewn about and invoked black women throughout his lyrics in the manner Kanye does" and labeled the video both racist and sexist in nature. However, Brandon Soderberg of Spin argues that the video was simply a "surreal response to hip-hop misogyny" and a "knowing provocation", and commented that the video was in fact inspired by horror films.

Daphne Bramham of the Vancouver Sun commented that "what's entertaining about women in lingerie hanging by their necks on chains? What's artful about images of drugged, unconscious women about to be sexually assaulted?" Mikhail Lyubansky of the Huffington Post had a negative opinion of the video, stating that the video "not-so-subtly suggests that complete female passivity, lifelessness, and even death are erotic", and interpreted the message of the video as being that "for women, what's sexually desirable is passivity, lifelessness, and death." The release of the video was received by American activist Ann Simonton with an internet petition seeking the preemptive removal of the full video from broadcast or promotion, criticizing the video as glorifying sexual violence against women.

== In other media ==
Minaj's verse has been praised by fans and music critics alike, with multiple celebrities including Demi Lovato, Chloë Grace Moretz, Ed Sheeran, Kim Petras and Troye Sivan rapping her verse in concerts or interviews. In January 2016, singer Adele rapped Nicki Minaj's verse on The Late Late Show with James Corden during a segment called "Carpool Karaoke", which Minaj reacted to with praise. British actress Millie Bobby Brown rapped the same verse while on The Tonight Show with Jimmy Fallon in September 2016. In 2017, British singer Ed Sheeran attempted to rap the verse during an interview on The Breakfast Club, but forgot the words to it.

The song was featured in the 2011 film The Hangover Part II as well as the ABC sitcom Black-ish. The song was remixed for the trailer of the second season of The Witcher. Minaj herself later performed the song during her medley performance for the Michael Jackson Video Vanguard Award at the 2022 MTV Video Music Awards.

== Credits and personnel ==
- Produced by Kanye West
- Additional Production by Mike Dean and Plain Pat
- Recorded by Andrew Dawson, Anthony Kilhoffer and Mike Dean at the Avex Recording Studio, Honolulu
- Mixed by Mike Dean at Electric Lady Studios and Glenwood Place Studios, Burbank – Assisted by Gaylord Holomalia, Christian Mochizuki and Pete Bischoff
- Background Vocals: Justin Vernon
- Piano: Jeff Bhasker

== Charts ==
=== Weekly charts ===
Chart (2010)	Peak position
Canada Hot 100 (Billboard)	43
UK Singles (Official Charts Company)	111
UK Hip Hop/R&B (Official Charts)	32
US Billboard Hot 100	18
US Hot R&B/Hip-Hop Songs (Billboard)	30
US Hot Rap Songs (Billboard)	15

Chart (2016)	Peak position
Australia (ARIA)	91

== Certifications ==
Region	Certification	Certified units/sales
Denmark (IFPI Danmark)	Gold	45,000^{‡}
New Zealand (RMNZ)	Platinum	30,000^{‡}
United Kingdom (BPI)	Platinum	600,000^{‡}
United States (RIAA)	3× Platinum	3,000,000^{‡}
^{‡} Sales+streaming figures based on certification alone.

== Release history ==
Region	Date	Format
United States	September 21, 2010	Rhythmic radio
United States	October 23, 2010	Digital download
