= Hell of a Life (Kanye West song) =

2010 song by Kanye West

Song by Kanye West

from the album My Beautiful Dark Twisted Fantasy
- Released: November 22, 2010
- Recorded: 2010
- Genre: Hip-hop; rap rock
- Length: 5:27
- Label: Roc-A-Fella; Def Jam
- Songwriters: Kanye West; Mike Caren; Ernest Wilson; Mike Dean; Sylvester Stewart; Tony Joe White; Terence Butler; Anthony Iommi; John Osbourne; William Ward
- Producers: Kanye West; Mike Caren; No I.D.; Mike Dean

"Hell of a Life" is a song by the American rapper Kanye West from his fifth studio album, My Beautiful Dark Twisted Fantasy (2010). The song was produced by West, Mike Caren, No I.D. and Mike Dean. The song features a number of samples and contains backing vocals by Teyana Taylor, signed to West's G.O.O.D. Music label. The song features a production style with influence from rock and heavy metal music, and is notably bombastic and aggressive in nature. The song expresses a narrative about West marrying a pornographic film actress and the traumatic events that follow. It employs highly sexual, nightmarish imagery and was inspired by West's relationship with model Amber Rose, among other real-life events.

"Hell of a Life" was later certified Gold by the Recording Industry Association of America (RIAA) for equivalent sales of 500,000 units in the US. In reviews of My Beautiful Dark Twisted Fantasy, the song garnered critical acclaim, who noted the song for its sexual subject matter and praising the performance provided by West and the aesthetically pleasing imagery created by the song. The song was featured in multiple festivals where West performed in 2011 and 2012, and briefly appeared in his short film Runaway, during a dinner sequence.

== Background ==
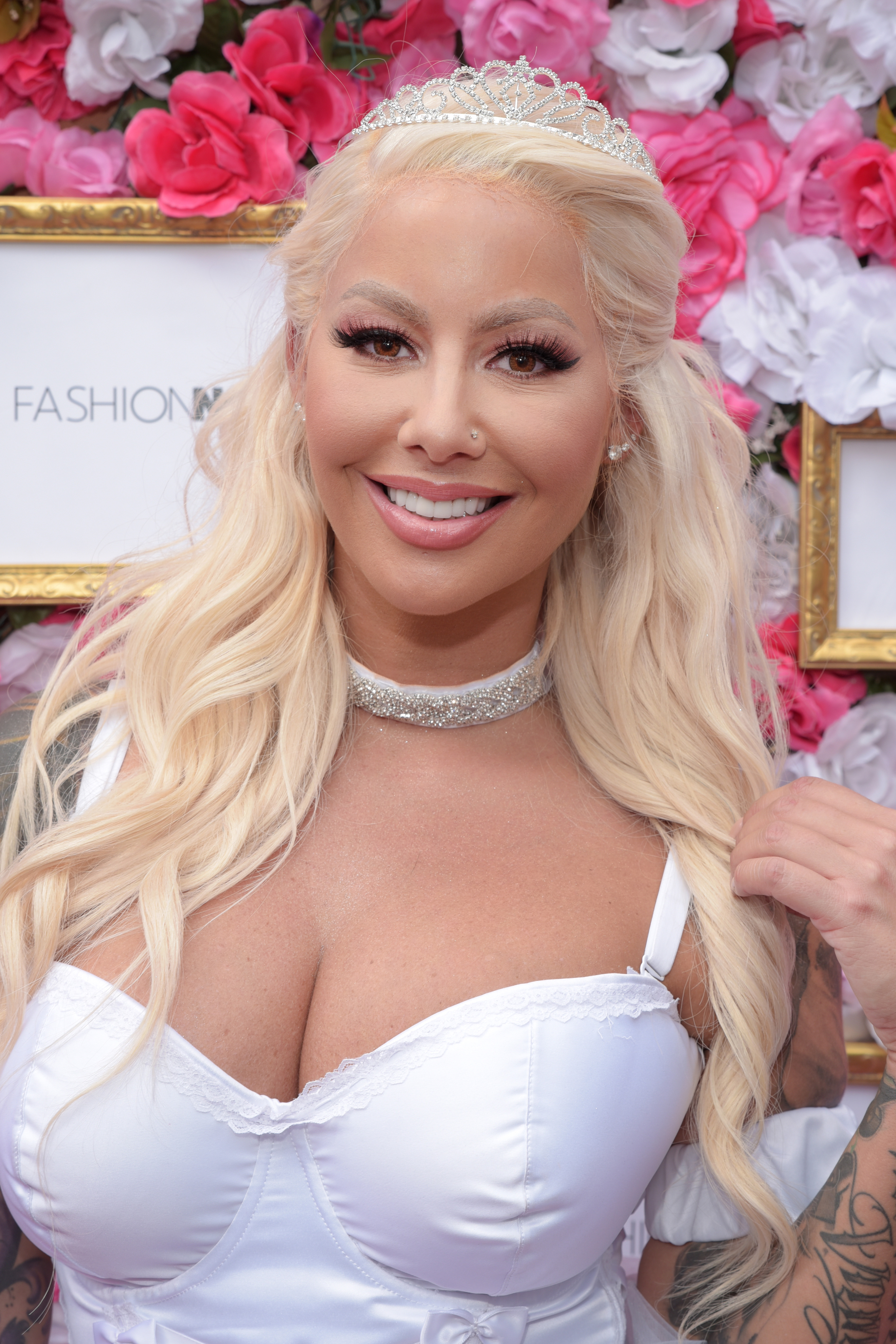
"Hell of a Life" lyrically draws from West's former relationship with Amber Rose.

"Hell of a Life" was recorded at Avex Recording Studios in Honolulu, Hawaii, along with the majority of My Beautiful Dark Twisted Fantasy. It was also mixed at Electric Lady and Platinum Sound Recording in New York City, with additional recording taking place at the former location. West had faced various media controversies and expressed a desire to record his next album in a reclusive manner, straying away from collaborating with artists he didn't consider himself personally familiar with.

The track takes inspiration from "Iron Man", a song first recorded by British heavy metal band Black Sabbath from their second studio album Paranoid, which is also sampled in the song. Another source of musical influence that the track drew from was Kraftwerk, an influential electronic music project from the 1970s. G.O.O.D. Music artist Teyana Taylor contributes backing vocals to the song, primarily within the last minute of the track.

Lyrically the song draws from West's relationship with model Amber Rose. West had first gotten into contact with Rose in 2008 and developed a romantic relationship with her. The couple had a dramatic break-up in 2010, due to allegations of adultery. The song is unique among songs featured on My Beautiful Dark Twisted Fantasy as it is the only song on the album featuring vocals solely provided by West, who chose to otherwise collaborate extensively on the project.

== Composition ==
"Hell of a Life"
A sample of West talking about "falling in love with a porn star" over the abrasive production.

"Hell of a Life" tells the story of the marriage between West and a porn star. The porn star in question has been interpreted as an allusion to Amber Rose, a former stripper. Along with "Iron Man", the song samples "She's My Baby", by Sylvester Stewart, and performed by the Mojo Men; and "Stud-Spider" by Tony Joe White. It is inspired by psychedelic rock, and features baroque braggadocio inspired rapping delivered by West. Aesthetically the production of the song draws from both stoner rock and progressive rock. It has been described as "feverish", "nightmarish", "grimy" and "grotesque" in nature. The primarily bombastic production is littered with heavy synths and brooding, abrasive riffs. The song expresses West's thoughts on relations and features highly sexual themes and imagery, sneering at people who judge him negatively. During the song's climax, West muses "how could you say, 'They live their life wrong?" before launching into the repeated refrain of "when you never fuck with the lights on?" The melodic, riff-ridden chorus is sung by West, boasting about how "pussy and religion is all [he] need[s]."

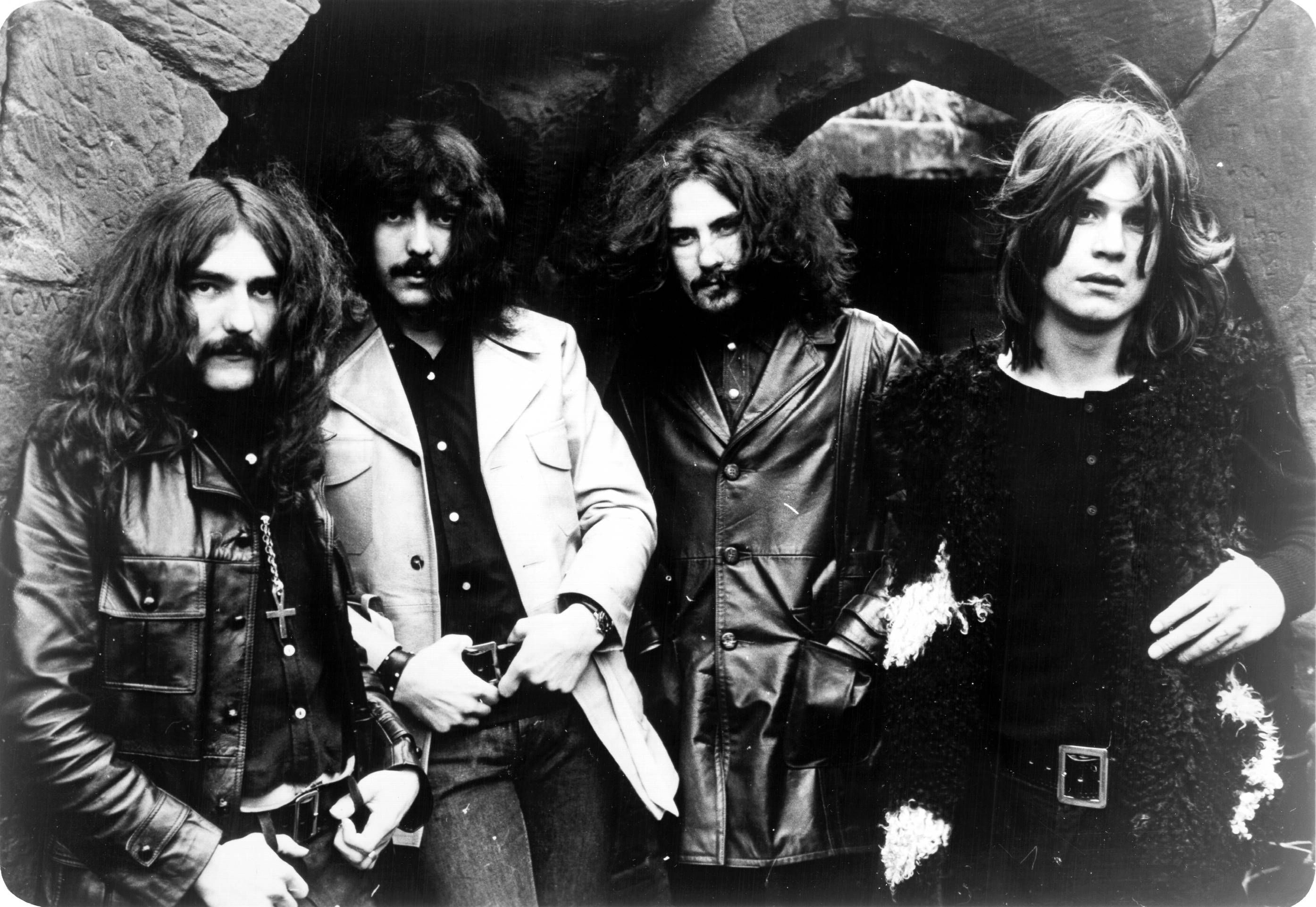
"Hell of a Life" heavily interpolates Black Sabbath's "Iron Man"

Pitchfork's Ryan Dombal summarized the song as an attempt to frame its central credo—"no more drugs for me, pussy and religion is all I need"—as a noble pursuit. He noted that, over a heavy synth line, West justifies his desire not only to sleep with but to marry a porn star. Dombal highlighted the lyric "How can you say they live they life wrong / When you never fuck with the lights on" as a combative peak in the song. He also wrote that the track, inspired by West's relationship with Rose, blurs distinctions between fantasy and reality, sex and romance, and love and religion. According to Dombal, these boundaries ultimately dissolve entirely. He concluded that the song presents a fragile, illusory nirvana undermined by darker elements, which is poised to collapse on "Blame Game". According to IGN's Chad Grischow, the track is fueled by "the fuzzed-out synth and melody borrowed from Black Sabbath's 'Iron Man'," stating that "Hell of a Life" plays like it was inspired by "the latest season of Entourage, as Kanye falls hard for a porn star and spins rapidly out of control as he plans their future."

== Critical reception ==
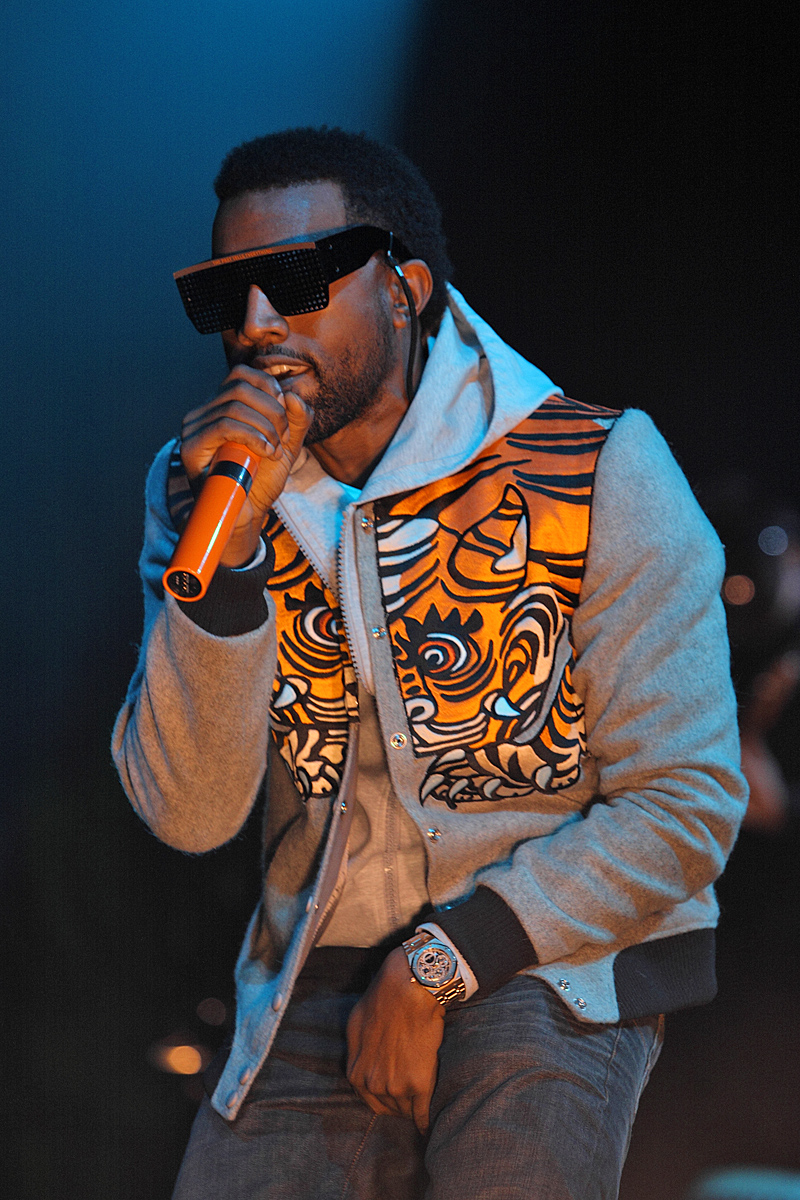
The production of the song by West was widely cited as a highlight.

"Hell of a Life" garnered critical acclaim. David Amidon of PopMatters commented that much like every song on My Beautiful Dark Twisted Fantasy, the song "contains an underscore as ambitious as the beats upfront", concluding that tracks "Hell of a Life" and "So Appalled" alone "carry enough auditory sugar to make listening to this album on any regular sort of listening device almost a fool's errand." Chicago Sun-Times writer Thomas Conner cited the song as one of the album's "temporary highs" describing it as a "mixture of metal strut, Gothic keyboards and a bender gone off the rails." Andy Gill of The Independent cited "Hell of a Life" as a highlight of My Beautiful Dark Twisted Fantasy, describing the song as a "brutal rumination on West's sexual appetite" and stating that it contained a "buzzy synth motif" and "racing minimalist keyboard flourishes".

J. Tinsley of the Smoking Section considered "Hell of a Life" to be an admirable effort by West, but commented that it was one of the lesser tracks on the album ultimately. Sean Highkin of the website Beats Per Minute cited the sampling of "Iron Man" as one of the album's most ambitious moments, writing that "any time Kanye has to make a choice between under and overdoing something, he always opts for the latter". Baron Zach of The Village Voice praised the story and production of the song, stating that the song contained a "great" sample. On July 6, 2022, "Hell of a Life" was certified Gold by the Recording Industry Association of America (RIAA) for selling 500,000 digital units.

== Promotion and live performances ==
"Hell of a Life" was featured in Runaway, a 35-minute music video directed by West set to music from My Beautiful Dark Twisted Fantasy. The beginning of the song is featured at the end of the dinner sequence. West debuted the song live as part of the entire album at Bowery Ballroom in New York, on November 23, 2010, in which he performed the song with Justin Vernon of folk band Bon Iver, a musician who West had extensively collaborated with on the album. Vernon sang the chorus while West provided the rapping verses. The song appeared in multiple festival set lists throughout 2011 and 2012, including SXSW, Coachella, Party in the Garden, Austin City Limits, and Ovation Hall. In August 2024, "Hell of a Life" was featured on the set list of the Vultures Listening Experience at the Goyang Stadium in Goyang, South Korea.

== Personnel ==
Credits are adapted from the liner notes for My Beautiful Dark Twisted Fantasy (2010).

=== Locations ===
- Recorded at Avex Recording, Honolulu, Hawaii
- Recorded and mixed at Electric Lady Studios, New York City
- Mixed at Platinum Sound Recording, New York City

=== Musicians ===
- Kanye West – vocals, writing, production
- Mike Dean – writing, co-production, keyboards, mixing
- Mike Caren – writing, co-production
- Ernest Wilson – writing, co-production
- Teyana Taylor – additional vocals
- The-Dream – additional vocals
- Terence Butler – writing ("Iron Man")
- Anthony Iommi Jr. – writing ("Iron Man")
- John Osbourne – writing ("Iron Man")
- William Thomas Ward – writing ("Iron Man")
- Sylvester Stewart – writing ("She's My Baby")
- Tony Joe White – writing ("Stud-Spider")

=== Technical ===
- Pete Bischoff – assisted mixing
- Andrew Dawson – mixing, recording
- Noah Goldstein – recording
- Gaylord Holomalia – assisted mixing
- Anthony Kilhoffer – drum programming, mixing, recording
- Christian Mochizuki – assisted mixing

=== Samples ===
- Contains portions of "Iron Man", performed by Black Sabbath and written by Terence Butler, Anthony Iommi Jr., John Osbourne, and William Thomas Ward
- Contains a sample from "She's My Baby", performed and written by Sylvester Stewart
- Contains a sample from "Stud-Spider", performed and written by Tony Joe White

== Certifications ==
Region	Certification	Certified units/sales
United States (RIAA)	Gold	500,000^{‡}
^{‡} Sales+streaming figures based on certification alone.
