= The 27s: The Greatest Myth of Rock & Roll =

2008 book by Eric Segalstad

- Coverpage of The 27s: The Greatest Myth of Rock & Roll
- Author: Eric Segalstad
- Illustrator: Josh Hunter
- Language: English
- Subject: Rock music
- Genre: Biography
- Publisher: Samadhi Creations
- Publication date: October 27, 2008
- Pages: 312
- ISBN: 978-0-615-18964-2

The 27s: The Greatest Myth of Rock & Roll is a 2008 book about the 27 Club, authored by Eric Segalstad and illustrated by Josh Hunter. Structured as a non-fiction narrative, it tells the history of rock & roll as seen through the lives and legacies of 34 musicians who all died at the age of 27. It was independently published, and distributed by Random House.

== Summary ==
The book covers the lives of Robert Johnson, Brian Jones, Jimi Hendrix, Janis Joplin, Jim Morrison, Kurt Cobain and more than two dozen other musicians in an illustrated history, including 22 original portraits.

The book's storyline covers the history of rock in a largely linear fashion, although The 27s can also be read at random, with detours into the philosophy of Friedrich Nietzsche as it applies to music, numerology, astrology, and the claim that more rock stars have died at 27 than at any other age.

== Illustrations ==
The book's illustrator, Josh Hunter, told The Huffington Post that, "The artwork tells its own story as well. There are these other layers, these hidden symbols and cryptic messages that, if you're alert to them, you're going to find we're packing in as well."

== The 27s in the book ==
- Alexandre Levy
- Louis Chauvin
- Robert Johnson
- Nat Jaffe
- Jesse Belvin
- Rudy Lewis of The Drifters
- Malcolm Hale of Spanky and Our Gang
- Brian Jones of The Rolling Stones
- Alan Wilson of Canned Heat
- Jimi Hendrix
- Janis Joplin
- Arlester "Dyke" Christian of Dyke and the Blazers
- Jim Morrison of The Doors
- Ron "Pigpen" McKernan of the Grateful Dead
- Roger Lee Durham of Bloodstone
- Wallace Yohn of Chase
- David Michael Alexander of The Stooges
- Pete Ham of Badfinger
- Gary Thain of Keef Hartley Band and Uriah Heep
- Helmut Köllen of Triumvirat
- Chris Bell of Big Star
- D. Boon of the Minutemen
- Pete de Freitas of Echo & the Bunnymen
- Mia Zapata of The Gits
- Kurt Cobain of Nirvana
- Kristen Pfaff of Janitor Joe and Hole
- Richey James Edwards of Manic Street Preachers
- Fat Pat
- Freaky Tah of Lost Boyz
- Sean McCabe of Ink & Dagger
- Maria Serrano Serrano of Passion Fruit
- Jeremy Ward of De Facto and The Mars Volta
- Bryan Ottoson of American Head Charge
- Valentin Elizalde

== Accolades ==
The 27s won silver in the 2009 Independent Publisher Book Award for Popular Culture.
