= The 1984 Suite =

Compilation album by Mike Oldfield
- Released: 29 January 2016
- Recorded: 1984 (mixed in 2014–2015)
- Genre: Pop rock; progressive rock
- Length: 37:38
- Label: Mercury; Virgin EMI
- Producer: Mike Oldfield

Mike Oldfield chronology
Man on the Rocks (2014)	The 1984 Suite (2016)	Return to Ommadawn (2017)

The 1984 Suite is a remix compilation album by the British musician Mike Oldfield, released on 29 January 2016 by Mercury/Virgin EMI. The compilation pulls together tracks from his two 1984 studio albums; Discovery and The Killing Fields. The album is available as part of the Discovery deluxe edition or as a standalone vinyl LP but not as a standalone CD. It has also been released in 5.1 Surround Sound as part of the Discovery deluxe set.

The album features two previously unreleased tracks: "The Royal Mile", which is labelled as a newly rediscovered track from the 1984 period, but is in fact a re-worked version of "Afghan", a B-side of "Tricks of the Light"; and "Zombies", a reworking of the song "Poison Arrows" with the original vocals replaced by robotic "Stephen Hawking" style vocals with the lines "Somebody's out to get you" replaced with "Zombies are out to get you". Oldfield said in the deluxe edition liner notes, "My boys were going through a zombie phase ... and I had the idea to remake the song about zombies that are out to get you. It is really for kids and for Halloween." The album also contains a slightly longer version of "The Lake" than the version on Discovery. All tracks were newly re-mixed from the original multitrack tapes.

The track "Zombies" was released as a digital single on 31 October 2015 with a new promotional video.

== Track listing ==
All tracks are written by Mike Oldfield, except "Étude"" by Francisco Tárrega, arranged by Oldfield.

1. "To France" – 4:47
2. "The Lake" – 13:42
3. "The Killing Fields" – 2:44
4. "Étude" – 4:37
5. "The Royal Mile" – 3:36
6. "Zombies" – 3:45
7. "Discovery" – 4:27

== Personnel ==
Credits are adapted from album liner notes.

- Maggie Reilly – vocals
- Barry Palmer – vocals
- Simon Phillips – drums, original production and engineering
- Mike Oldfield – all other instruments, production, mixing, original production and engineering
- Paschal Byrne – mastering
- Rupert Lloyd – cover illustration
- Phil Smee – art direction
