= Rotten Apple (album) =

Studio album by Lloyd Banks
- Released: October 10, 2006
- Recorded: 2005–2006
- Genres: Hip hop; East Coast hip-hop
- Length: 61:56
- Labels: G-Unit; Interscope
- Producers: 10 for the Triad; 50 Cent (exec.); 9th Wonder; Chad Beatz; Chris Styles; Daniel Jones; Dave Morris; Eminem; Havoc; Jermaine Mobley; Luis Resto; Machavelli; Major Music Productions; Midi Mafia; Needlz; Nick Speed; Prince; Ron Browz; Sha Money XL (also co-exec.); Writer's Block Music Group; Young RJ & T3; Younglord

Lloyd Banks chronology
The Hunger for More (2004)	Rotten Apple (2006)	H.F.M. 2 (The Hunger for More 2) (2010)

Singles from Rotten Apple
- 1. "Hands Up" Released: September 3, 2006

Rotten Apple is the second studio album by American rapper Lloyd Banks, released October 10, 2006 via G-Unit and Interscope. The title of the album is a play on the New York City nickname, "The Big Apple". 50 Cent's song "Rotten Apple" is on his mixtape Guess Who's Back? (2002) and should not be confused with Banks' song of the same name on this album. Rotten Apple Entertainment is also the name of Banks' former label owned by 50 Cent in the past. The album cover also resembles the cover of the film, King of New York.

== Background ==
The Big Withdrawal was originally intended to be Lloyd Banks' second album. However, two women Banks had a threesome with in 2005 leaked an unmastered copy of the album he had left at their home. The album was scrapped and soon after, Banks began working on Rotten Apple.

The album featured guest appearances from 50 Cent, Tony Yayo, Young Buck, Rakim, Scarface, Mobb Deep, 8Ball, Keri Hilson and Musiq Soulchild. Production on the album was provided by Eminem, Needlz, Sha Money XL, Younglord, Ron Browz, Havoc and 9th Wonder. Banks stated that he wanted to show the darker side of New York City and allow listeners to hear what it was like growing up in South Jamaica, Queens.

== Critical reception ==
Professional ratings
Aggregate scores
Source	Rating
Metacritic	(51/100)
Review scores
Source	Rating
AllMusic	2.5/5 stars
Entertainment Weekly	D+
Los Angeles Times	3/4 stars
The Michigan Daily	2/5 stars
Now	2/5 stars
The Phoenix	1.5/4 stars
RapReviews	(8/10)
Rolling Stone	3/5 stars
Stylus Magazine	C−
Vibe	2.5/5 stars

Rotten Apple received generally mixed reviews from critics. The album so far has a score of 51 out of 100 from Metacritic based on "mixed or average reviews". Rolling Stone's Evan Serpick gave it 3 out of 5 stars and said that "Eminem, Mobb Deep's Havoc and a host of G-Unit regulars produce an album's worth of chunky, ominous beats to fit Banks' foul mood, but it runs a little thin over sixteen tracks." AllHipHop gave it a score of three-and-a-half stars out of five and said that it was "primed to remind folks what crew controlled the game before his hiatus." DJ Booth gave it three stars out of five and said it "doesn't offer the same amount of high energy bangers" as Banks' first album.

But XXL gave it a L/XXL (the equivalent of three stars out of five) and said, "Not falling far from 50 Cent's platinum-rooted tree, Rotten Apple is fertilized with potent doses of sonic strength and catchy hooks. But overall, it isn't the new massacre that'll shake New York hip-hop down to its core." AllMusic's David Jeffries gave it 2.5 out of 5 stars and said that "The highlights are way high, but the album as a whole is fans-only." HipHopDX gave it a similar score of two-and-a-half stars out of five and said, "Much like Banks' rapping, the beats just plod along. It is easy to expect less from some of his less talented G-Unit brethren, but Banks has shown himself to be capable of a lot. Minus a few moments where he shines, this album is as rotten as the City."

After five weeks of sales the album was at number 71 on the Billboard charts with 15,000 copies sold that week and 250,000 copies sold total. Despite not being certified in the United States, the album managed to achieve Gold status in Canada.

== Commercial performance ==
Debuting at number 3 with 143,000, Banks fell more than 40,000 albums short of a chart-topping repeat. The album fell to number 15 the following week with sales of 49,000. In its third week, the album sold 25,000. In its fourth week, the album sold 19,000 to land at number 43 on the album chart. In its fifth week the album sold 15,000 to land at number 71 on the charts.

== Track listing ==
Rotten Apple track listing
No.	Title	Writer(s)	Producer(s)	Length
1.	"Rotten Apple" (featuring 50 Cent and Prodigy)	Kejuan Muchita; Christopher Lloyd; Michael Clervoix; Curtis Jackson; Albert Johnson	Havoc; Sha Money XL^{[a]}	4:27
2.	"Survival"	Ralph Rice II; Lloyd	Young RJ Rice	3:47
3.	"Playboy 2"	Rondell Turner; Lloyd	Ron Browz	3:44
4.	"The Cake" (featuring 50 Cent)	Fatin Horton; Lloyd; Jackson; Hans Bathelt; Hans Jürgen Fritz	10 for the Triad	2:52
5.	"Make a Move"	Kevin Risto; Waynne Nugent; Lloyd	Midi Mafia	4:46
6.	"Hands Up" (featuring 50 Cent)	Marshall Mathers; Luis Resto; Teraike Crawford; Phillip Pits; Lloyd; Jackson	Eminem; Chris Styles; Luis Resto^{[b]}	4:00
7.	"Help" (featuring Keri Hilson)	Turner; Clervoix; Lloyd	Ron Browz; Sha Money XL^{[a]}	3:54
8.	"Addicted" (featuring Musiq Soulchild)	Daniel Jones; Jermaine Mobley; Clervoix; Lloyd	Daniel Jones; Jermaine Mobley	3:00
9.	"You Know the Deal" (featuring Rakim)	Clint Richmond; Johnathon Whitton; Lloyd	Major Music Productions Inc.	4:05
10.	"Get Clapped" (featuring Prodigy)	Khari Cain; Lloyd; Johnson	Needlz	5:01
11.	"Stranger"	Nicholas Speed; Clervoix; Lloyd	Nick Speed	3:10
12.	"Change"	Peter Rogers; Jack Polo; Lloyd	Prince; Machavelli	3:35
13.	"NY NY" (featuring Tony Yayo)	Mathers; Lloyd; Marvin Bernard; Resto; Steve King	Eminem; Resto^{[b]}	3:29
14.	"One Night Stand" (featuring Keon Bryce)	Patrick Douthit; Lloyd; Carolyn Franklin	9th Wonder	3:57
15.	"Iceman" (featuring Young Buck, Scarface & 8Ball)	Dave Morris; Lloyd; David Brown; Brad Jordan; Premro Smith	Dave Morris	5:28
16.	"Gilmore's"	Richard Frierson; Lloyd	Younglord	2:50
Total length:				61:56

Bonus tracks
No.	Title	Writer(s)	Producer(s)	Length
17.	"Life" (featuring Marsha Ambrosius and Spider Loc)	Clervoix; Chad Burnette; Lloyd; Curtis Williams	Sha Money XL; Chad B	4:21
18.	"Lost & Found"	Jana Avery; Adam King; Dallas Leake; Lloyd	Writer's Block Music Group Inc.	4:13

Notes

- ^{^[a]} signifies a co-producer.
- ^{^[b]} signifies an additional producer.

Sample credits

- "The Cake" contains elements from "I Believe", written by Hans Bathelt and Hans Jürgen Fritz, and performed by Triumvirat.
- "One Night Stand" contains elements from "As Long As You Are There", written and performed by Carolyn Franklin.

== Charts ==
=== Weekly charts ===
Chart (2006)	Peak position
Australian Albums (ARIA Charts)	66
Canadian Albums (Billboard)	6
French Albums (SNEP)	65
German Albums (Offizielle Top 100)	51
Irish Albums (IRMA)	27
Scottish Albums (Official Charts)	52
Swiss Albums (Schweizer Hitparade)	36
UK Albums (Official Charts)	40
US Billboard 200	3
US Top R&B/Hip-Hop Albums (Billboard)	1
US Top Rap Albums (Billboard)	1

=== Year-end charts ===
Chart (2006)	Position
US Top R&B/Hip-Hop Albums (Billboard)	79

== Certifications ==
Region	Certification	Certified units/sales
Canada (Music Canada)	Gold	50,000^{^}
^{^} Shipments figures based on certification alone.
