= Helmut Köllen =

West German musician (1950–1977)

- Born: Helmut Köllen; 2 March 1950; Cologne, West Germany
- Died: 3 May 1977 (aged 27); Cologne, West Germany
- Known for: Music
- Notable work: You Won't See Me
- Movement: Rock music

Helmut Köllen (2 March 1950 – 3 May 1977) was a West German bass and guitar player as well as a singer for the band Triumvirat.

== Career ==
=== Early years ===
Early in his musical career, Helmut Köllen gained experience in various local bands in Cologne, West Germany. (Note: "Helmut...played part-time in various Cologne bands." – H. Bathelt. → Schenewerk, Russ. "The Triumvirat Biography". Triumvirat.net.) In the seventies, he became the bassist and vocalist for the progressive rock band Triumvirat, after replacing Hans-Georg Pape (who had just got married), the band's previous bass player, who left the group before the completion of one of their most successful albums, Illusions on a Double Dimple. After the release of that album in 1974, Triumvirat with Helmut Köllen then embarked on a tour of the United States, supporting Fleetwood Mac. In 1975, Köllen got back to the studio along with his fellow musicians to record the concept album Spartacus, and soon after the album, they began another tour of the United States. During that year, Triumvirat also did a tour of Europe, supporting Grand Funk Railroad. At the end of 1975, Köllen left Triumvirat to pursue a solo career, once his own musical inclinations began to drift away from those of the rest of the band.

In 1976, the German group Jail released their only album You Can Help Me, which featured Helmut Köllen as a guest musician on some of the songs (vocals and guitar), including the A-side of the band's single, "Julie". Köllen briefly returned to Triumvirat, but nothing really came of that reunion.

=== Solo album ===
In late 1976, Köllen began recording what would be his only solo album You Won't See Me, named after one of The Beatles' songs that he liked the most. The album featured Helmut Köllen on vocals and guitar (bass, acoustic and electric), and also fellow Triumvirat musician and cousin Jürgen Fritz, (Note: "Helmut was Jurgen's cousin." – H. Bathelt.) who played keyboards, and helped to engineer and produce the album along with then famous German engineer and record producer Conny Plank at "Conny's Studio", Wolperath, West Germany. Other musicians included Dieter Petereit of Passport on bass guitar, (Note: Passport is a German jazz ensemble led by saxophonist Klaus Doldinger) Mathias Holtmann playing drums, and among various backing vocalists like Brigitte Witt and The Horn and String Section, Köllen's sister Elke Köllen. (Note: Today Elke Schlimbach, born Köllen, is an accomplished singer, librettist, and actress) Helmut Köllen continued to record music until his death on 3 May 1977.

=== Television ===
In January 1975, Helmut Köllen appeared with Triumvirat on In Concert, a television show broadcast by ABC, playing music from the Illusions on a Double Dimple album. The host of the show, Don E. Branker, stated that the video from that performance no longer exists.

=== Other important interests ===
Köllen was also an experienced auto mechanic and race driver, (Note: "He was a mechanic." – H. Bathelt.Mineur, Matthias. "Triumvirat". Old Loves Die Hard Liner Notes. J'rat – Triumvirat Japanese Page.) and had plans to continue in this area in the future as well. (Note: "Helmut...would have returned to motor racing, which is what he did before he joined Triumvirat." → Jürgen Fritz)

== Death ==
On 3 May 1977, Köllen died from carbon monoxide poisoning at the age of 27 while listening to some of the studio tracks in his car's cassette player while running the engine in his garage. A little while after his death, the German group Birth Control wrote and recorded a song as a tribute to Helmut Köllen entitled "We All Thought We Knew You", which was featured on their 1977 album Increase. (Note: "Birth Control's Guestbook" – 2 March 2010) His debut solo album You Won't See Me was issued posthumously by Harvest in Germany in October 1977. (Note: "The Musicians – Helmut Köllen.") It is dedicated to Köllen's parents.

== Discography ==
Studio Albums	Year	Chart Position
Illusions on a Double Dimple by Triumvirat	1974	U.S. No. 55
Spartacus – by Triumvirat	1975	U.S. No. 27
You Can Help Me – Jail album	1976	NA
You Won't See Me – Solo album	1977	NA
Triumvirat Singles	Year	Chart Position
"Dancer's Delight" & "Timothy" (7", Single)	1973	NA
"Dimplicity" & "Million Dollars" (7" Single) *2 versions	1974	NA
"The Capitol of Power" B-side (7" Single) Live, LA, USA	August 1975	NA
Unauthorized "Bootleg" Recordings	Year	Chart Position
Triumvirat Live Tour 1974–1975 (songs from shows in the U.S.)	1974–75	NA
Triumvirat – Illusions on a Double Dimple Live – Palace Theatre, Providence, RI, USA	October 1974	NA
Triumvirat – Illusions on a Double Dimple Live – St. Bernard Cultural Center, Chalmette, LA, USA	November 1974	NA
