= Royal Mile (disambiguation) =

The Royal Mile is a succession of streets forming the main thoroughfare of the Old Town of the city of Edinburgh in Scotland.

Royal Mile or The Royal Mile may also refer to:

- "The Royal Mile", track on The 1984 Suite album by Mike Oldfield
- "The Royal Mile (Sweet Darlin')", song on the 1980 Snakes and Ladders (Gerry Rafferty album)
- The Royal Mile, 2013 republished version of Love's Pirate by Mary Daheim
