= Kristen Pfaff =

American musician (1967–1994)

- Pfaff performing with Hole at the Phoenix Festival, England, 1993
- Born: Kristen Marie Parco; May 26, 1967; Buffalo, New York, U.S.
- Died: June 16, 1994 (aged 27); Seattle, Washington, U.S.
- Resting place: Forest Lawn Cemetery
- Education: University of Minnesota
- Occupations: Musician; songwriter
- Years active: 1991–1994

Kristen Marie Pfaff (née Parco; May 26, 1967 – June 16, 1994) was an American musician and songwriter known as a bassist for the alternative rock bands Hole and Janitor Joe. She died in June 1994 of a heroin overdose at the age of 27.

== Early life and career ==
Kristen Marie Parco was born on May 26, 1967, to Janet Pfaff and her first husband, Mike Parco, in Buffalo, New York. Her birth father comes from a family of several highly successful musicians. Her parents divorced when she was a child, and her mother remarried to Norman Pfaff, who adopted Kristen and gave her his surname. She had a younger brother, Jason, a musician. She studied classical piano and cello.

After graduating from Catholic school Buffalo Academy of the Sacred Heart in 1985, Pfaff spent a short time in Europe and briefly attended Boston College before ultimately finishing at the University of Minnesota, majoring in women's studies. There, she also worked as a counselor for rape victims. She was a part of Restore of the Sexual Violence Program, which offered a crisis line, counseling services and training in self-defense programs. Pfaff also took part in the annual 24 Hour Rape Free Zone in 1990, and was quoted as saying the goal was "to draw attention to violence brought against women on campus and in the world". During this time, she participated in the college radio station, Radio K, and she can be heard doing this in a short clip available on SoundCloud.

While living in Minneapolis, Minnesota following her graduation, Pfaff taught herself to play bass guitar. Pfaff, guitarist/vocalist Joachim Breuer (formerly of Minneapolis band "The Bastards") and drummer Matt Entsminger formed the band Janitor Joe in 1991.

=== Janitor Joe ===
The band's first single, "Hmong", was released in 1992. Later that year, they released the "Bullethead" single on picture disc, which was followed in 1993 with the "Boyfriend" 7-inch and Janitor Joe's debut album Big Metal Birds. One Janitor Joe track, "Under The Knife", can also be found on an OXO records 4-track EP, released in 1993.

Janitor Joe were becoming a staple of the Minneapolis sound, influenced by the Pacific Northwest's early grunge sound and by the sharper, faster DC post-hardcore scene, as well as the stop-start distortion of the Butthole Surfers, Big Black and others on the Touch and Go label. Pfaff's playing style was central to Janitor Joe's relentless assault both live and on record, and she and Breuer both contributed songs to Big Metal Birds: "Both operate within easy reach of the line separating punishment and reward - Pfaff's contributions (the surly "Boys in Blue") tend to be slightly more spacious, while Breuer's ("One Eye," for instance) stipulate that drummer Matt Entsminger maintain perpetual motion", wrote David Sprague of Trouser Press.

The growing Minneapolis scene was beginning to attract music press attention in 1993. Amphetamine Reptile released a tour single, "Stinker", and Janitor Joe began to tour nationally. It was on one such tour in California that year that Pfaff was scouted by Eric Erlandson and Courtney Love of Hole, who were at the time looking for a new bassist. Love invited Pfaff to play with Hole; Pfaff declined and returned to Minneapolis, but Erlandson and Love continued to pursue her.

=== Hole ===
Pfaff, initially reluctant to leave Minneapolis and join Hole, reconsidered after advice from her father, Norman: "From a professional point of view, there was no decision", he later told Seattle Weekly, "because they are already on Geffen Records and already have this huge following in England... if you're wanting to move up the ladder, that's the way to go", although Kristen's mother Janet was more reluctant for her daughter to leave Minneapolis and Janitor Joe in favor of Seattle and Hole. Following international critical acclaim for their first, independent album, Pretty on the Inside, Hole had generated a great deal of major-label interest, eventually signing an eight-album deal with Geffen Records for a reported $3 million.

In 1993, Pfaff moved to Seattle, Washington, to work with the other members of Hole on Live Through This, the major-label follow-up to Pretty on the Inside. The band's new line-up – Love, Erlandson, Pfaff and Patty Schemel on drums – entered the studio in early 1993 to begin rehearsals. "That's when we took off," Eric Erlandson said of Pfaff joining. "All of a sudden, we became a real band."

== Later years ==
Pfaff's time in Seattle was a creatively rich period, and she formed close friendships with Eric Erlandson and Kurt Cobain. While working on the platinum selling album Live Through This, Pfaff and Erlandson dated, and stayed together for most of 1993, remaining close even after splitting up. All was not well, however; while living in Washington's 'heroin capital', Pfaff developed a problem with drug use. "Everybody was doing it. Everyone, everyone. All our friends were junkies. It was ridiculous. Everybody in this town did dope", said Love of this period in the Seattle music scene. By most accounts, Pfaff's own drug use was relatively moderate: "Kristen...dabbled in drugs before she was in our band, in Minneapolis, but it was very light", Erlandson told Craig Marks of Spin. "She moved to Seattle and felt disconnected from everything, and she made friends, drug connections, which I told her not to do. The only way you can survive in this town is if you don't make those connections." After the critical acclaim of Hole's Live Through This album, Pfaff decided to move back to Minnesota, partly because of her drug problem and partly because of creative differences within Hole.

Pfaff entered a Minneapolis detox center for heroin addiction in February 1994 and left Hole later that spring, to tour with Janitor Joe. "She went on tour... and when she came back from that, she was clean", says Erlandson. In the wake of Cobain's death in April 1994, Pfaff decided to leave Hole, and return to Minneapolis permanently. After her tour with Janitor Joe, however, Pfaff made plans to return to Seattle in order to retrieve the rest of her belongings, making the trip to Seattle on June 14, 1994.

== Death ==
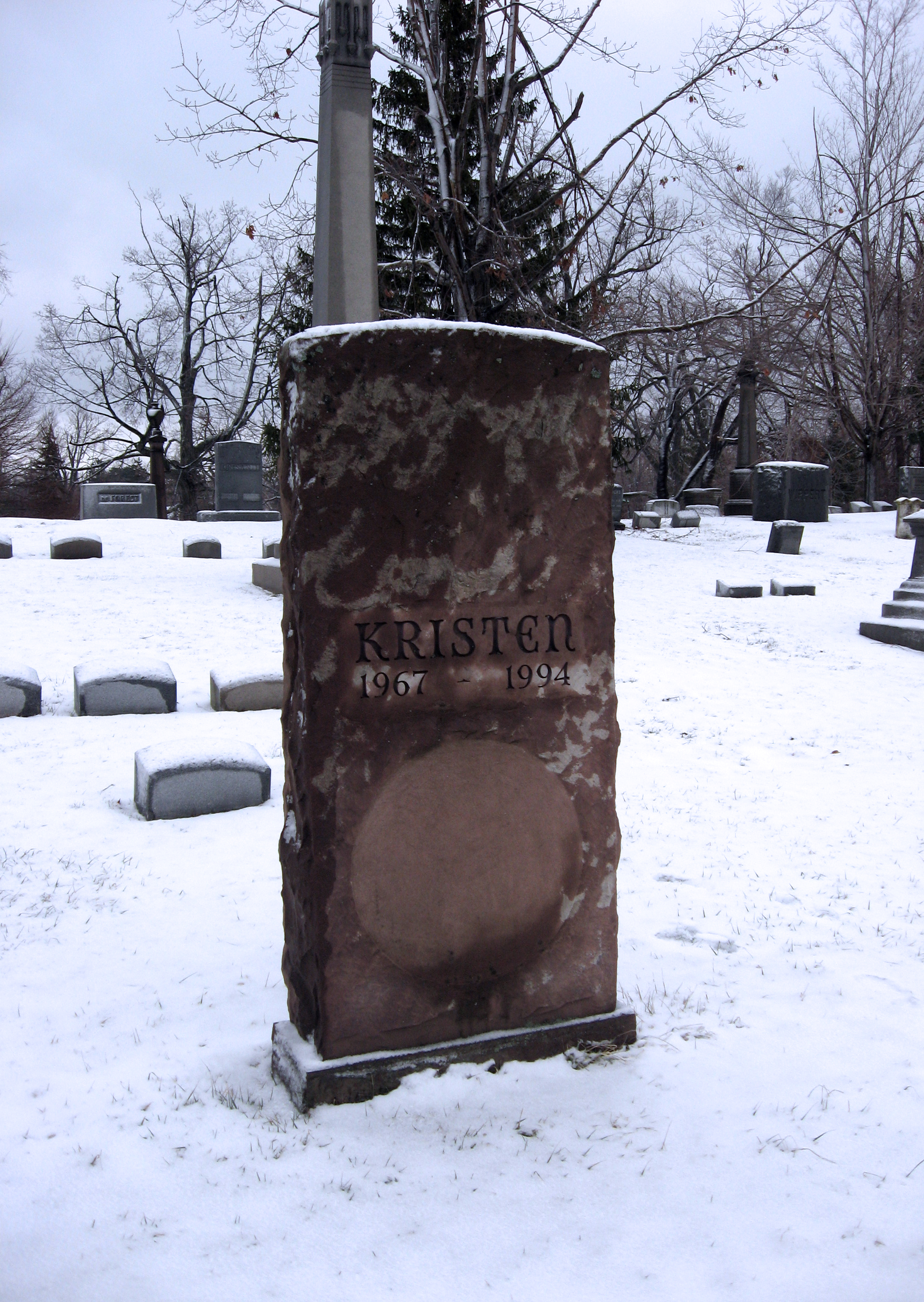
Kristen Pfaff's grave site. Section 6, Lot 45 of Forest Lawn Cemetery, Buffalo, New York

On June 16, 1994, at around 9:30 a.m., Pfaff was found dead in the bathtub of her Seattle apartment by Paul Erickson, a friend with whom she had planned to leave for Minneapolis that day. She was 27 years old. On the floor was a bag containing syringes and drug paraphernalia. Pfaff's death was attributed to "acute opiate intoxication". She died two months after Kurt Cobain, who was a close friend as well as the husband of Hole's frontwoman Courtney Love.

Her father, Norman Pfaff, described her as "bright, personable, wonderful...very, very talented, smart, and she always seemed to be in control of her circumstances. Last night she wasn't." In the book Love & Death, released April 2004, Kristen Pfaff's mother, Janet Pfaff, states she has never accepted the official story regarding her daughter's death.

== Posthumous acknowledgements ==
After a period of mourning, Hole recruited bassist Melissa Auf der Maur and dedicated their first show of an extensive touring period to Pfaff. Hole's 1997 retrospective compilation My Body, the Hand Grenade is also dedicated to Pfaff and Cobain.

On October 20, 1994, Janet Pfaff, Kristen's mother, accepted induction on her daughter's behalf into the Buffalo Music Hall of Fame. "I'm proud to accept this award for Kristen and I know she would be happy to receive it," Mrs. Pfaff said. "It's sad because Kristen wasn't here herself to enjoy the moment. You work so hard in the business to make it at the national level, and that's what Kristen did. I just wish she was here to enjoy it, and see how her hometown feels about her."

A local Minneapolis radio station, University of Minnesota's KUOM, started a yearly $1,000 Memorial Scholarship in her name. The award is earmarked for "individuals active in the arts in the pursuit of their educational goals." Portions from the proceeds of Hole's album sales have gone to the Kristen Pfaff Memorial Fund.

English author Guy Mankowski wrote with Jason Pfaff a biography focusing on her life and her work as an activist, counsellor and musician (drawing from her personal archive) which was the basis of a TEDx talk 'Lived Through This: Kristen Pfaff's hidden archive and influence'.

In November 2024 a 'long-awaited' first volume of a biography about Pfaff was released for subscribers via Substack. John Robb said, ‘This book ultimately places Kristen back in the deserved centre of the narrative.’

== Discography ==
- Big Metal Birds (1993); with Janitor Joe
- Live Through This (1994); with Hole
- My Body, the Hand Grenade (1997); compilation by Hole, bass and backing vocals on "Old Age"
