= Spartacus (Triumvirat album) =

Studio album by Triumvirat
- Released: 1975
- Recorded: 3 February – 4 March 1975
- Studio: EMI-Electrola Studios, Cologne
- Genre: Progressive rock
- Length: 42:31
- Label: Capitol

Triumvirat chronology
Illusions on a Double Dimple (1974)	Spartacus (1975)	Old Loves Die Hard (1976)

Professional ratings
Review scores
Source	Rating
Allmusic	4/5 stars

Spartacus is the third album by the German group Triumvirat. It is a concept album based on Spartacus, the Thracian gladiator who led the 3rd slave uprising in 73–71 BC. The lyrics were written by Hans Bathelt, with contributions by Jürgen Fritz. It was originally released in 1975 on the EMI label, and later distributed in the U.S. by Capitol. It debuted at number 27 on the Billboard album charts.

After this album, Helmut Köllen left the band to start a solo career. Two years later, he died of carbon monoxide poisoning when he was in his car, in the garage, listening to his own compositions on the car's cassette player.

The album was digitally re-mastered and released in CD form in 2002 by EMI. The re-mastered version included two additional tracks: a live version of "The Capital of Power" and a previously unreleased song called "Showstopper".

== Track listing ==
1. "The Capital of Power" (Fritz) – 3:13
2. "The School of Instant Pain" – 6:22
  - "Proclamation" (Fritz, Bathelt)
  - "The Gladiator's Song" (Fritz, Bathelt)
  - "Roman Entertainment" (Fritz, Bathelt)
  - "The Battle" (Fritz, Bathelt)
3. "The Walls of Doom" (Fritz) – 3:57
4. "The Deadly Dream of Freedom" (Köllen, Bathelt) – 3:54
5. "The Hazy Shades of Dawn" (Fritz) – 3:09
6. "The Burning Sword of Capua" (Fritz) – 2:41
7. "The Sweetest Sound of Liberty" (Köllen, Bathelt) – 2:35
8. "The March to the Eternal City" – 8:46
  - "Dusty Road" (Fritz, Bathelt)
  - "Italian Improvisation" (Fritz, Bathelt)
  - "First Success" (Fritz, Bathelt)
9. "Spartacus" – 7:39
  - "The Superior Force of Rome" (Fritz, Bathelt)
  - "A Broken Dream" (Fritz)
  - "The Finale" (Fritz)

Bonus Tracks

1. "The Capital of Power" (live) (Fritz) – 3:17
2. "Showstopper" (Bathelt) – 3:37

== Personnel ==
- Jürgen Fritz – keyboards, grand piano, Hammond organ, Moog synthesizers, string synthesizer, Mellotron
- Helmut Köllen – bass, acoustic guitars, vocals
- Hans Bathelt – drums, percussion, words & lyrics
