= Big Metal Birds =

Studio album by Janitor Joe
- Released: 1993
- Genre: Noise rock, alternative rock, grunge, punk rock
- Length: 37:00
- Label: Amphetamine Reptile Records

Janitor Joe chronology
Big Metal Birds (1993)	Lucky (1994)

Big Metal Birds is the debut album by American noise rock band Janitor Joe. It was released in 1993, on Amphetamine Reptile Records, and was the band's only album to feature bassist Kristen Pfaff, who would leave the band to join Hole later that year, before her death in 1994.

== Critical reception ==
Trouser Press praised "the blue-collar manner in which [the band] rakes through grit-mottled riffs, fashioning a burnished, no-frills end product likely to pique the curiosity of those prone to solicit ear perforation." The Washington Post called the songs "short and punchy, less grinding (though no gentler) than typical AmRep fare," writing that "though not quite sprightly, songs like 'Slur' and the neo-rockabilly 'Goal Oriented' do have a spring in their grunge." Option called the album "classic Amphetamine Reptile ... full of hair-raising guitar grunts, guttural vocals, tree trunk-pounded drums — all slathered with a thick coating of grimy production ethos the color of Guinness Stout."

== Track listing ==
All music is composed by Janitor Joe

No.	Title	Length
1.	"Early Retirement"	3:13
2.	"Voucher"	2:02
3.	"Boyfriend"	2:49
4.	"Limited Edition"	2:19
5.	"One Eye"	3:47
6.	"Big Metal Birds"	3:13
7.	"Boys in Blue"	3:43
8.	"Slur"	2:28
9.	"Steel Plate"	3:05
10.	"Goal Oriented"	3:21
11.	"Sunshine"	2:36
12.	"Head"	2:04
13.	"African Necklace"	3:02
Total length:		37:00

== Personnel ==
- Joachim Breuer – vocals, guitar
- Kristen Pfaff – bass guitar, vocals
- Matt Entsminger – drums
