= Discovery (Mike Oldfield album) =

Studio album by Mike Oldfield
- Released: 25 June 1984
- Recorded: January–June 1984 in Villars-sur-Ollon, Switzerland
- Genres: Progressive rock, pop rock
- Length: 40:57
- Label: Virgin
- Producers: Mike Oldfield; Simon Phillips

Mike Oldfield chronology
Crises (1983)	Discovery (1984)	The Killing Fields (1984)

Singles from Discovery
- 1. "To France" Released: 18 June 1984; 2. "Tricks of the Light" Released: 10 September 1984

Professional ratings
Review scores
Source	Rating
Allmusic	3.5/5 stars

Discovery is the ninth studio album by English multi-instrumentalist and songwriter Mike Oldfield, released on 25 June 1984 on Virgin Records. It comprises a number of pop songs, most notably the single "To France", as well as the instrumental "The Lake".

== Background and recording ==
After his 1983 tour, Oldfield relocated to Villars-sur-Ollon, Switzerland for tax purposes and started work on a new album. The album was recorded from January to June 1984. Sessions typically ran from 10:30 a.m. to around 7 p.m. each day. While living in Villars, Oldfield also composed the soundtrack to The Killing Fields (1984). Selections from the two were released as The 1984 Suite, in 2016.

The album contains a number of pop songs, which Oldfield had been encouraged by Virgin Records to write, following the success of "Moonlight Shadow" from his previous album, Crises.

The first track of the album, "To France", with Maggie Reilly on vocals, seamlessly continues into the second track, "Poison Arrows", sung by Barry Palmer.

According to Oldfield, the instrumental "The Lake" was inspired by his time in Switzerland and around Lake Geneva.

During 1984 Oldfield and his band embarked on a Europe-wide tour in promotion of the album.

=== 2016 reissue ===
Discovery was re-released in a deluxe edition format on 29 January 2016, as per all previous albums which were originally released on the Virgin label.

The reissue comprises 2 CDs (Discovery and the 1984 Suite) and a DVD featuring 5.1 surround sound mixes. The 1984 Suite is a compilation album of Discovery and Oldfield's other 1984 album, The Killing Fields. It also includes two previously unreleased tracks: "The Royal Mile", a slight reworking of the 1984 track "Afghan", and "Zombies (Halloween Special)", a reworking of the song "Poison Arrows" with the original vocals replaced by a "Macintalk" voice named Fred and the lines "Somebody's out to get you" replaced with "Zombies are out to get you".

== Track listing ==
All tracks by Mike Oldfield.

=== Original LP ===
Side one

1. "To France" – 4:37
2. "Poison Arrows" – 3:57
3. "Crystal Gazing" – 3:02
4. "Tricks of the Light" – 3:52
5. "Discovery" – 4:35

Side two

1. "Talk About Your Life" – 4:24
2. "Saved by a Bell" – 4:39
3. "The Lake" – 12:10

=== 2016 Deluxe Edition ===
Disc 1 - Discovery Remastered

1. "To France"
2. "Poison Arrows"
3. "Crystal Gazing"
4. "Tricks of the Light"
5. "Discovery"
6. "Talk About Your Life"
7. "Saved by a Bell"
8. "The Lake"
9. "To France" (Extended version) (bonus track)
10. "In the Pool" (bonus track)
11. "Bones" (bonus track)
12. "Afghan" (bonus track)
13. "Tricks of the Light" (Instrumental) (bonus track)

Tracks 9–11 taken from the "To France" 12 inch single.
Tracks 12–13 taken from B-side of "Tricks of the Light" single.

Disc 2 - The 1984 Suite CD

1. "To France"
2. "The Lake"
3. "The Killing Fields (Main Theme)"
4. "Étude"
5. "The Royal Mile" (Re-discovered track)
6. "Zombies (Halloween Special)" (Reworking of "Poison Arrows" with new vocal)
7. "Discovery"

Disc 3 - DVD

- The 1984 Suite in 5.1 Surround Sound
- Promotional videos
  - "To France"
  - "Tricks of the Light"
  - "Étude"

== Personnel ==
- Mike Oldfield – all instruments (except drums), producer
- Maggie Reilly – vocals (1, 3, 4, 6)
- Barry Palmer – vocals (2, 4, 5, 7)
- Simon Phillips – drums, producer
- Dan Kramer – cover photography

== Charts ==
=== Weekly charts ===
Weekly chart performance for Discovery
Chart (1984)	Peak position
Austrian Albums (Ö3 Austria)	3
Canada Top Albums/CDs (RPM)	44
Dutch Albums (Album Top 100)	2
European Albums (European Top 100 Albums)	1
German Albums (Offizielle Top 100)	1
New Zealand Albums (RMNZ)	47
Norwegian Albums (VG-lista)	3
Scottish Albums (Official Charts)	68
Spain (PROMUSICAE)	1
Swedish Albums (Sverigetopplistan)	3
Swiss Albums (Schweizer Hitparade)	1
UK Albums (Official Charts)	15

=== Year-end charts ===
1984 year-end chart performance for Discovery
Chart (1984)	Position
Austrian Albums (Ö3 Austria)	12
Dutch Albums (Album Top 100)	33
German Albums (Offizielle Top 100)	6
Swiss Albums (Schweizer Hitparade)	5

=== Certifications ===
Sale certifications for Discovery
Region	Certification	Certified units/sales
France (SNEP)	Gold	
Germany (BVMI)	Gold	250,000^{^}
Spain (Promusicae)	Platinum	100,000^{^}
United Kingdom (BPI)	Gold	100,000^{^}
^{^} Shipments figures based on certification alone.
