= Pompeii (Triumvirat album) =

Studio album by Triumvirat
- Released: 1977
- Recorded: Conny's Studio, West Germany; 14 January – 11 July 1977
- Genre: Progressive rock
- Length: 44:36
- Label: Capitol
- Producer: Jürgen Fritz

Triumvirat chronology
Old Loves Die Hard (1976)	Pompeii (1977)	A la Carte (1978)

Professional ratings
Review scores
Source	Rating
Allmusic	3/5 stars

Pompeii is the fifth album by German progressive rock group Triumvirat. The album was released using the band name "New Triumvirat" due to temporary legal squabbles over using the name "Triumvirat" from former members, drummer Hans Bathelt and bassist Dick Frangenberg, who had been replaced by drummer Curt Cress and bassist Dieter Petereit, both from the band Passport.

This would be the band's last progressive album due to pressure from the record company to make more commercial music to enhance record sales.

== Track listing ==
1. "The Earthquake 62 A.D." (Fritz) – 6:18
2. "Journey of a Fallen Angel" (Fritz) – 6:15
3. "Viva Pompeii" (Cress, Fritz, Petereit) – 4:16
4. "The Time of Your Life" (Sondra and Jürgen Fritz) – 4:35
5. "The Rich Man and the Carpenter" (Fritz) – 5:57
6. "Dance on the Volcano" (Fritz) – 3:31
7. "Vesuvius 79 A.D." (Fritz) – 6:40
8. "The Hymn" (Fritz) – 7:04

Bonus Track

1. "The Hymn" (Fritz) (Single Version) – 4:13

== Personnel ==
- Hans-Jürgen Fritz - keyboards, Hammond organ, piano, electric piano, Moog synthesizer, string synthesizer
- Barry Palmer - vocals
- Dieter Petereit - bass guitars
- Curt Cress - drums, percussion
