= Old Loves Die Hard =

Studio album by Triumvirat
- Released: 1976
- Recorded: Electrola Studios, Cologne; 5 January – 6 April 1976
- Genre: Progressive rock
- Length: 48:36
- Label: Capitol
- Producer: Jürgen Fritz

Triumvirat chronology
Spartacus (1975)	Old Loves Die Hard (1976)	Pompeii (1977)

US Cover
- The original cover of Old Loves Die Hard

Professional ratings
Review scores
Source	Rating
Allmusic	3/5 stars

Old Loves Die Hard is the fourth album by German progressive rock group Triumvirat. It was their first recording as a four-piece band with British singer Barry Palmer. It was also their last album with original bassist Dick W. Frangenberg and original drummer/lyricist Hans Bathelt.

The album was released in the United States, Canada and some other markets with a different cover from the European and compact disc editions. It features a cornered mouse seen through a magnifying glass.

== Track listing ==
1. "I Believe" (Fritz, Bathelt) – 7:51
2. "A Day in a Life" (Fritz) – 8:09
  - "Uranus' Dawn" – 2:57
  - "Pisces at Noon" – 3:51
  - "Panorama Dusk" – 1:21
3. "The History of Mystery" (Fritz, Bathelt, Palmer) – 11:49
4. "A Cold Old Worried Lady" (Fritz, Palmer) – 5:50
5. "Panic on Fifth Avenue" (Fritz) – 10:31
6. "Old Loves Die Hard" (Fritz) – 4:26

Bonus Track

1. "Take a Break Today" (Single) – 3:47

== Personnel ==
- Jürgen Fritz – keyboards, Hammond organ, piano, electric piano, mini Moog synthesizer, string synthesizer
- Barry Palmer – lead vocals
- Dick W. Frangenberg – bass guitar
- Hans Bathelt – drums, percussion
