= Illusions on a Double Dimple =

Studio album by Triumvirat
- Released: 1974
- Recorded: EMI-Electrola Studios, Cologne; June–October 1973
- Genre: Progressive rock
- Length: 44:32
- Label: Harvest
- Producer: Jürgen Fritz

Triumvirat chronology
Mediterranean Tales (1972)	Illusions on a Double Dimple (1974)	Spartacus (1975)

Professional ratings
Review scores
Source	Rating
Allmusic	4.5/5 stars

Illusions on a Double Dimple is the second album by the German progressive rock group Triumvirat. It was a breakthrough for the band, which started to open shows in a U.S. tour for Fleetwood Mac. Triumvirat played the album in its entirety, and the tour resulted in increased popularity for the band in a number of countries, popularity which would further increase with their next release, Spartacus.

== Track listing ==
1. "Illusions on a Double Dimple" – 23:11
  - "Flashback" (Fritz, Bathelt) – 0:54
  - "Schooldays" (Fritz, Bathelt) – 3:20
  - "Triangle" (Fritz) – 6:55
  - "Illusions" (Fritz, Bathelt) – 1:40
  - "Dimplicity" (Fritz, Bathelt) – 5:28
  - "Last Dance" (Fritz) – 4:42
2. "Mister Ten Percent" – 21:21
  - "Maze" (Fritz) – 3:01
  - "Dawning" (Fritz) – 1:01
  - "Bad Deal" (Fritz, Bathelt) – 1:36
  - "Roundabout" (Fritz) – 5:43
  - "Lucky Girl" (Köllen, Bathelt) – 5:16
  - "Million Dollars" (Fritz, Bathelt) – 5:23

Bonus Tracks (released together as a single):

1. "Dancer's Delight" – 3:32
2. "Timothy" – 4:08
3. "Dimplicity (edit)" – 3:15
4. "Million Dollars (edit)" – 2:35

== Personnel ==
- Jürgen Fritz – Hammond organ, electric and Steinway grand piano, Moog synthesizer, Mellotron, producer, arranger
- Hans-Georg Pape – bass on illusions on a Double Dimple
- Helmut Köllen – bass, acoustic & electric guitars on Mister Ten Percent, vocals on both sides
- Hans Bathelt – drums, percussion, lyrics

== Session musicians ==
- The Cologne Opera House Orchestra – orchestra
- Kurt Edelhagen Brass Section – brass
- Brigitte Thomas, Hanna Dölitzsch, Ulla Wiesner – backing vocals
