= Mediterranean Tales =

Studio album by Triumvirat
- Released: April 1972
- Recorded: Electrola Studios, Cologne; January 1972
- Genre: Progressive rock, classical music
- Length: 37:40
- Label: Harvest
- Producer: Rainer Pietsch

Triumvirat chronology
| Mediterranean Tales (1972) | Illusions on a Double Dimple (1974) |

Professional ratings
Review scores
| Source | Rating |
|---|---|
| Allmusic | 4.5/5 stars |

Mediterranean Tales (Across the Waters) is the debut album of German progressive rock group Triumvirat.

== Track listing ==
Side one
| No. | Title | Writer(s) | Length |
|---|---|---|---|
| 1. | "Across the Waters: "Overture" (W. A. Mozart, arr. Fritz) – 2:35; "Taxident" (Fritz, Bathelt) – 3:03; "Mind Tripper" (Fritz) – 4:04; "5 O'Clock Tea" (Fritz, Bathelt) – 2:55; "Satan's Breakfast" (Fritz) – 2:31; "Underture" (W. A. Mozart, arr. Fritz) – 1:23" | W. A. Mozart, Fritz, Bathelt | 16:31 |

Side two
| No. | Title | Writer(s) | Length |
|---|---|---|---|
| 2. | "Eleven Kids" | Fritz, Bathelt | 6:00 |
| 3. | "E Minor 5/9 Minor/5" | Fritz | 7:55 |
| 4. | "Broken Mirror" | Fritz | 7:14 |
| Total length: | | | 37:40 |

Bonus tracks
| No. | Title | Length |
|---|---|---|
| 5. | "Be Home for Tea" | 3:40 |
| 6. | "Broken Mirror (Single Edit)" | 3:25 |
| 7. | "Ride in the Night" | 4:29 |
| 8. | "Sing Me a Song" | 4:42 |
| Total length: | | 53:56 |

== Personnel ==
- Jürgen Fritz – Hammond B3 organ, electric piano, grand piano, Moog synthesizer, vocals on Eleven Kids, vocals & chorus on Broken Mirror
- Hans-Georg Pape – bass, lead vocals, except on Eleven Kids, vocals & chorus on Broken Mirror
- Hans Bathelt – drums, percussion, words & lyrics
