= A la Carte (Triumvirat album) =

Studio album by Triumvirat
- Released: 1978
- Recorded: 5 May – 5 September 1978
- Genre: Pop rock, progressive rock
- Length: 44:55
- Label: Harvest
- Producer: Jürgen Fritz

Triumvirat chronology
Pompeii (1977)	A la Carte (1978)	Russian Roulette (1980)

Professional ratings
Review scores
Source	Rating
AllMusic	2/5 stars

A la Carte is the sixth full-length studio album by German progressive rock band Triumvirat, released in 1978.

== Track listing ==
1. "Waterfall" (Jürgen Fritz) – 4:48
2. "Late Again" (Fritz) – 6:48
3. "Jo Ann Walker" (Fritz) – 4:46
4. "For You" (Fritz) – 5:53
5. "I Don't Even Know Your Name" (Fritz) – 4:47
6. "A Bavarian in New York" (Fritz) – 5:38
7. "Original Soundtrack from the Movie O.C.S.I.D." (Fritz, Matthias Holtmann, Werner Kopal) – 3:48
8. "Darlin'" (Mike Love, Brian Wilson) – 3:46
9. "Good Bye" (Fritz) – 4:28

Bonus Tracks included on the 2002 reedition.

1. "Waterfall" (Single Version) – 3:38
2. "Jo Ann Walker" (Single Version) – 3:48

== Personnel ==
- Hans-Jürgen Fritz – keyboards, Hammond organ, Moog synthesizer, piano, electric piano
- David Hanselmann, Barry Palmer (1, 5, 8) – lead vocals
- Ed Carter, Wolfgang Maus – guitar
- Buell Neidlinger, Steve Edelman, Werner Kopal – bass
- Charly Schlimbach, Michael Andreas – saxophone
- Matthias Holtmann – drums, marimba, wood block, bell tree, tambourine, timbales
- Malando Gassama – bell tree, tambourine, timbales, cabasa, shaker, tambourine, vibraslap, cowbell, congas, maracas, voice
- Diana Lee, Marty McCall, Myrna Matthews – backing vocals

== Orchestra & Chorus ==
- Bonnie Douglas, Brian Leonard, John Wittenberg, Ken Yerke, Linda Rose, Mari Tsumura, Michelle Grab, Peter Kent, Robert Dubow, Robert Lipsett, Spiro Stamof – Violins
- Dan Neufels, Denise Buffom, Linda Lipsett, Sam Bogossian – Violas
- Fred Seykora, Glenn Grab, Gloria Strassner, Juliana Buffom – Cellos
- Jene Cipriano, Bob Hardaway, Tommy Johnson – Tuba
- Bill Lamb, Mark Isham, Richard Hurwitz – Trumpet
- Randy Alcroft, Vinnie Fannele – Trombone
- Alan Robinson, Marie Robinson – French Horn
- Bill Cole, Jules Chaikin – Contractor
- Gordon Marron – Conductor
- Israel Baker – Concertmaster
- Allan Davies, Darice Richman, David Hanselmann, Diana Lee, Fred Frank, Gene Merlino, Gene Moredro, Gloria G. Prosper, Jackie Ward, Jan Gassman, Jerry Whitman, Jon Osbrink, Karen Kenton, Larry Kenton, Linda Harmon, Myrna Matthews, Peggy Clark, Rob Stevens, Sally Stevens, Stan Farber, Sue Allen, Susie McCyne, Terry Stilwell, Walt Harrah, Bill Brown – Chorus
