= Triumvirat =

German progressive rock band

- Origin: Cologne, West Germany
- Genres: Progressive rock, symphonic rock
- Years active: 1969–1980, 2002
- Labels: Harvest, Capitol
- Past members: Hans-Jürgen Fritz; Hans Bathelt; Werner "Dick" Frangenberg; Hans Georg-Pape; Helmut Köllen; Barry Palmer; Dieter Petereit; Curt Cress; David Hanselmann; Mattias Holtmann; Werner Kopal; Arno Steffen
- Website: www.triumvirat.net

Triumvirat was a West German progressive rock band from Cologne in then-West Germany. They became, during the 1970s, a key figure in Eurock, the progressive rock of continental Europe whose German variant is called krautrock. The name Triumvirat comes from the Latin word triumvirate, which refers to a group of three powerful individuals.

Members of the original band were Hans-Jürgen Fritz (aka Jürgen Fritz) on keyboards, Werner Frangenberg on bass and vocals, and drummer-percussionist-lyricist Hans Bathelt. However, that line-up would be in a constant state of flux over the band's career, with each album featuring at least one different member.

The band was often criticized for the similarity of their sound to British band Emerson, Lake and Palmer, something that band members may have had in mind when they wrote the song "Lucky Girl" for their Illusions on a Double Dimple album, perhaps in response to one of ELP's greatest hits "Lucky Man".

== History ==
=== Beginnings (1969–1972) ===
The group was formed in 1969 in Cologne, Germany. They became known by playing chart hits in local clubs around town. Heavily influenced by the musical style of The Nice and Emerson, Lake and Palmer, they incorporated some of these bands' songs into their repertoire, like Rondo (The Nice) and Hoedown (ELP). They eventually abandoned cover versions and started composing their own music, still with a strong Keith Emerson influence for keyboard sounds that is most evident in the prominent use of the Hammond organ. At the height of their glory, the band was often called a clone of ELP by the specialized press, not only because of the similarity of their music and the sound of their keyboards, but also because of keyboardist Fritz's virtuosity and classical training.

=== First recordings (1972–1975) ===
In 1972, the trio sent a demo to the EMI Group, and signed their first recording contract. The group then produced their first album, Mediterranean Tales in 1972, consisting of two full-side suites. Just before entering the studio, bassist Frangenberg had left the band, to be replaced by Hans-Georg Pape to handle bass duties as well as vocals, with notable exceptions on the song "Eleven Kids", sung by Fritz, who also delivers two verses in the song "Broken Mirror".

Bassist-singer Pape left the band to get married. He was replaced by Helmut Köllen, a young guitarist-bassist-singer and Fritz's cousin. Köllen was already working with the band as a sound technician.

They returned to the studio in 1973 to produce their second album, Illusions on a Double Dimple with the Cologne Opera House Orchestra, Kurt Edelhagen's brass section and Karl Drewo's saxophone for the "Mister Ten Percent" suite, as well as a chorus composed of Ulla Wiesmer, Brigitte Thomas, and Hanna Dölitzsch. The resulting album showcased the work of both bassists, with Pape playing bass on most of side one's "Illusions on a Double Dimple" suite, and Köllen playing bass and guitar on side two's "Mister Ten Percent" suite. Köllen handled vocals for the entire album.

The album was listed at position 45 in Rolling Stone's 2015 list of 50 Greatest Prog Rock Albums of All Time.

They undertook a European and American tour at the end of 1974 and into 1975, opening for Fleetwood Mac in the United States. The set consisted of an excerpt from Mediterranean Tales' "Across the Waters" suite followed by the Illusions on a Double Dimple album in its entirety.

=== Spartacus and Old Loves Die Hard (1975–1977) ===
In 1975, the trio began recording their third album, Spartacus, a retelling of the story of the famed Roman slave and Thracian gladiator in the year 73 BC. The lyrics were written by drummer Hans Bathelt, with the help of keyboardist Fritz and the album was released on EMI / Electrola, distributed in America by Capitol Records. The album debuted at number 27 on the Billboard album chart.

The US tour of Spartacus included many dates opening for Supertramp. Triumvirat was very well-rehearsed, and often out-shone Supertramp on the tour. They also had an element of fun in their live shows that was rare for a prog band.

After the album release, Helmut Köllen left to pursue a solo career. He began recording his first solo album with the help of Fritz on keyboards and Hans Bathelt for lyrics on one of the songs, "The Story of Life". He did return to the band, who had already composed new songs, but this return was cut short, among other reasons because the new songs no longer suited his tone of voice. He then dedicated himself to his new solo career, which was also cut short when he died on May 3, 1977, at 27 years old, making him a member of the 27 Club. He was listening to a demo tape of his future solo album on his car radio in his garage while the engine was running and died from carbon monoxide poisoning. His completed album would be released posthumously two years later after his death under the title You Won't See Me on the Harvest Records label and dedicated to his parents.

The Köllen album included a Beatles song (the title-track), which he was fond of, and another whose lyrics were written by Triumviurat's drummer, "The Story of Life". Musicians present on the album include, among others, Hans-Jürgen Fritz on keyboards, Brigitte Witt on choirs who would later take part in the New Triumvirat band, as well as Helmut's sister, Elke Köllen also on chorus. Matthias Holtmann played drums while Köllen handled guitar, bass and vocals. Köllen also featured as a guest on songs by the group Jail, including a single called "Julie" in 1976. Shortly after his death, the German group Birth Control recorded and published a song in tribute to the bassist, entitled "We All Thought We Knew You", on their album Increase produced in 1977.

Triumvirat replaced Köllen with British singer Barry Palmer and calling on their original bassist Werner Frangenberg to record their next album Old Loves Die Hard, released in 1976. The album's American cover would be the last to feature the iconic white rat that had become the group's mascot since their second album. Other markets featured a text-only cover.

=== Pompeii and À la Carte (1977–1979) ===
In 1977, bassist Frangenberg and drummer-lyricist Hans Bathelt left the band, which called on Curt Cress on drums (from the German band Passport) and bassist Dieter Petereit for the album Pompeii. After temporary legal quarrels between the keyboardist Hans-Jürgen Fritz and the drummer Hans Bathelt concerning the name of the group, the album was released under the new name of New Triumvirat. It would be the last album to contain prog-rock; the rest of their discography would not be the same style. This was the main reason for the departure of drummer and lyricist Hans Bathelt, dissatisfied with the direction taken by Hans-Jürgen Fritz and pressure from the record company, which pushed the group towards a more commercial pop music sound.

The next album released in 1978, À la Carte, had little or nothing to do with the band of previous years, due to the pressures of the record company that wanted more sales from the group. As the last original member, the other musicians on the album being merely contract players, Fritz did not feel able to protest, and the result was this album that sold less than the previous ones. Changes of personnel for this album comprised Barry Palmer's replacement on vocals by David Hanselmann, Werner Kopal taking bassist Dieter Petereit's place, and Curt Cress giving way to drummer Matthias Holtmann.

=== Russian Roulette and separation (1980) ===
The band's last album Russian Roulette was released in 1980, with Toto members Steve Lukather on guitar and bass and drummer Jeff Porcaro (who had also played with Steely Dan) plus other studio musicians. But the album dissatisfied keyboardist Fritz who subsequently disbanded the group.

=== Solo Projects ===
In 1987, Barry Palmer produced a maxi single titled "Shimmering Gold" (Max Version) / "Shimmering Gold" (Single Version) / "Cold Nights", co-produced by Hans-Jürgen Fritz and Andreas Martin Krause; Fritz also wrote the lyrics of "Shimmering Gold", whilst the music was composed by Eugen Römer. It was released on Titan Records.

In 1989, Hans-Jürgen Fritz released the soundtrack album for the movie Es ist nicht leicht, ein Gott zu sein (known as Hard to Be a God in English), on the CBS Records label. The last song, "Hard to Be a God", was sung by Grant Stevens, the rest of the album being instrumental. The film was by Peter Fleischmann, based on a screenplay by Peter Fleischmann and Jean-Claude Carrière, with Edward Zentara and Werner Herzog. Then in 1990, he released his only solo album, again on Columbia Records in Europe, and Sony in America, in the Millennium collection, entitled Dreams of Amadeus with Ralf Hildenbeutel, in which the music is based on Mozart themes.

=== Aborted return and reissue of their discography ===
Since 2002, according to the band's official website, Triumvirat had to be back with a project called The Website Story, which they recorded in 1999, with songs written in partnership with Fritz and John Miles; the project remains unpublished for lack of interest from record companies.

In 2012, EMI released the Essential compilation with songs from their seven albums. Note that all their albums, including their latest Russian Roulette have been reissued in 2002 with additional titles, previously only available in singles, special mention for Illusions on a Double Dimple which is adorned with a different cover.

== Personnel ==
- Hans-Jürgen Fritz - Keyboards (1969–1980, 2002)
- Werner Frangenberg - Bass (1969, 1976)
- Hans-Georg Pape - Bass, lead vocals (1969–1973)
- Hans Bathelt - Drums, percussion (1969–1976)
- Helmut Köllen - Bass, guitars, lead vocals (1973–1975)
- Barry Palmer - Lead vocals (1976–1978)
- Dieter Petereit - Bass (1977–1978)
- Curt Cress - Drums (1977–1979)
- David Hanselmann - Lead vocals (1978–1979)
- Werner Kopal - Bass (1978–1979)
- Matthias Holtmann - Drums (1978–1979)
- Arno Steffen - Lead vocals (1980)

== Line-ups ==
Period	Members	Releases
Early 1969 – March 1971	Jürgen Fritz – keyboards; Hans Bathelt – drums; Dick W. Frangenberg – bass	none
March 1971 – June 1973	Jürgen Fritz – keyboards; Hans Bathelt – drums; Hans Pape – bass, vocals	Mediterranean Tales (1972); "Be Home for Tea/Broken Mirror" single (1972); "Ride in the Night/Sing Me a Song" single (1973)
June 1973 – January 1976	Jürgen Fritz – keyboards; Hans Bathelt – drums; Helmut Köllen – bass, vocals	"Dancer's Delight/Timothy" single (1973); "Dimplicity/Million Dollars" single (1974); Illusions on a Double Dimple (1974); Spartacus (1975)
January 1976 – January 1977	Jürgen Fritz – keyboards; Hans Bathelt – drums; Dick W. Frangenberg – bass; Barry Palmer – vocals	"Take a Break Today/The Capitol Of Power" single (1976); Old Loves Die Hard (1976)
January 1977 – May 1978	Jürgen Fritz – keyboards; Barry Palmer – vocals; Curt Cress – drums; Dieter Petereit – bass	Pompeii (1977); "The Hymn/Dance On The Vulcano" single (1978)
May 1978 – September 1979	Jürgen Fritz – keyboards; Barry Palmer – vocals; David Hanselmann – vocals; Malando Gassama – drums; Werner Kopal – bass	A la Carte; "Waterfall/Jo Ann Walker" single (1978); "For You/Darlin'" single (1978)
September 1979 – April 1980	Jürgen Fritz – keyboards; Arno Steffen – vocals; with: Jeff Porcaro - drums; Steve Lukather - bass	Russian Roulette (1980); "Party Life/Games'" single (1980); "Come with Me/We're Rich on What We've Got" single (1980)
Band inactive 1980–1999
October 1999 – September 2002	Jürgen Fritz – keyboards; Wolf Simon – drums; T. M. Stevens – bass; Grant Stevens – vocals; John Miles – vocals; John Davis – vocals	The Website Story (2002) – unreleased

== Discography ==
=== Triumvirat ===
==== Albums ====
- 1972: Mediterranean Tales/Across The Waters (reissued in 2002 with four bonus songs, "Be Home for Tea", "Broken Mirror", "Ride in the Night" and "Sing Me a Song")
- 1974: Illusions on a Double Dimple (reissued in 2002 with four bonus songs, "Dancer's Delight", "Timothy", "Dimplicity" and "Million Dollars")
- 1975: Spartacus (reissued in 2002 with two bonus songs, "The Capital of Power (live)" and "Showstopper")
- 1976: Old Loves Die Hard (reissued in 2012 with a bonus of two songs "Take a break today" and "The Capitol of Power")
- 1977: Pompeii (reissued in 2002 with bonus song "The Hymn")
- 1978: À la Carte (reissued in 2002 with the two songs "Waterfall" and "Jo Ann Walker")
- 1980: Russian Roulette (reissued in 2002 with a bonus song: "The Ballad of Rudy Törner")

==== Singles ====
- "Be Home for Tea" / "Broken Mirror" (1972) Harvest – 1C 006-29 976
- "Ride in the Night" / "Sing Me a Song" (1973) Harvest – 1C 006-30 407, EMI Electrola – 1C 006-30 407 U
- "Dancer's Delight / "Timothy" (1973) Harvest – 1C 006-30 484, EMI Electrola – 1C 006-30 484
- "Dimplicity" / "Million Dollars" (1974) Harvest, EMI Electrola - 1C 006-30 576
- "Take a Break Today" / "The Capitol of Power" (1976) Harvest, EMI Electrola 1C 006-31 609
- "The Hymn" / "Dance on the Volcano" (1978) Harvest – 1C 006-32 548, EMI Electrola – 1C 006-32 548
- "Waterfall" / "Jo Ann Walker" (1978) Harvest, EMI Electrola 1C 006-45 189
- "For You" / "Darlin'" (1978) Harvest – 31c 006 31149
- "Party Life" / "Games" (1980) Harvest, EMI Electrola 1C 006-45 918
- "Come with Me" / "We're Rich on What We've Got" (1980) EMI – 006-4607
- "Let the Chips Lay Down" (2002)

==== Compilations ====
- The Gold Collection (1995)
- The Best of Triumvirat (1995) EMI Gold 853658 2
- Veni, Vidi, Vici (2000)
- Essential (2012) EMI – 50999 6 44353 2 9
- The Best Of The Gold Collection - Novo - Date of release unknown

==== Bootlegs ====
- Triumvirat - Illusions on a Double Dimple Live - Palace Theatre, Providence, USA October 1974.
- Triumvirat - Illusions on a Double Dimple Live - St. Bernard Cultural Center, Chalmette, LA, USA November 1974,
- Triumvirat - Live from Ultrasonic - Recorded in Studio Ultrasonic, Hempstead, New York, October 1, 1974.
- Triumvirat - Live Tour 1974-75 - American Tour 1974 - 75.

=== Participation ===
- 1971: Lieder by Kurt Demmler - Label: AMIGA - 8 55 236; Hans-Georg Pape participated in the composition of the music and made the arrangements for the song Die Jazzmusik Des Fabian Scheinemann.

=== Curiosities ===
- 1992: "Basement Arrangements" by Kemélions; The piece "Liquid Dots Of Kaos" contains samples taken from "Illusions on a Double Dimple".
- 2003: Beg for Mercy by G-Unit; The piece "G-Unit" contains samplings of the song "Million Dollars" by Triumvirat.
- 2006: Rotten Apple by Lloyd Banks; The piece "The Cake" contains samples of the piece "I believe" by Triumvirat.

=== Solo albums ===
==== Helmut Köllen ====
- You Won't See Me (1977)
- With collaboration from Hans-Jürgen Fritz on keyboards & production and help from drummer Hans Bathelt for lyrics on The story of life.

==== Hans-Jürgen Fritz ====
===== Albums =====
- Es Ist Nicht Leicht Ein Gott Zu Sein (1989) - CBS – 466250 - Original Movie Score for the film It's hard to be a god starring Werner Herzog.
- Millenium - Dreams Of Amadeus (1990) Columbia – COL 468863 2, Sony Music – 468863 2 - Music based on themes from Wolfgang Amadeus Mozart.

===== Singles =====
- Ohne Moos Nix Los/Keiner Kümmert Sich Um Mich (1982) - Synth Pop
- Nix-Keiner Kümmert Sich Um Mich (1982) - Synth Pop

=== Various compilations with other bands and musicians ===
- 2007: Krautrock (Music For Your Brain) Vol. 2; Spartacus is featured on the German six-CD collection released in 2007 on Target Music - Target Music: 06007 5300659 7.
- 2009: Krautrock (Music For Your Brain) Vol. 4; The Illusions On A Double Dimple sequel is on this German six-CD set - Target Music: 30059.
- 2013: Krautrock (Music For Your Brain) Vol. 5; "The School of Instant Pain" is on this box set German compilation, again with six CDs - Target Music: 013659-30060.

=== Collaborations ===
- 1972: Tanned Leather's Child of Never Ending Love - Hans-Jürgen Fritz plays the piano as a guest of the German band.
- 1977: Eric Burdon's Soul Survivor - Fritz plays keyboards with John Bundrick and Zoot Money, Alexis Korner and Geoff Whitehorn on guitar, and singers P.P. Arnold and Maggie Bell
- 1981: Do Not Stop's The Satin Whale Show - Fritz plays grand piano on "Too Late". Palmer sings the album.
- 1984: Fly Dirt's Gladbacher Freunde - Fritz was a technician in addition to mixing, and then collaborated on the composition of the title song with Hans Bathelt and Fly Dirt drummer Burkhardt Unrau.
- 1986 and 1987 - Bad Boys Blue's Heartbeat and Love is No Crime - Fritz on keyboards and arrangements.
- 1988 - Bad Boys Blue's My Blue World - Fritz arrangements
- 1992: Basement Arrangements from Keméleons - Label: Zoo Street - 72445-11047-2; Fritz and Bathelt wrote the music for Liquid Dots of Kaos.
