= Hands Up (Lloyd Banks song) =

Single by Lloyd Banks featuring 50 Cent

from the album Rotten Apple
- Released: July 25, 2006
- Recorded: 2006
- Studio: Main recording: Gang Green Studios (Long Island, NY); Additional recording: 54 Sound (Ferndale, MI)
- Genre: Hip hop
- Length: 4:04
- Label: G-Unit; Interscope
- Songwriters: Christopher Lloyd; Curtis Jackson; Marshall Mathers; Teraike Crawford; Phillip Pits; Luis Resto
- Producers: Eminem; Chris Styles; Bang Out; Luis Resto (add.)

Lloyd Banks singles chronology
"My House" (2006)	"Hands Up" (2006)	"The Cake" (2006)

50 Cent singles chronology
"Have a Party" (2006)	"Hands Up" (2006)	"The Cake" (2006)

Music video
- "Hands Up" on YouTube

"Hands Up" is a song by American rapper Lloyd Banks featuring fellow G-Unit member 50 Cent on the chorus. It was released via G-Unit/Interscope Records on July 25, 2006 digitally and on September 18, 2006 as the lead CD single from his second solo studio album Rotten Apple. Recording sessions took place at Gang Green Studios in Long Island with additional recording at 54 Sound in Ferndale. Production was handled by Eminem, Chris Styles and Bang Out, with Luis Resto serving as additional producer.

In the United States, the song peaked at number 84 on the Billboard Hot 100, number 65 on the Radio Songs, number 30 on both the Hot R&B/Hip-Hop Songs and the Rhythmic, number 31 on the R&B/Hip-Hop Airplay, number 15 on the Hot Rap Songs, number 91 on the Pop 100 and number 47 on the European Hot 100 Singles charts. The song also reached number 53 in Austria, number 20 in Germany, number 26 in Ireland, number 49 in Scotland, number 43 on the UK singles chart and number 4 on the UK Hip Hop/R&B Singles charts.

== Music video ==
The accompanying music video, directed by Jessy Terrero, debuted on BET. It was filmed in an old warehouse, which had been turned into a club, and features cameo appearances from 50 Cent, Tony Yayo and Mobb Deep. The video premiered on BET's Access Granted and later as a digital download on July 28, 2006. The music video on YouTube has received over 76,7 million views as of November 2024.

== Track listing ==
CD single
No.	Title	Length
1.	"Hands Up" (Album Version)
2.	"Hands Up" (Instrumental)

Enhanced CD maxi single
No.	Title	Writer(s)	Producer(s)	Length
1.	"Hands Up" (Album Version)	Christopher Lloyd; Curtis Jackson; Marshall Mathers; Teraike Crawford; Phillip Pits; Luis Resto	Eminem; Chris Styles; Bang Out; Luis Resto (add.)
2.	"Hands Up" (Instrumental)
3.	"Cake"	Lloyd; Jackson; Fatin Horton	10 For The Triad
4.	"Hands Up" (Video)

12" vinyl
No.	Title	Writer(s)	Length
1.	"Hands Up" (Album Version)
2.	"My House" (Album Version)	Lloyd; Jackson; Timothy Mosley
3.	"Hands Up" (Instrumental)

== Personnel ==
- Christopher "Lloyd Banks" Lloyd — songwriter, vocals
- Curtis "50 Cent" Jackson — songwriter, vocals
- Marshall "Eminem" Mathers — songwriter, producer, mixing
- Teraike "Chris Styles" Crawford — songwriter, producer
- Phillip "Bang Out" Pits — songwriter, producer
- Luis Resto — songwriter, keyboards, additional producer
- Steve King — guitar, bass, mixing
- Carlisle Young — recording
- Michael Strange — additional recording, mixing
- Tony Campana — additional recording

== Charts ==
Chart (2006)	Peak position
Austria (Ö3 Austria Top 40)	53
European Hot 100 Singles (Billboard)	47
Germany (GfK)	20
Ireland (IRMA)	26
Scottish Singles Sales (Official Charts)	49
UK Singles (Official Charts)	43
UK Hip Hop/R&B (Official Charts)	4
US Billboard Hot 100	84
US Radio Songs (Billboard)	65
US Hot R&B/Hip-Hop Songs (Billboard)	30
US R&B/Hip-Hop Airplay (Billboard)	31
US Hot Rap Songs (Billboard)	15
US Rhythmic Airplay (Billboard)	30
US Pop 100 (Billboard)	91
