= Hard to Be a God (1989 film) =

- Es ist nicht leicht ein Gott zu sein
- Directed by: Peter Fleischmann
- Written by: Jean-Claude Carrière; Dal Orlov; Peter Fleischmann
- Starring: Alexander Philippenko; Edward Żentara; Hugues Quester; Christine Kaufmann; Andrei Boltnev; Gayle Hunnicutt; Werner Herzog
- Cinematography: Jerzy Goscik; Pavel Lebeshev; Klaus Müller-Laue
- Edited by: Marie-Josée Audiard; Christian Virmond
- Music by: Hans-Jürgen Fritz
- Production companies: Hallelujah-Film GmbH; Dovzhenko Film Studios; V/O Sovinfilm; Garance Films; Mediactuel S.A. B.A. Filmproduktion GmbH; ZDF
- Distributed by: Jugendfilm-Verleih GmbH (Germany); Sirius le Distributeur (France)
- Release dates: 12 September 1989 (Venice Film Festival); 25 January 1990 (West Germany); May 1990 (Soviet Union); 7 August 1991
- Running time: 119 min.
- Countries: West Germany; Soviet Union; France; Switzerland
- Language: German
- Budget: 30 million Deutsche Mark

Hard to Be a God (German: Es ist nicht leicht ein Gott zu sein, Russian: Трудно быть богом, French: Un dieu rebelle) is a West German-Soviet-French-Swiss science fiction film directed by Peter Fleischmann and released in 1989, the movie based on the 1964 novel of the same name by Arkady and Boris Strugatsky.

Grant Stevens performed the title song, and the rest of the musical score was written and played by Hans-Jürgen Fritz, the ex-keyboardist for the German progressive rock band Triumvirat.

== Plot ==
In the third millennium, the people of Earth have found a "peaceful life", controlled their emotions and relied on reason.

On a distant planet, however, they find a medieval civilization of humans that they use to test whether people really no longer have any "barbaric" instincts.

For this purpose, the scout Anton and other explorers are released to live among these medieval people. A modern video camera is implanted in his eye, which transmits everything he sees to a spaceship orbiting the planet.

Living in the city of Arkanar under the identity of the nobleman Don Rumata, a fancy rich man in the city. Rumata finds it increasingly difficult to endure the "misery" of the townspeople, who are oppressed by the king and the ruthless advisor Don Reba. He tries to speed up their progress and initiate enlightenment to move the world forward, although he is strictly forbidden from interfering.

Rumata tries to convince his colleagues that an intervention must take place to help these people advance to the level of modern humans. However, Don Condor, an elder observer, feels that he has become too involved in native affairs and can't see the historical perspective objectively. They remind him of the dangers of meddling with the history of the planet. Not convinced, Rumata agrees to continue his work with these medieval people.

Rumata tries questioning multiple people for information to fulfil their mission and leave the planet as soon as possible. He encounters a love interest, a young girl commoner who can't stand the brutality and horrors of the fascist government of Arkanar and asks to stay in Rumata's house, and Rumata agrees.

Don Reba reveals that he has been watching Don Rumata for some time and recognizes Rumata as an impostor, knowing he had died a long time ago. However, Don Reba realizes that there is some supernatural power behind Rumata. Rumata's gold is of "high quality", and his sword-fighting style is unheard of; yet, he has never killed a single person while staying in Arkanar despite fighting in numerous duels in the city.

Rumata uses his new status and influence in the city to rescue Dr. Budah, as well as his new friend Baron Pampa from prison. Arkanar later succumbs to the Holy Order to keep the people under control, who prefers to keep people ignorant and obedient to rule the world as they like.

As the last of his friends and allies die and suffer in the turmoil of the civil war, Rumata acts with all haste to expedite the departure of Budah. Rumata asks him a theological question: what would you ask of a god if he were to descend from the heavens and fulfill any of your wishes? After a long discussion with Budah and Rumata, explaining the dire consequences of each of the wishes, Budah finally states that the only true gift a god could give the people is to leave them to their affairs. Rumata replies that he can't bear the sight of their suffering, then he knows that Rumata referred to himself in that last sentence rather than some hypothetical god.

Rumata later captures a helicopter disguised as a flying dragon to keep people far from himself, he then plans a revolution against the king, and is "worshiped" as a god for his abilities. He has a weapon that launches the energy beam; however, he falls in love with a native woman and has new friends who must fight to survive. In the bloody clashes of a civil war that follows in the city, the king and Don Reba die.

While Arkanar sinks into anarchy and terror, Don Rumata tries to help the people and his new friends. However, he is picked up from a spaceship at night because the test is over. It was Don Rumata whose reactions were tested by their civilization for the chief of the experiment of humans. Mr. Mita, considering that the violence could be contagious like a virus and provoke damage to their advanced civilization, make the "virus" return to its primitive past. The space station went on alert when the civil war began; however, they did not have a chance to stop it. They later arrive at night during the civil war and douse the entire city with a sleep-inducing gas. They discover that Don Rumata has already fought his way through the city. He also killed many people and "enjoyed" it. He was paralyzed by a light beam and rescued to end the experiment of Mr. Mita.

== Cast ==
- Edward Zentara as Rumata/Anton
- Alexander Philippenko as Reba
- Hugues Quester as Suren
- Christine Kaufmann as Okana
- Andrei Boltnev as Budach
- Werner Herzog as Mita
- Regimantas Adomaitis as Don Condor (Alexander Weiland)
- Elguja Burduli as Pampa
- Gayle Hunnicutt as Doreen
- Pierre Clémenti as King
- Mikhail Gluzsky as Gauk

== Production ==
Fleischmann began developing the film in 1983. In 1984, Hallelujah-Film and Sovinfilm agreed to make it the first co-production between West Germany and the Soviet Union. Agreements were also signed with Dovzhenko Film Studios in Kyiv and Sovexportfilm.

Financing came via the West German Federal Film Board, broadcaster ZDF and the Bavarian state government. Additional funding came from private investors as well as distributors Titanus in Italy and Jugendfilm.

Filming was due to start near Kyiv in 1986 but the Chernobyl disaster delayed the production. A large phantasmagoric set was later built in Yalta to resemble a town from the Middle Ages. Filming was also delayed after the director of Dovzhenko Film Studios and others were removed as part of the perestroika economic reforms. As well as in Yalta and the Dozhenko Film Studios, filming took place in Tajikistan.

The crew were a mix of Westerners and Soviets.
