= Dianna Kenny =

Australian psychologist and academic

Dianna Theadora Kenny
- Citizenship: Australian
- Education: B.A. (Hons), Psychology; A.T.C.L. (Piano); M.A., School Counselling; Ph.D., Psychology; Dip.Ed. PGDip Family Dispute Resolution
- Alma mater: University of Sydney; Trinity College London; Macquarie University; NSW Teachers’ College; NSW College of Law
- Scientific career
- Fields: Psychology, music psychology, criminology, public health, education
- Workplaces: University of Sydney

Dianna Theadora Kenny is an Australian psychologist, academic, researcher, and author. She is Professor Emerita of Psychology and Music at the University of Sydney where she taught, conducted research, and supervised higher degree research students for more than three decades.

Kenny has published extensively across psychology, music, criminology, public health, and education and is recognized internationally for her theory of music performance anxiety and for developing the Kenny Music Performance Anxiety Inventory (K-MPAI). In later years her work has focused on the psychodynamic, developmental, and social psychological perspectives on gender dysphoria in young people. Her work has been published in academic journals such as Frontiers in Psychology, Frontiers in Performance Science, Psychology of Music, Medical Problems of Performing Artists, and the Cochrane Database of Systematic Reviews. She has authored 12 books including The Psychology of Music Performance Anxiety.

She was one of the first clinicians in Australia to publicly express concerns about youth gender medicine.

== Education ==
Kenny completed a Bachelor of Arts with honors in psychology at the University of Sydney in 1974 and a diploma in education in 1975, then a graduate certificate in marriage and family therapy in 1980 from Relationships Australia, a Master of Arts in School Counselling in 1980 and in 1988 her PhD in psychology at Macquarie University. This was followed by a graduate diploma in family dispute resolution in 2016 from the College of Law. She also completed an associate diploma in piano (A.T.C.L.) from Trinity College London in 1977.

== Career ==
Kenny began her professional career as a primary school teacher with the NSW Department of Education. She then became a school counsellor and a specialist counsellor for emotionally and behaviorally disordered children. She joined the University of Sydney in 1988 as lecturer in psychology and attained conjoint professorships in psychology and music in 2006.

She has held administrative and leadership roles throughout her career, including director of the Work and Rehabilitation Research Unit, director of postgraduate studies at the National Voice Centre, and associate dean in both the Faculty of Health Sciences and the Sydney Conservatorium of Music. She founded the Australian Centre for Applied Research in Music Performance in 2002, where she led interdisciplinary studies on the physical and psychological demands of musical careers.

In 2019, she retired from full-time academic work and commenced full-time private practice in psychotherapy, marriage and family therapy, medico-legal consultancy, and family dispute resolution.

== Research ==
Kenny’s research spans several domains of psychology and public health. She developed the Kenny Music Performance Anxiety Inventory (K-MPAI) to assess the psychodynamic and behavioral dimensions of performance anxiety and led major projects on performance stress in adolescent musicians, opera chorus artists, and professional orchestral musicians.

In juvenile justice and forensic psychology, Kenny collaborated with the New South Wales Department of Juvenile Justice and Justice Health on large-scale studies of young offenders, illuminating issues in mental health, trauma, comorbidity, and rehabilitation needs. She has also undertaken research on the profiling of juvenile sex offenders and her analyses of the needs of troubled youth have been used in policy development and service planning.

Kenny also conducted research in occupational rehabilitation, examining workplace injury, return-to-work processes, patient satisfaction with the workers’ compensation process, and interprofessional collaboration in health and work settings. Her research with the WorkCover Authority of NSW contributed to a better understanding of psychological and systemic factors in rehabilitation outcomes.

Kenny’s research in the educational practice of grade repetition was the first in Australia and contributed to a reduction in grade repetition after findings showed few long-term benefits. She also demonstrated the low cost-benefit of out-of-school hours academic coaching for selective schools entry, scholarships, and higher school certificate results.

From the late 2010s onward, Kenny has written on gender dysphoria in children and adolescents, drawing on developmental, psychodynamic, family-systems, and social psychological perspectives. Her work includes books, articles, submissions to government inquiries, and public commentary.

== Public engagement ==
Kenny has written for The Conversation, where she has published articles discussing topics such as the mortality and life expectancy of popular musicians. Her research on the mortality of popular musicians has been reported in national and international media, including The Washington Post.

== Awards and honors ==
- 1991 – Award for Excellence in University Teaching, The University of Sydney
- 2003 – Award for Excellence in Higher Degree Research Supervision, The University of Sydney
- 2013 – Lifetime Membership, National Tertiary Education Union, Australia
- 2022 – Lifetime Achievement Award, Society for Education, Music and Psychology Research (SEMPRE)
- 2025 – Lifetime Achievement Award, Coalition for the Advancement of Scientific Care of Children

== Bibliography ==
=== Books (selected) ===
- Kenny, D.T., & Nelson, P.K. (2008). Young offenders on community orders: Health, welfare, and criminogenic needs. Sydney University Press. https://ses.library.usyd.edu.au/handle/2123/2267
- Kenny, D.T. (2011). The psychology of music performance anxiety. Oxford University Press. https://academic.oup.com/book/5046
- Kenny, D.T. (2013). Bringing up baby: The psychoanalytic infant comes of age. Karnac. https://www.taylorfrancis.com/books/mono/10.4324/9780429472619/bringing-baby-dianna-kenny
- Kenny, D.T. (2014). From Id to intersubjectivity: Talking about the talking cure with master clinicians. Karnac. https://www.amazon.com.au/Id-Intersubjectivity-Talking-Master-Clinicians/dp/1780491697
- Kenny, D.T. (2015). God, Freud, and religion: The origins of fear, faith, and fundamentalism. Routledge. https://www.routledge.com/God-Freud-and-Religion-The-origins-of-faith-fear-and-fundamentalism/Kenny/p/book/9781138791336
- Kenny, D. T. (2018). Children, sexuality, and child sexual abuse. Routledge. https://www.amazon.com.au/Children-Sexuality-Child-Sexual-Abuse/dp/1138089257
- Kenny, D.T. (2024). Gender ideology, social contagion, and the making of a transgender generation. Cambridge Scholars.https://www.cambridgescholars.com/product/978-1-0364-1478-8

=== Selected articles ===
- Schonstein, E., Kenny, D. T., Keating, J., & Koes, B. W. (2003). Work conditioning, work hardening and functional restoration for workers with back and neck pain. Cochrane Database of Systematic Reviews. https://europepmc.org/article/med/12535416
- Kenny, D. T. (2004). Constructions of chronic pain in doctor–patient relationships. Patient Education and Counseling. https://pubmed.ncbi.nlm.nih.gov/14998600/
- Ackermann, B. J., Kenny, D. T., O'Brien, I., & Driscoll, T. R. (2014). Sound Practice—improving occupational health and safety for professional orchestral musicians in Australia. Frontiers in Psychology. https://pmc.ncbi.nlm.nih.gov/articles/PMC4158789/
- Kenny, D. T. (2016). The adolescent brain: Implications for understanding young offenders. Judicial Officers Bulletin. https://search.informit.org/doi/abs/10.3316/informit.008923637458274
- Kenny, D. T. (2016). A brief history of psychoanalysis. Psychotherapy and Counselling Journal of Australia. https://pacja.org.au/article/71013-a-brief-history-of-psychoanalysis-from-freud-to-fantasy-to-folly
- Kenny, D. T. (2019). Faulty theory, failed therapy: Frances Tustin, infant and child csychoanalysis, and the treatment of autism spectrum disorders. SAGE Open. https://journals.sagepub.com/doi/10.1177/2158244019832686
- Ayad, S., D’Angelo, R., Kenny, D.T., Levine, S. B., Marchiano, L., & O’Malley, S. (2022). A Clinical Guide for Therapists Working with Gender-Questioning Youth.
- Kenny, D.T. (2023). The Kenny Music Performance Anxiety Inventory (K-MPAI): Scale construction, cross-cultural validation, theoretical underpinnings, and diagnostic and therapeutic utility. Frontiers in Psychology. https://www.frontiersin.org/journals/psychology/articles/10.3389/fpsyg.2023.1143359/full
- Kenny, D.T. (2025). Psychotherapeutic treatment of attachment trauma in musicians with severe music performance anxiety. Behavioral Sciences. https://pubmed.ncbi.nlm.nih.gov/41009300/
- International Handbook of Behavioral Health Assessment. 2023 living reference. Kenny Music Performance Anxiety Inventory (K-MPAI). https://link.springer.com/referencework/10.1007/978-3-030-89738-3
- Kenny, D.T. (2026). Music performance anxiety: evolutionary, developmental, and psychodynamic perspectives. Frontiers in Psychology. Vol. 17. https://doi.org/10.3389/fpsyg.2026.1787319
