= Henrique Luís Levy =

French musician and businessman (1829–1896)

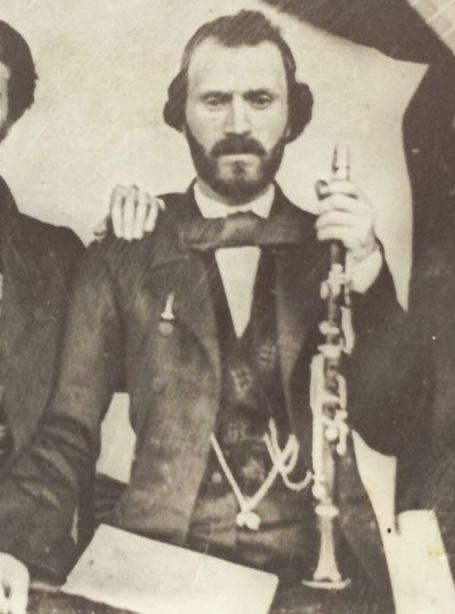

Henrique Luís Levy (1829–1896), alternatively spelled Henrique Louis Levy, was a French clarinetist, composer and businessman. He immigrated to Brazil in 1848 and founded Casa Levy, a leading music store in São Paulo.

== Biography ==
Levy was born on 10 December 1829 in Dehlingen, France. He fled to Switzerland in 1848 to escape anti-Semitic riots before immigrating to Brazil later the same year.

Levy originally settled in Campinas, where he became acquainted with the Brazilian composer Antônio Carlos Gomes. He later moved to São Paulo, where he founded the music store Casa Levy in 1860. According to the Harvard Biographical Dictionary of Music, Casa Levy "became the city's leading music store and a center of musical life".

Levy died on 14 August 1896 in São Paulo.

== Personal life ==
Levy was married to Anne Marie Teodoreth of Switzerland. The couple had three children, including Alexandre Levy (1864–1892) and Luís Levy (1861–1935), who were also musicians.
