= Psychology of Music =

- Discipline: Music psychology
- Language: English
- Edited by: Nikki Moran and Michelle Phillips

Publication details
- History: 1973-present
- Publisher: SAGE Publications on behalf of the Society for Education, Music and Psychology Research (United Kingdom)
- Frequency: Quarterly
- Impact factor: 1.553 (2012)

Standard abbreviations
- ISO 4: Psychol. Music

Indexing
- ISSN: 1741-3087 (print); 0305-7356 (web)
- LCCN: 74641791
- OCLC no.: 645313929

Links
- Journal homepage; Online access; Online archive

Psychology of Music is a peer-reviewed academic journal that publishes papers in the field of music psychology. The editor-in-chief role is held jointly by Nikki Moran (University of Edinburgh) and Michelle Phillips (University of Manchester). It was established in 1973 and is published by SAGE Publications on behalf of the Society for Education, Music and Psychology Research.

== Abstracting and indexing ==
The journal is abstracted and indexed in Scopus and the Social Sciences Citation Index. According to the Journal Citation Reports, its 2012 impact factor is 1.553.
