= Hans Bathelt =

German musician

Hans Bathelt is a German drummer, percussionist and lyricist who played with the German progressive rock band Triumvirat between 1970 and 1976. He left because of musical differences between him and the keyboardist Hans Jürgen Fritz, the record company wanted some more commercial music, Fritz gave them what they wanted so the drummer left

== Discography ==
=== Studio albums ===
- Mediterranean Tales (1972)
- Illusions on a Double Dimple (1974) U.S. #55
- Spartacus (1975) U.S. #27
- Old Loves Die Hard (1976) U.S. #85

== Collaboration ==
- 1977 : You won't see me from Helmut Köllen. - Text for the song The Story Of Life, album was played & produced by keyboardist Hans-Jürgen Fritz.
- 1984 : Gladbacher Freunde from Fly Dirt. - His collaboration with keyboardist Hans-Jürgen Fritz is for the text and music of the title song Gladbacher Freunde, although they did not play on the album. The album was engineered and mixed by Fritz.
