= Étude (instrumental) =

Single by musician Mike Oldfield

Single by Mike Oldfield

from the album The Killing Fields
- B-side: "Evacuation"
- Released: 19 November 1984; 3 December 1990 (re-issue)
- Genre: Folktronica
- Length: 3:07
- Label: Virgin Records
- Songwriter(s): Francisco Tárrega
- Producer(s): Mike Oldfield

Mike Oldfield singles chronology
"Tricks of the Light" (1984)	"Étude" (1984)	"Pictures in the Dark" (1985)

"Étude"

Single by Mike Oldfield
- B-side: "Gakkaen" (The Ono Gagaku Kai Society)
- Released: 1990
- Genre: Folktronica
- Label: Virgin Records
- Songwriter(s): Francisco Tárrega
- Producer(s): Mike Oldfield

Mike Oldfield singles chronology
"(One Glance is) Holy" (1989)	"Étude" (1990)	"Heaven's Open" (1991)

"Étude" is a single by musician Mike Oldfield, released in 1984, but recorded in 1982. It is from the album The Killing Fields, the soundtrack album for the film of the same name. It was reissued in December 1990, when it was used in a commercial for Nurofen. The 1990 release also featured a track called "Gakkaen" by The Ono Gagaku Kai Society.

"Étude" is taken from the Francisco Tárrega piece "Recuerdos de la Alhambra".

== Music video ==
The music video for "Étude" which appears on the Elements – The Best of Mike Oldfield video shows a boy watching parts of The Killing Fields on a television from a reel-to-reel tape machine and looking through photographs. The boy also plays with a Fairlight CMI, which the soundtrack album was composed on.

== Track listing ==
=== 7-inch vinyl ===
1. "Étude" (edit) – 3:07
2. "Evacuation" (edit) – 4:11

=== 12-inch vinyl ===
1. "Étude" – 4:38
2. "Evacuation" – 5:13

=== 1990 release ===
1. "Étude" – Mike Oldfield
2. "Gakkaen" – The Ono Gagaku Kai Society
