= Janitor Joe =

American rock band

Background information
- Origin: Minneapolis, Minnesota, United States
- Genres: Grunge, Alternative rock, post-hardcore, noise rock
- Years active: 1992–1994, 2010 (one-off reunion show)
- Labels: OXO, Amphetamine Reptile
- Members: Joachim Breuer; Wayne Davis; Matt Entsminger
- Past members: Kristen Pfaff

Janitor Joe was an American noise rock band formed in Minneapolis in 1992. The band's founding members were vocalist/guitarist Joachim Breuer, bassist/vocalist Kristen Pfaff, and drummer Matt Entsminger. Pfaff was replaced by Wayne Davis following her departure in 1993 to join Hole.

Janitor Joe released two studio albums and four singles on OXO and Amphetamine Reptile before disbanding after Pfaff's death in June 1994.

== Career ==
The band's first single, "Hmong", was released on the nascent OXO records imprint in 1992, and popular local label Amphetamine Reptile picked up the band later that year, releasing the "Bullethead" single on picture disc, and following up in 1993 with the "Boyfriend" 7-inch and the debut album Big Metal Birds. One Janitor Joe track, "Under the Knife", can also be found on an OXO records 4-track EP, released in 1993.

Janitor Joe became a staple of the Minneapolis sound, characterized by vicious, riff-driven, thickly layered blasts of noise, influenced by the Pacific Northwest's early grunge sound and by the sharper, faster DC Post-hardcore scene, as well as the stop-start distortion of the Butthole Surfers, Shellac and others on the Touch and Go label. Pfaff and Breuer both contributed songs to Big Metal Birds: "Both operate within easy reach of the line separating punishment and reward: Pfaff's contributions (the surly "Boys in Blue") tend to be slightly more spacious, while Breuer's ("One Eye," for instance) stipulate that drummer Matt Entsminger maintain perpetual motion", wrote David Sprague of TrouserPress magazine.

The growing Minneapolis scene was beginning to attract music press attention in 1993. Amphetamine Reptile released a tour single, Stinker, and Janitor Joe began to tour nationally. While playing in California, Pfaff was scouted by Eric Erlandson and Courtney Love of Hole, then looking for a bassist. Though she initially declined to join, Pfaff later reconsidered and moved to Seattle to work on Live Through This, Hole's second album.

Janitor Joe recruited Wayne Davis to replace Pfaff, and continued to write and tour. Amphetamine Reptile released Lucky, the band's second album, in 1994. Pfaff was tiring of Seattle by this time, and took a sabbatical from Hole to rejoin Janitor Joe for a spring tour. Her plans to return to Minneapolis and rejoin Janitor Joe permanently were curtailed when, in June 1994, she was found dead of a heroin overdose in her bathtub. She had planned to drive to Minneapolis the next day; her U-Haul stood, packed, in her garage.

Janitor Joe split in 1994, in the wake of Pfaff's death. Breuer and Entsminger went on to form Gnomes of Zurich with Scott Hull, and the band released an album, again on Amphetamine Reptile, entitled 33rd Degree Burns, as well as singles on Reptilian Records and Sister Records. On August 29, 2010, Breuer, Paul Erickson of Hammerhead & Vaz, and Enstminger reformed the group for a one-off performance at Amphetamine Reptile Records' 25th anniversary bash in Minneapolis.

== Discography ==
=== Singles ===
1. Hmong 7" (OXO Records, 1992, OXO 002)
  1. Hmong today, Hung tomorrow
  2. Prone
  3. Big Nose
2. Bullethead 7" (Amphetamine Reptile, 1992, scale 51) picture disc, research and development series
  1. Bullethead
  2. KCL
3. Stinker 7" (Amphetamine Reptile, 1993, scale 62) tour only
  1. Stinker
  2. Pest
4. Boyfriends 7"/CDS (Amphetamine Reptile, 1993, scale 90-2 /ARR 37/245)
  1. Boyfriend
  2. Yellow Car

=== Albums ===
- Big Metal Birds (1993)
- Lucky (1994)

=== Compilations ===
Amphetamine Records Sampler 1993 CD (Amphetamine Reptile Europe, 1993, ARRCD 42/279)

- Track: Boys In Blue

1993 Sampler CD (Amphetamine Reptile USA, 1993, amrep 099)

- Track: Boys In Blue

AmRep Motors 1995 Models, sampler CD (Amphetamine Reptile Europe, 1995, ARRCD 62/005)

- Track: Fragile X

Oxo 5 7" (OXO Records, year ?, OXO 005)

- Track: Under The Knife

== See also ==
- Kristen Pfaff § Janitor Joe
