= Barry Palmer (British singer) =

English singer

Barry Palmer (born abt 1952) is an English singer. He performed with the German band Triumvirat in the late 1970s. He also appeared on Mike Oldfield's gold 1984 Discovery album, sharing vocals with Maggie Reilly. Palmer released two solo albums, Without an Aim in 1985 and Night Thoughts in 2013. In 1974, he also sang vocals on "The Bump" by the group Kenny, which reached No. 3 in the UK Singles Chart. In 1987, Palmer also formed the record company, Pyramid Records, to represent acts in central England.

== Biography and career ==
Palmer was born about 1952 in Worcestershire, England. He grew up in the Ronkswood neighbourhood of Worchester and attended St Paul’s School in the Blockhouse neighbourhood. After he left school, he became an apprentice painter/decorator.

=== Early solo career and Triumvirat ===
Palmer began his singing career in the mid 1970s when he joined the five-piece Scarborough-based band Brave New World as their lead singer. After Brave New World disbanded in 1972-73, Palmer pursued a solo singing career. In 1974, he also sang vocals on "The Bump" by the London group Kenny. "The Bump" reached No. 3 in the UK Singles Chart.

Palmer answered an ad in magazine Melody Maker for the German progressive rock band Triumvirat who looking for a new lead vocalist, as their lead singer, Helmut Köllen left to pursue a solo career. Palmer sent Jürgen a demo tape of his single "Maybe I'm Amazed" and secured the gig. Triumvirat replaced Köllen with Palmer to record their next album Old Loves Die Hard, released in 1976.

=== Solo work and collab with Mike Oldfield ===
After he left the Triumvirat, Palmer stayed in Germany, recording and touring with other bands.

In 1983, the musician Mike Oldfield heard one of Triumvirat's albums and invited Palmer to join his Crises album tour but Palmer refused as he was working on his solo album. In 1984, Oldfield contacted him and asked him to sing on his new track, "Crime of Passion". Alternating with Maggie Reilly, Palmer sang every other song on Oldfield's Discovery album, appearing on "Pictures in the Dark", "Tricks of the Light", "Saved by a Bell" and "Discovery". Discovery was a double gold album.

=== Later career ===
After his work with Oldfield, Palmer teamed up in a duo called Cover Up with John Payne to release the songs "Love The One You're With" and "Feel the Fire", written by the pair and Stephen Stills. Palmer also released his solo album Without an Aim in 1985.

In 1987, Palmer formed his own record company, Pyramid Records, with a deal to release the distribute through EMI. That year, he released an EP entitled "Shimmering Gold" and his own version of "House of the Rising Sun" as well as "God Bless the Children". Critics were not keen on the "House of the Rising Sun" saying remakes of the original were overdone.

"God Bless the Children" was written for the Miss World contest. It was selected to be sung by all the Miss World 1987 contestants when they appeared at the Royal Albert Hall in London. It was released by Palmer's Pyramid Records in 1988, with the video for the song featuring the choir from the Gladstone Road Junior School in Scarborough. Proceeds from the song were to be donated to the Save the Children Fund.

In 1987, Palmer also produced the UK hit "Lies" for Amanda Scott, younger sister of Bonnie Tyler.

Between 1990 and 1994, Palmer was lead singer of a blues rock band called Jonesville. From 1995 to 2000, Palmer was lead vocalist with the London bands, The Wedge and Nightshift. In 2001, he released a single entitled "Dear John". In 2012, he released the single, "Innocent", followed later that year by the studio album Night Thoughts.

== Discography ==
=== Albums ===
With Triumvirat:

- Old Loves Die Hard (1976)
- Pompeii (1977)
- À La Carte (1978)

With Satin Whale:

- Don’t Stop the Show (1980/81)

With Mike Oldfield:

- Discovery (1984/85)

As Barry Palmer:

- Without An Aim (1985)
- Night Thoughts (2012)

Various Artists Featuring Barry Palmer, Mickey Simmonds And Tom Newman

- A Tribute To Mike Oldfield (2000)

=== Singles/EPs ===
As Barry Joe Palmer:

- "Always" (1973)
- "Getaway" (1973)

Barry Palmer as Kenny:

- "The Bump" (1974)

Barry Palmer as DC Palmer:

- "Maybe I’m Amazed" (1975)

With Triumvirat:

- "The Hymn" (1977)
- "Take a Break Today" / "The Capitol of Power" (2000)

With Gaensehaut:

- "Mr America" (1980)

With Satin Whale:

- "Don’t Stop the Show" / "Girl" (1980/81)

With Mike Oldfield (1984 / 1985):

- "Crime of Passion"
- "Pictures in the Dark"
- "Tricks of the Light"
- "Saved By A Bell"
- "Discovery"
- "Poison Arrows"
- "When the Nights on Fire" (Demo)
- "Man in the Rain" (Demo)

Barry Palmer as Cover Up:

- "Love the One You're With" / "Feel the Fire" (1985)

As Barry Palmer:

- "She's Leaving Home" (1983)
- "When One Door Closes" (1984)
- "When One Door Closes" (1985)
- "Doo Wah Diddy Diddy" / "Spirit of America" (1986)
- "Shimmering Gold" / "Unknown Singer" (1987)
- "House of the Rising Sun" (1987)
- "God Bless The Children" / "Somebody Sing My Song" (1987)
- "Dear John" / "Ghost of a Love" (2000/01)
- "Innocent" (2012)

Barry Palmer as Producer / Record Label: (for Amanda Scott)

- "Lies" / "I Need Experience" (1988)
