= Alexandre Levy =

Brazilian composer, pianist and conductor

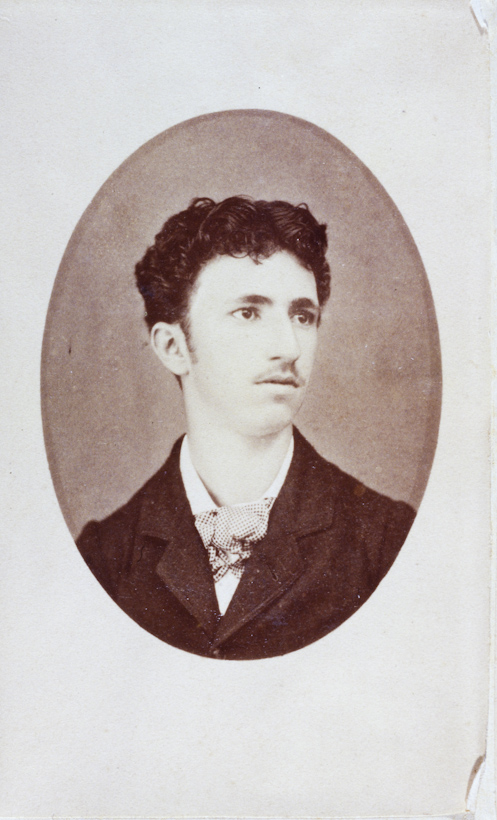
- Levy in 1881
- Born: 10 November 1864; São Paulo, Empire of Brazil
- Died: 17 January 1892 (aged 27); São Paulo, Brazil
- Years active: 1880–1892

Alexandre Levy (10 November 1864 – 17 January 1892) was a Brazilian composer, pianist and conductor. Born in São Paulo, he pioneered a fusion of classical composition with Brazil's popular folk music and rhythms. His hometown grants a prestigious award in his name.

His Jewish family came from France and was musically active. His father, Henrique Luís Levy, was a musician who founded Casa Levy, a leading music store in São Paulo.

Darius Milhaud, in his ballet Le Bœuf sur le toit, borrowed a theme from Levy's Tango Brasileiro.

== Selected list of works ==
=== Orchestra ===
- Andante para cordas in E♭ major (1887) for String Orchestra (1887)
- Werther, Symphonic Poem in E♭ major after Goethe (1888)
- Marcha com coros, Orchestral Cantata (1888)
- Hymne à 14 Juillet (1889)
- Symphony in E minor (1889)
1. Largo – Allegro molto
2. Andante
3. Scherzo. Allegro vivo
4. Allegro molto vivo
- Comala, Symphonic Poem (1890)
- Suite Brésilienne (1890)
1. Prélude
2. Dansa rustica: Canção Triste (lost)
3. A beira do regato: Idyllio Sentimental
4. Samba
- Symphonic Poem (unnamed; n.d.)
- Oedipe, Orchestral Cantata (n.d.)

=== Chamber Music ===
- Fantasia brillante sull'opera 'Il Guarany' for two pianos, Op. 2 (1880)
- Piano Trio No. 1 in B♭ major, Op. 10 (1882)
1. Allegro
2. Andante
3. Scherzo – Fugato
4. Finale
- Les jeux des Sylphides for four-hand piano (1884)
- Scherzo valse, Op. 9 (1885)
- String Quartet in A minor (1885)
1. Allegro comodo
2. Scherzo
3. Adagio molto
4. Finale
- Andante for String Quartet in E♭ minor (1887; also adapted for string orchestra)
- Rêverie for string quartet in G major, Op. 19 (1889)
- Piano Trio No. 2 in D minor (1889)
1. (Lost)
2. (Lost)
3. Scherzo
4. Finale
- En mer, Musical poem for four-hand piano (n.d.)
  - Depart. Mer Calme
  - Le Ciel s'assombrit. Tempête
  - Clair de Lune. Idylle Fugitive
- Romance' (n.d.)
- Fantasie brillante for four-hand piano, Op. 5 (n.d.)
- Scène à la mer for cello and piano (n.d.)

=== Piano solo ===
- Fantasia para dois pianos a partir de temas da ópera O Guarany (1880)
- Impromptu-Caprice, op. 1 (1881)
- Fosca, fantasia brilhante, op. 3 (1882)
- 3 Improvisations, op. 4 (1882)
1. Romance sans paroles (1882)
2. A la Hongroise (1882)
3. Pensée fugitive (1882)
- Valsa-Capricho, op. 5 (1882)
- Mazurca n. 1, op. 6 no 1 (1882)
- Mazurca n. 2, op. 6 no 2 (1882)
- Recuerdos - Polca de Salão (1882)
- Causerie (1883)
- Cavalcante (1883)
- Collin Maillard (1883)
- Étude (1883)
- Je t'en prie (1883)
- Petite marche (1883)
- Plaintive (1885)
- Scherzo-valse, op. 9 (1885)
- Improviso n. 2 (1887)
- Trois Morceaux, op. 13 (1887)
1. Coeur blessé (1887)
2. Amour passé (1887)
3. Doute (1887)
- Allegro Appassionato, op. 14 (1887)
- Variations sur un thème populaire brésilien (Vem Cá, Bitu) (1887)
- Tango Brasileiro (1890)
- Samba (Suite Brésilienne, IV.) (1890)
- Schumanniana, op. 16 (1891)
1. Allegretto, ma un poco agitato
2. Allegro moderato
3. Lento
4. Allegretto giocoso
5. Moderato assai
6. Allegro
7. Moderato
8. Allegro molto – Presto
- Papillonnage (n.d.)
