= Edward Żentara =

Polish actor

- Born: 18 March 1956; Sianów, Poland
- Died: 25 May 2011 (aged 55); Tarnów, Poland
- Occupation: Actor
- Years active: 1978-2010

Edward Żentara (18 March 1956 – 25 May 2011) was a Polish actor. He appeared in more than 50 films and television shows between 1978 and 2010. His son Mikołaj is the founder of Polish black metal band Mgła.

== Selected filmography ==
- Austeria (1982) - Hasid
- Byl jazz (1983)
- Karate po polsku (1983) - Piotr
- Wedle wyroków twoich... (1984)
- Marynia (1984)
- Coronel Redl (1985) - Hauptmann Salapska
- Sam posród swoich (1985) - Merchant Polsner
- C.K. dezerterzy (1986) - Lieutenant
- Zygfryd (1986) - Stanislaw
- Axiliad (1986) - Janek Pradera
- Aniol w szafie (1987) - Film Director
- Luk Erosa (1987) - Zatorski
- Opowiesc Harleya (1988) - Marek
- Bez grzechu (1988) - Jan Jezierski, Marta's Brother
- Hard to Be a God (1989) - Rumata / Anton
- Triumph of the Spirit (1989) - Janush
- ¡Ay Carmela! (1990) - Soldado polaco
- Life for Life: Maximilian Kolbe (1991) - Maximilian Kolbe
- Przekleta Ameryka (1993) - Zbyszek Butryn
- Piekna nieznajoma (1993) - The Spy Chief
- Enak (1993) - Charles Enak
- Pestka (1995) - Priest in Borys' Workshop
- Pokuszenie (1995) - Parson
- Germans (1996) - Tourterelle
- Watroba i Ziemniaki (1998) - Kain
- Zloto dezerterów (1998) - Tank soldier
- The Hexer (2002, TV Mini-Series) - King Foltest
- Show (2003) - Politician
- Nie ma takiego numeru (2007)
- Czarny (2008) - Priest Jan
- Trick (2010) - Vice prime minister
