= Tricks of the Light =

Single by Mike Oldfield

from the album Discovery
- B-side: "Afghan"
- Released: 10 September 1984
- Recorded: "In the Swiss Alps at 2000 metres within sight of Lake Geneva on sunny days"
- Genre: Pop rock
- Length: 3:52
- Label: Virgin
- Songwriter: Mike Oldfield
- Producers: Mike Oldfield; Simon Phillips

Mike Oldfield singles chronology
"To France" (1984)	"Tricks of the Light" (1984)	"Etude" (1984)

"Tricks of the Light" is a single by musician Mike Oldfield released in 1984 and is from the Virgin Records album Discovery. Maggie Reilly and Barry Palmer perform vocals for this song.

The single's B-side, "Afghan" (working title "Celtic"), is a non-album track, and was recorded at the same time as the Discovery album. The single also features an instrumental version of "Tricks of the Light".

== Music video ==
The music video for "Tricks of the Light" is a mock-live performance of the song and focuses on a girl in the audience. Interspersed are non-concert scenes of the same girl with and without sunglasses. Oldfield plays a Fender Stratocaster in the video and a Fairlight CMI appears on stage. The clip is available on the Elements – The Best of Mike Oldfield video.

== Track listing ==
1. "Tricks of the Light" – 3:52
2. "Afghan" – 2:45
3. "Tricks of the Light" (Instrumental) – 3:56

== Charts ==
Chart (1984)	Peak position
UK Singles (Official Charts Company)	91
West Germany (GfK)	46
