= The Killing Fields (soundtrack) =

Soundtrack album by Mike Oldfield
- Released: 26 November 1984
- Recorded: England, Germany & Switzerland 1984
- Genre: Neoclassical
- Length: 38:09
- Label: Virgin
- Producer: Mike Oldfield

Mike Oldfield chronology
Discovery (1984)	The Killing Fields (1984)	Islands (1987)

Singles from The Killing Fields
- 1. "Étude" Released: 19 November 1984

Professional ratings
Review scores
Source	Rating
Allmusic	4/5 stars

The Killing Fields is the tenth studio album by Mike Oldfield, released on 26 November 1984 by Virgin Records in the UK. It was the soundtrack album for the British drama film of the same name based on the experiences of two journalists in the Khmer Rouge regime in Cambodia. It is the only full-length film score written by Oldfield.

The music was orchestrated by David Bedford. The Killing Fields was re-released in a remastered edition format on 29 January 2016, as per all previous albums which were originally released on the Virgin label.

== History ==
Though Oldfield's music had been used in films before (see The Exorcist and The Space Movie), this was the first time he had written specifically for film, and so far the only time. Oldfield composed the album on a Fairlight CMI.

Like many soundtracks, the album is not a comprehensive record of all the Oldfield music used in the film. Most notably, the music accompanying the darkroom sequence does not feature on the album. The single from the album, "Étude", is taken from the Francisco Tarrega piece "Recuerdos de la Alhambra".

Oldfield's work on the score was partially instigated by Virgin boss Richard Branson when he took Oldfield to see David Puttnam, a producer on the film, which then secured him the role.

Oldfield spent six months working on the score for The Killing Fields before going on tour, but when Oldfield returned, the producers of the film asked for more music to be written, prompting Oldfield to ask for the use of an orchestra and a choir; three months later the score was finished. It was released just a few months after Oldfield's previous album, Discovery.

In Canada, the album reached #90 in the Top Album charts.

== Track listing ==
All tracks written by Mike Oldfield, except where stated.

=== Side One ===
1. "Pran's Theme" – 0:44
2. "Requiem for a City" – 2:11
3. "Evacuation" – 5:14
4. "Pran's Theme 2" – 1:41
5. "Capture" – 2:24
6. "Execution" – 4:47
7. "Bad News" – 1:14
8. "Pran's Departure" – 2:08

=== Side Two ===
1. "Worksite" – 1:16
2. "The Year Zero" – 0:28 (David Bedford)
3. "Blood Sucking" – 1:19
4. "The Year Zero 2" – 0:37
5. "Pran's Escape" / "The Killing Fields" – 3:17
6. "The Trek" – 2:02
7. "The Boy's Burial" / "Pran Sees the Red Cross" – 2:24
8. "Good News" – 1:46
9. "Étude" – 4:37 (Francisco Tárrega, arranged by Mike Oldfield)

=== 2016 New Remaster ===
1. "Pran's Theme"
2. "Requiem for a City"
3. "Evacuation"
4. "Pran's Theme 2"
5. "Capture"
6. "Execution"
7. "Bad News"
8. "Pran's Departure"
9. "Worksite"
10. "The Year Zero"
11. "Blood Sucking"
12. "The Year Zero 2"
13. "Pran's Escape" / "The Killing Fields"
14. "The Trek"
15. "The Boy's Burial" / "Pran Sees the Red Cross"
16. "Good News"
17. "Étude"
18. "Evacuation (Single edit)" (Bonus track)
19. "Étude (Single edit)" (Bonus track)

== Personnel ==
- Mike Oldfield – guitars (Gibson Les Paul Junior and SG Junior), synthesizers (including Sequential Circuits Prophet 5, Oberheim OB-Xa, DMX, and Roland VP-330), Fairlight CMI, producer, engineer
- Preston Heyman – oriental percussion
- Morris Pert – percussion
- Eberhard Schoener – conductor
- Bavarian State Orchestra
- Tölzer Boys Choir

== Certifications ==
Region	Certification	Certified units/sales
United Kingdom (BPI)	Silver	60,000^{^}
^{^} Shipments figures based on certification alone.
