= Jürgen Fritz =

German musician

Jürgen Fritz (born March 12, 1953, in Köln) is a German musician. He was the keyboard player in progressive rock band Triumvirat. He also composed the film score to the 1989 science fiction film Hard to Be a God and also published a solo album in 1990, Millennium. In 1986-1988 he collaborated with German disco group Bad Boys Blue as arranger and keyboardist.

== Discography ==
=== Albums ===
With Triumvirat:

– Singles;

- "Be Home for Tea" / "Broken Mirror" (1972) Harvest – 1C 006-29 976
- "Ride in the Night" / "Sing Me a Song" (1973) Harvest – 1C 006-30 407, EMI Electrola – 1C 006-30 407 U
- "Dancer's Delight" / "Timothy" (1973) Harvest – 1C 006-30 484, EMI Electrola – 1C 006-30 484
- "Dimplicity" / "Million Dollars" (1974) Harvest, EMI Electrola - 1C 006-30 576
- "Take a Break Today" / "The Capitol of Power" (1976) Harvest, EMI Electrola 1C 006-31 609
- "Waterfall" / "Jo Ann Walker" (1978) Harvest, EMI Electrola 1C 006-45 189
- "The Hymn" / "Dance on the Vulcano" (1978) Harvest – 1C 006-32 548, EMI Electrola – 1C 006-32 548
- "Waterfall" / "(Oh, I'm) Late Again" (1978) Capitol Records – SPRO-9080, Capitol Records – SPRO-9081
- "Party Life" / "Games" (1980) Harvest, EMI Electrola 1C 006-45 918

– Albums :

- 1973 – Mediterranean Tales
- 1974 – Illusions on a Double Dimple
- 1975 – Spartacus
- 1976 – Old Loves Die Hard
- 1977 – Pompeii
- 1978 – A la Carte
- 1980 – Russian Roulette

– Best of:

- 1995 – The Gold Collection – Only distributed in Germany. Included on this album is a cover from The Beach Boys' song "Darlin'"
- 1995 – The Best of Triumvirat – Brazil exclusive distribution.
- ???? – The Best of the Gold Collection – Novo
- 2000 – Veni, Vidi, Vici
- 2012 – Essential EMI – 50999 6 44353 2 9

– Bootlegs:

- Illusions on a Double Dimple Live – Palace Theatre, Providence, USA October 1974
- Illusions on a Double Dimple Live – St. Bernard Cultural Center, Chalmette, LA, USA November 1974
- Live from Ultrasonic – Recorded live at Studio Ultrasonic, Hempstead, New York, October 1974
- Live Tour 1974–75 – American tour of 1974–75

– Solo:

- 1989 – Es ist nicht leicht, ein Gott zu sein (soundtrack album)
- 1990 – Millennium - Dreams of Amadeus along with W. Hildenbeutel

– With Helmut Kollen:

- 1977 – You Won't See Me - Keyboards & production.

- With Eric Burdon:

- 1977 - Survivor - Keyboards.

- With Bad Boys Blue

- 1986 - Heartbeat, keyboards, arrangement
- 1987 - Love Is No Crime, keyboards, arrangement
- 1988 - My Blue World, arrangement
