= 27 Club =

Notional club occupied by those who died at age 27

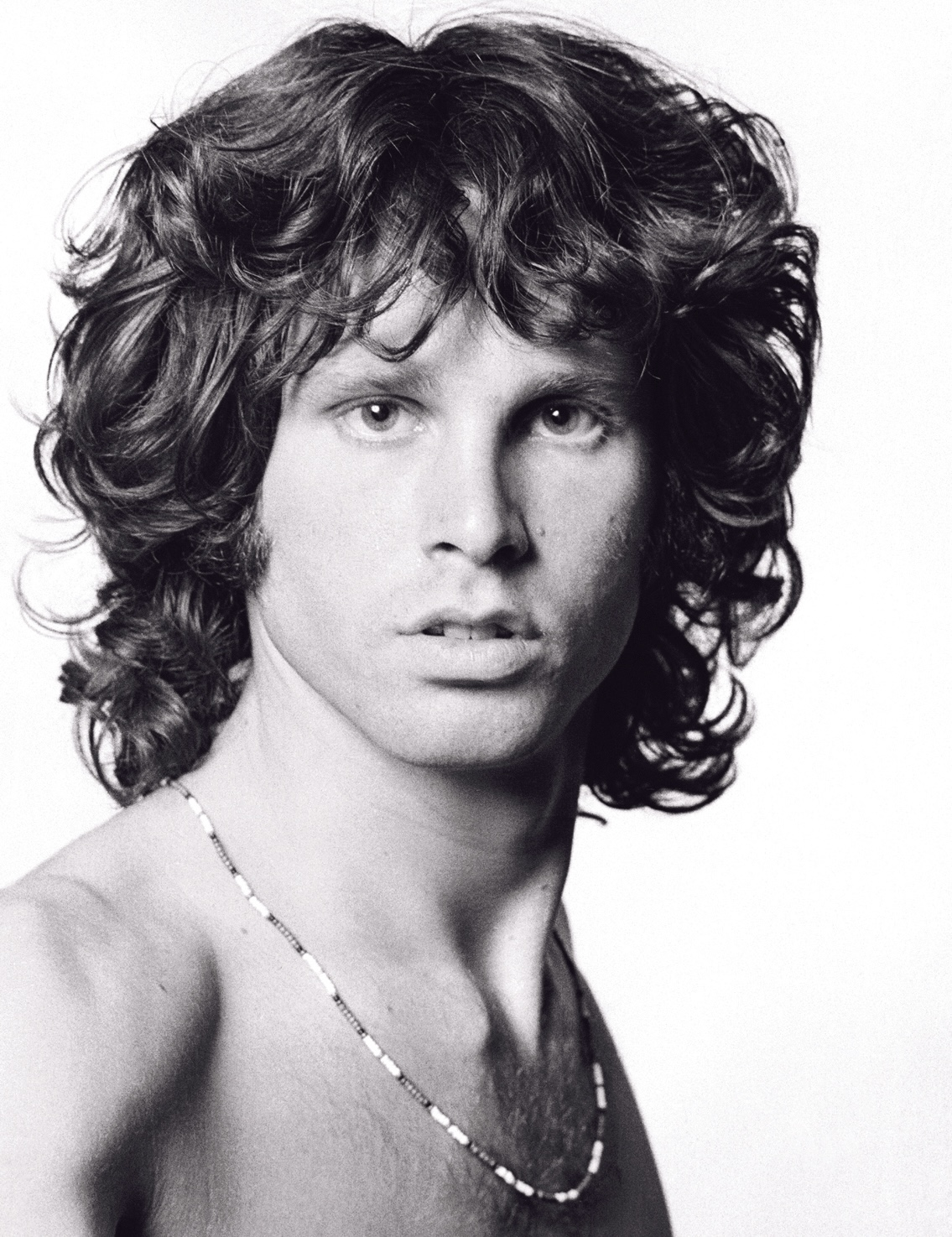
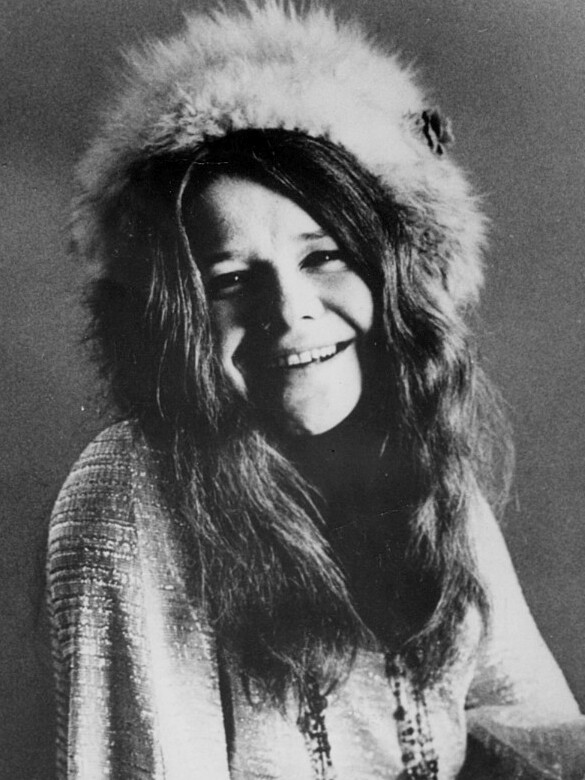
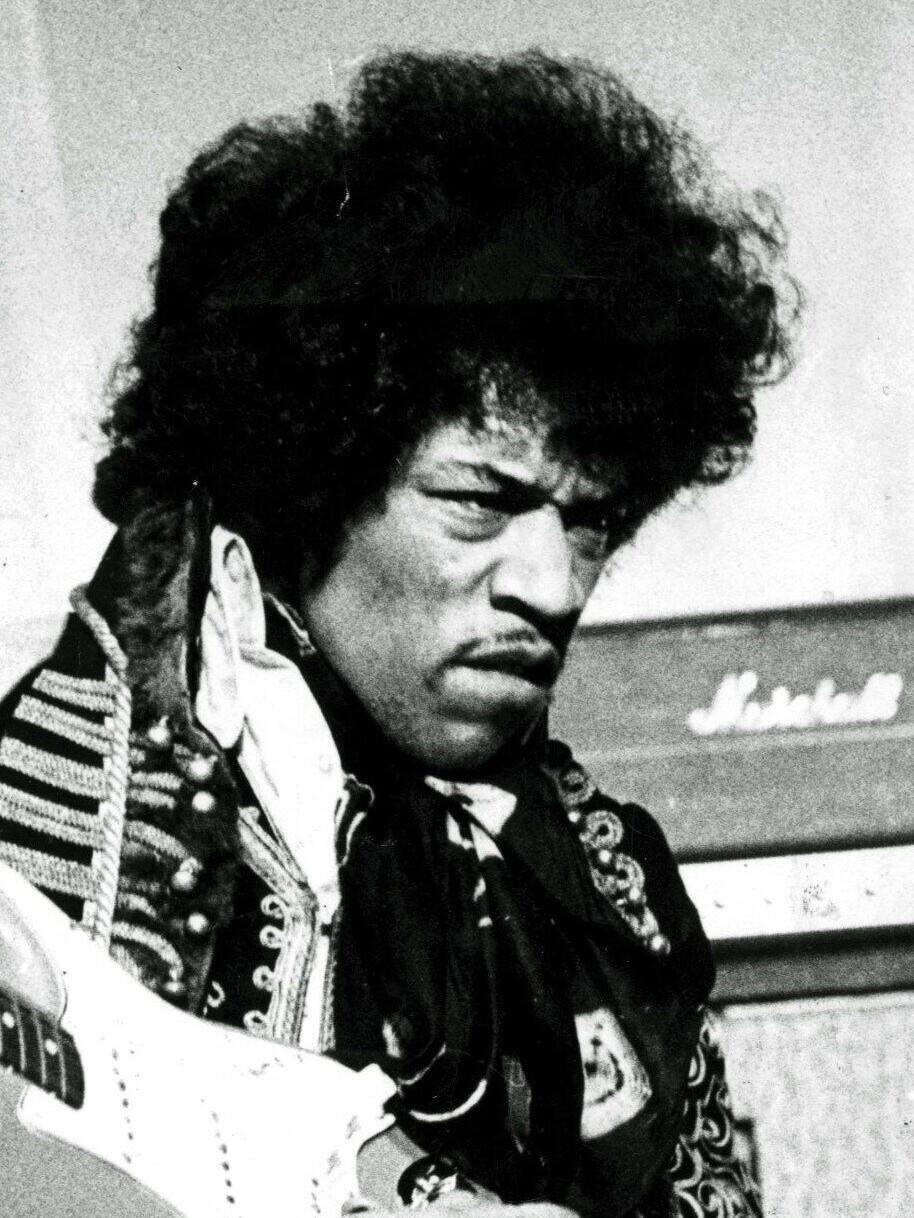
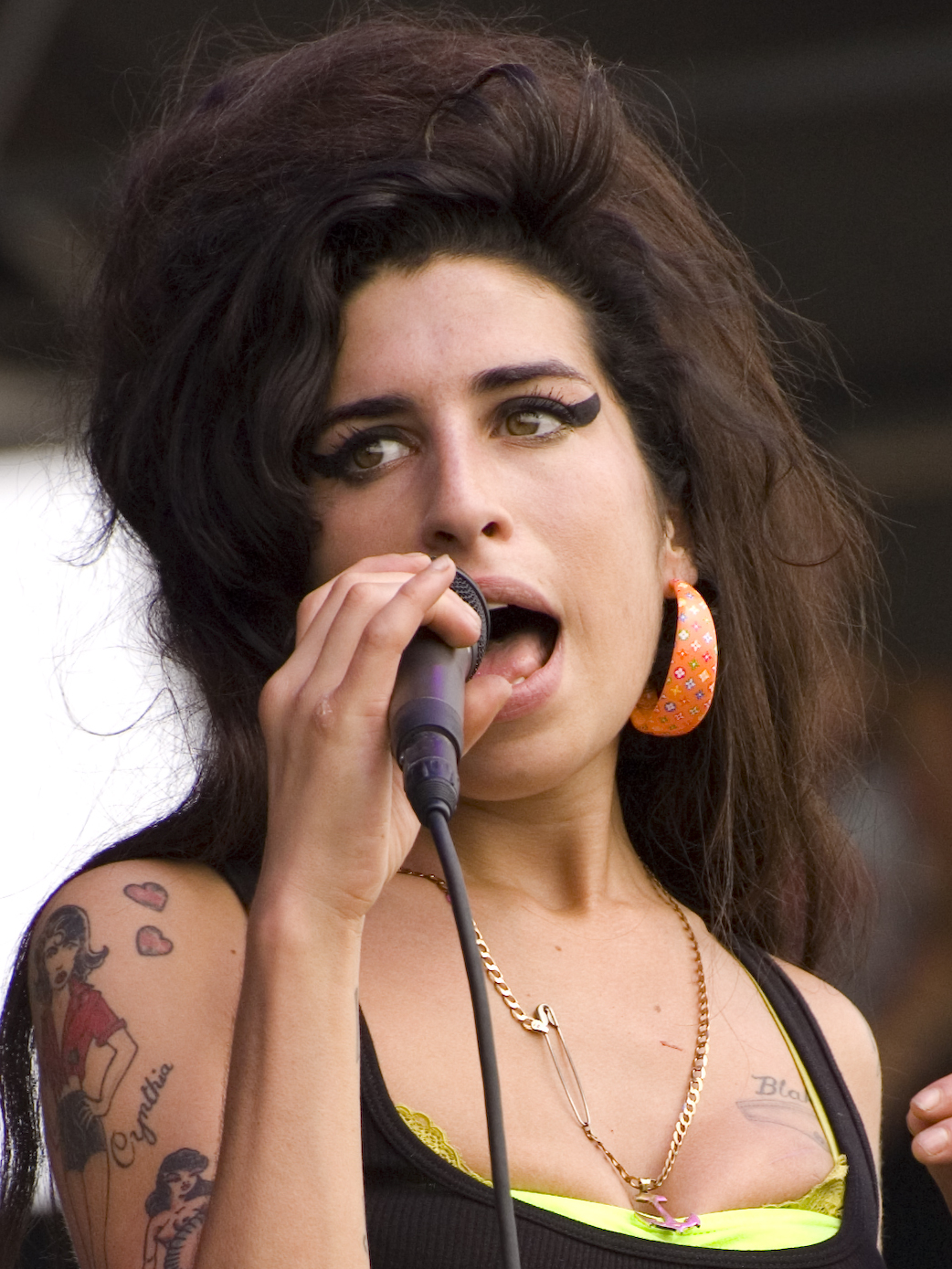
Musicians who died at the age of 27 include Jim Morrison, Janis Joplin, Jimi Hendrix and Amy Winehouse

The 27 Club is an informal list consisting mostly of popular musicians who died at age 27. As a pop-cultural phenomenon, it is closely linked to the urban myth that musicians' deaths are unusually common at 27. Although this claim has been refuted by scientific research, it remains a common cultural conception that the phenomenon exists, with many celebrities who die at 27 noted for their high-risk lifestyles.

The original basis for the notion was a cluster of prominent musicians' deaths at the age of 27 between 1969 and 1971, including Brian Jones, Jimi Hendrix, Janis Joplin, and Jim Morrison; but only after the death of Kurt Cobain in 1994 was the notion of a "club" established, and the death of Amy Winehouse in 2011 enhanced its prominence. Different write-ups include a number of other musicians and sometimes other celebrities.

== Cultural perception ==
Beginning with the deaths of several 27-year-old popular musicians between 1969 and 1971 (namely Jones, Hendrix, Joplin and Morrison), dying at the age of 27 came to be, and remains, a perennial subject of popular culture, celebrity journalism, and entertainment industry lore. This perceived phenomenon, which came to be known as the "27 Club", attributes special significance to popular musicians, artists, actors, and other celebrities who died at age 27, often as a result of drug and alcohol abuse or violent means such as homicide, suicide, or transportation-related accidents.

The cultural interpretation of events gave rise to an urban myth that celebrity deaths are more common at 27, a claim that has been refuted by statistical research as discussed in the scientific studies section below. Research also indicates that the myth has become self-perpetuating, by boosting the visibility and cultural prominence of those who die at 27.

== History ==
Brian Jones, Jimi Hendrix, Janis Joplin, and Jim Morrison all died at the age of 27 between 1969 and 1971. At the time, the coincidence gave rise to some comment, but, according to Charles R. Cross, a biographer of Hendrix and Kurt Cobain, "it wasn't until Kurt Cobain took his own life in 1994 that the idea of the 27 Club arrived in the popular zeitgeist." Cross claims that the "launch of the Club concept" can be traced to two factors. The first was the growing influence of the Internet and sensational celebrity journalism on popular culture in the years following Cobain's death. The second was how media outlets chose to interpret a statement by Cobain's mother, Wendy Fradenburg Cobain O'Connor, quoted in the local Aberdeen, Washington, newspaper The Daily World, and subsequently carried worldwide by the Associated Press (AP): "Now he's gone and joined that stupid club. I told him not to join that stupid club." Many contemporary journalists interpreted her words as referring to the infamous untimely deaths of fellow rock musicians like Hendrix, Joplin, and Morrison, a view shared by Cross and R. Gary Patterson, chronicler of rock music urban legend.

That's really selfish to live to 90 years old unless you have something to offer like maybe William Burroughs. I definitely don't want to be that old. I feel more bonded with the Jim Morrison type of living on the edge, rock & roll poet, in a conservative way.
–Kurt Cobain

The intended meaning of "that stupid club" referred to by Cobain's mother is disputed. In his analysis of how her quote helped popularize the 27 Club, Eric Segalstad, author of The 27s: The Greatest Myth of Rock & Roll (2008), asserted that she was actually referring to the "tragic family matter" of Cobain's two uncles and his great-uncle, all of whom had committed suicide. Other contemporary journalists linked her quote to the then-recent heroin-related deaths of fellow young Seattle rock musicians Stefanie Sargent of 7 Year Bitch and Andrew Wood of Mother Love Bone, both aged 24. Cross, himself, dismissed "the absurd notion that Kurt Cobain intentionally timed his death so he could join the 27 Club", noting that Cobain "had nearly died from drug overdoses on at least two dozen occasions in the year before his death... [and] made several previous suicide attempts at various ages."

In 2011, Amy Winehouse died at the age of 27, prompting a renewed swell of media attention devoted to the 27 Club. Three years earlier, Winehouse's personal assistant, Alex Haines, told the British press that Winehouse, then 25, feared she would join Jim Morrison, Brian Jones, and Kurt Cobain in dying at 27: "She reckoned she would join the 27 Club of rock stars who died at that age. She told me, 'I have a feeling I'm gonna die young.'"

=== White lighter myth ===
A derivative urban legend emerged in the popular culture of smoking and cannabis as the so-called white lighter myth or white lighter curse. It purports that Hendrix, Joplin, Morrison, Cobain, and others linked to the 27 Club died while in possession of a white disposable cigarette lighter, leading such items to become associated with bad fortune. Snopes discredited the theory in 2017, noting that disposable Bic lighters did not enter production until 1973 — several years after the deaths of Hendrix, Joplin, and Morrison — and disposable lighters from other companies were not widely available before then.

== Scientific studies ==
Despite the cultural significance given to musician and celebrity deaths at age 27, the common claim that they are statistically more common at this age is an urban myth, refuted by scientific research.

Statistical evidence collected in 2014 by public health researcher Dianna Kenny suggested that popular musicians were most likely to die at the age of 56 (2.2% compared to 1.3% at 27). A 2011 study in the British Medical Journal found that the risk of death for musicians at the age of 27 was the same as for ages 25 and 32. The study noted that young adult musicians had a higher death rate than the general young adult population, concluding that "fame may increase the risk of death among musicians, but this risk is not limited to age 27."

Research published in PNAS in 2024 indicated that the myth of the 27 Club became self-perpetuating after a statistically-improbable coincidence captured the public imagination, producing much greater cultural interest in those who died at age 27 than there would have been otherwise.

== In popular culture ==
The 27 Club appears by name and reference in popular culture and mass media. Several exhibitions have been based on the concept, as well as novels, films, stage plays, songs, video games, and comics.

=== Music ===
- The title of the song "27" by Fall Out Boy from their fourth studio album Folie à Deux (2008) is a reference to the club. The lyrics explore the hedonistic lifestyles common in rock and roll. Pete Wentz, the primary lyricist of Fall Out Boy, wrote the song because he felt that he was living a similarly dangerous lifestyle.
- John Craigie's song "28", which appeared on his first "official" studio album Montana Tale (2009), and live album Opening for Steinbeck (2018), is written from the perspective of 27 Club members Jim Morrison, Janis Joplin, and Kurt Cobain, as each contemplates their respective mortality and imagines what they would do differently "if I could only make it to twenty-eight". Craigie wrote the song when he himself was age 27.
- The theme is referenced in the song "27 Forever" by Eric Burdon, on his studio album 'Til Your River Runs Dry (2013).
- Magenta's studio album The Twenty Seven Club (2013) references the club. Each track is a tribute to a member of the club.
- Halsey's song "Colors", from her debut studio album Badlands (2015), includes the line "I hope you make it to the day you're 28 years old."
- Mac Miller's song "Brand Name", from his third studio album GO:OD AM (2015), features the line "To everyone who sell me drugs, don't mix it with that bullshit, I'm hopin' not to join the 27 Club."
- Frank Ocean referenced the club and the white lighter myth on the song "Nights" from his second studio album Blonde (2016), where he says: "No white lighters 'til I fuck my twenty-eighth up."
- JPEGMafia's debut studio album Black Ben Carson (2016) includes a song titled "The 27 Club", which the song refers to the club. He references members Jimi Hendrix, Janis Joplin, and Kurt Cobain.
- Adore Delano released a song called "27 Club" on her third studio album Whatever (2017), with the repeated lyric "All of the legends die at twenty-seven." Delano was aged 27 at the time of release.
- Juice Wrld referenced the club on his song "Legends" (2018), where he says: "What's the 27 Club? We ain't making it past 21."
- Nessa Barrett's song "La Di Die", released in collaboration with Jxdn in 2021, contains a reference to the club: "I'll be dead at 27, only nine more years to go."

== See also ==
- 27 Club graffiti in Tel Aviv
- Apophenia
- Celebrity death rule of threes
- Curse of the ninth
- List of deaths in popular music
- List of murdered hip-hop musicians
- Saturn return

== Bibliography ==
- Sounes, Howard (2013). 27: A History of the 27 Club through the Lives of Brian Jones, Jimi Hendrix, Janis Joplin, Jim Morrison, Kurt Cobain, and Amy Winehouse. Da Capo Press. ISBN 978-0-306-82168-4. pp. 304, 306.
- Dunning, Brian (October 24, 2023). "Skeptoid #907: The Science of the 27 Club". Skeptoid.
