= The Complete Mike Oldfield =

Compilation album by Mike Oldfield
- Released: 21 October 1985
- Recorded: 1972 – 1984
- Genre: Progressive rock
- Length: 1:57:45
- Label: Virgin
- Producers: Mike Oldfield; David Hentschel; Simon Phillips; Simon Heyworth; Tom Newman

Mike Oldfield chronology
Episodes (1981)	The Complete Mike Oldfield (1985)	A Virgin Compilation (1987)

The Complete Mike Oldfield is a compilation album by Mike Oldfield, released on 21 October 1985 by Virgin Records in the UK.

The double album is subdivided into four sections, with The instrumental section and The Vocal section containing shorter pieces, and The Complex section and The Live section containing excerpts from Oldfield's longer pieces.

Some versions of the vinyl have fewer or different tracks, with "The Instrumental Section" missing "In Dulci Jubilo" and "Portsmouth", while other versions replaced "Mistake" with "Pictures in the Dark".

== Track listing ==
=== Side 1 - The Instrumental Section ===
1. "Arrival" – 2:47
2. "William Tell Overture" – 3:55
3. "Cuckoo Song" – 3:13
4. "In Dulci Jubilo" – 2:50
5. "Portsmouth" – 2:02
6. "Jungle Gardenia" – 2:37
7. "Guilty" – 4:04
8. "Blue Peter" – 2:07
9. "Waldberg" (The Peak) – 3:24
10. "Wonderful Land" – 3:39
11. "Etude" (Theme from The Killing Fields) – 3:07

=== Side 2 - The Vocal Section ===
1. "Moonlight Shadow" – 3:36
2. "Family Man" – 3:47
3. "Mistake" – 2:55 or "Pictures In The Dark" – 4:18
4. "Five Miles Out" – 4:19
5. "Crime of Passion" – 3:37
6. "To France" – 4:33
7. "Shadow on the Wall" (12" Version) – 5:08

=== Side 3 - The Complex Section ===
1. "Excerpt from Ommadawn" – 6:59
2. "Excerpt from Tubular Bells" – 7:59
3. "Excerpt from Hergest Ridge" – 4:20
4. "Excerpt from Incantations" – 4:41
5. "Evacuation" (Excerpt from The Killing Fields) – 4:11

=== Side 4 - The Live Section ===
1. "Sheba" (Live) – 3:30
2. "Mirage" (Live) – 5:12
3. "Platinum" (Live) – 14:28
4. "Mount Teide" (Live) – 4:34

== Certifications ==
Region	Certification	Certified units/sales
France (SNEP)	Platinum	300,000^{*}
Germany (BVMI)	Gold	250,000^{^}
Spain (Promusicae)	Gold	50,000^{^}
Switzerland (IFPI Switzerland)	Gold	25,000^{^}
United Kingdom (BPI)	Gold	100,000^{^}
^{*} Sales figures based on certification alone.^{^} Shipments figures based on certification alone.
