= Crises (album) =

Studio album by Mike Oldfield
- Released: 27 May 1983
- Recorded: November 1982–April 1983
- Studios: Tilehouse Studios, Denham, Buckinghamshire
- Genres: Progressive rock, pop rock
- Length: 37:14; 40:09 (North American release)
- Label: Virgin
- Producers: Mike Oldfield; Simon Phillips

Mike Oldfield chronology
Five Miles Out (1982)	Crises (1983)	Discovery (1984)

Singles from Crises
- 1. "Mistake" Released: 20 August 1982; 2. "Moonlight Shadow" Released: 6 May 1983; 3. "Shadow on the Wall" Released: 5 September 1983

Professional ratings
Review scores
Source	Rating
AllMusic	2.5/5 stars

Crises is the eighth studio album by English musician and songwriter Mike Oldfield, released on 27 May 1983 on Virgin Records. Oldfield started recording the album towards the end of his 1982 tour supporting his previous record, Five Miles Out. It marked a continuation of Oldfield's experimentation with more accessible music which began in the late 1970s; side one contains the 20-minute "Crises" and side two contains a collection of shorter songs which feature vocalists Maggie Reilly, Jon Anderson, and Roger Chapman. Oldfield produced Crises with drummer Simon Phillips, who also plays on the album.

Crises reached No. 6 on the UK Albums Chart and became Oldfield's most successful record of the 1980s following the release of the single "Moonlight Shadow", which went to number one in nine countries and sold in excess of a million units. Oldfield supported the album with the Crises Tour across Europe in 1983 that featured most of the musicians that played on the album.

== Background and recording ==
By the 1980s, Oldfield had shifted musical direction from the longform compositions that he had become known for throughout the previous decade, towards more commercial and straightforward rock and pop songs. By the time he had finished the 1982 world tour in support of his previous album Five Miles Out in December of that same year, Oldfield had already started work on a follow-up. Crises sees Oldfield explore heavy metal elements which he had been a fan of for some time and enjoyed playing.

Oldfield described side one as material that he had wanted to write and perform "for personal satisfaction", while side two is "very commercial, full of singles". He added: "It's a case of keeping everybody happy." The North American version of Crises featured a different running order to capitalize on the commercial songs by switching the order of the sides, adding the non-album single "Mistake" as the lead track, and moving "Moonlight Shadow" to the end of its side. This North American version has not been reissued since its initial pressing. The "Moonlight Shadow" single from this album includes the rare track "Rite of Man".

The album was recorded from November 1982 to April 1983 at Tilehouse Studios in Denham, Buckinghamshire, using an Ampex ATR 124 tape recorder, a Neve 8108 with Necam console and Westlake Monitors. Oldfield used a Gibson SG Junior for overdriven guitar sounds and a Fender Stratocaster for clean sounds. Tama drums were Simon Phillips' brand of choice for drums on the album; Phillips also did some production work. Oldfield makes extensive use of Oberheim and Fairlight keyboards. Asked how he recruited Chapman and Anderson in an interview, Oldfield answered "we just hang out in the same bar".

== Songs ==
=== Side one ===
The title track of the album is a twenty-minute-long piece, featuring a small amount of vocals, sung by Oldfield. The beginning and end of the track are driven by a synthesised lead passage, stylistically similar to the opening theme to Oldfield's Tubular Bells. Oldfield rated "Crises" as one of the best tracks he had done since "Tubular Bells".

=== Side two ===
"Moonlight Shadow" features Oldfield's touring vocalist Maggie Reilly, who had also sung on his previous albums. Oldfield had singer Hazel O'Connor sing on an early version of the track, which was then titled "Moment of Passion", but it failed to produce sufficient results. He then booked Reilly for a studio session, for which he prepared by drinking wine and writing a set of lyrics using a rhyming dictionary. Reilly sang the lyrics in a rock style at first, which prompted Oldfield to suggest a softer tone and "in the manner of a lullaby". The idea worked, despite recording the song in small sections and using multiple drop-ins which took some time to finalise and piece together.

"In High Places" was written by Oldfield with lyrics by himself and Yes vocalist Jon Anderson, who sings on the track. The pair had worked on several occasions prior to recording Crises, and Oldfield had enjoyed Anderson's vocal style and how easy it was working with him. Anderson was living in Barbados at the time of writing, so Oldfield phoned him from England and sang the song's tune to him, after which Anderson went away and wrote lyrics to it. The two later met and finished the song in Oldfield's studio. The track features Pierre Moerlen, who had toured with Oldfield and played on his albums, on vibraphone. On the occasion of Virgin Records founder Richard Branson's launch of the then-largest hot-air balloon ever made, the song was released as a single in 1987, four years after the Crises LP.

"Foreign Affair" features Reilly on vocals, who co-wrote the lyrics with Oldfield.

"Taurus 3", a short fast-paced guitar piece unlike the previous two long multi-themed "Taurus" tracks featured on QE2 and Five Miles Out respectively.

"Shadow on the Wall" features vocals by Roger Chapman. Oldfield wrote the song with Chapman's voice in mind.

== Artwork ==
The album's cover art was by Terry Ilott and was originally created as an illustration for an edition of J. G. Ballard's The Drowned World. Oldfield makes reference to the artwork with the line, "the watcher and the tower, waiting hour, by hour" (printed in the back cover of the LP, and sung by Mike Oldfield on the title track). In the interview mentioned before, Oldfield stated that "I'm the man in the corner, and the tower is my music".

== Charts ==
It spent 19 weeks on Norway's album chart, peaking at No. 1 for two weeks, and is Oldfield's best selling album there. The album also topped the charts in Germany and Sweden.

=== Weekly charts ===
Chart (1983)	Peak position
Australia (Kent Music Report)	17
Austrian Albums (Ö3 Austria)	2
Canada (RPM) (3 weeks@57)	57
Dutch Albums (Album Top 100)	2
German Albums (Offizielle Top 100)	1
New Zealand Albums (RMNZ)	6
Norwegian Albums (VG-lista)	1
Scottish Albums (Official Charts)	74
Spanish Albums (AFYVE)	1
Swedish Albums (Sverigetopplistan)	1
Swiss Albums (Schweizer Hitparade)	5
UK Albums (Official Charts)	6
UK Rock & Metal Albums (Official Charts)	7

=== Year-end charts ===
Chart (1983)	Position
Austrian Albums (Ö3 Austria)	6
Dutch Albums (Album Top 100)	11
German Albums (Offizielle Top 100)	3
New Zealand Albums (RMNZ)	40

== Certifications ==
Region	Certification	Certified units/sales
France (SNEP)	Gold	100,000^{*}
Germany (BVMI)	Platinum	500,000^{^}
Netherlands (NVPI)	Gold	50,000^{^}
Italy (FIMI)	Gold	50,000^{*}
Spain (Promusicae)	Platinum	100,000^{^}
United Kingdom (BPI)	Gold	100,000^{^}
^{*} Sales figures based on certification alone.^{^} Shipments figures based on certification alone.

== Track listing ==
All songs by Mike Oldfield, additional writers where noted.

=== UK vinyl ===
Side one
No.	Title	Lead Vocals	Length
1.	"Crises"	Oldfield	20:40

Side two
No.	Title	Lyrics	Lead Vocals	Length
2.	"Moonlight Shadow"		Maggie Reilly	3:34
3.	"In High Places"	Jon Anderson, Oldfield	Anderson	3:33
4.	"Foreign Affair"	Oldfield, Reilly	Reilly	3:53
5.	"Taurus 3"		Instrumental	2:25
6.	"Shadow on the Wall"		Roger Chapman	3:09
Total length:				37:14

=== North American vinyl ===
Side one
No.	Title	Lyrics	Lead Vocals	Length
1.	"Mistake"		Reilly	2:55
2.	"In High Places"	Anderson, Oldfield	Anderson	3:33
3.	"Foreign Affair"	Oldfield, Reilly	Reilly	3:53
4.	"Taurus 3"		Instrumental	2:25
5.	"Shadow on the Wall"		Chapman	3:09
6.	"Moonlight Shadow"		Reilly	3:34

Side two
No.	Title	Lead Vocals	Length
7.	"Crises"	Oldfield	20:40
Total length:			40:09

== Personnel ==
- Mike Oldfield – electric guitars (all tracks except "Foreign Affair" & "Taurus 3"), Ovation Adamus electroacoustic guitar ("Taurus 3"), Ramirez Spanish guitar ("Taurus 3"), Manson acoustic guitar ("Taurus 3"), electric bass guitar ("Crises", "Shadow on the Wall" "Mistake"), acoustic bass guitar ("Taurus 3"), mandolin ("Crises", "Taurus 3"), banjo ("Shadow on the Wall"), harp ("Crises"), Fairlight CMI (all tracks except "Taurus 3"), Roland string synthesiser ("Crises", "In High Places", "Foreign Affair" "Shadow on the Wall"), Oberheim OB-Xa synthesiser ("Crises", "In High Places"), piano ("Crises"), Farfisa organ ("Crises"), Prophet 5 synthesiser ("Crises"), Oberheim DSX digital polyphonic sequencer ("Crises"), Oberheim DMX drum machine & Simmons electronic drums ("Crises"), bells & tambourine & shaker ("Taurus 3"), vocals ("Crises", "Mistake"), Quantec Room Simulator digital reverb ("Crises"), all instruments ("Jungle Gardenia", "Crime of Passion")

Additional musicians

- Maggie Reilly – vocals on "Moonlight Shadow", "Foreign Affair", and "Mistake"
- Jon Anderson – vocals on "In High Places"
- Roger Chapman – vocals on "Shadow on the Wall"
- Simon Phillips – acoustic Tama drums (all tracks except "Mistake"), special effects; shaker on "Foreign Affair" and "Taurus 3"; finger-snaps, bells, tambourine, and boots on "Taurus 3"
- Anthony Glynne (credited as "Ant") – guitars on "Crises" and "Shadow on the Wall"
- Rick Fenn – guitar on "Crises"
- Phil Spalding – bass guitar on "Crises" and "Moonlight Shadow"
- Pierre Moerlen – vibraphone on "In High Places", percussion on "Mistake"
- Tim Cross - keyboards on "Mistake"
- Tim Renwick – guitars on "Mistake"
- Morris Pert – percussion & keyboards on "Mistake"
- Barry Palmer - vocals on "Mistake," lead vocals on "Crime of Passion"

Production

- Mike Oldfield – producer
- Nigel Luby – engineer
- Simon Phillips – co-producer, engineer (uncredited)

== Mercury Records 2013 re-issue ==
Crises was re-issued by Mercury Records on 2 September 2013, along with Five Miles Out. It is available as a single CD, a 2CD Deluxe Edition (album disc and live highlights CD), a vinyl LP and a 5 disc (3 CD and 2 DVD) boxed set. The boxed set also includes a 32-page hardback book. There was also a 500 copy limited edition vinyl available on transparent green vinyl. The re-issue is also available as digital download in 16 and 24 bit 44.1 kHz FLAC/ALAC and 320 kbit/s MP3 in two versions. The super-deluxe edition contains the tracks of discs one through three, the LP contains the tracks of the single CD.

This reissue reached #30 in Germany's Media Control Charts in September 2013.

=== Track listing ===
==== Single disc edition ====
1. "Crises" (2013 Remaster) 20:57
2. "Moonlight Shadow" (2013 Remaster) 3:38
3. "In High Places" (2013 Remaster) 3:33
4. "Foreign Affair" (2013 Remaster) 3:53
5. "Taurus 3" (2013 Remaster) 2:25
6. "Shadow on the Wall" (2013 Remaster) 3:10
7. "Moonlight Shadow "(2013 Unplugged Mix) 3:35
8. "Shadow on the Wall" (2013 Unplugged Mix) 3:21
9. "Mistake" (2013 Remaster) 2:56
10. "Crime of Passion" (Extended Version / 2013 Remaster) 4:10
11. "Jungle Gardenia" (2013 Remaster) 2:46
12. "Moonlight Shadow" (12" single / 2013 Remaster) 5:15
13. "Shadow on the Wall" (12" single / 2013 Remaster) 5:09

==== Deluxe Edition ====
Disc 1
As per single disc edition

Disc 2

Live Highlights from Wembley Arena 22 July 1983 Crises Tour

1. "Taurus I" 9:14
2. "Taurus II" 23:08
3. "Crises" 23:15
4. "Moonlight Shadow" 5:28
5. "Shadow on the Wall" 6:26
6. "Family Man" 4:14

==== 30th Anniversary Box Set ====
Disc 1
As per single disc edition

Disc 2

Live at Wembley Arena 22 July 1983 Crises Tour

1. "Woodhenge" / "Incantations Part Three" 8:09
2. "Sheba" 3:23
3. "Ommadawn Part One" 8:52
4. "Mount Teidi" 4:10
5. "Five Miles Out" 5:03
6. "Tubular Bells Part One" 18:44

Disc 3
As per Deluxe edition Disc 2

Disc 4 – DVD

1. "Crises" (Live at Wembley Arena) 22:35
2. "Tubular Bells Part One" (Live at Wembley Arena) 19:10
3. "Moonlight Shadow" 3:42
4. "Shadow on the Wall" 3:08
5. "Moonlight Shadow" (BBC Top of the Pops 23 June 1983) 3:15
6. "Crime of Passion" 3:42

Disc 5 – DVD

2013 Remaster / 5.1 Surround Sound

1. "Crises" 20:38
2. "Moonlight Shadow" 4:00
3. "In High Places" 3:53
4. "Foreign Affair" 4:13
5. "Taurus 3" 2:50
6. "Shadow on the Wall" 5:13

=== Charts ===
Chart (2013)	Peak position
Austrian Albums (Ö3 Austria)	73
French Albums (SNEP)	144
German Albums (Offizielle Top 100)	20
Spanish Albums (Promusicae)	39
Swiss Albums (Schweizer Hitparade)	87
UK Albums (Official Charts)	71

== Cover versions ==
A number of songs from Crises have been covered by numerous acts, with "Moonlight Shadow" being the most popular. Dance act Groove Coverage took their cover of "Moonlight Shadow" to number 3 in the German charts. A 2009 cover version of "Foreign Affair" by Belgian dance band Sylver spent 8 weeks in the top 10 of the Belgian single charts, peaking at #3.

American rapper Kanye West samples Oldfield's song "In High Places". West incorporated the song's chorus into his song "Dark Fantasy" from his 2010 album My Beautiful Dark Twisted Fantasy.
