= One on One (song) =

1983 single by Daryl Hall & John Oates

Single by Daryl Hall & John Oates

from the album H_{2}O
- B-side: "Art of Heartbreak"
- Released: January 1983
- Recorded: December 1981
- Studio: Electric Lady, New York City
- Genre: Soft rock; blue-eyed soul
- Length: 4:17 (album version); 3:53 (single version); 5:31 (club mix)
- Label: RCA Victor
- Songwriter: Daryl Hall
- Producers: Daryl Hall; John Oates

Daryl Hall & John Oates singles chronology
"Maneater" (1982)	"One on One" (1983)	"Family Man" (1983)

Music video
- "One on One" on YouTube

"One on One" is a song by American musical duo Daryl Hall & John Oates. Written by Daryl Hall, it was released in January 1983 as the second single from their eleventh studio album, H_{2}O (1982). The track features a sparse, synthesizer-driven arrangement that reflects the duo’s early 1980s pop-soul sound. The lyrics use sports metaphors, particularly from basketball, to describe seduction and intimacy.

Daryl Hall sings the lead vocal, while John Oates contributes backing harmony vocals. "One on One" peaked at number seven on the US Billboard Hot 100 and number five on the US Cash Box Top 100, becoming one of three top ten singles from H_{2}O, alongside "Maneater" and "Family Man".

== Music video ==
The song's music video, directed by Mick Haggerty and C.D. Taylor, depicts Hall walking around a New York City street singing the song, interspersed with shots of him performing on a stage with Oates. Robert Christgau of The Village Voice named it the eighth-best video of the year in his ballot for the annual Pazz & Jop critics' poll.

== Reception ==
Cash Box praised the "straightforward vocals", "church-like synthesizer portion and a steady drum beat." Billboard praised "Hall's convincing solo vocal."

== Covers and samples ==
Smooth jazz saxophonist Warren Hill covered "One on One" for his fifth studio album Life Through Rose Coloured Glasses (1998). The song was also covered by indie pop duo The Bird and the Bee for their Hall & Oates tribute album Interpreting the Masters Volume 1: A Tribute to Daryl Hall and John Oates. Indie rock band Fruit Bats performed a live rendition of "One on One" for The A.V. Club's A.V. Undercover web series in 2010. Alternative hip hop group Fun Lovin' Criminals sampled "One on One" for their song "Sugar", from their album 100% Colombian (1998).

The song's popularity and various lyrical references to basketball led to it being used in several National Basketball Association (NBA) commercials in the mid-1980s. One such commercial featured Los Angeles Lakers small forward James Worthy performing a 360-degree spin move in slow motion during the song's saxophone solo.

== Charts ==
=== Weekly charts ===
Weekly chart performance for "One on One"
Chart (1983)	Peak position
Australia (KMR)	77
Canada (RPM) Top Singles	6
Canada Adult Contemporary (RPM)	2
New Zealand (Recorded Music NZ)	21
UK Singles (Official Charts Company)	63
US Cash Box Top 100	5
US Billboard Hot 100	7
US Adult Contemporary (Billboard)	4
US Hot R&B/Hip-Hop Songs (Billboard)	8
US Radio & Records CHR/Pop Airplay Chart	2

=== Year-end charts ===
Year-end chart performance for "One on One"
Chart (1983)	Rank
Canada RPM Top Singles	58
US Cash Box Top 100	32
US Billboard Hot 100	39
US Radio & Records CHR/Pop Airplay Chart	20
US Radio & Records Black Radio Airplay Chart	64
