= Five Miles Out =

Studio album by Mike Oldfield
- Released: 19 March 1982
- Recorded: September 1981–January 1982
- Studio: Tilehouse (Denham, Buckinghamshire); The Manor (Shipton-on-Cherwell, Oxfordshire)
- Genre: Progressive rock, pop rock
- Length: 49:56
- Label: Virgin
- Producer: Mike Oldfield

Mike Oldfield chronology
QE2 (1980)	Five Miles Out (1982)	Crises (1983)

Singles from Five Miles Out
- 1. "Five Miles Out" Released: March 1982; 2. "Family Man" Released: May 1982

Five Miles Out is the seventh studio album by English recording artist Mike Oldfield, released on 19 March 1982 by Virgin Records in the UK. After touring in support of his previous album, QE2 (1980), ended in mid-1981, Oldfield started on a follow-up with members of his touring band performing the music. The album features the 24-minute track "Taurus II" on side one and four shorter songs on side two. The songs "Family Man" and "Orabidoo" are credited to Oldfield and members of his touring band which included vocalist Maggie Reilly, drummer Morris Pert, and guitarist Rick Fenn.

Five Miles Out marked the beginning of a commercially successful period for Oldfield who scored his first UK top 10 album in seven years, peaking at No. 7. Two of the album's shorter songs, "Five Miles Out" and "Family Man", were released as singles which peaked at Nos. 43 and 45 in the UK, respectively. The latter became a bigger hit when pop duo Hall and Oates recorded a cover of the song. Five Miles Out was further promoted with the 100-date Five Miles Out World Tour 1982, the largest tour of Oldfield's career. It was reissued in 2013 with new stereo and 5.1 surround sound mixes and previously unreleased material.

== Background ==
In August 1981, Oldfield completed his European Adventure Tour 1981 which was staged in support of his previous studio album, QE2 (1980). The tour saw Oldfield perform with a group consisting of drummers/percussionists Mike Frye and Morris Pert, guitarist/bassist Rick Fenn, keyboardist Tim Cross, and vocalist Maggie Reilly. In the month following the tour, Oldfield started work on a follow-up at Tilehouse Studios, his home recording studio in Denham, Buckinghamshire. Recording took place between September 1981 and January 1982 with an Ampex ATR-124 24-track machine. The music was performed by Oldfield and his six-piece band with Graham Broad on additional drums.

== Songs ==
=== Side one ===
"Taurus II" occupies the entire first side of the album. At 24 minutes in length, it features a variety of melodies and instrumental settings. It features many familiar sounds from his earlier albums, such as uilleann pipes and female chorus, and extensive use of the Fairlight CMI. The vocal section, called "The Deep Deep Sound", features themes from "Taurus I" from QE2. The main theme from "Taurus I" is referenced once more in the following section. Oldfield's 1981 track "Royal Wedding Anthem", written and performed for the Wedding of Charles, Prince of Wales, and Lady Diana Spencer, also has similarities to "Taurus II".

=== Side two ===
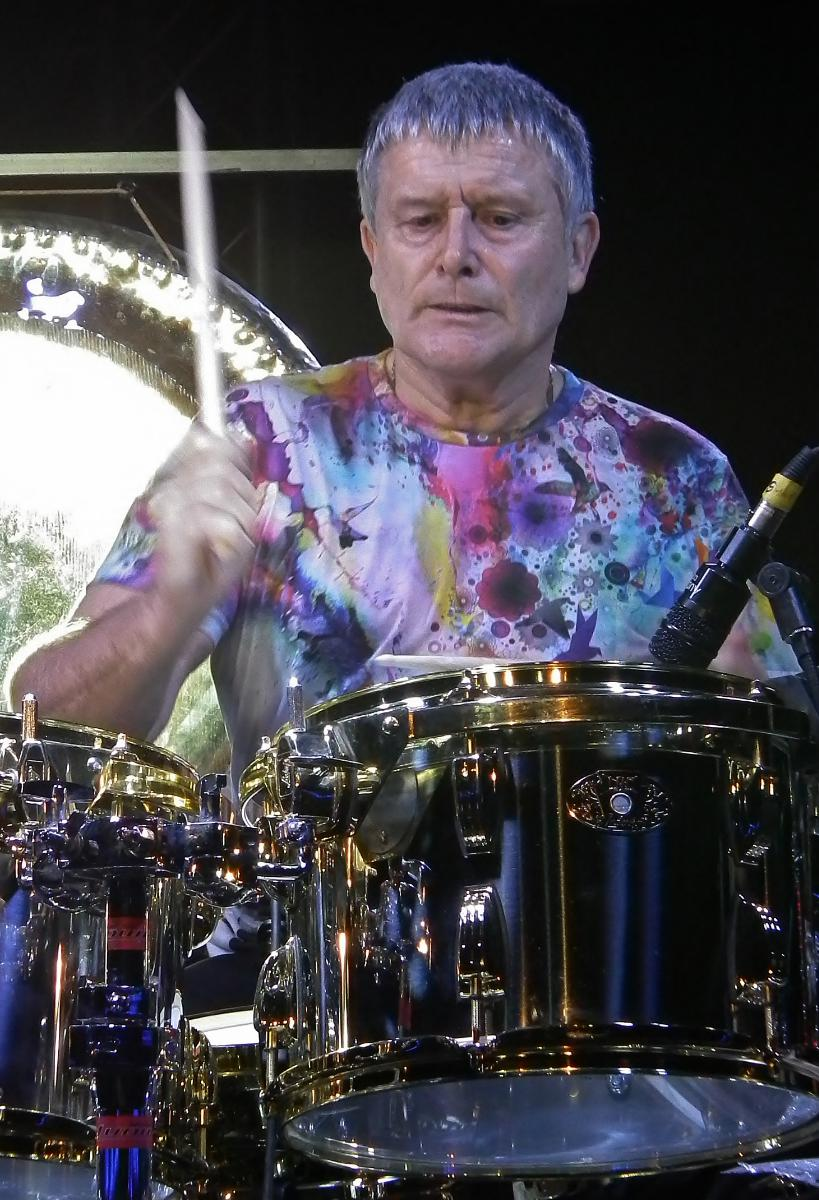
"Mount Teidi" features Carl Palmer on drums

"Family Man" is a rock song that is credited to Oldfield, Cross, Fenn, Frye, Reilly, and Pert. The main guitar riff was devised by Fenn, from which Oldfield wrote the chorus and Reilly the verses with assistance from Cross. Hall & Oates covered the song in 1982 for their album H_{2}O, with their version reaching No. 6 on the US pop charts and No. 15 in the UK. It thus became one of the very few songs penned by Oldfield to chart in the United States.

"Orabidoo" is the second track credited to the group. It features vocals from Oldfield and Reilly through the use of a vocoder. The track opens with the theme to "Conflict" from QE2 and closes with Reilly singing three verses about "Ireland's Eye" accompanied by acoustic guitar. A sample from the Alfred Hitchcock film Young and Innocent (1937) is heard, specifically the moment where the conductor of a dance band criticises the drummer: "Don't come in again like that. It isn't funny and I pay someone else to make the orchestrations!"

"Mount Teidi" is an instrumental named after Mount Teide on Tenerife, Canary Islands and features drummer Carl Palmer. Oldfield recalled that some of the music was originally scribed on a sheet of cigarette rolling paper so that he would not forget the idea.

"Five Miles Out" features vocals from Reilly and Oldfield, who sings through a vocoder. It was inspired by a near fatal flight that Oldfield had experienced from Barcelona to San Sebastián, where the inexperienced pilot received an incorrect weather forecast and flew through a thunderstorm. When it came to writing the lyrics, Oldfield visited a local pub, "lined up a few pints of Guinness", and wrote the words using a rhyming dictionary with the aeronautical terms he could think of as a basis. The song features the same guitar riff that appears at the beginning of "Taurus II".

== Cover ==
The cover features a Lockheed Model 10 Electra aircraft, with similar markings to the one flown by Amelia Earhart in 1937. This is often mistaken for a Beechcraft Model 18 (a very similar aircraft) and is referred to in the lyrics of "Five Miles Out"; "lost in static, 18" and "automatic, 18". The aeroplane has registration G-MOVJ, as also referenced in the lyrics (as "Golf Mike Oscar Victor Juliet"). The airplane that Oldfield owned at that time was, instead, a Piper PA-31 Navajo.

The inner liner notes (originally the inner gatefold of the vinyl sleeve) feature the track sheet for "Taurus II", with the lyrics of "Five Miles Out" embedded within. The track sheet shows the layout of instruments on the 24 track tape.

== Release and reception ==
Professional ratings
Review scores
Source	Rating
AllMusic	4/5 stars
High Fidelity	(not rated)

Five Miles Out, the album, was more popular than Oldfield's previous few releases. It charted at No. 7 in the UK, whereas both QE2 (1980) and Platinum (1979) had failed to reach the top twenty. Oldfield's commercial revival would continue with subsequent albums Crises (1983) and Discovery (1984). In Canada, the album reached No. 29 on the top 50 albums list on 2 separate occasion in May and June, then made a brief re-appearance at No. 72 in October's new top 100 album chart.

The Five Miles Out World Tour 1982 was staged to promote the album.

In September 2013, the album was reissued as a single CD, vinyl, and a special 2 CD and DVD Deluxe Edition with a new remaster by Oldfield. The Deluxe Edition contains additional videos, live tracks from the 1982 tour, and a 5.1 surround sound mix. The reissue reached No. 48 in Germany.

== Track listing ==
Side one
No.	Title	Writer(s)	Length
1.	"Taurus II"	Mike Oldfield	24:43

Side two
No.	Title	Writer(s)	Length
1.	"Family Man"	Oldfield, Tim Cross, Rick Fenn, Mike Frye, Maggie Reilly, Morris Pert	3:45
2.	"Orabidoo"	Oldfield, Cross, Fenn, Frye, Reilly, Pert	13:03
3.	"Mount Teidi"	Oldfield	4:10
4.	"Five Miles Out"	Oldfield	4:16

== Personnel ==
Music

- Mike Oldfield – guitars, bass guitars, keyboards, percussion, Linn LM-1 drum machine, vocals, vocoder, Fairlight CMI
- Graham Broad – drums on "Five Miles Out"
- Tim Cross – keyboards
- Rick Fenn – guitar
- Mike Frye – percussion
- Maggie Reilly – vocals
- Paddy Moloney – Uilleann pipes on "Taurus II"
- Carl Palmer – drums on "Mount Teidi"
- Morris Pert – percussion, keyboards, string arrangement on "Five Miles Out"
- Martyn Ford – conductor on "Five Miles Out"

Production

- Mike Oldfield – producer, engineer
- Tom Newman – producer and engineer on "Five Miles Out"
- Richard Mainwaring – engineer on "Mount Teidi"
- Richard Barrie – technical assistant
- Fin Costello – photographer
- Gerald Coulson – cover artwork

== Charts ==
=== Weekly charts ===
Chart (1982)	Peak position
Australian Albums (Kent Music Report)	16
Austrian Albums (Ö3 Austria)	10
Canadian Albums (RPM)	29
Dutch Albums (Album Top 100)	34
German Albums (Offizielle Top 100)	7
New Zealand Albums (RMNZ)	32
Norwegian Albums (VG-lista)	16
Spain (PROMUSICAE)	3
Swedish Albums (Sverigetopplistan)	5
UK Albums (OCC)	7
US Billboard 200	164
Chart (2013)	Peak position
French Albums (SNEP)	175
German Albums (Offizielle Top 100)	48
Spanish Albums (Promusicae)	48
UK Albums (OCC)	72

=== Year-end charts ===
Chart (1982)	Position
German Albums (Offizielle Top 100)	5

== Certifications and sales ==
Region	Certification	Certified units/sales
Germany (BVMI)	Gold	250,000^{^}
Spain (Promusicae)	Platinum	100,000^{^}
United Kingdom (BPI)	Gold	100,000^{^}
^{^} Shipments figures based on certification alone.
