= Dark Fantasy (song) =

2010 song by Kanye West

Song by Kanye West

from the album My Beautiful Dark Twisted Fantasy
- Released: November 22, 2010
- Recorded: 2009–2010
- Genre: Hip hop; boom bap
- Length: 4:41
- Label: Roc-A-Fella; Def Jam
- Songwriters: Kanye West; Robert Diggs; Ernest Wilson; Onika Maraj; Jeff Bhasker; Mike Dean; Malik Jones; Mike Oldfield; Jon Anderson
- Producers: RZA; Kanye West; No I.D.; Jeff Bhasker; Mike Dean

"Dark Fantasy" is a song by American hip hop recording artist Kanye West from his fifth studio album, My Beautiful Dark Twisted Fantasy (2010). The song serves as the opening track of the album, and was written by West, Ernest Wilson, Jeff Bhasker, Mike Dean and Robert Diggs. It features an opening narrative delivered by rapper Nicki Minaj, and singers Teyana Taylor and Justin Vernon contribute to the song's hook and provide background vocals. The track heavily samples "In High Places" by Mike Oldfield (sung by Jon Anderson). The song introduces several of the themes presented on the album and features numerous pop culture references, a gospel-inspired production style, and piano-driven composition.

The song received acclaim from music critics, who praised the song as a strong opener to My Beautiful Dark Twisted Fantasy, complementing West's vocal delivery and the song's production. Despite not being released as a single, the hype generated by the release of My Beautiful Dark Twisted Fantasy caused the song to enter the Billboard Hot 100 at position 60. It was the opening song of West's 2011 setlist at the Coachella Music Festival, and was performed at the 'Vevo Presents GOOD Music' musical venue. "Dark Fantasy" was utilized in the opening sequence of West's short film Runaway, in an extended scene where West drives down an atmospheric forest road.

== Background ==
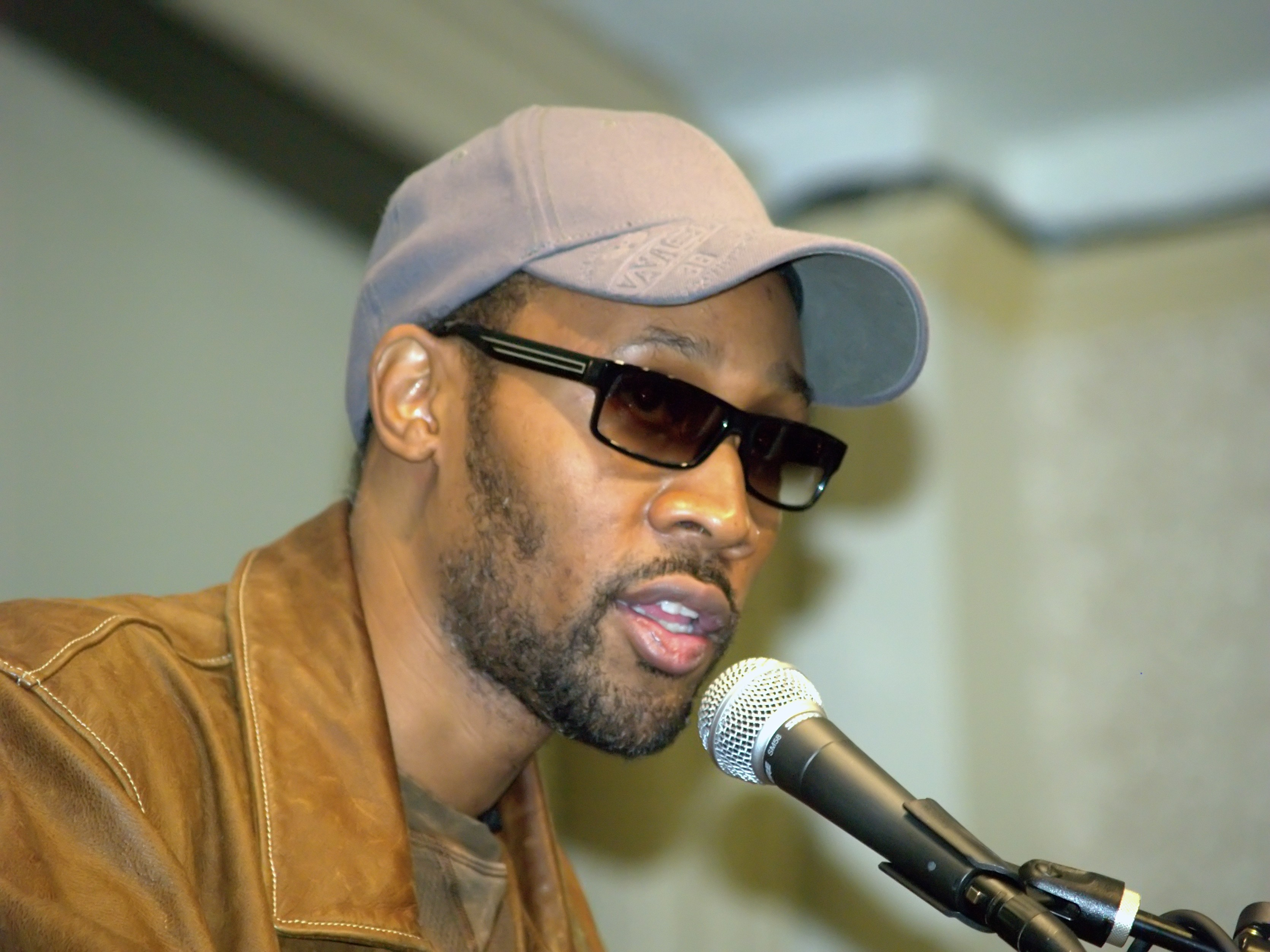
"Dark Fantasy" was partly produced by RZA of the Wu-Tang Clan, who brought his production style to the track.

Like the majority of My Beautiful Dark Twisted Fantasy, the song was recorded in Oahu, Hawaii. Following several media controversies, West decided to record his next album in a reclusive manner only working with artists he considered himself familiar with. Justin Vernon of the group Bon Iver appears on backing vocals of the track and is the first voice heard on the album. West was a fan of Bon Iver's album For Emma, Forever Ago and invited him down to Hawaii to record with him. While working there, the two became friends and reportedly produced 10 songs during their sessions together. Vernon described the process as highly artistic in nature, stating that the fourteen-hour day recording schedule allowed for a lot of fun and creativity.

The song features production by RZA of the hip-hop group Wu-Tang Clan, who commented that "Dark Fantasy" was one of the many compositions that he and West collaborated on. According to him, West had a "stack of beats" and that he tried to be as productive as possible with so much material already recorded. The style of composition is deeply influenced by producer RZA, who introduces his "bring-the-ruckus" aesthetic to the song production. Nicki Minaj was asked to open the song with a spoken word introduction, a favor she was excited to perform because she was a fan of Jay-Z, a rapper who West was recording with at the time. Minaj described both Jay-Z and West as "icons", and stated that she was blessed to be working with them.

Producer No I.D. spoke about the history of the beat, and noted that it was offered to both Drake and Jay-Z before West finally decided to use it himself. According to him, producers RZA and Pete Rock had already recorded certain portions of the song, and that he and West recorded the chorus parts. Following that, he mused "then Nicki did the intro and it went crazy. That’s one of my favorite records, just because of all the emotions that came with it.”

== Composition ==
"Dark Fantasy"
A sample of "Dark Fantasy" featuring West melodically rapping several pop culture references over the quick-paced production.

The song is introduced with a contribution from one of Minaj's alter egos; Martha Zolanski, who appears to be a rewording of the introduction to writer Roald Dahl's poetic rework of "Cinderella". West begins his verse with the refrain "I fantasized 'bout this back in Chicago". It introduces themes referenced on the majority of My Beautiful Dark Twisted Fantasy, including comments on decadence and hedonism, with West musing how "the plan was to drink until the pain was over / but what's worse, the pain or the hangover?". His lyrics on the track contain numerous musical and cultural references, including those to the song "Mercy Mercy Me (The Ecology)", the Lamborghini Murciélago sports car, rapper Nas, fashion designer Phoebe Philo, short story "The Legend of Sleepy Hollow", the band the Kings Of Leon and their song "Sex on Fire", singers Celine Dion and Leona Lewis, and television character Steve Urkel. The song contains the line "too many Urkels on your team / that's why your wins low", a double entendre. The "Winslows" were the family Urkel lived with on the show Family Matters, with the alternative meaning touching upon how his opponents' "wins are low". The chorus contains the line "can we get much higher?", another inquiry that is brought up during much of the proceeding album. The song samples a portion of "In High Places" by Mike Oldfield, a pop rock song from 1983 from the album Crises.

West raps in a highly melodic manner, almost singing some of his verses, over the brooding production style. The production style has been defined as having several similarities with West's prior composition styles. AbsolutePunk's Drew Beringer stated felt that the song sounded like West was "sampling his own source material" on the song, and felt that West embraced a "baroque instrumentation" on the track.

== Critical reception ==
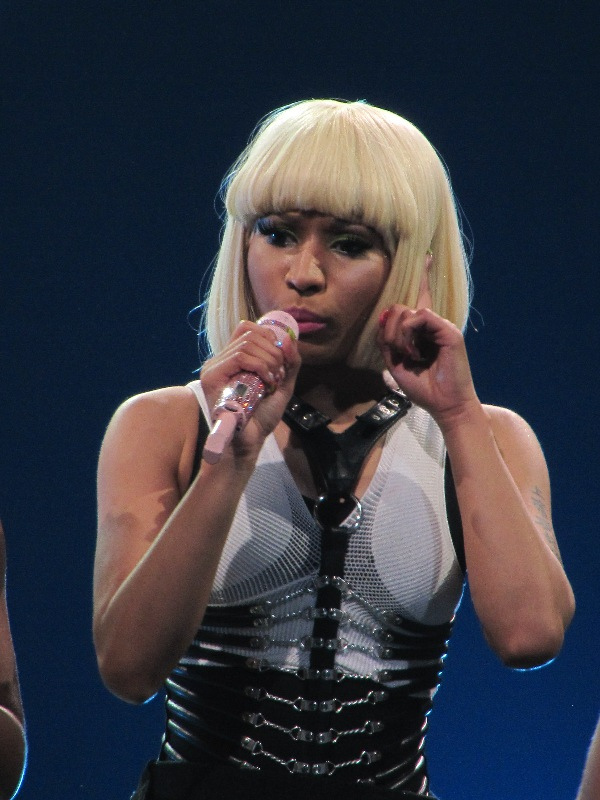
Nicki Minaj's opening spoken word verse was praised by several music critics, with her accent being cited as a highlight.

"Dark Fantasy" received acclaim by critics. The Washington Post's Chris Richards described the song as having "mutant gospel crescendos" and called it epic in nature. MTV News praised the delivery of Minaj's verse, calling it structured like a nursery rhyme, musing that it "sets the tone for the song (which is intense and hallucinatory) and the album". Rolling Stone writer Rob Sheffield praised the lyricism, describing it as witty, and wrote "in 'Dark Fantasy,' West rhymes "mercy, mercy me, that Murcielago" with "diablo," "bravado" and "My chick in that new Phoebe Philo/So much head, I woke up in Sleepy Hollow. It's some genius stuff." David Amidon of PopMatters felt that West's vocals were "layered a baker’s dozen different ways" and described the production as synthetic in nature.

Dan Vidal of URB stated that he enjoyed Minaj's verse, describing it as a "pseudo-cockney-accented opening narration" and praised the song's arrangement as "spine-tingling". David Browne of Time wrote "tracks like 'Dark Fantasy' and 'So Appalled' are built on rumbling tanks of pianos and strings that sound as if West is marching into the apocalypse." Andrew Martin of Prefix Magazine stated that the song restored his admiration for West, and that the track lived up to the hype behind it, writing "most of it is rather epic and damn good, especially this track with its classic RZA production and assistance from No I.D.." J. Tinsley of The Smoking Section commented that the song served as a successful opener, viewing it as a "boisterous firestarter combining sharp lyrics, a spurious Nicki Minaj English accent and an enormous chorus." Chris Martins of Spin complimented West's lyricism and use of double entrendres, and mused that the track was the album's "beyond luxe opener". Jonah Weiner Slate commented that West pulled off an impressive balancing act, and cited the song as an example of "his marvelous, hungry ear". Andrew Barber of Complex compared the impact of the beat to that of a cannon, calling the production team of the song a "dream team", describing the track as powerful in nature.

== Promotion ==
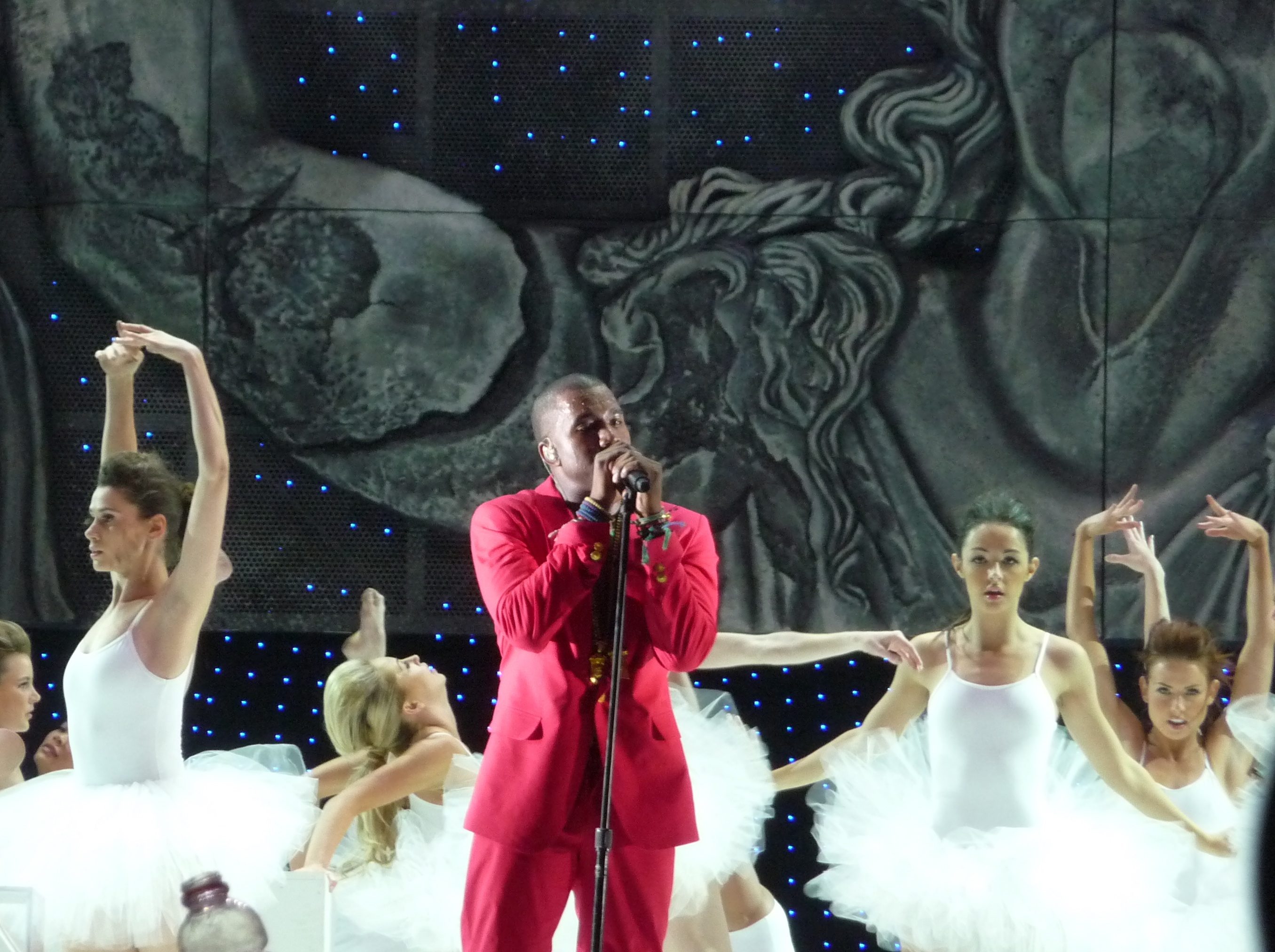
West performing at Coachella in 2011

At the 'Vevo Presents GOOD Music' musical presentation, the song was performed by both West and Taylor. The performance began with West's silhouette pressed against a glowing background, dressed in all black. During his set at the Coachella Valley Music and Arts Festival, West performed "Dark Fantasy" as the opening track.

The song was also featured as the opening track in Runaway, a 35-minute music video directed by West set to music from My Beautiful Dark Twisted Fantasy. The scene which the track is played during features West driving his MTX Tatra V8 through the forest when he crashes into a meteorite, which according to GQ, paralleled West's car accident that was the inspiration for "Through the Wire". The song was used in advertisements for the film The Hangover Part II.

Most notably, the song is featured during the farewell montage at the climax of The Hangover Part III, particularly the verse "The plan was to drink until the pain over, but what's worse, the pain or the hangover?" as it coincidentally relates to the story arc of the trilogy.

== Commercial performance ==
Due to the hype generated by the anticipation of My Beautiful Dark Twisted Fantasy, Dark Fantasy debuted on the Billboard Hot 100 at 60, without actually being released as a single. The second week it dropped to 83, and by the third week it exited the chart. The song performed similarly in Canada, charting at 67 on the Canadian Hot 100. Other than the four singles released from the album, ("Power", "All of the Lights", "Monster", and "Runaway") "Dark Fantasy" was the only song off the album to chart. The song debuted at position 10 on the Bubbling Under R&B/Hip-Hop Singles as reported by Billboard. It also appeared at position 80 on the South Korean Gaon Chart, and at 189 the following week.

== Legacy ==
In 2022, the song gained a resurgence in popularity due to an internet meme involving characters from the Japanese manga series One Piece. The meme involves a scene in the anime adaptation where the character Whitebeard shouts "The One Piece... The One Piece is real!" followed by a montage of edited images depicting him and several other One Piece characters (including Tony Tony Chopper, Monkey D. Luffy, and Portgas D. Ace), sometimes with drawn-on large penises, while the song plays in the background. The scene or audio of Whitebeard shouting is sometimes replaced with Better Call Saul actor Patrick Fabian reading the line instead.

== Personnel ==
- Kanye West - vocals, production
- Mike Dean - piano, additional production, mixing
- Jeff Bhasker - keyboards, additional production
- Chris "Hitchcock" Chorney - cello
- Jon Anderson - vocals (sample)
- Nicki Minaj - background vocals
- Justin Vernon - background vocals
- Amber Rose - additional vocals
- Teyana Taylor - additional vocals
- RZA - production
- Andrew Dawson - mixing

== Charts ==
Chart performance for "Dark Fantasy"
Chart (2010)	Peak position
South Korea (Gaon)	80
Canada (Canadian Hot 100)	67
US Billboard Hot 100	60
US Bubbling Under R&B/Hip-Hop Singles (Billboard)	10

== Certifications ==
Certifications for "Dark Fantasy"
Region	Certification	Certified units/sales
Denmark (IFPI Danmark)	Gold	45,000^{‡}
New Zealand (RMNZ)	Gold	15,000^{‡}
United Kingdom (BPI)	Silver	200,000^{‡}
United States (RIAA)	Gold	500,000^{‡}
^{‡} Sales+streaming figures based on certification alone.
