= Shadow on the Wall (song) =

Single by Mike Oldfield

Single by Mike Oldfield

from the album Crises
- B-side: "Taurus 3"
- Released: 5 September 1983
- Studio: Denham
- Genre: Hard rock
- Length: 3:09
- Label: Virgin
- Songwriter: Mike Oldfield
- Producers: Mike Oldfield; Simon Phillips

Mike Oldfield singles chronology
"Moonlight Shadow" (1983)	"Shadow on the Wall" (1983)	"Crime of Passion" (1984)

Music video
- "Shadow on the Wall" on YouTube

"Shadow on the Wall" is a single by musician Mike Oldfield, released in 1983 by Virgin Records. English rock singer Roger Chapman performs vocals on the song and it is taken from Oldfield's Crises album. The song was a hit single especially in Germanic countries.

The music video for "Shadow on the Wall" depicts an interrogation scene and was directed by Keith McMillan. The song also features on Roger Chapman's compilation albums, such as 1994's King of the Shouters where the song has been 'remastered'.

An "acoustic" mix and a 5.1 surround sound mix were released on the 2013 reissue of Crises.

The song has been covered by a number of artists including Swedish metal band Arch Enemy.

== B-side ==
The B-side is "Taurus 3", a short, fast-paced flamenco-guitar piece, which is notably different from Oldfield's long multi-themed pieces, "Taurus" and "Taurus 2", on QE2 and Five Miles Out respectively.

== Track listing ==
=== 7 inch ===
1. "Shadow on the Wall" – 3:09
2. "Taurus 3" – 2:25

=== 12 inch ===
1. "Shadow on the Wall" (Extended version) – 5:07
2. "Taurus 3" – 2:25

== Chart positions ==
=== Weekly charts ===
Chart (1983)	Peak position
Austria (Ö3 Austria Top 40)	1
Belgium (Ultratop 50 Flanders)	5
Netherlands (Dutch Top 40)	10
Netherlands (Single Top 100)	9
Spain (AFYVE)	10
Switzerland (Schweizer Hitparade)	4
UK Singles (OCC)	95
West Germany (GfK)	3

=== Year-end charts ===
Chart (1983)	Position
Netherlands (Single Top 100)	88

Chart (1984)	Position
Germany (Official German Charts)	69

== Personnel ==
- Mike Oldfield – guitars, banjo, bass, Fairlight C.M.I., Roland strings
- Roger Chapman – vocals
- Ant – guitars
- Simon Phillips – Tama drums
- Phil Spalding – backing vocals (extended version)
