= In High Places (song) =

Single by Mike Oldfield

from the album Crises
- B-side: "Poison Arrows"
- Released: 18 May 1987
- Recorded: Denham November 1982 – April 1983
- Genre: Pop rock
- Length: 3:33
- Label: Virgin
- Songwriter(s): Mike Oldfield (music); Mike Oldfield & Jon Anderson (lyrics)
- Producer(s): Mike Oldfield; Simon Phillips

Mike Oldfield singles chronology
"Shine" (1986)	"In High Places" (1987)	"Islands" (1987)

Audio video
- "In High Places (Remastered 2013)" on YouTube

"In High Places" is a song by musician Mike Oldfield, included in the 1983 album Crises and released as a single in 1987 (see 1987 in music), along with (on the B-side) "Poison Arrows" (from Discovery) and "Jungle Gardenia" (non-album track).

== Delayed single release ==
On the occasion of Virgin Records founder Richard Branson's launch of the then-largest hot-air balloon ever made, the song was released as a single in 1987 in the UK and Spain, four years after the Crises LP. It features Jon Anderson (lead singer of the progressive rock band Yes) on vocals and as co-writer.

== Use in sampling ==
"In High Places" is sampled in Kanye West's song "Dark Fantasy" from the 2010 album, My Beautiful Dark Twisted Fantasy, and in DJ Wich's song "Much Higher", from the 2008 album, The Golden Touch.

== Track listing ==
1. "In High Places" (Oldfield, Anderson) – 3:33
2. "Poison Arrows" (Oldfield) – 3:53
3. "Jungle Gardenia" (Oldfield) – 2:37
