= Mistake (Mike Oldfield song) =

Single by Mike Oldfield

from the album Crises (North American Version)
- B-side: "Waldberg (The Peak)"
- Released: 20 August 1982
- Length: 2:55
- Label: Virgin Records
- Songwriter(s): Mike Oldfield
- Producer(s): Mike Oldfield; David Hentschel

Mike Oldfield singles chronology
| "The Mike Oldfield EP" (1982) | "Mistake" (1982) | "Moonlight Shadow" (1983) |

Audio video
- "Mistake (Remastered 2013)" on YouTube

"Mistake" is a single by musician Mike Oldfield, released in 1982.

== Release ==
It was not included on any Oldfield album in Europe until the compilation The Complete Mike Oldfield in 1985; however, it was included as an extra track on the North American release of the album Crises in 1983. Maggie Reilly performs vocals on "Mistake".

== Track listing ==
1. "Mistake" – 2:55
2. "Waldberg (The Peak)" – 3:24

== Charts ==
| Chart (1982) | Peak position |
|---|---|
| West Germany (GfK) | 56 |
