= Family Man (Mike Oldfield song) =

1982 single by Mike Oldfield

Single by Mike Oldfield

from the album Five Miles Out
- B-side: "Mount Teide"
- Released: 28 May 1982
- Recorded: 1981–1982
- Studio: Tilehouse Studios, Denham, Buckinghamshire
- Genre: Progressive rock, pop rock
- Length: 3:45
- Label: Virgin
- Songwriters: Mike Oldfield; Tim Cross; Rick Fenn; Mike Frye; Morris Pert; Maggie Reilly
- Producers: Mike Oldfield; Simon Heyworth; Tom Newman

Mike Oldfield singles chronology
"Five Miles Out" (1982)	"Family Man" (1982)	"The Mike Oldfield EP" (1982)

"Family Man" is a pop rock song written by Mike Oldfield, Tim Cross, Rick Fenn, Mike Frye, Morris Pert, and Maggie Reilly. It became a hit song in 1982 for Mike Oldfield with Maggie Reilly as the vocalist. Daryl Hall and John Oates achieved success a year later with their cover version. In 2009, Maggie Reilly recorded another version of the song for her solo studio album Looking Back Moving Forward.

== Mike Oldfield version ==
=== Background ===
The song "Family Man" was first recorded and released as a single by musician Mike Oldfield in 1982 on Virgin Records. It was taken from his studio album Five Miles Out, with vocals performed by Maggie Reilly.

In the UK the single was released as a standard black 7-inch vinyl and a 7-inch picture disc featuring a photographic portrait of Oldfield. The single cover depicts a scene where a gentleman in a black suit sitting at a bar, being approached from behind by a woman in a red outfit.

=== Lyrical content ===
According to an interview in 1998, Oldfield wrote all of the music for the chorus, and verses were written by the other writers. Tim Cross has also claimed to have written the majority of the lyrics for the song, and cited Rick Fenn as the inspiration of the "family man" mentioned in the song.

The song is about a man who is being solicited by a prostitute and his protestations because he is a "family man." The original version has the woman storming off after his rejection.

=== Track listing ===
1. "Family Man" – 3:45
2. "Mount Teidi" – 4:10

=== Chart performance ===
Chart (1982)	Peak position
Canada RPM Top 50	29
UK Singles Chart	45

== Hall & Oates version ==
"Family Man"
- Original US single

Single by Daryl Hall & John Oates

from the album H_{2}O
- B-side: "Maneater"; "Open All Night"
- Released: 30 April 1983
- Studio: Electric Lady, New York City
- Genre: Synth-rock
- Length: 3:25 (album version/single version); 5:44 (extended dance mix)
- Label: RCA Records
- Songwriters: Mike Oldfield; Tim Cross; Rick Fenn; Mike Frye; Morris Pert; Maggie Reilly
- Producers: Daryl Hall; John Oates

Daryl Hall & John Oates singles chronology
"One on One" (1983)	"Family Man" (1983)	"Jingle Bell Rock" (1983)

Music video
- "Family Man" on YouTube

=== Background ===
American duo Daryl Hall & John Oates covered "Family Man" for their studio album H_{2}O, and it reached number 6 on the US Billboard Hot 100 in June 1983. Their version of the song has some altered lyrics, including a line in which the man finally gets the nerve to take up the woman's offer, but she has left, and he screams out the chorus.

Cash Box praised the vocal performance and the guitar solo.

=== Track listing ===
1. "Family Man"
2. "Maneater"
3. "Open All Night"

=== Music video ===
Three versions of the music video exist. The original, which uses the standard album/single version of the song features Daryl miming the song & John playing guitar in a room full of young children who are playing rambunctiously. The guitar solo features G.E. Smith performing while a group of young girls in sleep attire surround him to watch. Throughout the video, computer-animated lipstick kisses appear on screen and at one point across Daryl's face. There is also a computer-animated male and female figure to illustrate the characters of the song making eyes at each other, as seen on the single cover.

A second version of the video was extended to match the length of the 12" extended rock mix of the song, and features a typical American family viewing the original version of the video on their television while each of their appearances slowly transform into looking like either Daryl or John.

A later version turned up in some places such as the 7 Big Ones music video compilation LaserDisc, which is the extended video re-edited to match the album version of the song. This results in some strange shots as the video begins to be seen through the television of the family in the aforementioned version, yet the family is not shown. When the 7 Big Ones video compilation was released on DVD, the full-length extended version of the video was used.

=== Chart performance ===
Chart (1983)	Peak position
Australia (Kent Music Report)	49
Ireland (IRMA)	15
UK Singles (OCC)	15
US Billboard Hot 100	6
US Adult Contemporary (Billboard)	36
US Hot R&B/Hip-Hop Songs (Billboard)	81

Year-end chart (1983)	Rank
US Top Pop Singles (Billboard)	67
