= H2O (Hall & Oates album) =

1982 studio album by Hall & Oates

H_{2}O

Studio album by Daryl Hall & John Oates
- Released: October 4, 1982
- Recorded: 1981–1982
- Studio: Electric Lady Studios (New York City)
- Genres: Pop rock; blue-eyed soul; dance-rock
- Length: 47:08
- Label: RCA Victor
- Producers: Daryl Hall; John Oates; Neil Kernon

Daryl Hall & John Oates chronology
Private Eyes (1981)	H_{2}O (1982)	Rock 'n Soul Part 1 (1983)

Alternative cover

Singles from H2O
- 1. "Maneater" Released: October 1982; 2. "One on One" Released: January 1983; 3. "Family Man" Released: April 30, 1983; 4. "Italian Girls" Released: April 1983 (Canada only)

Professional ratings
Review scores
Source	Rating
AllMusic	4/5 stars
The Rolling Stone Album Guide	3.5/5 stars
Robert Christgau	B−

H_{2}O is the eleventh studio album by American pop rock duo Daryl Hall & John Oates, (Note: The duo is credited as "Daryl Hall + John Oates" on most releases of this album.) released by RCA Records on October 4, 1982. It peaked at number three on the Billboard 200, making it the duo's highest-charting album, and has been certified double platinum by the Recording Industry Association of America (RIAA) with sales of over two million copies. The album title is a play on the chemical formula for water, where "H" is for Hall and "O" is for Oates. It features three US top-10 singles, including "Maneater", the most successful single of their career, spending four weeks at number one on the Billboard Hot 100. The album marks the first appearance for longtime bassist and musical director Tom "T-Bone" Wolk.

== Commercial performance ==
The album debuted at number 42 on the Billboard 200 the week of October 30, 1982, as the highest debut of the week; 11 weeks later, it peaked at number three on the chart on January 15, 1983; the album spent 68 weeks on the chart. By December 1982, the album sold one million copies and it was certified platinum on December 16, 1982; it was certified double platinum by the Recording Industry Association of America (RIAA) on April 1, 1985, denoting shipments in excess of two million copies.

The album received considerable success overseas. In the UK, H_{2}O opened at number 31 on its album chart on 23 October 1982, peaking at number 24 the following week. The album remained on the chart for 35 weeks and was certified Gold by the British Phonographic Industry (BPI) on March 29, 1983, for shipments of 100,000.

== Track listing ==
Side one
No.	Title	Writer(s)	Length
1.	"Maneater"	Daryl Hall; John Oates; Sara Allen	4:33
2.	"Crime Pays"	Hall; Oates; S. Allen	4:31
3.	"Art of Heartbreak"	Hall; S. Allen; Janna Allen	3:43
4.	"One on One"	Hall	4:17
5.	"Open All Night"	Hall; S. Allen	4:35

Side two
No.	Title	Writer(s)	Length
6.	"Family Man"	Mike Oldfield; Tim Cross; Maggie Reilly; Rick Fenn; Mike Frye; Morris Pert	3:25
7.	"Italian Girls"	Oates	3:17
8.	"Guessing Games"	Hall; J. Allen	3:15
9.	"Delayed Reaction"	Hall; Oates; S. Allen	3:59
10.	"At Tension"	Oates	6:16
11.	"Go Solo"	Hall	4:35
Total length:			47:08

== Personnel ==
=== Musicians ===
- Daryl Hall – lead vocals (1–6, 8, 9, 11), backing vocals, piano, keyboards, synthesizers (Yamaha CP-30, Prophet-5, E-mu Emulator), guitar, Little Italy mandolinos
- John Oates – lead vocals (7, 10), backing vocals, guitar, 12-string guitar, electric piano, CompuRhythm drums, Linn LM-1, Little Italy mandolinos
- Larry Fast – synthesizer programming
- G.E. Smith – lead guitars
- Tom "T-Bone" Wolk – bass, Little Italy mandolinos
- Mickey Curry – drums, percussion
- Charlie "Mr. Casual" DeChant – saxophone

=== Technical ===
- Produced by Daryl Hall, John Oates, and Neil Kernon
- Engineered by Neil Kernon
- Mixed by Hugh Padgham
- Assistant engineers – Bruce Buchhalter, Michael Somers-Abbott, Barry Harris
- Mastered by Bob Ludwig at Masterdisk (New York, NY)
- Art direction – Geoffrey Kent and Mick Haggerty
- Design – Mick Haggerty
- Cover photography – Hiro
- Inner sleeve photography – Larry Williams
- Equipment technician – Mike Klvana
- Management and direction – Tommy Mottola

== Charts ==
=== Weekly charts ===
Weekly chart performance for H_{2}O
Chart (1982–1983)	Peak position
Australian Albums (Kent Music Report)	3
Canada Top Albums/CDs (RPM)	1
Dutch Albums (Album Top 100)	30
German Albums (Offizielle Top 100)	32
New Zealand Albums (RMNZ)	3
Norwegian Albums (VG-lista)	19
Swedish Albums (Sverigetopplistan)	8
UK Albums (Official Charts)	24
US Billboard 200	3
US Rock Albums (Billboard)	19
US Top R&B/Hip-Hop Albums (Billboard)	8

=== Year-end charts ===
1982 year-end chart performance for H_{2}O
Chart (1982)	Position
Australian Albums (Kent Music Report)	84
Canada Top Albums/CDs (RPM)	70

1983 year-end chart performance for H_{2}O
Chart (1983)	Position
Australian Albums (Kent Music Report)	85
Canada Top Albums/CDs (RPM)	7
New Zealand Albums (RMNZ)	28
US Billboard 200	4

== Certifications ==
Certifications for H_{2}O
Region	Certification	Certified units/sales
Australia (ARIA)	Platinum	50,000^{^}
Canada (Music Canada)	3× Platinum	300,000^{^}
United Kingdom (BPI)	Gold	100,000^{^}
United States (RIAA)	2× Platinum	2,000,000^{^}
^{^} Shipments figures based on certification alone.
