= Five Miles Out (song) =

Single by Mike Oldfield

from the album Five Miles Out
- B-side: "Live Punkadiddle"
- Released: March 1982
- Recorded: Buckinghamshire, 1981–1982
- Genre: Progressive rock, electronic rock
- Length: 4:18
- Label: Virgin
- Songwriter: Mike Oldfield
- Producers: Mike Oldfield; Tom Newman

Mike Oldfield singles chronology
"The Singles" (1981)	"Five Miles Out" (1982)	"Family Man" (1982)

"Five Miles Out" is a single by musician Mike Oldfield, released in 1982 by Virgin Records. It is from the album Five Miles Out and predominantly features vocals by Maggie Reilly, but also includes vocals by Oldfield himself.

The B-side, a live version of "Punkadiddle", was recorded during Oldfield's European tour 1980.

== Song analysis ==
The song (and the music video) has an unusually complex structure for its length, and is mainly inspired by a near tragic airplane flight Oldfield was a passenger on, in which an inexperienced pilot flew a small craft directly into a violent storm. Having acquired a pilot licence afterwards, Oldfield here, among other things, makes an extensive use of air travel vocabulary to portray exchanges between a pilot in distress being caught in a storm, and a traffic controller. This is sung through a vocoder, representing radio communication, while Reilly's vocals are bare and lyrical, offering comfort and support. The song also quotes motifs from Tubular Bells, Taurus II (from the same album), and possibly others.

Music video for the song is more or less a literal, though simplified, representation of its lyrics. The video features Oldfield in several shots, though Maggie Reilly does not appear. It is available on the Elements – The Best of Mike Oldfield video.

Notably, Mike has said it was one of the first videos of his own he has noticed on TV, and that it might have helped spark his interest in experimenting with radio-friendly music, as he would with great success all through the 1980s.

== Track listing ==
1. "Five Miles Out" – 4:18
2. "Live Punkadiddle" – 5:35

The picture sleeve states that "Live Punkadiddle" was "recorded live at Essen in 1981 by the Mike Oldfield Group". This version was later released on CD2 of the Deluxe Edition of QE2, which featured tracks selected from Oldfield's European Adventure Tour.

== Personnel ==
- Mike Oldfield – vocals, vocoder, guitars, bass guitar, keyboards, percussion, Fairlight CMI
- Maggie Reilly – vocals
- Rick Fenn – guitar
- Tim Cross – keyboards
- Morris Pert – percussion, keyboards, string arrangement
- Mike Frye – percussion
- Graham Broad – drums
- Martyn Ford – conductor

== Charts ==
Charts (1982)	Peak position
Australia (Kent Music Report)	61
New Zealand (Recorded Music NZ)	44
UK Singles (OCC)	43
West Germany (GfK)	42
