= Crime of Passion (Mike Oldfield song) =

Single by Mike Oldfield
- B-side: "Jungle Gardenia"
- Released: 3 January 1984
- Genre: Pop rock
- Length: 4:08
- Label: Virgin
- Songwriter: Mike Oldfield
- Producer: Mike Oldfield

Mike Oldfield singles chronology
"Shadow on the Wall" (1983)	"Crime of Passion" (1984)	"To France" (1984)

"Crime of Passion" is a non-album single by musician Mike Oldfield, released in 1984 on Virgin Records. The song features Barry Palmer performing vocals.

== Single details ==
The front cover features a sepia photograph of Mike Oldfield's mother Maureen, who died in January 1974, ten years before the release of this single. The song was released between Oldfield's albums Crises and Discovery.

== Music video ==
The music video for "Crime of Passion" takes place in a surrealistic children's play room featuring books, giant letter blocks (some arranged to spell out the song’s title), a doll on a swing, a drumming soldier, and a clown. Oldfield performs in a 'mechanical' fashion with Ovation and Fender Stratocaster guitars, while Palmer sits on a block and sings. The video is available on the Elements – The Best of Mike Oldfield video.

== Track listing ==
=== 7-inch single ===
1. "Crime of Passion" – 3:37
2. "Jungle Gardenia" – 2:44

=== 12-inch single ===
1. "Crime of Passion" (Extended version) – 4:08
2. "Jungle Gardenia" – 2:44

== Charts ==
Chart (1984)	Peak position
Denmark	1
Greece	3
Ireland (IRMA)	22
Sweden (Sverigetopplistan)	10
Switzerland (Schweizer Hitparade)	17
UK Singles (Official Charts Company)	61
West Germany (GfK)	17
