= My Beautiful Dark Twisted Fantasy =

- Original artwork by George Condo. The central image is pixelated on censored versions of the cover, including the digital release.

Studio album by Kanye West
- Released: November 22, 2010
- Recorded: 2009–2010
- Studios: Avex Recording (Honolulu); Electric Lady and Platinum Sound (New York City); Glenwood Place (Burbank)
- Genres: Hip-hop; progressive rap; rap opera
- Length: 68:34
- Labels: Roc-A-Fella; Def Jam
- Producers: Bink; DJ Frank E; Kanye West; Mike Dean; No I.D.; RZA; S1

Kanye West chronology
VH1 Storytellers (2010)	My Beautiful Dark Twisted Fantasy (2010)	Watch the Throne (2011)

Alternate cover
- Physical release sold in retail stores.

Singles from My Beautiful Dark Twisted Fantasy
- 1. "Power" Released: July 1, 2010; 2. "Runaway" Released: October 4, 2010; 3. "Monster" Released: October 23, 2010; 4. "All of the Lights" Released: January 18, 2011

My Beautiful Dark Twisted Fantasy is the fifth studio album by the American rapper Kanye West. It was released by Def Jam Recordings and Roc-A-Fella Records on November 22, 2010. It was primarily produced by West, alongside Mike Dean, No I.D., Jeff Bhasker, RZA, Bink, and DJ Frank E. Guest appearances include Nicki Minaj, Rihanna, Jay-Z, Pusha T, Rick Ross, Kid Cudi, John Legend, Bon Iver, Raekwon, and Elton John.

Retreating to a self-imposed exile in Hawaii after a period of controversy in 2009 following his interruption of Taylor Swift at the MTV Video Music Awards, West recorded at Honolulu's Avex Recording Studio in a communal environment with numerous musicians. Additional recording took place at Glenwood Place Studios in Burbank, California, and Electric Lady and Platinum Sound in New York City. Critics noted the maximalist aesthetic and opulent production with elements from West's previous work, including soul, pop, baroque, electro, and symphonic, with progressive rock influences. Lyrically, it explores West's celebrity status, consumer culture, self-aggrandizement, and the idealism of the American Dream.

Alongside several free songs released through the weekly GOOD Fridays series, West supported My Beautiful Dark Twisted Fantasy with four US Billboard Hot 100 top-40 singles, "Power", "Runaway", "Monster", and "All of the Lights". West also released an accompanying musical short film, Runaway (2010). My Beautiful Dark Twisted Fantasy received acclaim from critics, who considered it a return to form for West and praised the maximalist approach, production, themes, and variety. Many publications listed it as the best album of 2010, and it won Best Rap Album at the 54th Annual Grammy Awards and CD of the Year at the 2011 BET Hip Hop Awards.

My Beautiful Dark Twisted Fantasy debuted at number one on the US Billboard 200 and the Canadian Albums Chart, while reaching the top 10 in six other countries. It was certified quintuple platinum in the United States, and received sales certifications in a few other territories. In retrospect, My Beautiful Dark Twisted Fantasy has been regarded as West's magnum opus; several publications, including Pitchfork and Rolling Stone, have ranked it as the best album of the 2010s and among the greatest of all time.

== Background ==
Dark Fantasy was my long, backhanded apology. You know how people give a backhanded compliment? It was a backhanded apology. It was like, all these raps, all these sonic acrobatics. I was like: "Let me show you guys what I can do, and please accept me back. You want to have me on your shelves."

— Kanye West, speaking to The New York Times in 2013

My Beautiful Dark Twisted Fantasy evolved from Good Ass Job, which Kanye West had planned as the conclusion of a college-themed tetralogy that began with The College Dropout (2004). He adhered to the plan with Late Registration (2005) and Graduation (2007), but after the death of his mother Donda West and his breakup with his fiancée Alexis Phifer, he pivoted to the electropop project 808s & Heartbreak (2008). While industry publications and collaborators reported that West would follow 808s & Heartbreak with Good Ass Job, in private, West had lost interest in continuing the plan. He explained to MTV News in October 2010 that he "didn't want to... have to stick to the skits" and other conventions of his previous albums.

West conceived My Beautiful Dark Twisted Fantasy at Avex Recording Studio during his self-imposed exile in Oahu, Hawaii, in 2009, following a period of public-image controversy. West said that fatigue from overworking led to his controversial outburst at the 2009 MTV Video Music Awards (VMAs) when the singer Taylor Swift was awarded Best Female Video at the ceremony. West then went on stage, stole the mic from Swift who was 19 at the time, and said "Yo Taylor, I'm really happy for you, I'ma let you finish, but, Beyoncé had one of the best videos of all time! One of the best videos of all time!" West then shrugged and gave the mic back to Swift. He was disgusted with the media response, which led to a brief hiatus from recording. He observed at the time of My Beautiful Dark Twisted Fantasy's release that Swift never defended him in any interviews, saying she continuously "rode the waves" from the controversy. West had held recording sessions at the same studio as 808s & Heartbreak.

In response to the backlash, West's scheduled tour Fame Kills: Starring Kanye West and Lady Gaga with the singer Lady Gaga to promote 808s & Heartbreak was cancelled on October 1, 2009. In 2010, he explained to Ellen DeGeneres the incident served as motivation for his works because he felt like "a soldier of culture", realizing no one wants this to be his role and admitted he will continuously "feel convicted about things that really meant stuff to culture that constantly get denied for years". In 2013, West said that My Beautiful Dark Twisted Fantasy served as a backhanded apology after his VMAs outburst, detailing that he used the music to become accepted again. He elaborated that a minimum of 80 percent was genuine, with the remainder "fulfilling a perception" for the public. West insisted that he was not criticizing My Beautiful Dark Twisted Fantasy and instead failed to reach satisfaction, then openly revealed his idea of the truth.

== Recording and production ==
My Beautiful Dark Twisted Fantasy was recorded at Avex in Honolulu, Hawaii. Additional recording took place at Glenwood Place Studios in Burbank, California, and at Electric Lady Studios and Platinum Sound Recording Studios in New York City. It was reported that West spent around $3 million provided by his record label Def Jam to record the album, making it one of the most expensive albums ever made. He explained the initial recording process to Noah Callahan-Bever, the editor-in-chief of Complex and West's then-confidant, telling him he had resided in Hawaii accompanied by his favorite producers and artists to work on My Beautiful Dark Twisted Fantasy and provide inspiration. Various contributors engaged in sessions with West for the album, including Kid Cudi, Elton John, Rick Ross, Pusha T, and Justin Vernon. Vocals were also recorded by M.I.A., Mos Def, Santigold, and Seal. Producers who contributed in the sessions included Q-Tip, RZA, Pete Rock, Madlib, Statik Selektah, and DJ Premier. Madlib said he made five beats for My Beautiful Dark Twisted Fantasy, while DJ Premier revealed his work did not make the final cut.

West block-booked the three session rooms of Avex simultaneously for 24 hours a day to work on My Beautiful Dark Twisted Fantasy, until he felt it was complete. According to Callahan-Bever, when West "hits a creative wall", he changes to another studio room to work on a different song. Sheets of paper were posted on one side of the studio with what were known as "Kanye Commandments", such as "No Tweeting" and "No Pictures". West never slept a full night there, opting instead to take power naps on a studio chair or couch in 90-minute intervals when working during the night. Engineers worked a similar schedule, remaining active 24 hours a day. The heavy work ethic led to West and his crew having multi-course breakfasts each morning at his Diamond Head residence, cooked by in-house chefs. Later in the mornings after breakfast, West and most of the crew played games of 21 against locals at the Honolulu YMCA for leisure. Kid Cudi smoked marijuana in preparation and worked out on a treadmill, while RZA exercised in the weight room.

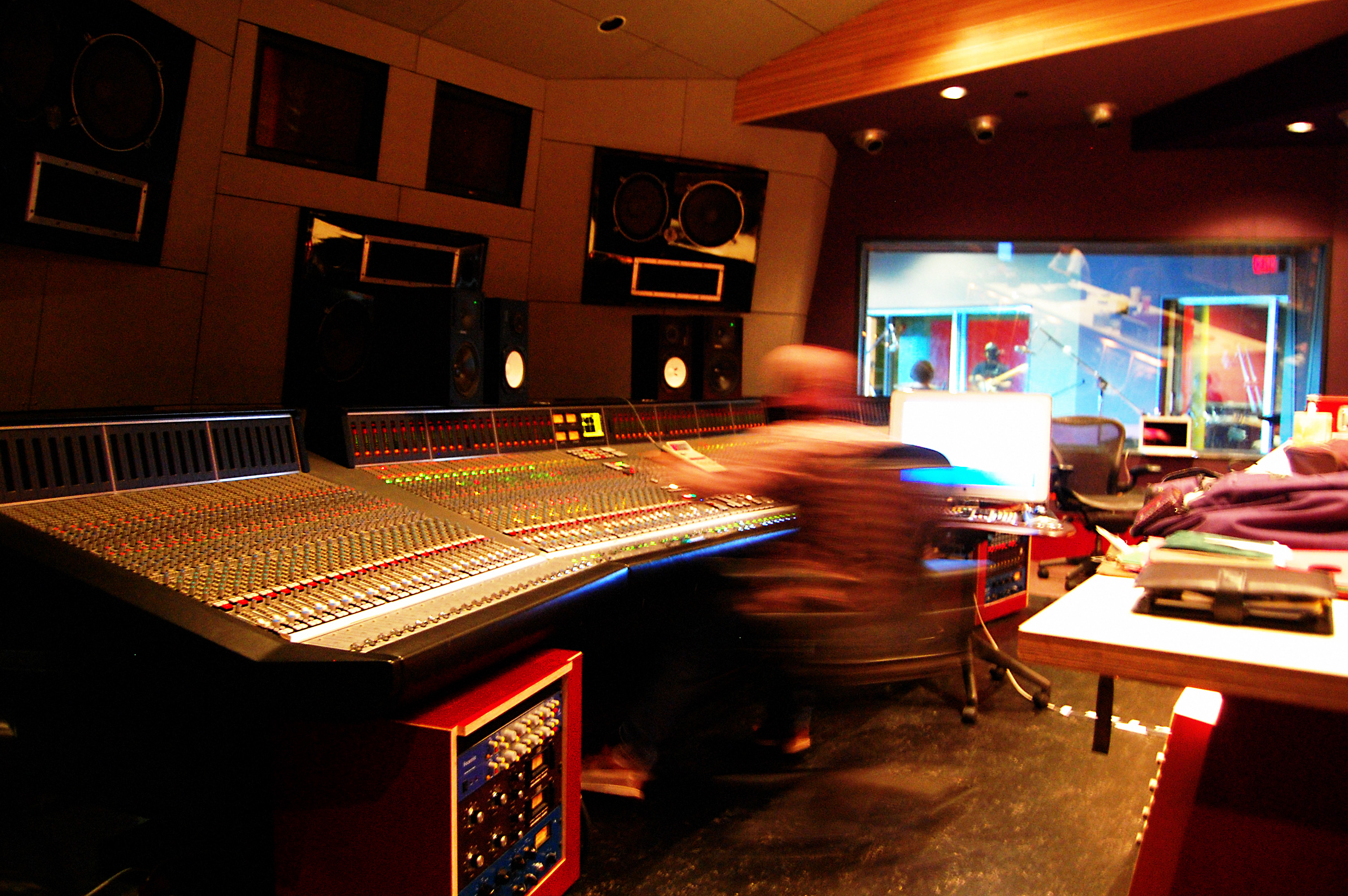

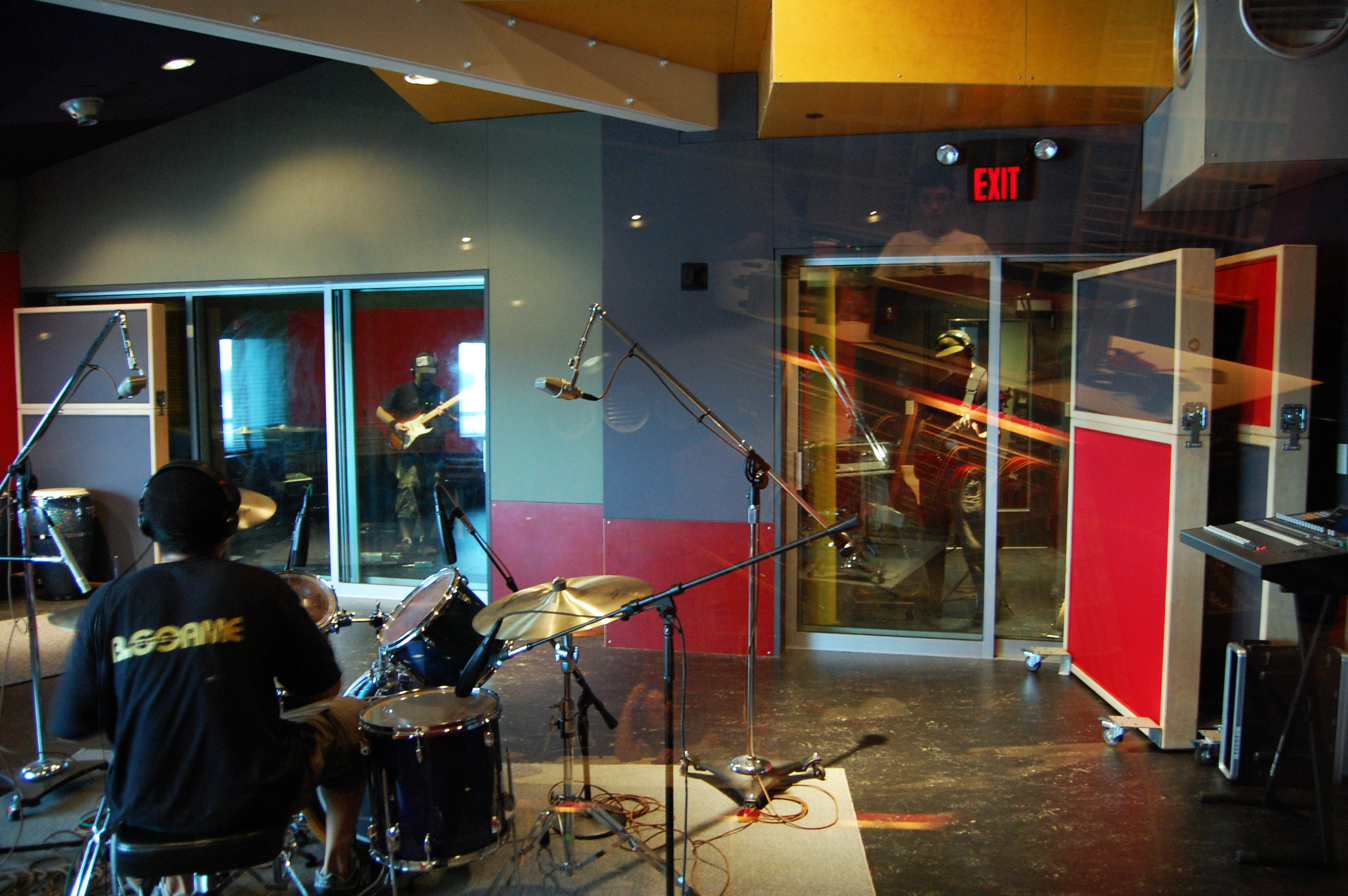
Control room (top) and tracking room (bottom) of Avex Recording Studio in Honolulu, where the album was recorded

Throughout the album's development, West enlisted other producers and musicians for opinions. At the studio, they went through various conversations and contributions. Observing these discussions during a visit, Callahan-Bever noted that despite the presence of prominent musicians, "the egos rarely clash; talks are sprawling, enlightening, and productive" around the future, present, and past. Q-Tip described the process as "music by committee" and elaborated on its significance to the sessions and West's work ethic:

He'll go, 'Check this out, tell me what you think.' Which speaks volumes about who he is and how he sees and views people. Every person has a voice and an idea, so he's sincerely looking to hear what you have to say—good, bad, or whatever ... When he has his beats or his rhymes, he offers them to the committee and we're all invited to dissect, strip, or add on to what he's already started. By the end of the sessions, you see how he integrates and transforms everyone's contributions, so the whole is greater than the sum of its parts. He's a real wizard at it. What he does is alchemy, really.

The rapper Pusha T characterized My Beautiful Dark Twisted Fantasy as "a collage of sounds" and found West's recording methods unorthodox. He explained that when the team thought they were focused on a song, West would hear the work of a record producer such as Jeff Bhasker and his attention would be captured as he went through "his mental Rolodex" to the most suitable point for it on the album. Expressing a similar sentiment, the rapper Malik Yusef said that he was mocked for his vision of incorporating collaborators from genres outside hip-hop like John. DJ Premier recalled that West insisted to him during the production for no electro, describing him as "that crazy dude he's always been" and pointing out his focus on the album's rawness.

West ensured that the recording sessions were secretive, placing paper sheets in the studio reading "no tweeting, no talking, no e-mailing", and also prohibiting speaking with people outside of the location. Pusha T recalled West's attitude in an interview for Rolling Stone, saying that following a leak he remembered his strictness, "Fuck this! We're not going to ever work there again!" In October 2010, West tweeted that the recording of My Beautiful Dark Twisted Fantasy had been finished.

== Musical style ==
The music was described as maximalist hip-hop by numerous publications, incorporating East Coast rap, boom bap, R&B ballads, electronic music, and progressive rock samples. Various writers also noticed elements from West's previous four albums. (Note: Elements were noted by the likes of Julius Bailey, Andy Kellman of AllMusic, Simon Vozick-Levinson of Entertainment Weekly, and Ryan Dombal of Pitchfork.) The Village Voice's Sean Fennessey thought that West had adopted the skills of his collaborators from the five years before My Beautiful Dark Twisted Fantasy, which he sometimes uses to an increased level. West incorporates lush soul from The College Dropout, orchestration from Late Registration, a rich atmosphere from Graduation, and emotionally tired electro from 808s & Heartbreak. Pitchfork's Ryan Dombal and AllMusic's Andy Kellman wrote My Beautiful Dark Twisted Fantasy seamlessly combines elements from West's earlier albums; Kellman felt that "All of the Lights" denotes its varied elements and "maniacal extravagance". David Amidon of PopMatters observed the pop sound of Graduation and 808s & Heartbreak.

My Beautiful Dark Twisted Fantasy was described as a progressive rap record by Carl Williott of Idolator and Rolling Stone's Christopher R. Weingarten, with the latter noting that it came at the time of lower album budgets. The album draws elements from varied genres like progressive rock, soul, and old-school rap, moving towards a new sound. My Beautiful Dark Twisted Fantasy follows a dense, wide scope of styles; Al Horner from NME called it a rap opera. The author Kirk Walker Graves thinks West became a collagist, who makes a bold and vulnerable work of art from "scattered pop shards and indelible beats".

== Lyrics and themes ==
West's lyrics explore themes of excess, celebrity, grandiosity, self-aggrandizement, self-doubt, romance, escapism, decadence, and sex. My Beautiful Dark Twisted Fantasy also openly acknowledges alcohol and drug usage more than West's previous albums. West places an introspective focus on fame, detailing the perks of power that he links to neoliberalism. He addresses deep personal insecurities, although philosopher Julius Bailey writes that he embraced his narcissism in contrast to the chipmunk soul on The College Dropout. West displays varied emotions, which range from lows to highs of his mental state. He conveys feelings of despair with his public image since 808s & Heartbreak, depicting his out-of-control world. According to author Bernadette Marie Calafell, West used My Beautiful Dark Twisted Fantasy to celebrate monstrosity after his troubled year.

West ventures into the id of his own ego on My Beautiful Dark Twisted Fantasy, showing his perspective as a celebrity. He poses a risk of self-destruction with the id, while perusing any goal or girl he can and driven by the buzz of consumer culture, despite ultimately being unsatisfied. Ann Powers of the Los Angeles Times depicted the songs as "pornographic boasts, romantic disaster stories, devil-haunted dark nights of the soul" and perceived West as not welcome nor sure about the purpose of his presence due to the discussion of race. Powers felt that rather than an issue for West, it is the inherent curse of author Michael Eric Dyson's theory of "the exceptional black man" whose talents are welcomed, but he is excluded for his skin color. According to Rolling Stone's Rob Sheffield, the album serves as "a rock-star manifesto" in a world where expectations have generally lowered.

== Songs ==
=== Tracks 1–7 ===
"Dark Fantasy"
"Dark Fantasy" showcases orchestration that The Village Voice's Sean Fennessey thought West learnt from working with Jon Brion on Late Registration (2005), and begins the album's decadent, hedonistic themes.

The album begins with "Dark Fantasy", opened by rapper Nicki Minaj narrating a rework of Roald Dahl's 1982 poem Cinderella, followed by a chorus including Auto-Tuned "oohs" and "ah-ah-ah-aahs", as well as backing accents. The song introduces the themes of decadence and hedonism, with West musing how it had been planned to drink to release pain, "But what's worse, the pain or the hangover?" The track's lyrics contain musical and popular culture references, including fellow rapper Nas, the 1820 short story "The Legend of Sleepy Hollow", British singer Leona Lewis, and the song "Sex on Fire" by Tennessee rock band Kings of Leon. "Gorgeous" is an uplifting blues-styled track, relying on a guitar riff juxtaposed with melodic piano. The track is seen by Graves as West's "scattershot mission statement" and it sees him tackling racial injustices, including comparing himself to black rights activist Malcolm X with the title "Malcolm West". "Power" features a dark production that relies on a sample of King Crimson's "21st Century Schizoid Man" (1969), which Fennessey found to be "apocalyptic" and it is accompanied by chants loosely resembling a choir. West delves into escapism on the song, mentioning his struggles with the public and narrating his vision of a career suicide.

"All of the Lights" incorporates drum 'n' bass breaks, energetic percussion, and horn instruments. The opening lines mention the death of Michael Jackson and present the narrative of a man who goes through multiple issues including abusing his lover and serving prison time. West enlisted 11 guest vocalists for the song, including Alicia Keys, John Legend, Tony Williams, and Elly Jackson; Rihanna sings the hook. In an interview with MTV, Jackson said that West designated her to layer up the vocal arrangement with other people as he simply used his favorite vocalists worldwide "to create this really unique vocal texture on his record, but it's not the kind of thing where you can pick it out". "Monster" is a posse cut, which features staccato strings that invoke paranoia and it was described by Calafell as addressing critics through exploration of their "monstrous construction" of West. West raps about using inappropriate methods to drown his pain and Nicki Minaj asserts her queen status on the song. The fellow posse cut "So Appalled" is built around piano and strings, with the performers delivering their odes to success and affirming that "this shit is/fucking ridiculous".

=== Tracks 8–13 ===
"Devil in a New Dress"
"Devil in a New Dress" utilizes West's characteristic style of altering the pitch and tempo from classic soul records with a sample of Smokey Robinson's 1960 song "Will You Love Me Tomorrow", though the production was instead handled by Bink. Andy Kellman of AllMusic called the song "a throwback soul production" that invokes West's early work, while The New York Times' Jon Caramanica saw it as resembling "the slowed-down soul" of The College Dropout (2004).

"Devil in a New Dress" is built on a sample of Smokey Robinson's "Will You Love Me Tomorrow" (1960). The lyrics range from self-criticism to warning and lust to heartache, with its sexual and religious imagery described by one critic as "part bedroom allure, part angelic prayer". The song is the only track without production by West, yet features his characteristic style of manipulating the pitch and tempo of classic soul samples. "Runaway" contains a piano-based motif comprising a series of uninterrupted descending half and whole notes, with a coda that incorporates cello at first, before a violin section and West's vocoder-singing, which is distortion that covers the final three minutes. West uses the song's lyrics to address public opinion and his character issues, proclaiming a toast to all with those flaws. Fennessey cited "Runaway" as the point in My Beautiful Dark Twisted Fantasy where "self-laceration overtakes chest-beating", while Graves is taken aback by how the song contains all of its contradictions; "self-mythologizing, rife with hubris, [and] assertively 'artistic' to the point of unintentional parody".

Inspired by West's two-year relationship with model Amber Rose, "Hell of a Life" samples the Mojo Men's "She's My Baby" (1966) and follows a narrative of marrying a porn star that Graves calls "pornographic anxiety". According to Dombal, the song "attempts to bend its central credo—'no more drugs for me, pussy and religion is all I need'—into a noble pursuit". He wrote that it crosses the lines of "fantasy and reality, sex and romance, love and religion, until no lines exist at all". "Blame Game" is a low-key track that is built around a sample of Richard D. James's piano composition "Avril 14th" (2001), and features additional vocals from Legend. The song focuses on a painful domestic dispute where West and a woman go back and forth aggressively, and contains a profane skit by comedian Chris Rock.

"Lost in the World" features tribal drums and prominent samples from the indie folk band Bon Iver's "Woods" (2009), with West applying the sample "as the centerpiece of a catchy, communal reverie". West enthusiastically told Bon Iver frontman Justin Vernon when listening to the song, "Fuck, this is going to be the festival closer." It features several musical changes, beginning with Vernon's faint vocals, followed by 4/4 drums, a gospel chorus, and increased tempo, and a final measured tempo. "Lost in the World" transitions into the closing track "Who Will Survive in America". It serves as the album's coda and samples jazz poet Gil Scott-Heron's "Comment No. 1" (1970), a surrealist piece delivered by him in spoken word about the African American experience and the fated idealism of the American dream. Scott-Heron's original speech is edited to an excerpt that, according to Kot, "retains its essence, that of an African-American male" feeling isolated from the US and his culture. By contrast, Fennessey wrote that the seriousness of the denouement does not suit "an album that is more about the self's little nightmares than some aching societal rejection".

== Title and packaging ==
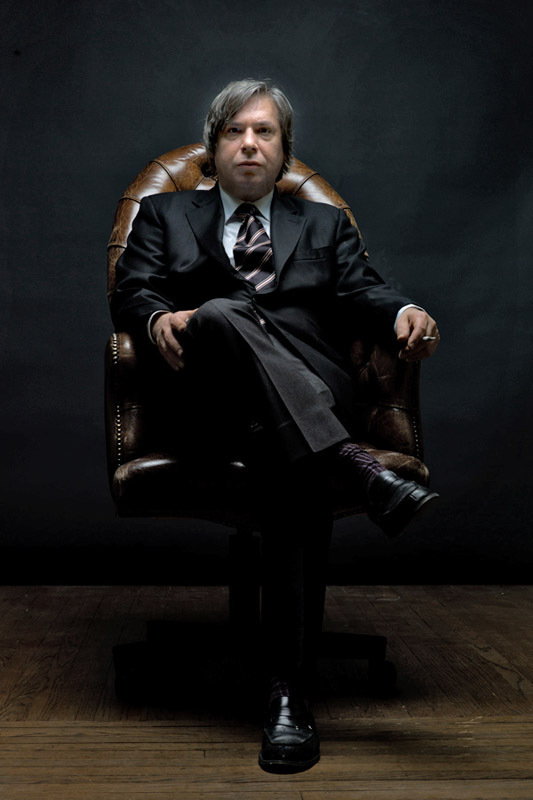
The artist George Condo designed the artwork.

Good Ass Job remained My Beautiful Dark Twisted Fantasy's provisional title until July 28, 2010, when West announced on his newly registered Twitter account that it had been scrapped and he had been considering "a couple of titles". Music journalists reported that Dark Twisted Fantasy was among the titles under consideration. West expressed uncertainty about the title in September, tweeting: "I can't decide on my album title [...] uuuugh!!!!" He announced the final title, My Beautiful Dark Twisted Fantasy, on October 5, 2010.

The album's artwork, designed by George Condo, shows West being straddled on a couch by an armless winged female, who has fearsome features and a long, spotted tail. Both are nude, with West shown holding a beer. Bailey sees Condo's style for the cover as pop surrealist and Cubist and portraying "various aspects of West's album themes". He also asserts that its royal red colour is "symbolic of passion, love, anger, and, of course, blood", marked by the starkness. According to Vulture writer Dan Kois, the mythological figure straddling West is "a kind of fragment, between a sphinx, a phoenix, a haunting ghost, a harpy". The artwork was done at Condo's studio, after West visited for several hours and they listened to tapes of his music. Over the next few days, the painter designed eight or nine paintings for the album. Two of them were portraits of West: an extreme closeup, with mismatched eyes and four sets of teeth; a portrait showing his head, crowned and decapitated, placed sideways on a white slab, pierced by a sword. Condo also did a painting of a dyspeptic ballerina in a black tutu and one of the crown alongside the sword in a grassy landscape. He made five covers in total, which were all included with the purchase of My Beautiful Dark Twisted Fantasy. A second cover that contains a painting of a ballerina was posted on the Amazon.com pre-order page. The image was originally intended to be the cover art for "Runaway", but West used a photograph of a ballerina instead. Another painting, The Priest, was completed for the album by Condo, who described it as an attempt to bring depictions of religious figures into the modern world.

West told Condo that he wanted a phoenix painting. After Condo produced with the artwork, West expressed his admiration for how they both "express ourselves with our truest vision". According to Condo, West requested the original cover image to be provocative enough to be banned by retailers, as a publicity stunt. In October 2010, a month before the album's release, West tweeted: "Yoooo they banned my album cover!!!!! Banned in the USA!!! They don't want me chilling on the couch with my Phoenix!" He also suggested Walmart had rejected the cover and cited the case of rock band Nirvana's 1991 album Nevermind, which featured a photo of a naked baby. West questioned why the band are allowed to have someone nude on their cover, but he "can't have a PAINTING of a monster with no arms and a polka dot tail and wings". In response, Walmart denied the suggestion in a statement declaring the company's excitement about My Beautiful Dark Twisted Fantasy and its arrival in stores. Certain retailers did not carry the original cover, with West substituting it with Condo's ballerina artwork, while some shipped copies used a pixelated version of the original.

In 2015, Billboard named the album's artwork as the 30th best of all time. The magazine wrote that West "matched the widescreen brilliance of the album's music with boundary-cracking art", including a demonic image of him "being straddled by a nude angel". In 2017, NME listed the cover as the seventh best album artwork of the 21st century so far.

== Marketing ==
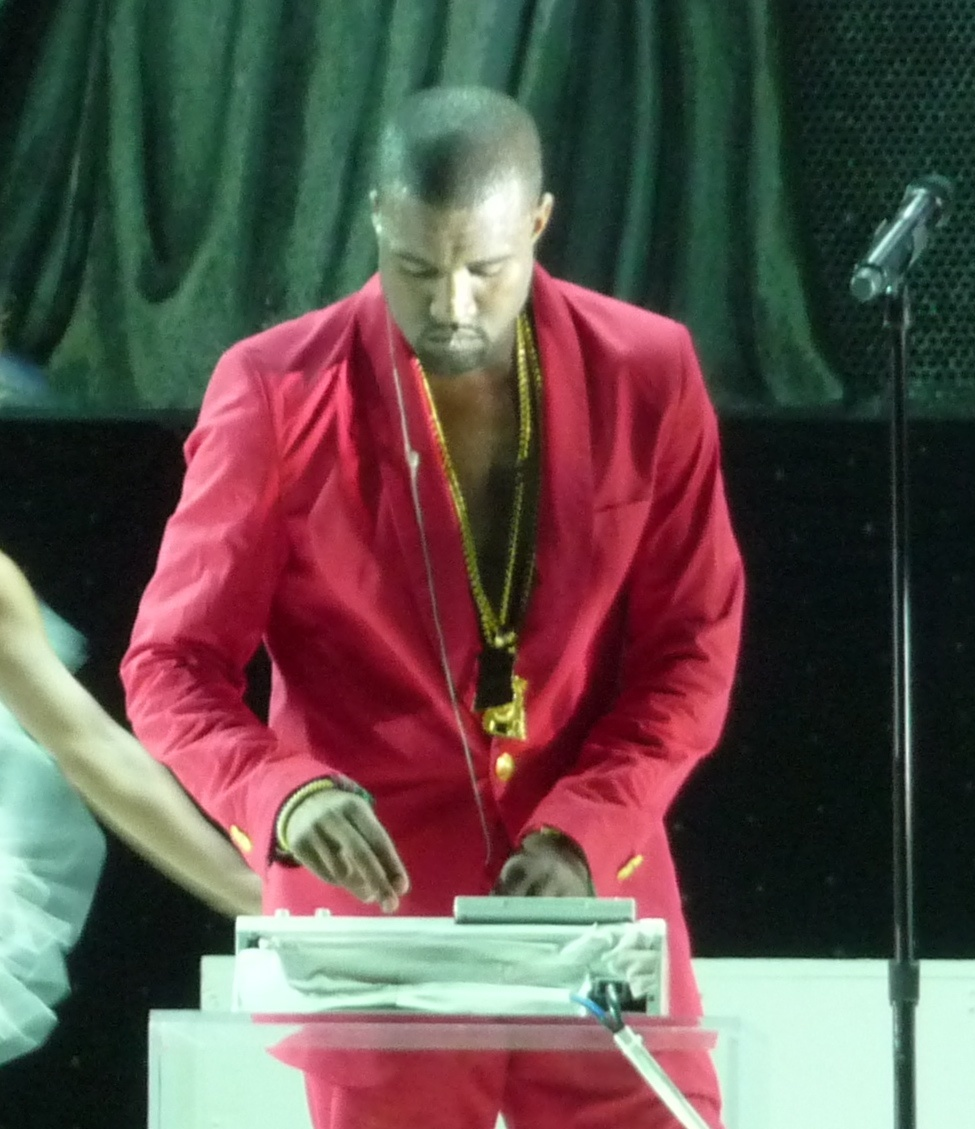
West performing his headlining set at the Coachella Valley Music and Arts Festival in 2011

Before the release of My Beautiful Dark Twisted Fantasy, West initiated the music program GOOD Fridays through his website beginning August 20, 2010, offering a free download of a new song for each Friday. West tweeted that he was aware his fans needed new music, "so I'm dropping 1 new song every weekend until Xmas" and he explained a release could be a song by him, Jay-Z, or another artist. Titled after his imprint label GOOD Music, the program generated considerable publicity ahead of the release of My Beautiful Dark Twisted Fantasy. Young Money Entertainment online marketing coordinator Karen Civil retrospectively called the program genius, detailing that West undertook a program not previously attempted and "at a point when he was the most hated person in music, he brought excitement back with his Friday releases". GOOD Fridays was intended to run until December 2010, but West extended it through to January 2011.

On September 12, 2010, West premiered "Runaway" with a live performance at the 2010 MTV Video Music Awards. Three weeks later, on October 2, he performed the song a second time on Saturday Night Live, along with "Power". On October 4, 2010, West announced the album's release date of November 22, after he had previously tweeted that he was "contemplating my album date". He also announced that certain songs from GOOD Fridays would be included on it. My Beautiful Dark Twisted Fantasy was released by Def Jam and Roc-A-Fella on November 22, 2010, being made available for digital download on Amazon at a list price of $3.99. The deal was only offered by Amazon, while the album was simultaneously made available on iTunes and West's website linked to this release. Four singles were released from it and all reached the top 40 of the US Billboard Hot 100, with the lead single "Power" released on July 1, 2010, charting at number 22. "Runaway" was released on October 4, and reached number 12, while "Monster" and "All of the Lights" were released on October 23, 2010, and January 18, 2011, respectively; they both charted at number 18.

A 35-minute film entitled Runaway, featuring the titular song's official music video, was directed by West and released on October 23, 2010. Filmed in Prague over a period of four days in the summer of 2010, the film stars West and model Selita Ebanks, with the script penned by Hype Williams and the story written by West. West described the video as an overall representation of his dreams and a reflection of feelings throughout his life, including a parallel of the situation from 2009 to 2010. He explained that it is "the story of a phoenix fallen to Earth", whom he makes his girlfriend, though she faces discrimination and eventually "has to burn herself alive and go back to her world". West elaborated how he had been deeply considering the idea of a phoenix for a while and this could be parallel to his career that he "threw a Molotov cocktail" at in 2009, then felt the need to make a comeback "as a better person". At a Runaway screening in Paris, he broke down into tears. After another screening in Los Angeles, West said that the affect his music and art has on people people inspires him to continue in his career. The film was included on a bonus DVD for the deluxe edition of My Beautiful Dark Twisted Fantasy.

For initial promotion of My Beautiful Dark Twisted Fantasy, West performed at Macy's Thanksgiving Day Parade in late November 2010. Following the release of the album, West performed headlining sets at several large festivals in 2011, including SXSW, Lollapalooza, Austin City Limits, and Coachella; the latter was viewed by The Hollywood Reporter as "one of the great hip-hop sets of all time".

== Commercial performance ==
In its first week of release, My Beautiful Dark Twisted Fantasy debuted at number one on the US Billboard 200, selling 496,000 copies. The entry blocked Nicki Minaj's debut album Pink Friday from the top spot with 375,000 sales; the week marked the first time in two years that the chart had two albums bow with over 300,000 units. It also gave West his fourth consecutive US number-one album and surpassed the 450,000 first-week sales of 808s & Heartbreak, with the debut becoming the fourth-best sales week of 2010. The album's first-week digital sales of 224,000 units accounted for 45% of the total and stood as the fourth-highest digital copies for an album in a week.

In its second week on the Billboard 200, My Beautiful Dark Twisted Fantasy descended six places to number seven with 108,000 copies sold, marking a 78% sales decline, while remaining above Pink Friday by one place. As of July 2013, it had sold 1,300,000 copies in the United States, as reported by Nielsen SoundScan. By June 2011, the album had sold 483,000 digital copies, ranking as the second best-selling digital rap album ever. On July 17 2026, My Beautiful Dark Twisted Fantasy was certified quintuple platinum by the Recording Industry Association of America for pushing 5,000,000 certified units in the US. According to Billboard, as of 2022, My Beautiful Dark Twisted Fantasy is one of the 15 best-performing 21st-century albums without any of its singles being chart-toppers on the Hot 100.

My Beautiful Dark Twisted Fantasy became West's fourth number one album on the Canadian Albums Chart. It reached number four on the Danish Albums chart, and in March 2021, was certified double platinum by IFPI Danmark for shipments of 40,000. My Beautiful Dark Twisted Fantasy opened at number six on the ARIA Albums chart and on September 10, 2021, it was awarded a double platinum certification from the Australian Recording Industry Association for over 140,000 copies shipped in Australia. The album charted within the top 10 in Norway, South Korea, New Zealand, and Switzerland. On February 20, 2026, it received a double platinum certification from the British Phonographic Industry for selling 600,000 units in the United Kingdom. By 2018, My Beautiful Dark Twisted Fantasy had registered a billion streams on Spotify.

== Critical reception ==
My Beautiful Dark Twisted Fantasy ratings
Aggregate scores
Source	Rating
AnyDecentMusic?	8.8/10
Metacritic	94/100
Review scores
Source	Rating
AllMusic	4.5/5 stars
Entertainment Weekly	A
The Guardian	4/5 stars
The Independent	5/5 stars
MSN Music (Expert Witness)	A
NME	9/10
Pitchfork	10/10
Rolling Stone	5/5 stars
Spin	9/10
USA Today	4/4 stars

My Beautiful Dark Twisted Fantasy was met with widespread critical acclaim. According to the review aggregator Metacritic, My Beautiful Dark Twisted Fantasy received "universal acclaim" based on a weighted average score of 94 out of 100 from 45 critic scores. The aggregator AnyDecentMusic? gave it 8.8 out of 10, based on their assessment of the critical consensus.

Numerous reviewers highlighted West's move towards maximalism. Andy Gill of The Independent praised the album as "one of pop's gaudiest, most grandiose efforts of recent years, a no holds-barred musical extravaganza" that forgoes the concept of good taste from the beginning. Powers, writing for the Los Angeles Times, found West's artistry comparable to Pablo Picasso, reaching "the Cubist mandate of rearranging form, texture, color and space" for suggesting newer viewpoints. The album was called a work of art and West's most lavish record in a review by Time magazine's David Browne, who said it proved again that few other artists shared his ability to adeptly mix diverse elements. Steve Jones of USA Today was impressed by West's display "of sonic flavors — old school hip-hop, progressive rock, R&B, classical music" for how he combines and matches these genres, concluding his only predictability is a consistent drive to make every project his best.

Critics often looked at the album as being among West's best work. Rolling Stone's Sheffield said My Beautiful Dark Twisted Fantasy marked West's best and most wildly inspired album, asserting that no other act was recording music as dark or maximalist; he added that he transgresses the conventions he had established himself for rap and pop music in the past five years. James Reed of The Boston Globe said that the album is "seamlessly his personal best" as West becomes self-involved in the varied styles and universal themes, standing as the most original hip-hop record of 2010, through his efforts to push the genre's boundaries. Christgau, in MSN Music, hailed it as a "world-beating return to form" for West. Michael Denslow of Consequence wrote that My Beautiful Dark Twisted Fantasy features "nine-minute rap epics" which break the traditional verse–chorus form and West manages to convey an attempt at the greatest album of all time, executing this well using "all the swagger and hype with an album that may actually be that good". The Village Voice's Sean Fennessey observed that while the album cannot be perfect as listeners "will reach to call [it]", West's point from the album is imperfection. He also noted the skillful engineering and sequencing, through the way each song transitions over like "some long night out into the hazy morning after". Pitchfork awarded the album a 10/10, the first perfect score the publication had given to a new release since Wilco's Yankee Hotel Foxtrot in 2002. Dombal from the publication highlighted West's "blast of surreal pop excess" that the majority of artists would not even try to create.

A few reviewers were more qualified in their praise, mostly focusing on West's rapping. For The Guardian, Kitty Empire was critical of his lyrics calling women "ruthless money-grabbers" on an otherwise "herculean [...] flawed near-masterpiece". AllMusic writer Andy Kellman found West's rapping inconsistent on "a deeply fascinating accomplishment" in his catalogue and one of complicated merit that is "as fatiguing as it is invigorating, as cold-blooded as it is heart-rending, as haphazardly splattered as it is meticulously sculpted", and maintains complexity across 70 minutes. David Amidon from PopMatters called the album one of hip-hop's "most bloated, egotistical, fantastical, flat-out amazing release[s]" for a while.

=== Rankings ===
Numerous critics and publications included My Beautiful Dark Twisted Fantasy on their year-end top albums lists. Many named it the best album of 2010, including Billboard, Time, Slant Magazine, Pitchfork, Rolling Stone, and Spin. My Beautiful Dark Twisted Fantasy was voted best album in The Village Voice's Pazz & Jop critics' poll for 2010, winning by the largest margin in the poll's history with 3,250 points. "Power", "Runaway", and "Monster" were voted in the top-10 of the Pazz & Jop singles list. Metacritic, which collates reviews of music albums, identified it as the best-reviewed album of 2010. The album stood as the first rap release to achieve this since Outkast's 2000 album Stankonia and the sixth-highest ranking of albums released in the 2010s to have at least 15 professional reviews.

My Beautiful Dark Twisted Fantasy appeared on decade-end best albums lists. In 2012, Complex included it on their list of "25 Rap Albums From the Past Decade That Deserve Classic Status". In October 2013, the magazine ranked the album as the best hip-hop album of the last five years. In 2014, Pitchfork named it the best album of the 2010s so far, with Ian Cohen writing, "West broke the ground upon which the new decade's most brilliant architects built their masterworks; Bon Iver, Take Care, Channel Orange, and Good Kid, M.A.A.D City don't exist without the blueprint of My Beautiful Dark Twisted Fantasy." It was later ranked as the top album of the 2010s by The A.V. Club, Billboard, and Rolling Stone. Christgau named My Beautiful Dark Twisted Fantasy as the decade's eighth-best album, saying it remains "perversely superb".

In 2014, Spin named My Beautiful Dark Twisted Fantasy as the eighth best album of the past 30 years, with Dan Weiss noting it is a world combining samples, interpolations, and vocalists; he expressed that West does not believe "one man should have all that power" of God, yet he "lives one hell of a life". Six years later, Marc Hogan from Pitchfork considered it among the great art pop albums of the last 20 years to "have filled the void of full-length statements with both artistic seriousness and mass appeal that was formerly largely occupied by [rock] guitar bands". In 2017, the staff of HipHopDX wrote the album is "widely considered [West's] magnum opus" and the release that made the public's perception of him positive again. EW picked My Beautiful Dark Twisted Fantasy as the eighth greatest album of all time in 2016, while it was ranked 21st and 17th on the lists by NME and Rolling Stone in 2013 and 2020, respectively. The album was also included in the book 1001 Albums You Must Hear Before You Die.

Select rankings of My Beautiful Dark Twisted Fantasy
Publication	List	Year	Rank	Ref.
The A.V. Club	The Best Music of 2010	2010	1	
The A.V. Club	50 Favorite Albums of the 2010s	2019	1	
Billboard	Top 10 Albums of 2010	2010	1	
Billboard	The 25 Best Albums of 2010	2010	1	
Billboard	100 Best Albums of the 2010s	2019	1	
Entertainment Weekly	10 Best Albums of 2010	2010	1	
Entertainment Weekly	Greatest Albums of all Time	2016	8	
The Guardian	The 100 Best Albums of the 21st Century	2019	3	
Metacritic	The Best Albums of 2010	2011	1	
Metacritic	The Best Albums of the Decade (2010–2019)	2019	6	
NME	50 Best Albums of 2010	2010	34	
NME	The 500 Greatest Albums of All Time	2013	21	
Pitchfork	The Top 50 Albums of 2010	2010	1	
Pitchfork	The 200 Best Albums of the 2010s	2019	2	
Rolling Stone	Best Albums of 2010	2010	1	
Rolling Stone	500 Greatest Albums of All Time	2012	353	
Rolling Stone	100 Best Albums of the 2010s	2019	1	
Rolling Stone	500 Greatest Albums of All Time	2020	17	
Rolling Stone	The 200 Greatest Hip-Hop Albums of All Time	2022	6	
Rolling Stone	The 250 Greatest Albums of the 21st Century So Far	2025	8	
Spin	The 300 Best Albums of the Past 30 Years (1985–2014)	2015	8	
The Village Voice	Pazz & Jop critics' poll of 2010	2010	1	

== Industry awards ==
My Beautiful Dark Twisted Fantasy won awards for both Album of the Year and Reader's Choice: Best Album at the 2010 HipHopDX Awards, receiving over 50 percent of the vote for the latter. The album was awarded CD of the Year at the next year's BET Hip Hop Awards, while it was nominated for Outstanding Album at the 2011 NAACP Image Awards. The album received a nomination for Top Rap Album at the 2011 Billboard Music Awards, though ultimately lost to fellow rapper Eminem's Recovery.

For the 54th Annual Grammy Awards in 2012, My Beautiful Dark Twisted Fantasy was awarded Best Rap Album, while "All of the Lights" was nominated for Song of the Year, Best Rap Song, and Best Rap/Sung Collaboration, winning in the latter two categories. However, The Recording Academy's decision not to nominate My Beautiful Dark Twisted Fantasy for Album of the Year was viewed by many media outlets as a snub, along with the rejection of West and Jay-Z's 2011 effort Watch the Throne in the category. For the Los Angeles Times, Randall Roberts pinpointed the exclusion of My Beautiful Dark Twisted Fantasy – "the most critically acclaimed album of the year, a career-defining record" – as a snub in favor of nominating less substantial albums. Time journalist Touré deemed West's nominations in minor Grammy categories as booby prizes and stated that the album was easily "the best reviewed album in many years", being lauded by critics "like nothing since Radiohead's zenith", while achieving success with over 1,200,000 sales. Touré explored possible reasons for the academy to snub West, including split votes between My Beautiful Dark Twisted Fantasy and Watch the Throne and concerns over his past controversies, but ultimately perceived "a lack of respect for hip hop and its complexity" from those who are into music, yet lack knowledge of this genre.

Having expressed that he thought he was snubbed for major awards in the past, West responded to the Grammy nominees onstage during a concert on the Watch the Throne Tour in December 2011. West believed the snub was due to releasing Watch the Throne and My Beautiful Dark Fantasy within a year of each other, feeling he "should've just spaced it out, just a little bit more". On the 10th anniversary of My Beautiful Dark Twisted Fantasy, Will Lavin of NME recalled that despite winning Best Rap Album, "it was snubbed for Best Album without so much as a nomination". Two years later, Vibe listed the record as one of 10 rap albums snubbed of Album of the Year, with Preezy Brown mentioning this was "a Grammy snub that's one of the more egregious in recent memory".

== Track listing ==
My Beautiful Dark Twisted Fantasy standard edition
No.	Title	Writer(s)	Producer(s)	Length
1.	"Dark Fantasy"	Kanye West; Robert Diggs; Ernest Wilson; Jeff Bhasker; Mike Dean; Malik Jones; Justin Vernon; Onika Maraj; Jon Anderson; Mike Oldfield	RZA; West; No I.D.; Bhasker^{[b]}; M. Dean^{[b]}	4:40
2.	"Gorgeous" (featuring Kid Cudi and Raekwon)	West; Wilson; M. Dean; Jones; Che Smith; Corey Woods; Scott Mescudi; Gene Clark; Roger McGuinn	West; No I.D.; M. Dean	5:57
3.	"Power"	West; Larry Griffin Jr.; M. Dean; Bhasker; Andwele Gardner; Ken Lewis; Francois Bernheim; Jean-Pierre Lang; Boris Bergman; Robert Fripp; Michael Giles; Greg Lake; Ian McDonald; Peter Sinfield	S1; West; Bhasker^{[b]}; M. Dean^{[b]}	4:52
4.	"All of the Lights (Interlude)"	West; M. Dean	West; M. Dean	1:02
5.	"All of the Lights"	West; Bhasker; Mescudi; Jones; Warren Trotter; Stacy Ferguson	West; Bhasker^{[a]}	4:59
6.	"Monster" (featuring Jay-Z, Rick Ross, Nicki Minaj and Bon Iver)	West; Shawn Carter; Patrick Reynolds; M. Dean; William Roberts II; Maraj; Vernon; Jones; Ben Bronfman; Daniel Lynas; Harley Wertheimer	West; M. Dean^{[b]}; Plain Pat^{[b]}	6:18
7.	"So Appalled" (featuring Swizz Beatz, Jay-Z, Pusha T, Cyhi the Prynce and RZA)	West; Wilson; M. Dean; Carter; Terrence Thornton; Cydel Young; Kasseem Dean; Diggs; Manfred Mann	West; No I.D.; M. Dean^{[a]}	6:37
8.	"Devil in a New Dress" (featuring Rick Ross)	West; Roosevelt Harrell; M. Dean; Roberts; Jones; Carole King; Gerry Goffin	Bink; M. Dean^{[b]}	5:52
9.	"Runaway" (featuring Pusha T)	West; Emile Haynie; Thornton; Bhasker; M. Dean; Jones; Peter Phillips; John Branch	West; Emile^{[a]}; Bhasker^{[a]}; M. Dean^{[a]}	9:07
10.	"Hell of a Life"	West; Mike Caren; Wilson; M. Dean; Sylvester Stewart; Tony Joe White; Terence Butler; Anthony Iommi; John Osbourne; William Ward	West; Caren^{[a]}; No I.D.^{[a]}; M. Dean^{[a]}	5:27
11.	"Blame Game" (featuring John Legend)	West; Justin Franks; Chloe Mitchell; M. Dean; John Stephens; Richard D. James	West; DJ Frank E; M. Dean^{[b]}	7:49
12.	"Lost in the World" (featuring Bon Iver)	West; Bhasker; Manu Dibango; James Brown; Vernon; Gil Scott-Heron; Edwin Bocage; Alfred Scramuzza	West; Bhasker^{[a]}	4:16
13.	"Who Will Survive in America"	West; Bhasker; Scott-Heron; Bocage; Scramuzza	West; Bhasker^{[a]}	1:38
Total length:				68:34

iTunes Store bonus track
No.	Title	Writer(s)	Producer(s)	Length
14.	"See Me Now" (featuring Beyoncé, Charlie Wilson and Big Sean)	West; Sean Anderson; Beyoncé Knowles; Charles Wilson	West; No I.D.; Lex Luger	6:03
Total length:				74:37

Deluxe edition bonus DVD
No.	Title	Writer(s)	Director(s)	Length
1.	"Runaway" (short film)	Hype Williams; West	West	35:00

Track notes

- ^{^[a]} signifies a co-producer
- ^{^[b]} signifies an additional producer
- "Dark Fantasy" features background vocals by Nicki Minaj and Bon Iver member Justin Vernon, and additional vocals by Teyana Taylor and Amber Rose
- "Gorgeous" features background vocals by Tony Williams
- "Power" features additional vocals by Dwele
- "All of the Lights" features additional vocals by Rihanna, Kid Cudi, Tony Williams, The-Dream, Charlie Wilson, John Legend, Elly Jackson of La Roux, Alicia Keys, Elton John, Fergie, Ryan Leslie, Drake, Alvin Fields and Ken Lewis
- "Runaway" features background vocals by Tony Williams and additional vocals by The-Dream
- "Hell of a Life" features additional vocals by Teyana Taylor and The-Dream
- "Blame Game" features additional vocals by Chris Rock and Salma Kenas
- "Lost in the World" and "Who Will Survive in America" feature additional vocals by Charlie Wilson, Kaye Fox, Tony Williams, Alicia Keys and Elly Jackson of La Roux

Sample credits

- "Dark Fantasy" contains samples of "In High Places", written by Mike Oldfield and Jon Anderson, and performed by Anderson.
- "Gorgeous" contains portions and elements of the composition "You Showed Me", written by Gene Clark and Roger McGuinn, and performed by The Turtles.
- "Power" contains elements from "It's Your Thing", performed by Cold Grits; elements of "Afromerica", written by Francois Bernheim, Jean-Pierre Lang, and Boris Bergman, and performed by Continent Number 6; and material sampled from "21st Century Schizoid Man", composed by Robert Fripp, Michael Giles, Greg Lake, Ian McDonald, and Peter Sinfield, and performed by King Crimson.
- "So Appalled" contains samples of "You Are – I Am", written by Manfred Mann, and performed by Manfred Mann's Earth Band.
- "Devil in a New Dress" contains samples of "Will You Love Me Tomorrow", written by Carole King and Gerry Goffin, and performed by Smokey Robinson.
- "Runaway" contains a sample of "Expo 83", written by J. Branch, and performed by Backyard Heavies; and excerpts from Rick James Live at Long Beach, CA, 1981.
- "Hell of a Life" contains samples of "She's My Baby", written by Sylvester Stewart, and performed by The Mojo Men; samples of "Stud-Spider" by Tony Joe White; and portions of "Iron Man", written by Terence Butler, Anthony Iommi, John Osbourne, and William Ward, and performed by Black Sabbath.
- "Blame Game" contains elements of "Avril 14th", written and performed by Richard James.
- "Lost in the World" contains portions of "Soul Makossa", written by Manu Dibango; a sample of "Think (About It)", written by James Brown, and performed by Lyn Collins; samples of "Woods", written by Justin Vernon, and performed by Bon Iver; and "Comment No. 1", written and performed by Gil Scott-Heron.
- "Who Will Survive in America" contains samples of "Comment No. 1" performed by Gil Scott-Heron.

== Personnel ==
Credits adapted from the album's liner notes.

=== Musicians ===
- Jeff Bhasker – keyboards (tracks 1, 3, 5, 7, 9, 12, 13), piano (track 6), cello arrangement (track 1)
- Mike Dean – keyboards (tracks 3, 5, 7, 10), piano (tracks 1, 8, 11), bass (tracks 3, 8, 11), guitars (tracks 3, 8), guitar solo (track 2), cello arrangement (tracks 1, 5, 7)
- Ken Lewis – guitars (track 2), bass (track 2), organ (track 2), brass and woodwinds (track 5), tribal drum programming (track 12, 13), horn arrangement (track 5), chant vocals (tracks 3, 12, 13)
- Brent Kolatalo – keyboards (track 2), drum programming (track 2)
- Anthony Kilhoffer – additional drum programming (tracks 10, 12, 13)
- Danny Flam – brass and woodwinds (track 5)
- Tony Gorruso – brass and woodwinds (track 5)
- Rosie Danvers – orchestral arrangement and conducting (track 5), cello (track 5)
- Chris "Hitchcock" Chorney – cello (tracks 1–3, 5, 7, 9, 11), cello arrangement (track 11)
- Mike Lovatt – trumpet (tracks 4, 5)
- Simon Finch – trumpet (tracks 4, 5)
- Alvin Fields – chant vocals (tracks 3, 12, 13)

=== Production ===
- Andrew Dawson – recording (tracks 1–3, 5–13), mixing (tracks 1, 10, 11)
- Anthony Kilhoffer – recording (tracks 1–3, 5–10, 12, 13), mixing (tracks 2, 5, 9–13)
- Mike Dean – recording (tracks 1–3, 5–10, 12, 13), mixing (tracks 1, 4, 6–8, 10, 11)
- Noah Goldstein – recording (tracks 1, 2, 4, 5, 7, 8, 10–13)
- Phil Joly – recording (tracks 2, 4), engineering assistance (tracks 1, 2, 5, 11)
- Christian Mochizuki – recording (track 2), engineering assistance (tracks 1, 2, 5–10, 12, 13)
- Pete Bischoff – recording (track 7), engineering assistance (tracks 2, 5–8, 10, 12, 13)
- Ryan Gilligan – recording (track 11)
- Marcos Tovar – recording (Rihanna vocals; track 5)
- Manny Marroquin – mixing (track 3)
- Gaylord Holomalia – engineering assistance (tracks 1, 6–8, 10)
- Alex Graupera – engineering assistance (tracks 12, 13)
- Christian Plata – mix engineering assistance (track 3)
- Erik Madrid – mix engineering assistance (track 3)
- Cary Clark – mix engineering assistance (track 9)
- Ken Lewis – chant vocals engineering (track 3)
- Brent Kolatalo – chant vocals engineering (tracks 3, 12, 13), horn engineering (track 5)
- TommyD – orchestra production (track 5)
- Vlado Meller – mastering

=== Design ===
- Kanye West – art direction
- Virgil Abloh – art direction
- George Condo – paintings
- M/M (Paris) – handwritten titles and illustrations, package design
- Fabien Montique – Kanye West photograph

== Charts ==
=== Weekly charts ===
Weekly chart performance
Chart (2010–2026)	Peak position
Austrian Albums (Ö3 Austria)	75
Australian Albums (ARIA)	6
Australian Urban Albums (ARIA)	2
Belgian Albums (Ultratop Flanders)	21
Belgian Albums (Ultratop Wallonia)	43
Canadian Albums (Billboard)	1
Croatian International Albums (HDU)	13
Czech Albums (ČNS IFPI)	30
Danish Albums (Hitlisten)	4
Dutch Albums (Album Top 100)	17
European Albums (Billboard)	19
Finnish Albums (Suomen virallinen lista)	42
French Albums (SNEP)	2
German Albums (Offizielle Top 100)	19
Greek Albums (IFPI)	3
Hungarian Physical Albums (MAHASZ)	19
Irish Albums (IRMA)	18
Japanese Albums (Oricon)	29
Mexican Albums (AMPROFON)	87
New Zealand Albums (RMNZ)	10
Norwegian Albums (VG-lista)	7
Portuguese Albums (AFP)	34
Scottish Albums (Official Charts)	24
South Korean International Albums (Gaon)	9
Spanish Albums (Promusicae)	97
Swedish Albums (Sverigetopplistan)	19
Swiss Albums (Schweizer Hitparade)	10
UK Albums (Official Charts)	16
US Billboard 200	1
US Top R&B/Hip-Hop Albums (Billboard)	1

=== Year-end charts ===
Year-end chart performance
Chart (2010)	Position
Australian Albums (ARIA)	67

Year-end chart performance
Chart (2011)	Position
Australian Albums (ARIA)	49
Canadian Albums (Billboard)	21
US Billboard 200	11
US Top R&B/Hip-Hop Albums (Billboard)	4

Year-end chart performance
Chart (2012)	Position
Australian Urban Albums (ARIA)	45
US Top R&B/Hip-Hop Albums (Billboard)	81

Year-end chart performance
Chart (2015)	Position
Australian Urban Albums (ARIA)	60

Year-end chart performance
Chart (2016)	Position
Australian Urban Albums (ARIA)	57
US Billboard 200	186

Year-end chart performance
Chart (2017)	Position
Australian Urban Albums (ARIA)	56

Year-end chart performance
Chart (2018)	Position
Australian Urban Albums (ARIA)	48
Icelandic Albums (Tónlistinn)	98

Year-end chart performance
Chart (2019)	Position
Australian Urban Albums (ARIA)	37
Icelandic Albums (Tónlistinn)	89

Year-end chart performance
Chart (2020)	Position
Icelandic Albums (Tónlistinn)	65

Year-end chart performance
Chart (2021)	Position
Belgian Albums (Ultratop Flanders)	166
Icelandic Albums (Tónlistinn)	30
US Billboard 200	152

Year-end chart performance
Chart (2022)	Position
Australian Albums (ARIA)	77
Belgian Albums (Ultratop Flanders)	133
Icelandic Albums (Tónlistinn)	21
US Billboard 200	115
US Top R&B/Hip-Hop Albums (Billboard)	96

Year-end chart performance
Chart (2023)	Position
Australian Albums (ARIA)	77
Belgian Albums (Ultratop Flanders)	135
Icelandic Albums (Tónlistinn)	16
US Billboard 200	175

Year-end chart performance
Chart (2024)	Position
Australian Albums (ARIA)	91
Australian Hip Hop/R&B Albums (ARIA)	25
Belgian Albums (Ultratop Flanders)	94
Danish Albums (Hitlisten)	99
Icelandic Albums (Tónlistinn)	27
US Billboard 200	137
US Top R&B/Hip-Hop Albums (Billboard)	68

Year-end chart performance
Chart (2025)	Position
Belgian Albums (Ultratop Flanders)	99
Icelandic Albums (Tónlistinn)	46

== Certifications ==
Certifications and sales
Region	Certification	Certified units/sales
Australia (ARIA)	2× Platinum	140,000^{‡}
Brazil (Pro-Música Brasil)	Gold	20,000^{‡}
Denmark (IFPI Danmark)	3× Platinum	60,000^{‡}
Germany (BVMI)	Gold	100,000^{‡}
Italy (FIMI)	Platinum	50,000^{‡}
New Zealand (RMNZ)	4× Platinum	60,000^{‡}
United Kingdom (BPI)	2× Platinum	600,000^{‡}
United States (RIAA)	5× Platinum	5,000,000^{‡} / 1,300,000
^{‡} Sales+streaming figures based on certification alone.

== Release history ==
Release dates and formats
Region	Date	Label(s)	Format(s)	Ref.
Various	November 22, 2010	Def Jam; Roc A Fella	Digital download	
Various	November 22, 2010	Virgin EMI	CD	
United States	December 28, 2010	Def Jam; Roc A Fella	Vinyl	
