= Maneater (Hall & Oates song) =

1982 single by Daryl Hall & John Oates

Single by Hall & Oates

from the album H_{2}O
- B-side: "Delayed Reaction"
- Released: September 28, 1982
- Recorded: December 1981
- Studio: Electric Lady, New York City
- Genre: Synth-pop; new wave; R&B; blue-eyed soul; soft rock
- Length: 4:31; 3:28 (DJ 7"); 6:00 (extended club mix)
- Label: RCA Victor
- Songwriters: Sara Allen; Daryl Hall; John Oates
- Producers: Daryl Hall; John Oates

Hall & Oates singles chronology
"Your Imagination" (1982)	"Maneater" (1982)	"One on One" (1983)

Music video
- "Maneater" on YouTube

"Maneater" is a song by American duo Hall & Oates, featured on their eleventh studio album, H_{2}O (1982). It reached number one on the Billboard Hot 100 chart on December 18, 1982. It remained in the top spot for four weeks, longer than any of the duo's five other number-one hits, including "Kiss on My List", which remained in the top spot for three weeks.

== Background and writing ==
In an interview with American Songwriter in 2009, Daryl Hall recalled:

John had written a prototype of "Maneater"; he was banging it around with Edgar Winter. It was like a reggae song. I said, "Well, the chords are interesting, but I think we should change the groove." I changed it to that Motown kind of groove. So we did that, and I played it for Sara Allen and sang it for her…[Sings] "Oh here she comes / Watch out boy she'll chew you up / Oh here she comes / She's a maneater… and a…" I forget what the last line was. She said, "drop that shit at the end and go, 'She's a maneater,' and stop! And I said, 'No, you're crazy, that's messed up.'" Then I thought about it, and I realized she was right. And it made all the difference in the song.

Hall also opined, "We try and take chances. Our new single 'Maneater' isn't something that sounds like anything else on the radio. The idea is to make things better."

John Oates has explained that the song was originally written "about NYC in the '80s. It's about greed, avarice, and spoiled riches. But we have it in the setting of a girl because it's more relatable. It's something that people can understand. That's what we do all of the time", after describing how they took a similar approach with the earlier song "I Can't Go for That (No Can Do)".

For the song's saxophone solo, Hugh Padgham processed the instrument with an AMS digital delay unit, which provided a delayed repeat to the notes. Padgham was not present when the saxophone solo was recorded and believed that the section could have benefited from a more active part. During the mixing process, Padgham said that "we were playing it through and I was frustrated because I didn't like the sax solo that much. I thought it needed more, it was so laid back. I thought: sod it, I'll completely fill in the gaps." Hall and Oates did not intend on adjusting the saxophone solo but ultimately approved of the changes that Padgham made.

== Critical reception ==
Billboard called it a "moody midtempo piece which has the percolating bass line of a mid-60's Supremes record and the atmospheric sweep of a Giorgio Moroder film score." Cash Box said that the opening bassline resembles that of the Supremes' song "You Can't Hurry Love."

== Music video ==
The Hall & Oates music video opens with a woman (Aleksandra Duncan) walking down a red staircase, and the band playing in a dimly lit studio with shafts of light projecting down on them. The band members step in and out of the light for their lip sync. A young woman in a short party dress is shown in fade-in and fade-out shots, along with a black jaguar, hence the song line "The woman is wild, a she-cat tamed by the purr of a Jaguar." (In the lyrics' context, the Jaguar in question is the car manufacturer.)

== Legal action ==
In November 2008, Hall & Oates initiated legal action against their music publisher Warner/Chappell Music. An unidentified singer-songwriter was alleged to have used "Maneater" in a 2006 recording, infringing copyright, and by failing to sue for copyright infringement, Warner Chappell Music was alleged to have breached their contract with Hall and Oates.

== Personnel ==
- Daryl Hall – lead vocals and backing vocals, keyboards, synthesizers
- John Oates – lead guitar, backing vocals, Linn LM-1 programming
- G. E. Smith – rhythm guitar, backing vocals
- Tom Wolk – bass
- Mickey Curry – drums
- Charles DeChant – saxophone

== Charts ==
=== Weekly charts ===
Weekly chart performance for "Maneater"
Chart (1982–1983)	Peak position
Australia (Kent Music Report)	4
Belgium (Ultratop 50 Flanders)	8
Canada Top Singles (RPM)	4
Canada Adult Contemporary (RPM)	1
Denmark (IFPI)	5
Ireland (IRMA)	8
Netherlands (Dutch Top 40)	17
Netherlands (Single Top 100)	18
New Zealand (Recorded Music NZ)	4
Norway (VG-lista)	6
South Africa (Springbok Radio)	2
Spain (AFYVE)	1
Sweden (Sverigetopplistan)	5
Switzerland (Schweizer Hitparade)	2
UK Singles (Official Charts)	6
US Billboard Hot 100	1
US Adult Contemporary (Billboard)	14
US Dance Club Songs (Billboard)	18
US Hot R&B/Hip-Hop Songs (Billboard)	78
US Mainstream Rock Airplay (Billboard)	18
US Cash Box Top 100	1
US Top 100 Black Contemporary Singles (Cash Box)	68
West Germany (GfK)	15

=== Year-end charts ===
1982 year-end chart performance for "Maneater"
Chart (1982)	Position
Canada Top Singles (RPM)	35
US Cash Box Top 100	22

1983 year-end chart performance for "Maneater"
Chart (1983)	Position
US Billboard Hot 100	7
West Germany (Official German Charts)	57

== Certifications ==
Certifications for "Maneater"
Region	Certification	Certified units/sales
Canada (Music Canada)	Platinum	100,000^{^}
Denmark (IFPI Danmark)	Platinum	90,000^{‡}
Germany (BVMI)	Gold	300,000^{‡}
New Zealand (RMNZ)	3× Platinum	90,000^{‡}
Spain (Promusicae)	Platinum	100,000^{‡}
United Kingdom (BPI)	2× Platinum	1,200,000^{‡}
United States (RIAA)	Gold	1,000,000^{^}
^{^} Shipments figures based on certification alone.^{‡} Sales+streaming figures based on certification alone.

== In other media ==
In 2017 with the opening of the GCI wooden coaster Mystic Timbers at Kings Island in Mason, Ohio. Maneater is one of the songs that has the possibility to play from an abandoned radio in “The Shed” at the end of the ride before the jump-scare going into the rides station.

Maneater appears prominently in the 2023 comedy film No Hard Feelings when the character Percy (Andrew Barth Feldman) performs the song on piano during a restaurant scene. It is also revealed that he misunderstood the meaning of the lyrics, having assumed for years that said song was about a monster. The song also plays during a fight sequence at a beach.

== See also ==
- List of Billboard Hot 100 number-singles of 1982
- List of Billboard Hot 100 number-singles of 1983
