= Love & Hip Hop: Hollywood season 4 =

Love & Hip Hop: Hollywood
- Season 4
- Cover used by the iTunes Store
- Starring: Keyshia Cole; Moniece Slaughter; Teairra Marí; Nikki Mudarris; Lyrica Anderson; Hazel-E; Princess Love; Safaree Samuels; Ray J
- No. of episodes: 16

Release
- Original network: VH1
- Original release: July 24 – October 23, 2017

Season chronology
- ← Previous; Season 3 Next → Season 5

The fourth season of the reality television series Love & Hip Hop: Hollywood aired on VH1 from July 24, 2017, until October 23, 2017. It was primarily filmed in Los Angeles, California. It is executively produced by Mona Scott-Young and Stephanie Gayle for Monami Entertainment, Toby Barraud, Stefan Springman, Mala Chapple, David DiGangi, Michael Lang and Gilda Brasch for Eastern TV, and Nina L. Diaz and Vivian Gomez for VH1.

The series chronicles the lives of several women and men in the Los Angeles area, involved in hip hop music. It consist of 16 episodes, including a two-part reunion special hosted by Nina Parker.

== Production ==
The cast of the fourth season, top row: Safaree, Lyrica, Teairra and Moniece. bottom row: Nikki, Princess, Ray J, Hazel and Keyshia.

Season four of Love & Hip Hop: Hollywood began filming in February 2017. On March 17, 2017, singer Keyshia Cole revealed that she had joined the cast for its newest season, along with her estranged ex-husband Daniel "Booby" Gibson.

On April 13, 2017, VH1 announced that Love & Hip Hop: Hollywood would be returning for a fourth season on July 17, 2017. On June 19, 2017, VH1 revealed the show would premiere on July 24, 2017, and released a teaser confirming Cole's involvement with the show, along with a press release confirming the new cast members. Season four saw the promotion of Lyrica Anderson and Safaree Samuels to the main cast, as well as the return of Hazel-E after a season's absence. Lil Fizz and Masika Kalysha were removed from the opening credits and appear as supporting cast members, with Kalysha claiming on social media that her demotion was due to her refusal to film with longtime rival Alexis Skyy. New cast members include Brooke Valentine, songwriter Marcus Black, stylist Zellswag, Moniece's girlfriend A.D. Diggs, Fetty Wap's ex Alexis Skyy, Chanel West Coast, producer Solo Lucci and Bridget Kelly. Love & Hip Hop: New York stars Cisco Rosado and Jade Wifey would make special crossover appearances throughout the season. Although not included in the initial cast announcement, College Hill's Misster Ray, Alexandra Shipp's brother James Shipp Jr. and A.D.'s friend Tiffany Campbell would also appear in supporting roles.

On July 3, 2017, three weeks before the season four premiere, VH1 aired Dirty Little Secrets, a special featuring unseen footage and deleted scenes from the show's first three seasons, along with interviews with the show's cast and producers. On July 13, 2017, VH1 began releasing "meet the cast" interview promos featuring new cast members Brooke Valentine, Booby Gibson, Marcus Black, Zellswag, A.D. Diggs and Alexis Skyy. On July 17, 2017, VH1 released a 6-minute super-trailer.

During the season's reunion special, Safaree announced that he was leaving the show to join the cast of Love & Hip Hop: New York. On October 20, 2017, after sparking violent feuds with nearly every member of the cast and causing controversy for making a series of anti-gay and colorist posts on social media, it was reported that Hazel had been fired from the show. On February 7, 2018, it was reported that Keyshia Cole had quit the show, along with Masika Kaylsha, after breaking the fourth wall several times on the show to express her displeasure with producers, as well as threatening legal action and storming off set.

== Cast ==
=== Starring ===
- Keyshia Cole (12 episodes)
- Moniece Slaughter (15 episodes)
- Teairra Marí (11 episodes)
- Nikki Mudarris (12 episodes)
- Lyrica Anderson (11 episodes)
- Hazel-E (13 episodes)
- Princess Love (6 episodes)
- Safaree Samuels (10 episodes)
- Ray J (9 episodes)

=== Also starring ===
- Daniel "Booby" Gibson (11 episodes)
- Masika Kalysha (12 episodes)
- Zellswag (14 episodes)
- Lil' Fizz (9 episodes)
- Brooke Valentine (14 episodes)
- Marcus Black (13 episodes)
- Alexis Skyy (13 episodes)
- A1 Bentley (12 episodes)
- Chanel West Coast (10 episodes)
- Jade Wifey (2 episodes)
- Solo Lucci (10 episodes)
- Cisco Rosado (7 episodes)
- A.D. Diggs (12 episodes)
- Misster Ray (10 episodes)
- Bridget Kelly (9 episodes)
- Nia Riley (9 episodes)
- James Shipp Jr. (6 episodes)
- Tiffany Campbell (4 episodes)

Hazel's boyfriend Rose Burgundy, Keyshia's cousin Marquisha Miller, Lyrica Garrett, Pam Bentley, Amber Diamond and Donatella appear as guest stars in several episodes. The show also features minor appearances from notable figures within the hip hop industry and Hollywood's social scene, including Too $hort, AngelGold, Solo Lucci's baby mama Sara Scott, Misster Ray's boyfriend Vic the Leo, Nikki's mother Michelle Mudarris, Moniece's cousin Stevie Mackey, Miss Diddy, Bobby Brown, J-Boog, Apryl Jones and Yesi Ortiz.

== Episodes ==
No. overall	No. in season	Title	Original release date	US viewers (millions)
43	1	"Girl Fight"	July 24, 2017	2.29
Keyshia Cole confronts unresolved issues with her estranged husband while Hazel-E squares off against her haters at a women's empowerment event. A new arrival threatens to change Masika's world. Hazel returns to the opening credits and Keyshia Cole, Lyrica and Safaree are added to the opening credits, replacing Masika and Fizz, who are demoted to supporting cast members. Keyshia Cole, Booby, Zell, Brooke, Marcus and Alexis join the cast. Although credited, Lyrica, Princess and Ray J do not appear.
44	2	"Make It Count"	July 31, 2017	2.08
Ray J's struggle to start a family leads to an outrageous bet with A1 and Safaree; Keyshia gets advice from Too Short; Nikki Baby connects Chanel West Coast with a producer; Brooke goes on a mission to uncover the truth. Chanel West Coast and Jade join the supporting cast. Although credited, Teairra, Hazel and Princess do not appear.
45	3	"New Bae"	August 7, 2017	2.28
Teairra's new man clashes with her social circle and Chanel leaps to her friend's defence at Safaree's party. Ray J.'s secret weighs on his conscience, while Lyrica issues a startling demand to A1. Solo Lucci and Cisco join the supporting cast. Although credited, Keyshia does not appear.
46	4	"Got Swag?"	August 14, 2017	2.18
Masika hires Misster Ray to plan an event, only to get caught in the crossfire; concerns mount over Teairra's self-destructive behavior; A1 considers a collaboration with Keyshia Cole. Although credited, Lyrica, Hazel, Princess, Safaree and Ray do not appear.
47	5	"Spirit Animal"	August 21, 2017	2.04
Mayhem erupts at Safaree and Chanel's music video shoot; Misster Ray's attempt to make nice with Masika leads to a wild encounter with Zell; Teairra lashes out at Cisco, Moniece and Nia. Although credited, Nikki, Princess and Ray do not appear.
48	6	"Gusbands & Wives"	August 27, 2017	1.01
Shocking allegations blow up Masika and Nia's dinner for Zell and Misster Ray; Teairra and Cisco's shopping trip ends in tears; Moniece struggles with the other woman in her relationship; Booby worries about Keyshia's response. A.D. and Misster Ray join the supporting cast. Although credited, Lyrica, Princess, Safaree and Ray do not appear.
49	7	"Shady Ladies"	August 28, 2017	2.14
The women are forced to take sides in a clique war, whilst Ray J tries to develop a new image for Bridget Kelly. Moniece squares off with A.D.'s best friend. Bridget Kelly joins the supporting cast. Although credited, Keyshia, Nikki and Safaree do not appear.
50	8	"Squad Goals"	September 4, 2017	1.73
Moniece and Alexis' social media beef spills into the streets; Teairra's behavior at Nikki Baby's event leads to an emotional confrontation; Ray J. goes to extreme lengths to show Princess he's ready for fatherhood. Although credited, Keyshia and Safaree do not appear.
51	9	"Intervention"	September 11, 2017	2.09
Teairra makes a critical decision about her future; warring cliques unite in an effort to end the conflict between Masika and Alexis; Marcus confronts Brooke and Booby; Zell sabotages the launch party. James joins the supporting cast. Although credited, Keyshia, Princess and Safaree do not appear.
52	10	"Musical Chairs"	September 18, 2017	1.94
Brooke fends off competition; Tiffany exposes cracks in Moniece and A.D.'s relationship; Hazel's mother encourages her to go after a "real baller"; A1 teaches Chanel a lesson; Marcus and Bridget have a secret encounter. Tiffany joins the supporting cast. Although credited, Teairra, Nikki, Princess and Ray J do not appear.
53	11	"Friends with Benefits"	September 25, 2017	2.00
Masika plots her revenge against Zell, Hazel brings out Brooke's angry side, Alexis pushes Moniece and A.D. to the breaking point and Nikki and Safaree join Chanel and her new love interest. Although credited, Teairra, Lyrica, Princess and Ray J do not appear.
54	12	"Boy Band"	October 2, 2017	1.97
Bobby Brown pushes Fizz to consider a B2K reunion. Booby and Brooke's romantic getaway takes an unexpected turn. Zell reveals a messy musical side-project. Hazel learns the truth about her song with Ray J and Safaree's cousin visits. Although credited, Moniece, Teairra, Princess and Ray J do not appear.
55	13	"Exit Stage Left"	October 9, 2017	2.08
Brooke schemes to expose Marcus and Bridget, Fizz makes a daring move. A1 helps Lyrica face an emotional hurdle, and Masika and Hazel come face-to-face. Although credited, Teairra, Nikki, Princess and Safaree do not appear.
56	14	"No Place Like Home"	October 16, 2017	2.12
Safaree says goodbye to Hollywood and makes one last play for Nikki Baby. Teairra returns from rehab with a complicated new perspective. An angry confrontation rocks Fizz's B2K reunion. Although credited, Lyrica does not appear.
57	15	"Reunion – Part 1"	October 16, 2017	2.24
Masika and Alexis Skyy air their dirty laundry, Moniece and Hazel-E address social media beefs, and Ray J and Princess share frustrations with trying to have a baby. host: Nina Parker
58	16	"Reunion – Part 2"	October 23, 2017	2.13
The conclusion of Zell Swag and Misster Ray's blow-up. Bridget and Booby discuss the kiss in Catalina, and Keyshia Cole takes the stage for a special performance. host: Nina Parker

== Webisodes ==
=== Check Yourself ===
Love & Hip Hop Hollywood: Check Yourself, which features the cast's reactions to each episode, was released weekly with every episode on digital platforms.

List of Love & Hip Hop Hollywood: Check Yourself Season 4 episodes

Episode	Title	Featured cast members	Ref
1	"Dusty, Crusty & Not Trusty"	Masika, Zell, Moniece	
2	"I'm Kinky, But That's Another Level"	Brooke, Marcus, Safaree, Masika, Lyrica, Moniece, Zell	
3	"Don't Interrupt the Vibe"	Brooke, Safaree, Marcus	
4	"It's a Mess"	Masika, Zell, Moniece, Brooke, Marcus	
5	"Catch the Fade Outside"	Masika, Zell, Misster Ray, Hazel, Moniece	
6	"That's the Crazy Bitch Smile"	Zell, Masika, Moniece	
7	"The Walk-Off Queens"	Alexis, Moniece, Zell, Misster Ray	
8	"A1 is the Petty King"	Lyrica, A1, Moniece, Misster Ray, Zell, Hazel	
9	"Catch the Shade"	Moniece, Zell, Misster Ray, Bridget, Marcus, A1	
10	"You Can't Sit with Us"	Hazel, Chanel, A1, Marcus, Brooke, Bridget	
11	"We Throw These Hands"	A1, Marcus, Zell, Moniece	
12	"Are You Going to Lie On Your Dick?"	Zell, Bridget, Chanel	
13	"Her Wig is Coming Off"	Masika, Moniece, Brooke, Bridget, Zell, A1, Marcus	
14	"Explain Yourself, Booby"	Moniece, Zell, Marcus, A1	

=== Bonus scenes ===
Deleted scenes from the season's episodes were released weekly as bonus content on VH1's official website.

List of Love & Hip Hop: Hollywood Season 4 bonus scenes

Episode	Title	Featured cast members	Ref
1	"Moniece & A.D. Open Up About Their Relationship" (Extended scene)	Moniece, A.D., Masika, Zell	
1	"Masika Needs Ear Protection From Hazel-E's Music" (Extended scene)	Masika, Zell, Moniece	
2	"Ray J Gives A1 Marital Advice" (Extended scene)	Ray J, A1, Safaree	
2	"Safaree Brings Ray J A Gift to Help with His Sperm Count" (Extended scene)	Safaree, Ray J	
3	"Alexis Skyy Warns Lyrica About A1 Losing Focus"	Alexis, Solo Lucci, Lyrica, A1	
3	"Can Zell Support Teairra's Relationship with Cisco?"	Zell, Teairra	
4	"Princess, Alexis Skyy & Lyrica Get Their V's Steamed"	Princess, Alexis, Lyrica	
4	"Masika Helps Solo Lucci's Baby Mama Find Alexis Skyy"	Masika, Sara Scott	
5	"Nikki Baby Wants the Tea on Hazel-E's New Man"	Hazel, Nikki, Alexis	
5	"Moniece Is Over the Teairra Situation"	Moniece, A.D.	
6	"Amber Diamond Cries Over Cisco" (Extended scene)	Amber Diamond, Joe Fabolous	
6	"Cisco Explains Why He Cheated on Teairra"	Cisco, Solo Lucci, A1	
7	"Lyrica Gives Princess Baby Making Advice"	Lyrica, Princess	
7	"A.D. is in the Dog House"	Moniece, A.D.	
8	"Teairra Opens Up to Zell About Cisco"	Teairra, Zell	
8	"Ray J Would Rather Be in the Studio, Then Make a Baby"	Ray J, Princess	
9	"Teairra's Friends Prepare for Her Intervention"	Moniece, Nikki, A.D., Fizz, Nia, Christine	
10	"Fizz Wants to Take His Son While Moniece & A.D. Figure Things Out"	Fizz, Moniece	
10	"Fizz Vents to Safaree" (Extended scene)	Fizz, Safaree	
11	"Tiffany Sabotages A.D. & Moniece's Relationship"	A.D., Tiffany	
11	"Moniece Tells Masika About Alexis Skyy's Apology" (Extended scene)	Moniece, Masika	
12	"A1 Agrees to Get in the Studio with Chanel West Coast"	A1, Chanel	
12	"Booby Invites Bridget Kelly Out for Drinks"	Booby, Bridget	
13	"Masika & Misster Ray Do an Impression of Zell" (Extended scene)	Masika, Misster Ray, Moniece	
13	"Lyrica Wants to See Solo Lucci & Alexis Skyy Back Together" (Extended scene)	Lyrica, Solo Lucci, A1	
14	"Does Teairra Have Unresolved Issues with Nikki & Moniece?"	Teairra, Christine	
14	"Fizz Gives Up On Reuniting B2K"	Fizz, J-Boog	

== Music ==
Several cast members had their music featured on the show and released singles to coincide with the airing of the episodes.

List of songs performed and/or featured in Love & Hip Hop: Hollywood season four
Title	Performer	Album	Episode(s)	Notes	Ref
You (feat. Remy Ma & French Montana)	Keyshia Cole	11:11 Reset	1	performed onstage	
Nothing to Something (feat. Marcus Black)	Brooke Valentine	single	1, 10	performed in scene played in studio session	
Wait (feat. TeeFlii)	Hazel-E	single	1	performed onstage	
Incapable	Keyshia Cole	11:11 Reset	1, 16	played in studio session performed onstage	
Countin'	Chanel West Coast	single	2	played at launch party	
Toot That Whoa Whoa (feat. Prince Chrishan)	A1 Bentley (as A1)	single	3	performed onstage	
Unhealthy	Lyrica Anderson	Adia	3	performed in studio session	
Nobody Knows (feat. Brooke Valentine)	Daniel "Booby" Gibson (as Booby Gibson)	single	4, 8	performed in scene	
New Bae (feat. Safaree)	Chanel West Coast	single	5, 12	performed in studio session	
Actin Up	Hazel-E	single	5	performed in music video shoot	
Pussy So Good (feat. Bridget Kelly)	Ray J	unreleased	7, 9	played in studio session	
Me	Marcus Black	single	7	performed onstage	
Don't Take It Personal	Lyrica Anderson	Adia	8, 13	played at launch party	
Dolla Bills (feat. Ty Dolla Sign)	Lyrica Anderson	Adia	9	performed onstage	
Keep Pushin' (feat. Bruce Bang)	Daniel "Booby" Gibson (as Booby Gibson)	single	9, 10	performed in studio session performed onstage	
Ohhh 3x	Masika Kalysha	single	9	performed onstage	
Nothing to Something (feat. Marcus Black)	Bridget Kelly	unreleased	11, 13	performed in studio session	
Drippin' (feat. Alexis Skyy)	Zellswag	single	12, 13	performed in studio session	
One Wish	Ray J	Raydiation	13	performed onstage	
Drop Top Rari (feat. Yung Jaycee)	Marcus Black (as Mvrcus Black)	single	13	played at launch party	
Emotional	Keyshia Cole	11:11 Reset	13	performed in studio session	
Happy for Me	Bridget Kelly	single	13, 14	performed onstage	
P.T.O.S. (feat. Jazze Pha)	Masika Kalysha	single	14	performed onstage	
Hater	Safaree Samuels	It Is What It Is, Vol. 2	14	performed onstage	
Nikki Baby Freestyle	Safaree Samuels	unreleased	14	performed onstage	
Bad	Teairra Marí	single	14	performed in session	
