= List of Love & Hip Hop: Hollywood cast members =

Love & Hip Hop: Hollywood is the third installment of the Love & Hip Hop reality television franchise. It premiered on September 15, 2014 on VH1 and chronicles the lives of several people in the Hollywood area, involved with hip hop music.

The series has a large ensemble cast, with leading cast members in the opening credits, and a sprawling supporting cast, who are credited as "additional cast" or "featured" in the show's end credits. These secondary cast members appear in green screen confessional segments and (for the most part) have the same amount of screen time and storyline focus as the show's main cast members. Over the years, several supporting cast members have been upgraded to lead.

== Cast timeline ==
Main cast (appears in opening credits)
Secondary cast (appears in green screen confessional segments and in end credits alongside the main cast)
Guest cast (appears in a guest role or cameo)

Main cast members
Cast member	Seasons					
Cast member	1	2	3	4	5	6
Teairra Marí	Starring					Supporting
Moniece Slaughter	Starring					Supporting
Apryl Jones	Starring			Guest		Starring
Hazel-E	Starring		Supporting	Starring		
Ray J	Starring					
Lil' Fizz	Starring			Supporting		Starring
Omarion	Starring					
Soulja Boy	Starring (Note: Appears in the opening credits for the first two episodes of season three before being reduced to minor guest appearances for the rest of the season.)					
Nikki Mudarris	Supporting		Starring			Supporting
Masika Kalysha	Supporting		Starring	Supporting		
Princess Love	Guest	Supporting	Starring			
Keyshia Cole				Starring		
Lyrica Anderson			Supporting	Starring		
Safaree Samuels			Supporting	Starring	Guest	
K. Michelle (Note: Credited onscreen as "Kimberly".)					Starring	
Brooke Valentine				Supporting	Starring	
A1 Bentley			Supporting		Starring	
Yo-Yo						Starring
Supporting cast members
Cast member	Seasons					
Cast member	1	2	3	4	5	6
Morgan Hardman	Supporting					
Nia Riley	Supporting				Guest (Note: Appears in the Ray J & Princess: Labor of Love special only.)	Guest
Leslie Burrell	Supporting					
Amanda Secor	Supporting					
Yung Berg	Supporting					
Yesi Ortiz	Supporting		Guest			
Sincere Show	Supporting					
Milan Christopher		Supporting				
Rich Dollaz		Supporting		Guest (Note: Appears in the Dirty Little Secrets special only.)		
Amber Laura		Supporting				
Miles Brock		Supporting		Guest		
Brandi Boyd		Supporting				
Nastassia Smith		Supporting				
Kamiah Adams		Supporting				
Max Lux		Supporting				
Jason Lee		Supporting				Supporting
Marla Thomas		Supporting				
Shanda Denyce		Supporting				Guest
Willie Taylor		Supporting				Guest
Sonja Norwood	Guest		Supporting		Guest	
Kyesha Shalina			Supporting			
Lyrica Garrett			Supporting	Guest	Supporting	
Pam Bentley			Supporting	Guest	Supporting	
Rosa Acosta			Supporting			
Daniel "Booby" Gibson		Cameo		Supporting	Guest	Supporting
Zellswag				Supporting	Cameo	Supporting
Marcus Black				Supporting		
Alexis Skyy				Supporting		
Chanel West Coast				Supporting		
Jade Wifey				Supporting		
Solo Lucci				Supporting		
Cisco Rosado				Supporting		
A.D. Diggs				Supporting		
Misster Ray				Supporting		
Bridget Kelly				Supporting		
James Shipp Jr.				Supporting		
Tiffany Campbell				Supporting	Guest	
Apple Watts					Supporting	
Paris Phillips					Supporting	
Donatella				Guest	Supporting	
RoccStar					Supporting	
La'Britney					Supporting	
JayWill					Supporting	
Amber Diamond				Guest	Supporting	
Shun Love					Supporting	
John Watts					Supporting	
J-Boog				Guest		Supporting
Brittany B.						Supporting
Micky Munday						Supporting
Tricia Ana						Supporting

== Main cast members ==
=== Original cast members ===
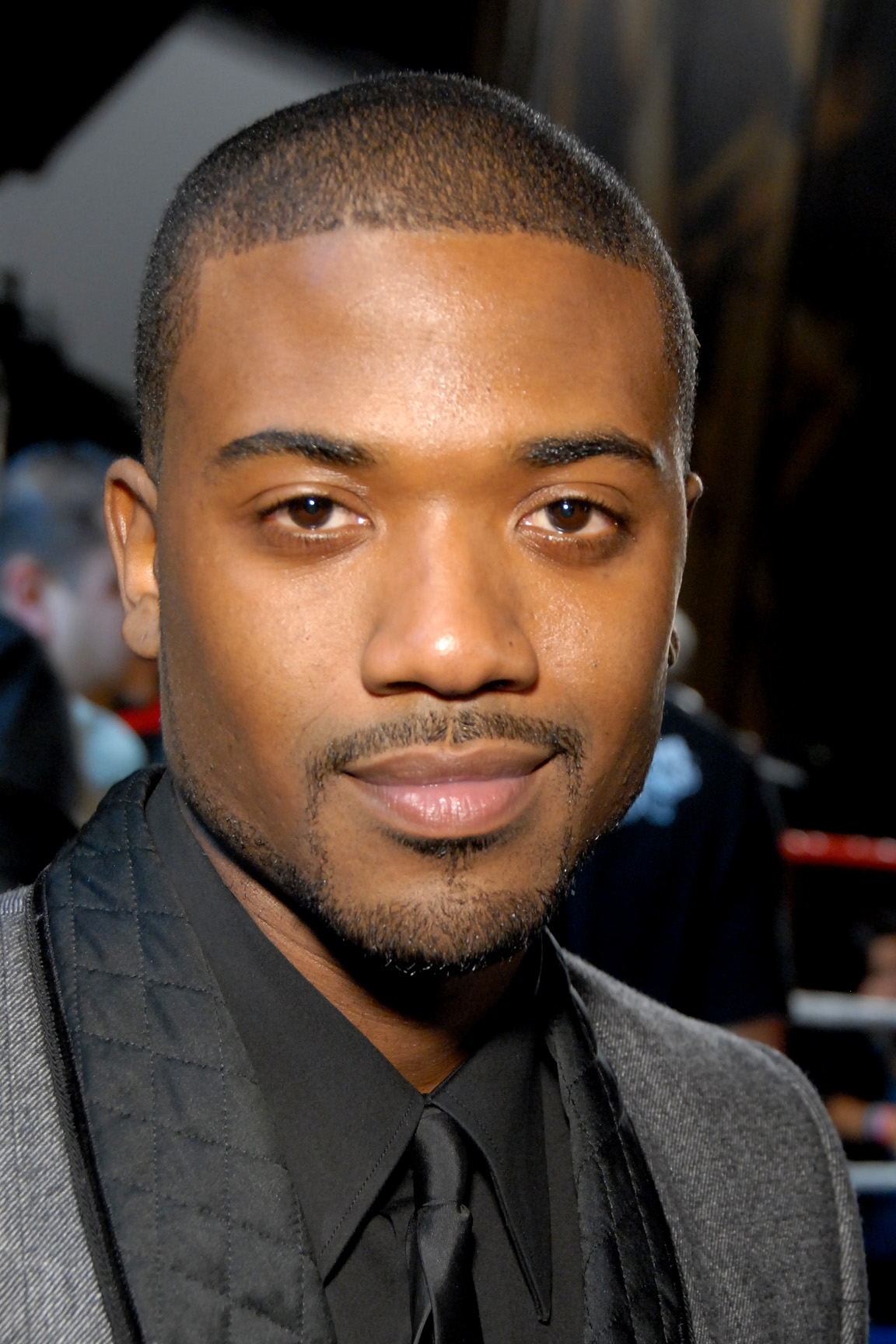
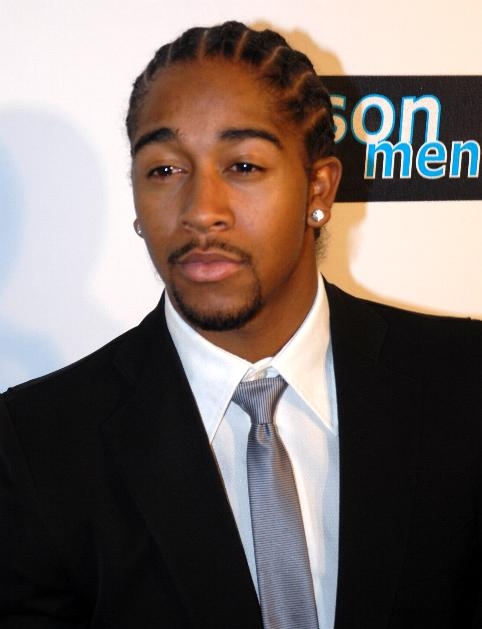
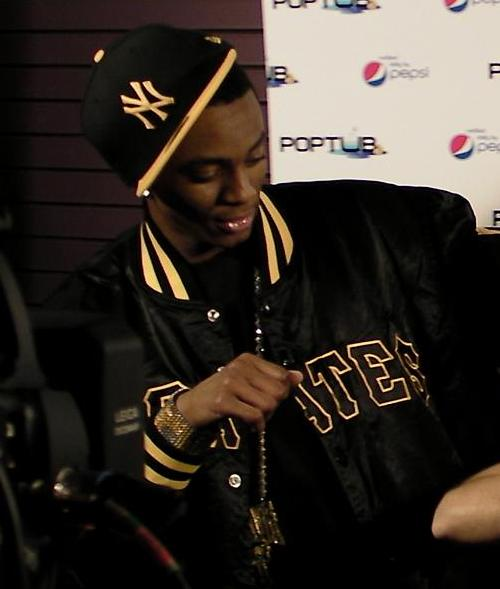
Ray J (top), Omarion (middle) and Soulja Boy (below) are original cast members on Love & Hip Hop: Hollywood.
- Teairra Marí (Seasons 1–5, supporting cast member in season 6), born Teairra Marquisha Thomas, is a R&B/pop singer and actress, originally from Detroit, Michigan. She rose to fame when Jay-Z signed her to Def Jam Recordings at the age of 16, alongside Rihanna. She was dropped from the label in 2006, after poor album sales, and she has struggled to revive her music career ever since. In 2011, Teairra joined the supporting cast of Love & Hip Hop: New York's second season, acting as a friend and confidante to Emily. Several episodes in Love & Hip Hop: New York's second season were filmed in Miami, originally intended to set up a spin-off starring Teairra and Erica Mena. In 2014, Teairra joined the cast of Love & Hip Hop: Hollywood, becoming one of the show's original eight cast members. The first two seasons explore her lingering feelings for Ray J, who she dated on-and-off again for nine years prior to the show, and her violent feud with his girlfriend, Princess Love. The third and fourth seasons delve deeper into her personal struggles and battle with alcoholism, including being charged with battery and theft after an altercation with an Uber driver in 2015. She begins dating producer Cisco Rosado, much to the disapproval of her friends, and her drinking problem worsens, leading to an on-camera intervention and subsequent stint in rehab. In season five, while struggling with sobriety, she enters a relationship with Akbar Abdul-Ahad. Unbeknownst to her, he is already in a polyamorous relationship with two women. The storyline made headlines in May 2018, when a sex tape of Teairra appeared on social media, and she announced in a press conference with Lisa Bloom that she intended to sue Akbar for allegedly leaking the video and 50 Cent for reposting it, citing revenge porn laws. Teairra was criticised by fans, fellow cast members and the media for allegedly fabricating the storyline, which she denies. Teairra returns as a supporting cast member late into season six. She also appears in an episode of Love & Hip Hop Atlanta: After Party Live! and in the special Dirty Little Secrets.
- Moniece Slaughter (Seasons 1–5, supporting cast member in season 6), also known as Kali, is a singer-songwriter, best known for singing the original theme song of America's Next Top Model. Her stepfather is Grammy Award-winning gospel singer Dave Thomas of Take 6. She has a son, Kamron David Frédéric, with Lil' Fizz, born in 2010. Moniece is introduced as Fizz's estranged baby mama, who is struggling to shake off her "deadbeat mom" reputation and provide for her family by starting a sex toy business. During the season, she clashes with Fizz's girlfriend Amanda, which culminates in a violent altercation where Moniece drags her across a table by her hair. Moniece begins dating Love & Hip Hop: New York's Rich Dollaz and takes on a larger role in season two, which explores her mental health issues and her difficult relationship with her mother Marla. She ignites a vicious feud with Princess and Brandi after a confrontation at the second season reunion, which intensifies throughout season three, leading to the uncovering of an alleged sex tape. Moniece reveals her bisexuality at the season three reunion, and her girlfriend, A.D., joins the cast in season four. The season chronicles their relationship struggles, as well as her feud with A.D.'s friend Tiffany, who would begin dating Fizz in season five. After publicly begging producers to be let out of her contract, Moniece confirmed that season five would be her last as a series regular. At the reunion, she and Princess shared a tearful reconciliation, finally ending their feud after several years on the show together. Moniece returns as a supporting cast member in season six, which chronicles her ongoing co-parenting struggles with Fizz, when his dishonesty about his relationship with Apryl drives a wedge between them. Moniece also appears as a supporting cast member in two episodes of season seven of Love & Hip Hop: New York, where she visits New York to expose Rich for trying to rekindle their relationship behind Jade's back, and in eight of Love & Hip Hop: Atlanta, where she has a brief relationship with rapper Scrapp DeLeon. She also appears in the specials The Wedding, Dirty Little Secrets, The Love Edition, Love & Hip Hop Awards: Most Certified and 40 Greatest Love & Hip Hop Moments: The Reboot.
- Apryl Jones (Seasons 1–2, 6, guest star in season 4) is a singer-songwriter, originally from Chicago, Illinois. She is an Afro-Asian of mixed ethnicity, her mother is of Taiwanese, Chinese and Mongolian descent, while her father is African-American with Native American roots. She rose to fame through her relationship with Omarion, who she began dating in 2013. The first season chronicles the pregnancy and birth of her first child with Omarion, Megaa Omari Grandberry, as well as Apryl's strained relationship with Omarion's mother Leslie. Season two explores her career frustrations and insecurities, as Omarion enjoys newfound success. Apryl and Omarion did not attend the taping of the second season's reunion as Omarion was on tour. On December 7, 2015, Apryl confirmed the two had quit the show and would not be returning the next season. On March 7, 2016, Apryl gave birth to Omarion's second child, A'mei Kazuko Grandberry. Four months later, Apryl and Omarion announced their break up. Apryl would make a guest appearance in season four, meeting up with Fizz to discuss a possible B2K reunion. Apryl returns to the show in season six, which chronicles her custody battle with Omarion, as well as the media speculation and scrutiny surrounding her relationship with Fizz. During the season, the two admit that they are romantically involved, putting her into conflict with Moniece and the other cast members.
- Hazel-E (Seasons 1–2, 4, supporting cast member in season 3), born Arica Tiffany Adams, is a publicist, brand consultant, entrepreneur and rapper, originally from Cincinnati, Ohio. She was a military brat who was raised in Houston, Texas by an African-American mother and Puerto Rican father. She became known in the industry for her work as a publicist for artists such as Gnarls Barkley, Tank and The Boondocks creator Aaron McGruder. Hazel is introduced as Teairra's best friend and confidante, having lived together for several years, despite the two often coming to blows throughout the series. The first season chronicles her ill-fated relationship with rapper Yung Berg, who she is in love with but he refuses to claim their relationship as anything more than casual sex. He later begins dating Masika, igniting a bitter feud between the two women that would last the rest of the series' run. After breaking her nose in Dubai and having a drink thrown in her face while filming season two, Hazel quit the series, comparing it to a "freak show". She would return as a supporting cast member towards the end of season three, once again coming face to face with Masika and reigniting their rivalry. Hazel rejoins the main cast in season four, entering a relationship with aspiring rapper Rose Burgundy and beginning what she calls "the Hazel-E stunt phase". After sparking violent feuds with nearly every member of the cast and causing controversy for making a series of anti-gay and colorist posts on social media, it was reported that Hazel had been fired from the show. Hazel also appears in an episode of Love & Hip Hop Atlanta: After Party Live! and in the special Dirty Little Secrets. In 2018, Hazel and her mother Angela appeared on an episode of Iyanla: Fix My Life, where she reveals that she was molested by a female babysitter as a child.
- Ray J, born William Ray Norwood Jr., is a R&B singer, actor, record producer and tech entrepreneur, originally from McComb, Mississippi. He was raised in Carson, California and rose to fame as the brother of singer Brandy Norwood. He is also the cousin of rapper Snoop Dogg. In 2007, he attracted notoriety for his sex tape with reality star Kim Kardashian, which he lampooned in the 2013 single "I Hit It First". He previously starred in the VH1 "celebreality" shows For the Love of Ray J and Brandy & Ray J: A Family Business. Ray is introduced as Teairra's ex-boyfriend, who he dated on and off for the past nine years. The first season chronicles his anger management problems and legal issues, including his 2014 arrest for vandalism and resisting arrest, as well as the demise of his working relationship with his assistant Morgan. At the first season's reunion, he admits to having had previous flings with Moniece and Hazel. Subsequent seasons chronicle his turbulent relationship with model Princess Love, who he proposes to in the second season finale, and marries in season three. The couple welcome their first child, Melody Love Norwood, in season five, her birth featured in the special Ray J & Princess: Labor of Love. During season six, the couple announce that they are expecting their second child together. Ray also appears as a supporting cast member in one episode of the spin-off show Leave It to Stevie, where he visits Atlanta and hangs out with Stevie J, Scrappy and Yung Joc, as a guest star in season two of Love & Hip Hop: Miami, where he and Fizz offer advice to Spectacular on his boy band troubles, in an episode of Love & Hip Hop Atlanta: After Party Live! and in the specials Love & Hip Hop Live: The Wedding, Out in Hip Hop, The Love Edition, Love & Hip Hop Awards: Most Certified (where he won in the Fully Exposed category) and 40 Greatest Love & Hip Hop Moments: The Reboot.
- Lil' Fizz (Seasons 1–3, 6, supporting cast member in seasons 4–5), born Dreux Pierre Frédéric, is a Creole rapper, singer and actor, originally from New Orleans, Louisiana. He came into prominence as a member of the R&B group B2K. He has a son, Kamron David Frédéric, with Moniece Slaughter, born 2010. Fizz's love life drives many of the show's storylines. The first season chronicles his co-parenting struggles with baby mama Moniece, as well as the demise of his relationship with Amanda Secor, who he dumps after discovering she has been unfaithful. He then enjoys a casual relationship with Nikki, which continues into season two. He has a brief fling with model Kamiah Adams, which ends after she is offended when he calls her an "appetizer". Later in the season, he and Moniece come to an understanding after an emotional conversation with her mother Marla, and he supports her through her sex tape scandal in season three. Fizz returns as a supporting cast member in season four, where he attempts to get a B2K reunion tour off the ground with the help of Ray J. In season five, his relationship with Moniece becomes strained after she discovers he has started dating Tiffany, her long time nemesis. Fizz rejoins the main cast in season six, which chronicles the controversy surrounding his blossoming romance with Apryl Jones, his long time friend and baby mama of his B2K group mate Omarion. Fizz also appears as a guest star in season five of Love & Hip Hop: Atlanta, where he and Nikki attend Stevie J and Joseline's Hollywood party, in season two of Love & Hip Hop: Miami, where he and Ray J offer advice to Spectacular on his boy band troubles, in an episode of Love & Hip Hop Atlanta: After Party Live! and in the specials Out in Hip Hop and The Love Edition. He and Tiffany also appear in We TV's Marriage Boot Camp: Hip Hop Edition with Soulja Boy, Nia and several other Love & Hip Hop franchise cast members.
- Omarion (Seasons 1–2), born Omari Ishmael Grandberry, is a Grammy Award-nominated R&B singer and actor. He was born and raised in Inglewood, California. He came into prominence as the lead singer of the R&B group B2K. He began dating his backing vocalist Apryl Jones in 2013. The first season chronicles the pregnancy and birth of his first child with Apryl, Megaa Omari Grandberry, as well as Apryl's strained relationship with his mother Leslie. While appearing on the show, Omarion enjoyed newfound success with the release of "Post to Be", the highest selling song of his career. Subsequently, he appears infrequently in season two, despite being credited in every episode. Omarion and Apryl did not attend the taping of the second season's reunion as he was on tour. On December 7, 2015, Apryl confirmed the two had quit the show and would not be returning the next season. On March 7, 2016, Apryl gave birth to Omarion's second child, A'mei Kazuko Grandberry. Four months later, Omarion and Apryl announced their break up. While B2K's reunion and Millennium Tour is featured prominently in season six and he is mentioned throughout, Omarion does not appear.
- Soulja Boy (Seasons 1–3), born DeAndre Cortez Way, is a Grammy Award-nominated rapper, record producer and entrepreneur. He is best known for his 2007 Billboard Hot 100 hit single, "Crank That (Soulja Boy)". The first season chronicles his relationship with Nia Riley and his struggles with fidelity while on the road touring. In season two, he has a fling with her best friend Nastassia, igniting multiple altercations between the two girls. On August 19, 2016, Soulja Boy posted a video of himself on social media, brandishing a gun and threatening to kill Nia Riley and her alleged boyfriend at the time, Skrill Dilly. After two episodes of season three, Soulja was removed from the opening credits and had nearly all of his scenes deleted, essentially being reduced to a background extra in the two remaining episodes he did appear. On October 4, 2016, Soulja posted "I've decided to quit Love & Hip Hop. I feel my brand is too big for the show now. It's too ratchet." Series creator Mona Scott-Young responded by reposting a meme implying that he had actually been fired. None of this is revealed at any point onscreen or discussed at the reunion, and Soulja is never mentioned on the show again. Soulja and Nia also appear in We TV's Marriage Boot Camp: Hip Hop Edition with Lil' Fizz and Tiffany and several other Love & Hip Hop franchise cast members.

=== Season 3 additions ===
- Miss Nikki Baby (Seasons 3–5, supporting cast member in seasons 1–2, 6), born Nicole Mudarris, is a socialite, lingerie designer and strip club heiress. Nikki grew up in the Hollywood Hills. Her family owns Seventh Veil and The Body Shop, a strip club chain operating in Los Angeles and Las Vegas. Her father Abu is Italian-Lebanese, and is known as the "Godfather of Burlesque", while her mother Michelle is French-Moroccan. Nikki appears as a supporting cast member in the first two seasons. The first season chronicles the demise of her relationship with Brazilian-Egyptian rapper and record producer Mally Mall. He is caught cheating on her with video vixen Masika Kalysha, igniting a feud between the two women and multiple altercations. Later, she begins casually dating Lil' Fizz, which continues into season two. The second season also focuses on her fashion career, including the launch of her lingerie line, Nude By Nikki. Nikki is promoted to main cast in season three, which explores her bisexuality, and relationships with rapper Safaree Samuels and urban model Rosa Acosta. She also opens up about the death of her brother, Anthony Omar Mudarris, who died of a drug overdose in 2015. Nikki's personal life takes a back seat in seasons four and five, and she appears more as a friend and confidante to Teairra, Chanel West Coast and the other women, having little-to-no storyline of her own. She is exposed at different times as having had flings with Cisco Rosado and Solo Lucci, however she insists she slept with neither. Nikki returns in a minor supporting role late into season six. Nikki also appears as a guest star in two episodes of Love & Hip Hop Atlanta: After Party Live!, in season five of Love & Hip Hop: Atlanta as Joseline's friend-with-benefits, and in season two of the spin-off Leave It to Stevie, which features her Hip Hop Squares appearance, as well as the specials Love & Hip Hop Live: The Wedding, Joseline's Special Delivery, Dirty Little Secrets and The Love Edition. She also appears as a contestant on VH1's Scared Famous with Safaree and other Love & Hip Hop franchise cast members.
- Masika Kalysha (Season 3, supporting cast member in seasons 1, 4) is a French Creole urban model, video vixen and singer, originally from Chicago, Illinois. She is known for her appearances in numerous hip hop music videos for artists such as Flo Rida, Waka Flocka Flame and French Montana. Masika appears as a supporting cast member in season one, which chronicles her blossoming romance with producer Mally Mall, unaware of his relationship with Nikki. The two women get into multiple altercations during the season, culminating in Nikki and her mother putting up a billboard plastered with Masika's mugshot from a previous shoplifting charge. Later, Masika moves onto Yung Berg, igniting a bitter feud with Hazel E, which would last the rest of the series' run. On November 5, 2014, Yung Berg was arrested for allegedly assaulting Masika, several hours after the taping of the reunion special. VH1 released a statement that he had been terminated from the show effective immediately. On December 11, 2015, Masika announced that she was expecting a child with rapper Fetty Wap. After a season's absence, Masika returned to the show as a main cast member in season three, which chronicled the birth of her daughter, Khari Barbie Maxwell, and her subsequent co-parenting struggles with Fetty. Masika was demoted to the supporting cast in season four, amid tensions with the show's producers, allegedly due to her refusal to film with new cast member Alexis Skyy. Skyy is Fetty's ex-girlfriend, who was in a long-term relationship with Fetty when Masika fell pregnant. The season revealed scenes of Kalysha breaking the fourth wall several times to express her displeasure with producers, as well as threatening legal action and storming off set. The feud became the season's leading storyline, with Masika, Moniece and Misster Ray pitted against Alexis, Hazel, Nikki, Zellswag and Lyrica in a series of brawls. Masika quit the show after the season's reunion special, unhappy with her portrayal on the show. Masika also appears in the special Dirty Little Secrets. In 2018, she appeared on We TV's Growing Up Hip Hop: Atlanta with fellow Love & Hip Hop alumni Deb Antney and Jhonni Blaze.
- Princess Love (Seasons 3–6, supporting cast member in season 2, guest star in season 1) is a model, video vixen and fashion designer. She was born in Oakland, California and raised in Austin, Texas. She is an Afro-Asian of mixed ethnicity, her mother is Filipino, while her father is African-American. She initially came into the public eye for dating and allegedly robbing boxer Floyd Mayweather Jr while working as a stripper at the Spearmint Rhino in Las Vegas. She began dating Ray J in 2013. Princess first appears as a guest star in season one, which chronicles her relationship struggles with Ray, while feuding with his ex, Teairra. In one memorable scene, Ray pushes her into a pool during an argument. At the reunion, she gets into a physical brawl with Ray's former assistant, Morgan. Princess joins the supporting cast in season two, which chronicles the aftermath of her 2015 arrest for alleged domestic violence against Ray. She initially tries befriending Teairra, before the two have a violent falling out. Princess and Ray eventually reconcile, and when he proposes to her in the season finale, she accepts. Princess is promoted to main cast in season three. Her wedding ceremony is featured in the season finale. Although credited in every episode of season four, she appears infrequently, her storyline revolving around her struggle to get pregnant. She is successful in season five, and the couple welcome their first child, Melody Love Norwood, in the special Ray J & Princess: Labor of Love. In season six, she announces that she is pregnant with their second child. Princess also appears in the specials The Wedding, Dirty Little Secrets and The Love Edition.

=== Season 4 additions ===
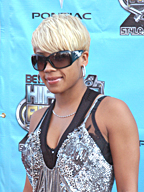
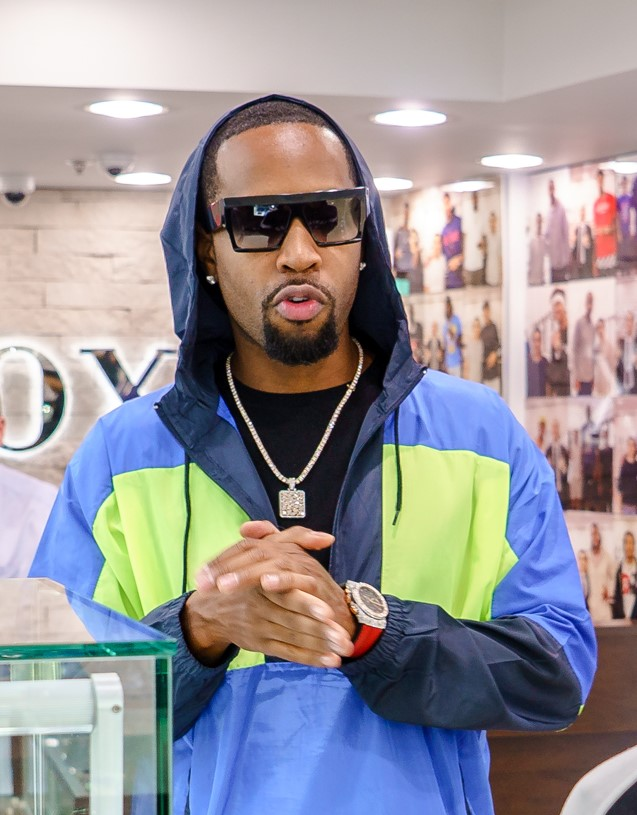
Keyshia Cole (top) and Safaree Samuels (below) join the main cast of Love & Hip Hop: Hollywood in season four.
- Keyshia Cole (Season 4), born Keyshia Myeshia Johnson, is a Grammy Award-nominated R&B singer-songwriter. She was born in Oakland, California. She has released six albums, all of which have reached the top ten on the Billboard 200, and previously starred in the BET reality shows Keyshia Cole: The Way It Is, Keyshia & Daniel: Family First and Keyshia Cole: All In. She married former NBA player Daniel "Booby" Gibson in 2011, and the couple share a son, Daniel Hiram Gibson Jr., born in 2010. Keyshia joins the cast in season four, which chronicles her return to the music industry and the recording of her seventh album, 11:11 Reset. During the season, she finalises her divorce to Booby. Keyshia was reportedly paid $1.5 million for her time on the show. Keyshia also appears in season six of Love & Hip Hop: New York, where she is seen attending Remy Ma and Papoose's wedding as a bridesmaid.
- Lyrica Anderson (Seasons 4–6, supporting cast member in season 3) is a R&B singer-songwriter. She is well known in the industry for her songwriting, having penned singles for high-profile artists such as Beyoncé and Tinashe. Her mother, Lyrica Garrett, is a former Ikette. Lyrica joins the supporting cast in season three with her boyfriend, producer A1 Bentley. The series chronicles their relationship struggles, including their relationships with their mothers, who constantly interfere in their lives. During the season, the couple elope. Lyrica is promoted to main cast in season four, which chronicles the recording of her second album, Adia, inspired by the death of her twin sister, who died when she was three. Her and A1's marriage is thrown into turmoil in season five, when rumours swirl around her infidelity, and claims by K. Michelle that she had pursued an affair with Safaree Samuels. After a brief separation, and getting into a series of altercations with family and friends over the scandal, the couple eventually reconcile when she discovers that she is pregnant. On November 30, 2018, Lyrica and A1 welcomed their first child, Ocean Zion Bentley. Season six chronicles their ongoing relationship struggles, including A1's infidelity with Summer Bunni. Lyrica also appears in the specials The Love Edition and Dirty Little Secrets.
- Safaree Samuels (Season 4, supporting cast member in season 3, guest star in season 5) is a Jamaican-American rapper and record producer, originally from Brooklyn, New York. He came into the public eye through his relationship with Nicki Minaj, whom he dated from 2002 until 2014. He previously appeared as a guest star in three episodes of the spin-off show K. Michelle: My Life. Safaree joins the supporting cast in season three, which chronicles his struggles to reinvent himself and launch his own music career after a very public break up. He begins dating Nikki, however their romance fizzles out when he discovers she has been seeing another woman behind his back. The season also features his business ventures, including the launch of his coconut oil line. He is promoted to main cast in season four, where he gets more involved in the antics of his friends Ray J and A1, calling themselves the "three amigos". During the season, he helps kickstart Chanel West Coast's music career. During the season's reunion special, Safaree announced that he was leaving the show to join the cast of Love & Hip Hop: New York. He would appear as a supporting cast member in season eight, before joining the main cast in season nine. He returned to Love & Hip Hop: Hollywood as a guest star in season five, after being accused of having an affair with Lyrica, igniting a feud with A1. Safaree also appears as a supporting cast member on season two of Leave It to Stevie, as a guest star in Remy & Papoose: Meet the Mackies and in the specials Dirty Little Secrets, The Love Edition, Love & Hip Hop Awards: Most Certified and 40 Greatest Love & Hip Hop Moments: The Reboot. He also appeared as a contestant on VH1's Scared Famous with Nikki and other Love & Hip Hop franchise cast members.

=== Season 5 additions ===
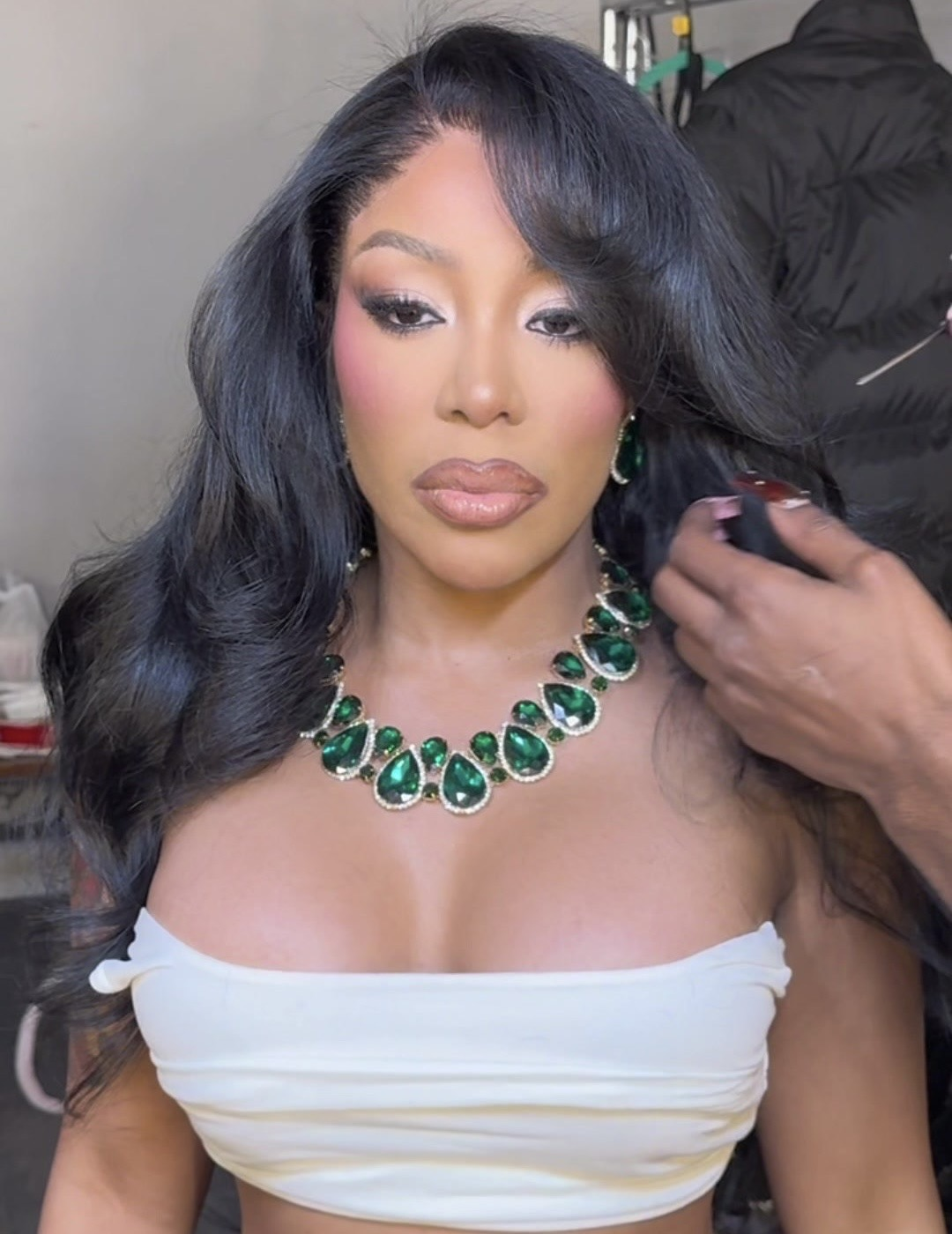
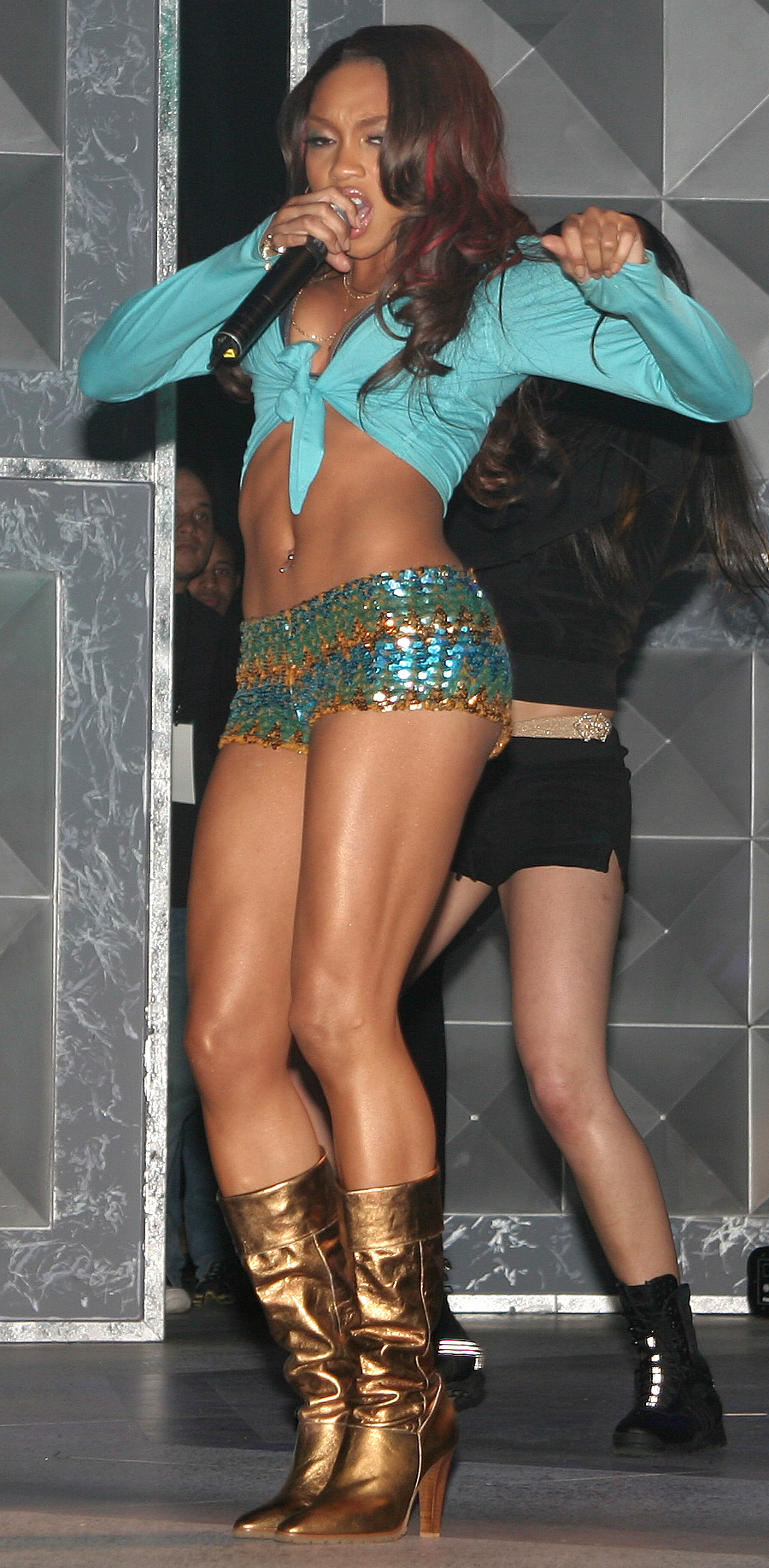
K. Michelle (top) and Brooke Valentine (below) join the main cast of Love & Hip Hop: Hollywood in season five.
- K. Michelle (Seasons 5–6), born Kimberly Michelle Pate and credited onscreen as Kimberly, is a R&B/soul singer-songwriter, originally from Memphis, Tennessee. She appeared as a main cast member on seasons one, two and five of Love & Hip Hop: Atlanta, and is one of the show's original six cast members, dubbed its breakout star. She also starred in season four of Love & Hip Hop: New York and in three seasons of her own spin-off series, K. Michelle: My Life. Kimberly joins the cast in season five, making her the only person in the franchise's history to appear in three incarnations of Love & Hip Hop as a main cast member. She comes into conflict with Lyrica and A1 after she exposes Lyrica's alleged infidelity with her friend Safaree. Later, she confronts her former assistant and K. Michelle: My Life co-star Paris Phillips, pulling receipts regarding previous accusations she stole money from her. The season also explores her recent health scare, stemming from illegal buttock injections. Season six chronicles her plans to expand her family via a surrogate, as well as her venture into country music. Although credited in every episode, she appears infrequently and does not attend the season's reunion, instead announcing her return to Atlanta. Kimberly also appears as a guest star in the spin-off shows Love & Hip Hop Atlanta: After Party Live!, Stevie J & Joseline: Go Hollywood and Leave It To Stevie, and in the specials Dirty Little Secrets, 40 Greatest Love & Hip Hop Moments, Love & Hip Hop Live: The Wedding (where she performs live), Love & Hip Hop Awards: Most Certified (where she won the Clapback Queens category) and 40 Greatest Love & Hip Hop Moments: The Reboot.
- Brooke Valentine (Season 5, supporting cast member in season 4), born Kanesha Nichole Brookes, is a R&B singer, originally from Houston, Texas. She is best known for her 2005 Billboard Hot 100 hit single "Girlfight". She stepped back from the music industry to take care of her son, London, born in 2010, who has cerebral palsy. Brooke was reported as being part of the original cast in 2014, however any scenes she filmed were cut and never made it to air. She joins the supporting cast in season four, which chronicles her relationship struggles with rapper Marcus Black, and her friendship with Booby, which turns romantic during the course of the season. Brooke is promoted to main cast in season five, having reaffirmed her commitment to Marcus and now pressuring him into marriage. After surprising him with a wedding ceremony, he officially proposes and the two are engaged. On February 24, 2019, it was reported that Brooke and Marcus had secretly married. On May 13, 2019, the couple announced the birth of their first child together, Chí Summer Black. On July 13, 2019, Brooke confirmed that she would not be returning to the show, deciding it was best to "take a break" to instead raise her child.
- A1 Bentley (Seasons 5–6, supporting cast member in seasons 3–4), born Floyd Eugene Bentley III, is a record producer, songwriter and rapper, originally from Kansas City, Kansas. He has produced and written singles for high profiles artists such as Chris Brown and Ty Dolla $ign. He also known for his distinctive style; blonde dreads, black nail polish and pearls. A1 joins the supporting cast in season three with his girlfriend, Lyrica Anderson. The series chronicles their relationship struggles, including their relationships with their mothers, who constantly interfere in their lives. During the season, the couple elope. Season four chronicles the launch of his record label, Right Now Sound, with business partner Prince Chrishan, and the behind-the-scenes tensions while recording Lyrica's second album, Adia. A1 is promoted to main cast in season five. His marriage to Lyrica is put to the test when K. Michelle accuses her of being unfaithful, causing him to lash out violently at his former friends Safaree and Ray J, and even his mother Pam and brother Lloyd, who accuse him of going "Hollywood". After a brief separation, he reconciles with Lyrica when she discovers that she is pregnant. On November 30, 2018, Lyrica and A1 welcomed their first child, Ocean Zion Bentley. Their marriage is again thrown into turmoil in season six when A1 is accused of cheating on Lyrica with model Summer Bunni. A1 also appears in the specials Dirty Little Secrets, The Love Edition, Love & Hip Hop Awards: Most Certified (where he won in the Gold Medal Moves category) and 40 Greatest Love & Hip Hop Moments: The Reboot.

=== Season 6 additions ===
- Yo-Yo (Season 6), born Yolanda Whitaker, is a Grammy Award-nominated rapper, actress and community activist from Compton, California. She came into the public eye as the protégé of gangsta rapper Ice Cube and through their collaborations, most notably "It's a Man's World" on his 1990 debut album AmeriKKKa's Most Wanted. She has two daughters, Tiffany and Sanai from previous relationships. She married former Michigan Mayor DeAndre Windom in 2013. Yo-Yo joins the cast in season six, which chronicles the launch of her performing arts school Yo-Yo's School of Hip Hop, aimed to help underprivileged youth. During the season, she takes aspiring rappers Apple Watts and Micky Munday under her wing.

== Supporting cast members ==
=== Original cast members ===
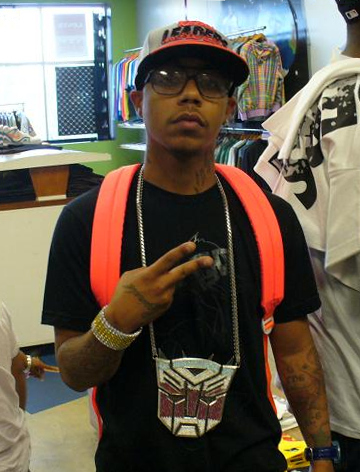
Yung Berg is one of the original supporting cast members on Love & Hip Hop: Hollywood.
- Morgan Hardman (Season 1) is Ray J's assistant and close friend of over decade. She is a single mother with a son, LaCorey Johnson, from a previous relationship, born in 2003. During the season, she has a dramatic falling out with Ray J, after she repeatedly gets involved in the feud between the two women in his life, Teairra and Princess. The season ends with the two severing their friendship and working relationship for good.
- Nia Riley (Seasons 1–4, guest star in season 6) is Soulja Boy's girlfriend, who she has been dating on-and-off since 2006. She is a model, brand ambassador and socialite. Her father is Grammy Award-winning singer Teddy Riley. She has a daughter, Kamyrn, from a previous relationship, born in 2013. The first season chronicles her struggles with Soulja's infidelity and commitment issues. During the season, she suffers a miscarriage while he is away on tour. In season two, Soulja has a fling with her former best friend Nas, igniting several violent brawls between the two girls. Although it is not revealed at any point onscreen, Nia and Soulja broke up while filming season three, with Soulja being fired from the show after threatening to kill her on social media. Nia would continue to appear on the show as a friend and confidante to the other girls, but in more of a background role, with only one green screen appearance in season four and no storyline of her own. A storyline involving a possible romance with Lil' Fizz was filmed but left on the cutting room floor. Nia does not attend the fourth season reunion, eventually disappearing from the show altogether without any on-screen explanation. She returns briefly in the special Ray J & Princess' Labor of Love, while attending Princess' baby shower party, and in one episode of season six, while attending Apryl and Fizz's housewarming party. Nia and Soulja also appear in We TV's Marriage Boot Camp: Hip Hop Edition with Fizz and Tiffany and several other Love & Hip Hop franchise cast members.
- Leslie Burrell (Season 1) is Omarion's mother. She raised Omarion in Inglewood, California with his father, Trent Grandberry. She is also the mother of the R&B singer O'Ryan with Vic Browner, Amira Chantal and Arielle Yasmin with Ozz Saturné, and has several grandchildren, including Namiko Love Browner, O'Ryan's daughter with singer-songwriter Jhené Aiko. She works as a hair stylist, and was also her son's stylist while he was performing in B2K. Leslie appears in a minor supporting role in the first season, which chronicles her strained relationship with her daughter-in-law, Apryl. At the season six reunion, it is alleged that she had a sexual encounter with her son's B2K group mate J-Boog, and this is one of the reasons the group broke up in 2003.
- Amanda Secor (Season 1) is Lil' Fizz's girlfriend of the past two years. She is an aspiring fashion designer, born and raised in Porter Ranch, Los Angeles by Egyptian parents. During the first season, she clashes with his baby mama Moniece, culminating in an altercation in which Moniece drags her across a table by her hair. Her and Fizz break up later in the first season due to her infidelity, having allegedly cheated on him repeatedly with a man known as "Mr. Miami" (reportedly NFL star Jonathan Dowling).
- Yung Berg (Season 1), born Christian Howard Ward and also known as Hitmaka, is a Grammy Award-nominated rapper and record producer, originally from Chicago, Illinois. He was raised by an African American father and a Puerto Rican mother. He rose to fame in 2007, with the Billboard Hot 100 hit singles "Sexy Lady" and "Sexy Can I" with Ray J. Berg was originally cast with Bow Wow's baby mama Joie Chavis as a couple, before Joie was fired three months into taping. Berg was then weaved into a storyline with Hazel-E, a relationship he later claimed was contrived for television. Berg is introduced as Hazel-E's love interest, who refuses to acknowledge their relationship as anything more than casual sex. He later pursues a relationship with Masika, igniting a feud between the two girls that would last the rest of the series' run. During the season, he also helps Teairra Marí get her career back on track, collaborating on the single "Deserve". At the first season's reunion special, he claims to have received oral sex from Teairra, which she denies. On November 5, 2014, Berg was arrested for allegedly assaulting Masika, several hours after the taping of the reunion special. VH1 released a statement that he had been terminated from the show effective immediately. On December 8, 2014, series creator Mona Scott-Young expressed regret for the firing, saying it was a network decision. The reunion aired with a public service announcement about domestic violence, along with a statement by VH1 condemning Berg's actions.
- Yesi Ortiz (Season 1, guest star in seasons 3–4) is Morgan's friend and confidante. She is a DJ and radio personality at Power 106. She was born and raised in Orange County, California to Mexican immigrants. She is the foster mother of her sister's six children, raising them since their mother was incarcerated. During the first season, she gets dragged into the beef between Morgan and Ray J, culminating in an incident where an intoxicated Ray J is escorted out of her radio station by security. Yesi returns in a guest role in season three, where she interviews Safaree for her radio show, and in season four, where she hosts a showcase featuring the show's female cast members.
- Sincere Show (Season 1), born Vincent Coffey, is a nightclub promoter, events manager and performer, originally from Chicago, Illinois. Sincere appears in a minor supporting role in the first season, with connections to many of the show's cast members. During the season, he and Miss Diddy host a showcase for Teairra Marí, which goes poorly, with Teairra physically attacking him after he criticises her weight and singing ability.

=== Season 2 additions ===
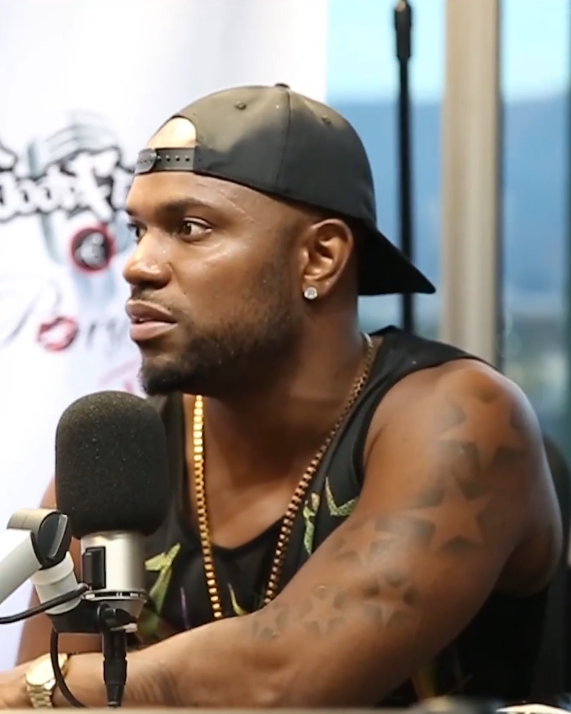
Milan Christopher joins the supporting cast in season two of Love & Hip Hop: Hollywood.
- Milan Christopher (Season 2) is a model, actor, rapper and underwear designer, originally from Chicago, Illinois. His uncle is married to Sherry Gordy, one of the daughters of Motown music mogul Berry Gordy, as such, he has also gone by the name Milan Christopher Gordy. He is openly gay and an activist within West Hollywood's LGBT scene. Milan joins the supporting cast in season two, which chronicles his struggles as a gay rapper in the homophobic hip hop industry. He has been dating down-low rapper Miles Brock for the past two years, and is tired of keeping their relationship a secret. During the season, Miles comes out, putting Milan into conflict with Miles' ex-girlfriend, Amber. At the season's reunion special, the couple have a dramatic break up on stage, with Milan accusing Miles of cheating on him. Milan was fired from the show for allegedly being difficult to work with. Milan later claimed his storyline was contrived for television and would criticise the show's producers for reinforcing gay stereotypes with its storylines involving Jason Lee, Zellswag and Misster Ray. In 2018, Milan was involved in Teairra Marí's sex tape scandal, being present when Teairra smashed her ex Akbar's car windows, and later filming himself in a violent confrontation with Akbar. Both incidents were recreated on camera without him in season five, with RoccStar in his place.
- Rich Dollaz (Season 2), born Richard Ashton Martin-Trowers is Moniece's boyfriend. He is a music executive and entertainment manager, originally from Waterbury, Connecticut. He is the CEO of Dollaz Unlimited, and began his career as an intern working in the promotional and marketing department at Bad Boy Records in New York City. He is a long-time supporting cast member on Love & Hip Hop: New York. Rich joins the supporting cast in season two, which chronicles his relationship struggles with Moniece, including a tense meeting with her mother Marla, who disapproves of their relationship. He breaks up with Moniece in the season finale, after she admits her lingering feelings for baby daddy Fizz. Rich would return to Love & Hip Hop: New York, eventually being promoted to main cast in season nine. He also appears in a supporting role in two episodes of season seven of Love & Hip Hop: Atlanta, in an episode of Love & Hip Hop Atlanta: After Party Live! and in the specials 40 Greatest Love & Hip Hop Moments, The Wedding, Love & Hip Hop Hollywood: Dirty Little Secrets, Love & Hip Hop New York: Dirty Little Secrets and The Love Edition.
- Amber Laura Hunter (Season 2), also known as Fabb Abb, is Miles' ex-girlfriend and high school sweetheart. She grew up in the San Fernando Valley. She started her music career as one part of the duo LisaRio with her sister Kellie Kelz. She has a daughter, Zoh'i.e., from a previous relationship, born in 2004. The second season chronicles her lingering feelings for Miles and her shock at his coming out as gay. Amber was fired from the show, later blaming Milan for his claims that she had faked their storyline.
- Miles Brock (Season 2), also known as Siir Brock, is Milan's secret boyfriend of the past two years. He is a rapper, dancer, actor and model. He grew up in the West Coast in a religious household. He started his music career as part of the R&B group Marz Boiz. The second season chronicles his coming out story and his struggles to reveal his sexuality to his family and ex-girlfriend Amber. Miles and Milan were the first openly gay couple to be featured in the Love & Hip Hop franchise and several episodes featured public service announcements aimed to help viewers struggling with their sexual identity. On October 12, 2015, VH1 announced that Love & Hip Hop: Out in Hip Hop, a round-table discussion moderated by T. J. Holmes of ABC News and featuring Miles and Milan, would air on October 19, 2015. The special focused on the reality on being openly LGBT in the hip hop community, and coincided with the airing of the episode "Truth", in which Miles finally comes out to Amber. Miles does not return to the show after the season's reunion special, in which Milan accuses him of being unfaithful. The couple would continue to make headlines for their violent break up, including Miles' arrest for alleged assault and claims by Milan that their storyline was contrived for television. Miles would return in the specials Dirty Little Secrets and The Love Edition to discuss his time on the show.
- Brandi Boyd (Seasons 2–3) is a close family friend of the Norwoods for over a decade. She is an actress and rapper, and previously appeared as Ray J's best friend and advisor Lil' B on his dating show For the Love of Ray J. She is an Afro-Asian of mixed ethnicity, her mother is Korean, while her father is African-American. She is the goddaughter of Whitney Houston and appeared briefly in Bravo's Being Bobby Brown. She is married to producer Max Lux and is the mother of his son, Prince Brandus, born in 2013. She is a member of the rap duo Queenz and is signed to Nick Cannon's Ncredible label. Brandi joins the supporting cast in season two, which chronicles her marital struggles. In season three, she steals $27,000 from her child's college fund to open up a clothing store, Jhalaé Couture, in Inglewood. During the season, her feud with Moniece Slaughter intensifies, with Moniece exposing Brandi for being arrested in an altercation with one of Max's alleged side chicks, and Brandi helping uncover Moniece's alleged sex tape. Brandi does not return to the show after the third season's reunion special, in which Moniece reveals that Max recently fathered a child outside their marriage with an extra from the show. In 2017, Moniece claimed the couple were broke and living in South Carolina. In 2023, month of April, Brandi Boyd's son died
- Nastassia Smith (Season 2) is Nia's former best friend. She is a Jamaican-American urban model, video vixen and aspiring fashion designer, originally from Jamaica, Queens. During a meeting with Nikki and Teairra to discuss their respective fashion lines, she reveals that she has been dating Nia's boyfriend Soulja Boy for years. This sparks multiple altercations between the two women, with Soulja refusing to claim her as anything more than a casual fling. In a memorable scene, she vomits during an argument with Nikki.
- Kamiah Adams (Season 2) is Fizz's girlfriend. She is an actress and model, originally from Brussels, Belgium. She grew up in Compton, California and has mixed ethnicity, her mother is white and her father is Puerto Rican and African-American. She breaks up with Fizz early into the second season, after he offends her by calling her an "appetiser". Later, she gets into a physical altercation with Nikki, and mocks Fizz's bedroom skills to gossip blogger Jason Lee.
- Max Lux (Seasons 2–3), born Marcus Jorel Boyd, is Brandi's husband and the father of her son, Prince Brandus. He is a rapper and record producer. He is known in the industry as a ghostwriter for several high profiles artists, most notably Ray J, Marques Houston and Lil Wayne's Billboard Hot 100 hit single "How to Love". Max joins the supporting cast in season two, which chronicles his marital struggles, including a confrontation at the studio when he leaves his wedding ring at home. The couple's issues continue in season three, when Brandi steals money from their child's college fund to open up a clothing store, and he starts collaborating with Masika without her approval. Later, he gets involved in his wife's feud with Moniece, helping Brandi uncover Moniece's alleged sex tape.
- Jason Lee (Seasons 2–3, 6) is a gossip blogger, media personality and brand ambassador. He is openly gay and biracial and endured a rough childhood growing up in the foster care system in Stockton, California, as his mother battled drug addiction. He is editor-in-chief, founder and CEO of Hollywood Unlocked and hosts the radio show Hollywood Unlocked [UNCENSORED], where he has interviewed numerous Love & Hip Hop franchise cast members. Jason appears in a minor supporting role in season two as a friend of Kamiah, who exposes the details of her fling with Fizz. He quickly ignites a rivalry with Hazel-E after throwing a drink in her face during a heated argument. He returns in a larger role in season three, where he comes into conflict with Moniece and Fizz when he obtains a copy of her alleged sex tape. Jason initially left the show to focus on his broadcasting career. He returns in season six, after asking Apryl to join Hollywood Unlocked [UNCENSORED] as a co-host. During the season, he opens up about his past struggles, including the 1997 shooting death of his brother Rodney. Later, he fires Apryl from his show, and sides with Moniece in the feud between the two women.
- Marla Thomas (Season 2) is Moniece's mother. She is married to Dave Thomas, a Grammy Award-winning singer from the gospel group Take 6. Together, they host the radio show The Marla & Dave Show. Marla appears in a minor supporting role in season two, which chronicles her strained relationship with Moniece and her apprehensions about her relationship with Rich. She would later appear with Moniece on a 2017 episode of Dr. Phil titled My Son Thinks He's Engaged to Rihanna, Walks Around Town Naked and Believes He's Worth $700 Billion, to discuss her son, DJ, who suffers from mental health issues.
- Shanda Denyce (Seasons 2–3, guest star in season 6), born LaShanda Niyana Denyce Blatcher-Taylor, is Willie's wife and mother of his children, Kavion Madison, born in 2005, and Layla-Marie, born in 2010. She is a R&B singer-songwriter, originally from Chicago, Illinois. Prior to dating Willie, she worked as a stripper. Shanda joins the supporting cast in season two, which chronicles her marital struggles. When the two are faced with money issues, she debates whether to return to her former profession. Later, she begins dancing at Nikki's club, but stops after Willie finds out. In season three, her marriage is thrown into turmoil when she is confronted by Willie's alleged mistress, Kyesha, who claims to have been having sex with her husband for years. The revelation breaks up their marriage and Shanda moves out of the family home. Shanda eventually reconciled with Willie off camera and moved back to Chicago. In 2018, she gave birth to their third child, Kash Madison. Shanda and Willie return briefly in a guest role in season six, when they attend Apryl's dinner in Chicago.
- Willie Taylor (Seasons 2–3, guest star in season 6), is a R&B singer-songwriter, originally from Chicago, Illinois. He rose to fame as a member of the group Day26, which was formed at the end of season four of MTV's Making the Band. He married Shanda Denyce in 2007 and is the father of her children, Kavion Madison, born in 2005, and Layla-Marie, born in 2010. Willie joins the supporting cast in season two, which chronicles his attempts to revive his music career after several label and contract disputes, as well as his struggles to provide for his family. In season three, he is accused of cheating on his wife with Kyesha. He initially denies the affair, however eventually admits to being unfaithful. Willie eventually reconciled with Shanda off camera and moved back to Chicago. In 2018, they welcomed their third child, Kash Madison. Shanda and Willie return briefly in a guest role in season six, when they attend Apryl's dinner in Chicago.

=== Season 3 additions ===
- Sonja Norwood (Season 3, guest star in seasons 1, 3) is Ray J's mother, originally from McComb, Mississippi. She is also the mother of Brandy Norwood with her husband Willie Norwood, whom she married in 1975. She raised her children in Carson, California. She previously starred with her family in the VH1 "celebreality" show Brandy & Ray J: A Family Business, where she is also credited as an executive producer. Sonja first appears in a guest role in season one, where she meets with Teairra to discuss Teairra's lingering feelings for Ray. She appears in a minor supporting role in season three, where her strained relationship with Princess casts a shadow over their wedding plans. Sonja returns in a guest role in season five, which chronicles her and Brandy's feud with Princess, as they prepare for the birth of her grandchild. Her and Princess later bury the hatchet and she appears in the special Ray J & Princess' Labor of Love.
- Kyesha Shalina (Season 3), also known as KyRaQ, is Willie's mistress. She is a rapper, originally from Chicago, Illinois. Kyesha appears in a minor supporting role in season three, where she ignites a vicious feud with Shanda, after claiming to have been in a secret relationship with her husband Willie for over a decade. Midway through the season, the two get into a vicious brawl at an open mic night after Kyesha performs "MySpace", a diss track at Shanda.
- Lyrica Garrett (Seasons 3, 5–6, guest star in season 4), born Marcy Thomas, is Lyrica's mother. She is a singer-songwriter and vocal coach, originally from Dallas, Texas. She was discovered by Ike Turner, performing with The Ikettes from 1974 until 1975, and again in 1988, and touring with him in 2006. She is the aunt of actresses La'Myia Good and Meagan Good. Lyrica joins the supporting cast in season three, which chronicles her strained relationship with A1 and his mother Pam. After multiple altercations between the two women, including an incident at a family picnic where she is gifted a waist trainer, her and Pam come to an understanding. She makes guest appearances in several episodes in season four, before returning in a supporting role in seasons five and six, where she again comes to blows with Pam after her daughter is accused of infidelity.
- Pam Bentley (Seasons 3, 5–6, guest star in season 4) is A1's mother, originally from Kansas City, Missouri. Pam joins the supporting cast in season three, which chronicles her strained relationship with Lyrica and her mother Lyrica Garrett. After multiple altercations between the two women, her and Lyrica Garrett come to an understanding. She makes guest appearances in several episodes in season four, before returning in a supporting role in seasons five and six. She again comes to blows with Lyrica Garrett after Lyrica is accused of infidelity, including a brawl where beach chairs are thrown. Pam also becomes more critical of A1 for going "Hollywood" and neglecting his family.
- Rosa Acosta (Season 3) is Nikki's girlfriend. She is a fitness model, video vixen and actress, originally from Santiago de los Caballeros, Dominican Republic. She previously appeared on the E! reality show Khloé & Lamar as a fling of Rob Kardashian. She is openly bisexual and has been previously linked to Amber Rose. Her romance with Nikki fizzles out when she discovers Nikki has been dating Safaree behind her back.

=== Season 4 additions ===
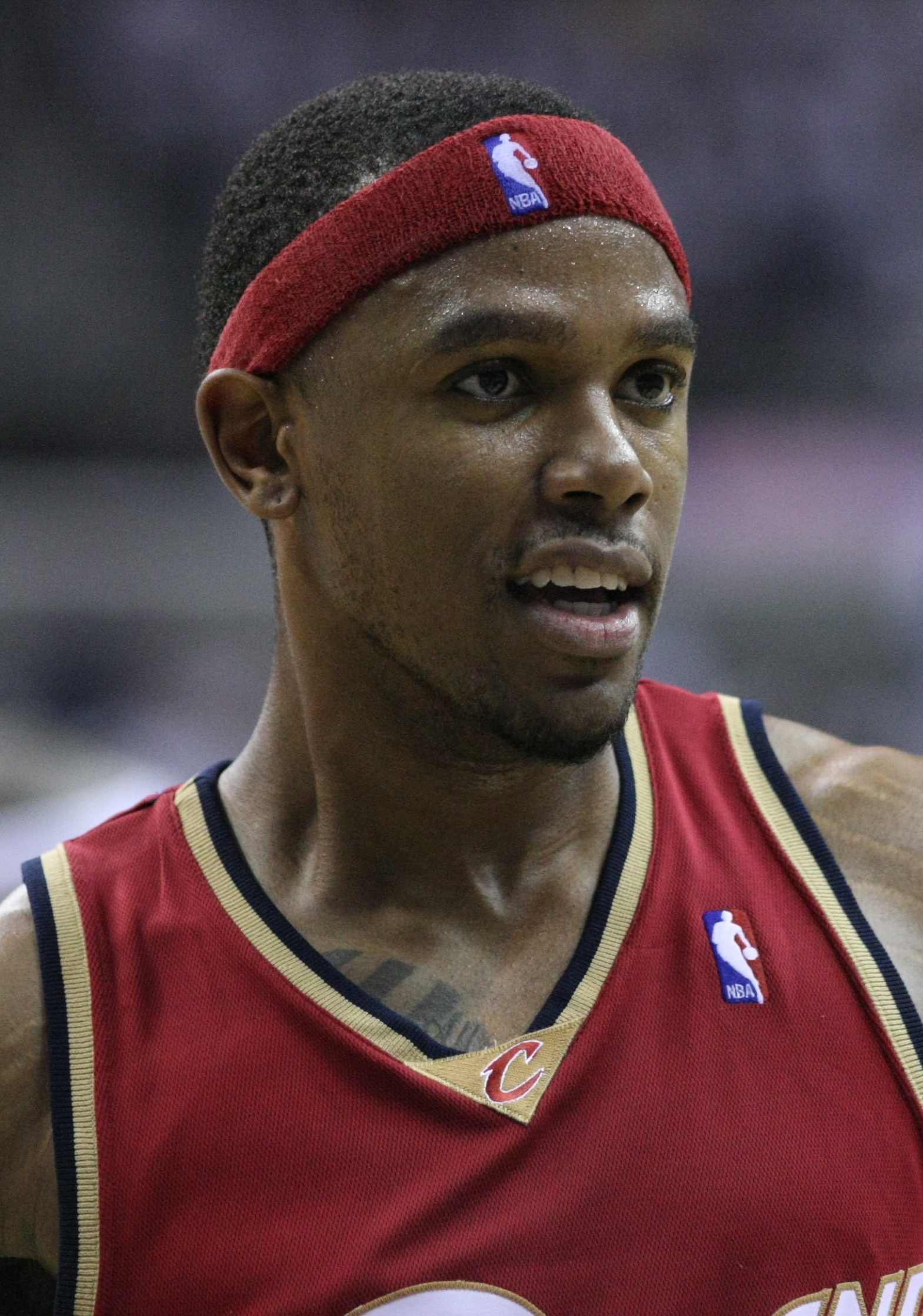
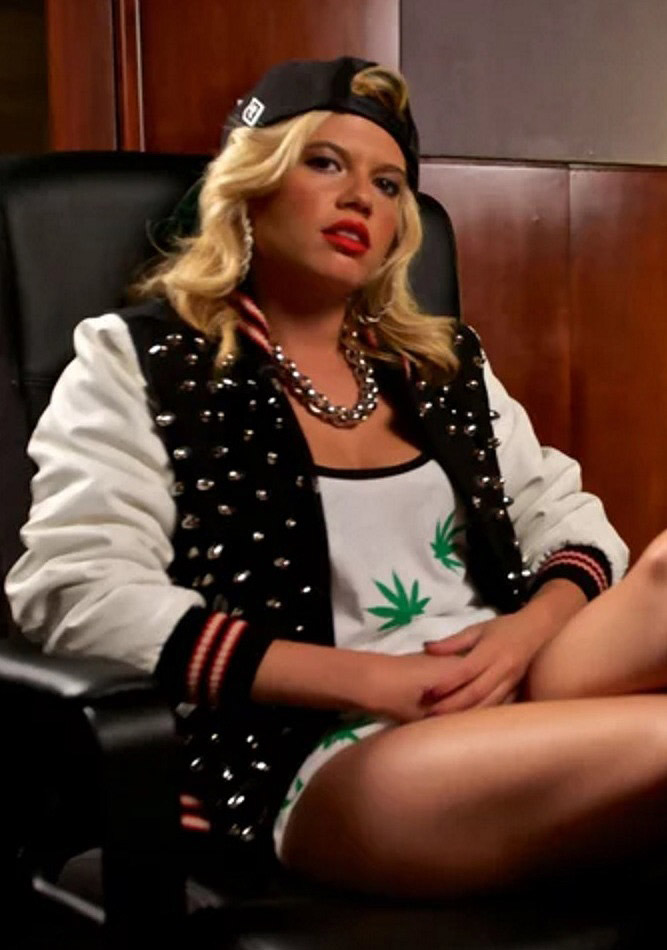
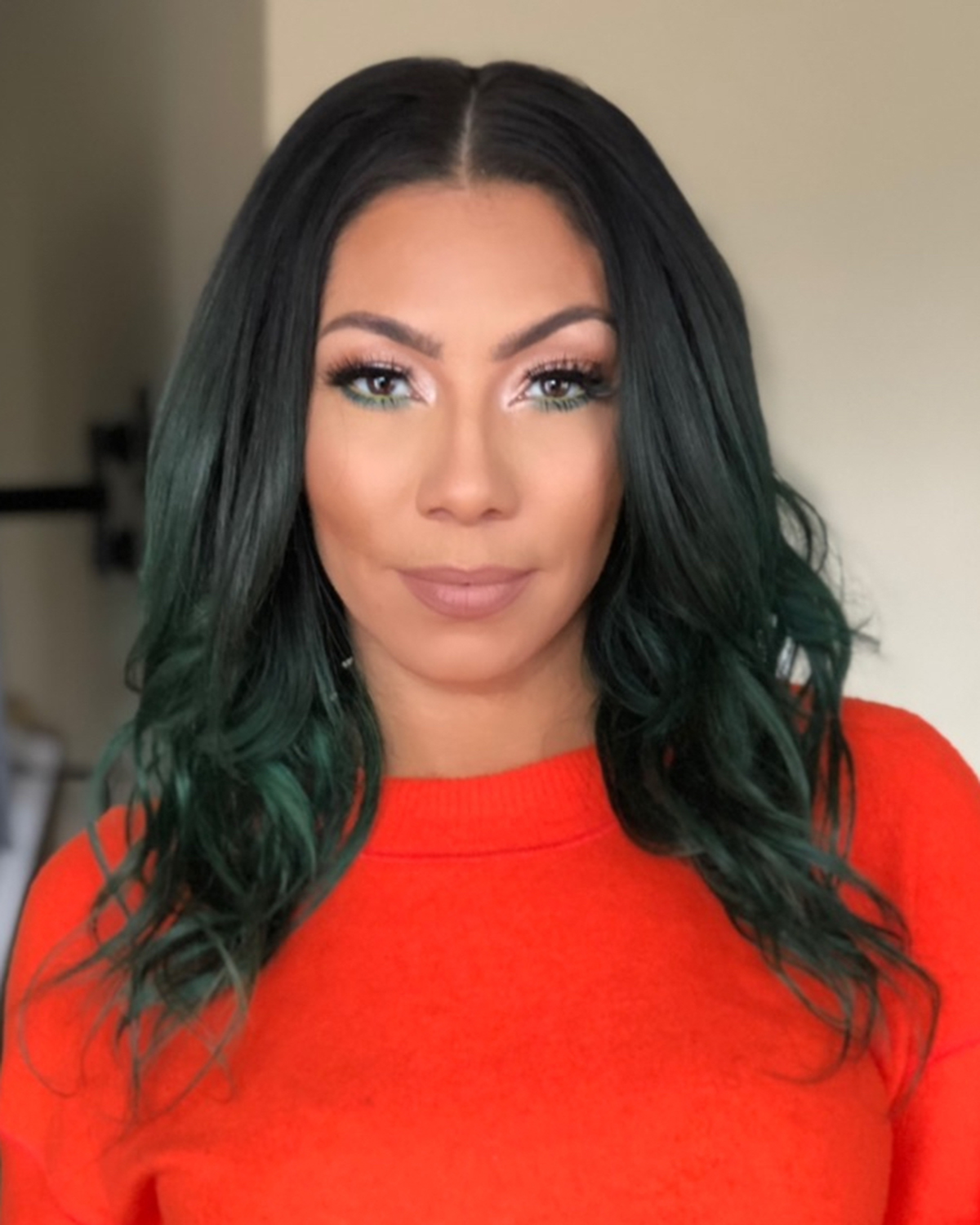
Daniel "Booby" Gibson, Chanel West Coast and Bridget Kelly join the cast of Love & Hip Hop: Hollywood in season four.
- Daniel "Booby" Gibson (Seasons 4, 6, guest star in season 5, cameo in season 2), is Keyshia's ex-husband and the father of her son, Daniel Hiram Gibson Jr., born in 2010. He is a retired NBA player and aspiring rapper, originally from Houston, Texas. Booby makes a cameo appearance in season two, where he is seen sitting alongside Rich Dollaz at a fashion show. He joins the supporting cast in season four, which chronicles his struggles with Keyshia as they attempt to finalise their divorce. During the season, his long time friendship with Brooke Valentine turns romantic, putting him into conflict with her boyfriend Marcus Black. Later in the season, he enjoys a casual fling with Bridget Kelly, causing tensions between her and Brooke. Booby returns in a guest role in season five, where he confronts Marcus over his alleged mistreatment of Brooke. He returns to the supporting cast in season six, where he first expresses an interest in Apryl Jones, before her relationship with Fizz is made public. Later, he enjoys a flirtation with Moniece and Teairra, causing tensions between the two women.
- Zellswag (Seasons 4, 6), born Rodney Lazell Shaw, is a sexually fluid and bisexual celebrity stylist, originally from Hamilton, Ohio. His clientele includes fellow Love & Hip Hop franchise cast members K. Michelle, Remy Ma and Keyshia Cole. He is a distant cousin of Teairra Marí and best friends with K. Michelle: My Life star Paris Phillips. Zell joins the supporting cast in season four, which chronicles his deteriorating friendship with Masika Kalysha, as he sides with Alexis Skyy in their bitter feud. During the season, he sparks a violent rivalry with Misster Ray, after it is revealed the two have been dealing with the same man, Vic the Leo. Later, he and Alexis embark on a rap career, releasing "Drippin", a diss track aimed at Masika. Zell was fired from the show shortly after the season's reunion special, after leaving Misster Ray bleeding in a violent assault. He would guest star on the VH1 show Basketball Wives, in a scene in which he criticises Jennifer Williams' "stinky breath" and make a cameo appearance on the special Ray J & Princess' Labor of Love, where he is seen attending Princess' baby shower with Paris. Zell returns to the supporting cast in season six. He buries the hatchet with Ray and the two become cordial, however he finds a new enemy in Brittany B. when he and Paris clash with her at an event. The season also chronicles the launch of his fashion line East Avenue and his music ventures, as well as his blossoming romance with a woman, model Star Divine.
- Marcus Black (Seasons 4–5), born Marcus Moody, is Brooke's longtime boyfriend. He is a rapper, originally from Chicago, Illinois. He is known in the industry as a songwriter, having written for Justin Bieber and collaborating frequently with The Game. Season four chronicles his relationship struggles with Brooke when she discovers that he is still legally married. The couple run into further issues when he starts an affair with paralegal Jade Wifey, and after Brooke's friendship with Booby turns romantic. In season five, Marcus has moved on and started dating Stassia Thomas, however he and Brooke eventually reconcile. After surprising him with a wedding ceremony, he officially proposes to Brooke and the two are engaged. Later in the season, he comes into conflict with old flame Amber Diamond, who claims that Marcus is still pursuing her behind Brooke's back, and Booby, who returns to win Brooke back. On February 24, 2019, it was reported that Brooke and Marcus had secretly married. On May 13, 2019, the couple announced the birth of their first child together, Chí Summer Black. On July 13, 2019, Brooke confirmed that the two would not be returning to the show, deciding it was best to "take a break" to raise their child.
- Alexis Skyy (Season 4), born Anastasia McFarland, is a Dominican-Jamaican urban model, socialite, video vixen and rapper, originally from Long Island, New York. She worked as a stripper in Atlanta and came into the public eye through her relationship with Fetty Wap. She is openly bisexual and previously made guest appearances on season six of Love & Hip Hop: Atlanta as Jessica Dime's date. Alexis joins the supporting cast in season four, which chronicles her move to Los Angeles and her bitter feud with Masika Kalysha, who fell pregnant by Fetty while he was in a long-term relationship with Alexis. The feud became the season's leading storyline, with Masika, Moniece and Misster Ray pitted against Alexis, Hazel, Nikki, Zellswag and Lyrica in a series of brawls. The season also focuses on her love life, including her brief relationship with Solo Lucci, which ends after she gets in a confrontation with his baby mama Sara Scott. Later in the season, she and Zell embark on a rap career, releasing "Drippin", a diss track aimed at Masika. At the season's reunion special, she announces that she is pregnant with Fetty's child.
- Chanel West Coast (Season 4), born Chelsea Chanel Dudley, is a rapper and television personality. Chanel rose to fame for her appearances on MTV's Rob Dyrdek's Fantasy Factory and as the co-host of MTV's Ridiculousness. She was previously signed as an artist to Young Money Entertainment under the mentorship of Lil Wayne. Chanel joins the supporting cast in season four, which chronicles her struggles to kickstart her music career and be taken seriously as an artist. During the season, she collaborates with Safaree Samuels and comes into conflict with Hazel-E when they try to work together. They later reconcile. Later in the season, she briefly dates Solo Lucci, sparking a confrontation with Alexis Skyy.
- Jade Wifey (Season 4), born Jade Watson, is Marcus' love interest. She is a Jamaican-Italian model and paralegal. She previously appeared in a minor supporting role as Rich Dollaz' girlfriend in season seven of Love & Hip Hop: New York. Jade appears in a minor supporting role in season four as Chanel West Coast's friend and confidante. It is quickly revealed that she is secretly dating Marcus Black while helping him finalise his divorce, putting her into conflict with his girlfriend Brooke.
- Solo Lucci (Seasons 4–5), born Michael Dorsey, is Alexis' boyfriend. He is a rapper, originally from Fort Worth, Texas. He moved to Atlanta in 2011 after surviving a trap house robbery where he was shot in his liver and lung and left in a coma for six days. Footage of him discussing the incident was later featured in the Jay-Z music video 4:44. He rose to fame with his cocaine-inspired anthem "Whip It". He has a son, Sir Honor Scott-Dorsey, with Sara Scott, born in 2016. Season four chronicles his romantic struggles as he juggles his new relationship with Alexis Skyy, with his obligations to his baby mama back home. Alexis breaks up with him midway through the season, after he disrespects her by calling her a "pass around". Later, he briefly dates Chanel West Coast. In season five, he comes into conflict with Nikki after he claims the two had a sexual tryst (which she denies). Solo also guest stars in two episodes of season nine of Love & Hip Hop: New York, in a confrontation with Alexis over the paternity of her child.
- Cisco Rosado (Season 4) is Teairra's boyfriend. He is a Puerto Rican music executive and record producer, originally from Brooklyn, New York. He previously appeared as a supporting cast member in seasons five, six and seven of Love & Hip Hop: New York. Cisco joins the supporting cast in season four as Teairra's new man. He comes into conflict with Moniece, Nia and Zell who disapprove of their relationship and accuse him of enabling her alcoholism. He and Teairra break up midway through the season after he cheats on her with model Amber Diamond. At the season's reunion special, he claims to have previously had sex with Nikki (which she denies). During a heated argument with Moniece, she reveals that he has already been fired from the show.
- A.D. Diggs (Seasons 4–5) is the Puerto Rican-Italian girlfriend of Moniece Slaughter, originally from Brooklyn, New York. She owns Diggs The Kicks, a unisex apparel and sneaker shop operating in Rancho Cucamonga, California. She is a lesbian and active within Los Angeles' LGBT scene. A.D. joins the supporting cast in season four, which chronicles her relationship struggles with Moniece as they move in together after six months of dating. During the season, Moniece clashes repeatedly with her best friend Tiffany, leading to a brief separation in which A.D. enjoys a flirtatious night with Alexis Skyy. The couple reconcile in the season finale. A.D. breaks up with Moniece during season five, unable to deal with the drama in her life. Subsequently, A.D. is phased out of the show and does not attend the season's reunion special, however Moniece reveals that A.D. is still in her life and the two are "figuring it out".
- Misster Ray (Seasons 4–6), born Myles Raymond Cunningham, is a PR professional, publicist, blogger and television personality, originally from Richmond, Virginia. He came into the public eye in 2006 as the first openly gay cast member on BET's College Hill: Virginia State University. Misster Ray joins the supporting cast in season four, which chronicles his violent rivalry with Zell, who Ray accuses of trying to steal away his boyfriend, Vic the Leo. He later get involved in the drama between Masika and Alexis Skyy, siding with Masika and Moniece against Alexis, Zell, Hazel-E, Nikki and Lyrica. Ray appears in a minor supporting role in season five, where he clashes with JayWill while trying to book him for a pride event. In season six, Ray buries the hatchet with Zell and the two become cordial, however he sparks a violent altercation with A1 when he overheard speculating on the paternity of his child. Ray also appears in the special 40 Greatest Love & Hip Hop Moments: The Reboot.
- Bridget Kelly (Seasons 4–5) is a Grammy Award-winning R&B singer-songwriter, originally from New York City, New York. She was raised in Chelsea, Manhattan by an Irish mother and Bahamian father. She rose to fame in 2008 when she signed to Roc Nation under the mentorship of Jay Z, and regularly filled in for Alicia Keys during live and television performances of his song "Empire State of Mind". Bridget joins the supporting cast in season four, which chronicles her relationship with James, her boyfriend of seven years, which becomes strained when she collaborates on a sexually charged track with Ray J. They break up midway through the season, and she enjoys a casual fling with Booby in Catalina, creating tensions between her and her close friend Brooke Valentine. Season five chronicles the launch of her debut album, Reality Bites, and her press tour in London, which she invites the ladies to come along.
- James Shipp Jr. (Season 4) is Bridget's on-again, off-again boyfriend of the past seven years. He is a biracial model, actor, singer and sports broadcaster, originally from Phoenix, Arizona. He is the brother of actress Alexandra Shipp. During the season, they break up after he disapproves of Bridget's new music direction with Ray J.
- Tiffany Campbell (Season 4, guest star in season 5) is AD's best friend, who disapproves of her relationship with Moniece. She is an aspiring model and actress. She has a son, Caleb Campbell, born in 2009. During filming, she was working as a stripper. Her and Moniece come to blows throughout season five. At the season's reunion special, she reveals that her and A.D. sexually experimented when she was 17, however she says it was "not her shit and that was that". She returns in a guest role in one episode of season five, where it is revealed that she has been dating Lil' Fizz. After another altercation with Moniece, she is not seen again. She filmed scenes for two additional episodes, however, her scenes were cut and released on VH1's website as bonus content. Tiffany also appears with Fizz on We TV's Marriage Boot Camp: Hip Hop Edition with Soulja Boy and Nia and several other Love & Hip Hop cast members.

=== Season 5 additions ===
- Apple Watts (Seasons 5–6), born Jontelle Lafaye Watts, is an urban model, video vixen and rapper. She endured a rough childhood growing up in the foster care system in South Central Los Angeles. She rose to fame as a stripper, which lead to a brief stint in pornography under the name Ms. Apple Bottom, and appearances in numerous hip hop music videos, most notably "Wicked" by Future. She has three children, Richard, Kali and Miyaki Watts, from previous relationships. Apple joins the supporting cast in season five, which chronicles her struggles to break out of stripping and into the music industry. During the season, she initially gets caught up in the rivalry between A1 and RoccStar, who both pursue her for a collaboration. She is briefly managed by Shun Love, before the two come to blows over her stripping. Later, her difficult relationship with her father John Watts is explored. She eventually cuts ties with him when a DNA test proves they aren't related, which he admits to already being aware of. In season six, Yo-Yo takes Apple under her wing, however things become strained when Apple ignites a feud with Summer Bunni, who she views as a clout chaser for meddling with Lyrica and A1's marriage.
- Paris Phillips (Seasons 5–6) is a socialite and actress, originally from Brooklyn, New York. She came into the public eye while working as a personal assistant for celebrities such as Keyshia Cole and K. Michelle. She previously appeared on season four of Love & Hip Hop: New York and on the spin-off show K. Michelle: My Life as K. Michelle's best friend and confidante, however they have a falling out after K accuses Paris of stealing money from her. Paris joins the supporting cast in season five as a friend and confidante to Princess, Teairra and the other women. She helps investigate and expose Teirra's new boyfriend Akbar's lies, leading to a violent confrontation with his "sister wives" Sade and Alejandra. She and Kimberly initially end their years-long feud, however later they get into a heated confrontation, with Paris throwing a drink in Kimberly's face after she pulls receipts of Paris' theft. Season six chronicles the antics of her and her best friend Zell after they spark a feud with Brittany B. after clashing with her at an event. Paris also appears in the specials Ray J & Princess' Labor of Love and 40 Greatest Love & Hip Hop Moments: The Reboot.
- Donatella Panayiotou (Season 5, guest star in season 4) is a broadcasting personality, creative consultant and events manager, originally from Shoreditch, United Kingdom. She came into prominence in London's grime scene while hosting for Grime Daily, and as a television presenter for MTV UK's The Wrap Up. In 2015, she garnered tabloid attention for allegedly dating NBA star Nick Young while he was engaged to rapper Iggy Azalea. Donatella makes guest appearances in season four as the manager of AngelGold, sister of Ty Dolla $ign. Later, she organises a performance showcase for the girls, leading to an incident where Masika drags Hazel-E off the stage, with Donatella memorably repeating "her wig is coming off". Donatella appears in a minor supporting role in season five, where she organises several events and showcases for the show's female cast members, and also provides an opportunity for JayWill to debut his drag persona, Kandie. After declining the cast's trip to London because of a prior work commitment, Donatella is phased out of the series and does not attend the season's reunion special.
- RoccStar (Season 5), born Leon Derrick Youngblood Jr., is a Grammy Award-nominated recording artist and record producer. He grew up in San Diego, California and is known in the industry for his songwriting, having written for high-profile artists such as Chris Brown and Post Malone. He has a son, Syhre Leon Youngblood, born in 2015. RoccStar joins the supporting cast in season five, which chronicles his rivalry with A1. During the season, he adds fuel to the fire by implying he has been having an affair with Lyrica. Later, he attempts to kickstart Amber Diamond's music career with disastrous results, putting him into conflict with her mother and manager Shun Love.
- La'Britney Franklin (Season 5) is a R&B singer, originally from Detroit, Michigan. She rose to fame with her single "Actin' Funny" featuring Kash Doll. She has two sons, Alontae, born in 2003, and Russell, born in 2007, who she had while she was still a teenager. La'Britney joins the supporting cast in season five, which chronicles her struggles to kickstart her music career. She pursues a collaboration with A1, putting her into conflict with his wife Lyrica. During the season, she falls out with her friend JayWill after taking his spot in a pride performance, however they later reconcile.
- JayWill (Season 5), born Curtis Williams III, is a rapper, comedian and social media personality. He grew up in Compton, California. He is openly bisexual and known for his drag persona, Kandie. JayWill joins the supporting cast in season five, which chronicles his struggles being taken seriously as an artist. During the season, he clashes with Misster Ray and La'Britney over a pride performance as he attempts to step outside his "Kandie" persona.
- Amber Diamond Erby (Season 5, guest star in season 4) is a model and television personality, originally from Chelsea, Alabama. She came into the public eye as a Wild 'n Out girl and as the co-host of MTV2's Binge Thinking with rapper Mac Lethal. She previously appeared on TLC's Raising Fame and Oxygen's Fix My Mom with her mother and manager, Shun Love. Amber first appears as a guest star in season four. She is dating Cisco, oblivious to the fact that he has a serious girlfriend, Teairra. The two women discover Cisco's betrayal during a heated confrontation at Joe Exclusive's clothing store, which ends with Teairra being dragged out by security after threatening to kill her. Amber joins the supporting cast in season five, which chronicles her musical ambitions and attempts to kickstart a singing career. She collaborates with RoccStar on a track, however he humiliates her at the single launch party by playing her unedited vocals. Later, she reveals that she had dated Marcus years prior, igniting a rivalry with his fiancée Brooke Valentine.
- Shun Love Anderson (Season 5), born Syniqua Sultan Love, is the mother and manager of Amber Diamond. She is an entertainment manager and entrepreneur, originally from Chelsea, Alabama. She previously appeared with Amber on TLC's Raising Fame and Oxygen's Fix My Mom. She had three kids by the age of 18 and has been married several times. Shun joins the supporting cast in season five, which chronicles her attempts to kickstart her daughter's music career. She pays RoccStar $20,000 for a track, but is horrified by the results. During the season, she takes Apple Watts under her wing, attempting to steer her away from stripping and street life. Later, she gets involved in her daughter's feud with Brooke Valentine and Bridget Kelly, culminating in a memorable altercation with Bridget in which she snatches her own daughter's wig and uses it as a weapon.
- John Watts (Season 5) is Apple's father. He is a memoirist and writer. He is known for his memoirs The Rollin '80's: Drugs, Money, Politics and Reality and Power of the V, written under the pseudonym John Boy. He endured a rough childhood growing up in South Los Angeles and started selling crack cocaine at the age of 12 in order to provide for his family. He has a long criminal history and has been in and out of prison since 1988 before turning his life around. He did not have a relationship with Apple after she was born, and Apple spent her childhood and teen years in the foster care system, however they reconnected six years ago. During the season, he tries to be more involved in her life. In the season's finale, Apple discovers from a DNA test that the two aren't actually biologically related (which he is already aware of) and subsequently cuts all ties with him.

=== Season 6 additions ===
- J-Boog (Season 6, guest star in season 4), born Jarell Damonté Houston, Sr., is a member of the R&B group B2K with Lil' Fizz and Omarion. He was born and raised in Compton, California. His cousin is Marques Houston, who he owns the production company Footage Films with. He has three children with ex-girlfriend Jondelle Michelle Lee, Anaia Jolie Houston, born 2005, Jarell Damonté Houston Jr., born 2006, and Tru Carter Houston, born 2009. J-Boog first appears as a guest star in season four, when Fizz attempts to get a B2K reunion off the ground. He is initially hesitant when Ray J gets involved and the two nearly get into a brawl. Boog joins the supporting cast in season six, which chronicles the backstage dramas of B2K's Millennium tour. Inspired by the experience and the potential financial earnings, he organises a reunion between the members of Immature/IMx and Ray J, and suggests they do their own tour together.
- Brittany B. (Season 6), born Brittany Chikyra Barber, is a Grammy Award-nominated recording artist and songwriter from Compton, California. Brittany joins the supporting cast in season six, which chronicles her musical ventures, including her help in launching Blac Chyna's music career. During the season, she reunites with her mother and forms a friendship with Apple Watts, while sparking violent feuds with Paris, Zell and Lyrica.
- Micky Munday (Season 6), born Justin Jacoby, is a rapper and actor. He grew up in South Central, California. He previously appeared as a contestant on NBC's 2003 show Fame and as Tommy "Whiteboy" James on the BET web series 8 Days a Week. He has a daughter, Jay'Lonna, born in 2009. He took his stage name from infamous cocaine trafficker Mickey Munday. Micky joins the supporting cast in season six, which chronicles his struggles to break into the hip hop industry as a white rapper. During the season, he is dating high fashion model Slick Woods, provoking a jealous reaction from his ex-girlfriend Tricia Ana.
- Tricia Ana (Season 6) is Micky's ex-girlfriend. She is an A&R of Akon's label Konvict Muzik. She is also one of Akon's wives, having married him in a private ceremony in Africa years ago. She has four children from previous relationships, and he has nine. Tricia joins the supporting cast in season six, which chronicles her lingering feelings for Micky.

== Guest stars ==
Several members of the cast's inner circle appear as recurring guest stars. They include:

Introduced in season 1

- Mally Mall, record producer, Nikki's boyfriend, cheats on her with Masika
- Michelle Mudarris, Nikki's mother, strip club owner, gets involved in Nikki and Masika's feud
- Miss Diddy, event planner, friend to Teairra and Brooke
- Teddy Riley, Nia's father
- Wack 100, Ray's manager
- Willie Norwood, Ray's father
- Brandy Norwood, singer, songwriter, Ray's sister
- Steve Mackey, vocal coach, Moniece's cousin

Introduced in season 2

- Screwface, Willie's manager
- Dr. Stacy Kaiser, Miles' psychotherapist, who helps him come out
- Angel Hunter-Brignac, Amber's sister
- Charmagne Gibson, Miles' sister

Introduced in season 3

- Fetty Wap, rapper, father of Masika and Alexis' children
- Diann Valentine, wedding planner, plans Ray and Princess' wedding
- Andrew Van Devon, make up artist, friend to Teairra

Introduced in season 4

- Rose Burgundy, Hazel's boyfriend
- Lorrie Moody, Marcus' mother
- Marquisha Miller, Keyshia's cousin
- Sara Scott, Solo's baby mama, Alexis' rival
- Vic the Leo, Misster Ray's boyfriend, former fling of Zell's
- AngelGold, singer, Ty Dolla Sign's sister, potential client of A1's

Introduced in season 5

- Stassia Thomas, Marcus's girlfriend, Brooke's rival
- Loyd Bentley, A1's brother, Pam's son
- Akbar Abdul-Ahad, Teairra's boyfriend, polygamist, alleged leaker of her sex tape
- Patrice Bentley, Loyd's wife, Pam's daughter-in-law
- Sade Abdul-Ahad, Akbar's wife, in a polyamorous relationship with Akbar and Alejandra
- Alejandra Perez, Akbar's girlfriend, in a polyamorous relationship with Akbar and Sade
- Melody Love Norwood, Ray J and Princess' daughter

Introduced in season 6

- Blac Chyna, model, entrepreneur, aspiring rapper, Brittany B.'s friend and confidante
- Tonai Canty, Kimberly's surrogate
- Sia Amun, Lyrica's friend, Brittany B.'s rival
- Summer Bunni, aspiring recording artist, A1's alleged mistress
- Slick Woods, supermodel, Micky Munday's girlfriend
- Marques Houston, recording artist, member of Immature/IMx, J-Boog's cousin
- Tiffany Haney & Sanai Whittaker, Yo-Yo's daughters
- Melyssa Ford & DJ Damage, Jason's co-hosts on Hollywood Unlocked
- Star Divine, model, Zell's girlfriend

The show also features minor appearances from notable figures within the hip hop industry and Los Angeles' social scene, including Snoop Dogg, Rick Ross, Lil Wayne, R. Malcolm Jones, Tiny, Nick Cannon, Big Boy, Bryan-Michael Cox, The Game, Anthony Hamilton, Jackie Long, Too $hort, Bobby Brown, Lisa Bloom, Lady Leshurr, Love & Hip Hop: Miami's Amara La Negra and Spectacular, Kash Doll, Lil' Ronnie, Kurupt, Love & Hip Hop: Atlanta's Yung Joc and Karlie Redd, T-Pain, Craig Smith, Akon, Eric Bellinger, Jerome Jones and Kelton Kessee of IMx, Dalvin Degrate, Kristian Bush, Black Ink Crew: Chicago's Ryan Henry, Big Mike, Asian Doll, Claude Kelly and Chuck Harmony of Louis York and Jess Hilarious.

Executive producer Mona Scott-Young hosted the first season reunion, subsequent seasons are hosted by Nina Parker.
