= Love & Hip Hop: Hollywood season 1 =

Love & Hip Hop: Hollywood
- Season 1
- Cover used by the iTunes Store
- Starring: Teairra Marí; Moniece Slaughter; Apryl Jones; Hazel-E; Ray J; Lil' Fizz; Omarion; Soulja Boy
- No. of episodes: 14

Release
- Original network: VH1
- Original release: September 15 – December 9, 2014

Season chronology
- Next → Season 2

The first season of the reality television series Love & Hip Hop: Hollywood aired on VH1 from September 15, 2014, until December 9, 2014. It was primarily filmed in Los Angeles, California. It is executively produced by Mona Scott-Young for Monami Entertainment, Toby Barraud and Stefan Springman for Eastern TV, and Susan Levison, Nina L. Diaz and Vivian Gomez for VH1.

The series chronicles the lives of several women and men in the Hollywood area, involved in hip hop music. It consists of 14 episodes, including a two-part reunion special hosted by Mona Scott-Young.

== Production ==
On August 18, 2014, VH1 announced Love & Hip Hop: Hollywood, the Los Angeles-based spin-off of Love & Hip Hop, would make its series premiere on September 15, 2014. On September 8, 2014, a 4-minute "super-trailer" was released, along with Meet the Cast of Love & Hip Hop: Hollywood, an 11-minute promo video featuring interviews with the cast. The series would star Ray J, Soulja Boy, Omarion and his girlfriend Apryl Jones, Lil' Fizz and his ex-girlfriend Moniece Slaughter, Teairra Marí and former celebrity publicist Hazel-E, with Ray's assistant Morgan Hardman, Teddy Riley's daughter Nia Riley, Fizz's girlfriend Amanda Secor, Yung Berg, radio personality Yesi Ortiz, club promoter Sincere Show, socialite Nikki Mudarris and video vixen Masika Kaylsha as supporting cast members. Although not mentioned in the initial cast announcement, Omarion's mother Leslie Burrell would also appear as a supporting cast member.

On November 5, 2014, Yung Berg was arrested for allegedly assaulting his girlfriend and fellow cast member Masika, several hours after the taping of the reunion special. VH1 released a statement that he had been terminated from the show effective immediately. On December 8, 2014, series creator Mona Scott-Young expressed regret for the firing, saying it was a network decision. The two-part reunion aired with a public service announcement about domestic violence, along with a statement by VH1 condemning Berg's actions.

== Synopsis ==
Hollywood, the city where fame is the game. In this town, perception is everything. But nothing is ever what it seems. Success isn't guaranteed, especially when it comes to love. For some, fame and fortune come easily, but so does temptation. There's always someone on the rise, looking to steal the spotlight. But with every thorn, comes a rose worth protecting. In Hollywood, fighting for love is a losing battle, when the heart you want has no desire to be won. And for others, a future in love is threatened by the past. Welcome to Hollywood, where only a chosen few get invited to the party. Cause it ain't all fair, in love and hip hop.

— Mona Scott-Young, opening monologue

== Cast ==
=== Starring ===
- Teairra Marí (14 episodes)
- Moniece Slaughter (10 episodes)
- Apryl Jones (12 episodes)
- Hazel-E (13 episodes)
- Ray J (13 episodes)
- Lil' Fizz (12 episodes)
- Omarion (12 episodes)
- Soulja Boy (11 episodes)

=== Also starring ===
- Morgan Hardman (10 episodes)
- Nia Riley (11 episodes)
- Leslie Burrell (8 episodes)
- Amanda Secor (9 episodes)
- Nikki Mudarris (11 episodes)
- Yung Berg (10 episodes)
- Masika Kalysha (13 episodes)
- Yesi Ortiz (6 episodes)
- Sincere Show (9 episodes)

Princess Love, producer Mally Mall and Nikki's mother Michelle Mudarris appear as guest stars in several episodes. The show also features minor appearances from notable figures within the hip hop industry and Hollywood's social scene, including Miss Diddy, Teddy Riley, Ray's manager Wack 100, Willie Norwood, Sonja Norwood, Brandy Norwood, Moniece's cousin Stevie Mackey, Snoop Dogg and Rick Ross.

== Episodes ==
No. overall	No. in season	Title	Original release date	US viewers (millions)
1	1	"La La Land"	September 15, 2014	2.80
Teairra tries to hold on to her undying love for Ray, only to find that some things are best left in the past. Soulja Boy and Nia decide to build a future together. Omarion and Apryl are expecting their first child.
2	2	"Ex'd Out"	September 22, 2014	2.37
Nikki seeks answers after discovering that her boyfriend has shacked up with another woman. Hazel puts her relationship with Yung Berg on the line and Teairra casts doubt on their union. Masika, Nikki, Yung Berg, Amanda and Yesi join the supporting cast. Although credited, Omarion does not appear.
3	3	"Moving On"	September 29, 2014	2.28
Teairra tries to put an end to her love of Ray J but it opens up a box of hurt. Hazel and Teairra prove that friendships in Hollywood are only an illusion. Apryl and Omarion try to reconcile with his mother but Leslie's disdain for Apryl runs deep.
4	4	"Claim Game"	October 6, 2014	2.18
Soulja tries to salvage his relationship with Nia. Hazel sees Berg's true colors. Fizz wants something that Amanda cannot give him. Leslie steals the spotlight at Apryl's baby shower. A spa day at Morgan's home brings Nikki and Masika face to face. Although credited, Moniece and Ray do not appear.
5	5	"Truth Be Told"	October 13, 2014	2.39
Omarion finds himself having to choose between his mother or the mother of his child. Teairra launches her musical comeback with Berg, causing Hazel to spiral out of control. Ray J questions Morgan's loyalty. Although credited, Fizz and Soulja do not appear.
6	6	"Exit Stage Left"	October 20, 2014	2.25
When Nikki has second thoughts over Mally Mall's fidelity, an interrogation exposes the truth. Fizz catches Amanda in a compromising position. Ray is forced to choose between business and family. Sincere Show joins the supporting cast. Although credited, Moniece, Apryl, Hazel and Soulja do not appear.
7	7	"Busted"	October 27, 2014	2.33
Teairra cements her musical marriage with Berg while Hazel vies desperately for his acceptance in one final showdown. Soulja comes face to face with Nia's dad for a life altering evaluation. Although credited, Moniece does not appear.
8	8	"Dissed and Dismissed"	November 3, 2014	2.44
Masika cozies up to Berg, igniting a fire in Hazel. Ray J tries to move forward after his arrest. Nikki is ambushed with the discovery that Masika is the face of her friend's strip club. Although credited, Apryl, Omarion and Soulja do not appear.
9	9	"Face the Music"	November 10, 2014	2.30
Masika's billboard causes tensions to flare with Nikki and Hazel. Fizz fails to juggle the drama between Moniece and Amanda. Apryl and Omarion get ready for parenthood.
10	10	"Gossip Girl"	November 17, 2014	2.74
Masika and Berg advance their relationship, leaving Hazel enraged. Nia drops a bombshell that could change her relationship with Soulja for good. Apryl settles into motherhood, causing issues with her own mother to surface. Although credited, Fizz and Moniece do not appear.
11	11	"Treading Water"	November 24, 2014	2.59
Nia receives devastating news that will change the course of her relationship for good. Hazel and Teairra attempt to mend their broken friendship. Fizz tries to move forward, only for Moniece to bring him back down in an all out brawl.
12	12	"Matters of the Heart"	December 1, 2014	2.55
Fizz and Moniece try to mend their relationship for the sake of their son. Omarion gets back to making music with his mentor Rick Ross. Hazel confronts Masika in one final showdown. Teairra prepares for a career-defining performance.
13	13	"Reunion – Part 1"	December 8, 2014	2.63
The cast reunites and discuss explosive moments from Season 1. Tension rises from Nikki, Masika, Yung Berg and Mally Mall. host: Mona Scott-Young
14	14	"Reunion – Part 2"	December 9, 2014	2.07
The drama continues when Nikki and Masika face-off. An altercation between Princess and Morgan spirals dangerously out of control. host: Mona Scott-Young

== Music ==
Several cast members had their music featured on the show and released singles to coincide with the airing of the episodes.

List of songs performed and/or featured in Love & Hip Hop: Hollywood season one
Title	Performer	Album	Episode(s)	Notes	Ref
Giuseppe's	Soulja Boy	King Soulja 2	1	performed onstage	
Na U Kno	Hazel-E	single	2	performed in rehearsal space	
Hustlin'	Soulja Boy	King Soulja 3	2, 11	performed in rehearsal space played in studio session	
Kiss My Butterfly	Teairra Marí	unreleased	3	performed in studio session	
ATM (feat. Dria & Migos)	Ray J	single	5	featured in music video shoot	
Touch Me	Teairra Marí	unreleased	6	performed onstage	
Deserve (feat. Yung Berg)	Teairra Marí	single	7, 8, 12	performed in studio session and onstage	
Never Shoulda Did That	Ray J	single	7	played in studio session	
Famous (feat. Fresco Kane)	Lil' Fizz (as Fizz)	single	12	performed in studio session	
Post to Be (feat. Chris Brown & Jhené Aiko)	Omarion	Sex Playlist	12	played in studio session	
