= Love & Hip Hop: Hollywood season 3 =

Love & Hip Hop: Hollywood
- Season 3
- Cover used by the iTunes Store
- Starring: Moniece Slaughter; Teairra Marí; Nikki Mudarris; Masika Kalysha; Princess Love; Lil' Fizz; Soulja Boy; Ray J
- No. of episodes: 14

Release
- Original network: VH1
- Original release: August 15 – November 14, 2016

Season chronology
- ← Previous; Season 2 Next → Season 4

The third season of the reality television series Love & Hip Hop: Hollywood aired on VH1 from August 15, 2016 until November 14, 2016. It was primarily filmed in Los Angeles, California. It is executively produced by Mona Scott-Young and Stephanie Gayle for Monami Entertainment, Toby Barraud, Stefan Springman, Mala Chapple, David DiGangi, Michael Lang and Gilda Brasch for Eastern TV, and Nina L. Diaz and Vivian Gomez for VH1.

The series chronicles the lives of several women and men in the Hollywood area, involved in hip hop music. It consists of 14 episodes, including a two-part reunion special, hosted by Nina Parker.

== Production ==
The cast of the third season, from top left to bottom right: Masika, Fizz, Moniece, Nikki, Princess, Ray J, Soulja Boy and Teairra.

The third and fourth season title screen.

On August 3, 2016, VH1 announced that Love & Hip Hop: Hollywood would be returning for a third season on August 15, 2016. This season featured an entirely new opening credits sequence. It saw the promotion of long time supporting cast members Nikki Mudarris and Princess Love to the main cast, as well as the return and promotion of Masika Kalysha to main cast after a season's absence. Producer Floyd "A1" Bentley, his wife Lyrica Anderson, Lyrica's mother Lyrica Garrett, A1's mother Pam Bentley, Nicki Minaj's ex Safaree Samuels and fitness model Rosa Acosta joined the supporting cast. Ray J's mother Sonja Norwood and Willie's alleged mistress Kyesha Shalina would appear in minor supporting roles. Former main cast member Hazel E would return late into the season in a supporting role.

On August 19, 2016, Soulja Boy posted a video of himself on social media, brandishing a gun and threatening to kill Nia Riley and her alleged new boyfriend. From the third episode "For the Love of Money" onwards, Soulja was removed from the opening credits and had nearly all of his scenes deleted, essentially being reduced to a background extra on the two remaining episodes he did appear. On October 4, 2016, Soulja posted "I've decided to quit Love & Hip Hop. I feel my brand is too big for the show now. It's too ratchet." Series creator Mona Scott-Young responded by reposting a meme with the caption "If I ever get fired, I'm gone (sic) tell people I quit to protect my brand".

== Cast ==
=== Starring ===
- Moniece Slaughter (10 episodes)
- Teairra Marí (11 episodes)
- Nikki Mudarris (14 episodes)
- Masika Kalysha (9 episodes)
- Princess Love (13 episodes)
- Lil' Fizz (7 episodes)
- Soulja Boy^{1} (4 episodes)
- Ray J (13 episodes)

Note:

1. Removed from opening credits after episode 2.

=== Also starring ===
- Sonja Norwood (5 episodes)
- Brandi Boyd (13 episodes)
- Nia Riley (11 episodes)
- Shanda Denyce (11 episodes)
- Willie Taylor (9 episodes)
- Kyesha Shalina (4 episodes)
- Max Lux (11 episodes)
- Jason Lee (9 episodes)
- Lyrica Anderson (11 episodes)
- A1 Bentley (11 episodes)
- Lyrica Garrett (9 episodes)
- Pam Bentley (9 episodes)
- Safaree Samuels (9 episodes)
- Rosa Acosta (7 episodes)
- Hazel-E (3 episodes)

The show features minor appearances from notable figures within the hip hop industry and Hollywood's social scene, including Brandy Norwood, Willie Norwood, Yesi Ortiz, Fetty Wap, Princess' wedding planner Diann Valentine, Bryan-Michael Cox, Teairra's friend Andrew Van Devon, Nikki's mother Michelle Mudarris, The Game, Anthony Hamilton, Jackie Long and Ray's manager Cash "Wack 100" Jones.

== Episodes ==
No. overall	No. in season	Title	Original release date	US viewers (millions)
29	1	"California Dreaming"	August 15, 2016	2.45
Newly engaged, Ray and Princess take next steps toward their nuptials, but a dissenting figure threatens their progress. Moniece and Brandi handle some unfinished business. Shanda and Willie's fairytale marriage hits a major snag. Fizz tries to persuade Nikki to move forward in the relationship, but she discovers he's hiding a secret. Nikki, Masika and Princess are added to the opening credits, replacing departing cast members Hazel, Apryl and Omarion. Sonja and Kyesha join the supporting cast. Although credited, Masika does not appear.
30	2	"Homewreckers"	August 22, 2016	2.22
Shanda and Willie's marriage is rocked by a woman from Willie's past and possibly present. Ray and Princess tackle the prenup controversy. Masika struggles to deal with paternity issues. Moniece stirs up trouble with Princess when she publicly spills tea about Ray. Although credited, Fizz does not appear.
31	3	"For the Love of Money"	August 29, 2016	2.25
A1 and Lyrica seemingly have the perfect relationship, but their opinionated mothers threaten the status quo. Princess confronts Moniece over her social media posts. Brandi tries to keep her secret from Max but her plan blows up in her face. Lyrica, A1, Lyrica Garrett and Pam join the supporting cast. Although credited, Masika does not appear. Soulja is removed from the opening credits and reduced to minor guest appearances for the rest of the season.
32	4	"Mama Beef"	September 5, 2016	2.21
A1 and Lyrica struggle to get their moms to make nice before they tie the knot. Masika meets up with Fetty Wap. Max is still furious with Brandi after discovering her secret. New love is in the air for Nikki and things are already becoming complicated. Safaree and Rosa join the supporting cast. Although credited, Moniece, Teairra, Princess and Fizz do not appear.
33	5	"Now or Never"	September 12, 2016	2.05
Nikki is having difficulties juggling relationships with Safaree and Rosa. Tired of all the family drama, A1 and Lyrica finally take matters into their own hands. After Shanda is confronted by Willie's mistress, she decides enough is enough. Although credited, Moniece and Masika do not appear.
34	6	"I Want It All"	September 19, 2016	2.14
Things take a turn when Safaree catches Nikki in the act. Brandi and Max's rocky marriage is tested further when Max begins working with Masika. Princess has her hands full with wedding planning, seemingly with no help from Ray. Although credited, Moniece and Fizz do not appear.
35	7	"Party Pooper"	September 26, 2016	2.10
A1 and Lyrica throw a housewarming party, but it goes left. Ray's business is booming, but it's frustrating Princess. Nikki and Rosa have an awkward moment in public. Teairra deals with legal issues. Although credited, Moniece, Masika and Fizz do not appear.
36	8	"Forgive or Forget"	October 3, 2016	2.13
Moniece evens the score against Brandi. Ray helps Safaree try to reconcile with Nikki, but she has other plans in mind. Willie attempts to win Shanda back. Wedding planning brings up Princess' issues with her estranged father. Although credited, Teairra does not appear.
37	9	"Retribution"	October 10, 2016	2.36
Masika and Fetty Wap aren't seeing eye to eye. Nikki takes a step back from her relationships, and a look inward. Brandi and Princess take action in getting revenge on Moniece, with a little help from Jason. Lyrica's mom has an odd request for her daughter which causes a family blowout. Although credited, Fizz and Ray do not appear.
38	10	"The Leak"	October 17, 2016	2.28
Brandi's takedown plan gets back to Moniece and Fizz. Ray J and Princess' relationship quickly sours. Lyrica's mom goes to an extreme to get revenge against A1. Nikki finally decides who she wants to date. Although credited, Teairra and Masika do not appear.
39	11	"The Source"	October 24, 2016	2.21
Lyrica takes steps to bring peace between the two mothers. Moniece is on a mission to find the source of the sex tape leak. Princess has issues with Ray and Sonja leading up to the marriage. Teairra is forced to face her demons. Hazel is back in town and reunites with Teairra. Hazel returns as a supporting cast member. Although credited, Fizz does not appear.
40	12	"Matrimony"	October 31, 2016	1.87
Ray J and Princess are still at odds and it's unclear if they'll make it down the aisle. Teairra realizes the gravity of her legal and personal problems. Although credited, Fizz does not appear.
41	13	"Reunion – Part 1"	November 7, 2016	2.34
The cast reunites and dive into all the drama of season three. Fizz and Nikki roast each other. Moniece crosses the line when attacking Brandi's family. Nikki reveals if she's with Rosa or Safaree. A surprise guest sends Masika heading for the exit. host: Nina Parker
42	14	"Reunion – Part 2"	November 14, 2016	2.26
The drama continues when Masika and Hazel face off. Willie and Kyesha's texts are revealed. Rosa goes in on Safaree for being cheap. Moniece shocks everyone when she alleges one of the fellas has a baby with a side chick. host: Nina Parker

== Music ==
Several cast members had their music featured on the show and released singles to coincide with the airing of the episodes.

List of songs performed and/or featured in Love & Hip Hop: Hollywood season three
Title	Performer	Album	Episode(s)	Notes	Ref
Trapped In Love	Willie Taylor	single	1	played in studio session	
Da Whole Ting	Lyrica Anderson	single	3	featured in music video shoot	
Feenin (feat. Kevin Gates)	Lyrica Anderson	King Me 2	3	performed onstage	
Cheat On You (feat. Max Lux)	Ray J	single	3	performed in studio session	
Hello	Lyrica Anderson	Hello	4	performed in rehearsal space	
The Most Fun (feat. Papi Chuloh)	Safaree Samuels (as Safaree)	It Is What It Is, Vol. 2	4	performed in studio session	
Closer	Shanda Denyce	single	5	performed in studio session and onstage	
#MySpace (feat. Bigkrunch)	Kyesha Shalina (as KyRaQ)	single	5	performed onstage	
Summertime Love	Lyrica Garrett	single	5	performed onstage	
Jackpot	Willie Taylor	single	5	performed in studio session	
My Own	Masika Kalysha	single	6	performed in studio session	
Chëf	Chiëf	single	7	performed in studio session	
On One	Lil' Fizz (as Fizz)	single	8	performed in studio session	
Bad Bitches Do	Moniece Slaughter	single	8	performed in rehearsal space played at listening party	
Stop Time	Willie Taylor	single	8	background music	
Black Cinderella	Masika Kalysha	single	9	performed onstage	
Romeo Must Die	Max Lux	single	10	performed in studio session	
Blue	Moniece Slaughter	single	10	performed in rehearsal space	
My Connect	Money SL	single	11	performed onstage	
The Point of It All	Anthony Hamilton	The Point of It All	12	performed during wedding	
At Last	Brandy Norwood	unreleased	12	performed during wedding reception	
