= Love & Hip Hop: Hollywood season 2 =

Love & Hip Hop: Hollywood
- Season 2
- Cover used by the iTunes Store
- Starring: Teairra Marí; Moniece Slaughter; Apryl Jones; Hazel-E; Ray J; Lil' Fizz; Omarion; Soulja Boy
- No. of episodes: 14

Release
- Original network: VH1
- Original release: September 7 – December 7, 2015

Season chronology
- ← Previous; Season 1 Next → Season 3

The second season of the reality television series Love & Hip Hop: Hollywood aired on VH1 from September 7, 2015 until December 7, 2015. It was primarily filmed in Los Angeles, California. It is executively produced by Mona Scott-Young and Stephanie Gayle for Monami Entertainment, Toby Barraud, Stefan Springman, Mala Chapple, David DiGangi and Michael Lang for Eastern TV, and Susan Levison, Nina L. Diaz, Vivian Gomez and Ken Martinez for VH1.

The series chronicles the lives of several women and men in the Hollywood area, involved in hip hop music. It consisted of 14 episodes, including a two-part reunion special hosted by Nina Parker.

== Production ==
On August 10, 2015, VH1 announced that Love & Hip Hop: Hollywood would be returning for a second season on September 7, 2015. All main cast members from the previous season returned. Ray J's girlfriend Princess Love joined the supporting cast, along with long time Love & Hip Hop: New York cast member Rich Dollaz, aspiring rappers Miles Brock and Milan Christopher, Miles' ex-girlfriend Amber Laura, Ray J's best friend Brandi Boyd, her husband Max Lux, Willie Taylor and his wife Shanda Denyce. Soulja's fling Nastassia Smith, Fizz's girlfriend Kamiah Adams, gossip blogger Jason Lee and Moniece's mother Marla Thomas would appear in minor supporting roles. On August 8, 2015, a Meet the Cast promo video was released, featuring returning cast members Ray, Moniece, Teairra and Princess, alongside new cast members Amber, Miles, Willie, Milan and Brandi. A 5-minute long "super-trailer" was released on August 27, 2015.

Miles and Milan were the first openly gay couple of the franchise and several episodes featured public service announcements aimed to help viewers struggling with their sexual identity. On October 12, 2015, VH1 announced that Love & Hip Hop: Out in Hip Hop, a round-table discussion moderated by T. J. Holmes of ABC News, would air on October 19, 2015. The special focused on the reality on being openly LGBT in the hip hop community, and coincided with the airing of the seventh episode "Truth", in which bisexual cast member Miles comes out to his ex-girlfriend Amber.

On September 16, 2015, during filming, Hazel-E announced on social media that she had quit the series, comparing it to a "freak show". Hazel had become increasingly frustrated that she had not been properly credited for her work behind-the-scenes, including her influence on casting, as well as her idea for the show title Love & Hip Hop: Hollywood instead of the original Love & Hip Hop: L.A.. Apryl and Omarion did not attend the taping of the second season reunion as Omarion was on tour. On December 7, 2015, Apryl confirmed the two had quit the show and would not be returning next season.

=== Reception ===
The series premiere garnered big ratings for the network, with VH1 announcing a combined rating of 3.6 million viewers. The show's gay storyline received significant media attention, with the special Out in Hip Hop garnering 1.5 million viewers, ranking #1 among women 18-49 in its time period.

== Cast ==
=== Starring ===
- Teairra Marí (13 episodes)
- Moniece Slaughter (12 episodes)
- Apryl Jones (10 episodes)
- Hazel-E (10 episodes)
- Ray J (12 episodes)
- Lil' Fizz (10 episodes)
- Omarion (8 episodes)
- Soulja Boy (7 episodes)

=== Also starring ===
- Milan Christopher (13 episodes)
- Princess Love (11 episodes)
- Nikki Mudarris (13 episodes)
- Rich Dollaz (9 episodes)
- Amber Laura (12 episodes)
- Miles Brock (14 episodes)
- Nia Riley (9 episodes)
- Brandi Boyd (10 episodes)
- Nastassia Smith (5 episodes)
- Kamiah Adams (5 episodes)
- Max Lux (8 episodes)
- Jason Lee (3 episodes)
- Marla Thomas (5 episodes)
- Shanda Denyce (11 episodes)
- Willie Taylor (9 episodes)

Amber's sister Angel Hunter-Brignac and Miles' sister Charmagne Gibson appear as guest stars in several episodes. The show also features minor appearances from notable figures within the hip hop industry and Hollywood's social scene, including Lil Wayne, R. Malcolm Jones, Ray's manager Wack 100, Willie's manager Screwface, Miles' psychotherapist Dr. Stacy Kaiser, Tiny, Nick Cannon, Teddy Riley, Moniece's cousin Stevie Mackey, Big Boy and Nikki's mother Michelle Mudarris.

== Episodes ==
| No. overall | No. in season | Title | Original release date | US viewers (millions) |
|---|---|---|---|---|
| 15 | 1 | "The Real" | September 7, 2015 | 2.39 |
Moniece introduces her new bae, and he's a familiar face. Milan struggles to keep his relationship a secret. When Princess confronts Ray J on their relationship, all hell breaks loose. Milan, Princess, Rich, Amber and Miles join the supporting cast. Although credited, Fizz and Soulja do not appear.
| 16 | 2 | "Friend or Foe" | September 14, 2015 | 2.19 |
A former friend threatens to come between Nia and Soulja's relationship. Princess and Teairra's friendship leaves Ray J dazed and confused. Moniece goes under the gun for her new man. Milan wants Miles to move in but he can't let go of his old life. Although credited, Hazel and Omarion do not appear.
| 17 | 3 | "Ring of Fire" | September 21, 2015 | 2.56 |
When Max leaves his wedding ring at home, Brandi wonders what he's hiding. Nas pops up on Soulja and Nia decides to set her straight. Fizz decides to pump the brakes on his relationship with Kamiah. Milan wonders if Miles is faithful. Brandi, Nas, Kamiah and Max join the supporting cast. Although credited, Moniece does not appear.
| 18 | 4 | "LA Confidential" | September 28, 2015 | 2.49 |
Fizz rekindles his romance with Nikki, who has some parting words for Kamiah. Princess lays a trap to catch Teairra in her lies. Max and Brandi's marriage suffers a setback. Jason pokes his nose into Fizz and Hazel's business. Jason Lee joins the supporting cast. Although credited, Omarion and Soulja do not appear.
| 19 | 5 | "Mum's The Word" | October 5, 2015 | 2.58 |
Ray and Princess have a falling-out. Amber pressures Miles to make a move. Willie tries to launch his solo career while Shanda considers other ways to pay the bills. Rich's meeting with Moniece's mother goes left. Marla, Shanda and Willie join the supporting cast. Although credited, Teairra, Hazel, Fizz and Omarion do not appear.
| 20 | 6 | "The Revelation" | October 12, 2015 | 2.46 |
Princess calls Teairra on her false friendship. Willie tries to get out of his contract. Nikki and Brandi confront Jason and Kamiah. Miles invites Amber to sit down with a therapist. Although credited, Ray, Fizz, Omarion and Soulja do not appear.
| 21 | 7 | "Truth" | October 19, 2015 | 2.55 |
Miles tells the truth to Amber and his family. Max and Brandi resolve their ring issues. Nia has had enough with Soulja's wandering eye. Teairra confronts Ray about his betrayal and considers surgical solutions to her personal problem. Although credited, Moniece, Apryl, Hazel and Omarion do not appear.
| 22 | 8 | "About a Boy" | October 26, 2015 | 2.66 |
Fizz reaches out to get some help raising his son. When Amber learns that Miles is with Milan, she wants to confront him about it. Hazel has an accident. Nia defends her relationship with Soulja to her father. Although credited, Apryl does not appear.
| 23 | 9 | "A Done Deal" | November 2, 2015 | 2.43 |
Willie tries to get out of his contract but Shanda takes matters into her own hands. Rich tries to play peacemaker between Moniece and her mother. Teairra goes in for surgery and Nikki worries if she'll be ready for their fashion show. Amber meets up with Miles to share her feelings about his coming out. Although credited, Apryl, Ray, Fizz and Soulja do not appear.
| 24 | 10 | "For the Family" | November 9, 2015 | 2.38 |
Willie finds out Shanda's been dancing again. Teairra looks like she won't be ready to walk the runway. Fizz wants to talk to Rich about his involvement in his family. Apryl asks Omarion about getting a turn in the spotlight. Although credited, Soulja does not appear.
| 25 | 11 | "Fashion Forward" | November 16, 2015 | 2.57 |
Teairra stuns Nikki and Princess at the big fashion show. Moniece makes a big confession to Fizz. Ray J tries to get Princess back. cameo: Somaya Reece, Estelita Quintero; Although credited, Apryl, Omarion and Soulja do not appear.
| 26 | 12 | "With This Ring" | November 23, 2015 | 2.41 |
Rich confronts Moniece about her feelings for Fizz. Ray J has a surprise for Princess. Miles introduces Milan to his family and gets a mixed welcome. Moniece has choice words for Nikki after she spills the beans to Rich about Fizz. Although credited, Hazel and Soulja do not appear.
| 27 | 13 | "Reunion – Part 1" | November 30, 2015 | 2.53 |
The cast reunites, igniting all of the explosive moments and encounters from the second season. host: Nina Parker
| 28 | 14 | "Reunion – Part 2" | December 7, 2015 | 2.51 |
The drama continues between Moniece, Brandi, Shanda and Princess. Nia and Nas face off for Soulja's heart. Teairra answers for her fashion show antics. Hazel unloads on Jason. Milan drops a bomb. host: Nina Parker

== Music ==
Several cast members had their music featured on the show and released singles to coincide with the airing of the episodes.

List of songs performed and/or featured in Love & Hip Hop: Hollywood season two
| Title | Performer | Album | Episode(s) | Notes | Ref |
|---|---|---|---|---|---|
| Trampoline | Miles Brock (as Siir Brock) | Are You Ready | 1 | performed in studio session | |
| Bo$$ (feat. Rick Ross) | Omarion | Sex Playlist | 1 | performed onstage | |
| Rick Ross | Soulja Boy | King Soulja 4 | 2 | performed in rehearsal space | |
| Whippin' My Wrist | Soulja Boy | King Soulja 4 | 3 | featured in music video shoot | |
| No Chill | Hazel-E | single | 4 | performed in studio session | |
| Brown Sugar (feat. Lil' Wayne) | Ray J | single | 5 | featured in music video shoot | |
| West Coast (feat. Ashad) | Miles Brock (as Siir Brock) | Are You Ready | 6 | featured in music video shoot | |
| Thought I Knew Myself | Willie Taylor | single | 6, 10 | performed in studio session and onstage | |
| Riches | Moniece Slaughter | single | 8, 12 | performed in rehearsal and in studio session | |
| Fuq Iz Yu Thinkn | Milan Christopher | single | 8, 9 | performed in studio session | |
| Freak of the Week (feat. Max-A-Million) | Willie Taylor | single | 10 | played in studio session | |
| Good Lotion | Lil' Fizz (as Fizz) | single | 11, 12 | featured in music video shoot and screening | |
| I'm Up (feat. Kid Ink and French Montana) | Omarion | single | 12 | played during tour montage | |
| When I Go (feat. Papi Chuloh) | Milan Christopher | single | 12 | performed in studio session | |
