= Masika Kalysha =

American actress

- Born: Masika Kalysha Tucker; June 7, 1985 (age 41); Chicago, Illinois
- Occupations: Actress; television personality
- Years active: 2012–present
- Known for: Love & Hip Hop: Hollywood, Growing Up Hip Hop: Atlanta
- Spouse: Jamar Champ (m. 2021, died 2025)
- Children: 2
- Website: kharibarbiebeauty.com

Masika Kalysha Champ (née Tucker; born June 7, 1985) is an American actress, reality television personality and singer. She is best known for her role on the VH1 series Love & Hip Hop: Hollywood, and We TV's Growing Up Hip Hop: Atlanta.

She is a French Creole video vixen and singer, originally from Chicago, Illinois.

== Early life ==
Kalysha was born Masika Kalysha Tucker on June 7, 1985, in Chicago, Illinois. She was raised in Jonesboro, Georgia and she is French Creole. In 2003, Kalysha graduated from Mount Zion High School in Jonesboro, Georgia. On August 11, 2011, Kalysha moved to Los Angeles, California, to pursue her acting and modeling career after the death of one of her friends Lashawna Threatt.

== Career ==
=== Film and reality television ===
In 2005, Kalysha appeared in the music video for "So What" by Field Mob. In 2006, Kalysha made her acting debut in the film Three Can Play That Game.

In 2013, Kalysha made her first reality television appearance on Love & Hip Hop: Hollywood. She did not appear in season 2, but returned for season 3, which chronicled the birth of her daughter, Khari Barbie Maxwell, and her subsequent co-parenting with Fetty Wap.

In 2014, Kalysha started filming for the action movie The Prey with Kevin Grevioux, Danny Trejo and Nick Chinlund. The film hit theaters in May 2020.

In 2017, Kalysha returned to Love & Hip Hop: Hollywood for its fourth season. This was amid tensions with the show's producers, allegedly due to her refusal to film with a new cast member. The season revealed scenes of Kalysha breaking the fourth wall several times to express her displeasure with producers, as well as threatening legal action and storming off set.

In 2018, Kalysha decided not to return to Love and Hip Hop. She quit the show after the season's reunion special, unhappy with her portrayal. Kalysha left VH1 and was later cast on Growing Up Hip Hop: Atlanta.

=== Music ===
In 2015, Kalysha released her single "Andale" featuring Fetty Wap. The single is different from Kalysha's two previous singles, "No More" and "Hella Hollywood," in which both were released early spring 2015. Her single "Hella Hollywood" released May 2015 sampling the 1996 Fugees hit record Ready or Not.

Kalysha released her single "My Own" in the fall of 2016 singing about the relationship between her and rapper Fetty Wap. She released another single "OHHH3X" fall of 2017.

== Personal life ==
On December 11, 2015, Kalysha announced her pregnancy with rapper Fetty Wap. On March 29, 2016, she gave birth to a daughter. On October 28, 2022, Kalysha announced to social media that she had given birth to her second daughter, her first with her husband Jamar Champ. On October 29, 2025, Kalysha’s husband Jamar Champ died in a car accident.

== Business career ==
Kalysha launched Khari Barbie Beauty, an all vegan cruelty-free, gluten-free, and paraben-free cosmetics line on December 17, 2016. The name of her cosmetics line was inspired after her daughter Khari Barbie Maxwell. The cosmetic line includes lip scrub, lip pencils, lipstick tubes and hair growth supplements.

== Filmography ==
Year	Title	Role	Notes
2007	Three Can Play That Game	Woman	
2013	The Love Section	Melody Juggs	
2013	7 Lives Xposed	Penny	5 episodes
2014–2017	Love & Hip Hop: Hollywood	Herself	39 episodes
2018	Growing Up Hip Hop: Atlanta	Herself	10 episodes
2019	Swag Inc.	Ashley	
2020	Pump	Isyss	2 episodes
2020	The Conversation	Herself	2 episodes
2020–2021	Insecure	Curtis's Date	3 episodes
2022	The Prey: Legend of Karnoctus	Lake	
2023	Bomb Pizza	Karmen	
2024	Vicious Murder	Sandra	
2024	You’re My Person	Symphony Gregory	
