= Lyrica Garrett =

American singer and actress

- Also known as: Marci Thomas; Lyrica G
- Born: Marcy Thomas; December 8, 1950 (age 75); Dallas, Texas, U.S.
- Occupations: Singer-songwriter, actress
- Years active: 1973–present

Marcy Thomas (born December 8, 1950), also known as Lyrica Garrett, is an American singer and actress. She started off her career as an Ikette in the Ike & Tina Turner Revue in the 1970s. She also sang with The Undisputed Truth, Rick James, and Johnny "Guitar" Watson. As an actress, she toured with The Wiz production and was later featured on the VH1 reality show Love & Hip Hop: Hollywood with her daughter Lyrica Anderson.

== Life and career ==
Marcy Thomas was born in Houston, Texas on December 8, 1950. She became the musical director for a youth choir at twelve years old. By the age of fifteen she was writing lyrics and performing.

Thomas successfully auditioned for bandleader Ike Turner to become an Ikette in 1974. She toured with Ike & Tina Turner internationally and appeared on various television shows, including Musikladen, Soul Train, The Midnight Special, and Van Dyke and Company before leaving the Ikettes in 1975.

In 1976, Thomas joined the touring musical production of The Wiz. After two years, she left the production and joined the funk group The Undisputed Truth, replacing Chaka Khan's sister Taka Boom. Thomas was the lead female vocalist on the album Smokin' released in 1979. Thomas was a background vocalist on Rick James' album Street Songs which topped the R&B chart in 1981.

As an actress, she had roles in the films Penitentiary II (1982) and Perfume (1991).

Thomas rejoined Ike Turner as one of his Ikettes in 1988. Later going by the professional name Lyrica Garrett, she toured with Turner in 2006. They performed "River Deep, Mountain High," "Proud Mary," and "Nutbush City Limits" at the Night of the Proms. She also performed with Tears for Fears.

In 2016, Garrett joined the supporting cast of Love & Hip Hop: Hollywood, which stars her daughter Lyrica Anderson. The show chronicled Garrett's strained relationship with her son-in-law A1 Bentley and his mother Pam Bentley.

In 2019, Garrett released a music video for her single "Summertime Love" from her album Ready. The album was produced by Dalvin DeGrate.

== Discography ==
=== Singles ===
- 2014: "Seasons of Love"
- 2017: "What Goes Around (Karma)"
- 2018: "December Love"
- 2019: "Summertime Love"

=== Studio albums ===
- 1979: The Undisputed Truth – Smokin' (Whitfield Records)
- 2019: Ready

=== Album appearances ===
- 2006: The Night of the Proms 2006 (Sony BMG)

=== Backing vocal credits ===
- 1978: Johnny "Guitar" Watson– Giant
- 1981: Rick James – Street Songs
- 1985: Dion Miál – "The Indian and the Outlaw"
- 1986: Jesse Johnson – "She (I Can't Resist)"
- 1988: Mark Anthony – Jumpin' Off
- 1992: Sue Ann Carwell – "Painkiller"
- 1992: B Angie B – "A Class Act I"
- 1993: Penny Ford – "Daydreaming"
- 2005: Johnny "Guitar" Watson – The Funk Anthology

=== Writing credits ===
- 1979: The Undisputed Truth – "Misunderstood"
- 1981: Side Effect – "I Need Your Lovin'"
- 1990: Body – "Lie To Me"
- 1997: Titiyo – "Misunderstood"
