= Moniece Slaughter =

American singer and reality television actress

- Occupations: Singer, television personality, actress
- Years active: 2003–present
- Children: 1

Moniece Slaughter is an American singer, television personality and actress best known as being a main cast member on Love & Hip Hop: Hollywood.

== Music career ==
Slaughter's step-father is Dave Thomas of the gospel group Take 6. She credits him for helping her develop her creative and business acumen. Soon after Slaughter graduated high school, Thomas secured her a gig to sing the theme song for America's Next Top Model. She continues to earn royalties for her work.

In 2018, Slaughter independently released the album The Naked Truth. She has also written songs for Akon and Marques Houston.

== Television career ==
Slaughter was a main cast member on Love & Hip Hop: Hollywood alongside rapper Lil Fizz, with whom she has a son. She also appeared on episodes of Love & Hip Hop: Atlanta and Love & Hip Hop: New York.

Slaughter attempted to be released from her contract for the show in 2018 citing mental distress, but was denied. In 2019, she appeared in the sixth and final season of Love & Hip Hop: Hollywood, completing her contract.

== Personal life ==
Slaughter was disowned by her biological father due to her portrayal on television and for her bisexuality.

Between 2011 and 2012, Slaughter was in a relationship with Shaquille O'Neal.

In 2023, Slaughter released a book about her struggles with mental health.
