= List of Total Request Live number one music videos =

Music videos on MTV

The following is the collection of music videos that reached the number-one spot on the daily music video countdown show Total Request Live which aired on MTV from 1998 to 2008. Usually, the same video would stay at the number-one spot for a significant period of time until it was retired or honorably discharged from the countdown and put into a "hall of fame". The countdown was usually determined in various ways such as voting online on MTV.com, the Billboard charts, ratings on the radio and downloads over the internet.

== 1998 ==
Date	Song	Artist
September 14–15	"I'll Never Break Your Heart"	Backstreet Boys
September 16–18	"Tearin' Up My Heart"	*NSYNC
September 21–23	"I'll Never Break Your Heart"	Backstreet Boys
September 24	"Tearin' Up My Heart"	*NSYNC
September 28	"Tearin' Up My Heart"	*NSYNC
September 29–October 1	"I'll Never Break Your Heart"	Backstreet Boys
October 2	"Tearin' Up My Heart"	*NSYNC
October 5–8	"Tearin' Up My Heart"	*NSYNC
October 9	"I'll Never Break Your Heart"	Backstreet Boys
October 12–13	"I'll Never Break Your Heart"	Backstreet Boys
October 14–16	"Tearin' Up My Heart"	*NSYNC
October 19–21	"Tearin' Up My Heart"	*NSYNC
October 22	"I'll Never Break Your Heart"	Backstreet Boys
October 23	"Tearin' Up My Heart"	*NSYNC
October 26–30	"Tearin' Up My Heart"	*NSYNC
November 2	"Tearin' Up My Heart"	*NSYNC
November 4–6	"I'll Never Break Your Heart"	Backstreet Boys
November 9–10	"I'll Never Break Your Heart"	Backstreet Boys
November 11–12	"Tearin' Up My Heart"	*NSYNC
November 13	"I'll Never Break Your Heart"	Backstreet Boys
November 16–17	"Tearin' Up My Heart"	*NSYNC
November 18–19	"All I Have To Give"	Backstreet Boys
November 23–25	"All I Have To Give"	Backstreet Boys
November 30	"(God Must Have Spent) A Little More Time On You"	*NSYNC
December 1–2	"All I Have To Give"	Backstreet Boys
December 3–4	"(God Must Have Spent) A Little More Time On You"	*NSYNC
December 7–8	"(God Must Have Spent) A Little More Time On You"	*NSYNC
December 9–11	"All I Have To Give"	Backstreet Boys
December 14–16	"All I Have To Give"	Backstreet Boys
December 17	"Merry Christmas, Happy Holidays"	*NSYNC
December 18	"All I Have To Give"	Backstreet Boys
December 21–22	"Merry Christmas, Happy Holidays"	*NSYNC
December 23	"(God Must Have Spent) A Little More Time On You"	*NSYNC
Top 100 of '98 Video Of The Year	"The Boy Is Mine"	Brandy & Monica

== 1999 ==
Date	Song	Artist
January 4–8	"All I Have To Give"	Backstreet Boys
January 11	"All I Have To Give"	Backstreet Boys
January 12–15	"(God Must Have Spent) A Little More Time On You"	*NSYNC
January 18	"All I Have To Give"	Backstreet Boys
January 19–21	"(God Must Have Spent) A Little More Time On You"	*NSYNC
January 22	"All I Have To Give"	Backstreet Boys
January 26–29	"(God Must Have Spent) A Little More Time On You"	*NSYNC
February 1–2	"(God Must Have Spent) A Little More Time On You"	*NSYNC
February 3–5	"All I Have To Give"	Backstreet Boys
February 8	"All I Have To Give"	Backstreet Boys
February 9–11	"(God Must Have Spent) A Little More Time On You"	*NSYNC
February 12	"All I Have To Give"	Backstreet Boys
February 15–18	"(God Must Have Spent) A Little More Time On You"	*NSYNC
February 19	"All I Have To Give"	Backstreet Boys
February 22	"All I Have To Give"	Backstreet Boys
February 23–24	"(God Must Have Spent) A Little More Time On You"	*NSYNC
February 25–26	"Freak On A Leash"	Korn
March 1	"Freak On A Leash"	Korn
March 2–3	"All I Have To Give"	Backstreet Boys
March 4	"Freak On A Leash"	Korn
March 5	"(God Must Have Spent) A Little More Time On You"	*NSYNC
March 8–9	"(God Must Have Spent) A Little More Time On You"	*NSYNC
March 10	"Freak On A Leash"	Korn
March 11–12	"(God Must Have Spent) A Little More Time On You"	*NSYNC
March 15–17	"(God Must Have Spent) A Little More Time On You"	*NSYNC
March 18	"Baby One More Time"	Britney Spears
March 22–23	"Freak On A Leash"	Korn
March 24	"Baby One More Time"	Britney Spears
March 25	"Freak On A Leash"	Korn
March 26	"The Hardest Thing"	98 Degrees
March 29	"Freak On A Leash"	Korn
March 30–31	"The Hardest Thing"	98 Degrees
April 1	"Freak On A Leash"	Korn
April 2	"I Drive Myself Crazy"	*NSYNC
April 5–9	"I Drive Myself Crazy"	*NSYNC
April 12–16	"I Drive Myself Crazy"	*NSYNC
April 19–23	"I Drive Myself Crazy"	*NSYNC
April 26–30	"I Drive Myself Crazy"	*NSYNC
May 3–7	"I Drive Myself Crazy"	*NSYNC
May 10–11	"I Want It That Way"	Backstreet Boys
May 12	"I Drive Myself Crazy"	*NSYNC
May 13–14	"I Want It That Way"	Backstreet Boys
May 17	"I Drive Myself Crazy"	*NSYNC
May 18–19	"I Want It That Way"	Backstreet Boys
May 20	"I Drive Myself Crazy"	*NSYNC
May 21	"I Want It That Way"	Backstreet Boys
May 24–26	"I Want It That Way"	Backstreet Boys
May 27–28	"I Drive Myself Crazy"	*NSYNC
May 31	"I Want It That Way"	Backstreet Boys
June 1–3	"I Drive Myself Crazy"	*NSYNC
June 4	"I Want It That Way"	Backstreet Boys
June 7–10	"I Want It That Way"	Backstreet Boys
June 11	"I Drive Myself Crazy"	*NSYNC
June 14–15	"I Want It That Way"	Backstreet Boys
June 16	"I Drive Myself Crazy"	*NSYNC
June 17–18	"I Want It That Way"	Backstreet Boys
June 21–24	"I Want It That Way"	Backstreet Boys
June 25	"I Drive Myself Crazy"	*NSYNC
June 28	"I Want It That Way"	Backstreet Boys
June 29–July 1	"I Drive Myself Crazy"	*NSYNC
July 2	"I Want It That Way"	Backstreet Boys
July 5–9	"I Want It That Way"	Backstreet Boys
July 12–16	"I Want It That Way"	Backstreet Boys
July 19–23	"I Want It That Way"	Backstreet Boys
July 26–28	"I Want It That Way"	Backstreet Boys
July 29–30	"Nookie"	Limp Bizkit
August 2–5	"I Want It That Way"	Backstreet Boys
August 6	"Nookie"	Limp Bizkit
August 9–10	"Nookie"	Limp Bizkit
August 11	"I Do (Cherish You)"	98 Degrees
August 12–13	"Music Of My Heart"	*NSYNC feat. Gloria Estefan
August 16–1	"Music Of My Heart"	*NSYNC feat. Gloria Estefan
August 20	"Nookie"	Limp Bizkit
August 23–26	"Music Of My Heart"	*NSYNC fT. Gloria Estefan
August 27	"Lonely Swedish (The Bum Bum Song)"	Tom Green
August 28 (End Of Summer Countdown Top #1 Video)	"I Want It That Way"	Backstreet Boys
August 30–September 3	"Music Of My Heart"	*NSYNC feat. Gloria Estefan
September 7	"(You Drive Me) Crazy"	Britney Spears
September 8–10	"Music Of My Heart"	*NSYNC feat. Gloria Estefan
September 13	"Music Of My Heart"	*NSYNC feat. Gloria Estefan
September 14–17	"Larger Than Life"	Backstreet Boys
September 20–25	"Larger Than Life"	Backstreet Boys
September 27–28	"Larger Than Life"	Backstreet Boys
September 29	"(You Drive Me) Crazy"	Britney Spears
September 30–October 2	"Larger Than Life"	Backstreet Boys
October 4–6	"Larger Than Life"	Backstreet Boys
October 7	"Music Of My Heart"	*NSYNC feat. Gloria Estefan
October 8–9	"Larger Than Life"	Backstreet Boys
October 11–16	"Larger Than Life"	Backstreet Boys
October 18–23	"Larger Than Life"	Backstreet Boys
October 25–30	"Larger Than Life"	Backstreet Boys
November 1–6	"Larger Than Life"	Backstreet Boys
November 8–13	"Larger Than Life"	Backstreet Boys
November 15–16	"Larger Than Life"	Backstreet Boys
November 17–20	"Falling Away From Me"	Korn
November 22	"Falling Away From Me"	Korn
November 23–24	"Larger Than Life"	Backstreet Boys
November 25	"Falling Away From Me"	Korn
November 26–27	"Larger Than Life"	Backstreet Boys
November 29–December 4	"Larger Than Life"	Backstreet Boys
December 6–12	"Larger Than Life"	Backstreet Boys
December 13	"Larger Than Life"	Backstreet Boys
December 14–16	"Falling Away From Me"	Korn
December 17	"What a Girl Wants"	Christina Aguilera
December 18	"Falling Away From Me"	Korn
December 20	"Falling Away From Me"	Korn
December 21–23	"What a Girl Wants"	Christina Aguilera
December 27	"Falling Away From Me"	Korn
December 28–30	What a Girl Wants"	Christina Aguilera
December 31 (TRL Top 99 of '99 #1 Video)	"I Want It That Way"	Backstreet Boys

== 2000 ==
Date	Song	Artist
January 3–7	"From The Bottom Of My Broken Heart"	Britney Spears
January 10–15	"Show Me The Meaning Of Being Lonely"	Backstreet Boys
January 17–19	"Show Me The Meaning Of Being Lonely"	Backstreet Boys
January 21–22	"Show Me The Meaning Of Being Lonely"	Backstreet Boys
January 24–26	"Show Me The Meaning Of Being Lonely"	Backstreet Boys
January 27–29	"Bye Bye Bye"	*NSYNC
January 31	"Show Me The Meaning Of Being Lonely"	Backstreet Boys
February 1–2	"Bye Bye Bye"	*NSYNC
February 3	"Show Me The Meaning Of Being Lonely"	Backstreet Boys
February 4–5	"Bye Bye Bye"	*NSYNC
February 7–12	"Bye Bye Bye"	*NSYNC
February 14–19	"Bye Bye Bye"	*NSYNC
February 21–22	"Bye Bye Bye"	*NSYNC
February 23	TRL Grammy	
February 24–25	"Bye Bye Bye"	*NSYNC
February 28–March 3	"Bye Bye Bye"	*NSYNC
March 6–10	"Bye Bye Bye"	*NSYNC
March 13–17	"Show Me The Meaning Of Being Lonely"	Backstreet Boys
March 20	"Show Me The Meaning Of Being Lonely"	Backstreet Boys
March 21–24	"Bye Bye Bye"	*NSYNC
March 27–31	"Bye Bye Bye"	*NSYNC
April 3	"Show Me The Meaning Of Being Lonely"	Backstreet Boys
April 4–7	"Bye Bye Bye"	*NSYNC
April 10–13	"Bye Bye Bye"	*NSYNC
April 14	"Oops!... I Did It Again"	Britney Spears
April 17–18	"Oops!... I Did It Again"	Britney Spears
April 19–21	"Bye Bye Bye"	*NSYNC
April 24	"Bye Bye Bye"	*NSYNC
April 25	"Oops!... I Did It Again"	Britney Spears
April 26	"Break Stuff"	Limp Bizkit
April 27	"Thong Song"	Sisqo
April 28	"Big Pimpin"	Jay-Z feat. UGK
May 1–3	"Oops!... I Did It Again"	Britney Spears
May 4–5	"The Real Slim Shady"	Eminem
May 8	"The Real Slim Shady"	Eminem
May 9–12	"The One"	Backstreet Boys
May 15–16	"The Real Slim Shady"	Eminem
May 17	"Oops!... I Did It Again"	Britney Spears
May 18–19	"The Real Slim Shady"	Eminem
May 22–24	"The Real Slim Shady"	Eminem
May 25	"It's Gonna Be Me"	*NSYNC
May 26	"The Real Slim Shady"	Eminem
May 29	"It's Gonna Be Me"	*NSYNC
May 30–June 1	"The Real Slim Shady"	Eminem
June 5	"It's Gonna Be Me"	*NSYNC
June 6–8	"The Real Slim Shady"	Eminem
June 9	"It's Gonna Be Me"	*NSYNC
June 12–13	"It's Gonna Be Me"	*NSYNC
June 14	"If Only"	Hanson
June 15	"It's Gonna Be Me"	*NSYNC
June 16	"The One"	Backstreet Boys
June 19	"The One"	Backstreet Boys
June 20	"If Only"	Hanson
June 21	"The One"	Backstreet Boys
June 22–23	"If Only"	Hanson
June 26–28	"If Only"	Hanson
June 29-20	"It's Gonna Be Me"	*NSYNC
July 3–4	"If Only"	Hanson
July 5	"It's Gonna Be Me"	*NSYNC
July 6	"If Only"	Hanson
July 7	"It's Gonna Be Me"	*NSYNC
July 10–13	"If Only"	Hanson
July 14	"It's Gonna Be Me"	*NSYNC
July 17	"It's Gonna Be Me"	*NSYNC
July 18–19	"If Only"	Hanson
July 20	"It's Gonna Be Me"	*NSYNC
July 21	"If Only"	Hanson
July 24	"It's Gonna Be Me"	*NSYNC
July 25	"If Only"	Hanson
July 26	"Rock the Party (Off the Hook)"	P. O. D.
July 27	"It's Gonna Be Me"	*NSYNC
July 28	"If Only"	Hanson
July 31–August 2	"If Only"	Hanson
August 3	"It's Gonna Be Me"	*NSYNC
August 4	"If Only"	Hanson
August 7–11	"It's Gonna Be Me"	*NSYNC
August 14–16	"It's Gonna Be Me"	*NSYNC
August 17–18	"The One"	Backstreet Boys
August 21–23	"It's Gonna Be Me"	*NSYNC
August 24–25	"If Only"	Hanson
August 26 (End Of Summer Countdown Top #1 Video)	"It's Gonna Be Me"	*NSYNC
August 28–30	"Lucky"	Britney Spears
August 31–September 1	"Come On Over Baby (All I Want Is You)"	Christina Aguilera
September 5–6	"Come On Over Baby (All I Want Is You)"	Christina Aguilera
September 7–8	"Lucky"	Britney Spears
September 11–14	"Lucky"	Britney Spears
September 15 (500th Episode #1 Video)	"It's Gonna Be Me"	*NSYNC
September 18	"Come On Over Baby (All I Want Is You)"	Christina Aguilera
September 19	"Lucky"	Britney Spears
September 20	"Come On Over Baby (All I Want Is You)"	Christina Aguilera
September 21–22	"Lucky"	Britney Spears
September 25–28	"Lucky"	Britney Spears
September 29	"Come On Over Baby (All I Want Is You)"	Christina Aguilera
October 2–3	"Lucky"	Britney Spears
October 4	"She Bangs"	Ricky Martin
October 5	"Lucky"	Britney Spears
October 6	"She Bangs"	Ricky Martin
October 9 (Backstreet Boys Top 10 #1 Video)	"Nookie"	Limp Bizkit
October 10–13	"Shape of My Heart"	Backstreet Boys
October 16–20	"Shape of My Heart"	Backstreet Boys
October 23–24	"Shape of My Heart"	Backstreet Boys
October 25	"She Bangs"	Ricky Martin
October 26–27	"Shape Of My Heart"	Backstreet Boys
October 30–November 3	"Shape Of My Heart"	Backstreet Boys
November 6–10	"Shape Of My Heart"	Backstreet Boys
November 13	"This I Promise You"	*NSYNC
November 14–17	"Shape Of My Heart"	Backstreet Boys
November 20–22	"Shape Of My Heart"	Backstreet Boys
November 27–December 1	"Shape Of My Heart"	Backstreet Boys
December 4–8	"Shape Of My Heart"	Backstreet Boys
December 11–12	"Shape Of My Heart"	Backstreet Boys
December 13	"Love Don't Cost a Thing"	Jennifer Lopez
December 14–15	"Shape Of My Heart"	Backstreet Boys
December 18–21	"Shape Of My Heart"	Backstreet Boys
December 26	"Shape Of My Heart"	Backstreet Boys
December 28–29	"Shape Of My Heart"	Backstreet Boys
December 30 (Top 40 Of 2000 #1 Video)	"Bye Bye Bye"	*NSYNC

== 2001 ==
Date	Song	Artist
January 2–4	"Shape of My Heart"	Backstreet Boys
January 5 (Old School Friday #1 Video)	"Bye Bye Bye"	*NSYNC
January 8–11	"Shape of My Heart"	Backstreet Boys
January 12	"Shape of My Heart"	Backstreet Boys
January 12	(TRL Primetime #1 Video) "My Name Is"	Eminem
January 15–17	"Shape of My Heart"	Backstreet Boys
January 18	"This I Promise You"	*NSYNC
January 19	"The Call"	Backstreet Boys
January 22–26	"The Call"	Backstreet Boys
January 27	"Still On Your Side"	BBMak
January 28	"This I Promise You"	*NSYNC
January 29–February 1	"The Call"	Backstreet Boys
February 2 (Old School Friday #1 Video)	"Bye Bye Bye"	*NSYNC
February 3	"The Call"	Backstreet Boys
February 5–9	"The Call"	Backstreet Boys
February 12	"The Call"	Backstreet Boys
February 13	"Stronger"	Britney Spears
February 14 (Top 10 Love Songs #1 Video)	"All I Have To Give"	Backstreet Boys
February 15–16	"The Call"	Backstreet Boys
February 19 (TRL Grammy Nominees #1 Video)	"Forgot About Dre"	Dr. Dre featuring Eminem
February 20–23	"The Call"	Backstreet Boys
February 26	"Ooh It's Kinda Crazy"	soulDecision
February 27–March 2	"The Call"	Backstreet Boys
March 5–6	"Don't Let Me Be the Last to Know"	Britney Spears
March 7–8	"The Call"	Backstreet Boys
March 9 (Ultimate Top Ten #1 Video)	"Shape of My Heart"	Backstreet Boys
March 12–15	"The Call"	Backstreet Boys
March 16 (Old School Friday #1 Video)	"Bye Bye Bye"	*NSYNC
March 19–22	"The Call"	Backstreet Boys
March 23 (Top 5 Spring Break Videos #1 Video)	"Rollin"	Limp Bizkit
March 26–30	"The Call"	Backstreet Boys
April 2–3	"The Call"	Backstreet Boys
April 4	"So Fresh, So Clean"	Outkast featuring The Dungeon Family
April 5–6	"The Call"	Backstreet Boys
April 9–14	TRL Fan Appreciation Week	
April 9	"It's Gonna Be Me"	*NSYNC
April 10	"Stronger"	Britney Spears
April 11	"My Name Is"	Eminem
April 12	"Adam's Song"	Blink-182
April 13	"Bye Bye Bye"	*NSYNC
April 14	"I Want It That Way"	Backstreet Boys
April 16–20	"The Call"	Backstreet Boys
April 23	"All or Nothing"	O-Town
April 24–27	"The Call"	Backstreet Boys
April 30	"The Call"	Backstreet Boys
May 1	"All or Nothing"	O-Town
May 2	"This Is Me"	Dream
May 3–4	"All or Nothing"	O-Town
May 7	"All or Nothing"	O-Town
May 8–9	"This Is Me"	Dream
May 10–11	"All or Nothing"	O-Town
May 14	"All or Nothing"	O-Town
May 15–18	"More than That"	Backstreet Boys
May 21–25	"More than That"	Backstreet Boys
May 29	"More than That"	Backstreet Boys
May 30	"Pop"	*NSYNC
May 31	"More than That"	Backstreet Boys
June 1	"Pop"	*NSYNC
June 4	"Pop"	*NSYNC
June 5	"More than That"	Backstreet Boys
June 6–8	"Pop"	*NSYNC
June 11–14	"More than That"	Backstreet Boys
June 15	"Pop"	*NSYNC
June 18–21	"Pop"	*NSYNC
June 22	"More than That"	Backstreet Boys
June 25	"Pop"	*NSYNC
June 26	"More than That"	Backstreet Boys
June 27	"Pop"	*NSYNC
June 28–29	"More than That"	Backstreet Boys
July 2	"More than That"	Backstreet Boys
July 3	"Pop"	*NSYNC
July 4–5	"More than That"	Backstreet Boys
July 6	"Pop"	*NSYNC
July 9	"Pop"	*NSYNC
July 10–13	"More than That"	Backstreet Boys
July 16	"Fat Lip"	Sum 41
July 17	"Pop"	*NSYNC
July 18	"More than That"	Backstreet Boys
July 19	"Fat Lip"	Sum 41
July 20	"More than That"	Backstreet Boys
July 23–26	"Pop"	*NSYNC
July 27	"More than That"	Backstreet Boys
July 30–31	"More than That"	Backstreet Boys
August 2	"More than That"	Backstreet Boys
August 3	"Pop"	*NSYNC
August 6	"More than That"	Backstreet Boys
August 7–8	"Fat Lip"	Sum 41
August 9	"Pop"	*NSYNC
August 10	"Fat Lip"	Sum 41
August 13	"Pop"	*NSYNC
August 14	"Fat Lip"	Sum 41
August 15	"More than That"	Backstreet Boys
August 16	"Fat Lip"	Sum 41
August 17	"More than That"	Backstreet Boys
August 20	"Fat Lip"	Sum 41
August 21–24	"Pop"	*NSYNC
August 27	"Pop"	*NSYNC
August 28	"Alive"	P. O. D.
August 29	"Pop"	*NSYNC
August 30	"Pop"	*NSYNC
August 31	"Alive"	P. O. D.
September 4–6	"Alive"	P. O. D.
September 7	"Crush"	Mandy Moore
September 10	"Crush"	Mandy Moore
September 14	Talking About 9/11 Tragedy	
September 18–19	"Alive"	P. O. D.
September 20	"Crush"	Mandy Moore
September 21	"Alive"	P. O. D.
September 24–25	"Alive"	P. O. D.
September 26	"I'm a Slave 4 U"	Britney Spears
September 27–28	"Gone"	*NSYNC
October 1–5	"Gone"	*NSYNC
October 8–12	"Gone"	*NSYNC
October 15	"Gone"	*NSYNC
October 16–17	"We Fit Together"	O-Town
October 18–19	"Gone"	*NSYNC
October 22–23	"We Fit Together"	O-Town
October 24–25	"Gone"	*NSYNC
October 26	"We Fit Together"	O-Town
October 29	"I'm a Slave 4 U"	Britney Spears
October 30	"Gone"	*NSYNC
October 31–November 2	"Drowning"	Backstreet Boys
November 5–9	"Drowning"	Backstreet Boys
November 12–16	"Drowning"	Backstreet Boys
November 19	"Drowning"	Backstreet Boys
November 20	"Gone"	*NSYNC
November 21	"Drowning"	Backstreet Boys
December 3–4	"Drowning"	Backstreet Boys
December 5	"Gone"	*NSYNC
December 6	"Drowning"	Backstreet Boys
December 7	"Gone"	*NSYNC
December 10–14	"Drowning"	Backstreet Boys
December 24	"Drowning"	Backstreet Boys
December 26–27	"Gone"	*NSYNC
December 28	"Drowning"	Backstreet Boys

== 2002 ==
Date	Song	Artist
January 2	"Drowning"	Backstreet Boys
January 3–4	"Girlfriend"	*NSYNC
January 7	"Drowning"	Backstreet Boys
January 8	"Girlfriend"	*NSYNC
January 9–10	"Drowning"	Backstreet Boys
January 11	"Girlfriend"	*NSYNC
January 14	"Girlfriend"	*NSYNC
January 16:	"Girlfriend"	*NSYNC
January 17	"Drowning"	Backstreet Boys
January 18	"Girlfriend"	*NSYNC
January 22	"Drowning"	Backstreet Boys
January 23–24	"Girlfriend"	*NSYNC
January 25	"Drowning"	Backstreet Boys
January 28	"Girlfriend"	*NSYNC
January 29–31	"Drowning"	Backstreet Boys
February 1–2	"Girlfriend"	*NSYNC
February 4	"We Fit Together"	O-Town
February 5	"Girlfriend"	*NSYNC
February 6	"Drowning"	Backstreet Boys
February 7	"Escape"	Enrique Iglesias
February 8	"Drowning"	Backstreet Boys
February 11	"Escape"	Enrique Iglesias
February 12	"Uh Huh"	B2K
February 13	"Ain't It Funny"	Jennifer Lopez feat. Ja Rule
February 14	Top Ten Love Songs #1 Video "Tearin' Up My Heart"	*NSYNC
February 15	Top Ten Britney Videos #1 Video) "I'm a Slave 4 U"	Britney Spears
February 19–20	"Drowning"	Backstreet Boys
February 21	"Escape"	Enrique Iglesias
February 22	"Drowning"	Backstreet Boys
February 25–26	"Drowning"	Backstreet Boys
February 27	"All You Wanted"	Michelle Branch
February 28	"Girlfriend"	*NSYNC
March 1	"Escape"	Enrique Iglesias
March 4–6	"Escape"	Enrique Iglesias
March 7	"Girlfriend"	*NSYNC
March 8	"Escape"	Enrique Iglesias
March 12	"All You Wanted"	Michelle Branch
March 13	"Girlfriend"	*NSYNC
March 14	"Escape"	Enrique Iglesias
March 18	"All You Wanted"	Michelle Branch
March 19–21	"Can't Get You Out of My Head"	Kylie Minogue
March 25–27	"Can't Get You Out of My Head"	Kylie Minogue
March 28	"Overprotected"	Britney Spears
April 1–3	"Can't Get You Out of My Head"	Kylie Minogue
April 4–5	"Overprotected"	Britney Spears
April 8	"Can't Get You Out of My Head"	Kylie Minogue
April 9	"Full Moon"	Brandy
April 10	"Overprotected"	Britney Spears
April 11	"Full Moon"	Brandy
April 15–16	"Full Moon"	Brandy
April 17	"Escape"	Enrique Iglesias
April 18	"Full Moon"	Brandy
April 22	"Escape"	Enrique Iglesias
April 23–25	"Full Moon"	Brandy
April 26	"Overprotected"	Britney Spears
April 29–30	"Here To Stay"	Korn
May 1–2	"Full Moon"	Brandy
May 3	"Overprotected"	Britney Spears
May 6–7	"Without Me"	Eminem
May 8–9	"Overprotected"	Britney Spears
May 10	"Without Me"	Eminem
May 13–14	"Without Me"	Eminem
May 15	"Overprotected"	Britney Spears
May 16	Star Wars Edition	
May 21	"Without Me"	Eminem
May 22	"Overprotected"	Britney Spears
May 23	"Without Me"	Eminem
May 28–30	"Without Me"	Eminem
June 3	"Without Me"	Eminem
June 5	"Gots ta Be"	B2K
June 6	"Overprotected"	Britney Spears
June 7	"Without Me"	Eminem
June 10	"Without Me"	Eminem
June 11	"Overprotected"	Britney Spears
June 12–13	"Without Me"	Eminem
June 18	"Overprotected"	Britney Spears
June 19	"Without Me"	Eminem
June 20	"Overprotected"	Britney Spears
June 24–26	"Hot In Herre"	Nelly
June 27	"Complicated"	Avril Lavigne
July 1–2	"Hot In Herre"	Nelly
July 3	"Boys"	Britney Spears feat. Pharrell
July 8	"Hot In Herre"	Nelly
July 10–11	"Hot In Herre"	Nelly
July 15	"Complicated"	Avril Lavigne
July 16	"Hot In Herre"	Nelly
July 17	"Complicated"	Avril Lavigne
July 18–19	"Hot In Herre"	Nelly
July 22	"Hot In Herre"	Nelly
July 23–24	"Complicated"	Avril Lavigne
July 25	"Hot In Herre"	Nelly
July 29–30	"Ordinary Day"	Vanessa Carlton
July 31	"Complicated"	Avril Lavigne
August 1	"Complicated"	Avril Lavigne
August 5	"Complicated"	Avril Lavigne
August 6–8	"Cleanin' Out My Closet"	Eminem
August 12	"Complicated"	Avril Lavigne
August 13–14	"Cleanin' Out My Closet"	Eminem
August 15	"Why I Love You"	B2K
August 19	"Cleanin' Out My Closet"	Eminem
August 20	"I Do"	3LW
August 21–23	"Cleanin' Out My Closet"	Eminem
August 26	"Sk8er Boi"	Avril Lavigne
August 27–28	"Cleanin' Out My Closet"	Eminem
August 29	"Sk8er Boi"	Avril Lavigne
August 30	"Objection (Tango)"	Shakira
September 3–4	"Sk8er Boi"	Avril Lavigne
September 5–6	"Cleanin' Out My Closet"	Eminem
September 9	"Sk8er Boi"	Avril Lavigne
September 10	"Objection (Tango)"	Shakira
September 11	We Remember (9/11 Event)	
September 12	"Like I Love You"	Justin Timberlake feat. Clipse
September 16–18	"Like I Love You"	Justin Timberlake feat. Clipse
September 19	"Help Me"	Nick Carter
September 20	"Like I Love You"	Justin Timberlake feat. Clipse
September 23–25	"Like I Love You"	Justin Timberlake feat. Clipse
September 26	"Dilemma"	Nelly feat. Kelly Rowland
September 27	"Help Me"	Nick Carter
September 30	"Like I Love You"	Justin Timberlake feat. Clipse
October 1	"Help Me"	Nick Carter
October 2	"Like I Love You"	Justin Timberlake feat. Clipse
October 3	Greatest Hits "Pop"	*NSYNC
October 4	"Dirrty"	Christina Aguilera feat. Redman
October 7	"Like I Love You" -	Justin Timberlake feat. Clipse
October 8	"Lifestyles of the Rich and Famous"	Good Charlotte
October 9	"Before Your Love"	Kelly Clarkson
October 10	"Lifestyles Of The Rich & Famous"	Good Charlotte
October 11	"Dirrty"	Christina Aguilera feat. Redman
October 15–16	"Dirrty"	Christina Aguilera feat. Redman
October 17–18	"Lose Yourself"	Eminem
October 21	"A Moment Like This"	Kelly Clarkson
October 22	"Dirrty"	Christina Aguilera feat. Redman
October 23	TRL 1000 #1 Video "Pop"	*NSYNC
October 24	"Dirrty"	Christina Aguilera feat. Redman
October 25	"Lose Yourself"	Eminem
October 28–30	"Lose Yourself"	Eminem
October 31	"Through The Rain"	Mariah Carey
November 1–19	"Lose Yourself"	Eminem
November 20	"Bump, Bump, Bump"	B2K feat. P. Diddy
November 21–22	"Lose Yourself"	Eminem
November 25	"Lose Yourself"	Eminem
November 26	"Bump, Bump, Bump"	B2K feat. P. Diddy
November 27	"Lose Yourself"	Eminem
December 2–4	"Cry Me a River"	Justin Timberlake
December 5–6	"Lose Yourself"	Eminem
December 9–10	"Lose Yourself"	Eminem
December 11–13	"Cry Me a River"	Justin Timberlake
December 16	"Cry Me a River"	Justin Timberlake
December 17	"I'm With You"	Avril Lavigne
December 18	"Cry Me A River"	Justin Timberlake
December 19	"I'm With You"	Avril Lavigne
December 20	"Cry Me A River"	Justin Timberlake
December 23	"Cry Me A River"	Justin Timberlake
December 27–30	"Cry Me A River"	Justin Timberlake

== 2003 ==
Date	Song	Artist
January 2	"Lose Yourself"	Eminem
January 3	"I'm With You"	Avril Lavigne
January 6	"Cry Me A River"	Justin Timberlake
January 7–8	"I'm With You"	Avril Lavigne
January 9–10	"Cry Me A River"	Justin Timberlake
January 13	"Cry Me A River"	Justin Timberlake
January 14	"All I Have"	Jennifer Lopez featuring LL Cool J
January 15	"Cry Me A River"	Justin Timberlake
January 16–17	"I'm With You"	Avril Lavigne
January 21–23	"The Anthem"	Good Charlotte
January 24	"Cry Me A River"	Justin Timberlake
January 27–29	"The Anthem"	Good Charlotte
January 30	"Bump, Bump, Bump"	B2K featuring P. Diddy
January 31	"The Anthem"	Good Charlotte
February 3	"The Anthem"	Good Charlotte
February 4	"In Da Club"	50 Cent
February 5	"The Anthem"	Good Charlotte
February 6–7	"In Da Club"	50 Cent
February 10	"The Anthem"	Good Charlotte
February 11–12	"In Da Club"	50 Cent
February 13	"The Anthem"	Good Charlotte
February 14	Valentine's Day Special #1 Video "Why I Love You"	B2K
February 17	TRL Awards #1 Video "Larger Than Life"	Backstreet Boys
February 18–21	"In Da Club"	50 Cent
February 24–25	"In Da Club"	50 Cent
February 26	"Rock Your Body"	Justin Timberlake
February 27	"In Da Club"	50 Cent
February 28	"Sing For The Moment"	Eminem
March 3	"In Da Club"	50 Cent
March 4	"Sing For The Moment"	Eminem
March 5	"The Anthem"	Good Charlotte
March 6	"In Da Club"	50 Cent
March 7	"The Anthem"	Good Charlotte
March 10	"In Da Club"	50 Cent
March 11	"Sing For The Moment"	Eminem
March 12–13	"The Anthem"	Good Charlotte
March 14	"Sing For The Moment"	Eminem
March 17	"In Da Club"	50 Cent
March 18–19	"The Anthem"	Good Charlotte
March 20	Coverage on the war in Iraq	
March 21	"The Anthem"	Good Charlotte
March 24	"The Hell Song"	Sum 41
March 25–27	"The Anthem"	Good Charlotte
March 31	"The Anthem"	Good Charlotte
April 1	"Girlfriend"	B2K
April 2	"The Anthem"	Good Charlotte
April 3–4	"Rock Your Body"	Justin Timberlake
April 7–8	"Rock Your Body"	Justin Timberlake
April 9	"Addicted"	Simple Plan
April 10	"Rock Your Body"	Justin Timberlake
April 11	"Fighter"	Christina Aguilera
April 14–16	"Fighter"	Christina Aguilera
April 17–18	"21 Questions"	50 Cent featuring Nate Dogg
April 21	"Fighter"	Christina Aguilera
April 22	"21 Questions"	50 Cent featuring Nate Dogg
April 23	"Rock Your Body"	Justin Timberlake
April 24	"Fighter"	Christina Aguilera
April 25	"21 Questions"	50 Cent featuring Nate Dogg
April 28–May 2	"Fighter"	Christina Aguilera
May 5–8	"Fighter"	Christina Aguilera
May 9	"21 Questions"	50 Cent featuring Nate Dogg
May 12–13	"Miss Independent"	Kelly Clarkson
May 14	"Fighter"	Christina Aguilera
May 15–16	"Miss Independent"	Kelly Clarkson
May 19	"21 Questions"	50 Cent featuring Nate Dogg
May 20	"Miss Independent"	Kelly Clarkson
May 21–22	"Fighter"	Christina Aguilera
May 26	"Fighter"	Christina Aguilera
May 27–30	"Miss Independent"	Kelly Clarkson
June 2–3	"Girls & Boys"	Good Charlotte
June 4	"Rock Wit U"	Ashanti
June 5	"Girls & Boys"	Good Charlotte
June 9	"Miss Independent"	Kelly Clarkson
June 10–12	"Girls & Boys"	Good Charlotte
June 16	"Girls & Boys"	Good Charlotte
June 17–18	"Crazy In Love"	Beyoncé featuring Jay-Z
June 19	"Miss Independent"	Kelly Clarkson
June 23	"Girls & Boys"	Good Charlotte
June 24	"Crazy In Love"	Beyoncé featuring Jay-Z
June 25	Summer Anthems #1 Video "Hot In Herre"	Nelly
June 26	"Crazy In Love"	Beyoncé featuring Jay-Z
June 30	"Crazy In Love"	Beyoncé featuring Jay-Z
July 1–2	"Miss Independent"	Kelly Clarkson
July 3	"Crazy In Love"	Beyoncé featuring Jay-Z
July 7–9	"Crazy In Love"	Beyoncé featuring Jay-Z
July 10	Dynamic Duos #1 Video "Girlfriend (Remix)"	'N Sync featuring Nelly
July 11	"Crazy In Love"	Beyoncé featuring Jay-Z
July 14–15	"Can't Hold Us Down"	Christina Aguilera featuring Lil' Kim
July 16	"Crazy In Love"	Beyoncé featuring Jay-Z
July 17–18	"Can't Hold Us Down"	Christina Aguilera featuring Lil' Kim
July 21	"P. I. M. P. (Remix)"	50 Cent featuring Snoop Dogg & G-Unit
July 22	"Can't Hold Us Down"	Christina Aguilera featuring Lil' Kim
July 23	"P. I. M. P. (Remix)"	50 Cent featuring Snoop Dogg & G-Unit
July 24	Funniest Video #1 Video "Without Me"	Eminem
July 25	"P. I. M. P. (Remix)"	50 Cent featuring Snoop Dogg & G-Unit
July 28	"P. I. M. P. (Remix)"	50 Cent featuring Snoop Dogg & G-Unit
July 29–August 1	"Senorita"	Justin Timberlake featuring Pharrell
August 4–5	"Senorita"	Justin Timberlake featuring Pharrell
August 6	"Can't Hold Us Down"	Christina Aguilera featuring Lil' Kim
August 7	"P. I. M. P. (Remix)"	50 Cent featuring Snoop Dogg & G-Unit
August 8	"Can't Hold Us Down"	Christina Aguilera featuring Lil' Kim
August 11	"Senorita"	Justin Timberlake featuring Pharrell
August 12	"Can't Hold Us Down"	Christina Aguilera featuring Lil' Kim
August 13	"P. I. M. P. (Remix)"	50 Cent featuring Snoop Dogg & G-Unit
August 14–15	"Senorita"	Justin Timberlake featuring Pharrell
August 18–20	"P. I. M. P. (Remix)"	50 Cent featuring Snoop Dogg & G-Unit
August 21	"Low"	Kelly Clarkson
August 26	"P. I. M. P. (Remix)"	50 Cent featuring Snoop Dogg & G-Unit
August 27	"Right Thurr"	Chingy
August 28	"Low"	Kelly Clarkson
August 29	"Right Thurr"	Chingy
September 2	"Right Thurr"	Chingy
September 3–4	"Baby Boy"	Beyoncé featuring Sean Paul
September 5	"Low"	Kelly Clarkson
September 8	"Low"	Kelly Clarkson
September 9	"Baby Boy"	Beyoncé featuring Sean Paul
September 10–11	"So Yesterday"	Hilary Duff
September 12	"Baby Boy"	Beyoncé featuring Sean Paul
September 15	"Baby Boy"	Beyoncé featuring Sean Paul
September 16–18	"Hey Ya"	Outkast
September 19	"So Yesterday"	Hilary Duff
September 22–26	"Hey Ya"	Outkast
September 29–October 2	"Hey Ya"	Outkast
October 3	"Senorita"	Justin Timberlake featuring Pharrell
October 6	"Hey Ya"	Outkast
October 7	"Baby Boy"	Beyoncé featuring Sean Paul
October 8	"Hey Ya"	Outkast
October 9	"Perfect"	Simple Plan
October 10	"Hey Ya"	Outkast
October 14–16	"Hey Ya"	Outkast
October 17–18	"Trouble"	P!nk
October 21	"The Voice Within"	Christina Aguilera
October 22	"Hey Ya"	Outkast
October 23	"The Voice Within"	Christina Aguilera
October 27–29	"Me Against the Music"	Britney Spears featuring Madonna
October 30	"Will You"	P. O. D.
October 31	"Me Against the Music"	Britney Spears featuring Madonna
November 3–7	"Me Against the Music"	Britney Spears featuring Madonna
November 10–14	"Me Against the Music"	Britney Spears featuring Madonna
November 17–18	"Hold On"	Good Charlotte
November 19	"Me Against the Music"	Britney Spears featuring Madonna
November 20	"Hold On"	Good Charlotte
November 24	"Hold On"	Good Charlotte
November 25	"Me Against the Music"	Britney Spears featuring Madonna
December 1–2	"Me Against the Music"	Britney Spears featuring Madonna
December 3	"Invisible"	Clay Aiken
December 4	"Feeling This"	Blink-182
December 5	"Invisible"	Clay Aiken
December 8–9	"Invisible"	Clay Aiken
December 10	"Me Against the Music"	Britney Spears featuring Madonna
December 11	"Feeling This"	Blink-182
December 12	"Invisible"	Clay Aiken
December 15	"Invisible"	Clay Aiken
December 16	"Me Against the Music"	Britney Spears featuring Madonna
December 17–19	"Me, Myself, And I"	Beyoncé
December 22–23	"Me, Myself, And I"	Beyoncé
December 29	"Poppin Them Thangs"	G-Unit
December 30	Song Of The Year "The Anthem"	Good Charlotte

== 2004 ==
Date	Song	Artist
January 5	"Feeling This"	Blink-182
January 6–7	"Poppin Them Thangs"	G-Unit
January 8	"Feeling This"	Blink-182
January 9	"Invisible"	Clay Aiken
January 12–13	"Invisible"	Clay Aiken
January 14	"Feeling This"	Blink-182
January 15–16	"Invisible"	Clay Aiken
January 19–20	"Toxic"	Britney Spears
January 21–22	"Invisible"	Clay Aiken
January 26	"Toxic"	Britney Spears
January 27	"Invisible"	Clay Aiken
January 28–29	"Toxic"	Britney Spears
January 30	"One Call Away"	Chingy featuring Jason Weaver
February 2	"Toxic"	Britney Spears
February 9	"Toxic"	Britney Spears
February 10	"One Call Away"	Chingy featuring J/Weav
February 11–12	"Toxic"	Britney Spears
February 13	"Hold On"	Good Charlotte
February 16	"Toxic"	Britney Spears
February 17	"One Call Away"	Chingy featuring J/Weav
February 18	"Toxic"	Britney Spears
February 19	"Sorry 2004"	Ruben Studdard
February 20	"Toxic"	Britney Spears
February 23–25	"Toxic"	Britney Spears
February 26–27	"Yeah"	Usher featuring Ludacris & Lil' Jon
March 1–5	"Yeah"	Usher featuring Ludacris & Lil' Jon
March 8	"Toxic"	Britney Spears
March 9	"Yeah"	Usher featuring Ludacris & Lil' Jon
March 10	"The Way"	Clay Aiken
March 11–12	"Yeah"	Usher featuring Ludacris & Lil' Jon
March 15–16	"Yeah"	Usher featuring Ludacris & Lil' Jon
March 17	"The Way"	Clay Aiken
March 18	"Yeah"	Usher featuring Ludacris & Lil' Jon
March 22–24	"Yeah"	Usher featuring Ludacris & Lil' Jon
March 25	"My Band"	D12
March 26	"Yeah"	Usher featuring Ludacris & Lil' Jon
March 29–30	"Yeah"	Usher featuring Ludacris & Lil' Jon
March 31	"My Band"	D12
April 1	"Yeah"	Usher featuring Ludacris & Lil' Jon
April 5	"Naughty Girl"	Beyoncé
April 6–7	"Yeah"	Usher featuring Ludacris & Lil' Jon
April 8	"The Way"	Clay Aiken
April 9	"Yeah"	Usher featuring Ludacris & Lil' Jon
April 12–13	"Yeah"	Usher featuring Ludacris & Lil' Jon
April 14	"Roses"	Outkast
April 15	"The Way"	Clay Aiken
April 16	"Everytime"	Britney Spears
April 19	"Everytime"	Britney Spears
April 20	"Roses"	Outkast
April 21–22	"Everytime"	Britney Spears
April 23	"My Band"	D12
April 26	"Everytime"	Britney Spears
April 27–28	"My Band"	D12
April 29	"Everytime"	Britney Spears
May 3–7	"My Band"	D12
May 10–11	"My Band"	D12
May 17	"My Band"	D12
May 18–21	"Burn"	Usher
May 24	"My Band"	D12
May 25–26	"Burn"	Usher
May 27–28	"My Band"	D12
May 31	Summer Anthems #1 Video "Hot In Herre"	Nelly
June 1–2	"Burn"	Usher
June 3	"All Downhill From Here"	New Found Glory
June 4	"My Band"	D12
June 7	"My Band"	D12
June 8	"Burn"	Usher
June 9	"All Downhill From Here"	New Found Glory
June 10	Cross Country Countdown #1 Video "Forgot About Dre"	Dr. Dre featuring Eminem
June 11	"Burn"	Usher
June 14	"Burn"	Usher
June 15–18	"How Come"	D12
June 21–22	"How Come"	D12
June 23	"Leave (Get Out)"	JoJo
June 24–25	"How Come"	D12
June 28	"Leave (Get Out)"	JoJo
June 29	"How Come"	D12
June 30–July 2	"Confessions Pt. 2"	Usher
July 5–9	"Confessions Pt. 2"	Usher
July 12–13	"Confessions Pt. 2"	Usher
July 14	"How Come"	D12
July 15	"Confessions Pt. 2"	Usher
July 19–20	"Our Lips Are Sealed"	Hilary Duff & Haylie Duff
July 21–23	"Confessions Pt. 2"	Usher
July 26–28	"Confessions Pt. 2"	Usher
July 29–30	"My Place"	Nelly featuring Jaheim
August 1–3	"Confessions Pt. 2"	Usher
August 4–6	"Pieces Of Me"	Ashlee Simpson
August 9	"My Place"	Nelly featuring Jaheim
August 10–11	"Pieces Of Me"	Ashlee Simpson
August 12	"Confessions Pt. 2"	Usher
August 13	"My Place"	Nelly featuring Jaheim
August 17–18	"My Place"	Nelly featuring Jaheim
August 19	"Confessions Pt. 2"	Usher
August 20	"My Place"	Nelly featuring Jaheim
August 23	"Confessions Pt. 2"	Usher
August 24	"My Place"	Nelly feat Jaheim
August 25	VMA Performances Countdown #1 Video "Like A Virgin & Hollywood [ 2003 ]"	Madonna, Britney Spears, Christina Aguilera & Missy Elliott
August 26	"My Place"	Nelly featuring Jaheim
August 27	VMA Nominees Special #1 Video "99 Problems"	Jay-Z
August 30	"My Place"	Nelly featuring Jaheim
September 7	"My Place"	Nelly featuring Jaheim
September 8	"Fly"	Hilary Duff
September 9–10	"My Place"	Nelly featuring Jaheim
September 13–16	"My Place"	Nelly featuring Jaheim
September 20–21	"Predictable"	Good Charlotte
September 22	"My Prerogative"	Britney Spears
September 23	"My Prerogative"	Britney Spears
September 27	"Predictable"	Good Charlotte
September 28–29	"My Prerogative"	Britney Spears
September 30	"Predictable"	Good Charlotte
October 3–5	"Predictable"	Good Charlotte
October 6–7	"Just Lose It"	Eminem
October 11–13	"Just Lose It"	Eminem
October 14	"Tilt Ya Head Back"	Nelly featuring Christina Aguilera
October 18–21	"Just Lose It"	Eminem
October 25	"Rumors"	Lindsay Lohan
October 26	"Just Lose It"	Eminem
October 27	"Rumors"	Lindsay Lohan
October 28	"Just Lose It"	Eminem
November 1	"Just Lose It"	Eminem
November 3	"Welcome To My Life"	Simple Plan
November 4	"Just Lose It"	Eminem
November 8	"Just Lose It"	Eminem
November 9–10	"What You Waiting For"	Gwen Stefani
November 11–12	"Just Lose It"	Eminem
November 15	"What You Waiting For"	Gwen Stefani
November 16	Eminem Takes Over TRL #1 Video "The Real Slim Shady"	Eminem
November 17	"Just Lose It"	Eminem
November 18	"Lose My Breath"	Destiny's Child
November 22–24	"Lose My Breath"	Destiny's Child
November 29–30	"Lose My Breath"	Destiny's Child
December 1	"I Just Wanna Live"	Good Charlotte
December 2	"Lose My Breath"	Destiny's Child
December 3	"Since U Been Gone"	Kelly Clarkson
December 6	"Since U Been Gone"	Kelly Clarkson
December 7–9	"Like Toy Soldiers"	Eminem
December 10	"Since U Been Gone"	Kelly Clarkson
December 13–14	"Like Toy Soldiers"	Eminem
December 15	"Since U Been Gone"	Kelly Clarkson
December 16	"Like Toy Soldiers"	Eminem
December 20	"Since U Been Gone"	Kelly Clarkson
December 21–22	"Like Toy Soldiers"	Eminem
December 31	Video Of The Year "Yeah"	Usher featuring Ludacris & Lil' Jon

== 2005 ==
Date	Song	Artist
January 3–4	"Like Toy Soldiers"	Eminem
January 5	"Since U Been Gone"	Kelly Clarkson
January 6–7	"Like Toy Soldiers"	Eminem
January 10–11	"Like Toy Soldiers"	Eminem
January 12–13	"Soldier"	Destiny's Child featuring T.I. & Lil' Wayne
January 14	"Like Toy Soldiers"	Eminem
January 17–18	"Soldier"	Destiny's Child featuring T.I. & Lil' Wayne
January 19	"Soldier"	Destiny's Child featuring T.I. & Lil' Wayne
January 20–21	"Like Toy Soldiers"	Eminem
January 24	"Get Right"	Jennifer Lopez
January 25	"Like Toy Soldiers"	Eminem
January 26	"Get Right"	Jennifer Lopez
January 27–28	"Like Toy Soldiers"	Eminem
January 31	"Like Toy Soldiers"	Eminem
February 1	"Shut Up!"	Simple Plan
February 2–3	"Like Toy Soldiers"	Eminem
February 7–8	"Over"	Lindsay Lohan
February 9–10	"Like Toy Soldiers"	Eminem
February 11	"Over"	Lindsay Lohan
February 14	"Over"	Lindsay Lohan
February 15	"Candy Shop"	50 Cent featuring Olivia
February 16–18	"Over"	Lindsay Lohan
February 21	TRL Awards	
February 22–23	"Mockingbird"	Eminem
February 24–25	"Over"	Lindsay Lohan
February 28	"Over"	Lindsay Lohan
March 1–2	"Mockingbird"	Eminem
March 3	"Do Somethin'"	Britney Spears
March 4	"Mockingbird"	Eminem
March 14	"Mockingbird"	Eminem
March 15	"Number One Spot/The Potion"	Ludacris
March 16–17	"Mockingbird"	Eminem
March 18	"Candy Shop"	50 Cent featuring Olivia
March 21	"Over"	Lindsay Lohan
March 22	"Mockingbird"	Eminem
March 23–24	"It's Like That"	Mariah Carey featuring Fatman Scoop
March 25	"Mockingbird"	Eminem
March 28–29	"Mockingbird"	Eminem
March 30–31	"Signs"	Snoop Dogg featuring Justin Timberlake
April 1	"Candy Shop"	50 Cent featuring Olivia
April 4–7	"Signs"	Snoop Dogg featuring Justin Timberlake
April 11	"Hollaback Girl"	Gwen Stefani
April 12	"Signs"	Snoop Dogg featuring Justin Timberlake
April 13	"Candy Shop"	50 Cent featuring Olivia
April 14	"Hollaback Girl"	Gwen Stefani
April 18	"Hollaback Girl"	Gwen Stefani
April 19–21	"We Belong Together"	Mariah Carey
April 25	"She's No You"	Jesse McCartney
April 26	"We Belong Together"	Mariah Carey
April 27–28	"She's No You"	Jesse McCartney
May 2	"We Belong Together"	Mariah Carey
May 3–5	"Untitled (How Could This Happen to Me?)"	Simple Plan
May 9	"40 Kinds of Sadness"	Ryan Cabrera
May 10	"Untitled (How Could This Happen to Me?)"	Simple Plan
May 11	"She's No You"	Jesse McCartney
May 12	"We Belong Together"	Mariah Carey
May 13	"She's No You"	Jesse McCartney
May 16–17	"We Belong Together"	Mariah Carey
May 18	"She's No You"	Jesse McCartney
May 19–20	"Behind These Hazel Eyes"	Kelly Clarkson
May 23–26	"Behind These Hazel Eyes"	Kelly Clarkson
May 30–June 1	"Behind These Hazel Eyes"	Kelly Clarkson
June 2	"We Belong Together"	Mariah Carey
June 3	"Behind These Hazel Eyes"	Kelly Clarkson
June 6	"We Belong Together"	Mariah Carey
June 7–9	"Behind These Hazel Eyes"	Kelly Clarkson
June 13–15	"Behind These Hazel Eyes"	Kelly Clarkson
June 16	Top Ten Sin City Videos #1 - Snoop Dogg featuring Justin Timberlake - "Signs"	
June 20–22	"Behind These Hazel Eyes"	Kelly Clarkson
June 23	"Sugar, We're Goin Down"	Fall Out Boy
June 27–30	"Behind These Hazel Eyes"	Kelly Clarkson
July 5–7	"Behind These Hazel Eyes"	Kelly Clarkson
July 8	"We Belong Together"	Mariah Carey
July 11–12	"Behind These Hazel Eyes"	Kelly Clarkson
July 13	"Helena"	My Chemical Romance
July 14	"Behind These Hazel Eyes"	Kelly Clarkson
July 15	"Helena"	My Chemical Romance
July 18–20	"Helena"	My Chemical Romance
July 21	"Wake Up"	Hilary Duff
July 22	"Behind These Hazel Eyes"	Kelly Clarkson
July 25	"Behind These Hazel Eyes"	Kelly Clarkson
July 26–29	"Helena"	My Chemical Romance
August 1	"Helena"	My Chemical Romance
August 2–3	"Behind These Hazel Eyes"	Kelly Clarkson
August 4	"Shake It Off"	Mariah Carey
August 5	"Helena"	My Chemical Romance
August 8–9	"Helena"	My Chemical Romance
August 10	"Wake Up"	Hilary Duff
August 11	"Helena"	My Chemical Romance
August 12	"Wake Me Up When September Ends"	Green Day
August 15	"Helena"	My Chemical Romance
August 16–18	"Wake Me Up When September Ends"	Green Day
August 19	"Wake Up"	Hilary Duff
August 22–24	"Wake Me Up When September Ends"	Green Day
August 25	VMA Special Countdown #1 Video - Mariah Carey - "We Belong Together"	
August 26	"Wake Me Up When September Ends"	Green Day
August 29	"Wake Me Up When September Ends"	Green Day
September 6–7	"Shake It Off"	Mariah Carey
September 8	"Wake Me Up When September Ends"	Green Day
September 9	"The Ghost of You"	My Chemical Romance
September 12–13	"The Ghost of You"	My Chemical Romance
September 14	"Shake It Off"	Mariah Carey
September 15–16	"The Ghost of You"	My Chemical Romance
September 19	"The Ghost of You"	My Chemical Romance
September 20	"Boyfriend"	Ashlee Simpson
September 21–22	"The Ghost of You"	My Chemical Romance
September 26	"Boyfriend"	Ashlee Simpson
September 27–29	"The Ghost of You"	My Chemical Romance
October 3	"Boyfriend"	Ashlee Simpson
October 4–6	"Because of You"	Kelly Clarkson
October 10–13	"Because of You"	Kelly Clarkson
October 17–18	"Dance, Dance"	Fall Out Boy
October 19–20	"Because of You"	Kelly Clarkson
October 24	"Dance, Dance"	Fall Out Boy
October 25–27	"Because of You"	Kelly Clarkson
October 31	"Confessions of a Broken Heart (Daughter to Father)"	Lindsay Lohan
November 1–2	"Because of You"	Kelly Clarkson
November 3	"Don't Forget About Us"	Mariah Carey
November 7–9	"Because of You"	Kelly Clarkson
November 10	"Dance, Dance"	Fall Out Boy
November 11	"Because of You"	Kelly Clarkson
November 14	"Beat of My Heart"	Hilary Duff
November 15	"Because of You"	Kelly Clarkson
November 16–17	"Hung Up"	Madonna
November 21–23	"Hung Up"	Madonna
November 28–29	"Because of You"	Kelly Clarkson
November 30–December 1	"Hung Up"	Madonna
December 5	"Because of You"	Kelly Clarkson
December 6–7	"Hung Up"	Madonna
December 8	"Bat Country"	Avenged Sevenfold
December 12–13	"Bat Country"	Avenged Sevenfold
December 14	"Because of You"	Kelly Clarkson
December 15	"Bat Country"	Avenged Sevenfold
December 19–21	"Bat Country"	Avenged Sevenfold
December 22	TRL Video of the Year "We Belong Together"	Mariah Carey

== 2006 ==
Date	Song	Artist
January 3–6	"Because of You"	Kelly Clarkson
January 9–10	"L.O.V.E."	Ashlee Simpson
January 11	"Bat Country"	Avenged Sevenfold
January 12	"L.O.V.E."	Ashlee Simpson
January 17	"L.O.V.E."	Ashlee Simpson
January 18–19	"Bat Country"	Avenged Sevenfold
January 20	"L.O.V.E."	Ashlee Simpson
January 23	"Don't Forget About Us"	Mariah Carey
January 24	"Hung Up"	Madonna
January 25–26	"L.O.V.E."	Ashlee Simpson
January 30–February 2	"Don't Forget About Us"	Mariah Carey
February 6	"Hung Up"	Madonna
February 7–9	"Move Along"	The All-American Rejects
February 13–14	"Move Along"	The All-American Rejects
February 15	"L.O.V.E."	Ashlee Simpson
February 16	"Goodbye for Now"	P.O.D.
February 21–22	"L.O.V.E."	Ashlee Simpson
February 23–24	"Sorry"	Madonna
February 27–March 2	"Sorry"	Madonna
March 6	"Sorry"	Madonna
March 7	"The Real Thing"	Bo Bice
March 8	"Sorry"	Madonna
March 9	"Walk Away"	Kelly Clarkson
March 13–14	"Walk Away"	Kelly Clarkson
March 15	"So Sick"	Ne-Yo
March 16	"Walk Away"	Kelly Clarkson
March 20	"Walk Away"	Kelly Clarkson
March 21	"Hips Don't Lie"	Shakira featuring Wyclef Jean
March 22–23	"Walk Away"	Kelly Clarkson
March 24	"Let U Go"	Ashley Parker Angel
March 27–28	"Let U Go"	Ashley Parker Angel
April 3	"Walk Away"	Kelly Clarkson
April 4–6	"Let U Go"	Ashley Parker Angel
April 10	"Walk Away"	Kelly Clarkson
April 11	"Temperature"	Sean Paul
April 12	"SOS"	Rihanna
April 17–18	"Walk Away"	Kelly Clarkson
April 19–20	"Say Somethin'"	Mariah Carey featuring Snoop Dogg
April 24	"Say Somethin'"	Mariah Carey featuring Snoop Dogg
April 25	"Where'd You Go"	Fort Minor featuring Holly Brook
April 26–27	"Say Somethin'"	Mariah Carey featuring Snoop Dogg
May 1–2	"Where'd You Go"	Fort Minor featuring Holly Brook
May 3–4	"Walk Away"	Kelly Clarkson
May 5	"A Little Less Sixteen Candles, a Little More "Touch Me""	Fall Out Boy
May 8	"A Little Less Sixteen Candles, a Little More "Touch Me""	Fall Out Boy
May 9–11	"Dani California"	Red Hot Chili Peppers
May 15–16	"Walk Away"	Kelly Clarkson
May 17	"Where'd You Go"	Fort Minor featuring Holly Brook
May 18	"Unfaithful"	Rihanna
May 22	"Walk Away"	Kelly Clarkson
May 23–25	"Unfaithful"	Rihanna
May 29	"Walk Away"	Kelly Clarkson
May 30	"Unfaithful"	Rihanna
May 31	"Why You Wanna"	T.I.
June 1	"Walk Away"	Kelly Clarkson
June 2	"Why You Wanna"	T.I.
June 5–6	"Unfaithful"	Rihanna
June 7	"Why You Wanna"	T.I.
June 8	"Unfaithful"	Rihanna
June 9	"Why You Wanna"	T.I.
June 12–14	"Unfaithful"	Rihanna
June 15	"Promiscuous"	Nelly Furtado featuring Timbaland
June 19–20	"Unfaithful"	Rihanna
June 21	"Unfaithful"	Rihanna
June 21	Top 10 Christina Aguilera Videos #1 Video "Ain't No Other Man"	Christina Aguilera
June 22	"Me & U"	Cassie
June 26	"Ain't No Other Man"	Christina Aguilera
June 27–28	"Me & U"	Cassie
June 29	"Ain't No Other Man"	Christina Aguilera
July 10–13	"Ain't No Other Man"	Christina Aguilera
July 17	"Where'd You Go"	Fort Minor featuring Holly Brook
July 18	"Ain't No Other Man"	Christina Aguilera
July 19	"Deja Vu"	Beyoncé featuring Jay-Z
July 20	"Invisible"	Ashlee Simpson
July 24–25	"Ain't No Other Man"	Christina Aguilera
July 26–27	"Deja Vu"	Beyoncé featuring Jay-Z
July 31–August 2	"SexyBack"	Justin Timberlake featuring Timbaland
August 3	"Ain't No Other Man"	Christina Aguilera
August 7	"Ain't No Other Man"	Christina Aguilera
August 8–9	"SexyBack"	Justin Timberlake featuring Timbaland
August 10	"Ain't No Other Man"	Christina Aguilera
August 14–17	"Ain't No Other Man"	Christina Aguilera
August 21	"SexyBack"	Justin Timberlake featuring Timbaland
August 22	"Ain't No Other Man"	Christina Aguilera
August 23	"SexyBack"	Justin Timberlake featuring Timbaland
August 24	"Ain't No Other Man"	Christina Aguilera
August 28	"Call Me When You're Sober"	Evanescence
August 29	"Ain't No Other Man"	Christina Aguilera
August 30–September 1	"Call Me When You're Sober"	Evanescence
September 5	"Call Me When You're Sober"	Evanescence
September 5	Top Ten Beyoncé Videos #1 Video "Ring the Alarm"	Beyoncé
September 6–8	"Call Me When You're Sober"	Evanescence
September 11	"Call Me When You're Sober"	Evanescence
September 12–13	"SexyBack"	Justin Timberlake featuring Timbaland
September 20–21	"SexyBack"	Justin Timberlake featuring Timbaland
September 25–26	"Ain't No Other Man"	Christina Aguilera
September 27	"SexyBack"	Justin Timberlake featuring Timbaland
September 28	"Ring the Alarm"	Beyoncé
September 29	"Love Like Winter"	AFI
October 2	"SexyBack"	Justin Timberlake featuring Timbaland
October 3–4	"Love Like Winter"	AFI
October 5	"SexyBack"	Justin Timberlake featuring Timbaland
October 10	"SexyBack"	Justin Timberlake featuring Timbaland
October 11	"Love Like Winter"	AFI
October 12	"U + Ur Hand"	Pink
October 16	"U + Ur Hand"	Pink
October 17	"Love Me or Hate Me"	Lady Sovereign
October 18	"My Love"	Justin Timberlake featuring T.I.
October 19	"Love Like Winter"	AFI
October 23	"Love Like Winter"	AFI
October 24–25	"Hurt"	Christina Aguilera
October 26	"My Love"	Justin Timberlake featuring T.I.
October 30	"Hurt"	Christina Aguilera
October 31	"My Love"	Justin Timberlake featuring T.I.
November 1	"Hurt"	Christina Aguilera
November 2	"Irreplaceable"	Beyoncé
November 6	"Hurt"	Christina Aguilera
November 7	"Irreplaceable"	Beyoncé
November 8–9	"Hurt"	Christina Aguilera
November 13–14	"My Love"	Justin Timberlake featuring T.I.
November 15	"Hurt"	Christina Aguilera
November 16	"You Don't Know"	Eminem featuring 50 Cent, Lloyd Banks and Cashis
November 17	"Hurt"	Christina Aguilera
November 20	"You Don't Know"	Eminem featuring 50 Cent, Lloyd Banks and Cashis
November 27	"Irreplaceable"	Beyoncé
November 28	"You Don't Know"	Eminem featuring 50 Cent, Lloyd Banks and Cashis
November 29	"Irreplaceable"	Beyoncé
November 30	"Hurt"	Christina Aguilera
December 4	"Hurt"	Christina Aguilera
December 5–7	"You Don't Know"	Eminem featuring 50 Cent, Lloyd Banks and Cashis
December 11–14	"Irreplaceable"	Beyoncé
December 18	"Irreplaceable"	Beyoncé
December 19	"Hurt"	Christina Aguilera
December 20	"Irreplaceable"	Beyoncé
December 21	"How to Save a Life"	The Fray

== 2007 ==
Date	Song	Artist
January 8–10	"This Ain't a Scene, It's an Arms Race"	Fall Out Boy
January 11	"Hurt"	Christina Aguilera
January 16–17	"This Ain't a Scene, It's an Arms Race"	Fall Out Boy
January 18	"Irreplaceable"	Beyoncé
January 19	"This Ain't a Scene, It's an Arms Race"	Fall Out Boy
January 22–23	"Say It Right"	Nelly Furtado
January 24	"Famous Last Words"	My Chemical Romance
January 25	"This Ain't a Scene, It's an Arms Race"	Fall Out Boy
January 29–30	"Famous Last Words"	My Chemical Romance
January 31	"This Ain't a Scene, It's an Arms Race"	Fall Out Boy
February 1	"Famous Last Words"	My Chemical Romance
February 5	"This Ain't a Scene, It's an Arms Race"	Fall Out Boy
February 5	Katharine McPhee's Playlist #1 Video "Don't Stop Believin'"	Journey
February 6	"This Ain't a Scene, It's an Arms Race"	Fall Out Boy
February 6	Fall Out Boy's Playlist #1 Video "Mo Money, Mo Problems"	The Notorious B.I.G. featuring Mase and P. Diddy
February 7	"This Ain't a Scene, It's an Arms Race"	Fall Out Boy
February 7	Fergie's Playlist #1 Video "I Love Rock n' Roll"	Joan Jett and the Blackhearts
February 8	"This Ain't a Scene, It's an Arms Race"	Fall Out Boy
February 8	Hilary Duff's Playlist #1 Video "Beautiful Day"	U2
February 9	"This Ain't a Scene, It's an Arms Race"	Fall Out Boy
February 9	Good Charlotte's Playlist #1 Video "Rock the Cashbah"	The Clash
February 12–13	"Famous Last Words"	My Chemical Romance
February 14	"Qué Hiciste"	Jennifer Lopez
February 15	"Famous Last Words"	My Chemical Romance
February 20	"Famous Last Words"	My Chemical Romance
February 21–22	"With Love"	Hilary Duff
February 23	"Famous Last Words"	My Chemical Romance
February 26	"With Love"	Hilary Duff
February 27	"Candyman"	Christina Aguilera
February 28	"With Love"	Hilary Duff
March 1	"Over It"	Katharine McPhee
March 5	"Over It"	Katharine McPhee
March 6–7	"Candyman"	Christina Aguilera
March 8	"Beautiful Liar"	Beyoncé featuring Shakira
March 12	"Candyman"	Christina Aguilera
March 13–15	"Beautiful Liar"	Beyoncé featuring Shakira
March 19	"Beautiful Liar"	Beyoncé featuring Shakira
March 20–21	"Girlfriend"	Avril Lavigne
March 22	"Beautiful Liar"	Beyoncé featuring Shakira
March 26	"Girlfriend"	Avril Lavigne
March 27	"With Love"	Hilary Duff
March 28	"Girlfriend"	Avril Lavigne
March 29	"With Love"	Hilary Duff
April 16	"With Love"	Hilary Duff
April 17	"Thnks Fr Th Mmrs"	Fall Out Boy
April 18	"Beautiful Liar"	Beyoncé featuring Shakira
April 19	"Thnks Fr Th Mmrs"	Fall Out Boy
April 23–24	"Thnks Fr Th Mmrs"	Fall Out Boy
April 25	"With Love"	Hilary Duff
April 26	"What I've Done"	Linkin Park
April 30–May 1	"What I've Done"	Linkin Park
May 2	"Thnks Fr Th Mmrs"	Fall Out Boy
May 3	"What I've Done"	Linkin Park
May 7–8	"What I've Done"	Linkin Park
May 9	"Umbrella"	Rihanna featuring Jay-Z
May 10	"Never Again"	Kelly Clarkson
May 14	"Umbrella"	Rihanna featuring Jay-Z
May 15–16	"Never Again"	Kelly Clarkson
May 17	"Umbrella"	Rihanna featuring Jay-Z
May 21	"Never Again"	Kelly Clarkson
May 22	"Umbrella"	Rihanna featuring Jay-Z
May 22	TRL 2000th Episode Countdown #1 Video "Cry Me a River"	Justin Timberlake
May 23	"Home"	Daughtry
May 24	"Umbrella"	Rihanna featuring Jay-Z
May 29–June 1	"Umbrella"	Rihanna featuring Jay-Z
June 4–6	"Umbrella"	Rihanna featuring Jay-Z
June 7	"Rehab"	Amy Winehouse
June 11	"Rehab"	Amy Winehouse
June 12–13	"Umbrella"	Rihanna featuring Jay-Z
June 14	"Lip Gloss"	Lil' Mama
June 18–19	"Lip Gloss"	Lil' Mama
June 20	"Umbrella"	Rihanna featuring Jay-Z
June 21	"Lip Gloss"	Lil' Mama
June 26–27	"Lip Gloss"	Lil' Mama
June 28	"Party Like A Rockstar"	Shop Boyz
July 2–4	"Party Like A Rockstar"	Shop Boyz
July 5	"Lip Gloss"	Lil' Mama
July 9–10	"Teenagers"	My Chemical Romance
July 11–12	"The Take Over, the Breaks Over"	Fall Out Boy
July 16	"The Take Over, the Breaks Over"	Fall Out Boy
July 17	"Wall to Wall"	Chris Brown
July 18–19	"The Take Over, the Breaks Over"	Fall Out Boy
July 23	"Lip Gloss"	Lil' Mama
July 26	"Wall to Wall"	Chris Brown
July 30	"Wall to Wall"	Chris Brown
July 31–August 1	"The Great Escape"	Boys Like Girls
August 2	"Clothes Off"	Gym Class Heroes
August 6	"Clothes Off"	Gym Class Heroes
August 7–9	"The Great Escape"	Boys Like Girls
August 13–14	"Easy"	Paula DeAnda featuring Bow Wow
August 15	"The Great Escape"	Boys Like Girls
August 16	"Clothes Off"	Gym Class Heroes
August 20–21	"Clothes Off"	Gym Class Heroes
August 22	"When You're Gone"	Avril Lavigne
August 23	"Easy"	Paula DeAnda featuring Bow Wow
August 27	"Easy"	Paula DeAnda featuring Bow Wow
August 28–29	"When You're Gone"	Avril Lavigne
August 30	"The Great Escape"	Boys Like Girls
September 4–5	"The Great Escape"	Boys Like Girls
September 6	"When You're Gone"	Avril Lavigne
September 7	"Do It"	Nelly Furtado
September 10–11	"Do It"	Nelly Furtado
September 12	"Hip Hop Police"	Chamillionaire featuring Slick Rick
September 13	"Do It"	Nelly Furtado
September 17–18	"Do It"	Nelly Furtado
September 19–20	"Hip Hop Police"	Chamillionaire featuring Slick Rick
October 1	"Misery Business"	Paramore
October 2	"Money in the Bank"	Swizz Beatz
October 3	"Hip Hop Police"	Chamillionaire featuring Slick Rick
October 4	"Misery Business"	Paramore
October 8	"Misery Business"	Paramore
October 9–10	"Hate That I Love You"	Rihanna featuring Ne-Yo
October 11	"He Said She Said"	Ashley Tisdale
October 15–16	"He Said She Said"	Ashley Tisdale
October 17	"Kiss Kiss"	Chris Brown featuring T-Pain
October 18	"He Said She Said"	Ashley Tisdale
October 22–24	"Crank That (Soulja Boy)"	Soulja Boy
October 25	"Kiss Kiss"	Chris Brown featuring T-Pain
October 29	"Crank That (Soulja Boy)"	Soulja Boy
October 30–November 1	"Apologize"	Timbaland featuring OneRepublic
November 5–7	"Apologize"	Timbaland featuring OneRepublic
November 8	"No One"	Alicia Keys
November 12–15	"No One"	Alicia Keys
November 19–20	"No One"	Alicia Keys
November 27	"No One"	Alicia Keys
November 28	"Apologize"	Timbaland featuring OneRepublic
December 10–13	"No One"	Alicia Keys
December 17	"No One"	Alicia Keys
December 19	"No One"	Alicia Keys
December 20	"Low"	Flo Rida featuring T-Pain

== 2008 ==
Date	Song	Artist
January 7–10	"Low"	Flo Rida featuring T-Pain
January 14–17	"Low"	Flo Rida featuring T-Pain
January 22–24	"Low"	Flo Rida featuring T-Pain
January 28–31	"Low"	Flo Rida featuring T-Pain
Special TRL - MTV.com videos (February 6); February 4–6	"Low"	Flo Rida featuring T-Pain
February 11–14	"Low"	Flo Rida featuring T-Pain
February 25	"Low"	Flo Rida featuring T-Pain
February 26–28	"With You"	Chris Brown
March 3	"With You"	Chris Brown
Top 15 Online Views; March 4	"Touch My Body"	Mariah Carey
March 5	"With You"	Chris Brown
Top 10 Online Views; March 6	"Yahhh!"	Soulja Boy featuring Arab
March 10–11	"With You"	Chris Brown
Top 10 Online Views; March 12	"Shawty Get Loose"	Lil' Mama featuring Chris Brown & T-Pain
March 13	Snoop Dogg Takes Over	
March 17–19	"With You"	Chris Brown
March 20	"Elevator"	Flo Rida featuring Timbaland
April 7	"Bleeding Love"	Leona Lewis
April 8	"Touch My Body"	Mariah Carey
April 9	"Bleeding Love"	Leona Lewis
April 10	No TRL	
April 14–15	"Touch My Body"	Mariah Carey
Votes only April 16	"4 Minutes"	Madonna featuring Justin Timberlake & Timbaland
Online views April 17	"Love In This Club"	Usher featuring Young Jeezy
April 21	"Bleeding Love"	Leona Lewis
April 23–24	"Bleeding Love"	Leona Lewis
April 28–May 1	"Lollipop"	Lil Wayne featuring Static Major
Votes only May 5–6	"Ready Set Go"	Tokio Hotel
May 7–8	"Lollipop"	Lil Wayne featuring Static Major
May 13–15	"Lollipop"	Lil Wayne featuring Static Major
May 20–22	"Lollipop"	Lil Wayne featuring Static Major
May 27	Usher Videos, First Looks, Best Kiss Nominees (MTV Movie Awards)	
May 28	Sizzlin' Summer Videos	
May 29	"Lollipop"	Lil Wayne featuring Static Major
June 2	Ultimate Blonde Videos	
June 3–4	"Lollipop"	Lil Wayne featuring Static Major
June 5	"Take a Bow"	Rihanna
June 10–12	"Lollipop"	Lil Wayne featuring Static Major
June 13	Video DJ	
June 16–19	"Take a Bow"	Rihanna
June 23	"Take a Bow"	Rihanna
June 24	"I Kissed a Girl"	Katy Perry
June 25–26	Video DJ w/ DJ Randy	
June 30–July 3	"I Kissed a Girl"	Katy Perry
July 7–8	"I Kissed a Girl"	Katy Perry
July 9	TRL Second Chance	
July 10	"I Kissed a Girl"	Katy Perry
July 15–17	"I Kissed a Girl"	Katy Perry
July 21–24	"I Kissed a Girl"	Katy Perry
July 28–31	"I Kissed a Girl"	Katy Perry
August 5	"Closer"	Ne-Yo
August 6–7	"Disturbia"	Rihanna
August 11–14	"Disturbia"	Rihanna
August 19	"Paper Planes"	M.I.A.
August 20–21	"Disturbia"	Rihanna
August 26–27	"Disturbia"	Rihanna
August 28	High School Videos	
September 2	"Disturbia"	Rihanna
September 3	"Whatever You Like"	T.I.
September 4	VMA Videos	
MTV.com Streams; September 8	"Official Girl"	Cassie featuring Lil Wayne
September 10–11	"Whatever You Like"	T.I.
October 14	Beyoncé #1 Video "Irreplaceable"	Beyoncé
MTV.com Top 10; October 15–16	"She Got Her Own"	Ne-Yo featuring Jamie Foxx and Fabolous
October 21	Girl Power Top 10 "Survivor"	Destiny's Child
October 21	#1 TRL Times Square Moment – Eminem shuts down Times Square (November 8, 2002)	
October 22	Hip Hop Top 10 "Lose Yourself"	Eminem
October 22	#1 Athlete Moment – LeBron vs. Magic (June 16, 2003)	
October 23	Favorite 1sts Top 10 "...Baby One More Time"	Britney Spears
October 23	#1 Field Trip Moment – Damien interviews Stewie	
October 28	Boy Band Top 10 "Bye Bye Bye"	NSYNC
October 28	#1 Only on TRL Moment – Black Attack (October 16, 2003; May 29, 2006; December 5, 2005; November 11, 2003; September 29, 2003; May 5, 2008)	
October 29	One-Hit Wonder Top 10 "Thong Song"	Sisqo
October 29	#1 TRL on Location Moment – TRL @ Your House (April 14, 2001)	
October 30	Collaboration Top 10 "Lady Marmalade"	Christina Aguilera featuring Lil' Kim, Pink & Mýa
October 30	#1 TRL Show Opener – TRL Hogan Style (March 15, 2006)	
November 4	Funniest Video Top 10 "The Bad Touch"	Bloodhound Gang
November 4	#1 Celebrity Odd Couple – Elton John and Justin Timberlake Dream Therapy (January 11, 2002)	
November 5	#1 MTV News Moment – TBA	
November 6	Rock Videos Countdown "What's My Age Again"	Blink-182
November 6	#1 Top 10 Unscripted Moments – Ron Burgundy on TRL (June 30, 2004)	
November 11	TRL Videos Countdown "(God Must Have Spent) A Little Time on You"	NSYNC
November 11	#1 Top 10 Awkward Moments – Liam Gallagher being Liam Gallagher (March 30, 2000)	
November 12	Celebrity Cameo Countdown "Bad Boy for Life"	P. Diddy
November 13	TRL Top 10 Performance Countdown "Like I Love You"	Justin Timberlake
Finale; November 16	Top Ten Iconic Videos "...Baby One More Time"	Britney Spears
Finale; November 16	Performances by Beyoncé, Fall Out Boy, Ludacris, Nelly, Snoop Dogg, Backstreet Boys, 50 Cent etc	
Finale; November 16	Many guests stop by for a visit	
Finale; November 16	Memories	

== Final top 10 ==
TRL chose the top ten most iconic videos and aired them as their final countdown.

Position	Year	Artist	Video	Director
1	1998	Britney Spears	"...Baby One More Time"	Nigel Dick
2	2000	Eminem	"The Real Slim Shady"	Dr. Dre/Philip Atwell
3	1999	Backstreet Boys	"I Want It That Way"	Wayne Isham
4	2000	*NSYNC	"Bye Bye Bye"	Wayne Isham
5	2002	Christina Aguilera	"Dirrty"	David LaChapelle
6	1999	Kid Rock	"Bawitdaba"	Dave Meyers
7	2003	Beyoncé featuring Jay-Z	"Crazy in Love"	Jake Nava
8	2004	Usher featuring Ludacris & Lil' Jon	"Yeah!"	Mr. X
9	1999	Blink-182	"What's My Age Again"	Marcos Siega
10	2003	Outkast	"Hey Ya!"	Bryan Barber

== See also ==
- 106 & Park
- MuchOnDemand
