= List of number-one singles of 2000 (Canada) =

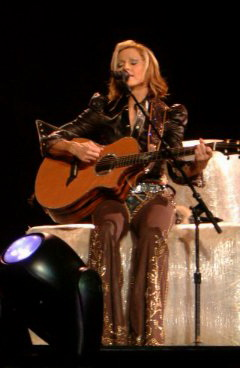
Madonna spent the most weeks at number one in Canada during 2000: nine weeks on the RPM chart and 14 weeks on the Nielsen SoundScan chart.

The following tables list Canada's number-one singles of 2000.

== RPM Singles Chart ==
RPM was a Canadian magazine that published the best-performing singles of Canada from 1964 to 2000. The final RPM chart was issued on 6 November 2000, when the magazine ceased publication. After 6 November, the number-one singles in Canada were compiled by the American-based music sales tracking company Nielsen SoundScan.

Sixteen songs reached number one on the RPM singles chart during 2000. Eiffel 65 had the first number-one hit of the year with "Blue (Da Ba Dee)", and O-Town finished the year at number one with "Liquid Dreams". Ten artists topped the Canadian chart for the first time this year: Christina Aguilera, Backstreet Boys, soulDecision, Thrust, NSYNC, Third Eye Blind, The Product G&B, Sonique, and the Moffatts. NSYNC was the only act that reached number one with more than one single in 2000. However, with data from the Nielsen SoundScan chart included, Madonna and Backstreet Boys also achieved multiple number-one hits.

Because RPM ceased publication in November, no year-end chart for Canada exists for 2000. In terms of weeks spent at number one, Madonna was the most successful act, topping the RPM Singles Chart for nine weeks in September, October, and November with "Music". Backstreet Boys earned the second-highest tally, eight weeks, with "Show Me the Meaning of Being Lonely" and "Shape of My Heart". Britney Spears had a six-week number-one hit with "Oops!... I Did It Again" while NSYNC, Sonique, and Matchbox Twenty spent five issues at number one with their number-one songs. Savage Garden and Third Eye Blind stayed four and three weeks at the summit, respectively. Three Canadian acts peaked at number one in 2000: soulDecision, Thrust, and the Moffats.

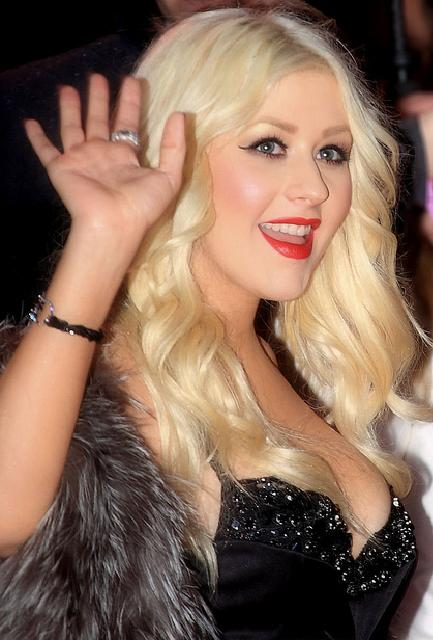
Christina Aguilera topped the RPM chart for three nonconsecutive weeks with "What a Girl Wants".

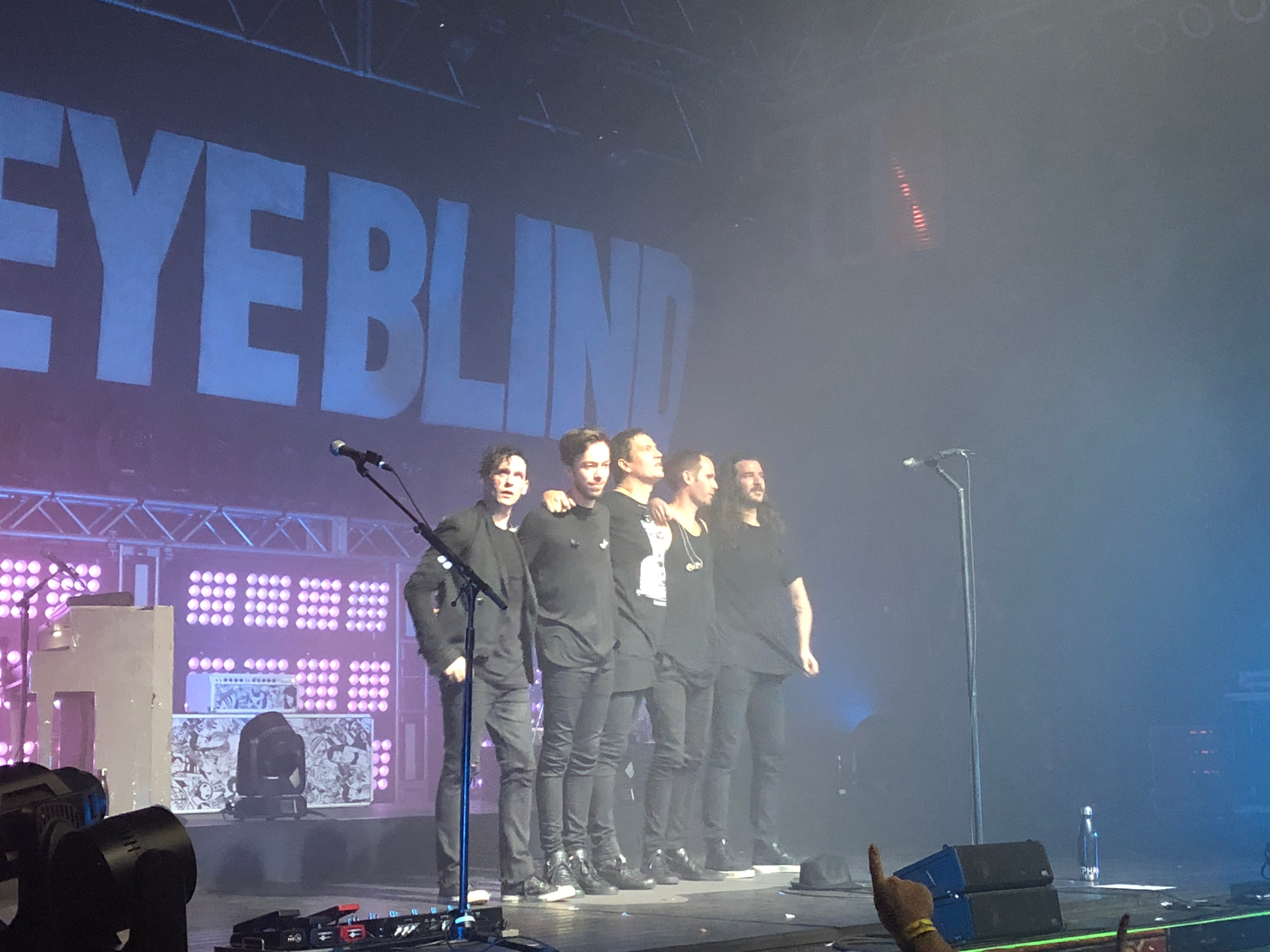
Third Eye Blind stayed at number one for three issues in March and April with "Never Let You Go".

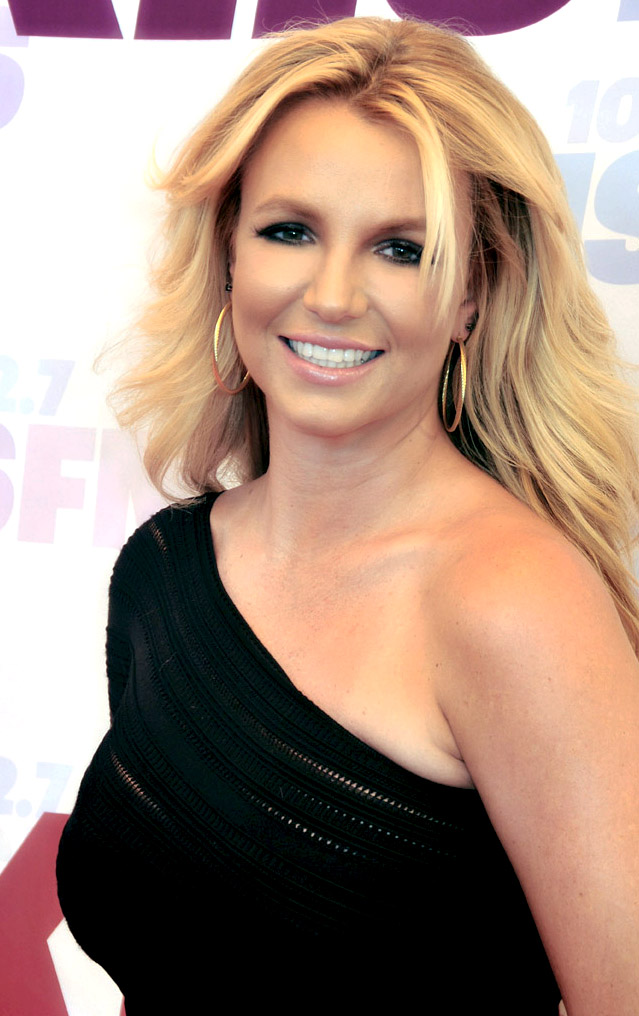
"Oops!... I Did It Again" gave Britney Spears her second RPM number-one hit in May.

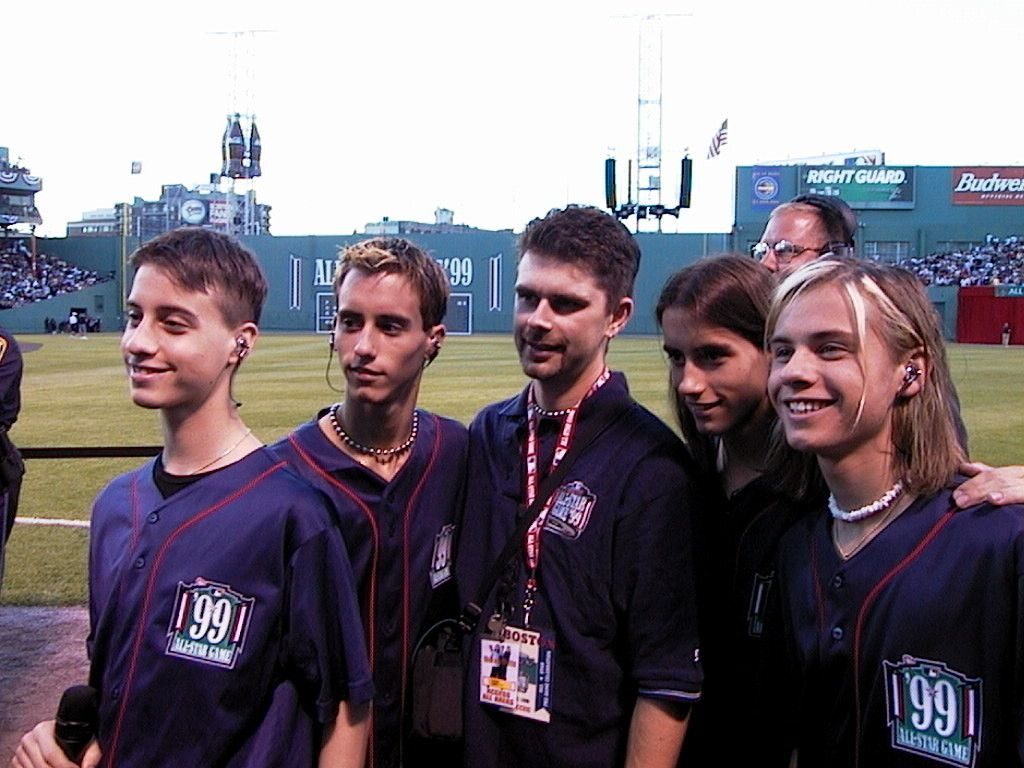
"Bang Bang Boom" by Canadian band the Moffatts spent one week at number one on RPM in August 2000.

Issue date	Song	Artist	Reference
3 January (Note: Due to a two-week break in publication over the 1999/2000 Christmas/New Year period, the week of 3 January is inferred.)	"Blue (Da Ba Dee)"	Eiffel 65	
10 January	"I Knew I Loved You"	Savage Garden	
17 January	"I Knew I Loved You"	Savage Garden	
24 January	"What a Girl Wants"	Christina Aguilera	
31 January	"I Knew I Loved You"	Savage Garden	
7 February	"I Knew I Loved You"	Savage Garden	
14 February	"What a Girl Wants"	Christina Aguilera	
21 February	"What a Girl Wants"	Christina Aguilera	
28 February	"Show Me the Meaning of Being Lonely"	Backstreet Boys	
6 March	"Show Me the Meaning of Being Lonely"	Backstreet Boys	
13 March	"Faded"	soulDecision featuring Thrust	
20 March	"Bye Bye Bye"	NSYNC	
27 March	"Never Let You Go"	Third Eye Blind	
3 April	"Never Let You Go"	Third Eye Blind	
10 April	"Never Let You Go"	Third Eye Blind	
17 April	"Maria Maria"	Santana featuring The Product G&B	
24 April	"It Feels So Good"	Sonique	
1 May	"It Feels So Good"	Sonique	
8 May	"It Feels So Good"	Sonique	
15 May	"It Feels So Good"	Sonique	
22 May	"It Feels So Good"	Sonique	
29 May	"Oops!... I Did It Again"	Britney Spears	
5 June	"Oops!... I Did It Again"	Britney Spears	
12 June	"Oops!... I Did It Again"	Britney Spears	
19 June	"Oops!... I Did It Again"	Britney Spears	
26 June	"Oops!... I Did It Again"	Britney Spears	
3 July	"Oops!... I Did It Again"	Britney Spears	
10 July	"It's Gonna Be Me"	NSYNC	
17 July	"It's Gonna Be Me"	NSYNC	
24 July	"It's Gonna Be Me"	NSYNC	
31 July	"Bent"	Matchbox Twenty	
7 August	"Bent"	Matchbox Twenty	
14 August	"Bang Bang Boom"	The Moffatts	
21 August	"Bent"	Matchbox Twenty	
28 August	"Bent"	Matchbox Twenty	
4 September	"Bent"	Matchbox Twenty	
11 September	"Music"	Madonna	
18 September	"Music"	Madonna	
25 September	"Music"	Madonna	
2 October	"Music"	Madonna	
9 October	"Music"	Madonna	
16 October	"Music"	Madonna	
23 October (Note: No chart was published on 23 October, so a week's gap is inferred.)	"Music"	Madonna	
30 October	"Music"	Madonna	
6 November	"Music"	Madonna	

== Nielsen SoundScan Singles chart ==
The following lists the number-one singles of Canada in 2000 according to Nielsen SoundScan. The chart was compiled every Wednesday and published by Jam! Canoe on Thursdays. The chart also appeared in Billboard magazine under the Hits of the World section. Only songs released as physical singles qualified for this chart during this time. During this period, the singles market in Canada was very limited in both scope and availability, and in many cases, these songs received little or no radio support. Nevertheless, this was the only singles chart Canadians had until June 2007, when the Canadian Hot 100 was released to the public. Note that Billboard publishes charts with an issue date approximately 7–10 days in advance.

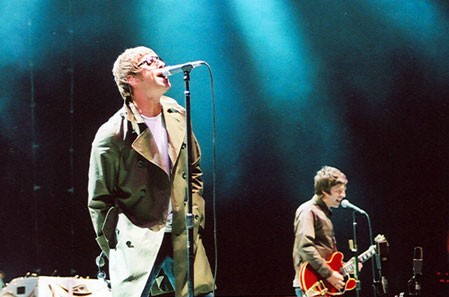
"Go Let It Out" by Britpop band Oasis spent a week at number one in late February.

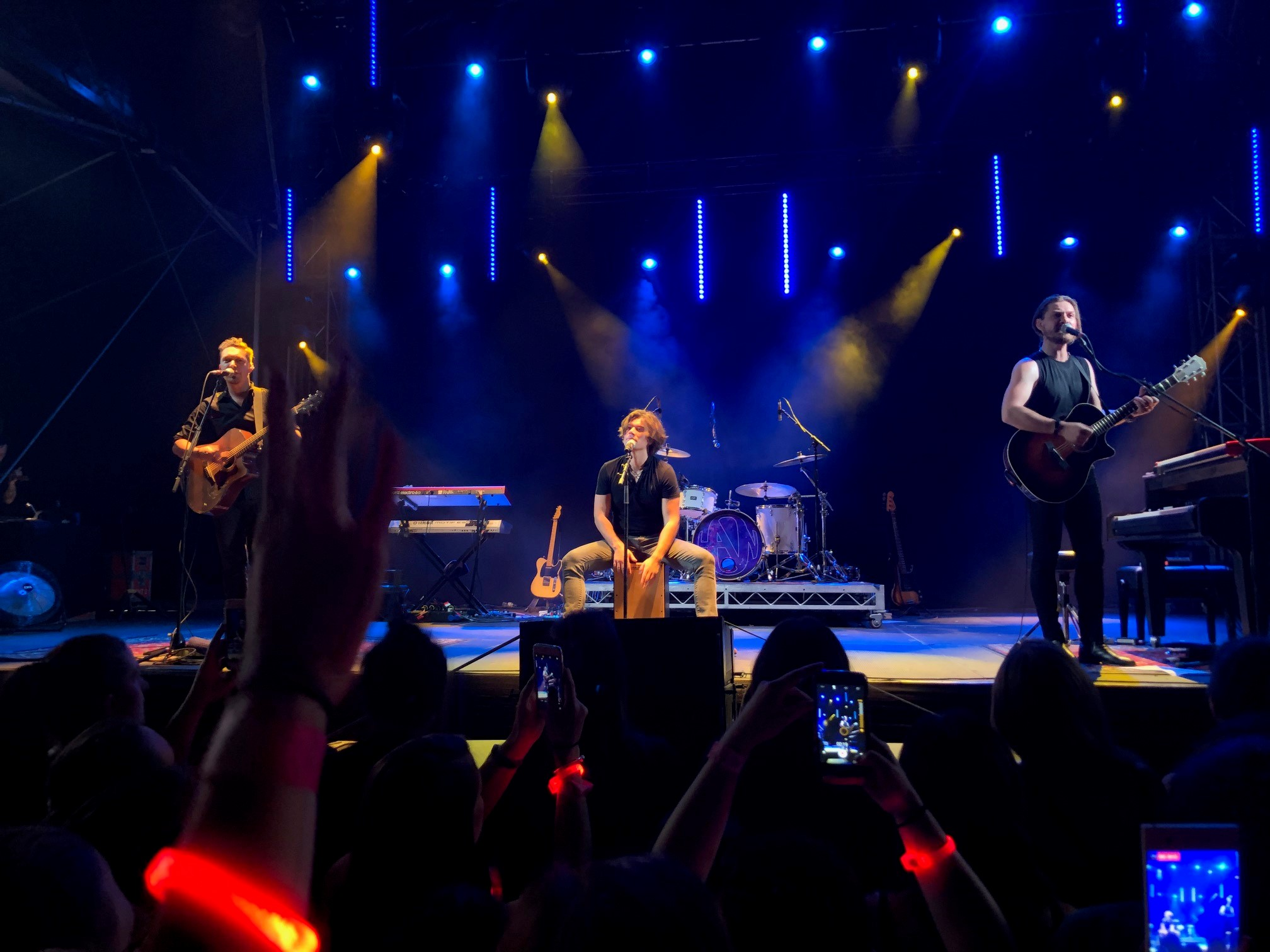
Hanson's "This Time Around" debuted at number one in April.

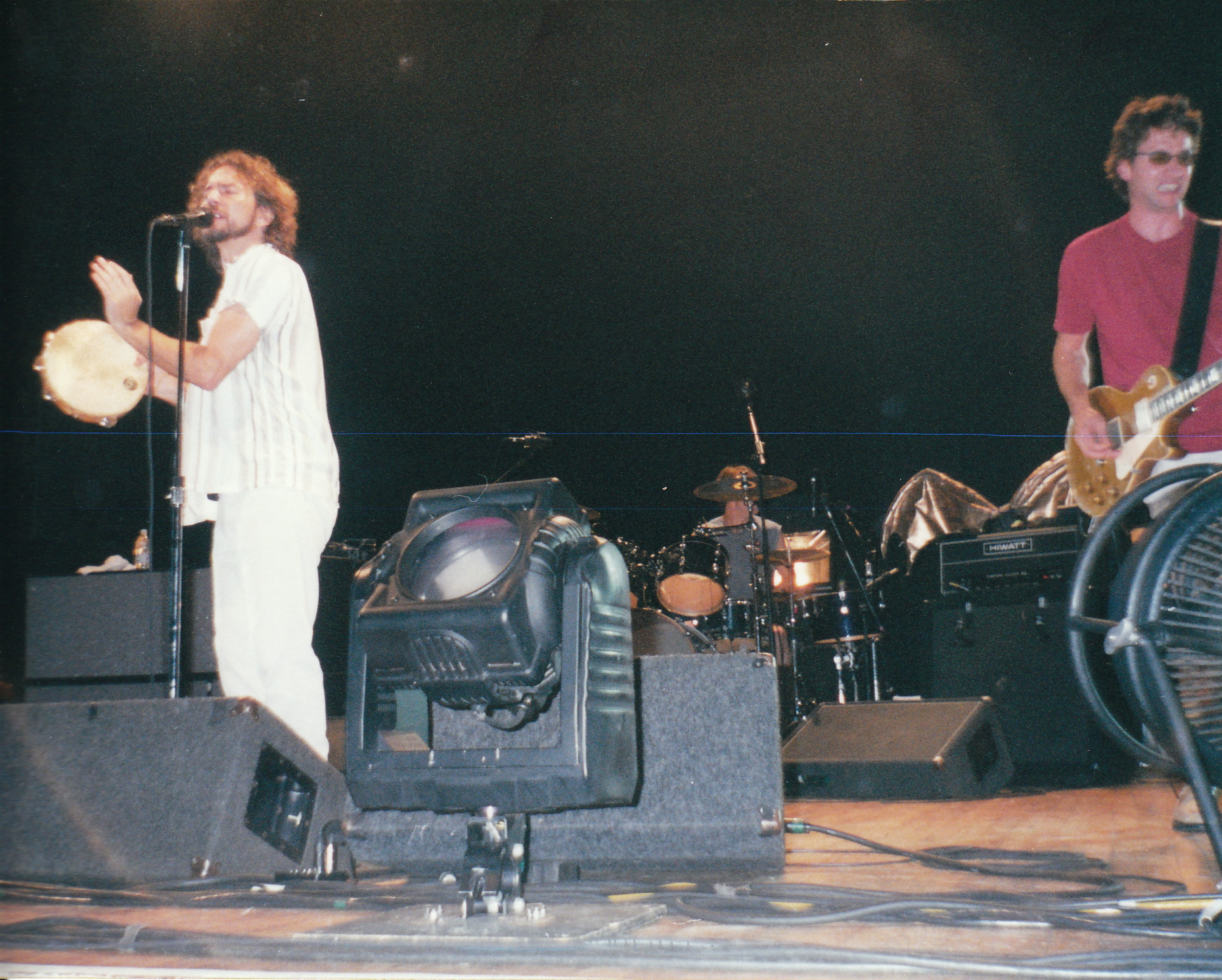
American rock band Pearl Jam topped the Canadian Singles Chart for three weeks in May with "Nothing as It Seems".

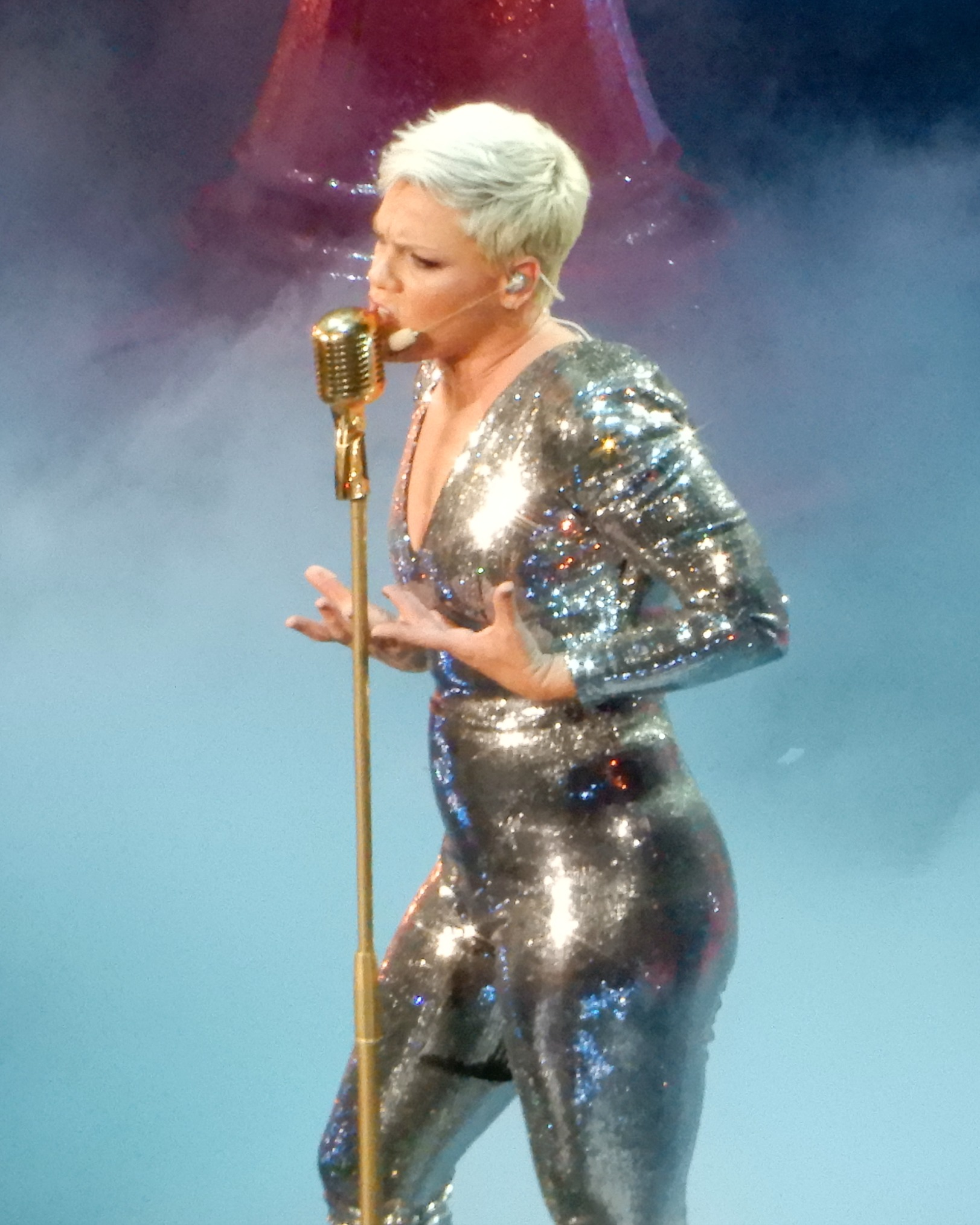
Pink's debut single, "There You Go", reached number one for a single week in June.

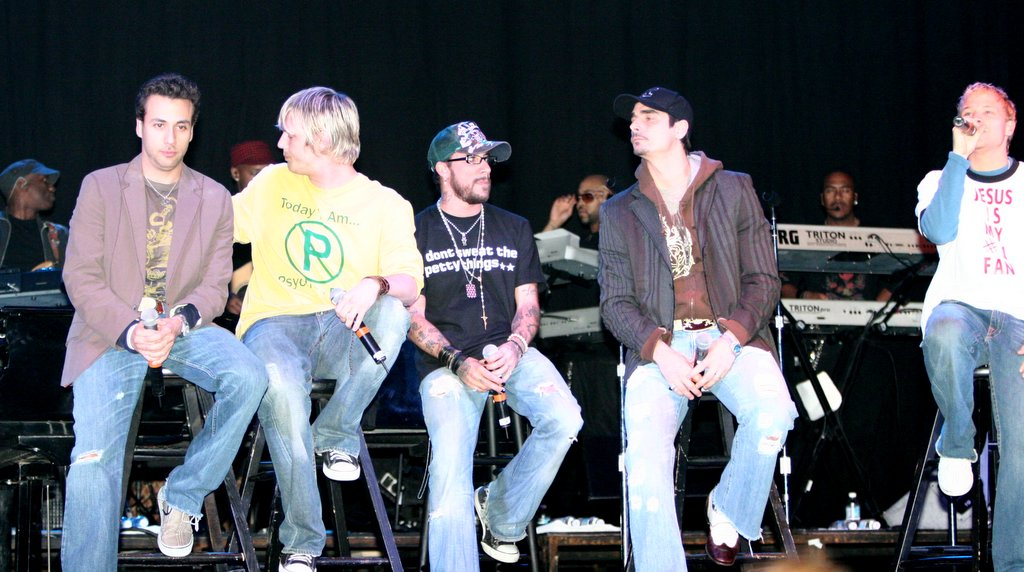
When RPM ceased publication in November, "Shape of My Heart" by Backstreet Boys was number one on the Canadian Singles Chart.

Issue date	Title	Artist	Reference
1 January	"Blue (Da Ba Dee)"	Eiffel 65	
8 January	"Blue (Da Ba Dee)"	Eiffel 65	
15 January	"Blue (Da Ba Dee)"	Eiffel 65	
22 January	"Blue (Da Ba Dee)"	Eiffel 65	
29 January	"Faded"	soulDecision featuring Thrust	
5 February	"Faded"	soulDecision featuring Thrust	
12 February	"Faded"	soulDecision featuring Thrust	
19 February	"Faded"	soulDecision featuring Thrust	
26 February	"Go Let It Out"	Oasis	
4 March	"Faded"	soulDecision featuring Thrust	
11 March	"Bye Bye Bye"	NSYNC	
18 March	"American Pie"	Madonna	
25 March	"American Pie"	Madonna	
1 April	"American Pie"	Madonna	
8 April	"American Pie"	Madonna	
15 April	"American Pie"	Madonna	
22 April	"This Time Around"	Hanson	
29 April	"American Pie"	Madonna	
6 May	"American Pie"	Madonna	
13 May	"Nothing as It Seems"	Pearl Jam	
20 May	"Nothing as It Seems"	Pearl Jam	
27 May	"Nothing as It Seems"	Pearl Jam	
3 June	"He Wasn't Man Enough"	Toni Braxton	
10 June	"He Wasn't Man Enough"	Toni Braxton	
17 June	"He Wasn't Man Enough"	Toni Braxton	
24 June	"There You Go"	Pink	
1 July	"He Wasn't Man Enough"	Toni Braxton	
8 July	"I Want You to Need Me"	Celine Dion	
15 July	"The Hampsterdance Song"	Hampton the Hampster	
22 July	"The Hampsterdance Song"	Hampton the Hampster	
29 July	"The Hampsterdance Song"	Hampton the Hampster	
5 August	"The Hampsterdance Song"	Hampton the Hampster	
12 August	"The Hampsterdance Song"	Hampton the Hampster	
19 August	"Bang Bang Boom"	The Moffatts	
26 August	"The Hampsterdance Song"	Hampton the Hampster	
2 September	"The Hampsterdance Song"	Hampton the Hampster	
9 September	"Music"	Madonna	
16 September	"Music" (import)	Madonna	
23 September	"Music" (import)	Madonna	
30 September	"Music" (import)	Madonna	
7 October	"Music" (import)	Madonna	
14 October	"Music"	Madonna	
21 October	"Music"	Madonna	
28 October	"Beautiful Day" (Part 1)	U2	
4 November	"Beautiful Day" (Part 1)	U2	
11 November	"Shape of My Heart"	Backstreet Boys	
18 November	"Shape of My Heart"	Backstreet Boys	
25 November	"Shape of My Heart"	Backstreet Boys	
2 December	"Shape of My Heart"	Backstreet Boys	
9 December	"Shape of My Heart"	Backstreet Boys	
16 December	"Shape of My Heart"	Backstreet Boys	
23 December	"Liquid Dreams"	O-Town	
30 December	"Liquid Dreams"	O-Town	

== See also ==
- 2000 in music
- List of Hot 100 number-one singles of 2000 (U.S.)
