= Why I Love You =

Why I Love You may refer to:

- "Why I Love You" (B2K song), 2002
- "Why I Love You" (Jay-Z and Kanye West song), 2011

== See also ==
- "Why Do I Love You", a song by Westlife from the 2001 album World of Our Own
- "I Love You So" ("I <3 U So", ), a song by Cassius sampled in the Kanye West and Jay-Z song
- "Sixteen Reasons (Why I Love You)", a song by Connie Francis
