= B2K (album) =

Studio album by B2K
- Released: March 12, 2002
- Genres: Teen pop, R&B
- Length: 60:27
- Label: Epic
- Producers: Bryan-Michael Cox; Beau Dozier; Jermaine Dupri; Joe N Little III; Platinum Status; Steve Russell; Tricky Stewart; Chris Stokes; Troy Taylor; Damon Thomas

B2K chronology
B2K (2002)	Santa Hooked Me Up (2002)

Singles from B2K
- 1. "Uh Huh" Released: July 17, 2001; 2. "Gots Ta Be" Released: February 26, 2002; 3. "Why I Love You" Released: May 7, 2002

B2K is the debut studio album by American boy band B2K. It was released by Epic Records on March 12, 2002 in the United States. The album debuted number 2 on the Billboard 200 and number 1 on the R&B/Hip-Hop Albums Chart selling 109,000 copies in the first week.

== Critical reception ==
Professional ratings
Review scores
Source	Rating
AllMusic	3/5 stars
Q	3/5 stars
USA Today	2.5/4 stars

AllMusic editor Jason Birchmeier rated the album three out of five stars. He noted that "overall, with the girl-magnet looks, the trendy radio-ready production, and the limitless vocal hooks, Epic Records has all the makings of pop stardom in B2K [...] The album gets progressively long-winded, running through 17 songs in total, none of them overly distinct. Of course, that's the nature of pop albums, particularly boy band albums, and B2K definitely follows in the grand tradition of its predecessors: Jagged Edge, Dru Hill, Blackstreet, and Bell Biv Devoe." Rolling Stone's Adrian Zupp called B2K a "slick though less-than-distinctive recording. Think Jagged Edge and Silk – then take three steps back." He further wrote "B2K is kind of banal and plenty sugary and obviously targeted at the G-Rated market. Considering their tender age, one would have to concede that there's promise here".

== Chart performance ==
B2K debuted number two on the US Billboard 200 and number one on the Top R&B/Hip-Hop Albums chart, selling 109,000 copies in the first week. By January 2004, the album had sold 891,000 units in the United States, according to Nielsen SoundScan.

== Track listing ==
B2K track listing
No.	Title	Writer(s)	Producer(s)	Length
1.	"Gots ta Be"	Harvey Mason, Jr.; Damon Thomas; Mischke Butler; Steven Russell	The Underdogs; Russell^{[b]}	5:21
2.	"Understanding"	Troy Taylor; Russell; Rick Williams	The Characters; Russell	3:52
3.	"Why I Love You"	Taylor; Russell; David McPherson	The Characters; Russell	4:00
4.	"Uh Huh"	Malik Crawford; Traci Hale; Christopher Stewart; Thabiso "Tab" Nkhereanye; Jarell Houston, Sr.; Dreux Frédéric	Tricky Stewart	3:43
5.	"B2K Is Hot" (Skit)	Kelton Kessee; Jerome Jones; Marques Houston; Tony Oliver; Omari Grandberry; J. Houston; Frederic; De'Mario Thornton; Malik Cox; Shawn Carter; Timothy Mosley	Platinum Status; Chris Stokes	0:35
6.	"B2K Is Hot"	Kessee; Jones; M. Houston; Oliver; Grandberry; J. Houston; Frederic; Thornton; M. Cox; Carter; Mosley	Platinum Status; Stokes	3:39
7.	"Fantasy"	Joe Little; Larry "Bingo" Marcus; M. Houston; Jones; Eric "Donovan East" Johnson; Christopher "Dip Q" Jennings; William "Tippy Swing" Lockwood	Johnson; Jennings; Lockwood^{[a]}; Casino Joe^{[a]}; Platinum Status^{[a]}	3:44
8.	"I'm Not Finished"	Demetrius Spencer; Sam Salter	Spencer; Salter^{[b]}	4:26
9.	"Come On"	Kessee; Jones; M. Houston; Oliver	The Characters; Stokes^{[b]}	4:05
10.	"Hey Little Lady" (Interlude)	Kessee; Jones; M. Houston; Oliver	Platinum Status; Stokes	0:28
11.	"Hey Little Lady"	Kessee; Jones; M. Houston; Oliver	Platinum Status; Stokes	3:52
12.	"Baby Girl"	Sam Archer; McPherson	The Characters; Stokes^{[b]}	4:50
13.	"Your Girl Chose Me"	Beau Dozier	Dozier	2:53
14.	"Shorty"	Kessee; Jones; M. Houston; Oliver	Platinum Status; Stokes	3:22
15.	"Feel This Way"	Kessee; Jones; M. Houston; Oliver; Lew Laing	Platinum Status; Stokes; Laing	3:53
16.	"Last Boyfriend"	Jermaine Dupri; Bryan Michael Cox; Kandi Burruss	Dupri; B. Cox^{[a]}	3:27
17.	"Here We Go Again"	Kessee; Jones; M. Houston; Oliver	Platinum Status; Stokes	4:07
Total length:				60:27

Notes

- ^{^[a]} denotes co-producer
- ^{^[b]} denotes vocal producer

Sample credits

- "B2K Is Hot" contains replayed elements from "Hey Papi" as written by Jay-Z, Memphis Bleek and Timbaland.

== Charts ==
=== Weekly charts ===
Weekly chart performance for B2K
Chart (2002)	Peak position
Canadian Albums (Nielsen SoundScan)	79
UK Albums (Official Charts)	186
UK R&B Albums (Official Charts)	32
US Billboard 200	2
US Top R&B/Hip-Hop Albums (Billboard)	1

=== Year-end charts ===
Year-end chart performance for B2K
Chart (2002)	Position
Canadian R&B Albums (Nielsen SoundScan)	103
US Billboard 200	98
US Top R&B/Hip-Hop Albums (Billboard)	42

== Certifications ==
Certifications and sales for B2K
Region	Certification	Certified units/sales
United States (RIAA)	Gold	500,000^{^}
^{^} Shipments figures based on certification alone.

== See also ==
- List of Billboard number-one R&B albums of 2002
