= Trevor Guthrie =

Canadian singer (born 1973)

- Born: Trevor Dean Guthrie; 11 February 1973 (age 53); North Vancouver, British Columbia, Canada
- Origin: Vancouver, British Columbia, Canada
- Genres: Pop; dance; rock
- Occupations: Singer; songwriter
- Years active: 1993–present
- Labels: MCA (1999–2002); Sextant (2002–2005); Interscope (2005–present)
- Website: trevorguthrie.com

Trevor Dean Guthrie (born 11 February 1973) is a Canadian singer, songwriter and the former lead singer of the pop group soulDecision. He is currently based in Gdańsk, Poland.

== Early years ==
Trevor Guthrie was born in North Vancouver, British Columbia. At age 3, he was playing the piano. He played his first concert at age 4. In high school at Argyle Secondary School, he began playing the guitar and writing music. He can also speak French, Spanish, Russian, German, Mandarin, and Japanese.

== Music career ==
=== 1993–2005: soulDecision ===
After a name change and a new record company, MCA, the pop group in which Guthrie was lead, Indecision (as they were named from 1993 to 1998) emerged as soulDecision in 1999 and released the single "Faded" in 2000 under their new moniker. The song became a #1 hit in Canada and a top 25 hit in the United States. The success of that single was followed by the smash hit "Ooh It's Kinda Crazy". The album No One Does It Better, which was recorded in Velvet Sound Studios in Sydney, Australia, went on to sell over a million copies. After a four-year hiatus and a label change, soulDecision released the single "Cadillac Dress". The single was a moderate radio hit. They released their second album Shady Satin Drug in November 2004. Due to a lack of support from the Canadian music industry, less than 2000 copies were printed and available for sale. Shady Satin Drug, however, spawned two more singles, "Hypnotize" and "Kiss the Walls".

=== 2008–present: Solo career ===
In 2015, Guthrie released a song titled "Strong Hands", inspired by stories of World War II veterans. He is featured on Markus Schulz's track "Until It's Gone" (2012), Armin van Buuren's track "This Is What It Feels Like" (2013), R3hab's track "Soundwave" (2014), Alan Walker's track "Do It All for You" (2018), and Brennan Heart's hardstyle track "Won't Hold Me Down (Gravity)" (2018).

== Discography ==
=== Singles ===
==== As lead artist ====
Title	Year	Peak chart position				Album
Title	Year	CAN	CAN AC	CAN CHR	CAN HAC	Album
"Soundwave" (original or R3hab remix)	2014	31	11	8	8	Non-album singles
"Summertime"	2015	46	24	19	18	Non-album singles
"Strong Hands"	2015	—	—	—	49	Non-album singles
"Wanted"	2016	—	47	22	29	Non-album singles
"Lightning" (with Domeno)	2020	—	—	46	—	35mm (The Prelude)
"—" denotes a recording that did not chart or was not released.

==== As featured artist ====
Title	Year	Peak chart positions							Certifications	Album
Title	Year	CAN	AUS	AUT	BEL	IRE	NLD	UK	Certifications	Album
"This Is What It Feels Like" (Armin van Buuren featuring Trevor Guthrie)	2013	6	13	7	8	32	2	6	NVPI: 2× Platinum; ARIA: Platinum; BEA: Gold; MC: 3× Platinum; FIMI: Platinum; BPI: Gold	Intense
"Let it Go" (Laidback Luke featuring Trevor Guthrie)	2015	77	—	—	—	—	—	—		Focus
"Dreamer" (Axwell Λ Ingrosso featuring Trevor Guthrie)	2017	—	—	20	65	—	—	—	GLF: Platinum	More Than You Know
"Won't Hold Me Down (Gravity)" (Brennan Heart featuring Trevor Guthrie)	2018	—	—	—	—	—	—	—		Non-album singles
"Summer Air" (Hardwell featuring Trevor Guthrie)	2019	—	—	—	63	—	—	—		Non-album singles
"—" denotes a recording that did not chart or was not released.

=== Guest appearances ===
Title	Year	Other artist(s)	Album
"Do It All for You"	2018	Alan Walker	Different World

== Awards and nominations ==
=== Grammy Awards ===
Year	Category	Work	Outcome	Ref.
2014	Best Dance Recording	"This Is What It Feels Like"	Nominated	

=== International Dance Music Awards ===
Year	Category	Work	Outcome	Ref.
2014	Best Trance Track	"This Is What It Feels Like"	Won	
2014	Best Featured Vocalist	"This Is What It Feels Like"	Won	
2014	Best Music Video	"This Is What It Feels Like"	Won	
