= List of Billboard number-one R&B albums of 2002 =

These are the albums that reached number one on the Billboard Top R&B/Hip-Hop Albums chart in 2002.

== Chart history ==
Issue date	Album	Artist	Ref
January 5	Stillmatic	Nas	
January 12	Stillmatic	Nas	
January 19	Stillmatic	Nas	
January 26	Stillmatic	Nas	
February 2	Stillmatic	Nas	
February 9	Stillmatic	Nas	
February 16	State Property	Soundtrack / Various artists	
February 23	J to tha L–O!: The Remixes	Jennifer Lopez	
March 2	Word of Mouf	Ludacris	
March 9	The Rebirth of Kirk Franklin	Kirk Franklin	
March 16	The Rebirth of Kirk Franklin	Kirk Franklin	
March 23	Full Moon	Brandy	
March 30	B2K	B2K	
April 6	The Best of Both Worlds	R. Kelly and Jay-Z	
April 13	The Best of Both Worlds	R. Kelly and Jay-Z	
April 20	Ashanti	Ashanti	
April 27	Ashanti	Ashanti	
May 4	Ashanti	Ashanti	
May 11	Ashanti	Ashanti	
May 18	Hood Rich	Big Tymers	
May 25	Juslisen	Musiq Soulchild	
June 1	Come Home with Me	Cam'ron	
June 8	The Eminem Show	Eminem	
June 15	The Eminem Show	Eminem	
June 22	The Eminem Show	Eminem	
June 29	The Eminem Show	Eminem	
July 6	The Eminem Show	Eminem	
July 13	Nellyville	Nelly	
July 20	Nellyville	Nelly	
July 27	Nellyville	Nelly	
August 3	Nellyville	Nelly	
August 10	500 Degreez	Lil Wayne	
August 17	Nellyville	Nelly	
August 24	The Fix	Scarface	
August 31	The Fix	Scarface	
September 7	Lord Willin'	Clipse	
September 14	Eve-Olution	Eve	
September 21	The Eminem Show	Eminem	
September 28	The Eminem Show	Eminem	
October 5	Golden Grain	Disturbing tha Peace	
October 12	Voyage to India	India.Arie	
October 19	Man vs. Machine	Xzibit	
October 26	Man vs. Machine	Xzibit	
November 2	10	LL Cool J	
November 9	10	LL Cool J	
November 16	8 Mile	Soundtrack / Shady Records	
November 23	8 Mile	Soundtrack / Shady Records	
November 30	The Blueprint 2: The Gift & The Curse	Jay-Z	
December 7	The Blueprint 2: The Gift & The Curse	Jay-Z	
December 14	Better Dayz	2Pac	
December 21	Better Dayz	2Pac	
December 28	I Care 4 U	Aaliyah	

== See also ==
- 2002 in music
- R&B number-one hits of 2002 (USA)
