= Faded (soulDecision song) =

1999 single by soulDecision

Single by soulDecision featuring Thrust

from the album No One Does It Better
- Released: 1999
- Genre: Pop · pop rap · disco
- Length: 3:29
- Label: Universal Music Canada
- Composer: Trevor Guthrie
- Producers: Charles Fisher; Femi Jiya; soulDecision

SoulDecision featuring Thrust singles chronology
"Ooh It's Kinda Crazy" (1998)	"Faded" (1999)	"No One Does It Better" (2000)

"Faded" is a song by Canadian pop group soulDecision. Written by lead singer Trevor Guthrie and produced by Charles Fisher, soulDecision, and Femi Jiya, it was recorded for their debut studio album No One Does It Better (2000). The song features Canadian rapper Thrust. It was first released in 1999 in Canada, before garnering a release to the United States on May 9, 2000, and later in Australia in late 2000; in America and Australia, it was the group's debut single.

It was a hit single in their home country, topping the RPM 100 Singles chart. In the United States, it became their biggest hit, peaking at number 22 on the Billboard Hot 100 and also peaked at number 23 in Australia. It would go on to be nominated for Best Single at the 2001 Juno Awards, losing to Nelly Furtado's "I'm Like a Bird".

== Versions ==
"Faded" has three versions: one with the beginning lyrics "When I get you all alone, I'm gonna take off all your clothes"; an edited version with "When I get you all alone, I'm gonna move in nice and close"; and a third version featuring a verse by rapper Thrust.

== Music video ==
The video was shot in Vancouver in an apartment building having various rooms. One room was a house party, another of soulDecision performing in an all white room, and another of the band singing together. The video was released in 1999 in Canada and then internationally in 2000. The video reached the number four spot on MTV's Total Request Live and number five on The MuchMusic Top 20 Countdown.

== Chart performance ==
In the group's home country, "Faded" debuted on the RPM Adult Contemporary Tracks chart at number 76 the week of December 13, 1999. It would go on to debut on the mainline RPM 100 Singles chart the week of December 20, 1999 at number 66. It topped the chart on March 10, 2000, displacing "Show Me the Meaning of Being Lonely" by the Backstreet Boys.

In the United States, the song debuted on the Billboard Hot 100 the week of July 8, 2000, at number 94. It rose to number 22, becoming the band's only chart entry in the United States. It was a bigger hit on other component charts, peaking at number six on the Billboard Mainstream Top 40. The song was also released to Australia, where it reached number 23 on February 11, 2001. "Faded" is to date, soulDecision's biggest hit.

== Track listing ==
All tracks are written by Trevor Guthrie.

US CD and cassette single
No.	Title	Length
1.	"Faded" (Radio Version featuring Thrust)	3:28
2.	"Faded" (22 Green Club Mix Radio Edit)	3:29

Canada CD single
No.	Title	Length
1.	"Faded" (Radio Version featuring Thrust)	3:28
2.	"Faded" (Album Version featuring Thrust)	3:29
3.	"Faded" (22 Green Club Mix Radio Edit)	3:29

Canada 12" promo vinyl
No.	Title	Producer(s)	Length
1.	"Faded" (Album Version)		3:29
2.	"Faded" (Morning Sun Dubly)	Mark Ryan	7:15
3.	"Faded" (22 Green Club Mix)	Ryan	9:05
4.	"Faded" (22 Green Club Radio Mix)	Ryan	3:29

== Charts ==
Chart performance for "Faded"
Chart (1999–2000)	Peak position
Australia (ARIA)	23
Canada Top Singles (RPM)	1
Canada (Nielsen SoundScan)	1
US Billboard Hot 100	22
US Adult Pop Airplay (Billboard)	31
US Pop Airplay (Billboard)	6
US Billboard Top 40 Tracks	20
US Hot Adult Contemporary (Radio & Records)	25

=== Year-end charts ===
Year-end chart performance for "Faded"
Chart (2000)	Position
US Billboard Hot 100	66

== Release history ==
Release dates and format(s) for "Faded"
Region	Date	Format(s)	Label(s)	Ref.
Canada	1999	CD single	Universal Music Canada	
United States	March 21, 2000	CD; cassette single	MCA Records	
United States	May 9, 2000	Contemporary hit radio	MCA Records	
United States	October 2, 2000	Hot adult contemporary radio	MCA Records	
