= No One Does It Better (album) =

2000 studio album by soulDecision

Studio album by soulDecision
- Released: February 22, 2000 (Canada); June 27, 2000 (United States)
- Recorded: 1998–1999
- Genre: Pop; R&B; soul
- Length: 41:22
- Label: MCA
- Producer: Charles Fisher; Trevor Guthrie

SoulDecision chronology
No One Does It Better (2000)	Shady Satin Drug (2004)

Singles from No One Does It Better
- 1. "Ooh It's Kinda Crazy" Released: 1998; 2. "Faded" Released: 1999; 3. "No One Does It Better" Released: 2000; 4. "Gravity" Released: 2000; 5. "Let's Do It Right" Released: 2001

Professional ratings
Review scores
Source	Rating
AllMusic	2/5 stars
The Morning Call	positive
The Pitch	mixed

No One Does It Better is the debut studio album by Canadian pop group soulDecision. The album was recorded in 1999 and released in 2000. The album reached number one on the Billboard Heatseekers chart. No One Does It Better has sold over one million copies worldwide.

== Track listing ==
All tracks are written by Trevor Guthrie except where noted.

No.	Title	Writer(s)	Length
1.	"Ooh It's Kinda Crazy"		4:20
2.	"No One Does It Better"		3:41
3.	"I Don't Need Anyone"		3:10
4.	"Feelin' You"	Guthrie; Preston Glass; David Bowman; Ken Lewko	4:03
5.	"Faded"		3:29
6.	"Let's Do It Right"	Guthrie; Giuliano Franco	4:02
7.	"Only in My Mind"	Guthrie; Lewko; Chris Lowe; Neil Tennant	4:13
8.	"Stay"	Guthrie; Lewko	3:39
9.	"Baby Come Back"		4:31
10.	"Gravity"	Lewko	3:18
11.	"Next Time"	Guthrie; Lewko; Chris Percy	2:44

== Charts ==
=== Weekly charts ===
2000 weekly chart performance
Chart (2000)	Peak position
Canadian Albums (SoundScan)	7

=== Year-end charts ===
2000 year-end chart performance
Chart (2000)	Position
Canadian Albums (SoundScan)	66

== Certifications ==
Region	Certification	Certified units/sales
Canada (Music Canada)	Platinum	100,000^{^}
^{^} Shipments figures based on certification alone.
