= Ooh It's Kinda Crazy =

Single by soulDecision

from the album No One Does It Better
- Released: 1998; August 2000 (re-release)
- Genre: Pop soul
- Length: 4:21
- Label: MCA
- Songwriter: Trevor Guthrie
- Producer: Trevor Guthrie

SoulDecision singles chronology
"No One Does It Better" (2000)	"Ooh It's Kinda Crazy" (1998)	"Gravity" (2000)

"Ooh It's Kinda Crazy" is a song by Canadian pop group soulDecision, originally released in 1998 as an independent single when the band was known as Indecision. It was re-released in August 2000 as the third single from their debut album No One Does It Better, and it was released to Contemporary hit radio in the United States on January 23, 2001. The pop soul song drew comparisons to George Michael's 1996 single "Fastlove".

The single attained a peak of number 18 in the group's native Canada, as well as charting in Australia and the United States. Its accompanying music video employs cartoonish effects and depicts the group fleeing enthusiastic fans by using disguises. The video peaked at number one on MTV's Total Request Live, and is retrospectively regarded as an unlikely chart topper. It also reached the top 30 most-played videos in MTV's weekly rotation.

== Composition ==
The Village Voice music critic Marc Weisblott regarded the song as similar to George Michael's "Fastlove", commenting that if Michael's song "was a doughnut, then 'Ooh It's Kinda Crazy' supplants Michael's coquettish cream with a doughy standoffishness". In a review of No One Does It Better, AllMusic critic Vince Ripol named the song the album's best track, calling it "deceptively impressive" and praising it for combining elements of "Fastlove" with their pop-soul sound "without sounding overly derivative".

== Commercial performance ==
"Ooh Its Kinda Crazy" reached number 45 on the Canadian RPM Singles Chart. when first released in 1998. The song gained significantly on the chart when re-released in 2000, reaching number 18 on the chart dated August 18, 2000. The song peaked at number 111 in the United States, via the Bubbling Under Hot 100 singles chart, an extension of the Hot 100.

== Music video ==
The music video imagines a world where soulDecision are so popular that they can't walk down the street unnoticed. The video opens with Dave Bowman waking up in bed, with MTV retrospectively commenting that it was one of many videos from the time "that start off with a skater dude waking up in bed". The group proceeds to use disguises, such as fake mustaches compared to the Village People biker's, to outrun rabid fans. The video also incorporates cartoonish elements, such as using a hammer to turn off an alarm clock, as well as newspapers with the headline "SoulDecision at large!"

The video went into rotation on MTV the week ending January 28, 2001. It also peaked at number one on MTV's Total Request Live, topping the chart for one day. It further reached number 27 on MTV's ranking of most-played videos, for the week ending February 11, 2001. In 2018, Billboard ranked it the eighth-best boy band music video of the TRL era, commenting that it resembles "a Looney Tunes clip". The song is retrospectively regarded as an unlikely TRL chart-topper, with Uproxx referring to it as an "oddity" and MTV including it in a list of "11 Music Videos You Won't Believe Topped 'TRL' Back In The Day".

== Track listing ==
Canada promo single

- 1 "Ooh It's Kinda Crazy" (22 Green radio mix) – 4:08
- 2 "Ooh It's Kinda Crazy" (22 Green club mix) – 9:39
- 3 "Ooh It's Kinda Crazy" (22 Green club mix – instrumental) – 9:39

Canada vinyl, 12", promo

- A1 "Ooh It's Kinda Crazy" (22 Green club mix) – 9:40
- A2 "Ooh It's Kinda Crazy" (22 Green radio mix) – 4:08
- B1 "Ooh It's Kinda Crazy" (22 Green club mix – instrumental) – 9:40
- B2 "Ooh It's Kinda Crazy" (22 Green radio mix – instrumental) – 4:08

The 22 Green remixes were reproduced and mixed by Mark Ryan.

== Charts ==
Chart performance for "Ooh It's Kinda Crazy"
Chart (2000–2001)	Peak position
Australia (ARIA)	49
Canada Top Singles (RPM)	18
US Bubbling Under Hot 100 (Billboard)	11
US Pop Airplay (Billboard)	26
