= Uh Huh (B2K song) =

Single by B2K

from the album B2K
- Released: July 17, 2001
- Recorded: 2001
- Genre: R&B; dance-pop
- Length: 3:43 (album version); 3:10 (radio version)
- Label: Epic
- Songwriters: Malik Crawford, Traci Hale, Christopher "Tricky" Stewart
- Producer: Tricky Stewart

B2K singles chronology
| "Uh Huh" (2001) | "Gots ta Be" (2002) |

"Uh Huh" is the first single by R&B group B2K, from their self-titled debut album. The song was released in July 2001 and it peaked at number 37 on the Billboard Hot 100 and number 20 on the Hot R&B/Hip-Hop Songs. It also peaked at number 35 in the UK on its first entry and reached a new peak at number 31 on a re-release.

== Music video ==
In the music video, directed by Erik White, B2K are dancing in a room with a background of speakers and they are wearing zipped vests showing their bodies in the video. There are also girls dancing in the video. It also features Jhene Aiko (who at the time was marketed as Lil' Fizz's cousin).

== Charts ==
=== Weekly charts ===
Weekly chart performance for "Uh Huh" by B2k
| Chart (2001–2002) | Peak position |
|---|---|
| Australia (ARIA) | 41 |
| Australian Urban (ARIA) | 12 |
| Belgium (Ultratop 50 Flanders) | 50 |
| Canada (Nielsen SoundScan) | 4 |
| France (SNEP) | 80 |
| Ireland (IRMA) | 38 |
| Scotland Singles (OCC) | 51 |
| UK Singles (OCC) | 31 |
| UK Hip Hop/R&B (OCC) | 7 |
| US Billboard Hot 100 | 37 |
| US Hot R&B/Hip-Hop Songs (Billboard) | 20 |
| US Pop Airplay (Billboard) | 21 |
| US Rhythmic Airplay (Billboard) | 14 |

=== Year-end charts ===
Year-end chart performance for "Uh Huh" by B2k
| Chart (2002) | Position |
|---|---|
| Canada (Nielsen SoundScan) | 97 |
| US Billboard Hot 100 | 90 |
| US Hot R&B/Hip-Hop Songs (Billboard) | 78 |
