= Gots ta Be =

Single by B2K

from the album B2K
- Released: February 26, 2002
- Recorded: 2001
- Genre: R&B
- Length: 4:21 (Radio Edit); 5:22 (Album Edit)
- Label: Epic
- Songwriters: Harvey Mason, Jr., Damon Thomas, Steven Russell, Mischke Butler
- Producer: The Underdogs

B2K singles chronology
"Uh Huh" (2001)	"Gots ta Be" (2002)	"Why I Love You" (2002)

"Gots ta Be" is the second single by R&B group B2K off their self-titled debut album. The song was released in February 26, 2002 and it peaked at number 17 on the Billboard Hot 100 and number 13 on the Hot R&B/Hip-Hop Songs.

== Music video ==
The video was directed by Dave Meyers. It was released on iTunes on April 28, 2003.

== Formats and track listing ==
- US 12"
  - A1. "Gots Ta Be" (Radio Edit) – 4:17
  - A2. "Gots Ta Be" (Instrumental) – 5:22
  - A3. "Gots Ta Be" (Acappella) – 5:03
  - B1. "Gots Ta Be" (Remix) (featuring Nazkar) – :56
  - B2. "Gots Ta Be" (Album Version) – 5:21
  - B3. "Gots Ta Be" (Instrumental) – 5:22
- US 12" promo (remixes)
  - A1. "Gots Ta Be" (Clue/Duro Remix) – 4:17
  - A2. "Gots Ta Be" (Platinum Status Remix) – 2:57
  - A3. "Gots Ta Be" (Allegro Love Remix) – 3:44
  - B1. "Gots Ta Be" (Clue/Duro Remix Instrumental) – 4:17
  - B2. "Gots Ta Be" (Platinum Status Remix Instrumental) – 2:57
  - B3. "Gots Ta Be" (Allegro Love Remix Instrumental) – 3:44
- US promo CD
  - 1. "Gots Ta Be" (Radio Edit) – 4:17
  - 2. "Gots Ta Be" (Instrumental) – 5:22
  - 3. "Gots Ta Be" (Acappella) – 5:03
  - 4. "Gots Ta Be" (Call Out Hook) – 0:15

== Weekly charts ==
Chart (2002)	Peak position
US Billboard Hot 100	17
US Hot R&B/Hip-Hop Songs (Billboard)	13
US Rhythmic Airplay (Billboard)	14

Year-end charts

Chart (2002)	Peak position
US Hot R&B/Hip-Hop Songs (Billboard)	56
