= Thrust (rapper) =

- Birth name: Christopher France
- Born: July 8, 1976 (age 49)
- Origin: Toronto, Ontario, Canada
- Genres: Hip hop
- Occupation(s): Rapper, songwriter
- Instrument: Vocals
- Years active: 1996–present

Christopher France (born July 8, 1976), better known by his stage name Thrust, is a Canadian rapper from Toronto, Ontario. He is most known for his appearance on the Rascalz' 1998 single "Northern Touch," which also features Kardinal Offishall, Choclair, and Checkmate. He was also featured on the pop band soulDecision's biggest hit "Faded". Thrust has taught an Artist Series at the Harris Institute of Music in Toronto.

In 1994 he was featured in Andrew Munger's documentary film Make Some Noise.

== Discography ==
- Past, Present, Future (1996)
- The Chosen Are Few (2001)
- Thrust OG x BoFaat - Like its 1994 (2021 BoFaat Music)
- Thrust OG x BoFaat - Broken Arrow (Black Buffalo Records 2022)

== See also ==
- Canadian hip hop
- ”Northern Touch”
