= Why I Love You (B2K song) =

Single by B2K

from the album B2K and Pandemonium!
- Released: May 14, 2002
- Recorded: 2001
- Genre: Pop; R&B
- Length: 4:00
- Label: Epic
- Songwriter(s): Troy Taylor, Charles Farrar, David McPherson, Steven L Russell
- Producer(s): Troy Taylor

B2K singles chronology
"Gots ta Be" (2002)	"Why I Love You" (2002)	"Bump, Bump, Bump" (2002)

Music video
- "Why I Love You" on YouTube

"Why I Love You" is the third single from B2K their self-titled debut album and the song was released in May 2002 and it peaked at number 73 on the Billboard Hot 100 and number 19 on the Hot R&B/Hip-Hop Songs. The song is also featured on the group's second album, Pandemonium!.

== Music video ==
Directed by Erik White, the video shows the guys are playing at a basketball court with their label mates IMx wearing the original Laker jerseys and Omarion is singing to the late Naya Rivera in the basketball court as she walks away from him. The guys are also wearing jean jackets unbuttoned all the way to the bottom showing their bodies. In another scene, the guys put on a show outside wearing matching red and black leather jackets. There are also scenes of Lil' Fizz sitting down singing the chorus with recording artist Jhené (who at the time was marketed as his cousin and makes a cameo as his girlfriend), while they are sitting down on the bleachers with rottweilers. TG4, IMx and actress Kat Graham make cameos as well.

== Weekly charts ==
Chart (2002)	Peak position
US Billboard Hot 100	73
US Hot R&B/Hip-Hop Songs (Billboard)	19
