= SoulDecision =

Pop band from Canada

soulDecision
- Origin: Vancouver, British Columbia, Canada
- Genres: Pop; R&B; rock; pop rock
- Years active: 1993–2005
- Labels: MCA; Sextant
- Past members: Trevor Guthrie; David Bowman; Ken Lewko; James Reid; Stephen McGrath; Tino Zolfo

soulDecision was a Canadian pop band from Vancouver that was active between 1993 and 2005. They are best known for the single, "Faded", which hit number-one in Canada in 2000, and "Ooh It's Kinda Crazy", which reached the top 20 in Canada the following year.

== History ==
The group was formed in Vancouver, British Columbia, under the name Indecision by singer and multi-instrumentalist Trevor Guthrie, singer David Bowman, and keyboardist Ken Lewko, who were studying music together at Capilano College. Before signing a record deal, they released singles that received national top 40 radio airplay. The success of those singles led to a record deal with Universal Music. Due to a name conflict with an American band, they changed their name from Indecision, allowing their manager, Garry Francis, to choose the name soulDecision.

Launched at the height of the boy band era, the group wrote their own songs and played their own instruments. Their first studio album, No One Does It Better, was recorded at Velvet Sound Studios in Sydney, Australia, and released in Canada on February 22, 2000. The album's lead single, "Faded", combined pop and R&B and featured a rap verse by Thrust. It reached number one on Canada's RPM Top Singles chart and number 22 in the United States. The follow-up single, "Ooh It's Kinda Crazy", also achieved success in North America and became the most requested video on MTV's Total Request Live. In 2018, Billboard included its video in "The 10 Greatest Boy Band Videos of the TRL Era".

In July 2000, the group toured Canada as part of YTV's Psykoblast Tour, supporting Christina Aguilera. They headlined the Canadian tour in 2001. In late 2000, they toured alongside Destiny's Child as a support act for Aguilera's Genie in a Bottle Tour throughout North America. They also supported NSYNC on the eastern North American dates of the second leg of the No Strings Attached Tour in 2000.

The band departed Universal and released their second album, Shady Satin Drug, in 2004 through Sextant. The album's first single, "Cadillac Dress", was released as a download from the band's website.

SoulDecision disbanded following their final Canadian tour in 2005. In a 2014 interview, Guthrie attributed the split to exhaustion and financial difficulties.

== Discography ==
=== Studio albums ===
List of studio albums, with selected details, chart positions and certifications
Title	Album details	Peak chart positions		Certifications (sales threshold)
Title	Album details	CAN	US	Certifications (sales threshold)
No One Does It Better	Released: February 22, 2000; Label: MCA	7	103	MC: Platinum
Shady Satin Drug	Released: October 26, 2004; Label: Sextant	—	—	
"—" denotes releases that did not chart

=== Singles ===
List of singles, with selected chart positions
Title	Year	Chart positions			Album
Title	Year	CAN	AUS	US	Album
"Tonight"	1997	—	—	—	Non-album Single
"Not Enough"	1997	—	—	—	Non-album Single
"Ooh It's Kinda Crazy"	1998	45	—	111	Non-album Single
"Faded" (featuring Thrust)	1999	1	23	22	No One Does It Better
"No One Does It Better"	2000	10	—	—	No One Does It Better
"Ooh It's Kinda Crazy" (re-release)	2000	18	49	—	No One Does It Better
"Gravity"	2000	13	—	—	No One Does It Better
"Let's Do It Right"	2001	10	—	—	No One Does It Better
"Cadillac Dress"	2004	44	—	—	Shady Satin Drug
"Kiss the Walls"	2004	—	—	—	Shady Satin Drug
"Hypnotize"	2004	—	—	—	Shady Satin Drug
