= B2K discography =

- Studio albums: 3
- Soundtrack albums: 1
- Compilation albums: 2
- Singles: 12
- Music videos: 6

American boy band B2K has released 3 studio albums, eleven singles, two compilation albums, two remix albums and one soundtrack album.

B2K released their debut studio album, B2K, in March 2002. It included the singles "Uh Huh", "Gots Ta Be" and "Why I Love You". The album sold well enough in its first week to enter the US Billboard 200 at number 2 and the Top R&B/Hip-Hop Albums chart at number 1. The bands only Christmas album, Santa Hooked Me Up, was released in October 2002 and reached number 132 on the Billboard 200. One single, "Why'd You Leave Me on Christmas" was released. Pandemonium!, the bands second studio album was released in March 2003. It peaked at number 10 on the Billboard 200, the album's first single, "Bump, Bump, Bump" (featuring P. Diddy) reached number 1 on the Billboard Hot 100.

== Albums ==
=== Studio albums ===
Year	Album details	Peak chart positions							Certifications (sales threshold)
Year	Album details	US	US R&B	AUS	FRA	NL	SWI	UK	Certifications (sales threshold)
2002	B2K: Release date: March 12, 2002; Label: Epic Records	2	1	—	—	—	—	186	RIAA: Gold
2003	Pandemonium!: Release date: March 25, 2003; Label: Epic Records	10	3	50	57	64	60	35	RIAA: Platinum; BPI: Silver
2026	Eclipse: Release date: November 6, 2026; Label: BPC Music Group	—	—	—	—	—	—	—	
"—" denotes releases that did not chart

=== Christmas albums ===
Title	Album details
Santa Hooked Me Up	Released: October 29, 2002; Label: Epic Records

=== Compilation albums ===
Year	Album details	Peak positions
Year	Album details	US R&B
2004	B2K Greatest Hits: Release date: March 24, 2004; Label: Epic Records	76
2006	B2K Is Hot! Boys of the Millennium: Release date: July 6, 2006; Label: Epic Records	—
"—" denotes releases that did not chart

=== Remix albums ===
Year	Album details	Peak chart positions	
Year	Album details	US	US R&B
2002	B2K: The Remixes - Volume 1: Release date: March 12, 2002; Label: Epic Records	129	47
2003	The Remixes - Volume 2: Release date: July 1, 2003; Label: Epic Records	192	38

=== Soundtrack album ===
Year	Album details	Peak chart positions				Certifications (sales threshold)
Year	Album details	US	US R&B	US Sound	AUS	Certifications (sales threshold)
2003	You Got Served: Release date: December 23, 2003; Label: Epic Records	34	7	2	71	RIAA: Gold; WW: 600,000

== Singles ==
Year	Single	Peak chart positions										Album
Year	Single	US	US R&B	US Pop	US Adult	AUS	CAN	FRA	NL	SWI	UK	Album
2001	"Uh Huh"	37	20	21	22	41	4	80	—	—	31	B2K
2002	"Gots Ta Be"	17	13	—	—	—	—	—	—	—	—	B2K
2002	"Why I Love You"	73	19	—	—	—	—	—	—	—	—	B2K
2002	"Bump, Bump, Bump" (featuring P. Diddy)	1	2	3	4	4	—	7	8	2	11	Pandemonium!
2003	"Girlfriend"	30	19	—	—	39	47	—	48	19	10	Pandemonium!
2003	"What a Girl Wants"	—	47	—	—	—	—	—	—	—	—	Pandemonium!
2004	"Badaboom" (featuring Fabolous)	59	29	—	—	—	—	20	62	—	26	You Got Served
2004	"Do That Thing" (featuring Lil' Kim)	—	63	—	—	—	—	—	—	—	—	You Got Served
2026	"Mileage"	—	—	—	—	—	—	—	—	—	—	Eclipse
"—" denotes releases that did not chart
