= Raz-B =

American contemporary R&B singer

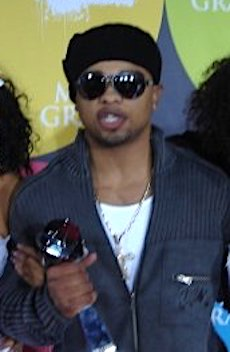
- Raz B in 2012

Background information
- Born: De'Mario Monte Thornton; June 13, 1985 (age 41); Cleveland, Ohio, U.S.
- Genres: R&B, hip-hop
- Occupations: Singer; actor; rapper
- Instrument: Vocals
- Years active: 1998–present
- Member of: B2K

De'Mario Monte Thornton (born June 13, 1985), known professionally as Raz-B, is an American singer, rapper and actor. He is a founding member of R&B boy band B2K.

== Career ==
Born in Cleveland, Ohio, Raz B was a creator and member of the group B2K as a teen. During his time in the group, B2K released their album, Pandemonium!, and performed on an accompanying tour. The group's first feature film, You Got Served, was released in 2004, shortly before they announced their break-up.

Distributed through his own production company, RazBeatz Entertainment, Raz released his first single, Fire, in May 2007. Fire officially debuted on the Billboard charts (the week of 5/12/07). Landing a spot on the Hot R&B/Hip-Hop Singles Sales chart and debuting at No. 2, it also hit the Billboard Hot Singles Sales chart at No. 2. There was no promotion behind the single as it debuted, because Raz B was pushing his music on an independent level.

On March 19, 2010, Raz B released his first mixtape titled Boy 2 King. In 2011, Elayne Rivers, Raz B's longtime publicist, announced that he would be going on tour in China. Throughout the tour, Raz B performed shows in various parts of China.

On August 19, 2013, during a performance in Zhejiang province, Raz B tried to stop a fight in the audience and was hit in the face with a glass bottle. Initial reports were that he had fallen into a coma, but subsequent reports were that this was misinformation, labelled as a hoax, and that he would make a full recovery.

== Discography ==
| Year | Album | US | US R&B | UK |
|---|---|---|---|---|
| 2002 | B2K (Gold) | 2 | 1 | - |
| 2002 | B2K: The Remixes – Volume 1 (EP) | 129 | 47 | - |
| 2002 | Pandemonium! (Platinum) | 10 | 3 | 35 |
| 2002 | Santa Hooked Me Up (EP) | 132 | 35 | - |
| 2003 | The Remixes – Volume 2 (EP) | 192 | 38 | - |
| 2004 | B2K Greatest Hits | - | 76 | - |

=== Singles with B2K ===
| Year | Single | Chart positions | | | | Album |
| Year | Single | US Hot 100 | US R&B | US Rhythmic Top 40 | UK singles | Album |
|---|---|---|---|---|---|---|
| 2002 | Uh Huh | 37 | 20 | 14 | 35 | B2K |
| 2002 | Gots Ta Be | 34 | 13 | 14 | - | B2K |
| 2002 | Why I Love You | 73 | 19 | - | - | B2K and Pandemonium! |
| 2002 | Bump, Bump, Bump (with P. Diddy) | 1 | 2 | 1 | 24 | Pandemonium! |
| 2003 | Girlfriend | 30 | 19 | 15 | 10 | Pandemonium! |
| 2003 | Feelin' Freaky (Nick Cannon featuring B2K) | 92 | 46 | - | - | Nick Cannon |
| 2003 | What A Girl Wants | - | 47 | - | - | Pandemonium! |
| 2003 | Uh Huh 2003 | - | - | - | 31 | The Remixes - Volume 2 |
| 2004 | Badaboom (feat. Fabolous) | 59 | 29 | 22 | 26 | You Got Served Soundtrack |
| 2008 | Body Up (without Omarion) | | | | | |

*In the beginning of 2008, a song titled Body Up was leaked; Raz-B leads this song with B2K members J-Boog & Lil' Fizz. Omarion did not take part in the group's return.

=== Discography as solo artist ===
Raz B
- Released: FIRE in May 2007 (Single sold in F.Y.E. stores) (digital download) and was the No. 120 Independent selling single on Billboards.
- Singles:
  - Fire
  - Go Girl
  - "Follow My Lead" prod. by Excel Beats
  - "Official"
  - "Na Na Na"
  - “Guidance” (Released in 2023)

*Boy 2 King: The Mixtape EP. Released: March 19, 2010 (digital download)

- Paradox-EP. Released March 20, 2012.

== Filmography ==
Film
| Year | Film | Role | Notes |
|---|---|---|---|
| 2004 | You Got Served | Vick | Credited as DeMario Thornton |
| 2005 | Pieces of a Dream | | |
| 2009 | Love Sick Diaries | | |
| 2009 | Caged Innocence | | |
| 2014 | Homies兄弟 | Raz B | Starring Parres Craft |
Television
| Year | Title | Role | Notes |
| 2006 | Noah's Arc | Tashi | 1 episode |
| 2023 | Bad Boys | Himself | Main Cast Member (Season 2) |
