= Santa Hooked Me Up =

Studio album by B2K
- Released: October 29, 2002
- Genres: R&B; pop; Christmas
- Label: Epic

B2K chronology
B2K: The Remixes - Volume 1 (2002)	Santa Hooked Me Up (2002)	Pandemonium! (2003)

Professional ratings
Review scores
Source	Rating
Allmusic	3/5 stars
Entertainment Weekly	F
Rolling Stone	(unfavorable)

Santa Hooked Me Up is the second studio album and only Christmas album by R&B group B2K, released on October 29, 2002. It was released just two months before the release of the group's third album, Pandemonium!. A music video as shot for "Why'd You Leave Me on Christmas".

== Track listing ==
No.	Title	Writer(s)	Producer(s)	Length
1.	"Santa Hooked Me Up"	Marques Houston; Jerome Jones; Kelton Kessee; Tony Oliver; Dreux Fréderic; Jarrell Houston; Omari Grandberry	Platinum Status; Chris Stokes	3:29
2.	"Rain and Snow"	Houston; Jones; Kessee; Oliver	Platinum Status; Chris Stokes	3:35
3.	"Jingle Bells"	James Lord Pierpont	Platinum Status; Chris Stokes	3:35
4.	"Sexy Boy Christmas" (featuring TG4)	Houston; Jones; Fréderic; Grandberry; Richard Garcia; Tony Minter; Chris Stokes	Platinum Status; Chris Stokes	3:23
5.	"Everyone's Home for Christmas" (Batman of IMx)	London Thompson; David P. Hilker; Les Scott	London Thompson; Marques Houston (co.); Cameron Graves (co.); Taylor Graves (co.)	4:20
6.	"Santa Claus Is Comin' to Town"	J. Fred Coots; Haven Gillespie	Platinum Status; Chris Stokes	3:07
7.	"Why'd You Leave Me on Christmas"	Houston; Jones; Kessee; Oliver	Platinum Status; Chris Stokes	3:53
8.	"Rudolph the Red-Nosed Reindeer"	John Marks	Platinum Status; Chris Stokes	2:16
9.	"My First Christmas" (featuring IMx)	Houston; Jones; Kessee; Oliver	Platinum Status; Chris Stokes	3:39
10.	"Santa Baby" (featuring Jhené) (bonus track)	Joan Javits; Tony Springer; Phil Springer	Platinum Status	2:46
