= Pandemonium! (album) =

Studio album by B2K
- Released: March 25, 2003
- Genres: R&B; hip hop
- Label: Epic
- Producers: Adonis; Darrell Crooks; Beau Dozier; Charles Farrar; R. Kelly; Lew Laing; Wirlie Morris; Omarion; Platinum Status; Steve Russell; Laney Stewart; Tricky Stewart; Chris Stokes; Troy Taylor; Damon Thomas

B2K chronology
| Santa Hooked Me Up (2002) | Pandemonium! (2003) | The Remixes - Volume 2 (2003) |

Singles from Pandemonium!
- 1. "Bump, Bump, Bump" Released: October 2002; 2. "Girlfriend" Released: March 2003; 3. "What a Girl Wants" Released: May 2003

Pandemonium! is the third studio album from American boy band B2K. It was released in the United States on March 25, 2003, through Epic Records. The group collaborated with a wide range of producers, including Adonis Shropshire, Beau Dozier, Troy Taylor, Charles Farrar, R. Kelly, and brothers Laney Stewart and Tricky Stewart, though frequent collaborators Chris Stokes and Platinum Status handled much of the production. Musically, Pandemonium is primarily an R&B and hip hop album, with influences of pop.

Critics noted that Pandemonium! expands typical male hip-hop themes to include lust, love, apology, and money-focused conflict, though some reviewers felt the label added unnecessary tracks and that it followed a rushed release. Commercially, the album reached number one on the US Top R&B/Hip-Hop Albums chart and number 10 on the Billboard 200 chart, eventually reaching platinum status in the United States. It was powered by the hit single "Bump, Bump, Bump," which reached number one on the Billboard Hot 100. The singles "Girlfriend" and "What a Girl Wants" were included on the special edition of the album, which was released on March 25, 2003.

== Promotion ==
Epic Records released three singles to promote the album. The lead single, "Bump, Bump, Bump," a R. Kelly-produced collaboration with P. Diddy, reached number one on the US Billboard Hot 100 and became the group's only chart-topping hit in the United States. It also achieved significant international success, reaching the top five in Switzerland and Australia and the top ten in Belgium, France, Germany, the Netherlands, and New Zealand, marking B2K's global breakthrough. The follow-up singles, "Girlfriend" and "What a Girl Wants," did not match that level of success, though "Girlfriend," also written and produced by Kelly, still became a top ten hit in the Netherlands and the United Kingdom and reached the top 20 in Switzerland and on the US Hot R&B/Hip-Hop Songs chart. Both songs were later included on the album’s special edition, released on March 25, 2003.

== Critical reception ==
Professional ratings
Review scores
| Source | Rating |
|---|---|
| AllMusic | 3/5 stars |
| Entertainment Weekly | C+ |
| MTV Asia | 4/10 |
| Rolling Stone | 2/5 stars |

AllMusic editor William Ruhlmann noted how the album's production goes over the usual topics of male hip-hop songs, ranging from "lust ("Bump, Bump, Bump"); undying love ("One Kiss"); apology ("Sleepin'"); and, sung with the greatest feeling, accusations that the woman addressed is only interested in money ("Would You Be Here")." Ruhlmann added that there was some label meddling with the addition of "Why I Love You" from the group's self-titled debut and "Dog", a track from one of their artist's upcoming project. Beth Johnson of Entertainment Weekly said of the record, "Just nine months after their R&B-lite debut made the bubblegum set scream, the teenage quartet already have a second disc. This time, between sweet-harmonied ballads, they cue up randy singles ("Bump, Bump, Bump" with P. Diddy), bouncy odes to cruising chicks ("Back It Up"), and "gangsta" boasting. Shouldn't someone be setting a curfew?" Rolling Stone's Christian Hoard described the album as "livelier-than-average R&B". He highlighted the track "Tease" for its merger of funk-influenced hip hop with smooth seductive delivery.

== Commercial performance ==
Pandemonium! debuted at number ten on the Billboard 200 and at number three on Top R&B/Hip-Hop Albums, selling 194,000 the first week. It was eventually certified Platinum by the Recording Industry Association of America (RIAA) on March 18, 2003. By March 2005, it had sold sold 1.2 million units domestically. In the United Kingdom, Pandemonium! reached Silver status on June 5, 2003.

== Track listing ==
Standard edition
| No. | Title | Writer(s) | Producer(s) | Length |
|---|---|---|---|---|
| 1. | "Intro" | De'Mario Thornton; Dreux Frédéric; Jarell Houston; Jerome Jones; Kelton Kessee; Marques Houston; Omarion Grandberry; Tony Oliver | Omarion | 0:31 |
| 2. | "Bump, Bump, Bump" (featuring P. Diddy) | R. Kelly | R. Kelly | 4:42 |
| 3. | "You Can Get It" (featuring Makeba "Girl Wonder" Riddick) | Frédéric; Riddick; Taylor | Taylor | 3:44 |
| 4. | "One Kiss" | Adonis Shropshire; Johnta Austin | Adonis | 3:34 |
| 5. | "My Girl" | Christopher Stewart; Thornton; Frédéric; J. Houston; Grandberry; Patrick "J. Que" Smith; Thabiso Nkhereanye; Traci Hale | Tricky Stewart | 3:31 |
| 6. | "Sleepin'" | Thornton; Frédéric; J. Houston; Grandberry; Smith; Nkhereanye; Wirlie "Wil-E" Morris | T. Stewart; Morris | 3:47 |
| 7. | "Would You Be Here" | Steve "Lil Steve" Russell; Erika Nuri | Russell | 4:29 |
| 8. | "Everything" | Thornton; Frédéric; J. Houston; Jones; Jevon Simms; Laney Stewart; Mark E. Stewart; Grandberry; Robert Hunter; Sam Salter; Terius Nash | Laney | 3:58 |
| 9. | "Tease" (featuring Jhené & Romeo) | T. Stewart; Thornton; Frédéric; J. Houston; Grandberry; Smith; Nkhereanye; Hale | T. Stewart | 3:14 |
| 10. | "Back It Up" | Thornton; Frédéric; J. Houston; Jones; Kessee; M. Houston; Grandberry; Oliver | Chris Stokes; Platinum Status | 3:05 |
| 11. | "Where Did We Go Wrong" | Thornton; Frédéric; J. Houston; Jones; Kessee; M. Houston; Grandberry; Oliver | Stokes; Platinum Status | 4:08 |
| 12. | "Pretty Young Thing" | Thornton; Frédéric; J. Houston; Jones; Kessee; M. Houston; Grandberry; Oliver | Stokes; Platinum Status | 3:16 |
| 13. | "I Beat You To It (Turn The Party Out)" | Thornton; Frédéric; J. Houston; Jones; Kessee; M. Houston; Grandberry; Oliver | Stokes; Platinum Status | 3:52 |
| 14. | "The Other Guy" | Darrell Crooks; Jones; Kessee; Lew Laing; M. Houston; Oliver | Stokes; Crooks; Laing; Platinum Status | 3:17 |
| 15. | "Why I Love You" | Charles Farrar; Dave McPherson; Russell; Taylor | Farrar; Russell; Taylor | 3:58 |
| 16. | "Boys 4 Life" | Thornton; Frédéric; J. Houston; Jones; Grandberry; Richard Garcia; Tony Minter | Dom; Ruk; T-Nyse | 4:37 |
| 17. | "Dog" (performed by Jhené) | | Stokes; Platinum Status | 4:01 |

Special edition
| No. | Title | Writer(s) | Producer(s) | Length |
|---|---|---|---|---|
| 1. | "Intro" | De'Mario Thornton; Dreux Frédéric; Jarell Houston; Jerome Jones; Kelton Kessee; Marques Houston; Omarion Grandberry; Tony Oliver | Omarion | 0:31 |
| 2. | "Bump, Bump, Bump" (featuring P. Diddy) | R. Kelly | R. Kelly | 4:42 |
| 3. | "Girlfriend" | R. Kelly | R. Kelly | 3:24 |
| 4. | "You Can Get It" (featuring Makeba "Girl Wonder" Riddick) | Frederic; Riddick; Taylor | Taylor | 3:44 |
| 5. | "My Girl" | Christopher Stewart; Thornton; Frederic; J. Houston; Grandberry; Patrick "J. Que" Smith; Thabiso Nkhereanye; Traci Hale; Adonis Shropshire; Johnta Austin | Tricky Stewart | 3:31 |
| 6. | "Uh Huh" | C. Stewart; Frederic; J. Houston; Malik Crawford; Nkhereanye; Hale | T. Stewart | 3:43 |
| 7. | "One Kiss" | Adonis Shropshire; Johnta Austin | Adonis | 3:34 |
| 8. | "Gots ta Be" | Damon Thomas; Harvey Mason, Jr.; Mischke Butler; Steve Russell | The Underdogs | 5:22 |
| 9. | "Sleepin'" | Thornton; Frederic; J. Houston; Grandberry; Smith; Nkhereanye; Wirlie "Wil-E" Morris | T. Stewart; Morris | 3:47 |
| 10. | "Everything" | Thornton; Frederic; J. Houston; Jones; Jevon Simms; Laney Stewart; Mark E. Stewart; Grandberry; Robert Hunter; Sam Salter; Terius Nash | Laney | 3:58 |
| 11. | "The Other Guy" | Darrell Crooks; Jones; Kessee; Lew Laing; M. Houston; Oliver | Chris Stokes; Crooks; Laing; Platinum Status | 3:17 |
| 12. | "Why I Love You" | Charles Farrar; Dave McPherson; Russell; Taylor | Farrar; Russell; Taylor | 3:58 |
| 13. | "Boys 4 Life" | Thornton; Frederic; J. Houston; Jones; Grandberry; Richard Garcia; Tony Minter | Dom; Ruk; T-Nyse | 4:37 |
| 14. | "Tease" (featuring Jhené & Romeo) | T. Stewart; Thornton; Frederic; J. Houston; Grandberry; Smith; Nkhereanye; Hale | T. Stewart | 3:14 |
| 15. | "Back It Up" | Thornton; Frederic; J. Houston; Jones; Kessee; M. Houston; Grandberry; Oliver | Stokes; Platinum Status | 3:05 |
| 16. | "Baby Girl" | McPherson; Samuel Archer | The Characters | 4:50 |
| 17. | "Bump, Bump, Bump" (Jiggy Joint Club Remix) | R. Kelly | R. Kelly; Jiggy Joint^{[a]} | 4:51 |
| 18. | "Girlfriend" (Pied Piper Remix) | R. Kelly | R. Kelly; Pied Piper^{[a]} | 3:24 |
| 19. | "Uh Huh" | C. Stewart; Frederic; J. Houston; Malik Crawford; Nkhereanye; Hale | T. Stewart; Ron G.^{[a]} | 3:43 |
| 20. | "What a Girl Wants" | R. Kelly | R. Kelly | 4:38 |
| 21. | "Stuck like This" (performed by Jhené) | | | 3:49 |

Notes

- ^{^[a]} signifies additional producer

== Personnel ==
Credits adapted from the liner notes of Pandemonium!

- Mastering: Gene Grimaldi (Oasis Mastering, Studio City, CA)
- Art Direction and Design: Rance Brown, Natasha Jen
- Photography: Keith Major

== Charts ==
=== Weekly charts ===
Weekly chart performance for Pandemonium!
| Chart (2002–03) | Peak position |
|---|---|
| Australian Albums (ARIA) | 50 |
| Canadian Albums (Nielsen SoundScan) | 95 |
| Canadian R&B Albums (Nielsen SoundScan) | 22 |
| Dutch Albums (Album Top 100) | 64 |
| European Top 100 Albums (Music & Media) | 65 |
| French Albums (SNEP) | 57 |
| German Albums (Offizielle Top 100) | 43 |
| Scottish Albums (Official Charts) | 93 |
| Swiss Albums (Schweizer Hitparade) | 60 |
| UK Albums (Official Charts) | 35 |
| UK R&B Albums (Official Charts) | 5 |
| US Billboard 200 | 10 |
| US Top R&B/Hip-Hop Albums (Billboard) | 1 |

=== Year-end charts ===
Year-end chart performance for Pandemonium!
| Chart (2003) | Position |
|---|---|
| US Billboard 200 | 59 |
| US Top R&B/Hip-Hop Albums (Billboard) | 19 |

== Certifications ==
Certifications and sales for Pandemonium!
| Region | Certification | Certified units/sales |
|---|---|---|
| United Kingdom (BPI) | Silver | 60,000^{^} |
| United States (RIAA) | Platinum | 1,000,000^{^} |
^{^} Shipments figures based on certification alone.
