= List of Love & Hip Hop: Hollywood episodes =

Love & Hip Hop: Hollywood is the third installment of the Love & Hip Hop reality television franchise. It premiered on September 15, 2014 on VH1 and chronicles the lives of several people in the Hollywood area, involved with hip hop music.

== Series overview ==
Season	Episodes	Originally released	
Season	Episodes	First released	Last released
1	14	September 15, 2014	December 9, 2014
2	14	September 7, 2015	December 7, 2015
3	14	August 15, 2016	November 14, 2016
4	16	July 24, 2017	October 23, 2017
5	18	July 23, 2018	November 19, 2018
6	21	August 5, 2019	December 23, 2019

== Episodes ==
=== Season 1 (2014) ===
No. overall	No. in season	Title	Original release date	US viewers (millions)
1	1	"La La Land"	September 15, 2014	2.80
2	2	"Ex'd Out"	September 22, 2014	2.37
3	3	"Moving On"	September 29, 2014	2.28
4	4	"Claim Game"	October 6, 2014	2.18
5	5	"Truth Be Told"	October 13, 2014	2.39
6	6	"Exit Stage Left"	October 20, 2014	2.25
7	7	"Busted"	October 27, 2014	2.33
8	8	"Dissed and Dismissed"	November 3, 2014	2.44
9	9	"Face the Music"	November 10, 2014	2.30
10	10	"Gossip Girl"	November 17, 2014	2.74
11	11	"Treading Water"	November 24, 2014	2.59
12	12	"Matters of the Heart"	December 1, 2014	2.55
13	13	"Reunion – Part 1"	December 8, 2014	2.63
14	14	"Reunion – Part 2"	December 9, 2014	2.07

=== Season 2 (2015) ===
No. overall	No. in season	Title	Original release date	US viewers (millions)
15	1	"The Real"	September 7, 2015	2.39
16	2	"Friend or Foe"	September 14, 2015	2.19
17	3	"Ring of Fire"	September 21, 2015	2.56
18	4	"LA Confidential"	September 28, 2015	2.49
19	5	"Mum's The Word"	October 5, 2015	2.58
20	6	"The Revelation"	October 12, 2015	2.46
21	7	"Truth"	October 19, 2015	2.55
22	8	"About a Boy"	October 26, 2015	2.66
23	9	"A Done Deal"	November 2, 2015	2.43
24	10	"For the Family"	November 9, 2015	2.38
25	11	"Fashion Forward"	November 16, 2015	2.57
26	12	"With This Ring"	November 23, 2015	2.41
27	13	"Reunion – Part 1"	November 30, 2015	2.53
28	14	"Reunion – Part 2"	December 7, 2015	2.51

=== Season 3 (2016) ===
No. overall	No. in season	Title	Original release date	US viewers (millions)
29	1	"California Dreaming"	August 15, 2016	2.45
30	2	"Homewreckers"	August 22, 2016	2.22
31	3	"For the Love of Money"	August 29, 2016	2.25
32	4	"Mama Beef"	September 5, 2016	2.21
33	5	"Now or Never"	September 12, 2016	2.05
34	6	"I Want It All"	September 19, 2016	2.14
35	7	"Party Pooper"	September 26, 2016	2.10
36	8	"Forgive or Forget"	October 3, 2016	2.13
37	9	"Retribution"	October 10, 2016	2.36
38	10	"The Leak"	October 17, 2016	2.28
39	11	"The Source"	October 24, 2016	2.21
40	12	"Matrimony"	October 31, 2016	1.87
41	13	"Reunion – Part 1"	November 7, 2016	2.34
42	14	"Reunion – Part 2"	November 14, 2016	2.26

=== Season 4 (2017) ===
No. overall	No. in season	Title	Original release date	US viewers (millions)
43	1	"Girl Fight"	July 24, 2017	2.29
44	2	"Make It Count"	July 31, 2017	2.08
45	3	"New Bae"	August 7, 2017	2.28
46	4	"Got Swag?"	August 14, 2017	2.18
47	5	"Spirit Animal"	August 21, 2017	2.04
48	6	"Gusbands & Wives"	August 27, 2017	1.01
49	7	"Shady Ladies"	August 28, 2017	2.14
50	8	"Squad Goals"	September 4, 2017	1.73
51	9	"Intervention"	September 11, 2017	2.09
52	10	"Musical Chairs"	September 18, 2017	1.94
53	11	"Friends with Benefits"	September 25, 2017	2.00
54	12	"Boy Band"	October 2, 2017	1.97
55	13	"Exit Stage Left"	October 9, 2017	2.08
56	14	"No Place Like Home"	October 16, 2017	2.12
57	15	"Reunion – Part 1"	October 16, 2017	2.24
58	16	"Reunion – Part 2"	October 23, 2017	2.13

=== Season 5 (2018) ===
No. overall	No. in season	Title	Original release date	U.S. viewers (millions)
59	1	"Clutch Your Pearls"	July 23, 2018	2.12
60	2	"The Bro Code"	July 30, 2018	1.99
61	3	"Separation Anxiety"	August 6, 2018	1.94
62	4	"The D Word" (Note: Episode has also been titled as "Three Years" on VH1's website and in some online episode listings. It is still listed as "The D Word" on digital platforms.)	August 13, 2018	1.95
63	5	"School of Rocc"	August 20, 2018	1.95
64	6	"Pretty Hurts"	August 27, 2018	1.87
65	7	"Shaking the Table"	September 3, 2018	1.96
66	8	"Sex, Lies and Videotape"	September 10, 2018	2.02
67	9	"True Hollywood Story"	September 17, 2018	1.95
68	10	"Mind the Gap"	September 24, 2018	1.74
69	11	"Bad Grandmas"	October 1, 2018	1.74
70	12	"Last Tango With Paris"	October 8, 2018	1.66
71	13	"Keep That Same Energy"	October 15, 2018	1.71
72	14	"Oops She Did It Again"	October 22, 2018	1.74
73	15	"When Wigs Fly"	October 29, 2018	1.86
74	16	"Wedding Crashers"	November 5, 2018	2.08
75	17	"Reunion – Part 1"	November 12, 2018	2.00
76	18	"Reunion – Part 2"	November 19, 2018	1.93

=== Season 6 (2019) ===
No. overall	No. in season	Title	Original release date	U.S. viewers (millions)
77	1	"Hot Girl Summer"	August 5, 2019	1.74
78	2	"Bad Bunny"	August 12, 2019	1.53
79	3	"The Marathon Continues"	August 19, 2019	1.60
80	4	"Wreckless"	August 26, 2019	1.17
81	5	"Dogged Out"	September 2, 2019	1.29
82	6	"Thick as Thieves"	September 9, 2019	1.14
83	7	"Fed Up"	September 16, 2019	1.34
84	8	"Oh Mama"	September 23, 2019	1.33
85	9	"Pretty Petty"	September 30, 2019	1.33
86	10	"Struggle Bus"	October 7, 2019	1.26
87	11	"What Happens in Vegas"	October 14, 2019	1.29
88	12	"Picture Perfect"	October 21, 2019	1.16
89	13	"Paparazzi"	October 28, 2019	1.16
90	14	"Sound Off"	November 4, 2019	1.12
91	15	"With Friends Like These"	November 11, 2019	1.26
92	16	"Showstopper"	November 18, 2019	1.28
93	17	"Dirty 30"	November 25, 2019	1.29
94	18	"Unbothered"	December 2, 2019	1.19
95	19	"Reunion – Part 1"	December 9, 2019	1.38
96	20	"Reunion – Part 2"	December 16, 2019	1.38
97	21	"Reunion – Part 3"	December 23, 2019	1.32

== Specials ==
Year	Special	Season	Premiere	Viewers (millions)
2015	Love & Hip Hop: Out in Hip Hop	2	October 19, 2015	1.50
2017	Love & Hip Hop Hollywood: Dirty Little Secrets	4	July 3, 2017	1.51
2018	Love & Hip Hop Hollywood: Ray J & Princess' Labor of Love	5	September 24, 2018	1.31

== Ratings ==
Love & Hip Hop: Hollywood : U.S. viewers per episode (millions)

Season	Episode number																				
Season	1	2	3	4	5	6	7	8	9	10	11	12	13	14	15	16	17	18	19	20	21
Season 1 (2014)	2.80	2.37	2.28	2.18	2.39	2.25	2.33	2.44	2.30	2.74	2.59	2.55	2.63	2.07	–						
Season 2 (2015)	2.39	2.19	2.56	2.49	2.58	2.46	2.55	2.66	2.43	2.38	2.57	2.41	2.53	2.51	–						
Season 3 (2016)	2.45	2.22	2.25	2.21	2.05	2.14	2.10	2.13	2.36	2.28	2.21	1.87	2.34	2.26	–						
Season 4 (2017)	2.29	2.08	2.28	2.18	2.04	1.01	2.14	1.73	2.09	1.94	2.00	1.97	2.08	2.12	2.24	2.13	–				
Season 5 (2018)	2.12	1.99	1.94	1.95	1.95	1.87	1.96	2.02	1.95	1.74	1.74	1.66	1.71	1.74	1.86	2.08	2.00	1.93	–		
Season 6 (2019)	1.74	1.53	1.60	1.17	1.29	1.14	1.34	1.33	1.33	1.26	1.29	1.16	1.16	1.12	1.26	1.28	1.29	1.19	1.38	1.38	1.32

Audience measurement performed by Nielsen Media Research
