= Girlfriend (B2K song) =

2003 single by B2K

Single by B2K

from the album Pandemonium!
- B-side: "Bump That"
- Released: February 17, 2003
- Genre: R&B
- Length: 3:24
- Label: Epic, T.U.G.
- Songwriter: R. Kelly
- Producer: R. Kelly

B2K singles chronology
"Bump, Bump, Bump" (2002)	"Girlfriend" (2003)	"What a Girl Wants" (2003)

"Girlfriend" is the second single by American boy band B2K from their second studio album, Pandemonium! (2002). It was written and produced by R. Kelly. The song was included on the special edition of the album, which was released in March 2003. The single peaked at number 30 on the US Billboard Hot 100 (giving B2K their final top-40 hit) and number 19 on the Hot R&B/Hip-Hop Singles & Tracks chart.

== Music video ==
In the music video for "Girlfriend", B2K walk out of a mall and Omarion meets a girl (Jennifer Freeman). He gets her phone number and then the girl's father, Mr. Biggs (Ronald Isley), comes along and tells him to stay away from his daughter, which is also repeated by his bodyguard (Big Boy). The girl in the car tells Omarion to give her a call and then the car drives away. Then the guys start to dance once the music begins and they are all dressed in white. The video then goes to a scene where Omarion and the girl are planning a date over the phone. However, both of them are unaware that Mr. Biggs is listening to the conversation on another line and he orders his security guards to kidnap Omarion. J-Boog, Raz-B and Lil' Fizz call up a woman (Vivica A. Fox) and tell her what happened. A man (Flex Alexander) pulls up in a parking lot where the guys are waiting and takes them to see the Godfather (Will Smith), who orders them to save Omarion. The guys break into Mr. Biggs' house, fight the guards and rescue Omarion. Mr. Biggs walks in to see that Omarion is gone and his guards have been beaten. Then the Godfather calls him and asks him to "let it go" and Mr. Biggs accepts and lets Omarion date his daughter. The video ends with Omarion asking the girl to be his girlfriend and she accepts.

== Track listings ==
US CD single

1. "Girlfriend" (main version) – 3:26
2. "Girlfriend" (Ron G remix main version) – 3:18

US 12-inch single

A1. "Girlfriend" (main version) – 3:26
B1. "Girlfriend" (instrumental) – 3:24
B2. "Girlfriend" (a cappella) – 3:26

US 12-inch remix single

1. "Girlfriend" (Ron G remix main version) – 3:18
2. "Girlfriend" (Ron G remix instrumental) – 3:18
3. "Girlfriend" (Ron G remix a cappella) – 3:18

Australian CD single

1. "Girlfriend" (main version) – 3:27
2. "Girlfriend" (Ron G remix) – 3:18
3. "Girlfriend" (Pied Piper remix featuring R. Kelly) – 2:58
4. "Bump, Bump, Bump" (remix radio edit featuring P. Diddy and Nazkar) – 3:54

UK CD1

1. "Girlfriend" (Ron G remix) – 3:27
2. "Girlfriend" (Pied Piper remix featuring R. Kelly) – 2:56
3. "Girlfriend" (main version) – 3:26
4. "Girlfriend" (Pied Piper remix instrumental) – 2:54
5. "Girlfriend" (video)

UK CD2

1. "Girlfriend" (Ron G remix) – 3:27
2. "Bump, Bump, Bump" (remix main version featuring P. Diddy and Nazkar) – 4:54
3. "Bump That" (main version) – 3:16

UK cassette single

1. "Girlfriend" (Ron G remix) – 3:27
2. "Girlfriend" (Pied Piper remix featuring R. Kelly) – 2:56

European CD single

1. "Girlfriend" (main version) – 3:26
2. "Girlfriend" (Pied Piper remix featuring R. Kelly) – 2:56

== Charts ==
=== Weekly charts ===
Chart (2003)	Peak position
Australia (ARIA)	39
Australian Urban (ARIA)	15
Belgium (Ultratip Bubbling Under Flanders)	5
Belgium (Ultratip Bubbling Under Wallonia)	12
Europe (European Hot 100 Singles)	34
Germany (GfK)	41
Ireland (IRMA)	27
Netherlands (Dutch Top 40 Tipparade)	7
Netherlands (Single Top 100)	48
Scotland Singles (OCC)	25
Switzerland (Schweizer Hitparade)	19
UK Singles (OCC)	10
UK Airplay (Music Week)	20
UK Hip Hop/R&B (OCC)	3
US Billboard Hot 100	30
US Hot R&B/Hip-Hop Songs (Billboard)	19
US Rhythmic Airplay (Billboard)	15

=== Year-end charts ===
Chart (2003)	Position
UK Urban (Music Week)	17
US Hot R&B/Hip-Hop Singles & Tracks (Billboard)	83
US Rhythmic Top 40 (Billboard)	77

== Release history ==
Region	Date	Format(s)	Label(s)	Ref.
United States	February 17, 2003	Rhythmic contemporary; urban radio	Epic; T.U.G.	
United States	March 31, 2003	Contemporary hit radio	Epic; T.U.G.	
United Kingdom	June 9, 2003	CD; cassette	Epic; T.U.G.	
Australia	July 7, 2003	CD	Epic; T.U.G.	
