= Pollina (surname) =

Pollina is a surname. Notable people with the surname include:

- Adam Pollina, American comic-book artist
- Anthony Pollina (born 1952), American politician from Vermont
- Billy Pollina (born 1961), American television and film producer

== See also ==
- Pollina
