= Jennifer Friedman =

Jennifer Friedman may refer to:

- Jennifer Friedman (ice hockey), for Providence Friars women's ice hockey
- Jennifer Friedman, character in Eight Crazy Nights

== See also ==
- Jennifer Freeman, American actress
