= Jennifer Freeman =

American actress

- Occupation: Actress
- Years active: 2000–present
- Spouse: Earl Watson (m. 2009; div. 2015)
- Children: 1

Jennifer Freeman is an American actress. She is best known for playing the role of Claire Kyle in the sitcom My Wife and Kids (introduced in season 2), and her film roles in You Got Served (2004) and Johnson Family Vacation (2004).

== Career ==
Freeman is best known for playing the role of Claire Kyle (replacing Jazz Raycole) in the ABC sitcom My Wife and Kids. She has also made guest appearances on TV such as 7th Heaven, Switched!, One on One, and The OC. Her music video appearance is B2K's "Girlfriend". She is a spokesmodel for the Neutrogena skincare.

Freeman's TV credits include My Wife and Kids, 7th Heaven, Even Stevens, and Lizzie McGuire. Her film credits include feature roles in Johnson Family Vacation, You Got Served and Mercy Street. She also appeared in films such as The '70s and The Visit. Her stage credits include the L.A.-area productions of The Wiz, in which she played Dorothy, and Billa in The Gift.

Freeman began a nationwide print and television campaign as one of "the young fresh faces" of Neutrogena. In 2003, TV Guide named her as one of the Top 10 Hot Teens to watch.

From 2013 to 2016 she was on the main cast of reality television series Real Husbands of Hollywood. In 2017 Freeman starred on True to the Game, directed by Preston A. Whitmore II. In 2018, Freeman released a self-help book, Journey to Loving Yourself.

Since 2020 Freeman has been cast in several original TV Movies and series for BET and BET+. Between 2022 and 2023 Freeman starred as Kimberly on NAACP Image Awards' nominated drama series The Black Hamptons. Freeman also acted on leading role on Christmas comedy film A Royal Surprise, and its sequel A Royal Christmas Surprise, and Blended Christmas in 2025.

== Personal life ==
Freeman married basketball player Earl Watson in early 2009. They have a daughter together. In August 2010 they separated, and briefly reconciled in 2011, until they divorced in March 2015.

== Filmography ==
=== Film ===
Year	Title	Role	Notes
2000	The '70s	Ceta Kid #2	
2000	The Visit	Young Felicia	
2004	You Got Served	Liyah	
2004	Johnson Family Vacation	Jill	
2008	The Caretaker	Sonya	
2008	Jada	Jasmine	
2012	Falling Away	Emily	
2017	Before We Crash	Ava	Short
2017	True to the Game	Lita	
2018	Throwback Holiday	Jacqueline	
2019	Wrongfully Accused	Rashida	TV movie
2019	A Second Chance	Leslie Moore	
2020	The Business of Christmas	Dani Franklin-Hughes	
2020	Kiss Me for Christmas	Nina	
2020	Beaus of Holly	Holly	TV movie
2021	Twisted House Sitter	Morgan	
2021	The Business of Christmas 2	Dani Franklin-Hughes	
2022	Staycation	Dawn Robinson	
2022	A Royal Surprise	Riley Stevenson	TV movie
2022	Infamously in Love	Ivy Rose	TV movie
2022	My Christmas Fiancé	Maya Coleman	
2022	Aisle Be Home for Christmas	Michelle	TV movie
2023	Paradies 2	Jackie	
2023	A Royal Christmas Surprise	Riley Stevenson	TV movie
2024	Blended Christmas	April	TV movie
2025	Angie's Cure	Maya	TV movie

=== Television ===
Year	Title	Role	Notes
2000	7th Heaven	Joan	Episode: "Help!"
2000	Even Stevens	Chloe	Episode: "After Hours"
2001	Lizzie McGuire	Alix	Episode: "Pool Party"
2001–2005	My Wife and Kids	Claire Kyle	Main cast: Season 2–5
2002	Intimate Portrait	Herself	Episode: "Tisha Campbell-Martin"
2002	All That	T.R. Yell Fan	Episode: "P. Diddy"
2003	Switched!	Herself	Episode: "Jennifer and Aubrey"
2005	The O.C.	Student	Episode: "The Shape of Things to Come"
2006	One on One	Alicia	Episode: "Recipe for Disaster"
2007	The 1/2 Hour News Hour	Herself	Episode: "Episode #1.15"
2013–2016	Real Husbands of Hollywood	Herself	Recurring cast
2017	Tales	Ashley	Episode: "A Story to Tell"
2019	Soulful Sundaze	Herself	Episode: "Identity"
2020	Pump	Brianna	Main cast
2021	Celebrity Family Feud	Herself/Celebrity Contestant	Episode: "Episode #8.7"
2021	Celebrity Scene Spotlight	Shelly	Episode: "The Investment"
2022–2023	The Black Hamptons	Kimberly	Main cast
2023	Be Someone	Cassandra	Main cast

=== Music Videos ===
Year	Song	Artist	Role
2003	"Girlfriend"	B2K	Omarion's girlfriend
2003	"What a Girl Wants"	B2K	Omarion's girlfriend
2019	"Obsession"	TJ Jackson	Love interest
2026	"A Good Day"	Anderson .Paak, Cordae	Miss Linda
