= J-Boog =

American singer

- Also known as: Boog, Boogie
- Born: Jarell Damonté Houston; August 11, 1985 (age 41); Compton, California, U.S.
- Genres: R&B; pop
- Occupations: Rapper; singer-songwriter; actor; dancer; choreographer
- Years active: 1998–present
- Labels: TUG; Epic; Sony Urban; Sony BMG; PopularEnt; Blvd Music

Jarell Damonté Houston Sr. (born August 11, 1985), known professionally as J-Boog, is an American singer and rapper, best known as a member of R&B group B2K. The group achieved success in the early 2000s with the singles "Bump, Bump, Bump", "Uh Huh", and "Girlfriend", each of which achieved success on the Billboard Hot 100.

== Career ==
=== B2K ===
As a teenager, J-Boog became a member of the boy group B2K, alongside Lil' Fizz, Raz-B, and Omarion.

In 2004, he starred as Rico, the peacemaker of the group, in the hit dance movie, You Got Served, with his B2K bandmates and Marques Houston.

=== Post-B2K ===
After the break-up of B2K, J-Boog collaborated with Lil Fizz on an EP album titled "Night Life" in 2006. He then partnered with long-time music manager Chris Stokes and Marques Houston, becoming vice president and Producer at their film production company, Footage Films, where he also acted in a few films. Additionally, J-Boog has appeared in Step Up 2: The Streets, and was an ensemble cast member of an Off-Off Broadway stage production.

In early 2018, J-Boog briefly appeared on an episode of Love & Hip Hop: Hollywood, where he and Lil Fizz discussed plans to reunite the band without Omarion, which failed to happen due to discrepancies with cast member and associate Ray J, who proved himself to be a bold replacement after being considered to join the band.

In December 2018, it was announced by long time friend and business manager Damuer H. Leffridge that B2K would hold a reunion tour titled "The Millennium Tour" in 2019. The tour also featured Pretty Ricky, Lloyd, Mario, Bobby V, Chingy and the Ying Yang Twins. His experience with the tour was later documented in a 2019 season of Love & Hip Hop: Hollywood, where he appeared as a supporting cast member and deeply expressed his concerns about the group's fate, due to personal discrepancies between some of the members interfering with the band's reputation, along with partnering with Marques Houston and his band Immature to develop a reunion tour for that band.

== Personal life ==
J-Boog has five children, three daughters and two sons.

== Discography ==
- Night Life – EP (2009) (Fizz & Boog)

== Filmography ==
=== Movies ===
- 2004: You Got Served – Rico (Supporting role)
- 2009: Steppin: The Movie – Greg
- 2014: Hype Nation-3D – Jessy
- 2016: A Weekend with the Family – Joey
- 2019: Always and Forever
- 2019: Fall Girls- Jerome
- 2023: Rock the Boat- Detective Jacobs
- 2024: Rock the Boat 2- Detective Jacobs
- 2025: Adopted II- Detective Spade

=== Television ===
- 2002: All That – musical guest with B2K
- 2005: 106 & Park – Co-Host
- 2016: The BET Life of B2K – Himself
- 2017: Love & Hip Hop: Hollywood – Himself
- 2019: Love & Hip Hop: Hollywood – Himself
- 2020: Howard High – Mr. Johnson

=== Stage Plays ===
- 2016: Man of the House – Lawrence
