= Beat the World =

- International theatrical release poster
- Directed by: Robert Adetuyi
- Written by: Robert Adetuyi
- Produced by: Amos Adetuyi
- Starring: Tyrone Brown; Mishael Morgan; Nikki Grant; Ali Kazmi; Kristy Flores
- Cinematography: Hubert Taczanowski
- Edited by: Ronald Sanders; Mike Lee
- Music by: Andrew Lockington
- Production companies: Stage 6 Films; Melee Entertainment; Blue Circle Entertainment
- Distributed by: Sony Pictures Home Entertainment; InnerCity Films
- Release date: May 13, 2011
- Running time: 91 minutes
- Country: Canada
- Language: English
- Box office: $933,540

Beat the World (also known as You Got Served: Beat the World) is a 2011 Canadian dance film written and directed by Robert Adetuyi. It is a loose sequel to the American film You Got Served (2004). It was produced by InnerCity Films and Telefilm Canada - Equity Investment Program. The film stars Tyrone Brown, Mishael Morgan, Nikki Grant, Kristy Flores Christian Mio Loclair and Parkour artist Chase Armitage. The plot involves three dance crews from around the world preparing to do battle at the international Beat the World competition in Detroit, Michigan.

In the United States, the film was released straight-to-video on June 21, 2011 by Sony Home Entertainment, but it did receive a theatrical release in international territories, grossing a total of $933,540.

== Premise ==
Three dance crews prepare to do battle at the international Beat the World competition in Detroit. During the final showdown to become world champions, lifelong hopes, dreams and even lives, are at stake.

== Cast ==
- Tyrone Brown as Yuson
- Nikki Grant as Cherry
- Kristy Flores as Olivia
- Lil' C as Deray
- Mishael Morgan as Maya
- Ali Kazmi as Dancer
- Shane Pollard as Carlos
- Christian Mio Locla as Eric
- Gracine Milano as Lisa

== Soundtrack ==
The original soundtrack was produced by Frank Fitzpatrick and released on Hip Hop Connect, an independent label and production company specializing in socially conscious rap, hip hop and film soundtracks.

- KRS-One
- K'Naan
- Ziggy Marley
- Nneka
- Les Nubians
- MV Bill
- Talib Kweli
- Sway
- Lina

A portion of the proceeds were donated to the Debbie Allen Dance Academy through EarthTones.

== Release ==
In the United States, the film was released directly to DVD and Blu-ray on June 21, 2011. The theatrical release for the film occurred overseas.

== Reception ==
On Rotten Tomatoes the film has a 0% rating based on reviews from 5 critics, with an average critic score of 3.4/10.

Paula Citron of The Globe and Mail found the film to be predictable and the dance sequences to be over-edited, commenting: "... if the audience is not there for the story - which is clearly just a hat to hang the dance on - they must be there for the dance. Unfortunately, because Adetuyi's film is actually one very long music video, the dance portions are shot in 30-second bites, so one never gets a sense of an entire routine. All we get is fast-cut teasers."

In his review for NOW Toronto, Norman Wilner criticised the acting skills of the accomplished dancers and found the plot to be hackneyed, concluding:" ... It's all just atrociously acted filler between the dance sequences, which Adetuyi shoots so haphazardly that it's impossible to appreciate the artists or choreography."

Bruce DeMara, reviewing for the Toronto Star found the plot, dialogue and theme of beating the world to be clichéd. He praised the dance performances but criticised their editing. He concluded: " ... there are a couple of decent performances that shine through, notably Brown as Yuson and Ray Johnson as his friend, Easy, both of whom have solid onscreen presence but need a better film to demonstrate it in. Adetuyi has the makings of a decent filmmaker. He just needs to stick to the basics: believable dialogue and characters and a storyline that takes a few chances."
