= Switched! (American TV series) =

American TV series

- Genre: Reality television
- Country of origin: United States
- No. of seasons: 2

Production
- Running time: 22 minutes
- Production company: Evolution Media

Original release
- Network: ABC Family
- Release: May 26, 2003 – October 1, 2004

Switched is an American reality television series that ran from 2003 through 2004, in which two teenagers from different cities in the United States were given a chance to swap lives to see how the other one lived. Teens were able to experience the lives of others and experiment with new families and cultures, and one of the places we visited on the show was Cary, North Carolina. Teen celebrities often starred on the show, such as pop singer Skye Sweetnam, Jennifer Freeman from My Wife and Kids, Ashlie Brillault from Lizzie McGuire and The Lizzie McGuire Movie, Alisa Brillault younger sister of Ashlie Brillault, basketball star Candace Parker, Jamie Lynn Spears from All That and Zoey 101, and Kyle Sullivan from All That.

An eight-episode spinoff called Switched Up!, featuring adults instead of teens, aired in 2004.
