= What a Girl Wants (B2K song) =

Single by B2K

from the album Pandemonium!
- Released: May 2003
- Genre: Neo soul
- Length: 4:38
- Label: Epic
- Songwriter: R. Kelly
- Producer: R. Kelly

B2K singles chronology
| "Girlfriend" (2003) | "What a Girl Wants" (2003) | "Uh Huh (Remix)" (2003) |

"What a Girl Wants" is the fourth single by Boy band B2K from their studio album Pandemonium!. It was written and produced by R. Kelly. The song was included on the special edition of the album, which was released in March 2003. The single was released in May 2003 and peaked at number 47 on Billboard's Hot R&B/Hip-Hop Songs chart.

== Music video ==
In the music video, Omarion is driving a car while singing the song and telling his friend (J-Boog) that he needs to treat the girl that he's with the right way. They guys are also dressed in all white while singing the song on the video. The video has cameos of Jennifer Freeman as Omarion's girlfriend and Kyla Pratt as J-Boog's girlfriend.

== Weekly charts ==
| Chart (2003) | Peak position |
|---|---|
| US Hot R&B/Hip-Hop Songs (Billboard) | 47 |
