= Love & Hip Hop: Hollywood season 5 =

Love & Hip Hop: Hollywood
- Season 5
- Cover used by the iTunes Store
- Starring: K. Michelle; Teairra Marí; Moniece Slaughter; Nikki Mudarris; Brooke Valentine; Lyrica Anderson; A1 Bentley; Princess Love; Ray J
- No. of episodes: 18

Release
- Original network: VH1
- Original release: July 23 – November 19, 2018

Season chronology
- ← Previous; Season 4 Next → Season 6

The fifth season of the reality television series Love & Hip Hop: Hollywood aired on VH1 from July 23, 2018 until November 19, 2018. It was primarily filmed in Los Angeles, California. It is executively produced by Mona Scott-Young, Stephanie Gayle and Treiva Williams for Monami Entertainment, Toby Barraud, Stefan Springman, Dave Patry, David DiGangi, Rich Allen and Michael Lang for Eastern TV, and Nina L. Diaz, Liz Fine, Vivian Gomez and Jihoon Zun for VH1.

The series chronicles the lives of several women and men in the Los Angeles area, involved in hip hop music. It consists of 18 episodes, including a two-part reunion special hosted by Nina Parker.

== Production ==
Season five of Love & Hip Hop: Hollywood began filming in February 2018.

On June 18, 2018, VH1 announced Love & Hip Hop: Hollywood would be returning for a fifth season on July 23, 2018, along with a teaser confirming Love & Hip Hop: Atlanta's K. Michelle had joined the cast. Unlike her appearances on Love & Hip Hop: Atlanta and Love & Hip Hop: New York, K. is credited under her birth name, Kimberly. This season featured an entirely new opening credits sequence. Season five saw the promotion of A1 Bentley and Brooke Valentine to the main cast after previously appearing as supporting cast members. New cast members include video vixen Apple Watts, singer La'Britney, K. Michelle: My Life's Paris Phillips, Grammy Award-nominated producer RoccStar, manager Shun Love, model Amber Diamond, bisexual rapper and drag performer JayWill and media personality Donatella. Although not included in the initial cast announcement, Apple's father John Watts would appear in a minor supporting role.

On July 3, VH1 released an extended teaser with the season's tagline "get the truth behind the headlines". The season's promotional videos would all follow a tabloid-themed aesthetic, with images of cast members paired with lurid headlines and set to Marvin Gaye's "I Heard It Through the Grapevine". On July 6, 2018, VH1 began releasing "meet the cast" interview promos featuring new cast members Apple Watts, La'Britney, Paris Phillips, RoccStar and Shun Love. On July 16, 2018, VH1 released a 5-minute super-trailer.

On August 30, 2018, it was announced that Princess and Ray J would star in their own special, Love & Hip Hop Hollywood: Ray J & Princess’ Labor of Love, which would air on September 24, 2018, and document the birth of their child.

== Synopsis ==
Palm trees, swimming pools, red carpets and fancy cars. Looks nice, don't it? Well, looks can be deceiving. In a city full of fake ballers and some big ole fake booties, the only thing real is the thirst. Millions of people flock to Hollywood chasing a celebrity dream, and they get stuck in the bullshit. See, fame ain't for the faint of heart, and with every come-up comes some jealousy and some betrayal. It's enough to test the strength of any wannabe power couple. Success, marriage, family. These people in Hollywood think they deserve it all, no matter how reckless they act. See, but not everybody's rooting for you or your happy ending. Oh, and the traffic sucks. But that's okay, 'cause I know how to navigate these streets. My name is Kimberly, the artist formerly known as K. Michelle, and after all these years of shaking tables, throwing candles and turning heads down south. I'm bringing the real to La La Land. Hollywood ain't ready for this shit.

— K. Michelle, opening monologue

=== Reception ===
Despite continuing the franchise's overall ratings decline, the season's over-the-top storylines were well received by fans and critics, with Ziwe Fumudoh of Vulture giving the fifth and seventh episodes perfect scores. Writer Michael Arceneaux praised the season for providing a "ratchet good time" and "making Love & Hip Hop great again".

== Cast ==
=== Starring ===
- K. Michelle^{1} (12 episodes)
- Teairra Marí (15 episodes)
- Moniece Slaughter (15 episodes)
- Nikki Mudarris (13 episodes)
- Brooke Valentine (17 episodes)
- Lyrica Anderson (14 episodes)
- A1 Bentley (14 episodes)
- Princess Love (10 episodes)
- Ray J (11 episodes)
Note:
1. Credited onscreen as "Kimberly".

=== Also starring ===
- Bridget Kelly (13 episodes)
- Solo Lucci (9 episodes)
- Apple Watts (14 episodes)
- A.D. Diggs (5 episodes)
- Paris Phillips (16 episodes)
- Marcus Black (15 episodes)
- Donatella (6 episodes)
- Lil' Fizz (4 episodes)
- RoccStar (12 episodes)
- Pam Bentley (8 episodes)
- Lyrica Garrett (10 episodes)
- La'Britney (12 episodes)
- JayWill (8 episodes)
- Amber Diamond (8 episodes)
- Shun Love (11 episodes)
- Misster Ray (6 episodes)
- John Watts (6 episodes)

Safaree Samuels and Daniel "Booby" Gibson return in guest roles, while Stassia Thomas, Loyd Bentley, Akbar Abdul-Ahad, Patrice Bentley, Sade Abdul-Ahad and Alejandra Perez appear as guest stars in several episodes. The show also features minor appearances from notable figures within the hip hop industry and Hollywood's social scene, including Sonja Norwood, Brandy Norwood, Willie Norwood, Tiffany Campbell, Lisa Bloom, Lady Leshurr, Love & Hip Hop: Miami's Amara La Negra and Kash Doll.

== Episodes ==
No. overall	No. in season	Title	Original release date	U.S. viewers (millions)
59	1	"Clutch Your Pearls"	July 23, 2018	2.12
K. Michelle, now going by her birth name Kimberly, arrives in Hollywood and exposes Lyrica's alleged affair with Safaree. Apple Watts tries to escape the hood and kickstart her rap career. guest stars: Sonja Norwood (Ray J's mother), Lee Lee (Apple Watts' friend), Misster Ray Kimberly, Brooke and A1 are added to the opening credits, replacing departing cast members Keyshia Cole, Hazel-E and Safaree. Kimberly, Apple Watts and Paris join the cast. Although credited, Brooke does not appear.
60	2	"The Bro Code"	July 30, 2018	1.99
A1 and Lyrica's marriage is in turmoil as he searches for the truth about her relationship with Safaree. guest stars: Stassia, BenMarc (music video director), Sonja Norwood (Ray J's mother), Brandy (Ray J's sister), Safaree Samuels cameo: Willie Norwood Donatella joins the supporting cast. Although credited, Teairra, Moniece, and Nikki do not appear.
61	3	"Separation Anxiety"	August 6, 2018	1.94
A1 and Lyrica's family gets involved in their marital woes. guest stars: Safaree, Dr. Aboolian (plastic surgeon), Loyd (A1's brother) RoccStar joins the supporting cast. Although credited, Teairra and Nikki do not appear.
62	4	"The D Word" (Note: Episode has also been titled as "Three Years" on VH1's website and in some online episode listings. It is still listed as "The D Word" on digital platforms.)	August 13, 2018	1.95
A1 tells Lyrica he wants a divorce. Teairra has a new man, Akbar, who is already clashing with her friends. Moniece discovers Fizz is dating her old enemy Tiffany. guest stars: Akbar Abdul-Ahad, JayWill, Tiffany, Misster Ray, Stassia La'Britney joins the supporting cast. Although credited, Kimberly does not appear.
63	5	"School of Rocc"	August 20, 2018	1.95
A1 and Roccstar get into a brawl over Lyrica. Paris and Nikki start digging for dirt on Akbar. guest stars: Stassia, Loyd (A1's brother), Patrice (Loyd's wife), Akbar, Sade Abdul-Ahad (Akbar's "wife") JayWill joins the supporting cast. Although credited, Kimberly, Princess and Ray J do not appear.
64	6	"Pretty Hurts"	August 27, 2018	1.87
Lyrica reveals she's pregnant, sending ripples through the family. RoccStar tries to help Amber Diamond's career. guest stars: Dr. David Sayah (plastic surgeon), Akbar, John Watts (Apple Watts' father), Pam, Loyd (A1's brother), Patrice (Loyd's wife) cameo: Alejandra Perez Amber Diamond and Shun Love join the supporting cast. Although credited, Princess and Ray J do not appear.
65	7	"Shaking the Table"	September 3, 2018	1.96
A1 and Safaree confront each other at a dinner party. Teairra and Paris get into a brawl with Akbar and his "wives". guest stars: Loyd (A1's brother), Patrice (Loyd's wife), Safaree, Cheryl (Brooke's mother), Lorrie (Marcus' mother), Akbar, Sade (Akbar's "wife), Alejandra Perez (Akbar's "girlfriend") Although credited, Moniece does not appear.
66	8	"Sex, Lies and Videotape"	September 10, 2018	2.02
Teairra's sex tape leaks, shocking everyone. guest stars: Safaree, Alejandra (Akbar's girlfriend), Akbar, Treiva Williams (executive producer), Lisa Bloom (Teairra Marí's lawyer), Mikey Pesante (choreographer), Jasmine Brand (Journalist/blogger) Although credited, Kimberly and Princess do not appear.
67	9	"True Hollywood Story"	September 17, 2018	1.95
Teairra decides to take Akbar to court, but her friends have suspicions about the situation. guest stars: Marques Anthony, Alejandra (Akbar's "girlfriend"), Anthony Cherry (Kimberly's stylist), Akbar cameo: Lisa Bloom Although credited, Lyrica, A1, Princess and Ray J do not appear.
68	10	"Mind the Gap"	September 24, 2018	1.74
The girls go on a trip to London to help Bridget promote her album. guest stars: Loyd (A1's brother), Nima Haddadi (Shun Love's attorney), Chef Paul (piemaker), Steve "Henry VII" Murphy (Tudor History tours), DJ Ace (radio host), Jason Moe (music blogger), Nathan Devonte (music blogger) Although credited, Kimberly, Princess and Ray J do not appear.
69	11	"Bad Grandmas"	October 1, 2018	1.74
Pam and Lyrica Garrett try to mend their relationship but they are quickly come to each other's throats. The girls continue to clash on their London trip. guest stars: Dr Thema Bryant-Davis (Psychologist), John Watts (Apple Watts' father), Lady Leshurr Although credited, Kimberly appears only in archival footage and Princess does not appear.
70	12	"Last Tango With Paris"	October 8, 2018	1.66
Kimberly and Paris have a heated confrontation with Paris throwing a drink in her face. guest stars: Kritikal (creative director/photographer), Akbar, Amara La Negra John Watts joins the supporting cast. Although credited, Nikki, Lyrica, A1, Princess and Ray J do not appear.
71	13	"Keep That Same Energy"	October 15, 2018	1.71
Brooke gets checked by Teairra for spreading rumors about her. cameo: Loyd, Patrice Although credited, Kimberly and Ray J do not appear.
72	14	"Oops She Did It Again"	October 22, 2018	1.74
Roccstar comes to Teairra's defence and gets involved in the drama with Akbar. guest stars: Alejandra (Akbar's girlfriend), Sade (Akbar's wife), Akbar, Walter Mosley Jr. (Teairra Marí's lawyer) Although credited, Kimberly, Nikki, Lyrica, A1 and Princess do not appear.
73	15	"When Wigs Fly"	October 29, 2018	1.86
When Amber shows an interest in Marcus, Brooke invites her and her mother Shun to an event to humiliate her for it. It ends with Shun snatching her daughter's wig to use as a weapon against Brooke and Bridget. guest stars: Booby, Kash Doll (recording artist), Patrice (Loyd's wife) Although credited, Teairra, Moniece, Nikki, Princess and Ray J do not appear.
74	16	"Wedding Crashers"	November 5, 2018	2.08
Moniece crashes A1 and Lyrica's vow renewal ceremony to fight Princess. Apple learns that she's not actually related to her "father". Booby confronts Marcus over his treatment of Brooke. guest stars: Safaree, Booby
75	17	"Reunion – Part 1"	November 12, 2018	2.00
The cast reunite. A1 and Lyrica make a final decision on their marriage. host: Nina Parker guest stars: Safaree, Akbar, Sade (Akbar's wife), Alejandra (Akbar's girlfriend)
76	18	"Reunion – Part 2"	November 19, 2018	1.93
Teairra confronts Akbar and his "wives" over the sex tape scandal. host: Nina Parker guest stars: Safaree, Akbar, Sade (Akbar's wife), Alejandra (Akbar's girlfriend)

== Webisodes ==
=== Check Yourself ===
Love & Hip Hop Hollywood: Check Yourself, which features the cast's reactions to each episode, was released weekly with every episode on digital platforms.

List of Love & Hip Hop Hollywood: Check Yourself Season 5 episodes

Episode	Title	Featured cast members	Ref
1	"Who Beats Up on a Pregnant Person?"	Solo Lucci, Paris, Donatella, A1, Moniece	
2	"Laughing's Not the Answer"	Paris, Brooke, A1, Marcus	
3	"Mama Drama"	A1, Marcus, Donatella, Solo Lucci, Brooke	
4	"Solo Lucci's Nasty Party & Brooke's Biopsy Results"	Donatella, Paris, A1, Marcus, Solo Lucci, Brooke	
5	"Marcus’s Fuckboy Tendencies & Teairra Mari’s Boyfriend’s Wife"	Marcus, Donatella, Brooke, Solo Lucci	
6	"RoccStar Gets Paid & Paris Gets the Dirt"	Solo Lucci, Brooke, Marcus, RoccStar	
7	"A Shotgun Wedding & Teairra's Love Square"	Brooke, Donatella, Marcus, Solo Lucci	
8	"A1 Jumps Safaree & Misster Ray Wants Kandie"	Brooke, Donatella, Solo Lucci	
9	"Akbar Shoots His Shot & JayWill Gets Shady"	Paris, Moniece, Bridget, Brooke, La'Britney	
10	"Hollywood Takes London"	Bridget, Brooke, Paris, La'Britney, Moniece	
11	"Fools in London & Brawls on the Beach"	Moniece, Paris, La'Britney, Bridget, Brooke	
12	"Kimberly Brings the Literal Receipts"	Solo Lucci, Donatella, Misster Ray, Bridget, Brooke	
13	"A1 Faces Mama Drama & Nikki's Not Having It with Solo Lucci"	Brooke, Donatella, Solo Lucci, Misster Ray, Bridget	
14	"Teairra Mari & Akbar's Messy Drama Continues"	Misster Ray, Bridget, Brooke, Donatella, Solo Lucci	
15	"Brooke Goes Catfishing"	Bridget, Brooke, Donatella, Misster Ray, La'Britney	
16	"The Circus Animal Jig"	Bridget, Brooke, Donatella, Misster Ray, La'Britney	

=== Bonus scenes ===
Deleted scenes from the season's episodes were released weekly as bonus content on VH1's official website.

List of Love & Hip Hop: Hollywood Season 5 bonus scenes

Episode	Title	Featured cast members	Ref
1	"Paris The Plus-One" (Extended scene)	K. Michelle, Moniece, Bridget	
1	"Solo Lucci's Tribute to Nikki"	Solo Lucci, Teairra, Nikki	
2	"Brooke Needs Advice" (Extended scene)	Brooke, Princess, Lyrica	
2	"Princess Keeps It Real On the Red Carpet" (Extended scene)	Princess, Paris, Donatella	
3	"Marcus' Girlfriend Has Questions About Brooke"	Marcus, Stassia	
3	"A1 Gets Salty" (Extended scene)	A1, Ray J, Fizz, RoccStar	
4	"When Lucifer Comes To Moniece's Doorstep" (Extended scene)	Moniece, A.D., Misster Ray	
4	"No More Ear Rubs for Brooke"	Brooke, Bridget	
5	"Tiny House Party"	Marcus, A1, Loyd, Solo Lucci	
5	"Loyd Calls Out A1 For Acting Hollywood"	Marcus, A1, Loyd, Solo Lucci	
6	"Kimberly and Moniece's Petty Party" (Extended scene)	K. Michelle, Moniece	
6	"Roccstar and Amber Diamond's First Impressions"	Roccstar, La'Britney, Amber	
7	"Akbar Thinks About His Future With Teairra"	Akbar, Alejandra	
7	"Marcus' Probation Is Lifted"	Marcus	
8	"I Love Lucci"	Solo Lucci, Brooke, Marcus	
8	"La'Britney Dishes On Her Drama With Lyrica" (Extended scene)	La'Britney, Paris, Nikki	
9	"Teairra Mari Fights for Justice" (Extended scene)	Teairra	
9	"Roccstar Butters Up Bridget" (Extended scene)	Roccstar, Bridget, Donatella	
10	"La'Britney and Moniece Squash Their Beef"	La'Britney, Moniece	
10	"Moniece and La'Britney Talk Motherhood" (Extended scene)	Moniece, La'Britney, Teairra	
11	"Pam Wants the Last Word" (Extended scene)	Lyrica Garrett, Pam	
11	"Apple Works on Her Relationship with Her Father" (Extended scene)	Apple, John	
12	"Brooke Spills the Tea to Moniece"	Brooke, Moniece	
12	"Paris' Wild Night Out"	Brooke, Teairra, Moniece, La'Britney, Bridget, Paris	
13	"Fizz Dumps Tiffany"	Fizz, Tiffany	
13	"Fizz Gets Back in the Game"	Fizz	
14	"Teairra Mari's Savage Advice"	Teairra, Donatella	
14	"A.D. Offers Tiffany an Apology"	A.D., Tiffany	
15	"Loyd and Patrice Share Their Concerns with Pam"	Pam, Loyd, Patrice	
15	"Apple Wants to Know the Truth"	Apple, John	
16	"JayWill's Special Surprise" (Extended scene)	JayWill, Misster Ray, Kimberly, Moniece	
16	"Kandie and Misster Ray Make a Splash"	JayWill, Misster Ray, Moniece	

== Music ==
Several cast members had their music featured on the show and released singles to coincide with the airing of the episodes.

List of songs performed and/or featured in Love & Hip Hop: Hollywood season five
Title	Performer	Album	Episode(s)	Notes	Ref
God, Love, Sex and Drugs	K. Michelle	Kimberly: The People I Used to Know	1	performed onstage	
Skrr Skrr	Solo Lucci	single	1	performed onstage	
Rent (feat. Blac Youngsta)	Lyrica Anderson	single	2	performed onstage	
West Side Up	RoccStar	single	3	played in studio session	
Special Delivery	Bridget Kelly	Cut to... Bridget Kelly	3	performed onstage	
Baecation	Teairra Marí	single	4	performed in music video shoot	
One in a Million	Apple Watts	single	5	performed in onstage	
Booty Drop	La'Britney	single	5	performed in onstage	
Come & Go	Jay Will (as Kandie)	single	5	performed in onstage	
Mac Down	A1	single	6	performed in music video shoot	
Drive By	Amber Diamond	single	6	performed in studio session	
Change	Brooke Valentine	single	15	performed onstage	
December Love	Lyrica Garrett	single	16	performed onstage	
Save Me	K. Michelle	single	18	performed onstage	
