= Love & Hip Hop: Hollywood season 6 =

Love & Hip Hop: Hollywood
- Season 6
- Cover used by the iTunes Store
- Starring: K. Michelle; Apryl Jones; Lil' Fizz; Yo-Yo; Lyrica Anderson; A1 Bentley; Princess Love; Ray J
- No. of episodes: 21

Release
- Original network: VH1
- Original release: August 5 – December 23, 2019

Season chronology
- ← Previous; Season 5

The sixth and final season of the reality television series Love & Hip Hop: Hollywood aired on VH1 from August 5, 2019 until December 23, 2019. It was primarily filmed in Los Angeles, California. It is executively produced by Mona Scott-Young and Stephanie Gayle for Monami Entertainment, Dan Cesareo, Lucilla D'Agostino, Donna Edge Rachell, Oji Singletary and Thomas Jaeger for Big Fish Entertainment, and Nina L. Diaz and Vivian Gomez for VH1.

The series chronicles the lives of several women and men in the Los Angeles area, involved in hip hop music. It consists of 21 episodes, including a three-part reunion special hosted by Nina Parker.

== Production ==
On October 23, 2018, VH1 announced that they had taken Eastern TV off the series, inviting "new producers to come and pitch for (the show) as it looks to take (it) in a new direction". Season six of Love & Hip Hop: Hollywood began filming in March 2019, with Big Fish Entertainment taking over as the show's production company.

On July 8, 2019, VH1 announced Love & Hip Hop: Hollywood would be returning for a sixth season on August 5, 2019, along with a teaser confirming the return of Apryl Jones and Lil' Fizz to the main cast. New cast members would include Yo-Yo, rapper Micky Munday, J-Boog, Brittany B. and Akon's wife Tricia Ana. Brooke Valentine would leave the series after deciding to take a break after the birth of her child. At the same time, Moniece Slaughter would return as a supporting cast member, with Moniece announcing on social media that the season would be her last. Teairra Marí and Nikki Mudarris would also return late into the season in supporting roles.

On July 23, 2019, VH1 released an extended teaser. On July 17, 2019, VH1 began releasing "meet the cast" interview promos with cast members Apryl, Princess, Zellswag, Moniece, A1, Lyrica and Ray J. On July 29, 2019, VH1 released a 5 minute super-trailer.

=== Reception ===
The season would be the first of the franchise without its trademark cinematic aesthetic and high budget production values, instead resembling Big Fish Entertainment's other VH1 productions, such as Black Ink Crew. The season's premiere episode did not feature an opening credits sequence and the green screen confessional scenes were completely revamped, with cast members speaking in front of a blue backdrop and occasionally sharing confessionals together. Reactions to the show's visual changes were mixed to negative, with former main cast member Hazel-E tweeting "It went from #Hollywood to the hood". The season had the lowest-rated premiere episode in the show's history, dipping under 2 million viewers for the first time. Subsequent episodes would have the opening credits reinstated, while green screen scenes would return to their original look.

== Cast ==
=== Starring ===
- K. Michelle^{1} (12 episodes)
- Apryl Jones (19 episodes)
- Lil' Fizz (19 episodes)
- Yo-Yo (12 episodes)
- Lyrica Anderson (19 episodes)
- A1 Bentley (17 episodes)
- Princess Love (14 episodes)
- Ray J (17 episodes)

Note:

1. Credited onscreen as "Kimberly".

=== Also starring ===
- J-Boog (13 episodes)
- Jason Lee (14 episodes)
- Brittany B. (16 episodes)
- Moniece Slaughter (12 episodes)
- Apple Watts (15 episodes)
- Misster Ray (15 episodes)
- Zell Swag (19 episodes)
- Paris Phillips (18 episodes)
- Micky Munday (17 episodes)
- Daniel "Booby" Gibson (14 episodes)
- Tricia Ana (5 episodes)
- Lyrica Garrett (10 episodes)
- Pam Bentley (8 episodes)
- Teairra Marí (10 episodes)
- Nikki Mudarris (3 episodes)

Shanda Denyce, Willie Taylor and Nia Riley return in guest roles. The show also features minor appearances from notable figures within the hip hop industry and Hollywood's social scene, including Love & Hip Hop: Miami's Spectacular, Lil' Ronnie, Blac Chyna, Kimberly's surrogate Tonai, Kurupt, Summer Bunni, Lyrica's friend Sia Amun, Love & Hip Hop: Atlanta's Yung Joc and Karlie Redd, T-Pain, Akon, Slick Woods, Willie Norwood, Marques Houston, Romeo and LDB of IMx, Dalvin Degrate, Kristian Bush, Black Ink Crew: Chicago's Ryan Henry, Melyssa Ford, Big Mike, Asian Doll, Claude Kelly and Chuck Harmony of Louis York and Jess Hilarious.

== Episodes ==
No. overall	No. in season	Title	Original release date	U.S. viewers (millions)
77	1	"Hot Girl Summer"	August 5, 2019	1.74
B2K jump back into the spotlight as their "Millennium Tour" kicks off and B2K baby mamas Apryl and Moniece go at it. Lyrica and A1's troubled marriage is rocked when the blogs find tea on A1. Ray J and Princess try to spice things up after the birth of their baby girl, Melody. guest stars: Spectacular (entrepreneur & musician), Booby, Lil' Ronnie (music producer), DJ Damage, Blac Chyna (entrepreneur), Tonai (Kimberly's surrogate), Keyontay (Tonai's boyfriend), Lyrica Garrett J-Boog and Brittany B join the supporting cast. Summer Bunni appears only in Instagram footage.
78	2	"Bad Bunny"	August 12, 2019	1.53
Moniece and Apryl come to a resolution, but not everyone is happy about it. Hip-hop legend, Yo-Yo, takes Apple Watts under her wing. guest stars: Kurupt (recording artist), Sia (Lyrica's friend), Summer Bunni (aspiring recording artist), Antonio (Summer's manager), Tonai (Kimberly's surrogate), Keyontay (Tonai's boyfriend), Blac Chyna (entrepreneur), Dr. Steinberg (fertility specialist) Apryl, Fizz and Yo-Yo are added to the opening credits, replacing Teairra, Moniece, Nikki and Brooke. Yo-Yo joins the cast. Although credited, A1 does not appear.
79	3	"The Marathon Continues"	August 19, 2019	1.60
L.A. deals with the loss of Nipsey Hussle. Lyrica finally receives the answers she's been searching for from Summer Bunni. Drama continues to unfold on the Millennium Tour. guest stars: Summer Bunni (aspiring recording artist), Antonio, Booby, Joc, Mo Quick (radio co-host), Spectacular (entrepreneur/recording artist), Kurupt (recording artist), DJ Damage, Pam, Sia (Lyrica's friend), T-Pain (recording artist), Moosa (A1's bodyguard), Mikko Griffin (A1's cousin) Micky Munday joins the supporting cast. Although credited, Kimberly does not appear.
80	4	"Wreckless"	August 26, 2019	1.17
Lyrica contemplates how she will move forward in her marriage. Brittany B. considers helping Moniece and Apryl with their tour. Things go left when Zell and Paris show up at Brittany's party. Micky's ex and Akon's wife, Tricia Ana, pops up on the scene. guest stars: Craig Smith (professional ball player), Chris Staples (professional ball player), Anthony Ware (realtor), Jay'Lona (Micky's daughter), Chelsea (Micky's sister), Dale (Micky's dad), Kelly (Micky's mom), Akon (recording artist and entrepreneur), Stevie Mackey (vocal coach), Eric Bellinger (recording artist) Tricia Ana joins the supporting cast. Although credited, Yo-Yo and Ray J do not appear. Slick Woods appears only in archival footage.
81	5	"Dogged Out"	September 2, 2019	1.29
Princess and Ray J go all out to find their missing dog. Jason Lee hosts a showcase, which includes drama on and off the stage. Tricia has an awkward run in with Micky's new girl. Fizz and Apryl's friends have concerns about their relationship. guest stars: Lyrica Garrett, Slick Woods (supermodel), Marques Houston (recording artist), La Buck (Ray J's friend), Eric (Ray J's friend), Harley (Ray J's friend), David Weintraub (Ray J's manager), William (friend of Ray J's friend), Willie (Ray J's father), Tatum (Princess' friend), Sade (psychic), Sia (Lyrica's friend) Although credited, Yo-Yo does not appear.
82	6	"Thick as Thieves"	September 9, 2019	1.14
A1 confronts Lyrica after she posts sexy pictures online; The search for Boogatti takes a turn for the worse; J-Boog expresses his true feelings about Fizz and Apryl; Yo-Yo has a hard time balancing work and motherhood. guest stars: Jay'Lona (Micky's daughter), Branden BeatBoy (producer), Liz, Christina and Dayna (Apryl's friends), Jerome Jones (recording artist), Marques Houston (recording artist), Kelton Kessee (recording artist), Tiffany (YoYo's daughter), Sanai (YoYo's daughter), Coco, Boogatti, Pam Although credited, Kimberly does not appear. Summer Bunni appears only in Instagram footage.
83	7	"Fed Up"	September 16, 2019	1.34
Apryl attends B2K's L.A. concert raising more eyebrows about her relationship with Fizz. Kimberly begins to have serious reservations about her surrogate. Lyrica reaches her breaking point with A1. Pam and Lyrica G face each other. guest stars: Robert Walmsley (Kimberly's lawyer), Tonai (Kimberly's surrogate), Spectacular (entrepreneur & musician), Dr. Anil Gandhi (plastic surgeon), Sia (Lyrica's friend), Bonnie (Apple's "sister") Although credited, Yo-Yo and Princess do not appear.
84	8	"Oh Mama"	September 23, 2019	1.33
Lyrica is heartbroken when she discovers new cheating intel against A1. Apple recovers from both physical and emotional scars. Apryl's trip home to Chicago further proves her dedication to Fizz. K. Michelle hash out her concerns with Tonai. guest stars: Tonai (Kimberly's surrogate), Shiao-Chee (Apryl's mother), Nate (Apryl's stepfather), Bonnie (Apple's "sister"), Dalvin Degrate (recording artist), Dominque (Apple's sister), Henri (Apple's mother), Kristian Bush (recording artist), Sia, Ryan Henry (Apryl's friend), Blaze (Apryl's producer), Willie & Shanda (Apryl's friends) Although credited, Yo-Yo and Princess do not appear.
85	9	"Pretty Petty"	September 30, 2019	1.33
Moniece and Apryl are surprised when K. Michelle trashes them on Hollywood Unlocked. Princess launches her makeup line, but her party takes a turn for the worse when Apryl confronts Jason. The crews takes off for a big trip to Vegas. guest stars: Sia (Lyrica's friend), Melyssa Ford (co-host), DJ Damage (co-host), Dale (Micky's dad), Jay'Lona (Micky's daughter), Slick Woods (supermodel), Kelly (Micky's mom), Lex Lu (artist developer) Although credited, Yo-Yo and Lyrica do not appear.
86	10	"Struggle Bus"	October 7, 2019	1.26
The Vegas trip is off to a fiery start with Brittany and Apple clashing with the crew. J-Boog moves forward with the IMx tour, but discovers there is tension between Ray J and Marques. Apple has an emotional family reunion. guest stars: Marques Houston (recording artist), Kelton Kessee (recording artist), Dominique (Apple's sister), Henri (Apple's mother), Richard (Apple's son), Lynetta (Apple's aunt) Although credited, Kimberly, Apryl, Fizz and Yo-Yo do not appear. A1 and Princess appear in archive footage only.
87	11	"What Happens in Vegas"	October 14, 2019	1.29
The Vegas trip ends with an attempt to bring Lyrica and A1 back together. Princess is angry when Ray J decides to miss Melody's birthday weekend to go to Vegas. Questions about Apryl and Fizz's relationship arise once again. guest stars: C'Marie (recording artist), Kris (Jason's brother), Link (Jason's brother), Chris (Jason's brother), Elizabeth (Link's wife), Belinda (Jason's sister), Spectacular (entrepreneur & recording artist), Mytae (Jason's niece), Evelyn (Rodney's mom) Although credited, Kimberly and Yo-Yo do not appear.
88	12	"Picture Perfect"	October 21, 2019	1.16
Fizz and Apryl become a hot topic when Zell tells everyone about catching them in bed together. Princess reveals a secret to Ray. Yo-Yo throws a baby shower for her daughter. guest stars: Blac Chyna (entrepreneur), Brooke (Fizz's sister), Mia (Yo-Yo's mother), Tiffany (Yo-Yo's daughter), Sanai (Yo-Yo's daughter), Slick Woods (supermodel), Moneke, Teairra Marí Although credited, Kimberly and A1 do not appear.
89	13	"Paparazzi"	October 28, 2019	1.16
Teairra makes her return to Hollywood. Zell airs out Fizz and Apryl's relationship with help from Jason Lee. Princess is having a hard time forgiving Ray J. guest stars: Tiffany (YoYo's daughter), Big Mike (recording artist and entrepreneur), Slick Woods (supermodel) Although credited, Kimberly, A1 and Lyrica do not appear.
90	14	"Sound Off"	November 4, 2019	1.12
Moniece and Fizz's turbulent co-parenting relationship puts a major strain of her emotional well-being. Lyrica and A1 reunite, much to Lyrica G's dismay. Brittany B and Yo-Yo get back on the music scene. Love is in the air for Zell. guest stars: Asian Doll (recording artist), Reggie Rojo Jr. (engineer), DJ Damage (co-host), Melyssa Ford (co-host), Slick Woods (supermodel), Star Divine (Zell’s boo) Although credited, Kimberly, Princess and Ray J do not appear.
91	15	"With Friends Like These"	November 11, 2019	1.26
Moniece starts a social media feud against Fizz and Apryl. Teairra overstays her welcome at Paris and Zell's place. Lyrica performs onstage and comes to a resolution about the state of her marriage. Kimberly records country music and sets up her future career plans. guest stars: Brooke (Fizz’s sister), Nia Riley, LongLiveCzar (music producer), Carter (Apryl’s friend), Slick Woods (supermodel), Lil’ Ronnie (music producer), Claude Kelly (Louis York), Chuck Harmony (Louis York), Sabrina (Kimberly’s friend), Karlie Redd, Tonai (Kimberly’s surrogate), Jess Hilarious (comedian) Although credited, Yo-Yo, Princess and Ray J do not appear.
92	16	"Showstopper"	November 18, 2019	1.28
Tensions rise and a fight ensues at Zell's fashion show. Yo-Yo becomes a grandmother. J-Boog is infuriated when Fizz and Apryl's relationship ruins an opportunity. Brittany B works on her relationship with her mom. guest stars: Sanai (YoYo's daughter), Tiffany (YoYo's daughter), Moosa (A1's friend), Star Divine (Zell's boo), JD (Empire Rep.), Moneke (Brittany's mother), Thomas Cecil (pastor) Although credited, Kimberly, Princess and Ray J do not appear.
93	17	"Dirty 30"	November 25, 2019	1.29
Yo-Yo's party goes awry when Summer Bunni pops up. Apple and Summer bump heads, and Apple's friend worry that she's losing herself. Ray J prepares for the Immature tour with help from Brandy. Brittany and Lyrica face off. guest stars: Cece (co-host), Mia (YoYo’s mother), Romeo (co-host), Sanai (YoYo’s daughter), Blac Chyna (entrepreneur), Summer Bunni (aspiring recording artist), Brandy (Ray J’s sister) Although credited, Kimberly, Apryl, Fizz and Princess do not appear.
94	18	"Unbothered"	December 2, 2019	1.19
Lyrica and A1 struggle to save their marriage. Moniece seeks treatment for her mental health. Apple confides in Yo-Yo and Misster Ray after her latest meltdown on social media. Kimberly says goodbye to Los Angeles. Ray J and Immature perform. guest stars: Blac Chyna, Marques Houston, Kelton Kessee (recording artist), Jerome Jones (recording artist), Dr. Ally (mental health expert), Tonai (Kimberly’s surrogate), Mia, Tiffany
95	19	"Reunion – Part 1"	December 9, 2019	1.38
Host Nina Parker and fan-favorite Kendall Kyndall join our cast to unpack a season filled with drama. A1 and Lyrica address the problems in their marriage. Apple Watts drops by to give an update. Apryl and Fizz come armed with their own tea. host: Nina Parker backstage correspondent: Kendall Kyndall guest stars: Sia, Marques Houston
96	20	"Reunion – Part 2"	December 16, 2019	1.38
Tensions continue to escalate between B2K, Apryl and Jason Lee. Meanwhile, Lyrica, Sia and Brittany B finally get to the bottom of their beef and discuss about what happened in Vegas certainly did not stay there. host: Nina Parker backstage correspondent: Kendall Kyndall guest stars: Sia, Marques Houston
97	21	"Reunion – Part 3"	December 23, 2019	1.32
On the conclusion of the Love and Hip Hop Hollywood Reunion, Brittany B is confronted about her career, A1 and Lyrica attempt to resolve their relationship woes, and we say goodbye as one of the OGs makes their exit from the Hollywood family. host: Nina Parker backstage correspondent: Kendall Kyndall guest stars: Sia, Marques Houston

== Webisodes ==
=== Check Yourself ===
Love & Hip Hop Hollywood: Check Yourself, which features the cast's reactions to each episode, was released weekly with every episode on digital platforms.

List of Love & Hip Hop Hollywood: Check Yourself Season 6 episodes

List of Love & Hip Hop Hollywood: Check Yourself Season 6 episodes
Episode	Title	Featured cast members	Ref
1	"Jason Lee's Got the Dirt and Lyrica Comes Back Home"	Fizz, Jason Lee, Misster Ray, Moniece, Lyrica, Lyrica Garrett	
2	"Apple and Summer Bunni Meet & Kimberly Speaks Her Mind"	Lyrica, Lyrica Garrett, Misster Ray, Apple Watts, Brittany B., Jason Lee, Apryl, Moniece	
3	"Micky Munday Is an Urban Rock Star & A1's Mom Tears Into Him"	Misster Ray, Brittany B., Moniece, Fizz, Lyrica, Lyrica Garrett, Pam	
4	"Brittany B. Offers Advice & Booby Sets His Sights on Apryl"	Fizz, Apryl, Misster Ray, Brittany B., Lyrica Garrett, Micky Munday	
5	"Ray J Launches a Search Party for His Lost Dog"	Moniece, Misster Ray, Tricia Ana, Micky Munday, Apryl	
6	"Apryl Gets Fired & Lyrica Walks Out on A1"	Micky Munday, Brittany B., Tricia Ana, Misster Ray	
7	"Apple Watts Gets Sized Up & Fizz Gets on the Defensive"	Apryl, Micky Munday, Misster Ray, Brittany B.	
8	"Lyrica Moves Out"	Micky Munday, Tricia Ana, Brittany B., Booby, Misster Ray	
9	"Apryl Quits the Tour"	Misster Ray, Tricia Ana, Micky Munday, Booby	
10	"What Happens in Vegas"	Booby, Micky Munday, Tricia Ana	
11	"A Clash in Sin City"	Misster Ray, Booby, Micky Munday	
12	"Rumors Keep Swirling"	Misster Ray, Fizz, Booby, Micky Munday, Apryl, Moniece	
13	"An Unexpected Guest"	Micky Munday, Misster Ray, Booby	
14	"Apryl and Fizz Unpack"	Micky Munday, Booby	
15	"Differences Aside"	Micky Munday, Brittany B., Tricia Ana, Teairra Marí	
16	"Fashion Faux Pas"	Brittany B., Tricia Ana, Micky Munday, Teairra Marí	
17	"Yo-Yo's Birthday"	Teairra Marí, Apryl, Paris, Zellswag, Fizz	
18	"Lyrica's Next Step"	Teairra Marí, Fizz, Paris, Zellswag	

=== Bonus scenes ===
Deleted scenes from the season's episodes were released weekly as bonus content on VH1's official website.

List of Love & Hip Hop: Hollywood Season 6 bonus scenes

List of Love & Hip Hop: Hollywood Season 6 bonus scenes
Episode	Title	Featured cast members	Ref
1	"Lyrica Confronts Jason Lee About His Blog Post" (Extended scene)	Lyrica, Lyrica Garrett, Jason Lee	
2	"Apple Doesn't Hold Back During Her Lunch Date"	Apple Watts	
3	"Apryl Breaks Some News" (Extended scene)	Apryl, Paris, Zellswag	
4	"Lyrica Garrett Dishes Out Some Tough Love"	Lyrica Garrett, Lyrica	
5	"Zellswag and Apryl Put Each Other on the Hot Seat" (Extended scene)	Zellswag, Apryl, Paris	
6	"Search Party" (Extended scene)	Ray J, A1, Zellswag	
7	"Lyrica Wants to Move Forward Without A1" (Extended scene)	Lyrica, Lyrica Garrett, Kimberly	
8	"Apryl Visits Black Ink Crew Chicago" (Extended scene)	Apryl, Paris	
9	"A1's Mom Tells Him to Work Things Out with Lyrica"	A1, Zellswag, Pam	
10	"Zellswag and Paris Blow Off Some Steam"	Zellswag, Paris	
11	"Jason Lee Confronts His Grief"	Jason Lee	
12	"Micky Munday Refuses to Lose"	Micky Munday, Ray J, Booby, Zellswag, Paris	
13	"Apple, Kimberly and Lyrica Catch Up"	Apple, Kimberly, Lyrica	
14	"Moniece Airs Her Co-Parenting Drama on the Radio"	Moniece, Jason Lee	
15	"Who Leaked Apryl's Instagram Live Video?"	Apryl	
16	"Yo-Yo and Apple Don't Get Stressed Over Motherhood" (Extended scene)	Yo-Yo, Apple	
17	"Do You Feel Like a Rapper Yet?" (Extended scene)	Brittany B.	
18	"Kimberly Is Ready to Move On"	Kimberly, Brittany B.	

== Music ==
Several cast members had their music featured on the show and released singles to coincide with the airing of the episodes.

List of songs performed and/or featured in Love & Hip Hop: Hollywood season six
Title	Performer	Album	Episode(s)	Notes	Ref
Secret (feat. T-Pain)	A1	single	3	performed onstage	
Beautiful Lies	Micky Munday	Beautiful Lies, Vol. 1	5	performed onstage	
OMG	Zellswag	As Seen on TV	16	played at party	
Mirrors	Fizz	single	16	performed in studio session	
Somebody	Teairra Marí	single	17	performed in studio session	
Out of Control (feat. Patient Picasso, Brittany B & Tyeler Reign)	Yo-Yo	single	17	performed onstage	
The Rain	K. Michelle	All Monsters Are Human	18	played at party	
