= Billy Pollina =

American film producer

William Vito Pollina (born June 25, 1961) is an American film and television writer, producer and director.

Pollina was born in Harvey, Illinois to Italian immigrants from Sicily. He studied theater at the American Academy of Dramatic Arts (AADA). Pollina was a theater fan, and would promote concerts and plays at an early age. His first film role was a bit part in Richard Rush's slapstick cop drama Freebie and the Bean.

After high school in San Mateo, CA., Pollina moved to Los Angeles where he worked various jobs pursuing an acting career, and eventually moved into production work. One of his first jobs was working with children's television producers Sid and Marty Krofft.

During the 1980s and 1990s, he ran a film and television marketing company called Optical Nerve. Beyond writing, producing and directing hundreds of trailers and TV spots, Pollina designed and created the first DVD interactive menu for home video specialist Warren Lieberfarb at Warner Home Video, for Clint Eastwood's Academy Award winning film Unforgiven.

Pollina was President of Optical Nerve when it served as one of Fox Sports Net's marketing companies during FSN's initial launch. He left marketing to pursue television and film development in 2000 and teamed with several television writers to produce short films such as 2002's Mackenheim.

His first film success was with 2004's You Got Served, a film about street dance battling and B-boying. The film opened at No. 1 at the box office and received two MTV Movie Award nominations.

In addition to his work in film and television, Billy Pollina has been an activist for LGBTQ rights since the 1980s and the onset of the AIDS crisis. He served as marketing director for The Courage Campaign and was one of the founding organizers for The National Equality March in Washington D.C. in 2009.

Pollina spends his time in Los Angeles, the San Francisco Bay Area and New York.
