= You Got Served =

2004 film by Chris Stokes

- Theatrical release poster
- Directed by: Chris Stokes
- Written by: Chris Stokes
- Produced by: Marcus Morton; Cassius Vernon Weathersby; Billy Pollina; Kris Cruz Toledo
- Starring: Marques Houston; Omari Grandberry; Jarrell Houston; De'Mario Thornton; Dreux Frederic; Jennifer Freeman; Lil' Kim; Michael "Bear" Taliferro; Alani "La La" Vasquez; Meagan Good; Steve Harvey
- Cinematography: David Hennings
- Edited by: Earl Watson
- Music by: Tyler Bates
- Production companies: The Ultimate Group Films; Melee Entertainment
- Distributed by: Screen Gems (through Sony Pictures Releasing)
- Release date: January 30, 2004
- Running time: 95 minutes
- Country: United States
- Language: English
- Budget: $8 million
- Box office: $50.6 million

You Got Served is a 2004 American dance drama film written and directed by Chris Stokes, who was also the business manager of the performers who were the film's main characters: recording artist Marques Houston and the boy band B2K.

Filmed between May 1 and June 25, 2003, the movie follows a group of dancers who take part in a street dancing competition.

Released on January 30, 2004 by Screen Gems, the film received negative reviews from critics but was a box office success, grossing $51 million against an $8 million budget. It was followed by a sequel, You Got Served: Beat the World (2011).

== Plot ==
In Los Angeles, California, Elgin Smith III and his best friend David lead their promising dance crew (which consists of fellow dancers Rico, Rashaan, and Sonny) in street dancing battles at a warehouse owned by the battles' host Mr. Rad. Rico mentors a young aspiring dancer named Teshawn Miller, dubbed as the crew's mascot "Lil Saint". David and Elgin finance the battles by operating as runners for a drug lord named Emerald. One day, Wade, a wealthy white dancer from Orange County, challenges them for $5,000. Later, the duo discuss the challenge with the crew; they will put up the whole $5,000, and if victorious, they will split $3,000, with the others splitting the remaining $2,000. Sonny insists on dividing the $5,000 evenly, but the others feel that Elgin and David put up the money and therefore deserve most of the profits.

While Elgin, David and their crew are playing basketball, Wade and his best friend Max approach them, surprised that Elgin accepted their challenge. When Wade and Max mockingly demand it occur that night, Elgin pridefully accepts and borrows the remaining $1,500 from his grandmother to supplement his and David's $3,500. A few minutes after David and Elgin arrive at the venue, Sonny arrives but then sides with Wade's crew, shocking the duo. A brawl occurs after the duo realize that Sonny taught their own routine to Wade's team, which victoriously takes over Mr. Rad’s warehouse.

Openly discussing their loss on the basketball court, Elgin and David are approached by a rival dancer named Vick, who asks to join their crew as his had disbanded after repeated losses. David departs for a date with Elgin's sister Liyah, a medical student, informing Elgin that he will meet him separately before they visit Emerald for extra shifts. During the date, David's friends incessantly call him, irritating Liyah. Emerald tasks Elgin to deliver a batch of drugs with David, but Liyah turns off David's phone before he can answer Elgin's call; local thugs ambush Elgin and steal Emerald's money, leaving him hospitalized, disappointing Emerald and infuriating David.

Separating, David and Elgin form their own crews. Rico neutrally tells both about the "Big Bounce", a $50,000 dance competition sponsored by MTV, which will allow the winning crew to perform in a Lil' Kim video and also allow Elgin to pay back Emerald and his grandmother. Attempts to help Elgin and David reconcile, particularly by Liyah and Rico, fail as Elgin repeatedly refuses to listen to reason, exhausting David. Later on, Emerald and his guards confront Elgin, warning him that he will become permanently crippled unless he returns the money to Emerald within a few weeks.

Many crews, including Wade's, impress the judges in the qualifying rounds of the Big Bounce. Meanwhile, Liyah discloses David and Elgin's problems to Mr. Rad, who reveals that his friend, an off-duty LAPD officer named Mr. Chuck, will handle Emerald and explains that the duo must resolve their issues to avoid further defeat. Meanwhile, David's crew is eliminated after two slip-ups, while Elgin's crew proceeds to the finals. While Liyah and David are discussing his elimination in a diner, Rashann rushes in, revealing that Lil' Saint was fatally wounded in a drive-by shooting. The next day, Rico suggests that Elgin reunite the crew to honor Lil' Saint. David arrives shortly afterwards, but explains that they must compete with their initial crews without adding members.

The Big Bounce finals, hosted by Wade Robson and Lil' Kim, features multiple crews performing their routines. When Elgin's crew (renamed "The Lil' Saints") and Wade's crew tie for the win, Lil' Kim declares a head-to-head battle competition with no rules, effectively allowing others to join the battling crews. David asks to join Elgin's crew; despite Elgin's initial refusal, Rico stresses David's importance, and Elgin forgivingly invites him. Inspired by their namesake, the Lil' Saints win after receiving the crowd's loudest approval. After Elgin accepts David and Liyah as a couple, Wade and Max confront them, insisting they just got lucky. David retorts, "Y'all just mad, 'cause today, you suckas got served." As the crowd chants "served", Wade and Max depart and David and Elgin celebrate their $50,000 check with their friends and family.

== Cast ==
- Marques Houston as Elgin Smith III; co-leader of the Lil' Saints and David's best friend
- Omari "Omarion" Grandberry as David; co-leader of the Lil Saints and Elgin's best friend who has a crush on Liyah
- Jarrell "J-Boog" Houston as Rico; friend of Elgin and David, member of the Lil' Saints, mentor and brother figure to TeShawn "Lil Saint" Miller
- De'Mario "Raz-B" Thornton as Vick; member of the Lil Saints
- Dreux "Lil' Fizz" Frederic as Rashann; friend of Rico, Elgin, and David, member of the Lil' Saints
- Jennifer Freeman as Liyah Smith; med student and Elgin's sister who has a crush on David
- Meagan Good as "Beautifull"; Liyah's comforting best friend
- Steve Harvey as Mr. Rad; owner of the warehouse where dance battles take place, gives advice to Elgin and David
- Christopher Jones as Wade; rival of Elgin and David
- Jerome "Young Rome" Jones as Sonny; former crew member of Elgin and David who betrays them
- Robert Hoffman as Max; friend of Wade and member of Wade's Crew
- Malcolm David Kelley as TeShawn "Lil Saint" Miller; crew member of David, dies before the Big Bounce dance battles
- Jackée Harry as Mama Smith; mother of Elgin and Liyah
- Esther Scott as Grandmama; grandmother of Elgin and Liyah
- Michael Taliferro as "Emerald"; crime boss who Elgin and David work for
- Wade Robson as Himself
- Lil' Kim as Herself
- La La Anthony as Herself
- Simon Rugala as Choreographer
- Kevin Federline as Dancer
- Clifford McGhee as Dancer
- Dyneisha Rollins as Dancer
- Columbus Short as Dancer
- Harry Shum Jr. as Dancer
- Mike Bodden as Dancer
- Aaron Davis as Dancer
- Simon Au as Dancer
- Orlando Perry as Dancer
- Babbal Kumar as Dancer

== Soundtrack ==
You Got Served: Music from the Motion Picture

Soundtrack album by B2K and various artists
- Released: December 23, 2003
- Genres: R&B; hip hop
- Label: Epic
- Producers: Chris Stokes, Marques Houston, DR Period, Tony Scott, Precision, J Classic, Pruven, Top Dawg, Big Tank, Jazz Nixon

The film soundtrack features songs primarily by B2K, but also Marques Houston, and many others. There were some profanities in the soundtrack such as "Streets Is Callin'" but did not receive a PA label. The soundtrack was released on December 23, 2003, through Epic Records. Also, there was a release of a music video for B2K's single "Badaboom" featuring Fabolous and Marques Houston was the guest appearance. The soundtrack peaked at No. 34 on the Billboard 200, No. 7 on the Top R&B/Hip-Hop Albums chart, and No. 2 on the Top Soundtracks chart. The single "Badaboom" performed by B2K and Fabolous reached No. 59 on the Billboard Hot 100. This is the last album B2K made together before their break up in 2004 and before coming back in 2018.

AllMusic rated the soundtrack three out of five points.

Track listing

1. "Badaboom" - 3:41 (B2K featuring Fabolous) Vocals: Omarion, Raz-B, J-Boog
2. "Do That Thing" - 3:36 (B2K featuring Lil' Kim)
3. "Take It to the Floor" - 3:42 (B2K)
4. "Sprung" - 3:41 (B2K) Lead Vocals: Omarion (Background Vocals: J-Boog & Raz-B)
5. "Out the Hood" - 4:45 (B2K) Vocals: Omarion and J-Boog
6. "Streets Is Callin'" - 4:13 (B2K)
7. "Fizzo Got Flow" - 3:24 (B2K)
8. "Happy" - 3:44 (Jhené featuring B2K)
9. "Smile" - 3:00 (Marques Houston)
10. "Smellz Like a Party" - 4:12 (O'Ryan featuring Rufus Blaq)
11. "The One" - 3:49 (ATL)
12. "Can I Get It Back" - 3:08 (XSO Drive featuring Red Cafe)
13. "Ante Up" (Robbin Hoodz Theory) - 3:52 (M.O.P. featuring Funkmaster Flex) (produced by DR Period)

Weekly charts for the You Got Served soundtrack
Chart (2004)	Peak position
Australian Albums (ARIA Charts)	71
US Billboard 200	34
US Top R&B/Hip-Hop Albums (Billboard)	7
US Soundtrack Albums (Billboard)	2

Year-end charts for the You Got Served soundtrack
Chart (2004)	Position
US Top R&B/Hip-Hop Albums (Billboard)	87

Certifications and sales for You Got Served soundtrack
Region	Certification	Certified units/sales
United States (RIAA)	Gold	500,000^{^}
^{^} Shipments figures based on certification alone.

== Release ==
The film was released on DVD by Sony Pictures on May 18, 2004. The film debuted for the first time on the Blu-ray format on October 4, 2016, in a triple feature release by Mill Creek Entertainment. The other two films in the bundle include Gridiron Gang (2006) and Stomp the Yard (2007).

== Box office ==
You Got Served opened at the #1 spot in the United States and grossed $40.3 million; the total worldwide gross was $48.6 million.

== Reception ==
On the review aggregator website Rotten Tomatoes, 14% of 70 critics' reviews are positive, with an average rating of 4/10. The website's consensus reads: "The dance sequences are exhilarating, but everything else about this movie is sloppy and generic." Metacritic, which uses a weighted average, assigned the film a score of 37 out of 100, based on 24 critics, indicating "generally unfavorable" reviews. Audiences polled by CinemaScore assigned the film an average grade of "A-" on its A+ to F scale.

== Sequels ==
The official dance tutorials from the film were released shortly after the movie's release in 2004 on a tutorial DVD titled You Got Served, Take It To The Streets.

You Got Served: Beat the World is a straight-to-DVD film released on June 21, 2011, starring Lil' C.

Beat the World is a film written and directed by Robert Adetuyi (writer of Stomp the Yard) released in 2011, by InnerCity Films. It was distributed in the United States on DVD by Sony Home Entertainment under the name You Got Served: Beat the World. The film stars Tyrone Brown, Mishael Morgan, Nikki Grant and Parkour artist Chase Armitage.

The original soundtrack was produced by Frank Fitzpatrick and released on Hip Hop Connect. It features KRS-One, K’naan, Ziggy Marley, Nneka, Les Nubians, MV Bill, Talib Kweli, Sway and Lina.

In 2019, a direct sequel to the film titled You Got Served 2, was announced.
