= Love & Hip Hop: Hollywood =

American reality television series (2014–2019)

- Genre: Reality television
- Created by: Mona Scott-Young
- Starring: Teairra Mari; Moniece Slaughter; Apryl Jones; Hazel-E; Ray J; Lil' Fizz; Omarion; Soulja Boy; Nikki Mudarris; Masika Kalysha; Princess Love; Keyshia Cole; Lyrica Anderson; Safaree Samuels; K. Michelle; Brooke Valentine; A1 Bentley; Yo-Yo
- Country of origin: United States
- Original language: English
- No. of seasons: 6
- No. of episodes: 97 (list of episodes)

Production
- Executive producers: Mona Scott-Young; Toby Barraud; Stefan Springman; Stephanie R. Gayle; Nina L. Diaz; Vivian Gomez; Donell Dorsey
- Running time: 42–44 minutes
- Production companies: Monami Productions; Eastern TV (s. 1–5); Big Fish Entertainment (s. 6)

Original release
- Network: VH1
- Release: September 15, 2014 – December 23, 2019

Related
- Love & Hip Hop: New York; Love & Hip Hop: Atlanta; Love & Hip Hop: Miami

Love & Hip Hop: Hollywood is an American reality television series and the third installment of the Love & Hip Hop franchise. It premiered on September 15, 2014, on VH1 and chronicles the lives of several people in the Hollywood area, involved with hip hop music. The show features appearances from notable figures associated with West Coast hip-hop.

On July 8, 2019, VH1 announced the show's return for a sixth season, which premiered on August 5, 2019. On May 11, 2020, VH1 announced that production on any future seasons would be postponed indefinitely due to the COVID-19 pandemic. The show never returned, and after a series of crossover specials and spin-offs, several Love & Hip Hop: Hollywood cast members were transferred to Love & Hip Hop: Miami from August 23, 2021.

== Series synopsis ==
=== Overview and casting ===
The cast of the fifth season, top row: Lyrica, Brooke, A1, K. Michelle and Moniece. bottom row: Teairra, Princess, Nikki and Ray J.

Love & Hip Hop: Hollywood revolves around the personal and professional struggles of several R&B artists and rappers in Los Angeles' music scene. The series is notable for its high profile cast, with the youngest and most established group of cast members in the franchise thus far. It has a sprawling supporting cast, who (in most cases) share the same amount of screen time and storyline focus as the show's leads.

The original cast consisted of Ray J, Soulja Boy, Omarion and his girlfriend Apryl Jones, Lil' Fizz and his ex-girlfriend Moniece Slaughter, Teairra Marí and former celebrity publicist Hazel-E, with Ray's assistant Morgan Hardman, Teddy Riley's daughter Nia Riley, Fizz's girlfriend Amanda Secor, Yung Berg, radio personality Yesi Ortiz, club promoter Sincere Show, socialite Nikki Mudarris and video vixen Masika Kalysha as supporting cast members. Although not mentioned in the initial cast announcement, Omarion's mother Leslie Burrell would also appear as a supporting cast member.

On November 5, 2014, Yung Berg was arrested for allegedly assaulting his girlfriend and fellow cast member Masika, several hours after the taping of the reunion special. VH1 released a statement that he had been terminated from the show effective immediately. On December 8, 2014, series creator Mona Scott-Young expressed regret for the firing, saying it was a network decision. The two-part reunion aired with a public service announcement about domestic violence, along with a statement by VH1 condemning Berg's actions.

All main cast members from the previous season returned for a second season. Ray J's girlfriend Princess Love joined the supporting cast, along with long time Love & Hip Hop: New York cast member Rich Dollaz, aspiring rappers Miles Brock and Milan Christopher, Miles' ex-girlfriend Amber Laura, Ray J's best friend Brandi Boyd, her husband Max Lux, Willie Taylor and his wife Shanda Denyce. Soulja's fling Nastassia Smith, Fizz's girlfriend Kamiah Adams, gossip blogger Jason Lee and Moniece's mother Marla Thomas would appear in minor supporting roles. Miles and Milan were the first openly gay couple of the franchise and several episodes featured public service announcements aimed to help viewers struggling with their sexual identity.

On September 16, 2015, during filming, Hazel-E announced on social media that she had quit the series, comparing it to a "freak show". Hazel had become increasingly frustrated that she had not been properly credited for her work behind-the-scenes, including her influence on casting, as well as her idea for the show title Love & Hip Hop: Hollywood instead of the original Love & Hip Hop: L.A.. Apryl and Omarion did not attend the taping of the second season reunion as Omarion was on tour. On December 7, 2015, Apryl confirmed the two had quit the show and would not be returning next season.

This third season saw the promotion of long time supporting cast members Nikki Mudarris and Princess Love to the main cast, as well as the return and promotion of Masika Kalysha to main cast after a season's absence. Record producer Floyd "A1" Bentley, his wife Lyrica Anderson, Lyrica's mother Lyrica Garrett, A1's mother Pam Bentley, Nicki Minaj's ex Safaree Samuels and fitness model Rosa Acosta joined the supporting cast. Ray J's mother Sonja Norwood and Willie's alleged mistress Kyesha Shalina would appear in minor supporting roles. Former main cast member Hazel E would return late into the season in a supporting role.

On August 19, 2016, Soulja Boy posted a video of himself on social media, brandishing a gun and threatening to kill Nia Riley and her alleged new boyfriend. From the third episode "For the Love of Money" onwards, Soulja was removed from the opening credits and had nearly all of his scenes deleted, essentially being reduced to a background extra on the two remaining episodes he did appear. On October 4, 2016, Soulja posted "I've decided to quit Love & Hip Hop. I feel my brand is too big for the show now. It's too ratchet." Series creator Mona Scott-Young responded by reposting a meme with the caption "If I ever get fired, I'm gone (sic) tell people I quit to protect my brand".

On March 17, 2017, singer Keyshia Cole revealed that she had joined the cast for its fourth season, along with her estranged ex-husband Daniel "Booby" Gibson. This season saw the promotion of Lyrica Anderson and Safaree Samuels to the main cast, as well as the return of Hazel E after a season's absence. Lil Fizz and Masika Kalysha were demoted to supporting cast members, with Kalysha's demotion being a controversial and allegedly last minute decision, due to her refusal to film with or even discuss longtime rival Alexis Skyy on camera. The season revealed scenes of Kalysha breaking the fourth wall several times to express her displeasure with producers, as well as threatening legal action and storming off set. Brooke Valentine, Gibson, songwriter Marcus Black, stylist Zell Swag, Moniece's girlfriend A.D. Diggs and Fetty Wap's ex Alexis Skyy would all join the supporting cast, along with Chanel West Coast, producer Solo Lucci and Bridget Kelly. Love & Hip Hop: New York cast members Cisco Rosado and Jade Wifey, College Hill star Misster Ray, Alexandra Shipp's brother James Shipp Jr. and A.D.'s friend Tiffany Campbell would also appear in supporting roles.

During the season's reunion special, Safaree announced that he was leaving the show to join the cast of Love & Hip Hop: New York. On October 20, 2017, after sparking violent feuds with nearly every member of the cast and causing controversy for making a series of anti-gay and colorist posts on social media, it was reported that Hazel had been fired from the show. On February 7, 2018, it was reported that Keyshia Cole had quit the show, along with Masika Kalysha.

Season five saw the promotion of A1 and Brooke Valentine to the main cast after appearing previously as supporting cast members, as well as the return of K. Michelle to the franchise, who previously appeared on Love & Hip Hop: Atlanta, Love & Hip Hop: New York and the spin-off K. Michelle: My Life. New cast members include video vixen Apple Watts, singer La'Britney, K. Michelle: My Life's Paris Phillips, Grammy Award-nominated producer RoccStar, manager Shun Love, model Amber Diamond, bisexual rapper and drag performer JayWill, media personality Donatella and Apple's father John Watts.

On October 24, 2018, it was reported that Eastern TV had been fired as a production company for the show, with Big Fish Entertainment taking their place, and there would be a major cast retooling for season six, with more of an focus on "actual couples and big names". Brooke Valentine would leave the series after deciding to take a break after the birth of her child, while Moniece Slaughter would return as a supporting cast member, with Moniece announcing on social media that the season would be her last. Teairra Marí and Nikki Mudarris would also return late into the season in supporting roles. On July 8, 2019, VH1 confirmed the return of Apryl Jones and Fizz to the main cast, along with the addition of Yo-Yo, with new supporting cast members Micky Munday, J-Boog, Brittany B. and Akon's wife Tricia Ana.

The show never returned after the COVID-19 pandemic, instead Ray J and Princess were transferred to the cast of Love & Hip Hop: Miami to continue their storylines.

=== Cast timeline ===
Main cast (appears in opening credits)
Secondary cast (appears in green screen confessional segments and in end credits alongside the main cast)
Guest cast (appears in a guest role or cameo)

Cast member	Seasons					
Cast member	1	2	3	4	5	6
Teairra Marí	Starring	Starring	Starring	Starring	Starring	Supporting
Moniece Slaughter	Starring	Starring	Starring	Starring	Starring	Supporting
Apryl Jones	Starring	Starring		Guest		Starring
Hazel-E	Starring	Starring	Supporting	Starring		
Ray J	Starring	Starring	Starring	Starring	Starring	Starring
Lil' Fizz	Starring	Starring	Starring	Supporting	Supporting	Starring
Omarion	Starring	Starring				
Soulja Boy	Starring (Note: Appears in the opening credits for the first two episodes of season three before being reduced to minor guest appearances for the rest of the season.)	Starring	Starring			
Nikki Mudarris	Supporting	Supporting	Starring	Starring	Starring	Supporting
Masika Kalysha	Supporting		Starring	Supporting		
Princess Love	Guest	Supporting	Starring	Starring	Starring	Starring
Keyshia Cole				Starring		
Lyrica Anderson			Supporting	Starring	Starring	Starring
Safaree Samuels			Supporting	Starring	Guest	
K. Michelle (Note: Credited onscreen as "Kimberly".)					Starring	Starring
Brooke Valentine				Supporting	Starring	
A1 Bentley			Supporting	Supporting	Starring	Starring
Yo-Yo						Starring

=== Storylines ===
Love & Hip Hop: Hollywood chronicles the professional and romantic struggles of women and men in the hip hop industry, as well as the intense and violent rivalries between them. Over the seasons, the show has explored addiction, substance abuse and mental illness.

Many female cast members identify as bisexual, lesbian or sexually fluid, and the show is one of the few television shows to explore LGBT issues from a black perspective. Homophobia in the hip hop world is explored in greater depth in the second season when openly gay rappers Milan and Miles join the cast.

== Episodes ==
Season	Episodes	Originally released	
Season	Episodes	First released	Last released
1	14	September 15, 2014	December 9, 2014
2	14	September 7, 2015	December 7, 2015
3	14	August 15, 2016	November 14, 2016
4	16	July 24, 2017	October 23, 2017
5	18	July 23, 2018	November 19, 2018
6	21	August 5, 2019	December 23, 2019

== Development ==
Rumors of a Los Angeles-based spin-off of Love & Hip Hop began circulating in September 2013. In an interview, creator Mona Scott Young confirmed that the concept was being considered, along with possible spin-offs in Houston and New Orleans, saying "we've been looking in a few cities. It's feeling like we'll land in L.A., we've got some great stories to tell in L.A." On October 11, 2013, it was reported that producers had approached Tyga, Blac Chyna, Karrueche Tran, LoLa Monroe, Bow Wow's ex-girlfriend Miss Joie and Christina Milian's boyfriend Jas Prince to star in Love & Hip Hop: L.A. Ray J was also offered to star, as both lead and co-producer, with his protege Yung Berg and love interests Teairra Marí and Princess Love rounding out the cast. Cassie was offered a supporting role. On October 15, 2013, Tran reportedly backed out of the show at her (then) boyfriend Chris Brown's insistence, after hearing that producers were in talks with Brown's ex Jasmine Sanders to join the cast, tweeting "Definitely not going to be on Love & Hip Hop LA lol". On January 10, 2014, it was reported that producers were having difficulties finalising casting, after Ray J's contractional obligations to Bad Girls All-Star Battle lead to some complications. The cast around this time reportedly included publicist-turned-rapper Hazel-E, Brooke Valentine, radio DJ Yesi Ortiz and video vixen Bria Myles. On March 31, 2014, the series began filming, with Ray, Teairra, Love, Berg, Joie, Ortiz, Ray's assistant Morgan Hardman, Omarion and his girlfriend Apryl Jones confirmed as part of the cast. On August 6, 2014, it was announced that Soulja Boy had joined the show. In interviews in 2017, Berg revealed he had filmed scenes with Joie as a couple, before Joie was fired three months into taping. Berg was then weaved into a storyline with Hazel-E, a relationship he claims was contrived for television.

On August 18, 2014, VH1 announced Love & Hip Hop: Hollywood would make its series premiere on September 15, 2014.

== Reception ==
=== Critical response ===
Love & Hip Hop: Hollywood has largely escaped the controversy and criticism that has plagued the franchise since its inception. Jon Caramanica of The New York Times called this incarnation a "great soap opera, but has little to do with modern music-making". Writer Michael Arceneaux praised the show for its portrayal of LGBT issues, and in 2018 for being the only show in the franchise to continue to provide "a ratchet good time".

=== Scripting allegations ===
Love & Hip Hop is often criticized for appearing to fabricate much of its storyline. Scott-Young has denied those claims: "I can't stress enough that the stuff they deal with on (Love & Hip Hop) is real. We may frame it within a production construct that allows us to shoot on a schedule, but we're not making up the stuff that they're going through."

=== Ratings ===
The Love & Hip Hop franchise is one of the highest-rated franchises in cable television history. In an overview of the television cultural divide, The New York Times reported that Love & Hip Hop was most popular show in the black belt.

The second series premiere garnered big ratings for the network, with VH1 announcing a combined rating of 3.6 million viewers.

=== Cultural impact ===
During a speech at a campaign rally in North Carolina on November 4, 2016, President Barack Obama referenced the show, comparing the 2016 presidential race to reality television, saying "I mean, its like some Love & Hip Hop stuff."

== Broadcast history ==
On August 10, 2015, VH1 announced that Love & Hip Hop: Hollywood would be returning for a second season on September 7, 2015.

On August 3, 2016, VH1 announced that Love & Hip Hop: Hollywood would be returning for a third season on August 15, 2016.

On April 13, 2017, VH1 announced that Love & Hip Hop: Hollywood would be returning for a fourth season on July 24, 2017.

=== Specials ===
On October 12, 2015, VH1 announced that Love & Hip Hop: Out in Hip Hop, a round-table discussion moderated by T. J. Holmes of ABC News, would air on October 19, 2015. The special focused on the reality on being openly LGBT in the hip-hop community, and coincided with the airing of the seventh episode "Truth", in which bisexual cast member Miles comes out to his ex-girlfriend Amber. The special garnered 1.5 million viewers, ranking #1 among women 18-49 in its time period.

On July 3, 2017, three weeks before the season four premiere, VH1 aired Dirty Little Secrets, a special featuring unseen footage and deleted scenes from the show's first three seasons, along with interviews with the show's cast and producers.

== Distribution ==
Love & Hip Hop: Hollywood episodes air regularly on VH1 in the United States.
