= Bump, Bump, Bump =

Single by B2K featuring P. Diddy

from the album Pandemonium!
- Released: October 23, 2002
- Recorded: 2002
- Studio: Rockland Studios; Chicago Recording Company (Chicago, Illinois); Cutting Room; Daddy's House Recording Studios (New York City, New York); Triangle Sound Studios; Tree Sound Studios (Atlanta, Georgia); Circle House Studios (Miami, Florida)
- Genre: R&B; hip hop
- Label: TUG; Epic
- Songwriters: Robert Kelly; Varick Smith
- Producer: R. Kelly

B2K singles chronology
"Why I Love You" (2002)	"Bump, Bump, Bump" (2002)	"Girlfriend" (2003)

P. Diddy singles chronology
"I Need a Girl (Part Two)" (2002)	"Bump, Bump, Bump" (2002)	"Dance with Us" (2002)

"Bump, Bump, Bump" is a song by American boy band B2K, featuring P. Diddy. It was released October 2002 as the lead single from B2K's third album Pandemonium!. It was written by R. Kelly and Varick Smith and produced by Kelly. It became B2K's first and only top 10 hit on the Billboard Hot 100 singles chart, and reached number one for one week starting on February 1, 2003.

== Formats and track listings ==
CD single

1. "Bump, Bump, Bump" (radio edit) – 3:56
2. "Bump, Bump, Bump" (Jiggy Joint radio remix) – 3:53

12" maxi

1. "Bump, Bump, Bump" (main version) – 4:47
2. "Bump, Bump, Bump" (radio edit) –
3. "Bump, Bump, Bump" (instrumental) – 4:47
4. "Bump, Bump, Bump" (a cappella) – 4:46

12" maxi – Remixes – Promo

1. "Bump, Bump, Bump" (club mix) – 6:27
2. "Bump, Bump, Bump" (bonus beats) – 3:53
3. "Bump, Bump, Bump" (radio edit) – 3:39
4. "Bump, Bump, Bump" (percapella) – 3:53

== Remixes ==
- Bump, Bump, Bump (Official Remix)
- Bump, Bump, Bump (Remix) (feat. DJ Whoo Kidd & 50 Cent)
- Bump, Bump, Bump (DJ Static Remix) (feat. Jay-Z & 50 Cent)
- Dunk, Dunk, Dunk (by Ne-Yo)

== Personnel ==
- R. Kelly – Composer, producer, vocal producer, arranger, co-mixing, background vocals
- Varick Smith – Additional composing
- Max Gousse – Vocal producer, executive producer
- Troy Taylor – Vocal producer
- Sean "P. Diddy" Combs – Guest vocals, vocal producer, mixing
- Donnie Lyle – Guitars
- Abel Garibaldi – Recording, programming
- Jason Mlodzinski – Programming assistant
- Ian Mereness, Andy Gallas, Rony Nameri, Orlando Calzado – Recording
- Rob Paustian, Robert Williams – Additional recording
- Mike Patterson – Mixing
- Chris Athens – Mastering
- Chris Stokes, David McPherson, Ketrina Askew, B2K, Platinum Status – Executive producers
- Marvin Peart – Associate executive producer
- Jiggy Joint – Remix producer

== Music video ==
The video was released in November 2002 and was directed by Chris Stokes and Erik White. It features the band and P. Diddy in colorful rooms with dancers.

== Charts ==
=== Weekly charts ===
Chart (2002–2003)	Peak position
Australia (ARIA)	4
Australian Urban (ARIA)	3
Austria (Ö3 Austria Top 40)	48
Belgium (Ultratop 50 Flanders)	8
Belgium (Ultratop 50 Wallonia)	7
Denmark (Tracklisten)	12
Europe (Eurochart Hot 100)	3
Europe (European Hit Radio)	23
France (SNEP)	7
Germany (GfK)	7
Ireland (IRMA)	25
Latvia (Latvijas Top 40)	26
Netherlands (Dutch Top 40)	10
Netherlands (Single Top 100)	8
New Zealand (Recorded Music NZ)	10
Scottish Singles Sales (Official Charts)	19
Sweden (Sverigetopplistan)	53
Switzerland (Schweizer Hitparade)	2
UK Singles (Official Charts)	11
UK Airplay (Music Week)	24
UK Hip Hop/R&B (Official Charts)	4
US Billboard Hot 100	1
US Hot R&B/Hip-Hop Songs (Billboard)	2
US Pop Airplay (Billboard)	3
US Rhythmic Airplay (Billboard)	1

=== Year-end charts ===
Chart (2003)	Position
Australia (ARIA)	25
Australia urban (ARIA)	11
Belgium (Ultratop Flanders)	48
Belgium (Ultratop Wallonia)	32
Europe (European Hit Radio)	72
France (SNEP)	52
Germany (Official German Charts)	36
Netherlands (Dutch Top 40)	85
Netherlands (Single Top 100)	93
Switzerland (Schweizer Hitparade)	24
UK Singles (Official Charts Company)	102
UK Urban (Music Week)	33
US Billboard Hot 100	22
US Hot R&B/Hip-Hop Songs (Billboard)	41

== Certifications ==
Region	Certification	Certified units/sales
Australia (ARIA)	Platinum	70,000^{^}
France (SNEP)	Gold	250,000^{*}
Germany (BVMI)	Gold	250,000^{‡}
United Kingdom (BPI)	Silver	200,000^{‡}
^{*} Sales figures based on certification alone.^{^} Shipments figures based on certification alone.^{‡} Sales+streaming figures based on certification alone.
