= B2K =

American contemporary R&B group

- Also known as: Boys of the New Millennium
- Origin: Los Angeles, California, U.S.
- Genres: R&B; pop; hip hop
- Years active: 1998–2004; 2018–2019; 2025–present
- Labels: Epic; TUG
- Members: J-Boog; Raz-B; Lil' Fizz; Omarion

B2K (Boys of the New Millennium) is an American boy band active from 1998 to 2004 and 2018 to 2019, and having re-formed again in 2025. In 1998, the group was formed by American dance choreographer Dave Scott and Interscope A&R Keshia Gamble. The members consisted of Lil' Fizz, J-Boog, Raz-B, and Omarion. The group released their self-titled debut album on March 12, 2002. The album peaked at number two on the Billboard 200 and number one on the U.S. Top R&B/Hip-Hop Albums chart. On 10 June 2025, it was reported that the group had announced a reunion tour for 2026.

== History ==
The group was originally formed in 1998, when Jarell "J-Boog" Houston, De'Mario "Raz-B" Thornton and Dreux Pierre "Lil' Fizz" Frédéric were a part of another group called Melodic. On New Year's Eve in 1999, Omari "Omarion" Grandberry was invited to join the band. Together, they would adopt the name B2K, an acronym for "Boys of the New Millennium," and a reference to the Y2K era.

In 2001, B2K released their debut single, "Uh Huh," produced by Tricky Stewart. Their self-titled debut album, which also included the singles "Gots ta Be" and "Why I Love You", was released in March 2002 and peaked at No. 2 on the Billboard 200 chart, later being certified Gold. Their second album, a Christmas album entitled Santa Hooked Me Up, was less successful upon its release in October, peaking at No. 132 on the Billboard 200, but their third and final album Pandemonium!, released two months later, debuted at No. 10 on the Billboard 200. The lead single from Pandemonium!, a collaboration with P. Diddy entitled "Bump, Bump, Bump", reached No. 1 on the Hot 100, becoming the group's sole number one song.

In 2003, the group won a Kids' Choice Award for Favorite Singing Group. That same year, all of the members filmed the movie You Got Served. In 2004, around the time the movie was released, B2K's manager Chris Stokes announced the group's split, with their label Epic Records claiming internal disagreements as the cause. Lil' Fizz, Raz-B, and J-Boog issued a joint statement confirming the end of their professional relationship with Stokes. The trio also said they "just want[ed] to be treated fairly". Omarion would remain under Stokes' management and pursue a solo career.

=== 2005–2018: Solo ventures, Love & Hip Hop ===
Omarion went on to release several solo albums, as well as a collaboration album with Bow Wow. From 2005 to 2007, Lil' Fizz guest-starred on Fox's comedy series The War at Home which aired for two seasons. After much controversy, Raz-B relocated overseas to China in pursuit of a solo career, as well as becoming an entrepreneur and manager of his own record label. In 2009, J-Boog collaborated with Lil' Fizz on the 5-Track EP album "Nightlife". He also partnered with IMx member and relative Marques Houston, becoming a writer, producer and vice president for Houston's film production company, Footage Films.

In 2014, Omarion and Fizz became main cast members of VH1's reality show Love & Hip Hop: Hollywood, where both members showcased their private lives and relationships. Omarion left after two seasons to focus on his personal life with his then girlfriend and newborn child, while Fizz remained as supporting cast for the remainder of the seasons. During the series in 2017, J-Boog made an appearance as Fizz attempted to get the band back together with Omarion not being present and possibly having co-star and long time friend Ray J be a part of the group as a replacement. Ultimately, Ray J's ego caused tension between him and J-Boog, which resulted in Fizz and Boog deciding it was best to just let the group rest in their history and reunite the right way.

=== 2018–2020: The Millennium Tour Reunion ===
On December 31, 2018, it was announced by group managers Michelle Le Fleur and Damuer H. Leffridge that after 15 years, B2K would reunite for The Millennium Tour in 2019. The 3-month city tour occurred during March, April and May 2019. The location and dates were released through the G-Squared Events website. The tour featured all four members of B2K, as well as several other mid-2000s urban artists, including Pretty Ricky, Chingy, Ying Yang Twins, Mario, Bobby V and Lloyd. During the NYC show at Madison Square Garden, Ashanti made a brief surprise appearance performing with Lloyd on their hit single "Southside".

==== Raz-B's various incidents during the tour ====
During the 3-month Millennium Tour, Raz-B was involved in multiple incidents, which were set to be documented as he officially joined the cast of VH1's Love & Hip Hop: Hollywood, and agreed to chronicle his life experiences while on tour. This never came to fruition as the reality show was postponed indefinitely due to the COVID-19 pandemic in 2020.

- During the first few weeks of the tour, Raz-B reported to Instagram, explaining on video that he may recuse himself from the tour due to feeling uncomfortable and unsafe after allegations former manager Chris Stokes was possibly in the presence of the group while on tour. Hours later, the group made a statement that Raz-B would remain on tour, disclosing they were in support of their bandmate's mental well-being.
- During the Nashville, Tennessee tour stop, Raz-B walked off stage mid performance. He took to Instagram and posted "It really sucks, this being my dream tour. It’s not right! I’m the spirit of the group! I’m clearly alone in this, Omarion thanks for showing me love when nobody else would. I suggest nobody talk to me! Cause none of y'all understand what I'm going through!" He then mentioned his dislike for their performance set opening sequence introduction: "Change the f---ing intro, I hate it!"
- In late April, Raz-B was arrested in Minneapolis after reports of domestic violence with his actress girlfriend. It was alleged that he physically strangled and choked her outside of a Macy's store. However, the County Attorney's Office decided not to prosecute him due to the lack of evidence provided. The producers and camera crew of Love & Hip Hop were not present during this event.
- In early May, during a 27-minute Lyft ride in Jacksonville, Florida, Raz-B slept through the ride and was half awake exiting the vehicle, leaving his $2,500 Louis Vuitton bag. He contacted the driver and said that he hung up on him, which resulted in Raz-B making claims that the driver would not give it back. However, the driver did in fact return the bag by dropping it off at a secure location.
- On May 10, 2019, B2K announced that Raz-B was taking a break from the tour to cater more to his health and well-being, and would not appear for the remainder of the tour. The group was also said to be in support of him receiving self care and hoped to see his return later.

=== 2021–present: Brief feud and occasional appearances ===
In 2021, Omarion did an interview with the New York Post, addressing issues with his bandmates. He stated that he had "matured" and that within the group, there was "a lack of communication" and "lack of knowledge".

On June 23, 2022, Omarion performed a Verzuz where he insinuated his former bandmates were "glorified backup dancers", prompting J-Boog to negatively respond. Shortly after, Omarion announced the arrival of his five-part docuseries titled Omega: The Gift & The Curse, where he finally addressed issues including the 2019 Millennium Tour, the group's downfall, and Lil' Fizz's relationship with the mother of his children.

On September 3, 2022, J-Boog, Raz B and Lil' Fizz appeared on the Revolt series Drink Champs as a trio to discuss their side of the turmoil.

On July 31, 2024, B2K reunited on stage at a concert held by Jhené Aiko in Los Angeles, California, seemingly ending their feud.

== Members ==
- Omarion – lead singer
- J-Boog – vocals
- Raz-B – vocals
- Lil' Fizz – rapper

== Discography ==
Studio albums

- B2K (2002)
- Santa Hooked Me Up (2002)
- Pandemonium! (2003)
- Eclipse (2026)

== Filmography ==
- 2004: You Got Served

== Tours ==
- Scream Tour I (2001)
- Scream Tour II (2002)
- Scream Tour III (2003)
- The Millennium Tour (2019)
- Boys 4 Life Tour (2026)

== Awards ==
BET Awards

Year	Nominee / work	Award	Result
2002	"Uh Huh"	Viewer's Choice Award	Won
2002	B2K	Best New Artist	Nominated
2002	B2K	Best Group	Nominated
2003	"Girlfriend"	Video of the Year	Nominated
2003	"Bump, Bump, Bump"	Viewer's Choice Award	Won
2003	B2K	Best Group	Won

Nickelodeon Kids' Choice Awards

Year	Nominee / work	Award	Result
2003	B2K	Favorite Music Group	Won
2004	B2K	Favorite Music Group	Nominated
2004	"Bump, Bump, Bump"	Favorite Song	Nominated

Soul Train Music Awards

Year	Nominee / work	Award	Result
2003	B2K	Best R&B/Soul Album – Group, Band or Duo	Won
2003	"Bump, Bump, Bump"	Best R&B/Soul Single – Group, Band or Duo	Won
2004	Pandemonium!	Best R&B/Soul Album – Group, Band or Duo	Won
2004	"Girlfriend"	Best R&B/Soul Single – Group, Band or Duo	Nominated

Nickelodeon Australian Kids Choice Awards

Year	Nominee / work	Award	Result
Nickelodeon Australian Kids' Choice Awards 2005	B2K	Favourite Music Group	Nominated
