= O-Town discography =

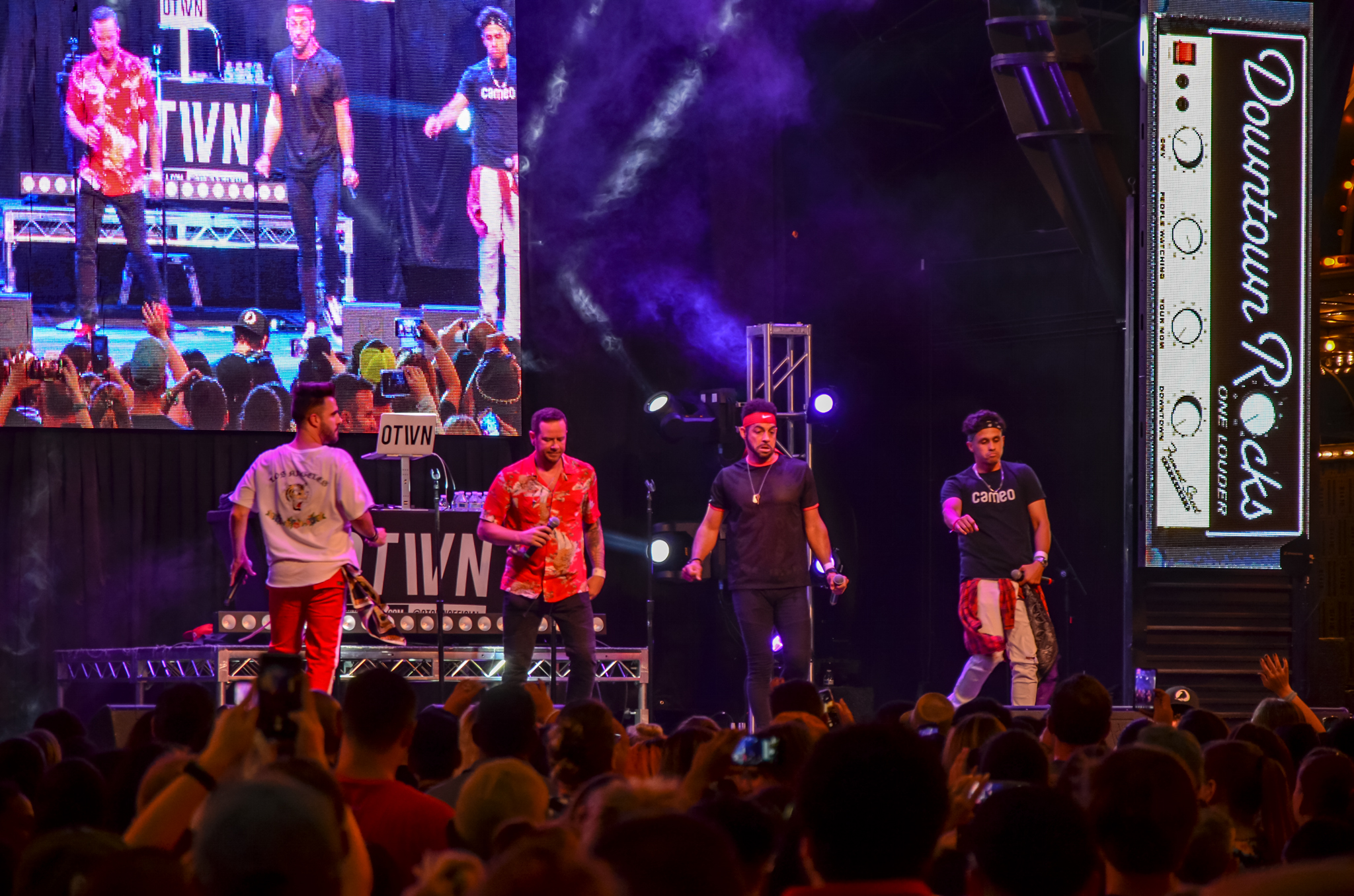
- O-Town performing at the POP 2000 Tour in 2019.
- Studio albums: 4
- EPs: 1
- Singles: 10

The discography of American boy band O-Town consists of four studio albums, an EP and ten singles. Their debut studio album, O-Town, was released on January 23, 2001, and peaked at number five on the US Billboard 200. It also charted in the top 50 of seven other countries and certified platinum in the US and Canada.

== Albums ==
List of albums, with selected chart positions and certifications
Title	Album details	Peak chart positions								Certifications
Title	Album details	US	AUT	CAN	GER	IRE	NL	SWI	UK	Certifications
O-Town	Released: January 23, 2001; Label: J; Formats: CD, cassette	5	22	2	14	34	37	50	7	CAN: Platinum; UK: Silver; US: Platinum
O2	Released: November 11, 2002; Label: J; Formats: CD, digital download	28	64	38	14	—	—	—	—	
Lines & Circles	Released: August 25, 2014; Label: All About The Melody; Formats: CD, digital download	—	—	—	—	—	—	—	—	
The O.T.W.N. Album	Released: August 2, 2019; Label: Pacific / O-Face; Formats: CD, digital download	—	—	—	—	—	—	—	—	
"—" denotes a title that did not chart, or was not released in that territory.

== EPs ==
List of extended plays, with selected details
Title	Extended play details
Part 1	Released: August 4, 2017; Label: Pacific Records / O-Face; Formats: CD, digital download

== Singles ==
List of singles, with selected chart positions and certifications, showing year released and album name
Year	Title	Peak chart positions										Certification	Album
Year	Title	US	US Pop	AUT	CAN	GER	IRE	NL	NZ	SWI	UK	Certification	Album
2000	"Liquid Dreams"	10	25	—	1	44	13	—	41	71	3	US: Gold	O-Town
2001	"All or Nothing"	3	1	5	5	10	4	18	25	9	4		O-Town
2001	"We Fit Together"	— (Note: "We Fit Together" did not enter the Billboard Hot 100, but peaked at number 4 on the Bubbling Under Hot 100 chart.)	25	50	—	39	27	—	—	95	20		O-Town
2001	"Love Should Be a Crime"	—	—	72	—	32	47	—	—	—	38		O-Town
2002	"These Are the Days"	64	16	—	20	29	—	66	—	61	36		O2
2003	"I Showed Her"	—	—	—	—	—	—	—	—	—	—		O2
2014	"Skydive"	—	—	—	—	—	—	—	—	—	—		Lines & Circles
2014	"Chasin' After You"	—	—	—	—	—	—	—	—	—	—		Lines & Circles
2017	"Empty Space"	—	—	—	—	—	—	—	—	—	—		Part 1
2019	"Hello World (feat. Colton Underwood)"	—	—	—	—	—	—	—	—	—	—		The O.T.W.N. Album
2026	"Certified Delulu"	—	—	—	—	—	—	—	—	—	—		Non-album Single
"—" denotes single that did not chart or was not released in that territory.
