= These Are the Days (O-Town song) =

2001 single by O-Town

Single by O-Town

from the album O2
- Released: September 30, 2002
- Length: 4:24
- Label: J
- Songwriters: David Frank; Steve Kipner; Wayne Hector
- Producers: David Frank; Steve Kipner

O-Town singles chronology
| "Love Should Be a Crime" (2001) | "These Are the Days" (2002) | "I Showed Her" (2003) |

"These Are the Days" is a song by American boy band O-Town. It was written by David Frank, Steve Kipner, and Wayne Hector, and produced by Frank and Kipner for their second studio album, O2 (2002). The song was released as the album's lead single and became a top-20 hit in Canada.

== Background ==
"These Are the Days" was written by David Frank, Steve Kipner, and Wayne Hector, and produced by Frank and Kipner for O-Town second studio album O2. In April 2002, MTV News reported that "I Showed Her" was initially planned to be released as the album's lead single.

== Music video ==
A music video for the song was directed by Marc Webb.

== Track listing ==
CD maxi single
| No. | Title | Writer(s) | Producer(s) | Length |
|---|---|---|---|---|
| 1. | "These Are the Days" | David Frank; Steve Kipner; Wayne Hector | Frank; Kipner | 4:24 |
| 2. | "American Game (Live)" | Jacob Underwood; Dan Miller; Billy Chapman | Dana Cornock; Underwood^{[a]} | 3:59 |
| 3. | "Girl Like That" | Ali Theodore; Ashley Parker Angel; Miller; Michael Sandlofer; Rich Cronin; Trevor Penick; Vinni Alfieri | Theodore; Alfieri; Danziger^{[a]} | 3:04 |
| 4. | "These Are the Days" (music video) | | | 3:54 |

Notes

- ^{^[a]} signifies a co-producer

== Personnel ==
Personnel are adapted from the liner notes of O2.

- Tom Coyne – mastering engineer
- Terence Eliot – guitar
- Erik Michael Estrada – vocals
- David Frank – instruments, production, writing
- Ryan Freeland – engineering
- Steve Kipner – production, writing
- Wayne Hector – writing
- Dan Miller – vocals
- Ashley Parker Angel – vocals
- Trevor Penick – vocals
- Paul Pesco – guitar
- Jacob Underwood – vocals

== Charts ==
Weekly chart performance for "These Are the Days"
| Chart (2002–2003) | Peak position |
|---|---|
| Canada (Nielsen SoundScan) | 20 |
| Germany (GfK) | 39 |
| Netherlands (Dutch Top 40 Tipparade) | 11 |
| Netherlands (Single Top 100) | 66 |
| Scottish Singles Sales (Official Charts) | 22 |
| Switzerland (Schweizer Hitparade) | 61 |
| UK Singles (Official Charts) | 36 |
| US Billboard Hot 100 | 64 |

== Release history ==
Release history for "These Are the Days"
| Region | Date | Format | Label | Ref |
|---|---|---|---|---|
| United States | September 30, 2002 | Contemporary hit radio | J Records | |
| Denmark | November 18, 2002 | CD single | J Records | |
| Europe | November 18, 2002 | CD single | J Records | |
