= Soundtrack to Your Life =

Soundtrack to Your Life can refer to:

- Soundtrack to Your Life (album), 2006 album by Ashley Parker Angel
- Soundtrack to Your Life (song), 2006 single by Ashley Parker Angel
