= Part 1 =

Part One, Part 1 or Part I may refer to:

== Music ==
- Part 1 (EP), a 2016 EP by Guy Sebastian
- Part 1 (O-Town EP), a 2017 EP by O-Town
- Part I: John Shade, Your Fortune's Made, a 2009 album by Fol Chen
- Part One (album)

== Television ==
- "Part 1" (True Detective), an episode of True Detective
- "Part 1" (Twin Peaks), the first episode of the third season of the TV series Twin Peaks
- "Part I" (Lawmen: Bass Reeves), an episode of Lawmen: Bass Reeves
- "Part I" (Obi-Wan Kenobi), an episode of Obi-Wan Kenobi
- "Part One" (Lego Star Wars: Rebuild the Galaxy), an episode of Lego Star Wars: Rebuild the Galaxy
- "Part One" (The Pacific), an episode of The Pacific
- "Part One" (Your Honor), an episode of Your Honor
- "Part One: Master and Apprentice", an episode of Ahsoka

== Other uses ==
- Part I of the Albanian Constitution
- Part I of the Constitution of India, establishing India as a federal state
- PART1, also known as Prostate androgen-regulated transcript 1, a long non-coding RNA
- Internal Revenue Code Part I

== See also ==
- PT1 (disambiguation)
