= Liquid Dreams =

Liquid Dreams may refer to:

- Liquid Dreams (film), 1991 American film
- "Liquid Dreams" (song), 2000 O-Town song
