= Tiffany Lynn Rowe =

American model and actress

- Born: May 29, 1979 (age 45); Baltimore, Maryland
- Other names: Tiffany Lynn
- Occupation(s): Model, actress
- Years active: 2004–present
- Children: 2

Tiffany Lynn Rowe (born May 29, 1979 in Baltimore, Maryland), also known professionally as Tiffany Lynn, is an American model and actress, initially best known as the partner and later fiancée of singer-songwriter Ashley Parker Angel in the reality series There and Back.

== Career ==
=== Modeling ===
Rowe began her modeling career at the age of 15 and modeled in the United States, Mexico, England, Italy, Germany, and South Africa, among other countries. She was employed by Storm Model Management in Europe and later Elite Model Agency when in Los Angeles.

=== Music videos, television and film ===
Rowe commenced her acting career in music videos, including videos for "Just So You Know" (American Head Charge, 2001), "I Miss You" (Blink 182, 2003), "Come Undone" (Robbie Williams, 2003) and "Do It Well" (Jennifer Lopez, 2007). She has also appeared in the music videos of such other artists as Lisa Stansfield and Barry White.

In 2006, she appeared with Ashley Parker Angel in the MTV reality series, There and Back which was tracking Angel in his pursuit of solo stardom. During the series, Rowe was pregnant; the birth of their son was part of the reality show.

Her professional film debut was a supporting role in the 2009 film, Waking Madison, written and directed by Katherine Brooks, and co-starring Sarah Roemer, Elisabeth Shue, Will Patton and Taryn Manning.

== Personal life ==
Rowe was engaged to singer/actor Ashley Parker Angel. The couple broke up in 2008, after a five-year relationship. In 2005, Lynn gave birth to their son, Lyric Lennon Parker-Angel. Lyric is an actor who plays Lachlan Drake on American Horror Story: Hotel.
