= Soundtrack to Your Life (song) =

Single by Ashley Parker Angel

from the album Soundtrack to Your Life
- Released: 2006
- Genre: Pop rock
- Length: 3:13
- Label: Blackground/Universal
- Songwriter(s): A. Angel, L. Christy, G. Edwards, S. Spock
- Producer(s): The Matrix

Ashley Parker Angel singles chronology
"Let U Go" (2006)	"Soundtrack to Your Life" (2006)

"Soundtrack to Your Life" is a pop rock song by singer Ashley Parker Angel. The song was released in 2006 and is featured on his 2006 debut album Soundtrack to Your Life.

"Soundtrack to Your Life" was first heard as the theme song to Angel's reality show There and Back, which chronicled Angel's return to the music world. The song was produced by The Matrix, whose other clients have included Britney Spears, Skye Sweetnam, Avril Lavigne, Hilary Duff and Busted. The song is played only to the chorus. The song is a message to his son. The lyrics are about life in general.

== Charts ==
Chart (2006)	Peak position
U.S. Billboard Hot 100	58
