= All or Nothing (O-Town song) =

2001 single by O-Town

Single by O-Town

from the album O-Town
- Released: March 20, 2001
- Length: 4:41 (album version); 4:12 (radio edit)
- Label: J
- Songwriters: Steve Mac; Wayne Hector
- Producer: Steve Mac

O-Town singles chronology
"Liquid Dreams" (2000)	"All or Nothing" (2001)	"We Fit Together" (2001)

Music video
- "All or Nothing" on YouTube

"All or Nothing" is a song by American boy band O-Town. The track was written by Wayne Hector and Steve Mac, and produced by Mac. It was released on March 20, 2001, as the second single from their debut album, O-Town (2001). The song reached number three in the United States, number five in Canada, and number four in the United Kingdom.

In 2006, Irish boy band Westlife recorded a cover version on their seventh studio album, The Love Album—to which was used extensively as background music during the audition stages of The X Factor UK. The song itself charted without being properly released as a single in the United Kingdom. Westlife later revealed that the song was first offered to them but Simon Cowell, their executive producer, rejected it and passed it on to O-Town, becoming their hit. Rolling Stone ranked the song as the 32nd-best boy band song of all time.

== Composition ==
The song is performed in the key of C major in common time with a tempo of 64 beats per minute then modulates to D major after the bridge. The group's vocals span from G_{3} to A_{4}.

== Track listings ==
UK CD1

1. "All or Nothing" (Radio Mix)
2. "All or Nothing" (Rizzo Radio Edit)

UK CD2

1. "All or Nothing" (Radio Mix)
2. "All or Nothing" (HQ2 Radio Mix)
3. "Liquid Dreams" (Matrix Mix)
4. "All or Nothing" (Music Video)

Europe CD-maxi

1. "All or Nothing" (Radio Mix)
2. "All or Nothing" (Rizzo Club Mix)
3. "All or Nothing" (HQ2 Mixshow Mix)
4. "Take Me Under" (Live Version)
5. "Baby I Would"

US CD single

1. "All or Nothing" (Radio Mix)
2. "All or Nothing" (HQ2 Radio Mix)
3. "All or Nothing" (Rizzo Radio Edit)
4. "Liquid Dreams" (HQ2 Radio Mix)
5. "Take Me Under" (Live Version)
6. "We Fit Together"

US 7-inch vinyl

1. "All or Nothing" (Radio Edit) — 4:08
2. "All or Nothing" (Mike Rizzo Radio Mix) — 3:51

== Personnel ==
Personnel are adapted from the liner notes of O-Town.

- Erik-Michael Estrada – vocals
- Paul Gendler – guitars
- Matthew Howes – engineering
- Chris Laws – drums, percussion
- Steve Mac – arrangement, engineering, keyboards, production, writing
- Dan Miller – vocals
- Richard Niles – string arrangement
- Ashley Parker Angel – vocals
- Steve Pearce – bass
- Trevor Penick – vocals
- Daniel Pursey – engineering
- Jacob Underwood – vocals

== Charts ==
=== Weekly charts ===
Weekly chart performance for "All or Nothing"
Chart (2001–2002)	Peak position
Austria (Ö3 Austria Top 40)	5
Canada (Nielsen SoundScan)	5
Croatia (HRT)	10
Europe (Eurochart Hot 100)	16
Germany (GfK)	10
Ireland (IRMA)	4
Netherlands (Dutch Top 40)	18
Netherlands (Single Top 100)	18
Netherlands Airplay (Music & Media)	22
New Zealand (Recorded Music NZ)	25
Scottish Singles Sales (Official Charts)	5
Switzerland (Schweizer Hitparade)	9
UK Singles (Official Charts)	4
US Billboard Hot 100	3
US Adult Contemporary (Billboard)	4
US Adult Pop Airplay (Billboard)	40
US Dance Singles Sales (Billboard) Remixes	1
US Pop Airplay (Billboard)	1
US Rhythmic Airplay (Billboard)	29

=== Year-end charts ===
2001 year-end chart performance for "All or Nothing"
Chart (2001)	Position
Canada (Nielsen SoundScan)	51
Canada Radio (Nielsen BDS)	38
Germany (Media Control)	75
Ireland (IRMA)	51
Switzerland (Schweizer Hitparade)	71
UK Singles (OCC)	102
US Billboard Hot 100	41
US Adult Contemporary (Billboard)	25
US Maxi-Singles Sales (Billboard)	2
US Mainstream Top 40 (Billboard)	17

2002 year-end chart performance for "All or Nothing"
Chart (2002)	Position
Netherlands (Single Top 100)	100
US Adult Contemporary (Billboard)	22

== Release history ==
Release dates and formats for "All or Nothing"
Region	Date	Format(s)	Label(s)	Ref.
United States	March 20, 2001	Contemporary hit radio	J	
United States	June 4, 2001	Adult contemporary radio	J	
United States	July 10, 2001	Maxi-CD	J	
United Kingdom	July 23, 2001	CD	J; BMG	
