= PTI =

PTI may refer to:

== Arts and entertainment ==
- Pardon the Interruption, an American television sports show
- PTI, a musical group on the WTII Records label

== Organizations ==
- Pakistan Tehreek-e-Insaf, a Pakistani political party founded in 1996 by Imran Khan
- Partai Tionghoa Indonesia (Chinese Indonesian Party), a political party in the Dutch East Indies
- Pennsylvania Transportation Institute, a research unit of Pennsylvania State University's College of Engineering
- Philippine Tobacco Institute, a Philippine trade association
- Piedmont Triad International Airport, an American airport
- Pittsburgh Technical Institute, an American two-year technical college
- Portugal Telecom International, a division of Portugal Telecom, a Portuguese telecommunications service provider
- Post-Tensioning Institute, an American non-profit trade organization
- Powertech Technology Inc., Taiwanese semiconductor assembler
- Premier Travel Inn, the former name of the British hotel chain Premier Inn
- Press Trust of India, an Indian news agency, headquartered in Delhi
- Public Technical Identifiers, the corporation responsible for maintaining the Internet's unique identifiers on behalf of ICANN as a successor to the Internet Assigned Numbers Authority

== Science and technology ==
- Page-table isolation, a Linux kernel feature that mitigates the Meltdown security vulnerability
- Palomar Testbed Interferometer, a long-baseline interferometer at the American Palomar Observatory in San Diego County, California, US
- PAMP-triggered immunity, an immunity response to pathogen-associated molecular pattern (PAMPs) microbial epitopes in plants
- Periodical technical inspection of vehicles
- Proof Tracking Index, used to measure the electrical breakdown (tracking) properties of an insulating material
- Ti plasmid (pTi), a circular plasmid used in creation of transgenic plants

== Other uses ==
- Parent-teacher interview, a short conference between students' parents and teachers
- Physical training instructor, an instructor in physical fitness
- Pretrial Intervention Program, a program for first-time offenders in New Jersey, US
- Produce Traceability Initiative, a program to track produce through the supply chain

== See also ==
- PT1 (disambiguation)
