= Pizza Man (2011 film) =

- Directed by: Joe Eckardt
- Written by: Jonathan Kapoor; Marco Mannone
- Starring: Frankie Muniz; Shelley Long; Diamond Dallas Page; Corbin Bernsen; "Rowdy" Roddy Piper; Adam West; Stan Lee
- Production companies: Rock On! Films; JNK Entertainment
- Distributed by: Anchor Bay Entertainment
- Release date: June 15, 2011 (DVD)
- Running time: 90 minutes
- Country: United States
- Language: English
- Budget: $3 million

Pizza Man is a 2011 American superhero comedy film directed by Joe Eckardt, written by Jonathan Kapoor and Marco Mannone, and starring Frankie Muniz and Diamond Dallas Page.

== Plot ==
The film revolves around Matt Burns, a dorky pizza delivery boy who is forced to ingest a genetically-engineered tomato that was designed to create super soldiers. Matt soon stumbles into a hostile corporate takeover and he must use his new-found powers to save himself, the world, and the girl of his dreams. Matt quickly learns that he can no longer be a pizza boy, and must become a hero, the PIZZA MAN.

== Cast ==
- Frankie Muniz as Matt Burns / Pizza Man
- Dallas Page as John Kryder / The Big Cheese
- Amber Borycki as Susan
- Shelley Long as Mrs. Burns
- David H. Lawrence XVII as Detective Moser
- Corbin Bernsen as Criswell
- Michael Gross as Professor Tucker
- Terry Rhoads as Professor Marsley
- Ashley Parker Angel as Todd
- Anthony Denison as Government Investor
- Leonard Roberts as Leo
- Adam West as Himself
- Roddy Piper as Himself
- Stan Lee as Himself
