= O2 (O-Town album) =

Studio album by O-Town
- Released: November 11, 2002
- Recorded: 2001–2002
- Genre: Pop
- Length: 45:55
- Label: J
- Producers: Vinni Alfieri; Shep Crawford; Rich Cronin; Zach Danziger; Jay E; Clif Magness; David Frank; Steve Kipner; Nelly; Bradley Spalter; Ali Theodore; The Underdogs; Matthew Wilder; Jamie Houston

O-Town chronology
O-Town (2001)	O2 (2002)	Lines & Circles (2014)

Singles from O2
- 1. "These Are The Days" Released: November 26, 2002; 2. "I Showed Her" Released: March 14, 2003

O2 is the second studio album by American boy band O-Town. It was released by J Records on November 11, 2002 in the United States. O2 was O-Town's last album to feature Ashley Parker Angel as a member of the group.

== Background ==
The lead single, "These Are the Days", only reached number 64 on the US Billboard Hot 100 and failed to match the success of "Liquid Dreams" or "All or Nothing". The second single, "I Showed Her", failed to chart anywhere. However, the album showed more creative input from the band, as they co-wrote six of the songs. Despite this, they soon disbanded the following year.

== Critical reception ==
Professional ratings
Review scores
Source	Rating
MTV Asia	7/10
USA Today	1.5/4 stars

AllMusic editor found that "backed by buoyant beats and haunting melodies old, new, borrowed and blue, flavored with the usual lyrics of love and loss (many penned by members of the band), O-Town transcends the above pitfalls on an album that stands strong amidst the boy-band world." Lennat Mak from MTV Asia regarded 02 as a highly likeable pop album that demonstrated O-Town's growth and willingness to experiment beyond their boy-band roots. While she praised the creative efforts on the album, she criticized certain ballads, particularly "I Showed Her," as formulaic and less effective than stronger songs like "You Can’t Lose Me." Overall, she concluded that despite some flaws, 02 was an enjoyable, authentic pop record that avoided feeling contrived or overproduced. USA Today critic Elya Gardner wrote that O2 was filled with "insipid pop dilettantism" and failed to convince in its attempts at various styles, with songs like "From the Damage" and "These Are the Days" being "so overwrought they would make Jon Bon Jovi squirm." She found that the group struggled to prove their creative integrity while aping obvious rock and R&B clichés.

== Commercial performance ==
O2 debuted and peaked at number 28 on the US Billboard 200, selling over 52,000 copies. It eventually sold over 257,000 copies in the United States and over half a million worldwide. Elsewhere, the album entered the top 20 of the German Albums Chart, reaching number 14.

== Track listing ==
International standard edition
No.	Title	Writer(s)	Producer(s)	Length
1.	"From the Damage"	Ashley Parker Angel; Clif Magness; Steve Kipner	Magness; Kipner	3:50
2.	"These Are the Days"	David Frank; Kipner; Wayne Hector	Frank; Kipner	4:24
3.	"I Only Dance with You"	Alex Cantrall; Andrew Ridgeley; Bradley Spalter; David Lindsey; George Michael; Philip White	The Underdogs	3:26
4.	"Favorite Girl"	Cornell Haynes, Jr.	Nelly; Jason Epperson^{[a]}	4:05
5.	"I Showed Her"	Shep Crawford	Crawford	4:12
6.	"Been Around the World"	Adam Kagan; Bradley Spalter; Leah Hayworth	Spalter	2:51
7.	"Make Her Say"	Ali Theodore; Bernard McDonald; Craig Derry; Doug Wimbish; Dwain Mitchell; Ed Fletcher; Erik Michael Estrada; Master P; Mia Young; Richard Anthony Jones, Jr.; Rich Cronin; Vinni Alfieri; Sylvia Robinson; Vyshonne Miller	Theodore; Alfieri; Estrada^{[b]}; Cronin^{[b]}; Zach Danziger^{[b]}	3:20
8.	"The Joint"	Scharyj; Cantrall; Spalter; Estrada; George Scharyj	Spalter	3:15
9.	"Suddenly"	Parker Angel; Billy Chapin; Cronin	Matthew Wilder	3:48
10.	"Craving"	Parker Angel; Magness; Pam Sheyne	Magness	3:25
11.	"Over Easy"	Jamie Houston	Houston	3:33
12.	"Girl Like That"	Theodore; Parker Angel; Dan Miller; Michael Sandlofer; Cronin; Trevor Penick; Alfieri	Theodore; Alfieri; Danziger^{[b]}	3:04
13.	"You Can't Lose Me"	Diane Warren	Wilder	3:42

Japanese bonus tracks
No.	Title	Writer(s)	Producer(s)	Length
14.	"We Fit Together"	Mich Hansen; Joe Belmaati; Remee	Cutfather & Joe	3:53

Notes

- ^{^[a]} signifies a vocal producer
- ^{^[b]} signifies an associate vocal producer

Sample credits

- "I Only Dance with You" contains elements of "Careless Whisper" as written by George Michael and Andrew Ridgeley.
- "Make Her Say" contains re-sung elements from the composition "Make 'Em Say Uhh!" as performed by Master P along with Fiend, Silkk the Shocker, Mia X and Mystikal.

== Charts ==
Weekly chart performance for O2
Chart (2002–03)	Peak position
Austrian Albums (Ö3 Austria)	64
Canadian Albums (Nielsen SoundScan)	38
German Albums (Offizielle Top 100)	14
US Billboard 200	28
