= Terry Rhoads =

American actor (1951–2013)

- Born: December 31, 1951; Tucson, Arizona, U.S.
- Died: October 11, 2013 (aged 61); Los Angeles, California, U.S.
- Occupation: Actor
- Years active: 1987–2012
- Spouse: Lise Simms (until 2013; his death)
- Children: 2

Terry Rhoads (December 31, 1951 – October 11, 2013) was an American television actor. In 1998, he played the leading role in the short-lived situation comedy Living in Captivity.

== Career ==
During his career Rhoads usually played supporting characters on television.

== Death ==
Rhoads died of amyloidosis on October 11, 2013, at the age of 61, in Los Angeles, California.

== Filmography ==
=== Films ===
Year	Film	Role(s)	Director	Notes
1997	Liar Liar	Co-Pilot	Tom Shadyac	
1997	Midnight in the Garden of Good and Evil	Assistant D.A.	Clint Eastwood	
1998	Living Out Loud	Bill; Across Hall Man	Richard LaGravenese	
1999	The Omega Code	Reporter Matthews	Rob Marcarelli	
2004	The Day After Tomorrow	L.A. Anchorman	Roland Emmerich	
2005	American Gun	Ed Hogan	Aric Avelino	
2005	Death by Engagement	Vic Lord	Philip Creager	
2006	National Lampoon's TV: The Movie	Doctor; Interventionist	Sam Maccarone	
2008	Get Smart's Bruce and Lloyd: Out of Control	Maître d'	Gil Junger	Direct-to-video release
2009	Dance Flick	Audition Judge	Damien Dante Wayans	
2011	Pizza Man	Professor Marsley	Joe Eckardt	
2012	Hitchcock	Jack Russell	Sacha Gervasi	Final film role

=== Television ===
Year(s)	Title	Role(s)	Notes
1987	Prison for Children	Wardrobe	TV movie. Credited as Terry Rhoades (sic)
1991	Perry Mason: The Case of the Ruthless Reporter	Lance	TV movie
1992	Perry Mason: The Case of the Heartbroken Bride	Escort; Eddie	TV movie
1995	The Bold and the Beautiful	George	Episode #2029
1995	Liz: The Elizabeth Taylor Story	Robert Taylor	TV movie
1995	Beverly Hills, 90210	Maître d'	S6E6 "Speechless"
1995	Grace Under Fire	TV Announcer #1	S3E8 "Grace Really Under Fire"
1996	Murphy Brown	Alexander Operative	S8E20 "The Bus Stops Here"
1996	Men Behaving Badly	Owner	S1E6 "Jamie's in Love"
1996	NewsRadio	Roger	S3E10 "Christmas"
1996–1997	Ned and Stacey	Ray; Mr. Pace	S2E6 "Loganberry's Run"; S2E14 "The Skyward's the Limit"
1997	Seinfeld	Father	S8E18 "The Nap"
1997	Caroline in the City	Chauffeur	S3E1 "Caroline and the Reception"
1997	Cybill	Jeremy Ball	S4E9 "How to Get a Head in Show Business"
1997	The Parent 'Hood	Hugh Wheeler	S4E11 "Bad Rap"
1997	Jenny	Plastic Surgeon	S1E8 "A Girl's Gotta Love a Wedding"
1997	Night Stand with Dick Dietrick	Dr. Norman Denton	S2E35 "Mercy Killing"
1998	Alright Already	Jim	S1E13 "Again with the Satellite Dish"
1998	Party of Five	Assessor	S4E16 "I Give Up"
1998	7th Heaven	Kevin	S2E16 "It Takes a Village"
1998	Style & Substance	Stan	S1E7 "Office Management for Beginners"
1998	Living in Captivity	Gordon	Main role; 6 episodes
1998–2001	3rd Rock from the Sun	Bill; Salesman	S3E17 "Auto Erodicka"; S6E15 "Glengarry Glen Dick"
1999	The Norm Show	Frank	S1E6 "The New Boss"
1999	It's Like, You Know...	Interviewer	S2E2 "Enchanted April"
1999	The Drew Carey Show	Doctor	S5E10 "Drew's Stomachache"
2000	Just Shoot Me!	Dean Logan	S4E19 "Blinded by the Right"
2000	Action	Guy	S1E13 "The Last Ride of the Elephant Princess"
2000	The Trouble with Normal	Moderator	S1E9 "Speech! Speech!"
2000	Friends	Maître d'	S7E10 "The One with the Holiday Armadillo"
2000	Yes, Dear	Lawyer	S1E11 "All I Want for Christmas Is My Dead Uncle's Cash"
2001	Nikki	Frank	S1E10 "Bottoms Up"
2001	The Huntress	Larry	S1E16 "Family Therapy"
2001	Sabrina the Teenage Witch	Dick	S5E22 "Finally!"
2001	Ally McBeal	Mr. Furnwall	S5E5 "I Want Love"
2001–2002	Dharma & Greg	Kevin; Howard	S5E2 "With a Little Help from My Friend"; S5E14 "Near-Death of a Salesman"; S5E15 "It's a Bird, It's a Plane, It's... My Wife"
2001–2005	That '70s Show	Border Guard; Dr. Don	S3E22 "Canadian Road Trip"; S7E20 "Gimme Shelter"
2001–2006	Malcolm in the Middle	Sheriff Chad; Supervisor	S3E4 "Malcolm's Girlfriend"; S7E19 "Stevie in the Hospital"
2002	Hidden Hills	Shmuck Husband	S1E1 "Pilot"
2002–2003	My Wife and Kids	Dr. Mason	S3E13 "Open Your Heart"; S3E22 "Sharon's Picture"
2003	Mister Sterling	Evan Dudley	S1E10 "Sins of the Father"
2003	The Parkers	Reginald	S5E3 "A Plot of View"
2003	What I Like About You	Jay Miller	S2E4 "The Loft"
2003	Good Morning, Miami	Howie	S2E8 "Her Place or Mine?"
2004	NCIS	Captain Brent Peters	S1E12 "My Other Left Foot"
2004	Significant Others	Rick	S1E2 "A Dad, an Affair & a Blind Date"; S1E3 "Intercourse, an Official Gathering & a Big Fat Lie"
2004	Two and a Half Men	Dr. Andrew Sperlock	S1E24 "Can You Feel My Finger"
2004	Joey	Jerry	S1E11 "Joey and the Roadtrip"
2004	Center of the Universe	Dr. Foster	S1E7 "Lily's Boyfriend"
2004–2005	Phil of the Future	Mayor Da Luca	S1E17 "Neander-Phil"; S1E21 "Team Diffy"
2005	Life on a Stick	Herr Schmidt	S1E4 "The Defiant Ones"
2006	Still Standing	Dr. Holman	S4E18 "Still Bad"
2006	What About Brian	Dr. Vincent Oscar	S1E2 "Two in Twenty-Four"; S1E3 "Moving Day"
2006	House	Artie (uncredited)	S3E1 "Meaning"
2006	Desperate Housewives	Howard Keck	S3E4 "Like It Was"
2007	Andy Barker, P.I.	Tom Larivee	S1E3 "Three Days of the Chicken"
2007	Cold Case	Martin Reed	S4E24 "Stalker"
2007	Bones	Dr. Potoska	S3E5 "Mummy in the Maze"
2008	Notes from the Underbelly	Tour Bus Driver	S2E5 "Friends and Neighbors"
2008–2009	Hannah Montana	Mack	S3E1 "He Ain't a Hottie, He's My Brother"; S3E8 "Welcome to the Bungle"
2009–2010	Better Off Ted	Chet	7 episodes
2011	Better with You	Gerard	S1E21 "Better with a Bargain"
