= Let U Go (Ashley Parker Angel song) =

2006 single by Ashley Parker Angel

Single by Ashley Parker Angel

from the album Soundtrack to Your Life
- Released: February 14, 2006
- Studio: Conway (Hollywood); Westlake (Los Angeles)
- Genre: Pop punk; pop rock; power pop
- Length: 3:35
- Label: Blackground; Universal
- Songwriter(s): Ashley Parker Angel; Max Martin; Lukasz Gottwald
- Producer(s): Max Martin; Dr. Luke

Ashley Parker Angel singles chronology
"Let U Go" (2006)	"Soundtrack to Your Life" (2006)

Music video
- "Let U Go" on YouTube

"Let U Go" is a song by American musician Ashley Parker Angel from his debut studio album Soundtrack to Your Life (2006). It was released to radio as the lead single from the album on February 14, 2006, by Blackground Records and Universal Records. The song was written by Parker, Max Martin, and Lukasz "Dr. Luke" Gottwald, whilst production was helmed by Martin and Dr. Luke. The song peaked at number 12 on the Billboard Hot 100 chart, in addition to peaking at number 10 on the Pop 100 chart.

== Critical reception ==
Chuck Taylor of Billboard referred to the song as a "wheely-squealing pop/rock headbanger" that "fits well within the 'TRL' template for uptempo pubescent pop."

== Music video ==
This music video takes place in two places. In the beginning it seems Ashley and his band are in a basement. He begins to play the song and the walls begin to shake. After that the walls fall and the band ends up in a club with screaming fans all around. He moves to a secluded area and the music stops. It begins again as a strobe light begins to flash. The song starts to end and the club changes to the front of a theater which says "Ashley Parker Angel, One Night Only". The song ends and Ashley throws his guitar over his shoulder and walks away. It premiered on TRL on March 14, 2006 and went to number one soon after.

== Credits and personnel ==
Credits and personnel are adapted from the Soundtrack to Your Life album liner notes.

- Ashley Parker Angel – writer, vocals
- Max Martin – writer, producer, all instruments except drums
- Lukasz "Dr. Luke" Gottwald – writer, producer, all instruments except drums
- Seth Waldmann – recording
- Ross Hogarth – recording, engineering
- Rob Kinelski – recording, engineering
- Randy Staub – mixing
- Dorian Crozier – drums
- Mike Fasano – drum tech
- Bob Ludwig – mastering

== Charts ==
Chart (2006)	Peak position
US Billboard Hot 100	12
US Billboard Pop Songs	24
US Billboard Pop 100	9

== Release history ==
Region	Date	Format	Label(s)	Ref.
United States	February 14, 2006	Contemporary hit radio	Blackground; Universal	
