= We Fit Together =

2001 single by O-Town

Single by O-Town

from the album Dr. Dolittle 2 soundtrack and O-Town
- Released: September 4, 2001
- Length: 3:56
- Label: J
- Songwriters: Mich Hansen; Joe Belmaati; Remee
- Producers: Cutfather & Joe

O-Town singles chronology
"All or Nothing" (2001)	"We Fit Together" (2001)	"Love Should Be a Crime" (2001)

Music video
- "We Fit Together" on YouTube

"We Fit Together" is a song by American boy band O-Town. It produced by Cutfather & Joe and written by Mich Hansen, Joe Belmaati, and Remee. It was released on the soundtrack to the film Dr. Dolittle 2 in June 2001 and appears in the film. In September 2001, it was released as the third single off their self-titled debut album (2001). The song failed to chart on the US Billboard Hot 100 but managed to peak at number 25 on the Mainstream Top 40 chart. It fared better in Europe, reaching the top 40 in Germany, Ireland, and the United Kingdom.

== Background ==
"We Fit Together" was written by Joe Belmaati, Mich Hansen, and Remee, while production on the track was helmed by Bemlaati and Hansen under their production moniker Cutfather & Joe. Recorded in "a tiny studio in Hong Kong" while promoting their self-titled debut album, the song initially appeared on the soundtrack to the fantasy comedy film Dr. Dolittle 2 (2001) and was later included on the band's self-titled debut album after being selected as their third single. On their decision to release the song as a single, band member Jacob Underwood commented in an interview with MTV News: "We just wanted it to be something fun. "All or Nothing" was a very serious big-time ballad. We wanted to go to the opposite [end] of the spectrum – something fun, something for summertime that people could dance to. The lyrics weren't anything serious. It didn't tell a story."

== Music video ==
A music video for the song, directed by Marcus Raboy, depicts the band cavorting on a paradisiacal beach and on an ocean liner. The crew suffered from heavy seasickness during filming.

== Track listing ==
CD maxi single
No.	Title	Writer(s)	Producer(s)	Length
1.	"We Fit Together" (original radio edit)	Mich Hansen; Joe Belmaati; Mikkel Johan Imer Sigvardt	Cutfather & Joe	2:56
2.	"Liquid Dreams" (live version)	Quincy Patrick; Joshua Thompson; Bradley Spalter; Michael Norfleet	O-Town	3:47
3.	"All or Nothing" (live version)	Wayne Hector; Steve Mac	O-Town	5:51

== Personnel ==
Personnel adapted from the liner notes of O-Town.

- Joe Belmaati – guitar, producer, programming, writing
- Mich Hansen – percussion, production, writing
- Mads Nilsson – recording engineer
- Remee – writing

== Charts ==
Weekly chart performance for "We Fit Together"
Chart (2001–2002)	Peak position
Austria (Ö3 Austria Top 40)	50
Europe (Eurochart Hot 100)	71
Europe (European Hit Radio)	42
Germany (GfK)	39
Ireland (IRMA)	27
Scottish Singles Sales (Official Charts)	19
Switzerland (Schweizer Hitparade)	95
UK Singles (Official Charts)	20
US Bubbling Under Hot 100 (Billboard)	4
US Pop Airplay (Billboard)	25

== Release history ==
Release history for "We Fit Together"
Region	Date	Format(s)	Label(s)	Ref.
United States	September 4, 2001	Contemporary hit radio	J	
United Kingdom	October 22, 2001	CD; cassette	J	
