= PT1 =

PT1 may refer to:

- 486958 Arrokoth (New Horizons PT1), a Kuiper belt object and selected target for a flyby of the New Horizons probe
- Pratt & Whitney PT1, a free-piston gas-turbine engine
- Consolidated PT-1 Trusty, a 1930s USAAS primary trainer airplane
- Piper PT-1, primary trainer airplane.
- PT-1, a pre-World War II US Navy PT boat
- Prison Tycoon, a 2005 video game
- PT1, a Para triathlon classification

== See also ==
- PTI (disambiguation)
- Part One (album)
