= Pratt & Whitney PT1 =

PT1
- Type: Free-piston gas turbine
- National origin: United States
- Manufacturer: Pratt & Whitney
- First run: 1943
- Status: Cancelled

The Pratt & Whitney PT1 (US military designation T32) was a free-piston gas turbine project developed in the early 1940s. The project never progressed beyond ground test units, and was cancelled in 1945 in favor of developing the PT2 (T34) turboprop. The development of the PT1 gave Pratt & Whitney engineers valuable experience in designing gas turbines that it would later apply to projects that resulted in the Pratt & Whitney JT3 turbojet engine.

== See also ==
Related lists

- List of aircraft engines
