= There & Back (TV series) =

2006 reality TV series

- Also known as: There & Back: Ashley Parker Angel
- Created by: Rod Aissa
- Starring: Ashley Parker Angel
- Country of origin: United States
- No. of seasons: 1
- No. of episodes: 10

Production
- Running time: 24 minutes

Original release
- Network: MTV
- Release: January 9 – March 13, 2006

There & Back: Ashley Parker Angel is a MTV reality television series which ran for ten weeks in early 2006. It chronicled the efforts of former O-Town member Ashley Parker Angel to launch a solo career while providing for his new family. In the show, Ashley must manage his career while also having to provide for his fiancée, Tiffany Lynn, and his new son, Lyric (whose birth was the first shown on MTV). The show debuted on January 9, 2006, and ended on March 13, 2006.

== Episodes ==
No.	Title	Original release date
1	"Ashley's Back"	January 9, 2006
Who can forget the blond, spike-haired Ashley from the platinum-selling group, O-Town? Well, now things have changed. O-Town is over, and Ashley's back as a solo artist. But Ashley is broke, living with his pregnant girlfriend and her mother in a small apartment. Added to Ashley's frustration are feelings that his album producers are holding back on his money advance. Ashley's manager tells him his songs are good but not great. Ashley and former O-Town member, Jacob Underwood, reminisce about their stardom. Later, while going over baby names with Tiffany, Ashley recalls being teased for his own name, and vows that their baby will not have an awkward name. The couple gets good news -- the house they want is theirs, but coming up with eight thousand dollars is a challenge. Blackground Records' President/CEO, Barry Hankerson, takes Ashley under his wing and gives him the money for the house plus a little extra. To celebrate a new future, Ashley sings a special anniversary song to his girlfriend, Tiffany on the beach.
2	"Moving Ahead"	January 16, 2006
Things are finally looking up for Ashley and Tiffany. They move out of her mother's small apartment and into a home of their own, bringing mom with them. With only one month's rent to their name, however, the struggle is far from over. At a meeting with Soul Power Productions, the producers beg Ashley to continue working with them. But Ashley feels that Soul Power didn't help him when he needed it most, and he severs all ties with them. Meanwhile, Ashley's former fellow O-Town member, Jacob Underwood, presents the parents-to-be with a toy chest he has built. This isn't the only surprise: the parents later go to First Look Sonogram and find out that they are having a boy. Back in the studio, Ashley's manager Larry hooks him up with top producing team The Matrix. Together, they come up with a tune for Ashley's unborn son, which also doubles as the There & Back show theme: "Soundtrack To Your Life."
3	"Bed Rest"	January 23, 2006
Telling Tiffany something that she doesn't want to hear is hard. And a very pregnant Tiff doesn't want to hear the doctor's order to remain in bed. Ashley arrives home to find that Tiffany is on the couch folding laundry, not in bed like she's supposed to be. As if that weren't bad enough, she then decides to head outside. Hours later, Tiffany glides in the door as though she did nothing wrong, prompting a big argument with Ashley. Ashley's level of stress peaks after the father-to-be learns that he has a negative balance in his bank account. Tiffany's mother, Scarlet, is happy to help, but now Ashley really feels the pressure to be a successful musician. Life provides inspiration, and Ashley translates his quarrels into a song. It's about thinking of the person that you argued with after you've walked away. The love birds bond when Ashley plays the song titled, "Stay With Me," for Tiffany.
4	"Birthday Boy"	January 30, 2006
Ashley reunites with former fellow O-Town member Dan Miller, in town for a Boys of Summer show featuring select guys from boy bands. When he finds out the show has been cancelled, he is crushed. It's a far cry from his days selling out stadiums with O-Town. Meanwhile, although things are coming along for Ashley, money is still tight. So why not have a yard sale? Because the neighbors will think we're trashy, objects Tiffany. Still, the prospect of making a couple hundred bucks for the baby convinces her to go along with it. Later, Tiffany freaks out again about her pregnancy. This time she claims that the baby isn't coming out because he doesn't like her. Ashley blames it on the stressful environment she and her mother Scarlett create, especially when Scarlett yells at people on the highway. Tiffany has Ashley on speaker phone and she overhears. Which certainly doesn't help her stress level. Ashley returns from rehearsing in the studio to find that Tiffany has arranged a star-studded surprise birthday party for him. Although Ashley told her that he doesn't like celebrating his birthday, he appreciates it because it relieves the stress that he's been facing - if just for the moment. But there's one unresolved issue to address. Ashley takes Scarlett aside to apologize for talking about the way she handles stress, and she accepts his apology. Back in the living room, while other former O-Town members, celebrities and friends party, Tiffany announces that she has contractions. The baby is coming soon.
5	"The Birth"	February 6, 2006
Tensions escalate between Ashley and Tiffany. In an attempt to make Tiffany feel better, Ashley suggests that she get a belly cast done. A little reluctant at first, Tiffany agrees. Things seem great until the ride home, when Ashley realizes he left their digital camera behind. Tiffany is fed up and accuses Ashley of constantly causing her stress. She goes so far as to say that she will not be able to trust him with the baby. The fight continues into the house as they both feel the pressures of this imminent birth. Moments later the couple makes up, although a scared Ashley fears not being able to support their growing family. The couple then heads to the hospital with a very pregnant Tiffany driving the car. After Tiffany's temperature is taken, a nervous Ashley asks to have his taken also. Finally, after what seems like endless hours of labor, the moment arrives: their little baby boy finally enters the world.
6	"Pop the Question"	February 13, 2006
Nobody said having a baby would be easy, but it looks like Ashley and Tiffany are gliding into parenthood with ease. The biggest problem these two have to face is finishing Lyric's nursery, which is looking to be a little bigger of a problem than they could have anticipated. With the nursery's final touch delayed indefinitely, who knows when Lyric will have a completed room of his own? Everyday Ashley's solo career is looking brighter and brighter. With the completion of a new track, it should be any day now that we see Ash back in the spotlight. Back on the home front Ash and Tiff's relationship is about to take a turn towards something a lot more serious. After they are approved by Tiffany's doctor to return to be intimate again, the young couple plans a romantic date night with one another. Tiffany can't believe her eyes when she discovers Lyric in his pen with a diamond ring around his neck and a jumper that reads, "Will You Marry My Daddy". Now, on top of Lyric's nursery, looks like the young couple have a wedding to plan.
7	"Whatever It Takes"	February 20, 2006
Times are tough for Ashley and Tiffany, they've got more bills every day and a very limited budget to work with. Since his O-Town money is running thin, Ashley is determined to get a new job in an effort to make some extra cash for his family. There's only problem, since Ash has spent the past several years being a pop star, he doesn't really have the qualifications necessary for your average 9-to-5. Turns out Ashley's good buddy from his O-Town days, Jacob Underwood, will be able to help him out with a new job in construction. Ashley hopes this will solve some financial problems while he tries to kick his solo career into high gear. Later, Ashley and his crew step out for a night on the town, only to run into trouble when a total stranger picks a fight with Ashley for no reason. Even more trouble ensues when Ashley is kicked out of the club for standing up for himself. Luckily, the group is able to salvage their evening and move everyone to a new hot spot. The next morning the previous night's escapades catch up with Ashley when he is awoken at the crack of dawn by his baby boy. For the first time, Ash comes to the realization that he's going to have to slow down the partying, and switch up his priorities a little bit.
8	"Chore Night"	February 27, 2006
As if trying to become a rock star while raising a family wasn't enough to fill Ashley's plate, it looks like he is also going to have to start worrying about picking up after himself. Turns out that Charlotte and Tiffany's patience with Ashley not pulling his weight at home are running thin, and they're desperate to find a way to get Ashley to help out a little more around the house. Tiffany has the idea to create a chore chart so that everyone can understand what jobs need to get done. Later on, Ashley gets out of the house for a little down time with his buddies Trevor and Jackie. The boys head out to Disco Delve's Sushi Bar and are greeted with a night of sushi and dancing. When Ashley gets home he must face the dreaded chore chart. Trevor, who is sympathetic to Ashley's cause, helps him out by taking out the trash. Meanwhile Ashley has been spending a lot of time with his friend Xandy Barry, writing and recording new music. Xandy helps Ashley get his first gig as a solo artist at a local L.A. open- mic night. Ashley, who is used to big bucks from his O-Town gigs, is shocked when Xandy tells him he'll only make money from a tip-jar. Since this is his first time performing in a long while, Ashley is naturally very nervous beforehand. Ashley performs his new song "My Apology" at the small club, and the show is flawless until he accidentally hits the wrong chord towards the end of the song. Regardless of a minor slipup, and only getting paid in tips, Ashley is glad that he got up on stage again and is one step closer to being a rock star.
9	"Weekend in Vegas"	March 6, 2006
It seems like Ashley has been working harder than ever. Between writing and recording a rock album, keeping the house clean, and raising his son Lyric, Ash definitely has his hands full. Tiffany, who is determined to ease some of Ashley's stress, plans a surprise visit from Ashley's mom Paula. In these stressful times, a little help from mom is just the extra boost that Ashley needs. When Paula's visit is over, Ashley is sad to see her leave. He is, however, excited when he learns that his manager is sending him and his friends away for a weekend off in Las Vegas. Ash is even more psyched once he gets to Vegas and learns they will be staying in the penthouse at the Palms Resort. After a night on the casino floor, Ashley has a revelation that he wants to marry Tiffany in Vegas. When Ashley dares Tiffany to fly home with him as his wife, Tiffany accepts and tells their limo driver to take them to the chapel. Everything goes as planned until Tiffany backs down at the last second, not because she doesn't want to marry, but because the entire family isn't present. Looks like Ashley is going to have to wait a little longer to be a husband.
10	"Season Finale"	March 13, 2006
Fame and fortune should be just around the corner considering all the work Ashley has been putting in lately. Now that he's finished recording his album, Ashley is going to have to start promoting it, which is going to be an uphill battle in itself. Since most people are used to seeing Ashley during his O-Town days, he has to convince nearly everyone that he's a credible musician. This means hours on the phone and at radio stations doing interviews, and weeks at a time on the road playing back-to-back gigs. Because he is going to spending so much time promoting his new album, it's going to be hard for Ashley to be spend as much time at home as he's used to. When Ashley has to break lunch plans with Tiffany and his son Lyric to do phone interviews all day, she is disappointed. Ash and Tiff's relationship is put to the ultimate test when Tiffany finds out that Ashley will be leaving home for several weeks to go on tour by himself. Seeing how upset Tiffany is about him leaving home, Ashley works out a special plan with his manager that will allow Tiffany and Lyric to meet up with him on the road from time to time. All of Ashley's hard work pays off when he gets a call from his manager informing him that his advance check has finally arrived. Finally Ashley will have the means to provide for his family. On the way to pick up his check, Ashley receives a phone call informing him that his music is being played on the radio. It seems that after all his struggling Ashley is on his way back to stardom.
