= Soundtrack to Your Life (album) =

Studio album by Ashley Parker Angel
- Released: May 16, 2006
- Genre: Pop-punk; pop rock
- Length: 47:06
- Label: Blackground; Universal
- Producer: Dr. Luke; Max Martin; The Matrix; Alex Cantrall; Soulshock and Karlin

Singles from Soundtrack to Your Life
- 1. "Let U Go" Released: February 14, 2006; 2. "Soundtrack to Your Life" Released: 2006

Soundtrack to Your Life is the debut studio album by American singer Ashley Parker Angel. It was released on May 16, 2006, by Blackground Records and Universal Records. Following the 2003 disbandment of Angel's band O-Town, he sought to gain more credibility as a musician. Angel began to adopt a more mature image as a rock artist opposed to the previous pop music recorded by the group.

On August 5, 2021, Blackground Records announced on Twitter that the album will be available on streaming services on September 24, 2021, for the first time.

== Critical reception ==
Professional ratings
Review scores
Source	Rating
AllMusic	3.5/5 stars
PopMatters	4/10

Leah Greenblatt of Entertainment Weekly referred to the music as "surprisingly ... pretty catchy".

== Commercial performance ==
The album debuted number 5 on the US Billboard 200 chart selling 72,000 copies in its first week.

== Track listing ==
1. "Let U Go" (Written By: A. Parker, M. Martin, L. Gottwald)
2. "I'm Better" (Written By: A. Parker, S. Peiken, M. Martin, L.Gottwald)
3. "Soundtrack to Your Life" (Written By: A.Parker, L.Christy, G.Edwards, S.Spock)
4. "Feel So Alive" (Written By: A.Parker, X.Barry, W.Gagel)
5. "Crazy Beautiful" (Written By: A.Parker, L.Christy, G.Edwards, S.Spock)
6. "Who Cares" (Written By: A.Parker, K.Karlin, A.Cantrall, C.Schack, R.Math)
7. "Shades of Blue" (Written By: A.Parker, K.Karlin, A.Cantrall, S.Hurley)
8. "Beautiful Lie" (Written By: A.Parker, K.Karlin, A.Cantrall)
9. "Perfect Now" (Written By: A.Parker, K.Karlin, A.Cantrall, Gary Clark, E.Pressly, K.Hawkes)
10. "Where Did You Go" (Written By: A.Parker, K.Karlin, A.Cantrall)
11. "Along the Way" (Written By: A.Parker, K.Karlin, A.Cantrall, L.Robbins)
12. "Apology" (Written By: A.Parker, X.Barry)

Target Bonus Download Track:

1. "Live Before I Die" (Written By: A.Parker, L.Christy, G.Edwards, S.Spock)
2. "Alright, OK" (Written By: A.Parker, K.Karlin, A.Cantrall, C.Schack, R.Math)

== Singles ==
The first single from Soundtrack to Your Life was "Let U Go", released to US markets on February 26, 2006. It debuted at #17 on the Billboard Hot 100, eventually peaking at #12. It was certified Gold on June 1, 2006. The follow-up single from the album was the title track "Soundtrack to Your Life".

== Charts ==
Weekly chart performance for Soundtrack to Your Life
Chart (2006)	Peak position
US Billboard 200	5
