= Liquid Dreams (song) =

2000 single by O-Town

Single by O-Town

from the album O-Town
- B-side: "All for Love"; "Take Me Under"
- Released: October 31, 2000
- Recorded: 2000
- Genre: Pop
- Length: 3:29
- Label: J; BMG
- Songwriters: Bradley Spalter; Quincy Patrick; Joshua Thompson; Michael Norfleet
- Producers: Bradley Spalter; Joshua P. Thompson

O-Town singles chronology
"Liquid Dreams" (2000)	"All or Nothing" (2001)

Music video
- "Liquid Dreams" on YouTube

"Liquid Dreams" is a song by American boy band O-Town. It was released on October 31, 2000, as the lead single from their debut album, O-Town. The song is about wet dreams filled with sexual innuendos and pop culture references, including references to Destiny's Child, Madonna, and Janet Jackson. Commercially, "Liquid Dreams" reached number one in Canada, number 10 in the United States, and number three in the United Kingdom.

== Background ==
O-Town was assembled for the first season of the ABC reality television series Making the Band. Originally Ikaika Kahoano was one of the five members selected but he and his family decided he should go to med school instead causing him to back out, making way for Dan Miller who was selected by the four remaining members.

The ratings of Making the Band were strong enough to warrant a second (and eventually third) season. These subsequent seasons depicted their development as a pop group, following their tours and performances. Such events included the development of their second album, O2, their transition to a new record label (J Records), and an ongoing effort to establish themselves. The third season of Making the Band was broadcast on MTV, instead of the original network, ABC. After season one, Clive Davis of J Records signed O-Town to his new label as he believed in the marketability of the group, and scheduled O-Town to be the label's debut act.

The song references a dozen famous female actresses and musicians including Destiny's Child, Madonna, Janet Jackson, Cindy Crawford, Tyra Banks, Angelina Jolie, Salma Hayek, and Halle Berry. The name Jennifer is mentioned, but no last name is given, leading to speculation that it may be Jennifer Lopez, Jennifer Aniston or Jennifer Love Hewitt.

== Track listings ==
US CD and cassette single

1. "Liquid Dreams" – 3:29
2. "Liquid Dreams" (Matrix remix) – 3:26
3. "All for Love" – 3:26

UK CD1

1. "Liquid Dreams" – 3:30
2. "Liquid Dreams" (Rizzo Mixshow) – 6:24
3. "Take Me Under" – 4:08

UK CD2

1. "Liquid Dreams" – 3:30
2. "Liquid Dreams" (HQ2 Mixshow) – 5:48
3. "Liquid Dreams" (HQ2 instrumental) – 5:48
4. "Liquid Dreams" (video)

UK cassette single

1. "Liquid Dreams" – 3:29
2. "Take Me Under" – 4:08

European CD single

1. "Liquid Dreams" – 3:29
2. "All for Love" – 3:26

Australian CD single

1. "Liquid Dreams" – 3:29
2. "All for Love" – 3:26
3. "Liquid Dreams" (Matrix mix) – 3:26
4. "Liquid Dreams" (Hot Hex Hector remix) – 3:11

== Credits and personnel ==
Credits are taken from the US CD single liner notes.

Studio

- Mixed at Larrabee North (Los Angeles)

Personnel

- Bradley Spalter – writing, production, programming
- Joshua P. Thompson – writing (as Joshua Thompson), vocal arrangement and production
- Michael Norfleet – writing, programming
- Quincy Patrick – writing, vocal arrangement and production
- David Pic Conley – associate vocal production
- Adam Kagan – engineering, programming
- Adam Barber – engineering
- Pete Karam – engineering
- Clive Davis – executive production

== Charts ==
=== Weekly charts ===
Chart (2000–2001)	Peak position
Australia (ARIA)	61
Belgium (Ultratip Bubbling Under Flanders)	11
Canada (Nielsen SoundScan)	1
Europe (Eurochart Hot 100)	12
Germany (GfK)	44
Ireland (IRMA)	13
New Zealand (Recorded Music NZ)	41
Scotland Singles (OCC)	3
Sweden (Sverigetopplistan)	48
Switzerland (Schweizer Hitparade)	71
UK Singles (OCC)	3
US Billboard Hot 100	10
US Pop Airplay (Billboard)	25

=== Year-end charts ===
Chart (2001)	Position
Canada (Nielsen SoundScan)	58
UK Singles (OCC)	82
US Mainstream Top 40 (Billboard)	96

== Certifications ==
Region	Certification	Certified units/sales
United States (RIAA)	Gold	500,000^{^}
^{^} Shipments figures based on certification alone.

== Release history ==
Region	Date	Format(s)	Label(s)	Ref.
United States	October 31, 2000	Contemporary hit radio	J	
United States	December 5, 2000	7-inch vinyl; 12-inch vinyl; CD; cassette	J	
Denmark	February 12, 2001	CD	J; BMG	
Australia	March 12, 2001	CD	J; BMG	
United Kingdom	April 16, 2001	CD; cassette	J; BMG	
