= O-Town (album) =

Studio album by O-Town
- Released: January 23, 2001
- Recorded: 2000
- Genre: Pop
- Length: 42:59
- Labels: J; Trans Continental; BMG
- Producers: Pic Conley; Warryn Campbell; Cutfather & Joe; Dakari; Clive Davis (exec.); Dane DeViller; David Frank; Sean Hosein; Mark Hudson; Steve Kipner; David Kopatz; Jack Kugel; Harold Lilly; Steve Mac; Michael Mangini; Quincy Patrick; Bradley Spalter; Joshua Thompson

O-Town chronology
O-Town (2001)	O2 (2002)

Singles from O-Town
- 1. "Liquid Dreams" Released: October 31, 2000; 2. "All or Nothing" Released: March 20, 2001; 3. "We Fit Together" Released: September 4, 2001; 4. "Love Should Be a Crime" Released: February 11, 2002

O-Town is the debut studio album released by American boy band O-Town. It was released on January 23, 2001, in the United States by J Records, Trans Continental Records, and BMG.

== Background ==
The album was first released on January 23, 2001, in the United States. It contained a total of twelve tracks. Around this time, the album was also released in Japan, with two bonus remixes exclusively for the market. In March 2001, the band were asked into the studio to record a song for the Dr. Dolittle 2 soundtrack. The track, "We Fit Together", featured on the soundtrack, released in June 2001. Following the release of the single "All or Nothing", the album was released in Europe and the United Kingdom on August 6, 2001, complete with "We Fit Together" as a bonus track, bringing the number of tracks to thirteen. As "We Fit Together" was not included on the original American version of the album, American fans were treated to a "Special Fan Edition" of the album on May 28, 2002. The fan edition was also made available in Germany.

== Singles ==
"Liquid Dreams" was released as the album's lead single and became a top ten hit on the US Billboard Hot 100. It was followed by "All or Nothing", "We Fit Together" and "Love Should Be A Crime". "All or Nothing" peaked at number three on the US Adult Contemporary chart, while "We Fit Together" stalled at number 4 on the Billboard Bubbling Under Hot 100 Singles chart. "Love Should Be a Crime" was not featured on any Billboard charts at all, although it made it to the top 40 in the UK, becoming the lowest-charting single from the album.

== Critical reception ==
Professional ratings
Review scores
Source	Rating
AllMusic	1.5/5 stars
Entertainment Weekly	C-
MTV Asia	5/10
Robert Christgau	(dud)
Rolling Stone	2/5 stars
USA Today	1/4 stars
Wall of Sound	57/100
Yahoo! Music UK	6/10

O-Town received mixed-to-negative reviews from critics. AllMusic editor Michael Gallucci rated the album one and a half stars out of five and wrote: "On their flaccid self-titled debut, the fivesome go through the motions directed to them by a squad of industry moneymakers. To say there isn't an ounce of sincerity to be found within the 12 songs here is pretty much taken for granted. That the entire project whiffs of cynicism is inexcusable." Chicago Tribune critic Allison Stewart found that "O-Town, while not uniquely horrible, is certainly the worst of the recent spate of boy band offerings. It's filled with moony, harmony-heavy songs that (the occasional R&B track aside) bear the unfortunate imprint of soft rock. It's enough to make one long for the Backstreet Boys, who, for all their faults, would have considered something like the chowderheaded "Sexiest Woman Alive" beneath their dignity. Entertainment Weekly's Davdi Browne felt that "the songs are mildly tuneful at times."

== Commercial performance ==
In the United States, O-Town debuted at number five on the US Billboard 200.Just one month after it released, the album was certified platinum by the Recording Industry Association of America (RIAA). It also was a commercial success across Europe and North America, debuting in the top 10 of Canada, Iceland and the United Kingdom. O-Town eventually hit 1,700,000 copies, and over 3 million worldwide, becoming the band's most successful album.

== Track listing ==
International standard edition
No.	Title	Writer(s)	Producer(s)	Length
1.	"Liquid Dreams"	Quincy Patrick; Joshua Thompson; Bradley Spalter; Michael Norfleet	Thompson; Spalter; Patrick^{[a]}	3:30
2.	"Every Six Seconds"	Steve Kipner; David Kopatz; Jack Kugell	Kipner; Kopatz; Kugell	3:13
3.	"Girl"	Harold Lilly; Warryn Campbell; John "Jubu" Smith	Campbell; Lilly^{[a]}	3:36
4.	"Sexiest Woman Alive"	Spalter; Thompson; Patrick; Norfleet	Spalter; Thompson; Patrick	3:40
5.	"Love Should Be a Crime"	Desmond Child; Gregg Sutton; Jesse James Dupree	Michael Mangini; Mark Hudson	3:18
6.	"Shy Girl"	Dane DeViller; Sean Hosein; Kipner	DeViller; Hosein; Kipner	4:10
7.	"All or Nothing"	Wayne Hector; Steve Mac	Mac	4:41
8.	"Sensitive"	Kipner; David Frank; Herbie Crichlow	Frank; Kipner	3:23
9.	"The Painter"	DeViller; Hosein	DeViller; Hosein	3:55
10.	"Take Me Under"	Jacob Underwood; Dakari; Tony Dawson-Harrison	Dakari	4:08
11.	"All for Love"	Dakari	Dakari	3:29
12.	"Baby I Would"	Diane Warren	Dakari	3:53

North American standard edition and European bonus track
No.	Title	Writer(s)	Producer(s)	Length
13.	"We Fit Together"	Mich Hansen; Joe Belmaati; Remee	Cutfather & Joe	3:56

Japanese bonus tracks
No.	Title	Writer(s)	Producer(s)	Length
13.	"Liquid Dreams" (HQ2 radio mix)	Patrick; Thompson; Spalter; Norfleet	Thompson; Spalter; Patrick^{[a]}; Conley^{[b]}	3:56
14.	"Liquid Dreams" (Mike Rizzo radio mix)	Patrick; Thompson; Spalter; Norfleet	Thompson; Spalter; Patrick^{[a]}^{[b}	3:56

Special Fan Edition bonus tracks
No.	Title	Writer(s)	Producer(s)	Length
13.	"We Fit Together"	Hansen; Belmaati; Remee	Cutfather & Joe	3:56
14.	"Love Should Be a Crime" (music video)
15.	"Girl" (Live in California) (video)
16.	"Band Video Greetings" (video)

Notes

- ^{^[a]} signifies a vocal producer
- ^{^[b]} signifies an associate vocal producer

== Charts ==
=== Weekly charts ===
Weekly chart performance for O-Town
Chart (2001–02)	Peak position
Austrian Albums (Ö3 Austria)	22
Canadian Albums (Billboard)	2
Dutch Albums (Album Top 100)	37
European Top 100 Albums (Music & Media)	32
German Albums (Offizielle Top 100)	14
Icelandic Albums (Tónlist)	7
Irish Albums (IRMA)	34
Scottish Albums (Official Charts)	10
Swiss Albums (Schweizer Hitparade)	50
UK Albums (Official Charts)	7
US Billboard 200	5

=== Year-end charts ===
Year-end chart performance for O-Town
Chart (2001	Peak position
Canadian Albums (Nielsen SoundScan)	35
US Billboard 200	66
Worldwide Albums (IFPI)	46

== Certifications ==
Certifications for O-Town
Region	Certification	Certified units/sales
Canada (Music Canada)	Platinum	100,000^{^}
United Kingdom (BPI)	Silver	60,000^{^}
United States (RIAA)	Platinum	1,000,000^{^}
^{^} Shipments figures based on certification alone.
