= O-Town =

American boy band

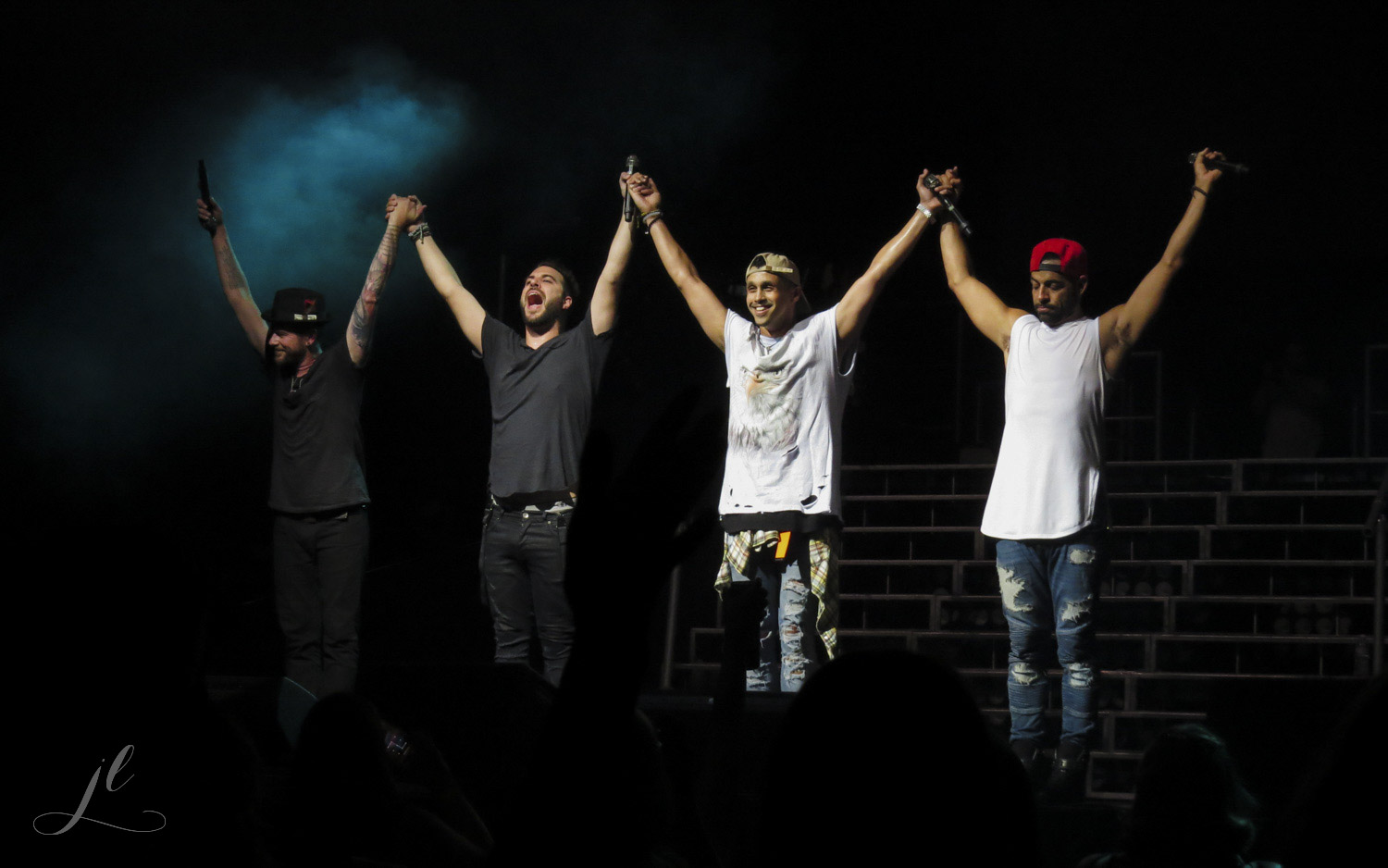
- O-Town performing on the My2K Tour in 2016.

Background information
- Origin: Orlando, Florida, U.S.
- Genre: Pop
- Years active: 2000–2003, 2013–present
- Labels: Sony BMG; Transcontinental; J; Atlantic; Elektra; Warner; UMG
- Members: Dan Miller; Erik-Michael Estrada; Jacob Underwood; Trevor Penick
- Past members: Ashley Parker Angel; Ikaika Kahoano
- Website: Official website

O-Town is an American boy band formed from the first season of the reality television series Making the Band in 2000. The group's original lineup consisted of Erik-Michael Estrada, Trevor Penick, Jacob Underwood, Ashley Parker Angel and Ikaika Kahoano. Kahoano left the group and was replaced by Dan Miller.

After releasing two albums near the end of the boy band fad of the late 1990s and early 2000s, the group disbanded in 2003. The group was originally managed by Lou Pearlman during their first season of Making the Band, but later managed by Mike Cronin and Mike Morin for their debut album and remaining television seasons.

The group reunited in 2013 without Ashley Parker Angel. They released their third studio album, "Lines & Circles", in 2014, followed by "The O.T.W.N. Album" in 2019.

In October 2026, O-Town released a new single called "Certified Delulu".

== History ==
=== Formation and debut album (1999–2001) ===
O-Town was assembled for the first season of the ABC reality television series Making the Band; the group was named after Orlando, Florida, the city where auditions were held. In the selection process, Lou Pearlman and a panel of judges selected Ashley Parker Angel, Erik Michael Estrada, Trevor Penick, Jacob Underwood, and Ikaika Kahoano. However, Kahoano left for personal reasons and was replaced by Dan Miller.

After season one, former Arista Records executive Clive Davis signed O-Town to his new label J Records. Their first release, the self-titled O-Town, boosted by the publicity of the weekly television series, debuted at No. 5 on the Billboard 200 and sold more than three million copies worldwide. Their first single, "Liquid Dreams", peaked at number 10 on the Billboard Hot 100.

In the late spring of 2001, O-Town released "All or Nothing", which became the biggest hit of their career as a group, reaching no. 3 on the Hot 100. In 2001, the group was the opening act for Britney Spears' Dream Within a Dream Tour in the U.S.

=== O2 and split (2002–2003) ===
O-Town's second album O2 was released in November 2002 by J Records. It included a newer single, "We Fit Together". The album was observed to have a different sound from O-Town's debut album, with a mix of "soulful ballads and songs with more of a rock ‘n’ roll approach," according to Contemporary Musicians. MTV News reported that O-Town hoped that the album would show the group to be more than "'NSYNC wannabes." However, with teen pop trending down in listener interest in 2002, O2 did not sell as well as the first O-Town album. As a result, in 2003, J Records released O-Town from their contract, and the group disbanded.

According to OK! Magazine, O-Town sold 5.5 million albums during their initial three-year career.

=== Solo careers (2003–2013) ===
The members of O-Town moved on to solo careers. The most successful member was Ashley Parker Angel, who was signed to Universal's Blackground Records, also given his own reality show on MTV, There and Back. Angel released a solo album, Soundtrack to Your Life, in 2006. In 2007, he began playing the role of Link Larkin in the Broadway production of Hairspray.

Trevor Penick signed to Mach 1 Music and performed as Tre Scott.

Erik Michael Estrada stayed in the music business as a songwriter. Jacob Underwood went on to start his own country band, Jacob's Loc.

In 2013, Angel declined to join the O-Town reunion: "It was a difficult decision, but ultimately necessary to move on to the next chapter of my career."

=== Reunion, Lines & Circles, The O.T.W.N. Album and Touring (2013–2024) ===
On May 28, 2014, O-Town released a preview of the single "Skydive" on SoundCloud. The single was released from their third studio album, "Lines & Circles", which was released on August 24, 2014.

Following their 2013 reunion, O-Town initially planned to tour for one summer, but continued performing after the release of Lines & Circles in 2014. The album supported approximately three years of touring, and the group later performed alongside other late-1990s and early-2000s pop acts, including 98 Degrees and Ryan Cabrera.

In 2016, O-Town participated in the MY2K Tour, alongside 98 Degrees, Ryan Cabrera and Dream. The tour began in July and included performances across the United States.

In 2017, they premiered a new single "Empty Space" in addition to announcing a new EP called as "Pt. 1".

In 2017, O-Town joined the lineup of the I Love the '90s – The Party Continues Tour, which featured performers from the 1990s, including TLC, Naughty by Nature and Color Me Badd.

Their "Pt. 1" EP was released on August 4, 2017.

In June 2019, O-Town became involved in a trademark dispute with Universal Music Group, which argued that the band's proposed trademark was too similar to the Motown Records name.

On August 2, 2019, they released The O.T.W.N. Album.

O-Town continued performing on the Pop 2000 Tour in the early 2020s, appearing alongside artists including Chris Kirkpatrick of *NSYNC, Ryan Cabrera and LFO. The tour included performances at venues and festivals across the United States.

In 2024, O-Town continued performing on the Pop 2000 Tour alongside artists including Chris Kirkpatrick, BBMak, Ryan Cabrera and LFO, and scheduled performances marking the tenth anniversary of "Lines & Circles".

=== Ongoing activities, touring and new music (2025–present) ===
In January 2025, The Hollywood Reporter reported that O-Town was facing damage to its brand and difficulties booking performances because of its perceived association with Sean Combs, also known as Diddy, who had been arrested in September 2024 on federal sex trafficking and racketeering charges. The confusion stemmed from the fact that both O-Town and Combs had appeared on Making the Band, although Combs joined the series after O-Town's involvement had ended. The group had originally appeared on the show during the period when it was produced by Lou Pearlman.

In 2026, the group announced performances celebrating the 25th anniversary of their debut album "O-Town", with plans to perform the album in its entirety.

In October 2026, O-Town released the single "Certified Delulu".

== Members ==
Current

- Dan Miller (2000–2003, 2013–present)
- Erik-Michael Estrada (2000–2003, 2013–present)
- Jacob Underwood (2000–2003, 2013–present)
- Trevor Penick (2000–2003, 2013–present)

Former

- Ashley Parker Angel (2000–2003)
- Ikaika Kahoano (2000)

== Discography ==
Studio albums

- O-Town (2001)
- O2 (2002)
- Lines & Circles (2014)
- The O.T.W.N. Album (2019)

== Awards and nominations ==
Year	Award	Category	Work	Result	Ref.
2001	Teen Choice Awards	Choice Music: Breakout Artist	Themselves	Won	
2001	Teen Choice Awards	Choice Music: Pop Group	Themselves	Nominated	

== Tours ==
=== Opening act ===
- Britney Spears – Dream Within a Dream Tour (2001)
- Pop2000Tour hosted by Chris Kirkpatrick. (active)
- Viral campaign surfaced which suggested O-Town as the headliner for the Upstate NY annual festival at the Afton Fairgrounds. Rumor turned out to be false, disappointing many local fans (2000).

First First season of show	Making the Band winners 2000	Succeeded by Da Band
