= Ashley Parker Angel =

American musician

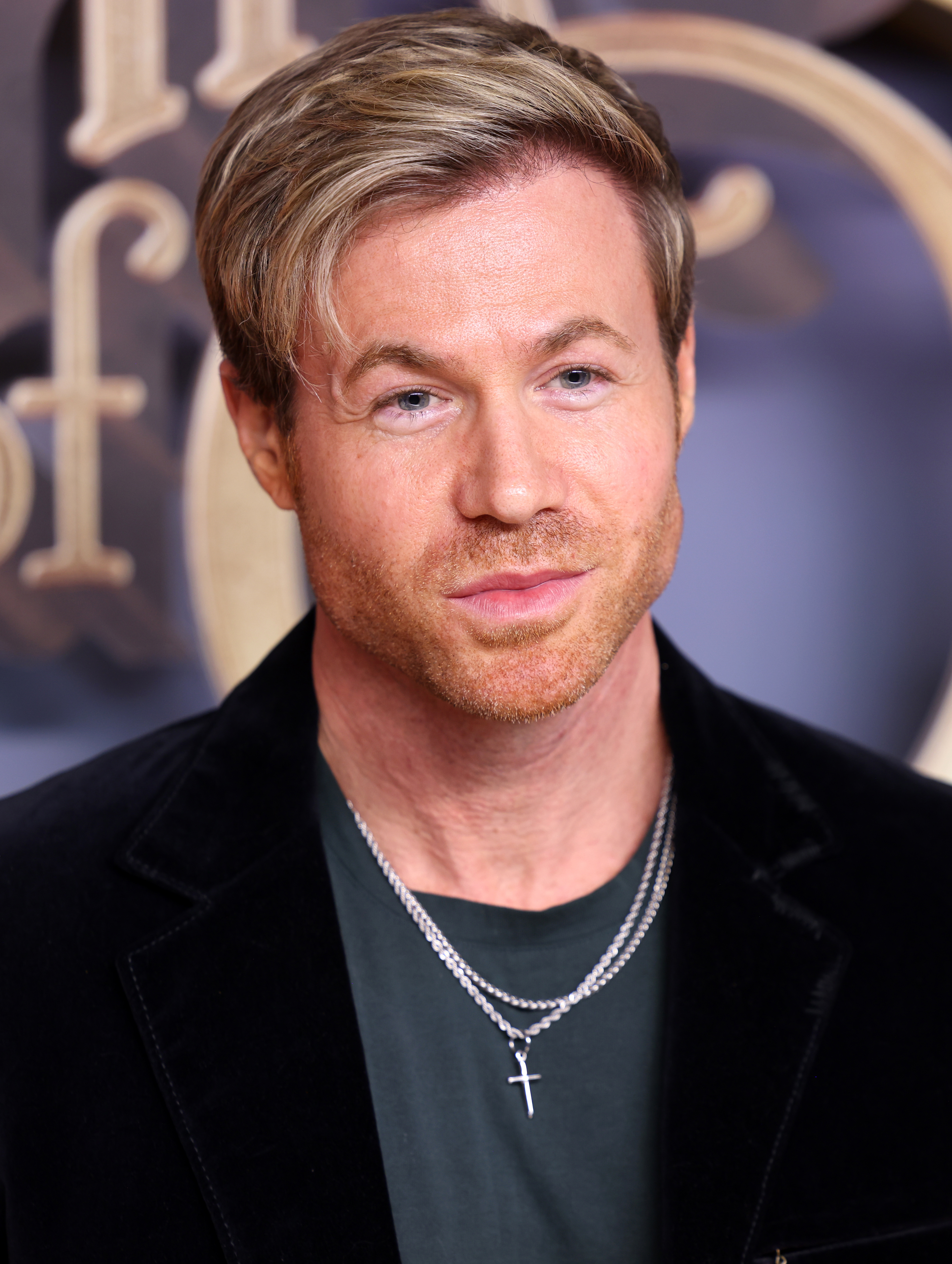
- Angel in 2025
- Born: Redding, California
- Occupations: Musician; actor
- Years active: 2000–present
- Musical career
- Genres: Pop rock; pop
- Instruments: Vocals; guitar; piano
- Label: Blackground/Universal
- Formerly of: O-Town
- Website: ashleyparkerangel.com

Ashley Parker Angel is an American musician, actor and entrepreneur who rose to prominence as a member of the boy band O-Town. Following the group's initial disbandment, he pursued a solo music career and later established himself in musical theatre, appearing in Broadway and touring productions including Hairspray and Wicked. He subsequently entered the health and wellness industry, co-founding businesses focused on fitness coaching and nutritional supplements.

== Early years ==
Ashley Parker Angel was born Ashley Ward Parker and grew up in Redding, California. He is the son of Darren Parker and Paula Angel and has German and Irish ancestry. He was named after the character Ashley Wilkes, from Margaret Mitchell's 1936 novel Gone with the Wind, and its subsequent film adaptation, which was a favorite of his mother. Following his mother’s marriage to Ron Angel, he legally changed his name to Ashley Parker Angel. He has four siblings: brothers Taylor and Justin, and sisters Annie and Emily.

Angel was raised as a Jehovah's Witness. During his teens, he was disfellowshipped from the religious community after pursuing a career in performing. At 16, he left the family home and moved in with a friend, having appeared in a local production of Grease.

== Career ==
=== O-Town and Making the Band ===
In 2000 Ashley Parker Angel achieved fame on the hit ABC series Making the Band, which tracked the formation of a pop music group. The MTV production was the first reality show to be picked up by a major television network. Weekly, viewers saw Parker Angel, after first being plucked from tens of thousands of other auditionees, survive each stage of the selection process to become one of the "final five" members of the new vocal group O-Town.

Ratings were strong, and as a result O-Town quickly achieved success; by the end of the first season, the group had signed a record deal with music legend Clive Davis and became the debut act for Davis' new label J Records. The album O-Town, boosted by the weekly TV publicity, debuted at No. 5 on Billboard and went on to multi-platinum status. "Liquid Dreams," the album's first release, crowned the SoundScan singles chart at No. 1, selling over 42,000 units in one week.. The group won the 2001 Teen Choice Award for Breakthrough Artist.

Because of O-Town, J Records made musical history as the first label in SoundScan history (1991 and on) to have its first single release debut at No. 1 on the sales charts. Also, O-Town is the first artist in SoundScan history to have its first single come in at No. 1, an achievement recorded in the 2002 Guinness Book of World Records.

In late spring 2001, the second single, "All or Nothing," and became the biggest hit of O-Town's career. The song reached No. 1 on the U.S. top 40 chart and was nominated for numerous awards, including Song of the Year during the 2001 Radio Music Awards.

The group toured internationally, and went on to be the first reality show cast to remain unchanged for a second and third season. Near the end of the third season, viewers watched O-Town striving to take their careers to the next level, writing their own music, earning the respect of industry peers, and marketing themselves as more than a "boy band." Unfortunately, by the time of the release of their second album, O2, the teen-pop genre had begun to fade, and they did not find the acceptance they sought. Despite moderate success, O2 got nowhere near the market impact of their first album. In November 2003 J Records dropped the band from the label.

In January 2011, O-Town confirmed their reunion plans, four days after confirming the band had gotten back together Ashley released a statement via TMZ.com that he wouldn't be reuniting with the band causing an uproar with the fans and media due to Ashley being a key member during O-Town.

O-Town was one of the greatest chapters of my life, so when the idea of a reunion was brought to me, of course I was intrigued. However I have made the decision not to be a part of an O-Town reunion. It was a difficult decision, but ultimately necessary to move on with the next chapter of my career.

=== Solo music career and There & Back ===
Following the dissolution of O-Town, Angel pursued a solo music career. His efforts to establish himself independently were documented in the MTV reality series "There & Back: Ashley Parker Angel", which premiered on January 9, 2006. The ten-episode series followed Angel as he worked on his debut solo album while navigating financial difficulties, the demands of his career and the arrival of his first child.

Angel's debut solo album, "Soundtrack to Your Life", was released on May 16, 2006, through Blackground Records and Universal Records. The album marked a change in musical direction from O-Town's teen pop, incorporating pop-rock and melodic rock influences. Angel co-wrote the album's songs and worked with producers including Max Martin, Dr. Luke, the Matrix, and Soulshock and Karlin. The album debuted at number five on the Billboard 200, selling approximately 72,000 copies in its first week. In 2022, the album was reissued on vinyl as a double LP by Blackground Records and EMPIRE.

The album's lead single, "Let U Go", was released in February 2006. It reached number 12 on the US Billboard Hot 100 and number one on MTV's Total Request Live video countdown.

Following the album's release, Angel promoted "Soundtrack to Your Life" through radio appearances and live performances, including dates on the Teen People Rock N Shop tour and as an opening act on Ashlee Simpson's 2006 summer tour. "Where Did You Go" was considered for release as a subsequent second single, although it was never officially released and Angel subsequently focused on acting and theatre, making his Broadway debut in Hairspray in 2007.

In 2012, Angel worked with songwriter and musician Xandy Barry on a musical project called Mansions of Arcadia, also known as MOA. In January of that year, he shared the song "Don't Let Me Down" on social media platforms. However, no further releases from the project were documented, and its subsequent status remains unclear.

In 2014, Angel said he was continuing to write music while signed to EMI Music Publishing and indicated that he intended to release a second solo album.

=== Acting, television and theatre ===
Angel's early acting credits included voice roles in video games during the 1990s. He voiced Alex in Lunar: The Silver Star and reprised the role in Lunar: Silver Star Story Complete. His other video-game credits included Vay and Popful Mail and Magic Knight Rayearth.

Angel subsequently appeared various movie and television shows. He appeared as himself alongside fellow O-Town members in Longshot and SuperBabies: Baby Geniuses 2. His later film credits included Wild Things: Foursome, in which he played Carson Wheetly, and Pizza Man in which he played Todd. He also appeared in Amelia's 25th and The Dog Lover.

In January 2007, Angel made his Broadway debut as Link Larkin in the musical Hairspray at the Neil Simon Theatre in New York City. He remained with the production until September 2008.

In June 2009, Angel voiced pop singer Danny Starr in the Disney Channel animated series Handy Manny. The episode featured the original song "Twisty Turn Twist", which Angel performed and co-wrote.

In November 2014, Angel joined the second North American touring production of the musical Wicked, playing Fiyero. He remained with the touring production until August 2015. He later returned to the role in the Broadway production at the Gershwin Theatre on July 31, 2017, and remained with the cast until July 14, 2018.

In an interview with Elvis Duran and the Morning Show, Angel said he had turned down an offer to play William Shakespeare in the debut Broadway musical & Juliet because he was committing to his health and wellness business.

In 2023, Angel competed in the tenth season of the American singing competition series The Masked Singer as S'more. He was eliminated during the Group A Finals episode, titled "Disco Night", where he performed an encore of O-Town's song "All or Nothing".

== Entrepreneurship ==
In 2016, Angel entered the health and wellness industry by co-founding "High Level Nutrition", a nutritional supplement business, with business partner Bobby Klebanoff. The company's debut product was "Next Level Focus". By September 2021, its product range had expanded to include supplements marketed for focus, sleep, energy, digestive health, beauty and sports nutrition.

In 2018, Angel launched "High Level Performance Academy". The online coaching platform offered personalised workout programmes and meal plans, one-to-one coaching, progress check-ins and access to a fitness community. Angel described the programme as combining fitness and nutrition guidance with motivation and accountability.

They later rebranded "High Level Nutrition" to "High Level Science" in partnership with cardiologist David Rizik.

On 11 February 2026, "High Level Science" announced a retail partnership with GNC, making Heart + Body + Mind and High Level Man available through nearly 1,000 GNC stores and the retailer's website as part of its The Drop initiative.

== Discography ==
=== Albums ===
- 2006 – Soundtrack to Your Life

=== Singles ===
- 2006 – "Let U Go"
- 2006 – "Soundtrack to Your Life"
- 2006 – "Where Did You Go"
- 2012 – "Don't Let Me Down" (with Mansions of Arcadia)
- 2013 – "Switchblade" (with DJ Danny McCarthy)

== Filmography ==
Year	Film	Role	Notes
2000	Longshot	Ashley Angel	Ashley played himself with O-Town
2010	Wild Things: Foursome	Carson Wheetly	Filmed in 2009 in Miami
2010	Pizza Man	Todd	Filming began March 2010
2011	Chubby Chaser	Benjamin	Digital Short, filmed in 2010
2012	Amelia's 25th	Jacob	Filmed in early 2011
2013	Held Up	Steven	Digital Short, filmed in 2013.
2014	Trona	Tommy	Digital Short produced by Ashley, filmed in 2013.
2015	The Wrong Side of Right	Michael Ames	Filmed in 2014
2016	L.A. Stories	Steven	Digital Short based on previous short "Held Up", Filmed in 2014.

=== Television and video games ===
Year	Film	Role	Notes
1992	Lunar: The Silver Star	Alex	Voice of the video game character
1994	Vay	Pottle	Voice of the video game character
1994	Popful Mail	Slick	Voice of the video game character
1997	Magic Knight Rayearth	Ferio	Voice of the video game character
1998	Lunar: Silver Star Story Complete	Alex	Voice of the video game character
2000–2002	Making the Band	Himself	O-Town's Reality Show
2002	All That	Himself	Played himself with O-Town, Episode 6
2002	Clone High	Himself	Voiced himself, Episode 7
2006	There & Back	Himself	MTV Reality Show
2006	Punk'd	Himself	MTV Reality Show, Season 7, Episode 1
2009–2011	Handy Manny	Danny Starr	Voice of the character in "Danny Starr", "The Twisty Turn Twist"
2023	The Masked Singer	Himself/S'more	Season 10 contestant

=== Theater ===
Year	Title	Role	Venue	Notes
2007–2008	Hairspray	Link Larkin	Neil Simon Theatre	Broadway replacement
2014–2015	Wicked	Fiyero	2nd National Tour	Tour replacement
2017–2018	Wicked	Fiyero	Gershwin Theatre	Broadway replacement
