= List of Love & Hip Hop franchise cast members =

Love & Hip Hop is a media franchise that consists of several reality television series broadcast on VH1. The shows document the personal and professional lives of several hip hop and R&B recording artists, music executives and record producers residing in various metropolitan areas of the United States. The original franchise version, Love & Hip Hop: New York, premiered on March 6, 2011. Its success resulted in spin-offs based in Atlanta, Hollywood, and Miami.

The series is known for its large ensemble cast. Many are notable figures in hip hop and R&B, who appear in the opening credits as leading cast members. The franchise is also known for launching the careers of previously unknown artists, most notably K. Michelle and Cardi B. Each incarnation of the franchise features a sprawling supporting cast, credited as "additional cast" or "featured" in the show's end credits. These secondary cast members appear in green screen confessional segments and (for the most part) have the same amount of screen time and storyline focus as the show's main cast members. Over the years, several supporting cast members have been upgraded to lead.

Several cast members have made crossover appearances on different incarnations throughout the show's history, most notably K. Michelle and Safaree Samuels, who both have had a starring role on Atlanta, New York and Hollywood. They are followed by Erica Mena and Yandy Smith-Harris, who have starred on both New York and Atlanta, and Joseline Hernandez, who has starred on both Atlanta and Miami.

The franchise's popularity has spawned the spin-off shows, Chrissy & Mr. Jones, K. Michelle: My Life, Stevie J & Joseline: Go Hollywood, Leave It to Stevie and Remy & Papoose: Meet the Mackies, as well as several television specials, an aftershow, a mobile game and an official podcast.

== Cast timeline ==
Main cast (receives star billing at some point in the series)
Secondary cast (appears in green screen confessional segments and in end credits alongside the main cast)
Guest cast (appears in a guest role, cameo appearance or archive footage)

First season	#	Cast member	Love & Hip Hop				Spin-offs						Ref
First season	#	Cast member	New York (2011–20)	Atlanta (2012–22)	Hollywood (2014–19)	Miami (2018–22)	Chrissy & Mr. Jones (2012–13)	K. Michelle: My Life (2014–17)	Stevie J & Joseline: Go Hollywood (2016)	Leave It to Stevie (2016–18)	Remy & Papoose: Meet the Mackies (2018)	Family Reunion: Love & Hip Hop Edition (2021–22)	Ref
Love & Hip Hop: New York; Season 1	1	Chrissy Lampkin	M	A (Note: Appears in archival footage in the Dirty Little Secrets special only.)			M					M	
Love & Hip Hop: New York; Season 1	2	Emily Bustamante	M				S						
Love & Hip Hop: New York; Season 1	3	Olivia Longott	M										
Love & Hip Hop: New York; Season 1	4	Somaya Reece	M		C		C						
Love & Hip Hop: New York; Season 1	5	Jim Jones	S	A			M					M	
Love & Hip Hop: New York; Season 1	6	Mashonda Tifrere	S										
Love & Hip Hop: New York; Season 1	7	Maurice Aguilar	S										
Love & Hip Hop: New York; Season 1	8	Nancy "Mama" Jones	S	G (Note: Appears in the Love & Hip Hop Awards: Most Certified special only.)			S					M	
Love & Hip Hop: New York; Season 1	9	Rich Dollaz	M	S								M	
Love & Hip Hop: New York; Season 2	10	Kimbella Vanderhee	M									M	
Love & Hip Hop: New York; Season 2	11	Yandy Smith	M								G	M	
Love & Hip Hop: New York; Season 2	12	Teairra Marí	S	G (Note: Appears only on an episode of Love & Hip Hop Atlanta: The After Party Live.)	M							M	
Love & Hip Hop: New York; Season 2	13	Erica Mena	M									M	
Love & Hip Hop: Atlanta; Season 1	14	Joseline Hernandez	G (Note: Appears in the Love & Hip Hop Live: The Wedding and The Love Edition specials only.)	M		M		G	M	A			
Love & Hip Hop: Atlanta; Season 1	15	Erica Dixon		M								M	
Love & Hip Hop: Atlanta; Season 1	16	Rasheeda	G	M								G (Note: Appears in the Love & Hip Hop: Secrets Unlocked specials only.)	
Love & Hip Hop: Atlanta; Season 1	17	K. Michelle	M					M	G				
Love & Hip Hop: Atlanta; Season 1	18	Karlie Redd	G	M	G			G				M	
Love & Hip Hop: Atlanta; Season 1	19	Mimi Faust	G (Note: Appears in The Love Edition special only.)	M					S			M	
Love & Hip Hop: Atlanta; Season 1	20	Stevie J	G	M					M			M	
Love & Hip Hop: Atlanta; Season 1	21	Lil Scrappy	G	M		S				S		M	
Love & Hip Hop: Atlanta; Season 1	22	Ariane Davis	G (Note: Appears in the Love & Hip Hop Live: The Wedding special only.)	S									
Love & Hip Hop: Atlanta; Season 1	23	Momma Dee	G	S		S				C		M	
Love & Hip Hop: Atlanta; Season 1	24	Kirk Frost	G	M								G	
Love & Hip Hop: Atlanta; Season 1	25	Shay Johnson		S		M						M	
Love & Hip Hop: Atlanta; Season 1	26	Benzino		S									
Chrissy & Mr. Jones; Season 1	27	Freddie Robinson Jr.	G				S						
Chrissy & Mr. Jones; Season 1	28	Talia Coles	G				S						
Chrissy & Mr. Jones; Season 1	29	Paulina					S						
Chrissy & Mr. Jones; Season 1	30	Tina Lauren					S						
Love & Hip Hop: New York; Season 3	31	Jen the Pen	M										
Love & Hip Hop: New York; Season 3	32	Raqi Thunda	M										
Love & Hip Hop: New York; Season 3	33	Winter Ramos	M										
Love & Hip Hop: New York; Season 3	34	Rashidah Ali	M										
Love & Hip Hop: New York; Season 3	35	Tahiry Jose	M										
Love & Hip Hop: New York; Season 3	36	Joe Budden	M										
Love & Hip Hop: New York; Season 3	37	Mendeecees Harris	S	M								M	
Love & Hip Hop: New York; Season 3	38	Consequence	S										
Love & Hip Hop: New York; Season 3	39	Lore'l	S										
Love & Hip Hop: New York; Season 3	40	Kaylin Garcia	S			G							
Love & Hip Hop: Atlanta; Season 2	41	Traci Steele		M									
Love & Hip Hop: Atlanta; Season 2	42	DJ Babey Drew		S									
Love & Hip Hop: New York; Season 4	43	Tara Wallace	M	G (Note: Appears in the specials Love & Hip Hop Awards: Most Certified and 40 Greatest Love & Hip Hop Moments: The Reboot only.)								M	
Love & Hip Hop: New York; Season 4	44	Erica Jean	M										
Love & Hip Hop: New York; Season 4	45	Amina Buddafly	M	G								M	
Love & Hip Hop: New York; Season 4	46	Peter Gunz	S									M	
Love & Hip Hop: New York; Season 4	47	Nya Lee	S										
Love & Hip Hop: New York; Season 4	48	Saigon	S										
Love & Hip Hop: New York; Season 4	49	Cyn Santana	M	C								M	
Chrissy & Mr. Jones; Season 2	50	Pudie Jones					S						
Chrissy & Mr. Jones; Season 2	51	Sassy Everett					S						
Chrissy & Mr. Jones; Season 2	52	Deb Antney		S			S						
Love & Hip Hop: Atlanta; Season 3	53	Tammy Rivera		M									
Love & Hip Hop: Atlanta; Season 3	54	Waka Flocka Flame		S									
Love & Hip Hop: Atlanta; Season 3	55	Bambi Benson	G	M								M	
Love & Hip Hop: Atlanta; Season 3	56	Nikko London		S									
Love & Hip Hop: Atlanta; Season 3	57	Yung Joc	G	M	G					S		M	
Love & Hip Hop: Atlanta; Season 3	58	Erica Pinkett		S									
Love & Hip Hop: Atlanta; Season 3	59	Kalenna Harper		S									
Love & Hip Hop: Atlanta; Season 3	60	Dawn Heflin		S		G							
Love & Hip Hop: Atlanta; Season 3	61	Althea Heart		S									
Love & Hip Hop: Atlanta; Season 3	62	Tony Vick		S									
Love & Hip Hop: Hollywood; Season 1													
Love & Hip Hop: Hollywood; Season 1	63	Moniece Slaughter	S		M								
Love & Hip Hop: Hollywood; Season 1	64	Apryl Jones			M							M	
Love & Hip Hop: Hollywood; Season 1	65	Hazel-E		G	M								
Love & Hip Hop: Hollywood; Season 1	66	Ray J	G	G (Note: Appears only on an episode of Love & Hip Hop Atlanta: The After Party Live, as well as the specials Love & Hip Hop Awards: Most Certified and 40 Greatest Love & Hip Hop Moments: The Reboot.)	M	S				S		M	
Love & Hip Hop: Hollywood; Season 1	67	Lil' Fizz	G	G	M	G						M	
Love & Hip Hop: Hollywood; Season 1	68	Omarion			M								
Love & Hip Hop: Hollywood; Season 1	69	Soulja Boy			M								
Love & Hip Hop: Hollywood; Season 1	70	Morgan Hardman			S								
Love & Hip Hop: Hollywood; Season 1	71	Nia Riley			S								
Love & Hip Hop: Hollywood; Season 1	72	Leslie Burrell			S								
Love & Hip Hop: Hollywood; Season 1	73	Amanda Secor			S								
Love & Hip Hop: Hollywood; Season 1	74	Nikki Mudarris	G	G	M					A		M	
Love & Hip Hop: Hollywood; Season 1	75	Yung Berg			S								
Love & Hip Hop: Hollywood; Season 1	76	Masika Kalysha			M								
Love & Hip Hop: Hollywood; Season 1	77	Yesi Ortiz			S								
Love & Hip Hop: Hollywood; Season 1	78	Sincere Show			S								
K. Michelle: My Life; Season 1													
K. Michelle: My Life; Season 1	79	Paris Phillips	G	G (Note: Appears in the 40 Greatest Love & Hip Hop Moments: The Reboot special only.)	S			S				M	
K. Michelle: My Life; Season 1	80	Jonathan Fernandez	S	G				S				M	
K. Michelle: My Life; Season 1	81	Nema Kamar						S					
K. Michelle: My Life; Season 1	82	Tracie Renee	G					S					
Love & Hip Hop: New York; Season 5													
Love & Hip Hop: New York; Season 5	83	Chrissy Monroe	M										
Love & Hip Hop: New York; Season 5	84	Diamond Strawberry	S										
Love & Hip Hop: New York; Season 5	85	Cisco Rosado	S		S							M	
Love & Hip Hop: New York; Season 5	86	Chink Santana	S										
Love & Hip Hop: New York; Season 5	87	Precious Paris	S										
Love & Hip Hop: New York; Season 5	88	Jhonni Blaze	S										
Love & Hip Hop: Atlanta; Season 4													
Love & Hip Hop: Atlanta; Season 4	89	Jessica Dime		M				G					
Love & Hip Hop: Atlanta; Season 4	90	Margeaux Simms		S									
Love & Hip Hop: Atlanta; Season 4	91	Ashley Nicole		S									
Love & Hip Hop: Atlanta; Season 4	92	Khadiyah Lewis		S									
Love & Hip Hop: Atlanta; Season 4	93	Sina Bina		S									
Love & Hip Hop: Atlanta; Season 4	94	Tiffany Foxx		S									
Love & Hip Hop: Atlanta; Season 4	95	Ernest Bryant		S									
Love & Hip Hop: Atlanta; Season 4	96	PreMadonna		S		M							
Love & Hip Hop: Hollywood; Season 2													
Love & Hip Hop: Hollywood; Season 2	97	Milan Christopher			S								
Love & Hip Hop: Hollywood; Season 2	98	Princess Love	G		M	S						G	
Love & Hip Hop: Hollywood; Season 2	99	Amber Laura			S								
Love & Hip Hop: Hollywood; Season 2	100	Miles Brock	G		S								
Love & Hip Hop: Hollywood; Season 2	101	Brandi Boyd			S								
Love & Hip Hop: Hollywood; Season 2	102	Nastassia Smith			S								
Love & Hip Hop: Hollywood; Season 2	103	Kamiah Adams			S								
Love & Hip Hop: Hollywood; Season 2	104	Max Lux			S								
Love & Hip Hop: Hollywood; Season 2	105	Jason Lee			S								
Love & Hip Hop: Hollywood; Season 2	106	Marla Thomas			S								
Love & Hip Hop: Hollywood; Season 2	107	Shanda Denyce			S								
Love & Hip Hop: Hollywood; Season 2	108	Willie Taylor			S								
Love & Hip Hop: New York; Season 6													
Love & Hip Hop: New York; Season 6	109	Cardi B	M	G									
Love & Hip Hop: New York; Season 6	110	Miss Moe Money	M										
Love & Hip Hop: New York; Season 6	111	Sexxy Lexxy	M										
Love & Hip Hop: New York; Season 6	112	Mariahlynn	M	G (Note: Appears only in the specials Joseline's Special Delivery, Love & Hip Hop Awards: Most Certified and 40 Greatest Love & Hip Hop Moments: The Reboot.)								M	
Love & Hip Hop: New York; Season 6	113	Remy Ma	M	G							M	G (Note: Appears in the Love & Hip Hop: It's A Love Thing special only.)	
Love & Hip Hop: New York; Season 6	114	Papoose	M								M	G	
Love & Hip Hop: New York; Season 6	115	Bianca Bonnie	M										
Love & Hip Hop: New York; Season 6	116	DJ Self	S				C						
Love & Hip Hop: New York; Season 6	117	Yorma Hernandez	S										
Love & Hip Hop: New York; Season 6	118	Rose	S										
Stevie J & Joseline: Go Hollywood; Season 1													
Stevie J & Joseline: Go Hollywood; Season 1	119	Stevie Jordan Jr.		G					S				
Stevie J & Joseline: Go Hollywood; Season 1	120	Sade Jordan		G					S				
Stevie J & Joseline: Go Hollywood; Season 1	121	Savannah Jordan		S					S				
K. Michelle: My Life; Season 2	122	P. London						S					
Love & Hip Hop: Atlanta; Season 5													
Love & Hip Hop: Atlanta; Season 5	123	Karen King		S								M	
Love & Hip Hop: Atlanta; Season 5	124	Scrapp DeLeon		M								M	
Love & Hip Hop: Atlanta; Season 5	125	Tommie Lee	G	M						S			
Love & Hip Hop: Atlanta; Season 5	126	Tiarra Becca		S									
Love & Hip Hop: Atlanta; Season 5	127	Chris Gould		S									
Love & Hip Hop: Atlanta; Season 5	128	D. Smith		S	G (Note: Appears in the Out in Hip Hop special only.)								
Love & Hip Hop: Atlanta; Season 5	129	Betty Idol		S									
Love & Hip Hop: Atlanta; Season 5	130	Lyfe Jennings		S									
Love & Hip Hop: Atlanta; Season 5	131	Kelsie Frost		S									
Love & Hip Hop: Atlanta; Season 5	132	Shirleen Harvell		S									
Love & Hip Hop: Atlanta; Season 5	133	Sas		S									
Love & Hip Hop: Atlanta; Season 5	134	J-Nicks		S									
Love & Hip Hop: Atlanta; Season 5	135	Amber Priddy		S									
Love & Hip Hop: Hollywood; Season 3													
Love & Hip Hop: Hollywood; Season 3	136	Sonja Norwood			S								
Love & Hip Hop: Hollywood; Season 3	137	Kyesha Shalina			S								
Love & Hip Hop: Hollywood; Season 3	138	Lyrica Anderson	G		M							M	
Love & Hip Hop: Hollywood; Season 3	139	A1 Bentley	G	G	M								
Love & Hip Hop: Hollywood; Season 3	140	Lyrica Garrett			S								
Love & Hip Hop: Hollywood; Season 3	141	Pam Bentley			S								
Love & Hip Hop: Hollywood; Season 3	142	Safaree Samuels	M					G		S	G	M	
Love & Hip Hop: Hollywood; Season 3	143	Rosa Acosta			S								
Love & Hip Hop: New York; Season 7													
Love & Hip Hop: New York; Season 7	144	Felicia "Snoop" Pearson	M		G								
Love & Hip Hop: New York; Season 7	145	Hennessy Carolina	S										
Love & Hip Hop: New York; Season 7	146	Samantha Wallace	S	G									
Love & Hip Hop: New York; Season 7	147	Juelz Santana	M										
Love & Hip Hop: New York; Season 7	148	J. Adrienne	S										
Love & Hip Hop: New York; Season 7	149	Swift Star	S										
Love & Hip Hop: New York; Season 7	150	DJ Drewski	S										
Love & Hip Hop: New York; Season 7	151	Sofi Green	S										
Love & Hip Hop: New York; Season 7	152	Sky Landish	S										
Love & Hip Hop: New York; Season 7	153	Kim Wallace	S										
Love & Hip Hop: New York; Season 7	154	Erika DeShazo	S										
Love & Hip Hop: New York; Season 7	155	Judy Harris	S									M	
Love & Hip Hop: New York; Season 7	156	Asia Davies	S										
Love & Hip Hop: New York; Season 7	157	Ashley Trowers	S										
Love & Hip Hop: New York; Season 7	158	Jade Wifey	S		S								
Love & Hip Hop: New York; Season 7	159	Juju C.	M			S					G		
Love & Hip Hop: New York; Season 7	160	Major Galore	S										
Leave It to Stevie; Season 1													
Leave It to Stevie; Season 1	161	Faith Evans		G					G	S			
Leave It to Stevie; Season 1	162	Renaye Diaz								S			
Leave It to Stevie; Season 1	163	Dalvin DeGrate			G					S			
Leave It to Stevie; Season 1	164	Eva Jordan		G					G	S			
Leave It to Stevie; Season 1	165	Alexis Branch								S			
K. Michelle: My Life; Season 3	166	Shalah Pate						S					
Love & Hip Hop: Atlanta; Season 6													
Love & Hip Hop: Atlanta; Season 6	167	Melissa Scott		S									
Love & Hip Hop: Atlanta; Season 6	168	Jasmine Washington		S									
Love & Hip Hop: Atlanta; Season 6	169	Rod Bullock		S									
Love & Hip Hop: Atlanta; Season 6	170	Keanna Arnold		S									
Love & Hip Hop: Atlanta; Season 6	171	Sierra Gates	G	M								M	
Love & Hip Hop: Atlanta; Season 6	171	Moriah Lee		S									
Love & Hip Hop: Atlanta; Season 6	172	Lovely Mimi		S									
Love & Hip Hop: Atlanta; Season 6	173	Tresure P.		S						C			
Love & Hip Hop: Atlanta; Season 6	174	Shooter Gates		S									
Love & Hip Hop: Atlanta; Season 6	175	Gunplay		S		M						M	
Love & Hip Hop: Atlanta; Season 6	176	Estelita Quintero		S								M	
Love & Hip Hop: Atlanta; Season 6	177	Samantha Lee		S									
Love & Hip Hop: Hollywood; Season 4													
Love & Hip Hop: Hollywood; Season 4	178	Keyshia Cole	G		M								
Love & Hip Hop: Hollywood; Season 4	179	Daniel "Booby" Gibson			S							M	
Love & Hip Hop: Hollywood; Season 4	180	Zellswag			S							M	
Love & Hip Hop: Hollywood; Season 4	181	Brooke Valentine			M							M	
Love & Hip Hop: Hollywood; Season 4	182	Marcus Black			S							M	
Love & Hip Hop: Hollywood; Season 4	183	Alexis Skyy	S									M	
Love & Hip Hop: Hollywood; Season 4	184	Chanel West Coast			S								
Love & Hip Hop: Hollywood; Season 4	185	Solo Lucci	G		S								
Love & Hip Hop: Hollywood; Season 4	186	A.D. Diggs			S								
Love & Hip Hop: Hollywood; Season 4	187	Misster Ray		G	S								
Love & Hip Hop: Hollywood; Season 4	188	Bridget Kelly			S								
Love & Hip Hop: Hollywood; Season 4	189	James Shipp Jr.			S								
Love & Hip Hop: Hollywood; Season 4	190	Tiffany Campbell			S								
Love & Hip Hop: New York; Season 8													
Love & Hip Hop: New York; Season 8	191	Anaís	M										
Love & Hip Hop: New York; Season 8	192	Lil' Mo	M										
Love & Hip Hop: New York; Season 8	193	Navarro Gray	S										
Love & Hip Hop: New York; Season 8	194	Brittney Taylor	S										
Love & Hip Hop: New York; Season 8	195	Jaquáe	S								G		
Love & Hip Hop: New York; Season 8	196	James R.	S										
Love & Hip Hop: New York; Season 8	197	Ashley Diaz	S										
Love & Hip Hop: New York; Season 8	198	DreamDoll	S										
Love & Hip Hop: New York; Season 8	199	Sophia Body	S										
Love & Hip Hop: New York; Season 8	200	Karl Dargan	S										
Love & Hip Hop: New York; Season 8	201	Grafh	S										
Love & Hip Hop: New York; Season 8	202	Ayisha Diaz	S										
Love & Hip Hop: New York; Season 8	203	Trent Crews	S										
Love & Hip Hop: New York; Season 8	204	Kiyanne	S										
Love & Hip Hop: Miami; Season 1													
Love & Hip Hop: Miami; Season 1	205	Trina	G	G (Note: Appears only on an episode of Love & Hip Hop Atlanta: The After Party Live, as well as the special 40 Greatest Love & Hip Hop Moments: The Reboot.)		M						M	
Love & Hip Hop: Miami; Season 1	206	Prince				M							
Love & Hip Hop: Miami; Season 1	207	Amara La Negra		G	G	M				G		M	
Love & Hip Hop: Miami; Season 1	208	Veronica Vega				M							
Love & Hip Hop: Miami; Season 1	209	Bobby Lytes		G		M						M	
Love & Hip Hop: Miami; Season 1	210	Trick Daddy		G		M						M	
Love & Hip Hop: Miami; Season 1	211	Young Hollywood				S							
Love & Hip Hop: Miami; Season 1	212	Mami Ana				S						G	
Love & Hip Hop: Miami; Season 1	213	Keyara Stone				S							
Love & Hip Hop: Miami; Season 1	214	Pleasure P				S							
Love & Hip Hop: Miami; Season 1	215	Miami Tip				S						M	
Love & Hip Hop: Miami; Season 1	216	Joy Young				S						M	
Love & Hip Hop: Miami; Season 1	217	Gabby Davis				S							
Love & Hip Hop: Miami; Season 1	218	Jeffrey White				S							
Love & Hip Hop: Miami; Season 1	219	Michelle Pooch				S							
Love & Hip Hop: Miami; Season 1	220	Malik Williams				S							
Love & Hip Hop: Miami; Season 1	221	Jojo Zarur				M							
Love & Hip Hop: Miami; Season 1	222	Liz Cifuentes				S							
Love & Hip Hop: Miami; Season 1	223	Steph Lecor				S							
Love & Hip Hop: Miami; Season 1	224	Chinese Nicky				S							
Love & Hip Hop: Miami; Season 1	225	Chinese Kitty				S							
Love & Hip Hop: Miami; Season 1	226	Faride Nemer				S							
Love & Hip Hop: Miami; Season 1	227	Baby Blue Whoaaaa				S							
Love & Hip Hop: Atlanta; Season 7													
Love & Hip Hop: Atlanta; Season 7	228	Spice		M		G						M	
Love & Hip Hop: Atlanta; Season 7	229	BK Brasco		S									
Love & Hip Hop: Atlanta; Season 7	230	Tokyo Vanity		S									
Love & Hip Hop: Atlanta; Season 7	231	Tabius Tate		S									
Love & Hip Hop: Atlanta; Season 7	232	Keely Hill		S									
Love & Hip Hop: Atlanta; Season 7	233	Just Brittany		S						C			
Love & Hip Hop: Atlanta; Season 7	234	Shawne Williams		S									
Love & Hip Hop: Atlanta; Season 7	235	K. Botchey		S									
Love & Hip Hop: Atlanta; Season 7	236	Sean Garrett		S									
Leave It to Stevie; Season 2	237	Dorian Jordan		G					G	S			
Love & Hip Hop: Hollywood; Season 5													
Love & Hip Hop: Hollywood; Season 5	238	Apple Watts			S								
Love & Hip Hop: Hollywood; Season 5	239	Donatella			S								
Love & Hip Hop: Hollywood; Season 5	240	RoccStar			S								
Love & Hip Hop: Hollywood; Season 5	241	La'Britney			S								
Love & Hip Hop: Hollywood; Season 5	242	JayWill			S								
Love & Hip Hop: Hollywood; Season 5	243	Amber Diamond			S								
Love & Hip Hop: Hollywood; Season 5	244	Shun Love			S								
Love & Hip Hop: Hollywood; Season 5	245	John Watts			S								
Remy & Papoose: Meet the Mackies; Season 1													
Remy & Papoose: Meet the Mackies; Season 1	246	Shamele Mackie	G (Note: Appears in the Remy & Papoose: A Merry Mackie Holiday special only.)								S		
Remy & Papoose: Meet the Mackies; Season 1	247	Dejay Mackie	G								S		
Remy & Papoose: Meet the Mackies; Season 1	248	Jace Smith	G								S		
Love & Hip Hop: New York; Season 9													
Love & Hip Hop: New York; Season 9	249	Maino	S								G		
Love & Hip Hop: New York; Season 9	250	Sidney Starr	S										
Love & Hip Hop: New York; Season 9	251	Maggie Carrie	S										
Love & Hip Hop: Miami; Season 2													
Love & Hip Hop: Miami; Season 2	252	Jessie Woo				S							
Love & Hip Hop: Miami; Season 2	253	Spectacular			G	S							
Love & Hip Hop: Miami; Season 2	254	Khaotic				S							
Love & Hip Hop: Atlanta; Season 8													
Love & Hip Hop: Atlanta; Season 8	255	Pooh Hicks		S									
Love & Hip Hop: Atlanta; Season 8	256	Che Mack		S									
Love & Hip Hop: Atlanta; Season 8	257	Shekinah Anderson		S								M	
Love & Hip Hop: Atlanta; Season 8	258	Akbar V		S									
Love & Hip Hop: Atlanta; Season 8	259	Cee Cee		S									
Love & Hip Hop: Atlanta; Season 8	260	Kendra Robinson		M								G (Note: Appears in the Love & Hip Hop: Secrets Unlocked and Love & Hip Hop: It's a Love Thing specials only.)	
Love & Hip Hop: Atlanta; Season 8	261	Sharonda Official		S									
Love & Hip Hop: Hollywood; Season 6													
Love & Hip Hop: Hollywood; Season 6	262	J-Boog			S								
Love & Hip Hop: Hollywood; Season 6	263	Brittany B.		G	S								
Love & Hip Hop: Hollywood; Season 6	264	Yo-Yo			M							M	
Love & Hip Hop: Hollywood; Season 6	265	Micky Munday			S								
Love & Hip Hop: Hollywood; Season 6	266	Tricia Ana			S								
Love & Hip Hop: New York; Season 10													
Love & Hip Hop: New York; Season 10	267	Phresher	S										
Love & Hip Hop: New York; Season 10	268	Jennaske	S										
Love & Hip Hop: New York; Season 10	269	Jenn Coreano	S										
Love & Hip Hop: Miami; Season 3													
Love & Hip Hop: Miami; Season 3	270	Hood Brat				M							
Love & Hip Hop: Miami; Season 3	271	Sukihana				M						M	
Love & Hip Hop: Miami; Season 3	272	Brisco				M							
Love & Hip Hop: Miami; Season 3	273	Nikki Natural				S							
Love & Hip Hop: Miami; Season 3	274	Emjay Johnson				S						M	
Love & Hip Hop: Atlanta; Season 9													
Love & Hip Hop: Atlanta; Season 9	275	LightSkinKeisha		S									
Love & Hip Hop: Atlanta; Season 9	276	Ki'yomi Leslie		S									
Love & Hip Hop: Atlanta; Season 9	277	Cheyenne Robinson		S									
Family Reunion: Love & Hip Hop Edition; Season 1													
Family Reunion: Love & Hip Hop Edition; Season 1	278	Jasmine Ellis		S								S	
Family Reunion: Love & Hip Hop Edition; Season 1	279	Jayden Young				G						S	
Family Reunion: Love & Hip Hop Edition; Season 1	280	Amoni Robinson		S								S	
Love & Hip Hop: Atlanta; Season 10													
Love & Hip Hop: Atlanta; Season 10	281	Yung Baby Tate		M									
Love & Hip Hop: Atlanta; Season 10	282	Omeretta the Great		M									
Love & Hip Hop: Atlanta; Season 10	283	Ky Frost		S									
Love & Hip Hop: Atlanta; Season 10	284	Infinity Gilyard	G	S									
Love & Hip Hop: Atlanta; Season 10	285	Renni Rucci		S									
Love & Hip Hop: Atlanta; Season 10	286	Eric Whitehead		S									
Love & Hip Hop: Atlanta; Season 10	287	Justin Budd		S									
Love & Hip Hop: Atlanta; Season 10	288	Meda Montana		S									
Love & Hip Hop: Atlanta; Season 10	289	Lil Mendeecees	G	S									
Love & Hip Hop: Miami; Season 4													
Love & Hip Hop: Miami; Season 4	290	Florence El Luche				M							
Love & Hip Hop: Miami; Season 4	291	Ace Hood				M							
Love & Hip Hop: Miami; Season 4	292	Shelah Marie				M							
Love & Hip Hop: Miami; Season 4	293	Noreaga	G			M							
Love & Hip Hop: Miami; Season 4	294	Neri Santiago				M							
Love & Hip Hop: Miami; Season 4	295	Gaelle Jacques				S							
Love & Hip Hop: Miami; Season 4	296	Kill Bill				S							
Love & Hip Hop: Miami; Season 4	297	Raymond Taylor				S							
Love & Hip Hop: Miami; Season 4	298	C.O. Piscapo				S							
Love & Hip Hop: Miami; Season 4	299	Marlon Dure				S							
Love & Hip Hop: Miami; Season 4	300	Isaiah Henderson				S							
Love & Hip Hop: Miami; Season 4	301	One Snoop Monzta				S							
Love & Hip Hop: Miami; Season 4	302	Jay Kelly				S							
Love & Hip Hop: Miami; Season 4	303	Jullian Boothe				S							
Love & Hip Hop: Miami; Season 4	304	Sandra Sims				S							

== Related shows ==
- The VH1 reality shows The Gossip Game and This Is Hot 97, also produced by Monami Entertainment, were listed as spin-offs of Love & Hip Hop in a Complex profile of Mona Scott-Young, however they have never officially been considered as part of the franchise.
- Joe Budden and Kaylin Garcia joined the cast of the sixth season of the VH1 show Couples Therapy, which premiered October 7, 2015.
- Jim Jones and Chrissy Lampkin starred on the WE TV show Jim & Chrissy: Vow or Never, which premiered September 1, 2016. Nancy "Mama" Jones would appear in a supporting role.
- Ray J, Princess Love, Cardi B, Stevie J, DreamDoll, Karlie Redd, Lil' Fizz, Yandy Smith, Mimi Faust, Safaree Samuels, Yung Joc, Jessica Dime, Remy Ma, Joseline Hernandez, Joe Budden, Trina, Papoose, Cyn Santana, Erica Mena and Nikki Mudarris have appeared on the VH1 game show Hip Hop Squares, which premiered March 13, 2017.
- Deb Antney is part of the cast of the WE TV show Growing Up Hip Hop: Atlanta, which premiered May 25, 2017. Jhonni Blaze and Masika Kalysha joined the cast in season two.
- Erica Mena, Yung Joc, Nikki Mudarris and Safaree Samuels were contestants on the VH1 reality competition show Scared Famous, which premiered October 23, 2017.
- Benzino, Althea Heart, Nikko London, Margeaux Simms, PreMadonna, Peter Gunz, Amina Buddafly, Tara Wallace, Jim Jones, Chrissy Lampkin, Nancy "Mama" Jones, Momma Dee and Ernest Bryant have all appeared on various incarnations of WE TV's Marriage Boot Camp: Reality Stars franchise. On December 7, 2018, WE TV announced Marriage Boot Camp: Hip Hop Edition, which will premiere in January 2019 and will exclusively feature cast members from Love & Hip Hop. The show's cast includes Waka Flocka Flame and Tammy Rivera, Soulja Boy and Nia Riley, Jessica Dime and Shawne Williams, Lil' Mo and Karl Dargan and Lil' Fizz and Tiffany Campbell.
