= Love & Hip Hop: New York season 4 =

Love & Hip Hop: New York
- Season 4
- DVD cover
- Starring: Yandy Smith; Tara Wallace; Erica Mena; Erica Jean; Tahiry Jose; Amina Buddafly; K. Michelle
- No. of episodes: 14

Release
- Original network: VH1
- Original release: October 28, 2013 – February 10, 2014

Season chronology
- ← Previous; Season 3 Next → Season 5

The fourth season of the reality television series Love & Hip Hop: New York aired on VH1 from October 28, 2013 until February 10, 2014. The season was primarily filmed in New York City, New York. It was executively produced by Mona Scott-Young for Monami Entertainment, Toby Barraud and Stefan Springman for Eastern TV, and Shelly Tatro, Brad Abramson and Danielle Gelfand for VH1.

The series chronicles the lives of several women and men in the New York area, involved in hip hop music. It consists of 14 episodes, including a two-part reunion special hosted by Mo'Nique.

== Production ==
On October 10, 2013, VH1 announced Love & Hip Hop would be returning for a fourth season on October 28, 2013. The season would premiere back to back with the second season of the spin-off series Chrissy & Mr. Jones. The season was preceded by 40 Greatest Love & Hip Hop Moments, a 2 hour clip show hosted by Mona Scott-Young. The special aired on October 24, 2013, and showcased the franchise's most "shocking, scandalous and dramatic Love & Hip Hop moments", featuring clips from the show's first three seasons, as well as the first two seasons of its spin-off Love & Hip Hop: Atlanta.

The cast was once again retooled, with only Yandy Smith, Erica Mena and Tahiry Jose returning from last season's main cast. They were joined by Peter Gunz' girlfriend Tara Wallace, Amina Buddafly, Saigon's baby mama Erica Jean and former Love & Hip Hop: Atlanta cast member K. Michelle. Peter Gunz joined the supporting cast, along with stripper Nya Lee, Saigon and Erica's girlfriend Cyn Santana. Former main cast member Rashidah Ali appeared as a guest star in several episodes.

The season was released on DVD on region 1 on January 25, 2015.

K. Michelle's purpose on the show was mainly served to set up her own spin-off series, as such, she appeared in infrequently and barely interacted with the rest of the cast. Her future co-stars on the show, Paris Phillips and Tracie Renee, appeared as guest stars. On October 15, 2014, VH1 officially announced K. Michelle: My Life, which premiered on November 3, 2014.

== Synopsis ==
New York, a city filled with ambition. Here, everyone struggles to get what they want. Some just want to hold on to what they have, while others want it all. For some, its about winning trust without losing yourself. And in the game of love, you have to be willing to lose it all. But love just like life can sometimes be unfair. Some are looking for a second chance while others just want a fresh start. And even when you find what you're looking for, it can all be lost in the blink of an eye. Cause things are never what they seem, in love and hip hop.

— Mona Scott-Young, opening monologue

Rapper Peter Gunz finds himself in a twisted love triangle as he juggles his relationships with long-time girlfriend Tara and artist Amina. Tahiry struggles to trust Joe, even as he contemplates taking their relationship to the next level. Erica Mena has unfinished business with Rich, but finds herself falling in love with a woman. Yandy is trying to adjust to life with her man locked up awaiting sentencing. Rapper Saigon and his ex Erica Jean clash violently as they struggle to co-parent their new son. K. Michelle has come to New York for a fresh start.

=== Reception ===
The season's ratings improved significantly from last season's lackluster efforts, up 54% over last season's average and attracting an average of 3 million total viewers per episode.

== Cast ==
=== Starring ===
- Yandy Smith (14 episodes)
- Tara Wallace (14 episodes)
- Erica Mena^{1} (14 episodes)
- Erica Jean^{2} (10 episodes)
- Tahiry Jose (13 episodes)
- Amina Buddafly (13 episodes)
- K. Michelle (8 episodes)

Note:

1. Credited onscreen as "Erica M.".
2. Credited onscreen as "Erica J.".

=== Also starring ===
- Peter Gunz (14 episodes)
- Rich Dollaz (14 episodes)
- Joe Budden (11 episodes)
- Nya Lee (6 episodes)
- Saigon (10 episodes)
- Cyn Santana (11 episodes)

Rashidah Ali returns in a guest role. Paris Phillips, Tahiry's sister Lexie Jose, Joe's mother Fay Southerland and Tahiry's sister Ginny Jose appear in several episodes as guest stars. Mendeecees Harris appears via phone call conversations with Yandy, as he was incarcerated during filming. The show also features minor appearances from notable figures within the hip hop industry and the cast's inner circle, including Cory Gunz, Stephen Marley, Yandy's father Ralph Smith, Yandy's artist J. Dinero, Wyclef Jean, Amina's sister Sophie Schmahl, Erica Mena's friend Albee Yours, Rich's mother Jewel Escobar and Nick Cannon.

== Episodes ==
No. overall	No. in season	Title	Original release date	US viewers (millions)
35	1	"Everybody Plays The Fool"	October 28, 2013	2.99
Yandy struggles to deal with the loss of her man. Rich and Erica put a line in the sand. Joe and Tahiry await life changing news. Peter's new artist Amina has a shocking reveal. Tara, Erica J., Amina and K. Michelle are added to the opening credits, replacing departing cast members Jen, Raqi, Winter and Rashidah, who returns as a guest star. Peter Gunz joins the supporting cast. Erica J. and Saigon appear in the opening monologue sequence only.
36	2	"Stray Bullet"	November 4, 2013	2.94
Peter races to stop a misfire. Erica Jean and Saigon reconnect for a second chance at love. Erica Mena and Nya get down to business. Nya Lee and Saigon join the supporting cast.
37	3	"Lez B Honest"	November 11, 2013	3.36
Erica Mena doubles down on her new lifestyle while blowing up her arrangement with Nya. Peter's affair is exposed when Tara finally confronts Amina. Joe and Tahiry's relationship takes a hairy turn. Yandy's label gets messy. Although credited, K. Michelle does not appear.
38	4	"Picture This"	November 18, 2013	3.05
Saigon and Erica Jean find out the real father of their child. Erica Mena unleashes her new girlfriend on Rich. Tahiry comes to a painful conclusion about Joe. Tara tries to cut Peter out of her life. Although credited, K. Michelle does not appear.
39	5	"Off the Record"	November 25, 2013	3.18
Rich and Yandy decide Amina's fate as Yandy struggles to manage her career and fight for her man. Saigon and Erica Jean stand-off over their son. Cyn and Nya arrange a reunion. Peter finally takes a stand. Although credited, Tahiry and K. Michelle do not appear.
40	6	"Wife Swap"	December 2, 2013	2.95
Rich makes a proposal to Peter. K. Michelle takes control of her tour. Tahiry's sister reconnects bringing tragic news. An exhausted Yandy confronts her business partner. Erica Mena realizes signing her contract might have been a huge mistake. Although credited, Erica J. does not appear.
41	7	"Messy All Over the World"	December 9, 2013	2.95
Erica Mena and Cyn find love in Panama. Peter delivers an ultimatum to Rich. Tahiry rejects Lexie's plan to help their dad. Yandy receives an important message from Mendeecees in prison. Tara confronts Peter about his rings of deception.
42	8	"Girls With Gunz"	December 30, 2013	2.38
A chance meeting between Tahiry and Joe threatens to rekindle their relationship. Buried emotions get the best of Erica Mena and Rich. New talent teaches Yandy a tough lesson. K. Michelle leads Tara into a confrontation with Peter and Amina. Although credited, Erica J. does not appear.
43	9	"Love Is a Battlefield"	January 6, 2014	2.88
Joe and Tahiry's destiny continues to intertwine. K. Michelle pushes Peter to reconcile with Amina as Tara takes steps to move on. Saigon makes a brash move. Erica Mena's love triangle explodes.
44	10	"Red Alert"	January 13, 2014	3.11
Tahiry and Rashidah clash. Erica Mena and a new rival fight for territory. Joe decides to stake his claim as Tara and K. Michelle take the plunge on a double date. Rich finally admits his love. Although credited, Amina and Erica J. do not appear.
45	11	"Put a Ring on It"	January 20, 2014	3.44
Joe proposes to Tahiry in Times Square. Rich confronts Erica Mena and Cyn in the studio. Saigon and Erica Jean get a blessing. Peter and Amina have a kid crisis. Yandy stays strong. Tara calls it quits. Although credited, K. Michelle does not appear.
46	12	"All Good Things..."	January 27, 2014	3.05
Worlds collide at Erica Mena's performance as Rich reveals the final truth to Cyn. Nick Cannon convinces Peter to seal the deal. Yandy and Mendecees plot their future. Tahiry and Rashidah meet for their final battle. Cyn joins the supporting cast.
47	13	"Reunion – Part 1"	February 3, 2014	3.15
The cast reunites and get to the bottom of this season's messy love triangles and relationships. Drama ensues with shocking reveals and explosive words, both on and off stage. host: Mo'Nique
48	14	"Reunion – Part 2"	February 10, 2014	3.51
The reunion picks up right where it left off and starts with a shocking reveal. host: Mo'Nique

== Webisodes ==
=== Check Yourself ===
Love & Hip Hop New York: Check Yourself, which features the cast's reactions to each episode, was released weekly with every episode on digital platforms.

=== Bonus scenes ===
Deleted scenes from the season's episodes were released weekly as bonus content on VH1's official website.

== Music ==
Several cast members had their music featured on the show and released singles to coincide with the airing of the episodes.

List of songs performed and/or featured in Love & Hip Hop: New York season four
Title	Performer	Album	Episode(s)	Notes	Ref
What It Feels Like	Amina Buddafly	I Am, Pt. 2	1	performed onstage	
Can U	Amina Buddafly	I Am, Pt. 2	1	performed in studio session	
Best I've Ever Had	Amina Buddafly	I Am, Pt. 2	1	performed onstage	
NY Money (feat. Jadakiss)	Nya Lee	single	2	featured in music video shoot	
Since You Been Gone (feat. Peter Gunz)	Amina Buddafly	I Am, Pt. 2	2	performed acoustically	
Do Something	Cory Gunz	Datz WTF I'm Tallkin' Bout	2	played in studio session	
We Got Us	Amina Buddafly	I Am, Pt. 2	5	performed in studio session	
Don't Wanna Be Right (feat. Peter Gunz)	Amina Buddafly	I Am, Pt. 2	6, 13	performed acoustically performed at reunion	
Best Mistake (feat. G. Martin)	Saigon	G.S.N.T. 3: The Troubled Times of Brian Carenard	7	performed in studio session	
Dancin' All Over the World	Erica Mena	single	8, 9, 10, 12	performed in studio session and onstage	
Be With Me	J. Dinero	single	8	performed in studio session	
Can't Raise a Man	K. Michelle	Rebellious Soul	12	performed in rehearsal space and onstage background music	
