= List of Love & Hip Hop: New York episodes =

Love & Hip Hop: New York (originally known as simply Love & Hip Hop) is the original installment of the Love & Hip Hop reality television franchise on VH1. The series premiered on March 6, 2011, and chronicles the lives of several people in New York City (and nearby areas, including New Jersey, and Yonkers), involved with hip hop music.

== Series overview ==
Season	Episodes	Originally released	
Season	Episodes	First released	Last released
1	9	March 6, 2011	May 16, 2011
2	11	November 14, 2011	February 6, 2012
3	14	January 7, 2013	April 15, 2013
4	14	October 28, 2013	February 10, 2014
5	17	December 15, 2014	April 13, 2015
6	14	December 14, 2015	March 28, 2016
7	16	November 21, 2016	February 27, 2017
8	18	October 30, 2017	March 12, 2018
9	16	November 26, 2018	March 18, 2019
10	14	December 16, 2019	March 9, 2020

== Episodes ==
=== Season 1 (2011) ===
No. overall	No. in season	Title	Original release date	US viewers (millions)
1	1	"Love & Hip Hop"	March 6, 2011	1.93
2	2	"Birthday"	March 21, 2011	0.81
3	3	"The Yacht"	March 28, 2011	0.68
4	4	"Aftermath"	April 4, 2011	0.73
5	5	"A Voice"	April 11, 2011	0.89
6	6	"Proposal"	April 18, 2011	0.69
7	7	"Hold You Down"	April 25, 2011	1.18
8	8	"Me Against the Joneses"	May 2, 2011	0.80
9	9	"Reunion"	May 16, 2011	1.26

=== Season 2 (2011–12) ===
No. overall	No. in season	Title	Original release date	US viewers (millions)
10	1	"Still Look Pretty"	November 14, 2011	2.56
11	2	"Bitch, I'm Fuego"	November 21, 2011	2.78
12	3	"A Toast To Kimbella"	November 28, 2011	2.92
13	4	"Fizzy-chotic"	December 5, 2011	2.38
14	5	"Emily's 'Fabolous' Life"	December 12, 2011	2.28
15	6	"Bottle Service"	December 26, 2011	2.70
16	7	"These Are The Breaks"	January 2, 2012	2.81
17	8	"Miami Vice"	January 9, 2012	3.41
18	9	"Back To Reality"	January 16, 2012	3.03
19	10	"At The End of the Day"	January 23, 2012	3.14
20	11	"Reality Check"	February 6, 2012	2.30

=== Season 3 (2013) ===
No. overall	No. in season	Title	Original release date	US viewers (millions)
21	1	"The Whole Truth and Nothing But The Truth..."	January 7, 2013	2.59
22	2	"Raq and a Hard Place"	January 14, 2013	2.20
23	3	"Family Matters"	January 21, 2013	1.93
24	4	"Life Support"	January 28, 2013	2.19
25	5	"Can't Take the Heat"	February 4, 2013	1.92
26	6	"Ain't Always About the Dollaz"	February 18, 2013	1.88
27	7	"Burn After Reading"	February 25, 2013	1.81
28	8	"Closing the Book"	March 4, 2013	1.81
29	9	"Redemption Song"	March 11, 2013	1.62
30	10	"Do the Right Thing"	March 18, 2013	1.51
31	11	"With or Without You?"	March 25, 2013	1.75
32	12	"One Day at a Time"	April 1, 2013	1.78
33	13	"Reunion – Part 1"	April 8, 2013	1.80
34	14	"Reunion – Part 2"	April 15, 2013	2.35

=== Season 4 (2013–14) ===
No. overall	No. in season	Title	Original release date	US viewers (millions)
35	1	"Everybody Plays The Fool"	October 28, 2013	2.99
36	2	"Stray Bullet"	November 4, 2013	2.94
37	3	"Lez B Honest"	November 11, 2013	3.36
38	4	"Picture This"	November 18, 2013	3.05
39	5	"Off the Record"	November 25, 2013	3.18
40	6	"Wife Swap"	December 2, 2013	2.95
41	7	"Messy All Over the World"	December 9, 2013	2.95
42	8	"Girls With Gunz"	December 30, 2013	2.38
43	9	"Love Is a Battlefield"	January 6, 2014	2.88
44	10	"Red Alert"	January 13, 2014	3.11
45	11	"Put a Ring on It"	January 20, 2014	3.44
46	12	"All Good Things..."	January 27, 2014	3.05
47	13	"Reunion – Part 1"	February 3, 2014	3.15
48	14	"Reunion – Part 2"	February 10, 2014	3.51

=== Season 5 (2014–15) ===
No. overall	No. in season	Title	Original release date	US viewers (millions)
49	1	"Bride and Prejudice"	December 15, 2014	2.48
50	2	"You're Canceled"	December 22, 2014	2.17
51	3	"A Lie for a Lie"	January 5, 2015	2.66
52	4	"A Woman Scorned"	January 12, 2015	2.49
53	5	"Oh Baby!"	January 19, 2015	2.38
54	6	"Exes and Ohs"	January 26, 2015	2.82
55	7	"Mama Drama"	February 2, 2015	2.58
56	8	"Worlds Collide"	February 9, 2015	2.54
57	9	"Call Your Bluff"	February 16, 2015	2.63
58	10	"Regrets Only"	February 23, 2015	2.56
59	11	"You Again?"	March 2, 2015	2.48
60	12	"Mind Your Manners"	March 9, 2015	2.49
61	13	"All Heart"	March 16, 2015	2.20
62	14	"The Final Countdown"	March 23, 2015	2.53
63	15	"Surprise, Surprise"	March 30, 2015	2.13
64	16	"Reunion – Part 1"	April 6, 2015	2.37
65	17	"Reunion – Part 2"	April 13, 2015	2.28

=== Season 6 (2015–16) ===
No. overall	No. in season	Title	Original release date	US viewers (millions)
66	1	"The Crown"	December 14, 2015	2.67
67	2	"Secrets and Lies"	December 21, 2015	2.28
68	3	"What's Poppin"	December 28, 2015	2.68
69	4	"The Bald and the Beautiful"	January 4, 2016	2.72
70	5	"Endings & Beginnings"	January 11, 2016	2.60
71	6	"Fallout"	January 18, 2016	2.76
72	7	"Ups & Downs"	January 25, 2016	2.77
73	8	"The Long Game"	February 1, 2016	2.63
74	9	"Love & War"	February 8, 2016	2.59
75	10	"Showcase Showdown"	February 22, 2016	2.49
76	11	"The Wait Is Over"	February 29, 2016	2.48
77	12	"Love Conquers All"	March 7, 2016	2.26
78	13	"Reunion – Part 1"	March 21, 2016	2.41
79	14	"Reunion – Part 2"	March 28, 2016	2.58

=== Season 7 (2016–17) ===
No. overall	No. in season	Title	Original release date	US viewers (millions)
80	1	"All The Way Up"	November 21, 2016	2.35
81	2	"Strawberries"	November 28, 2016	2.48
82	3	"Chest Pains"	December 5, 2016	2.17
83	4	"Get It Poppin"	December 12, 2016	2.28
84	5	"Past and Present"	December 12, 2016	2.54
85	6	"Lock and Key"	December 19, 2016	2.29
86	7	"Secret's Out"	December 26, 2016	2.28
87	8	"Firing Squad"	January 2, 2017	2.61
88	9	"Coo Coo for Koko"	January 9, 2017	2.18
89	10	"Don't Mess with the Exes"	January 16, 2017	2.49
90	11	"Creepin' Back"	January 23, 2017	2.71
91	12	"Cancun – Part 1"	January 30, 2017	2.38
92	13	"Cancun – Part 2"	February 6, 2017	2.33
93	14	"The Sit-Down"	February 13, 2017	2.27
94	15	"Reunion – Part 1"	February 20, 2017	2.51
95	16	"Reunion – Part 2"	February 27, 2017	2.63

=== Season 8 (2017–18) ===
No. overall	No. in season	Title	Original release date	US viewers (millions)
96	1	"Unity"	October 30, 2017	2.21
97	2	"Rubbed the Wrong Way"	November 6, 2017	1.98
98	3	"Bodied"	November 13, 2017	1.89
99	4	"Reckless"	November 20, 2017	1.82
100	5	"Streets Are Talking"	November 27, 2017	1.80
101	6	"Puppy Love"	December 4, 2017	1.81
102	7	"Slippin'"	December 11, 2017	1.84
103	8	"Catfished"	December 18, 2017	1.51
104	9	"Bad Reputation"	December 25, 2017	1.10
105	10	"Single No Mingle"	January 1, 2018	1.84
106	11	"Gram in Your Hand"	January 8, 2018	1.86
107	12	"Peace Talk"	January 22, 2018	1.84
108	13	"St. Maarten – Part 1"	January 29, 2018	1.84
109	14	"St. Maarten – Part 2"	February 5, 2018	1.97
110	15	"Remix"	February 19, 2018	1.95
111	16	"Mix-Up"	February 26, 2018	1.79
112	17	"Reunion – Part 1"	March 5, 2018	1.81
113	18	"Reunion – Part 2"	March 12, 2018	1.73

=== Season 9 (2018–19) ===
No. overall	No. in season	Title	Original release date	U.S. viewers (millions)
114	1	"Arrested Development"	November 26, 2018	1.85
115	2	"The Blame Game"	December 3, 2018	1.61
116	3	"Pleas and Thank You"	December 10, 2018	1.60
117	4	"Triggers"	December 17, 2018	1.48
118	5	"Gwinners & Losers"	December 24, 2018	0.90
119	6	"Own Your Truth"	January 7, 2019	1.33
120	7	"Hard Choices"	January 14, 2019	1.45
121	8	"Collateral Damage"	January 21, 2019	1.44
122	9	"Sour Grapes"	January 28, 2019	1.34
123	10	"Crease the Timbs"	February 4, 2019	1.34
124	11	"Why You Trippin'?"	February 11, 2019	1.33
125	12	"Pura Vida"	February 18, 2019	1.43
126	13	"Zip It"	February 25, 2019	1.26
127	14	"Locked Down"	March 4, 2019	1.28
128	15	"Reunion – Part 1"	March 11, 2019	1.36
129	16	"Reunion – Part 2"	March 18, 2019	1.63

=== Season 10 (2019–20) ===
No. overall	No. in season	Title	Original release date	U.S. viewers (millions)
130	1	"Homecoming"	December 16, 2019	1.47
131	2	"Messy Boots"	December 16, 2019	1.41
132	3	"Keeping Up With the Joneses"	December 23, 2019	1.13
133	4	"Some Sticky Big Bizness"	December 30, 2019	1.22
134	5	"Ex’s & Oh’s"	January 6, 2020	1.43
135	6	"Between a Rock and a Hard Place"	January 13, 2020	1.27
136	7	"Happily Mena After"	January 20, 2020	1.28
137	8	"Whose Birthday Is It Anyway?"	January 27, 2020	1.32
138	9	"December to Remember"	February 3, 2020	1.26
139	10	"Lingerie Goes Left"	February 10, 2020	1.22
140	11	"Spirituali-Tea"	February 17, 2020	1.17
141	12	"Straitt Outta Brooklyn"	February 24, 2020	1.12
142	13	"Mind Your Dollaz"	March 2, 2020	1.10
143	14	"Baby Mena Drama"	March 9, 2020	1.01

== Specials ==
Year	Special	Season	Premiere	Viewers (millions)
2015	Love & Hip Hop Live: The Wedding	5	May 25, 2015	2.04
2017	Love & Hip Hop New York: Dirty Little Secrets	8	October 18, 2017	0.70
2017	Remy & Papoose: A Merry Mackie Christmas	8	December 18, 2017	1.23
2018	Love & Hip Hop: The Love Edition	8	February 12, 2018	1.25

== Ratings ==
Love & Hip Hop: New York : U.S. viewers per episode (millions)

Season	Episode number																	
Season	1	2	3	4	5	6	7	8	9	10	11	12	13	14	15	16	17	18
Season 1 (2011)	1.93	0.81	0.68	0.73	0.89	0.69	1.18	0.80	1.26	–								
Season 2 (2011–12)	2.56	2.78	2.92	2.38	2.28	2.70	2.81	3.41	3.03	3.14	2.30	–						
Season 3 (2013)	2.59	2.20	1.93	2.19	1.92	1.88	1.81	1.81	1.62	1.51	1.75	1.78	1.80	2.35	–			
Season 4 (2013–14)	2.99	2.94	3.36	3.05	3.18	2.95	2.95	2.38	2.88	3.11	3.44	3.05	3.15	3.51	–			
Season 5 (2014–15)	2.48	2.17	2.66	2.49	2.38	2.82	2.58	2.54	2.63	2.56	2.48	2.49	2.20	2.53	2.13	2.37	2.28	–
Season 6 (2015–16)	2.67	2.28	2.68	2.72	2.60	2.76	2.77	2.63	2.59	2.49	2.48	2.26	2.41	2.58	–			
Season 7 (2016–17)	2.35	2.48	2.17	2.28	2.54	2.29	2.28	2.61	2.18	2.49	2.71	2.38	2.33	2.27	2.51	2.63	–	
Season 8 (2017–18)	2.21	1.98	1.89	1.82	1.80	1.81	1.84	1.51	1.10	1.84	1.86	1.84	1.84	1.97	1.95	1.79	1.81	1.73
Season 9 (2018–19)	1.85	1.61	1.60	1.48	0.90	1.33	1.45	1.44	1.34	1.34	1.33	1.43	1.26	1.28	1.36	1.63	–	
Season 10 (2019–20)	1.47	1.41	1.13	1.22	1.43	1.27	1.28	1.32	1.26	1.22	1.17	1.12	1.10	1.01	–			

Audience measurement performed by Nielsen Media Research
