= Love & Hip Hop: New York season 5 =

Love & Hip Hop: New York
- Season 5
- Cover used by the iTunes Store
- Starring: Yandy Smith; Tara Wallace; Cyn Santana; Chrissy Monroe; Amina Buddafly; Erica Mena
- No. of episodes: 17

Release
- Original network: VH1
- Original release: December 15, 2014 – April 13, 2015

Season chronology
- ← Previous; Season 4 Next → Season 6

The fifth season of the reality television series Love & Hip Hop: New York aired on VH1 from December 15, 2014 until April 13, 2015. The season was primarily filmed in New York City, New York. It was executively produced by Mona Scott-Young and Stephanie R. Gayle for Monami Entertainment, Toby Barraud, Stefan Springman, David DiGangi and Ian Gelfand for Eastern TV, and Susan Levison, Nina L. Diaz and Vivian Gomez for VH1.

The series chronicles the lives of several women and men in the New York area, involved in hip hop music. It consists of 17 episodes, including a two-part reunion special hosted by Nina Parker.

== Production ==
On January 30, 2014, VH1 announced the renewal of Love & Hip Hop for a fifth season. The series premiered on December 15, 2014. With the exception of Tahiry Jose, Erica Jean and K. Michelle, all of whom left or were fired from the show, the rest of the main cast members from last season returned, along with Cyn Santana, who was promoted to the main cast, and Chink Santana's girlfriend Chrissy Monroe. Producer Cisco Rosado joined the supporting cast, along with Darryl Strawberry's daughter Diamond Strawberry, Chink Santana and aspiring performers Precious Paris and Jhonni Blaze.

On April 14, 2015, VH1 announced that Love & Hip Hop: The Wedding, a two-hour special featuring the marriage between cast members Yandy Smith and Mendeecees Harris, would air live on May 25, 2015. The special was preceded by six exclusive webisodes that were made available on VH1's website from May 12, 2015. The special aired to over 2 million viewers and featured appearances from other VH1 reality stars, including cast mates from Love & Hip Hop: Atlanta, Love & Hip Hop: Hollywood, Black Ink Crew, Mob Wives, as well as from Bravo's The Real Housewives of Atlanta.

== Synopsis ==
Yandy welcomes Mendeecees home from jail. Cyn and Erica's relationship comes to a violent end. Amina is preparing to give birth to Peter's child but he keeps running back to Tara. Diamond Strawberry has left her daughter in Los Angeles to pursue a relationship with producer Cisco Rosado in New York, but they are both hiding secrets from each other. Socialite Chrissy Monroe is ready to start a family with rapper Chink Santana.

== Cast ==
=== Starring ===
- Yandy Smith (17 episodes)
- Tara Wallace (16 episodes)
- Cyn Santana (17 episodes)
- Chrissy Monroe (15 episodes)
- Amina Buddafly (16 episodes)
- Erica Mena (15 episodes)

=== Also starring ===
- Mendeecees Harris (16 episodes)
- Peter Gunz (16 episodes)
- Diamond Strawberry (13 episodes)
- Cisco Rosado (15 episodes)
- Chink Santana (12 episodes)
- Rich Dollaz (16 episodes)
- Precious Paris (8 episodes)
- Jhonni Blaze (10 episodes)
- Rashidah Ali (8 episodes)

Kimbella Vanderhee returns in a guest role. Diamond's mother Lisa Strawberry, Erica's friend Albee Yours, Mendeecees' assistant Remy, Cisco's mother Maggie and his baby mama Tasha appear in several episodes as guest stars. The show also features minor appearances from notable figures within the hip hop industry and the cast's inner circle, including Yandy's cousin Maurice Talton, Amina's sisters Jazz & Sophie Schmahl, Black Ink Crew's Ceasar and Dutchess, Erica's mother Sonia, Yandy's artist J. Dinero, Samantha Wallace, Judy Harris, Kim Wallace, DJ Kay Slay, Uncle Murda, Charlie Murphy, Amina's manager Orrin Ennis, Rich's mother Jewel Escobar, Darryl Strawberry, Yandy's mother Laura Smith and Cyn's boyfriend Ray Stacks.

== Episodes ==
No. overall	No. in season	Title	Original release date	US viewers (millions)
49	1	"Bride and Prejudice"	December 15, 2014	2.48
Mendeecees and Yandy figure out the next steps in their lives. Erica wants to move things forward with Cyn but Cyn is skeptical. Peter tries to do right by Amina, but can't get Tara off his mind. Cyn and Chrissy Monroe are added to the opening credits, replacing departing cast members Tahiry, Erica J. and K. Michelle. Diamond Strawberry, Cisco and Chink Santana join the supporting cast.
50	2	"You're Canceled"	December 22, 2014	2.17
Diamond and Cisco try to overcome lies and trust issues in their relationship. Amina starts to realize Peter and Tara are not over. Mendeecees wants to accelerate their life plans, but Yandy wants to play it safe.
51	3	"A Lie for a Lie"	January 5, 2015	2.66
Erica and Cyn's relationship blows up due to suspected infidelities. Peter lies to Amina about a "business trip". Yandy and Mendeecees set a date for their wedding. Cisco digs into his past and tries to get Diamond back. Although credited, Chrissy does not appear.
52	4	"A Woman Scorned"	January 12, 2015	2.49
Cyn and Erica's relationship spirals after Cyn digs into their business dealings. Yandy surprises Mendeecees with a "gift". Peter's "business trip" with Tara doesn't quite go as planned.
53	5	"Oh Baby!"	January 19, 2015	2.38
Erica reconnects with Rich and learns he's got a new client she doesn't approve of. Cisco speaks with his baby mama to try to get past their issues. Chrissy pressures Chink to have a baby and ends up taking matters into her own hands. Although credited, Tara does not appear.
54	6	"Exes and Ohs"	January 26, 2015	2.82
Peter comes clean to Amina about being in Barbados with Tara. Cyn and Rich agree to work together, until Erica tries to sabotage their event. Chrissy realizes Chink's unwillingness to get divorced is a deal breaker. Precious Paris joins the supporting cast.
55	7	"Mama Drama"	February 2, 2015	2.58
Peter tries to convince Amina it's over between him and Tara. Rich begins working with his new artist, Jhonni Blaze, but lies about it when confronted by Paris. Cisco and Diamond attempt a sit down. Jhonni Blaze joins the supporting cast. Although credited, Chrissy and Erica do not appear.
56	8	"Worlds Collide"	February 9, 2015	2.54
Yandy and Mendeecees continue to have problems with their extended family. Rich's two artists have a memorable first meeting. Cisco tries to get to a good place with his children's mother, Tasha.
57	9	"Call Your Bluff"	February 16, 2015	2.63
Rich tries to get his artists in check, but is unable to control two of them. Diamond uncovers Cisco's hidden conversations with Tasha and confronts him about it. Amina rattles Tara when she reveals a secret from Peter's past.
58	10	"Regrets Only"	February 23, 2015	2.56
Peter is furious that Amina snitched on him. Fed up, she takes the baby and leaves to Germany. Mendeecees lies to Yandy that their son is in the hospital, which sends Yandy into a frenzy. Erica tells her family that she is in love.
59	11	"You Again?"	March 2, 2015	2.48
Emotions run high when Erica and Cyn meet one last time. Chink feels betrayed by Chrissy's secret magazine shoot. Peter realizes what he has lost and chases Amina to Germany but it could be too late.
60	12	"Mind Your Manners"	March 9, 2015	2.49
Diamond falls hard for Rich, claiming him in front of Jhonni, and in public. Yandy takes matters into her own hands with her assistant Remy. Tara encourages Amina to stand her ground with Peter. Rashidah joins the supporting cast. Although credited, Erica does not appear.
61	13	"All Heart"	March 16, 2015	2.20
Jhonni pours her heart out to Rich only to have it broken. Cisco confesses to Cyn he is falling for her. Chrissy heads to DC and finally meets Chink's family. Yandy receives some grim news about her father. Although credited, Amina and Erica do not appear.
62	14	"The Final Countdown"	March 23, 2015	2.53
Jhonni and Rich deal with some unfinished business. Erica tries to help Peter win Amina back. Chrissy gives Chink an ultimatum. Cyn and Cisco discuss their relationship. Yandy decides to take a big step before the baby is born.
63	15	"Surprise, Surprise"	March 30, 2015	2.13
Peter presents Amina with a ring, asking her to stay. Chrissy tells Chink to make a final decision on their relationship. Diamond and Cisco come together for one last time. Yandy drops a big surprise on Mendeecees at the baby shower.
64	16	"Reunion – Part 1"	April 6, 2015	2.37
The cast reunites, igniting all of the explosive moments and encounters from season five. Erica tends to her unfinished business with Chrissy and Cyn, while Jhonni takes aim at Diamond. hosts: Nina Parker, Mona Scott-Young (segments with Erica Mena)
65	17	"Reunion – Part 2"	April 13, 2015	2.28
The drama continues between Jhonni and Diamond. Peter is smack in the middle of his ongoing love triangle. Yandy handles Remy once and for all. A farewell becomes final when Erica Mena reflects on her time on the show. hosts: Nina Parker, Mona Scott-Young (segments with Erica Mena)

== Webisodes ==
=== Check Yourself ===
Love & Hip Hop New York: Check Yourself, which features the cast's reactions to each episode, was released weekly with every episode on digital platforms.

=== Bonus scenes ===
Deleted scenes from the season's episodes were released weekly as bonus content on VH1's official website.

== Music ==
Several cast members had their music featured on the show and released singles to coincide with the airing of the episodes.

List of songs performed and/or featured in Love & Hip Hop: New York season five
Title	Performer	Album	Episode(s)	Notes	Ref
Alone	Amina Buddafly & Jazz Buddafly (as Black Buddafly)	We R	2	performed in studio session	
9 In The Morning	Jhonni Blaze	single	8	performed in studio session	
Times Up (feat. Kid Capri)	Precious Paris	single	9, 15	performed in studio session	
The Real Me	Amina Buddafly	Mymusic	10	performed onstage	
Watching Over Me	Cisco Rosado	single	11	played in studio session	
What to Do (featuring Amina Buddafly)	Peter Gunz	Mymusic	12	performed in studio session	
How Can You Leave?	Cyn Santana	single	13	played in studio session performed onstage	
Revolver (feat. Rich Andruws)	Jhonni Blaze	single	15	played in studio session	
Do What You Want (feat. Amina Buddafly)	Peter Gunz	single	15	performed in studio session	
