= Love & Hip Hop: Atlanta season 7 =

Love & Hip Hop: Atlanta
- Season 7
- Cover used by the iTunes Store
- Starring: Rasheeda; Mimi Faust; Karlie Redd; Jessica Dime; Tommie Lee; Erica Mena; Stevie J
- No. of episodes: 18

Release
- Original network: VH1
- Original release: March 19 – July 16, 2018

Season chronology
- ← Previous; Season 6 Next → Season 8

The seventh season of the reality television series Love & Hip Hop: Atlanta premiered on VH1 on March 19, 2018 until July 16, 2018. The season was primarily filmed in Atlanta, Georgia. It is executively produced by Mona Scott-Young and Stephanie R. Gayle for Monami Entertainment, Toby Barraud, Stefan Springman, David DiGangi, Lashan Browning and Donna Edge-Rachell for Eastern TV, and Nina L. Diaz, Liz Fine and Vivian Gomez for VH1.

The series chronicles the lives of several women and men in the Atlanta area, involved in hip-hop music. It consists of 18 episodes, including a two-part reunion special hosted by Nina Parker.

== Production ==
Season seven of Love & Hip Hop: Atlanta began filming during the last week of October 2017. A few days prior, singer Jhonni Blaze, who appeared on Love & Hip Hop: New York and the cancelled Love & Hip Hop: Houston, exposed several of the upcoming season's storylines in a series of Instagram videos, including Rasheeda and Kirk's allegedly fabricated secret baby storyline and Stevie J's alleged sexual tryst with transgender model Shauna Brooks. Blaze was set to join the cast as Stevie's new artist, serving as a replacement for Joseline Hernandez, however she fell out with show's producers after her Love & Hip Hop: Houston co-star and rival Just Brittany was cast. On December 11, 2017, filming was interrupted in Buckhead after a mall security guard was allegedly run down by a disgruntled customer. The show made headlines again a few weeks later, after it was alleged that cast member Tommie Lee brought a loaded gun to set, in a heated confrontation with Karen King. In February 2018, Tommie ran into legal issues during filming after allegedly attacking a jewelry store employee.

On February 16, 2018, VH1 announced Love & Hip Hop: Atlanta would be returning for a seventh season on March 19, 2018, with Love & Hip Hop: New York's Erica Mena as part of the cast. The same day they released a scene from the premiere episode, showing Erica's arrival to Atlanta. This season featured an entirely new opening credits sequence. Season seven saw the promotion of Jessica Dime to the main cast after appearing as a supporting cast member for three seasons. New cast members include Jessica's fiancé Shawne Williams, Grammy Award winning songwriter Sean Garrett, Jamaican recording artist Spice, singer and Signed star Just Brittany, rappers Tokyo Vanity and BK Brasco and music executive Keely the Boss. Although not included in the initial cast announcement, rapper Tabius Tate and party promoter K. Botchey would also appear in supporting roles. After a two year absence from the show, Erica Dixon would return as a supporting cast member for two episodes. Love & Hip Hop: New York star Rich Dollaz would make a special crossover appearance in the last two episodes of the season.

On February 20, 2018, VH1 released a teaser with the season's tagline "the game has changed", featuring Mena alongside returning cast members Rasheeda, Stevie J, Karlie Redd and Mimi Faust. The season's promotional videos would all follow a card game or poker-themed aesthetic, with cast members dressed as playing cards. On March 12, 2018, a five-minute super-trailer was released, followed by "meet the cast" interview promos featuring new cast members Erica Mena, Tokyo Vanity, Spice, Keely the Boss, BK Brasco, and Estelita Quintero. On March 13, 2018, VH1 released the first five minutes of the season's premiere episode.

In the eleventh episode, "Houston We Have A Problem", one scene shows an intoxicated Tommie Lee breaking the fourth wall and attacking a producer, as well as security. In an unusual move, executive producer Stephanie Gayle announced to the cast on camera that Tommie was no longer allowed on set, effectively firing her from the show. However, she returned to the show two episodes later, on the condition that she not drink on set. During filming, Jessica Dime publicly criticised Mona Scott-Young for passing on a proposed wedding special starring her and Shawne. Subsequently, she was phased out of the show and did not attend the season's reunion.

=== Reception ===
The season garnered the lowest ratings in the show's history, with its premiere episode down over a million viewers compared to last season.

== Cast ==
=== Starring ===
- Rasheeda (17 episodes)
- Mimi Faust (16 episodes)
- Karlie Redd (18 episodes)
- Jessica Dime (7 episodes)
- Tommie Lee (11 episodes)
- Erica Mena (14 episodes)
- Stevie J (9 episodes)

=== Also starring ===
- Kirk Frost (15 episodes)
- Yung Joc (16 episodes)
- Estelita Quintero (15 episodes)
- Spice (13 episodes)
- Jasmine Washington (10 episodes)
- Shirleen Harvell (5 episodes)
- Sierra Gates (16 episodes)
- BK Brasco (14 episodes)
- Tokyo Vanity (15 episodes)
- Melissa Scott (7 episodes)
- Shooter Gates (9 episodes)
- Tabius Tate (10 episodes)
- Samantha Lee (5 episodes)
- Keely Hill (11 episodes)
- Just Brittany (10 episodes)
- Tiarra Becca (10 episodes)
- Savannah Jordan (2 episodes)
- Kelsie Frost (8 episodes)
- Karen King (4 episodes)
- Momma Dee (10 episodes)
- Shawne Williams (5 episodes)
- K. Botchey (8 episodes)
- Lil Scrappy (3 episodes)
- Sean Garrett (13 episodes)
- Bambi Benson (3 episodes)
- Erica Dixon (2 episodes)
- Rich Dollaz (2 episodes)

Tammy Rivera returns in a guest role for two episodes. Ty Young, Tommie's sister Versace, Sas and Bleu DaVinci would appear as guest stars in several episodes. The show features minor appearances from notable figures within the hip hop industry and Atlanta's social scene, including Jazze Pha, Tommie's brothers Duby & Yanira, Erica's friend Albee Yours, Rasheeda and Kirk's son Ky Frost, Stevie's children Sade and Dorian Jordan, Married to Medicine's Dr. Jackie Walters, Michael Blackson, Cocoa Brown, Sam Phillips, Amber Priddy, Ernest Bryant, Dawn Heflin and Flavor of Love's Deelishis.

== Episodes ==
No. overall	No. in season	Title	Original release date	US viewers (millions)
105	1	"Let the Games Begin"	March 19, 2018	2.21
Erica Mena arrives in Atlanta, ready to kickstart a music career. Kirk confirms that he is the father of Jasmine's baby. Tommie and her sister Versace come to blows. guest stars: Ty (Mimi's girlfriend), Sierra, Jazze Pha (record producer), BK Brasco, Sean Garrett, Havali (Tommie's daughter), Samaria (Tommie's daughter), Rajaysha (Tommie's sister), Yani (Tommie's brother), Samantha (Tommie's mother), Duby (Tommie's brother), Versace (Tommie's sister), Shirleen, Kelsie Frost cameo: Albee Yours Jessica Dime and Erica Mena are added to the opening credits, replacing departing cast members Tammy and Joseline. Erica Mena and Spice join the cast.
106	2	"Oh Baby"	March 26, 2018	1.90
Jasmine comes looking for Rasheeda at her store. Estelita reveals her traumatic past. Sierra has moved on with BK Brasco but is blindsided by the revelation that Shooter may have a child with another woman. guest stars: Kelsie Frost, Melissa, Albee Yours (Erica's friend), Yvette Washington (Jasmine's mother), Gloria Johnson (Jasmine's grandmother), Kirk Jr. (Kirk's son), Ky (Kirk's son), Kim (Sierra's mom), Shan (stylist) Tokyo Vanity and BK Brasco join the supporting cast. Although credited, Jessica and Stevie do not appear.
107	3	"Beginnings and Endings"	April 2, 2018	1.90
Jessica reveals to Shawne that she's pregnant. Shooter mourns the death of his son in a shooting. Erica and Estelita feud with Stevie's new artist Just Brittany. guest stars: Shawne, Tabius Tate, Ty, Dexter Hampton (personal trainer), Jazze Pha (record producer), Lady Bose (vocal coach), Shooter, Just Brittany Although credited, Rasheeda does not appear.
108	4	"Do It for Finesse"	April 9, 2018	2.03
Kirk and Jasmine come face to face for the first time in a year. Samantha pushes Tommie to make up with her sister Versace. Karlie finds herself in a new role as caretaker for her sick father. Shooter leans on friends. guest stars: K. Botchey, Sas, Bleu DaVinci (rapper), Sean Garrett, Versace (Tommie's sister), Robert (Karlie's father), Katrina (Karlie's sister), Tiarra cameo: Kannon Frost, Yani, Duby, Rajaysha Tabius, Keely and Just Brittany join the supporting cast. Although credited, Mimi, Jessica, Erica and Stevie do not appear.
109	5	"Dangerous Liaisons"	April 16, 2018	1.97
Stevie stuns his family with a shocking announcement. Karlie encourages Rasheeda to date her hunky new trainer. Dime hears her baby’s heartbeat for the first time. guest stars: Donnell Burns (personal trainer), Dr. Jackie (OB/GYN), Tammy Rivera, Ty, April (Papered Wonders, owner), Shawne, Yani (Tommie's brother), Duby (Tommie's brother) cameo: Sade Jordan, Dorian Jordan
110	6	"I'm Telling"	April 23, 2018	2.01
Karen struggles to get Scrapp out of jail. Karlie accuses Keely of being messy. Sierra confronts Shooter. guest stars: Michael Blackson (comedian), Cocoa Brown (comedian), Reef (creative director), Sam Phillips (director), Jerry (bail bondsman) on the phone: Scrapp DeLeon Although credited, Jessica and Tommie do not appear.
111	7	"Showing Out"	April 30, 2018	2.05
Just Brittany and Keely’s friendship goes up in flames; Rasheeda sets clear boundaries for Kirk; Stevie wins Estelita back over to the good guys team; Tokyo and Sierra plot to take down Keely guest stars: Nurse Bae, Sharonda (co-owner), Sean Garrett Shawne and K. Botchey join the supporting cast. Although credited, Tommie and Erica do not appear.
112	8	"Tokyo Insanity"	May 7, 2018	2.06
Scrappy and Bambi return and Momma Dee immediately meddles in the newlyweds' affairs; a brawl breaks out at Tokyo's album release party; Tokyo suspects Tabius is cheating on her; Dime has an emotional conversation. guest stars: Bleu DaVinci (rapper), Diane (Jessica's mother), Dej, Crystal, Tammy Rivera Sean Garrett joins the supporting cast. Although credited, Mimi, Tommie and Erica do not appear.
113	9	"Team Rasheeda"	May 14, 2018	2.02
Upset with Kirk, Jasmine plans another pop-up but Rasheeda’s friends confront her; Tommie and Spice butt heads; Sierra learns that BK keeps secrets; Keely and Bleu have an emotional sit-down guest stars: Bleu DaVinci cameo: Shirleen Erica Dixon returns as a supporting cast member. Although credited, Jessica, Erica, and Stevie do not appear.
114	10	"The Friendtervention"	May 21, 2018	2.03
Kirk mourns his mother. Karlie exposes BK's infidelity, putting a strain on her friendship with Sierra. Keely and Bleu have an emotional moment over their child. guest stars: Papa Frost (Kirk's father), Amber Priddy, Joy, Bleu DaVinci, Xavier (Keely and Bleu's son) cameo: Todd Tucker, Shirleen, Kelsie Although credited, Jessica, Tommie and Stevie do not appear.
115	11	"Houston, We Have a Problem"	May 28, 2018	1.92
Jessica and Shawne have a gender reveal party. Spice and Tabius start dating. The cast travel to Houston for Rasheeda's store opening, but Tommie is kicked off the trip after having a drunken meltdown. guest stars: Ty, Diane (Jessica's mother), Jesse (Jessica's father), Stephanie Gayle (executive producer) Although credited, Stevie does not appear.
116	12	"Don't Mess with Texas"	June 4, 2018	2.11
While in Texas for the Pressed opening, Tokyo confronts Spice over their drama with Tabius, Yung Joc flirts with Karlie, and Jasmine tries to make peace with Rasheeda guest stars: Johnny Dang (shop owner), Ernest, Ty cameo: Shirleen Although credited, Jessica, Tommie, and Stevie do not appear.
117	13	"Cowgirls Gone Wild"	June 11, 2018	2.32
Finished with their business in Houston, the crew heads to the dude ranch; Rasheeda hopes everyone can put their drama to the side to enjoy the trip, but Spice and Tokyo quickly get back into it; the other girls start taking sides. guest stars: Ty, Pistol Packin' Paula (gunslinger) Although credited, Jessica, Tommie, and Stevie do not appear.
118	14	"Horsing Around"	June 18, 2018	2.10
The drama at the dude ranch continues when the group goes horseback riding; BK makes a romantic gesture to win Sierra back; Joc and Karlie continue to rekindle their friendship; back in Atlanta, Tommie faces her demons. guest stars: Ty, Joe Schrank (counselor), Jay Calkins (ranch manager), Scott "Chef Manno" Manning (ranch chef), Sas, Versace Although credited, Jessica and Stevie do not appear.
119	15	"Showing Off"	June 25, 2018	2.10
Kelsie brings Kirk, Jasmine and Kannon together. Hell breaks loose at Stevie J's showcase, as Stevie's daughter Savannah comes for Erica Mena, and Estelita, Keely and Spice gang up on Just Brittany. guest stars: Tricia Solomon (divorce lawyer), Rose Palmer (founder of Connecting families), Rich Dollaz cameo: Kannon, Dorian Jordan Although credited, Jessica and Tommie do not appear.
120	16	"Peace & Blessings"	July 2, 2018	2.08
Shooter puts together a big anti-violence rally to honor his late son. Dime's baby shower takes a turn when Stevie and Sean Garrett argue. Stevie enlists Rich Dollaz to get back at Erica. Tommie reconnects with the group and Dime gives birth. guest stars: Dawn, Deelishis, Jesse (Jessica's father), Marcia (Shawne's mother), Diane (Jessica's mother), Erica Gillis (Rod Jr's mother) cameo: Sas, Bonnie Bella Jordan, Karter Frost, Ky Frost, Kelsie Frost, Dr. Jackie Rich Dollaz joins the supporting cast, although he would only appear in this episode.
121	17	"Reunion – Part 1"	July 9, 2018	2.13
Stevie J walks off set after a heated argument with Erica Mena. Karlie and Joc discuss their flirtation. Tommie and Spice come to blows. host: Nina Parker
122	18	"Reunion – Part 2"	July 16, 2018	2.05
BK gets exposed as cheating on Sierra in a deleted scene. Spice and Tokyo talk it out. host: Nina Parker guest stars: Bleu DaVinci

== Webisodes ==
=== Check Yourself ===
Love & Hip Hop Atlanta: Check Yourself, which features the cast's reactions to each episode, was released weekly with every episode on digital platforms.

List of Love & Hip Hop Atlanta: Check Yourself Season 7 episodes

Episode	Title	Featured cast members	Ref
1	"Man Or Manager"	Yung Joc, BK, Estelita, Spice	
2	"Whoa, Jaguar"	Yung Joc, Melissa, Tokyo Vanity	
3	"No-Re-Mi"	Spice, Estelita, Tokyo Vanity, Melissa	
4	"A Friend in Need"	Karlie, Keely, K. Botchey, Yung Joc	
5	"Sweatin' It Out"	Karlie, Kelsie	
6	"Keely Stirs Up Some Drama"	Keely, Karlie, K. Botchey, Yung Joc, Tokyo Vanity	
7	"Just Brittany Vs. Keely"	Estelita, Just Brittany, Keely	
8	"Disinvited"	K. Botchey, Keely, Tokyo Vanity, Karlie, Yung Joc	
9	"Everyone's Messy Business Comes Out"	Tokyo Vanity, Yung Joc, Karlie, Sean	
10	"Grandmotherly Advice"	Tiarra, Just Brittany, Momma Dee	
11	"Tea and Bowling"	Spice, Sean, Karlie, Yung Joc	
12	"Tokyo Rift"	Melissa, Karlie, Tokyo Vanity, Spice	
13	"Dude Ranch Drama"	Karlie, Tokyo Vanity, BK, Sierra, Yung Joc	
14	"My Horse Had an Attitude"	Karlie, Tokyo Vanity, BK, Sierra, Yung Joc	
15	"In the DangerZone"	Melissa, Tokyo Vanity, Tabius, Just Brittany, Yung Joc, Karlie	
16	"Baby Shower Blow Up"	Karlie, Yung Joc, Melissa, Tokyo Vanity, Shooter	

== Music ==
Several cast members had their music featured on the show and released singles to coincide with the airing of the episodes.

List of songs performed and/or featured in Love & Hip Hop: Atlanta season seven
Title	Performer	Album	Episode(s)	Notes	Ref
Back Bend	Spice	single	1	performed onstage	
HeadCrack	Jessica Dime	single	3	performed in music video shoot	
That's My Sis	Just Brittany	single	4	performed onstage	
I'm the Shit	Tokyo Vanity	single	8	performed in studio session	
Closer	Momma Dee	single	9	performed onstage	
Patrona	Estelita Quintero	single	15	performed in music video shoot	
Imma Get It	Tommie & Spice	single	16	played at release party	
