= Scared Famous (TV series) =

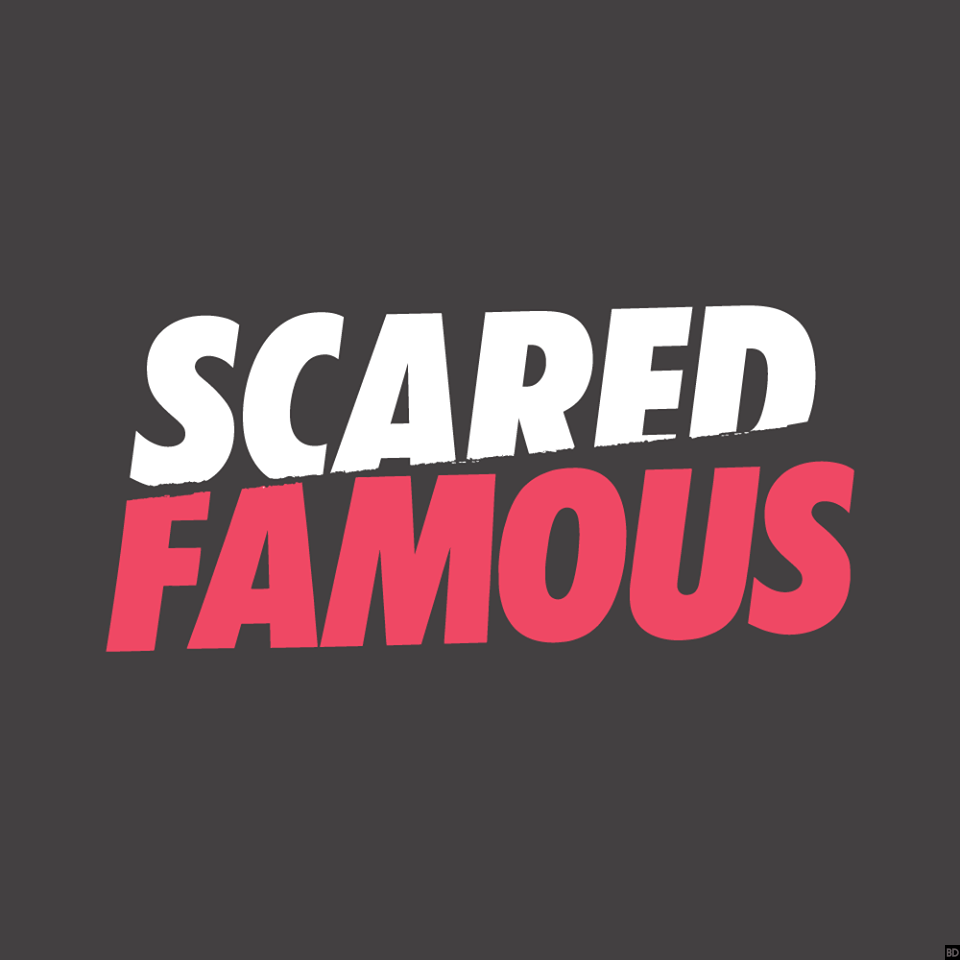
- Genre: Horror; Reality television
- Presented by: Redman
- Country of origin: United States
- Original language: English
- No. of seasons: 1
- No. of episodes: 8

Production
- Executive producers: Nina L. Diaz; Liz Fine; Lily Neumeyer; Elena Diaz; Jihoon Zun
- Producers: David Garfinkle; Jay Renfroe; Jason Carbone
- Running time: 60 minutes
- Production company: Renegade 83

Original release
- Network: VH1
- Release: October 23 – December 11, 2017

Scared Famous is a horror reality television series hosted by Redman. It features ten cast members from various VH1 shows competing in horror-themed challenges inside a haunted house in Savannah, Georgia for a prize of up to $100,000 for their favorite charity.

== Summary ==
Ten contestants move into a house haunted by two twins and various demonic forces in Savannah, Georgia, in order to win a prize of up to US$100,000 donated to a charity in their name. This prize is won by completing various "horror movie-inspired" Scream Team Challenges worth different amounts of money. Near the end of each episode, one celebrity is voted to be put up for elimination by the others as a "dead weight" and must compete against another contestant of their choice in the various "Devil Jeopardy" elimination challenges. The loser of this challenge is eliminated and "killed", until only one remains, receiving what they had earned in all of the Scream Team Challenges they had completed throughout the competition.

== Contestants ==
Name	Show	Charity	Eliminated	Placement
Don Benjamin	America's Next Top Model	Peace Over Violence	**Winner**	
Sky Days	Black Ink Crew	Women's Resource Center for Domestic Violence	Episode 8	Runner-up
Erica Mena	Love & Hip Hop: New York	Together We Rise	Episode 8	3rd/4th Place
Safaree Samuels	Love & Hip Hop: Hollywood	Children of Jamaica	Episode 8	3rd/4th Place
Eva Marcille	America's Next Top Model	Inclusion Clubhouse	Episode 8	5th Place
Alaska Thunderfuck	RuPaul's Drag Race All Stars	Los Angeles LGBT Center	Episode 7	6th Place
Tiffany "New York" Pollard	Flavor of Love	Children's Hunger Fund	Episode 6	7th Place
Erica Mena	Love & Hip Hop: New York	Together We Rise	Episode 5	7th Place; Re-entered later on
Drita D'Avanzo	Mob Wives	The Breast Cancer Research Foundation	Episode 4	8th Place
Yung Joc	Love & Hip Hop: Atlanta	Ludacris Foundation	Episode 3	9th Place
Nikki Mudarris	Love & Hip Hop: Hollywood	Mental Health America	Episode 2	10th Place

=== Progress chart ===
Season 1 (2017)

Progress Chart
Scream Team Challenge:	**$50,000**	**$10,000**	**$10,000**	**$10,000**	**$10,000**	**$10,000**	N/A			**$10,000**
Scream Team Bank:	**$50,000**	**$60,000**	**$70,000**	**$80,000**	**$90,000**	**$90,000**	N/A			**$100,000**
Dead Weight:	N/A	Nikki	Erica	Tiffany	Erica; Safaree	Eva	Alaska	N/A		
Dead Weight's Choice:	N/A	Don	Yung Joc	Drita	N/A	Tiffany	Safaree	N/A		
Eliminated:	N/A	Nikki	Yung Joc	Drita	Erica	Tiffany	Alaska	Eva	Erica; Safaree	Sky
	**Episode 1**	**Episode 2**	**Episode 3**^{1}	**Episode 4**	**Episode 5**^{2}	**Episode 6**^{3}	**Episode 7**^{4}	**Episode 8**^{5}		
Don	SAFE	RISK	IMMUNE	SAFE	SAFE	SAFE	SAFE	SAFE	SAFE	**WINNER**
Sky	SAFE	SAFE	SAFE	SAFE	SAFE	SAFE	SAFE	SAFE	SAFE	**DEAD**
Erica	SAFE	SAFE	RISK	IMMUNE	**DEAD**		SAFE	SAFE	**DEAD**	
Safaree	SAFE	SAFE	SAFE	SAFE	RISK	IMMUNE	RISK	SAFE	**DEAD**	
Eva	SAFE	SAFE	SAFE	SAFE	SAFE	RISK	SAFE	**DEAD**		
Alaska	SAFE	SAFE	SAFE	SAFE	SAFE	SAFE	**DEAD**			
Tiffany	SAFE	SAFE	SAFE	RISK	IMMUNE	**DEAD**				
Drita	SAFE	SAFE	SAFE	**DEAD**						
Yung Joc	SAFE	SAFE	**DEAD**							
Nikki	SAFE	**DEAD**								

^Note 1: From episode three onward, the Devil Jeopardy elimination challenge ends on a cliffhanger, with the results of who is deemed "killed" shown in the following episode.

^Note 2: Sky won the ultimate power to choose the two contestants to participate in the Devil Jeopardy elimination challenge, she chose Erica and Safaree. The other guests were forbidden from the vote.

^Note 3: From this point on the winner of Devil Jeopardy elimination challenge will no longer receive immunity.

^Note 4: Erica was voted back into the competition by fellow eliminated guest.

^Note 5: The last episode was divided into three challenges. Erica won the first challenge and the ultimate power to eliminate a contestant immediately, she decided to eliminate Eva. Don won the second challenge and the ultimate power to choose one contestant to the finals, he chose Sky.

Color key
- Passed - The guests won the scream team challenge and had money added to their bank.
- Failed - The guests lost the scream team challenge, thus no money was added to their bank.
- Bonus - The final winner had money added to their bank by bonus.

The value in bold signifies how much that challenge was worth.

– Winner - The guest won the competition.
– Power - The guest won the challenge and the ultimate power to choose the two contestants to participate in the Devil Jeopardy elimination challenge or to eliminate the contestants immediately.
– Safe - The guest was not voted as a "dead weight" and was not picked by the dead weight to go to the Devil Jeopardy elimination.
– Risk - The guest was either voted into the Devil Jeopardy elimination as the "dead weight" or picked by them to compete against them but won the challenge.
– Immune - The guest who was voted into the Devil Jeopardy elimination, and won, thus giving them immunity from being voted into the next round's elimination.
– Return - Previously "dead" guest is voted back into the competition by fellow eliminated guests.
– Dead - The guest was either voted into the Devil Jeopardy elimination as the "dead weight" or picked by them to compete against, and lost, thus "killed" off the show. They would appear in later episodes as "ghosts".

== Episodes ==
=== Season 1 (2017) ===
No. overall	No. in season	Title	Original release date	US viewers (millions)
1	1	"Savannah Horror Stories"	October 23, 2017	1.32
2	2	"Death is Coming!"	October 30, 2017	1.22
3	3	"Tales from the Woods"	November 6, 2017	1.01
4	4	"50 Shades of Horror"	November 13, 2017	1.02
5	5	"Insane Drown Posse"	November 20, 2017	0.97
6	6	"Coffin Fever"	November 27, 2017	1.04
7	7	"The Waking Dead"	December 4, 2017	1.16
8	8	"4 Funerals and a Finale"	December 11, 2017	1.01

== See also ==
- Escape the Night
- 13: Fear Is Real
- Hellevator
