= Love & Hip Hop: New York season 6 =

Love & Hip Hop: New York
- Season 6
- DVD cover
- Starring: Yandy Smith-Harris; Tara Wallace; Cardi B; Amina Buddafly; Moe Money & Sexxy Lexxy; Mariahlynn; Remy Ma
- No. of episodes: 14

Release
- Original network: VH1
- Original release: December 14, 2015 – March 28, 2016

Season chronology
- ← Previous; Season 5 Next → Season 7

The sixth season of the reality television series Love & Hip Hop: New York aired on VH1 from December 14, 2015 until March 28, 2016. The season was primarily filmed in New York City, New York. It was executively produced by Mona Scott-Young and Stephanie R. Gayle for Monami Entertainment, Toby Barraud, Stefan Springman, Mala Chapple, David DiGangi, and Ian Gelfand for Eastern TV, and Susan Levison, Nina L. Diaz, Ken Martinez and Vivian Gomez for VH1.

The series chronicles the lives of several women and men in the New York area, involved in hip hop music. It consists of 14 episodes, including a two-part reunion special hosted by Nina Parker.

== Production ==
On July 7, 2015, shortly after her release from prison, Remy Ma announced that she was joining the show for season six, along with her husband Papoose. On November 2, 2015, VH1 announced that Love & Hip Hop would be returning for a sixth season on December 14, 2015. A 5-minute "super-trailer" was released on November 30, 2015.

The cast would undergo a major cast change for the third time in the show's history, with only Yandy, Tara and Amina returning from last season's main cast. They were joined by Remy, social media personality Cardi B and up-and-coming rappers Mariahlynn and Miss Moe Money and Sexy Lexxy of the rap duo BBOD. The season's storylines focused more on the struggles of female rappers in the industry than ever before. Papoose would appear as a supporting cast member, along with radio personality DJ Self, his girlfriend Yorma Hernandez, and rapper Bianca Bonnie. Rose, a stylist who has an affair with Self, appeared in a minor supporting role.

== Synopsis ==
New York City, the place where it all began. For us, the women in hip hop, the hustle is harder. Talent grants you entry into the party but making it in this game means overcoming everything and everyone that stands in your way. We've got to hold down our families in the face of adversity and defend our relationship at any cost. We strive for love and happiness but carry with us our broken hearts. Through it all we must stay strong in our resolve, regardless who might stand in the way of our happiness. Out here, we use what we have to get what we want. But men aren't the only players in this game. For us, making it big means fighting for that top spot in a place where legends are born and bred every single day. So welcome back to the big apple. Where the players may change but the game remains the same. Cause its every woman for herself, in love and hip hop.

— Yandy Smith-Harris, opening monologue

== Cast ==
=== Starring ===
- Yandy Smith-Harris (13 episodes)
- Tara Wallace (10 episodes)
- Cardi B (13 episodes)
- Amina Buddafly (10 episodes)
- Miss Moe Money (13 episodes)
- Sexxy Lexxy (12 episodes)
- Mariahlynn (13 episodes)
- Remy Ma (11 episodes)

=== Also starring ===
- Rah Ali (14 episodes)
- Papoose (9 episodes)
- Mendeecees Harris (7 episodes)
- Peter Gunz (13 episodes)
- Bianca Bonnie (10 episodes)
- DJ Self (12 episodes)
- Rich Dollaz (11 episodes)
- Yorma Hernandez (8 episodes)
- Cisco Rosado (8 episodes)
- Rose (6 episodes)

Ashley Trowers, Miracle Kaye Hall, Jace Smith, Dejay Mackie, Jazz Schmahl, Tasha Araujo-Jacoby, Whitney Pankey, Talia Coles, Irene Mackie, Hennessy Carolina, Maddie Smith, Judy Harris, Erika DeShazo, Samantha Wallace, Kim Wallace, Raemonique Smith and Remeesha Smith appear as guest stars. Jazz Schmahl appear in an episode. The show also features minor appearances from notable figures within the hip hop industry and New York's social scene, including Quavo and Takeoff of Migos, Treach, Dr. Jeff, French Montana, Cam'ron, Maino, HoodCelebrityy, Fat Joe, Ice-T, Coco Austin and Keyshia Cole.

The show features cameo appearances from the cast's children, including Mendeeces's children Lil Mendeecees, Aasim, Omere and Skylar Harris. Juju C. appears in an uncredited cameo appearance, she would join the supporting cast in season seven.

== Episodes ==
No. overall	No. in season	Title	Original release date	US viewers (millions)
66	1	"The Crown"	December 14, 2015	2.67
Remy Ma makes a triumphant return to the stage after serving six and a half years behind bars. Peter finds himself in a sticky situation with Amina and Tara. guest stars: Lil' Mendeecees; Cardi, Moe, Lexxy, Mariahlynn and Remy join the cast and are added to the opening credits, replacing departing cast members Erica, Cyn and Chrissy Monroe. Papoose, Bianca and DJ Self join the supporting cast. Cardi, Yorma and Cisco appear in the opening monologue sequence only.
67	2	"Secrets and Lies"	December 21, 2015	2.28
Rich welcomes a new lady into his home. Rah and Yandy have difficulties with their artists. Papoose warns Remy Ma about her wedding planner. Amina confronts Tara about Peter's whereabouts, leading to an unlikely family reunion. guest stars: Ashley (Rich's daughter), Yorma, Miracle (Ashley's mom), Jace (Remy Ma's son), DJ (Papoose's daughter); Although credited, Mariahlynn does not appear.
68	3	"What's Poppin"	December 28, 2015	2.68
Cardi reveals some news to Yorma at Mariahlynn's birthday party. Moe seeks advice from Yandy after questioning Rah managing BBOD. Mendeecees prepares to head to his sentencing. guest stars: Jazz (Amina's sister); Yorma joins the supporting cast.
69	4	"The Bald and the Beautiful"	January 4, 2016	2.72
An unlikely friendship is formed when Mariahlynn advises Cardi to make things right with Self. Rich is hit with an unpleasant surprise from his daughter's mother. Cisco finds himself in a predicament at BBOD's singles release party. guest stars: Ashley (Rich's daughter), Miracle (Ashley's mom), Migos (music group), D.B. (Moe's dad); Although credited, Yandy, Tara, Amina and Remy do not appear.
70	5	"Endings & Beginnings"	January 11, 2016	2.60
Yandy learns the next steps of Mendeecees' legal case. Mariahlynn receives devastating news about a family member. Cardi B and Bianca take etiquette training. Amina reveals the fate of her pregnancy. Lexxy threatens to leave BBOD for good. guest stars: Tasha (Mariahlynn's mother), Treach (rapper), Whitney (Peter's daughter), D.B. (Moe's dad), Victoria (Moe's mom); Although credited, Remy does not appear.
71	6	"Fallout"	January 18, 2016	2.76
Self faces new temptations despite his efforts to win back Yorma. Peter and Amina try to move forward as a couple. Tara makes a shocking admission. Remy Ma helps Rah with a fashion show but the event ends in a quarrel. guest stars: Kayla (DJ Self's daughter), Talia Coles (celebrity stylist), Dr. Jeff (therapist), Toya (designer); Rose joins the supporting cast.
72	7	"Ups & Downs"	January 25, 2016	2.77
Remy attempts to reconcile with her family before the wedding day. Peter and Amina finally get their marriage back on track, but Tara has stunning news for Peter. Moe focuses on her solo career, but runs into a familiar foe at Yandy's studio session. guest stars: Talia Coles (celebrity stylist), French Montana (rapper), Irene (Papoose's mom)
73	8	"The Long Game"	February 1, 2016	2.63
Peter makes a shocking admission to Amina. Yandy gives Bianca an ultimatum. Cardi B talks marriage. The future of the Creep Squad is in jeopardy when Rich and Cisco spar over Mariahlynn. guest stars: Hennessy (Cardi B's sister), Whitney (Peter's daughter), Shaft (Cardi B's manager); Although credited, Tara, Lexxy and Remy do not appear.
74	9	"Love & War"	February 8, 2016	2.59
The fate of the creep squad hangs in the balance when Cisco and Rich come face to face. Rah Ali turns salty after Remy Ma enlists someone new to help plan her wedding. When Yorma discovers another one of Self's indiscretions, she pops up and pops off. guest stars: Cimary (Yorma's sister), Roger Rodney (wedding gown designer), Cam'ron (rapper), Maddie (Remy Ma's mom), Rosie (Rose's sister); Although credited, Tara, Cardi, Amina, Moe and Lexxy do not appear.
75	10	"Showcase Showdown"	February 22, 2016	2.49
Gwinin Fest XL brings all of the young female MCs together to battle for the top spot, but things get personal when Mariahlynn exposes Moe's skeletons and Rah takes her issues with Yandy to the next level. guest stars: Whitney (Peter's daughter), Rodney Byron Smith (designer), Success (A&R, Atlantic Records), Maino (rapper), Signature (contestant), Kyah Baby (contestant); Although credited, Tara and Amina do not appear.
76	11	"The Wait Is Over"	February 29, 2016	2.48
The winner of Gwinin Fest XL is announced. Remy Ma must make peace between Yandy and Rah in time for her wedding. Tara makes a decision about her future with Peter. guest stars: Amadeus (producer), Hennessy (Cardi B's sister), Tina (Cardi B's friend), Judy (Mendeecees' mom), Erika (Aasim's mom), Samantha (Lil Mendeecees' mom), Kim (Samantha's mom); Although credited, Amina does not appear.
77	12	"Love Conquers All"	March 7, 2016	2.26
Remy Ma's wedding day has arrived, but delays and family issues could put a halt to the ceremony. Rah and Papoose air out their issues. Peter and Amina's relationship hangs in the balance after a shocking revelation. guest stars: Ayanna (wedding coordinator), Raemonique (Remy's sister), Remeesha (Remy's sister), Jace (Remy's son), Fat Joe (rapper), Ice-T & Coco Austin (actor/actress), Irene (Papoose's mom), Maddie (Remy's mom), Rev. David Station (officiant), DJ (Papoose's daughter), Keyshia Cole (singer/songwriter) cameo: Juju C.
78	13	"Reunion – Part 1"	March 21, 2016	2.41
The cast reunites. Rah has issues with Yandy. Mariahlynn and Cardi B take aim at BBOD. Tara questions Amina's marriage to Peter. Amina drops a bomb that nobody was expecting. host: Nina Parker guest stars: Whitney (Peter's daughter)
79	14	"Reunion – Part 2"	March 28, 2016	2.58
The cast reacts to Amina's bomb drop. Yandy battles it out with Samantha and Kim. Cardi B takes aim at an unexpected target. DJ Self has nowhere to hide when Cardi, Yorma and Rose compare receipts. Remy Ma rocks the mic. host: Nina Parker guest stars: Whitney (Peter's daughter), Judy (Mendeecees' mom), Samantha (Lil Mendeecees' mom), Kim (Samantha's mom)

== Music ==
Several cast members had their music featured on the show and released singles to coincide with the airing of the episodes.

List of songs performed and/or featured in Love & Hip Hop: New York season six
Title	Performer	Album	Episode(s)	Notes	Ref
Whuteva	Remy Ma	There's Something About Remy: Based on a True Story	1	performed onstage	
Hurd Ju (feat. Remo the Hitmaker)	Bianca Bonnie	single	1	performed in studio session	
Once Upon a Time (I Was a Hoe)	Mariahlynn	single	1	performed in studio session	
The Bank	Papoose	You Can't Stop Destiny	2	performed in studio session	
Money Gun	Mariahlynn	single	3, 6	performed in studio session and onstage featured in music video shoot	
T.H.O.T.	Moe Money & Sexxy Lexxy (as BBOD)	single	3, 4	performed in rehearsal and onstage	
Give Me More	Amina Buddafly	Mymusic	7	performed in rehearsal space	
100 Bottles	Moe Money	single	7	performed in studio session	
Need Her (feat. T-Rex)	Sexxy Lexxy	single	7	performed in studio session	
Never Give Up	Amina Buddafly	Mymusic	8	performed in rehearsal space	
I Got The Juice (feat. Menace Cowwang)	DJ Self	single	8	performed onstage	
We Get Busy (feat. Jadakiss)	Mendeecees Harris (as Mendeecess)	single	9	performed in studio session	
Stripper Hoe	Cardi B	single	10	performed in studio session	
Never Bitch	Mariahlynn	single	10	performed onstage	
All My Life	Signature Meanroe	single	10	performed onstage	
Nothing New	Kyah Baby	single	10	performed onstage	
Ain't Nothing New	Bianca Bonnie	The 9th Year	10	performed onstage	
Hell of a Night	Moe Money & Sexxy Lexxy (as BBOD)	single	11	featured in music video shoot	
Hands Down (feat. Rick Ross & Yo Gotti)	Remy Ma	single	14	performed onstage at reunion	
