= Remy & Papoose: Meet the Mackies =

- Genre: Reality
- Starring: Remy Ma; Papoose
- Country of origin: United States
- Original language: English
- No. of seasons: 1
- No. of episodes: 3

Production
- Executive producers: Mona Scott-Young; Stephanie R. Gayle; Toby Barraud; Stefan Springman; Carmen Mitcho; Ashley McFarlin-Buie; Kat Uyenco; Remy Ma; Papoose; Nina L. Diaz; Liz Fine; Vivian Gomez
- Running time: 42-44 minutes
- Production companies: Eastern TV; Monami Entertainment

Original release
- Network: VH1
- Release: October 1 – October 15, 2018

Related
- Love & Hip Hop: New York

Remy & Papoose: Meet the Mackies is an American reality television series featuring Remy Ma and Papoose. The series premiered on October 1, 2018, on VH1 as a spin-off of Love & Hip Hop: New York.

== Series synopsis ==
Remy & Papoose: Meet the Mackies chronicles Remy and Papoose as they prepare for the birth of their first child together.

Remy and Papoose's family appear as supporting cast members in confessional interview segments throughout the series, including Papoose's children Shamele and Dejay, and Remy's son Jace. The season would also feature guest appearances from Remy's mother Amanda, Papoose's mother Irene, Remy's sisters Raemonique and Remeesha, Fat Joe, DJ Kay Slay and Remy and Papoose's Love & Hip Hop: New York co-stars Juju C., Yandy Smith, Maino, Safaree Samuels and Jaquáe.

== Episodes ==
No.	Title	Original release date	U.S. viewers (millions)
1	"Meet the Mackies"	October 1, 2018	0.97
After tedious rounds of IVF treatment, Remy and Papoose are finally pregnant. Now Remy wants to see their older kids move out of the house. As Jace's 18th birthday approaches he's expecting an epic house party but Remy has a better idea. guest stars: Amanda (Remy's mom), Irene (Papoose's mom), Juju
2	"Egg-xactly"	October 8, 2018	0.97
In an effort to convince the adult kids to move out before the baby arrives, Remy takes them to North Carolina to explore the option of them living on their own. guest stars: Coach Nelson (boxing trainer), Amanda (Remy's mom), Raemonique (Remy's sister), Remeesha (Remy's sister), Irene (Papoose's mom)
3	"Dadchelor Party"	October 15, 2018	0.98
Papoose decides to honor the "Golden Child” with fresh ink and a heartfelt record, while Remy-Ma-tha pulls no punches when she surprises Papoose with a "dad-chelor party". guest stars: Fat Joe, Yandy, David Pracise (tattoo artist), DJ Kay Slay (producer), Maino, Safaree, Jaquáe

== Development ==
On December 18, 2017, Remy and Papoose starred in their own holiday special, Remy & Papoose: A Merry Mackie Holiday. The show would make its series premiere on October 1, 2018.
