= Stevie J & Joseline: Go Hollywood =

- Genre: Reality
- Directed by: Earl "Slick 23" Barlow
- Starring: Stevie J; Joseline Hernandez
- Theme music composer: Hunnit
- Opening theme: "King Vs. Queen" (feat. Kornblum Charlie)
- Country of origin: United States
- Original language: English
- No. of seasons: 1
- No. of episodes: 8

Production
- Executive producers: Mona Scott-Young; Stephanie R. Gayle; Toby Barraud; Stefan Springman; Mala Chapple; Carmen Mitcho; Lashan Browning; Stevie J; Susan Levison; Nina L. Diaz; Ken Martinez; Vivian Gomez
- Running time: 20–23 minutes
- Production companies: Eastern TV; Monami Entertainment

Original release
- Network: VH1
- Release: January 25 – March 21, 2016

Related
- Love & Hip Hop: Atlanta; K. Michelle: My Life; Leave It to Stevie

Stevie J & Joseline: Go Hollywood is a reality television series featuring Stevie J and Joseline Hernandez. The show premiered on January 25, 2016 on VH1 and is the second spin-off of Love & Hip Hop: Atlanta.

== Series synopsis ==
=== Overview and casting ===
Stevie J & Joseline: Go Hollywood chronicles the lives of Stevie and Joseline in Los Angeles, California as they prepare for their movie project That Time of the Month.

Several members of Stevie J's family appear as supporting cast members in green screen confessional interview segments throughout the series. They include Stevie's children Stevie Jordan Jr., Sade Jordan and Savannah Jordan and Stevie's ex-girlfriend and Love & Hip Hop: Atlanta co-star Mimi Faust. P. Diddy, K. Michelle, Stevie's friend Tony DeNiro, porn star Skin Diamond, Grammy Award-winning singer Faith Evans, reality star Brandi Glanville, choreographer Laurieann Gibson, Stevie's oldest son Dorian Jordan, basketball player Tamera Young, radio host Big Boy, Russell Simmons, Stevie Jr. and Savannah's mother Carol Antoinette Bennett, Stevie's mother Penny Daniels, Stevie's father Moses Jordan and Stevie's youngest daughter at the time, Eva Jordan, would make guest appearances.

The series was picked up for a second season, but did not return due to Stevie and Joseline's separation. Instead, Stevie went on to star in a solo series, Leave It to Stevie, which premiered on December 19, 2016, and Joseline starred in her own special, Joseline's Special Delivery, which premiered on May 1, 2017 and documented the birth of their child.

== Episodes ==
No.	Title	Original release date	U.S. viewers (millions)
1	"L.A., The Stevie J Way"	January 25, 2016	2.55
Grammy-award winning producer, Stevie J, heads to L.A. on his own to produce his upcoming movie, That Time of the Month. Little does he know, his wife and potential co-star Joseline flew west as well. guest stars: Tony DeNiro (entrepreneur), K. Michelle, Christopher Cass (acting coach), Tim Hildebrand (acting student), Sean "Puff Daddy" Combs, Paige Barone (co-executive producer), Sam Osceola (executive producer), Mike Stokes (executive producer)
2	"The Truth Hurts"	February 1, 2016	2.13
Stevie has a secret to tell Joseline but struggles with how to drop the bomb. He's worried about upsetting her while they are working on fixing their relationship. guest stars: Tony DeNiro (entrepreneur), Kelly Holland (president, Penthouse), Tommy O (photographer), Reef (creative director), Skin Diamond (Penthouse pet), Dr. Don Etkes (Ph.D., MFT)
3	"The Jordan Clan"	February 8, 2016	2.11
Stevie J.'s kids arrive in LA. guest stars: Faith Evans (recording artist), Bob Corff (dialect coach), Brandi Glanville (TV personality), Ryan Manning (Dr. of Chiropractic); This is the first episode featuring Stevie Jr., Sade and Savannah.
4	"Joseline Goes PG"	February 22, 2016	2.12
Frustrated with her manager-husband, Joseline books a performance at a G-rated event in Los Angeles on her own. guest stars: Renata Medina (festival director), Laurieann Gibson (director/choreographer), Zion (Stevie's grandson), Dorian (Stevie's son), Ricardo (choreographer)
5	"Risky Business"	February 29, 2016	1.90
Joseline decides to find a new manager. guest stars: Laurieann Gibson (director/choreographer), Dorian (Stevie's son), Tamera Young (WNBA player - Chicago Sky), Big Boy (Host, Real 92.3 LA), Ricardo (choreographer), David Weintraub (CEO, DWE Talent Mgmt.) cameo: Zion
6	"Take Me to Church"	March 7, 2016	1.71
Stevie is searching for peace in his family, but Joseline's latest snub leaves the Jordans further apart than ever. guest stars: Russell Simmons (hip hop mogul), Dorian (Stevie's son), Zion (Stevie's grandson), Antoinette Bennett (Stevie Jr. & Savannah's mom), Penny Daniels (Stevie's mom), Bishop Clarence McClendon (Full Harvest Int'l Church); This is the last episode featuring Sade.
7	"That Time of the Month"	March 14, 2016	0.98
Stevie and Joseline's movie is back on track but the couple's flawed relationship stands in the way of making a Hollywood blockbuster. Mimi visits L.A with Eva. guest stars: Tony DeNiro (entrepreneur), Moses Jordan (Stevie's father), Eva Jordan (Stevie's daughter), Sagiv Binyamin (instructor, Cirque School), Kimberly Hardin (casting director), Paige Barone (co-executive producer); This is the first episode featuring Mimi.
8	"ATL or Bust"	March 21, 2016	1.87
Joseline is loving L.A. but Stevie has some loose ends to tie up back in Atlanta. guest stars: Dorian (Stevie's son), Faith Evans (recording artist), Tay & Lauren (glam squad)
