= Love & Hip Hop: New York =

American reality television series (2011–2020)

- Genre: Reality television
- Created by: Mona Scott-Young
- Directed by: David Wolfgang; Josh Richards
- Starring: Chrissy Lampkin; Emily Bustamante; Olivia Longott; Somaya Reece; Kimbella Vanderhee; Yandy Smith-Harris; Erica Mena; Jen the Pen; Raqi Thunda; Winter Ramos; Rashidah Ali; Tahiry Jose; Tara Wallace; Erica Jean; Amina Buddafly; K. Michelle; Cyn Santana; Chrissy Monroe; Cardi B; Miss Moe Money; Sexxy Lexxy; Mariahlynn; Remy Ma; Bianca Bonnie; Felicia "Snoop" Pearson; Juju C.; Anaís; Lil' Mo; Papoose; Joe Budden; Juelz Santana; Rich Dollaz; Safaree Samuels
- Opening theme: "This Is the Life" Instrumental
- Composer: Lofey
- Country of origin: United States
- Original language: English
- No. of seasons: 10
- No. of episodes: 143 (list of episodes)

Production
- Executive producers: Mona Scott-Young; Stefan Springman; Stephanie Gayle; David DiGangi; Vivian Gomez; Nina L. Diaz; Josh Richards; Kim Osorio; Toby Barraud; Mala Chapple; D Renard Young
- Producer: Vivian Gomez
- Running time: 20 to 23 minutes (s. 1); 42 to 44 minutes (s. 2–10)
- Production companies: Monami Productions; Eastern TV (s. 1–9) Big Fish Entertainment (s. 10)

Original release
- Network: VH1
- Release: March 6, 2011 – March 9, 2020

Related
- Love & Hip Hop: Atlanta; Love & Hip Hop: Hollywood; Love & Hip Hop: Miami; Chrissy & Mr. Jones; K. Michelle: My Life; Stevie J & Joseline: Go Hollywood; Leave It to Stevie; Remy & Papoose: Meet the Mackies

Love & Hip Hop: New York (originally titled Love & Hip Hop) is an American reality television series that premiered March 6, 2011 on VH1. The series chronicles the lives of several people in New York City (and nearby areas, including New Jersey, and Yonkers), involved with hip hop music, and features appearances from notable figures associated with East Coast hip hop.

The show's success would spawn a franchise of spin-offs; including Love & Hip Hop: Atlanta, Chrissy & Mr. Jones, Love & Hip Hop: Hollywood, K. Michelle: My Life, Stevie J & Joseline: Go Hollywood, Leave It to Stevie, Love & Hip Hop: Miami and Remy & Papoose: Meet the Mackies.

The show's tenth season and final season premiered on December 16, 2019. A "mid-season" finale aired on March 9, 2020, as production on the franchise was postponed indefinitely due to the COVID-19 pandemic, but the remaining episodes never aired. In the years since, several cast members would appear in various spin-offs, crossovers, and limited series, as part of a "reimagining" of the franchise. New York's cast would also join Love & Hip Hop: Atlanta during its tenth season.

== Series synopsis ==
=== Overview and casting ===
Love & Hip Hop: New York revolves around the everyday lives of women working in the male-dominated world of hip hop. The first two seasons focus on the personal and professional struggles of four women, two of which are girlfriends of famous rappers, and two are aspiring recording artists. Subsequent seasons expanded to include talent managers and producers, DJs and radio personalities, stylists, video vixens, glamour models and groupies. The show has a sprawling supporting cast, consisting mostly of men in the industry, who (in most cases) share the same amount of screen time and storyline focus as the show's leads.

The first season starred Chrissy Lampkin, girlfriend of Jim Jones, Emily Bustamante, girlfriend of Fabolous, Olivia and Latin artist Somaya Reece. Jim Jones, his mother Nancy Jones, Somaya's manager Maurice Aguilar and Olivia's manager Rich Dollaz appeared in supporting roles. Swizz Beatz's ex-wife Mashonda would appear in a minor supporting role for three episodes. All main cast members from the previous season returned for a second season, along with new cast members Kimbella Vanderhee, the girlfriend of Juelz Santana, and Yandy Smith, Jim Jones' manager. Teairra Marí and video vixen Erica Mena appeared as supporting cast members.

The show underwent major cast changes in season three after last season's reunion special, in which all four original cast members accused their producers of manipulating storylines for drama. On September 7, 2012, VH1 announced that Chrissy Lampkin and Jim Jones would leave the show to star in their own spin-off show Chrissy & Mr. Jones, along with Emily Bustamante and Jim's mother Nancy Jones. Somaya Reece quit the show all together, while Olivia Longott's role would be diminished significantly, appearing only as a supporting cast member. Rich Dollaz and Yandy Smith were the only major cast members from the first two seasons to remain on the show, with Yandy taking over for Chrissy as the lead. Erica Mena was promoted to the main cast, along with author and former hip hop groupie Winter Ramos, who had a brief guest appearance last season. They were joined by video vixen Tahiry Jose, radio personalities Raqi Thunda and Jen the Pen and "celebrity stiletto expert" Rashidah Ali. Joe Budden, Yandy's boyfriend Mendeecees Harris, Consequence and rapper Lore'l appeared as supporting cast members, with Joe's girlfriend Kaylin Garcia appearing in a minor supporting role. Former main cast member Kimbella Vanderhee returned as a guest star for two episodes.

The cast retooling had a mixed reception from audiences with the season garnering the lowest ratings in the franchise's history at that point, and the cast was once again retooled in season four, with only Yandy, Erica Mena and Tahiry returning from last season's main cast. They were joined by Tara Wallace, girlfriend of Peter Gunz, Amina Buddafly, Erica Jean, Saigon's baby mama, and Love & Hip Hop: Atlanta's K. Michelle. Peter Gunz appeared as a supporting cast member, along with stripper Nya Lee, Saigon and Erica's girlfriend Cyn Santana. Former main cast member Rashidah Ali appeared as a guest star in several episodes. The much publicised love triangle storyline involving Peter Gunz, Tara and Amina (reminiscent of the more popular Love & Hip Hop: Atlanta) lead to ratings improving significantly, with the season attracting an average of 3 million total viewers per episode.

K. Michelle left the show to star in her own spin-off K. Michelle: My Life. Saigon and Erica Jean were fired, and Tahiry and Joe quit the series while season five had begun filming. Season five saw the promotion of Cyn Santana to the main cast, along with Chrissy Monroe, girlfriend of Chink Santana. Mendeecees, who spent the previous season incarcerated, would return as a supporting cast member, along with producer Cisco Rosado, who made guest appearances in season three. Chink, Darryl Strawberry's daughter Diamond Strawberry, rapper Precious Paris and singer Jhonni Blaze would round out the supporting cast. Later in the season, Rashidah also began appearing in a supporting capacity, while Kimbella returned as a guest star for four episodes.

On July 7, 2015, shortly after her release from prison, Remy Ma announced that she was joining the show for season six, along with her husband Papoose. The cast would undergo a major cast change for the third time in the show's history, with only Yandy, Tara and Amina returning from last season's main cast. They were joined by Remy, social media personality Cardi B and up-and-coming rappers Mariahlynn and Miss Moe Money and Sexy Lexxy of the rap duo BBOD. The season's storylines focused more on the struggles of female rappers in the industry than ever before. Papoose would appear as a supporting cast member, along with radio personality DJ Self, his girlfriend Yorma Hernandez, and rapper Bianca Bonnie. Rose, a stylist who has an affair with Self, appeared in a minor supporting role. Mendeecees returned to prison during filming, and from that point, would only make appearances via phone calls for the rest of the show's run.

In season seven, Kimbella Vanderhee returned as a series regular after being absent from the show since the second season. Bianca Bonnie was promoted to the main cast, along with The Wire star Felicia "Snoop" Pearson. After a controversial storyline last season involving their duelling pregnancies, Tara and Amina were phased out of the show, appearing only as supporting cast members. One of the season's leading storylines was the violent feud between Yandy and Mendeecees' baby mamas Samantha Wallace and Erika DeShazo, as they battle for custody over Mendeecees' children. Samantha and Erika would join the supporting cast, along with Samantha's mother Kim Wallace and Mendeecees' mother Judy Harris. The season's supporting cast, the largest in the show's history so far, would also include Juelz Santana, Juju C., fiancée of Cam'ron, Snoop's girlfriend J. Adrienne, radio personality DJ Drewski and his girlfriend Sky Landish, Cardi's sister Hennessy Carolina and producer Swift Star. Singers Sofi Green and Major Galore, Rich's daughter Ashley Trowers, his girlfriend Jade Wifey and Swift's girlfriend Asia Cole appeared in minor supporting roles. Love & Hip Hop: Hollywood star Moniece Slaughter made a special crossover appearance in two episodes.

On December 30, 2016, Cardi B announced she was leaving the show to focus on her rap career. Kimbella and Juelz broke up, and subsequently quit the show while season eight had begun filming. Season eight saw the promotion of Juju to the main cast, alongside newcomers Anaís and Lil' Mo. Love & Hip Hop: Hollywood's Safaree Samuels, Karl Dargan, Navarro Gray, his girlfriend Ashley Diaz, her sister Ayisha Diaz, rapper Jaquáe, video vixen Sophia Body, Bad Girls Club star DreamDoll, rapper Brittney Taylor, singer James R., K. Michelle: My Life's Jonathan Fernandez and singer Trent Crews would join the supporting cast. Grafh and rapper Kiyanne would also appear in supporting roles. Hennessy would return as a supporting cast member for one episode, while Peter Gunz appeared as a guest star in three episodes. After the season's poor reception, it was reported that producers were revamping the cast. Bianca and Mariahlynn confirmed on social media that this season would be their last, after a public fallout between the two girls.

After a four-year hiatus, it was announced that Cyn Santana and Joe Budden would return to the show in season nine, along with Kimbella and Juelz Santana, with rapper Maino joining the cast. On November 5, 2018, VH1 released a promo confirming that Rich Dollaz, after appearing as a supporting cast member in every season prior, had finally been promoted to main cast, along with Budden, Papoose, Juelz and Safaree. Mariahlynn, Anaís and Nya Lee would return to the show as supporting cast members, along with Maino, his girlfriend Maggie Carrie, Love & Hip Hop: Hollywood's Alexis Skyy and transgender rapper Sidney Starr.

On September 12, 2019, it was reported that several former cast members had begun filming the show for its tenth anniversary season, with Big Fish Entertainment taking over the show from Eastern TV. After a seven-year hiatus, Chrissy Lampkin and Jim Jones would return to franchise, along with Olivia Longott, Somaya Reece, Erica Mena and Tahiry Jose. Mama Jones, Cisco Rosado and Peter Gunz would return later in the season. New cast members would include rappers Jennaske, Phresher and his girlfriend Jenn Coreano. Emily Bustamante was reportedly in talks to return but ultimately did not appear.

The show never returned after the COVID-19 pandemic, instead Yandy, Mendeecees, Erica Mena and Safaree were transferred to the cast of Love & Hip Hop: Atlanta to continue their storylines.

=== Cast timeline ===
Main cast (appears in opening credits)
Secondary cast (appears in green screen confessional segments and in end credits alongside the main cast)
Guest cast (appears in a guest role or cameo)

Cast member	Seasons									
Cast member	1	2	3	4	5	6	7	8	9	10
Chrissy Lampkin	Starring	Starring								Starring
Emily Bustamante	Starring	Starring								
Olivia Longott	Starring	Starring	Supporting							Supporting
Somaya Reece	Starring	Starring						Guest (Note: Appears in the Love & Hip Hop New York: Dirty Little Secrets special only.)		Supporting
Kimbella Vanderhee		Starring	Guest		Guest		Starring	Guest (Note: Appears in the Love & Hip Hop New York: Dirty Little Secrets and Love & Hip Hop: The Love Edition specials only.)	Starring	Starring
Yandy Smith-Harris	Cameo	Starring	Starring	Starring	Starring	Starring	Starring	Starring	Starring	Starring
Erica Mena		Supporting	Starring	Starring	Starring			Guest		Starring
Jen the Pen			Starring							
Raqi Thunda			Starring							
Winter Ramos		Guest	Starring							
Rashidah Ali			Starring	Guest	Supporting	Supporting				
Tahiry Jose			Starring	Starring				Guest		Supporting
Tara Wallace				Starring	Starring	Starring	Supporting	Cameo		
Erica Jean				Starring						
Amina Buddafly				Starring	Starring	Starring	Supporting			Guest
K. Michelle				Starring	Guest (Note: Appears in the Love & Hip Hop Live: The Wedding special only.)					
Cyn Santana				Supporting	Starring				Starring	Starring
Chrissy Monroe					Starring					
Cardi B						Starring	Starring			
Miss Moe Money						Starring				
Sexxy Lexxy						Starring				
Mariahlynn						Starring	Starring	Starring	Supporting	Cameo
Remy Ma						Starring	Starring	Starring	Starring	Starring
Bianca Bonnie						Supporting	Starring	Starring		
Felicia "Snoop" Pearson							Starring	Starring		
Juju C.						Cameo	Supporting	Starring	Starring	Supporting
Anaís								Starring	Supporting	Cameo
Lil' Mo								Starring		
Papoose						Supporting	Supporting	Supporting	Starring	Starring
Joe Budden			Supporting	Supporting					Starring	Starring
Juelz Santana	Cameo	Guest			Guest	Guest (Note: Appears in a bonus scene only.)	Supporting		Starring	Guest (Note: As Juelz was incarcerated during the filming of this season, he appears only via phone call conversations with Kimbella.)
Rich Dollaz	Supporting	Supporting	Supporting	Supporting	Supporting	Supporting	Supporting	Supporting	Starring	Starring
Safaree Samuels								Supporting	Starring	Starring

=== Storylines ===
Love & Hip Hop: New York explores the role of women in the male-dominated industry of hip hop, their relationship struggles, as well as the intense and violent rivalries between the women in New York's hip hop scene. Over the seasons, the show has explored addiction, substance abuse, race relations, colorism, religion and the impact of incarceration on black families.

Several female cast members identify as bisexual, lesbian or sexually fluid, and the show is one of the few television shows to explore LGBT issues from a black and Latino perspective. In season eight, openly gay stylist Jonathan Fernandez joins the cast and in one episode reveals the horrors he suffered as a child in conversion therapy in the Dominican Republic.

== Episodes ==
Season	Episodes	Originally released	
Season	Episodes	First released	Last released
1	9	March 6, 2011	May 16, 2011
2	11	November 14, 2011	February 6, 2012
3	14	January 7, 2013	April 15, 2013
4	14	October 28, 2013	February 10, 2014
5	17	December 15, 2014	April 13, 2015
6	14	December 14, 2015	March 28, 2016
7	16	November 21, 2016	February 27, 2017
8	18	October 30, 2017	March 12, 2018
9	16	November 26, 2018	March 18, 2019
10	14	December 16, 2019	March 9, 2020

== Development ==
In 2006, rapper Jim Jones approached VH1 executives to make a reality show about him. Jim Ackerman, senior vice president of development and production at the time, paired him with producers Stefan Springman and Toby Barraud of Eastern TV. Jones was unwilling to fully commit to the gruelling filming schedule and was dealing with the murder of a friend at the time, leading him to lash out violently at the producers and filming crew. The production issues were worked into the show's concept, which now focused on the culture clash between the gangsta rapper and the "honky" television producers. The 11-minute presentation tape, Keeping Up with the Joneses, also featured Jones' longtime girlfriend Chrissy Lampkin and his mother Nancy. According to Springman, VH1 loved the footage but were unsure if audiences would be invested in the concept full-time.

Jones' manager, Yandy Smith, approached Mona Scott-Young, her former employer at Violator, to retool the show. The concept was tweaked to include Jim's girlfriend Chrissy Lampkin and her circle of friends, influenced by the female ensemble-driven reality shows of the time. The original cast consisted of Lampkin, Olivia Longott, Swizz Beatz's ex-wife Mashonda Tifrere and Misa Hylton-Brim, the mother of Puffy Daddy's eldest son, pitched as a "black version of Sex and the City". Hylton was eventually replaced with stylist Emily Bustamante, the mother of Fabolous's son. Mashonda was downgraded to a supporting role per her request. Aspiring recording artist Somaya Reece was brought on late into production to replace her. Reece's ex Joe Budden was approached to appear in the first season, but declined.

The series was first announced in VH1's programming development report in April 2010, under the title Diary of a Hip Hop Girlfriend. On January 4, 2011, VH1 announced that Love & Hip Hop would debut on March 6, 2011.

== Reception ==
=== Critical response ===
The show's first season, which focused on the female cast's struggles within the male-dominated industry of hip hop, initially received a positive critical response. Jon Caramanica of The New York Times praised the show's deconstruction of the public image of rappers, as well as the quality of the production values with "slick, beautiful shots of the women driving spectacular cars with no men in sight". However, he was critical of the "needless filler drama" between Lampkin and Reese, a criticism that was shared by other critics who felt the "endless catty arguments and trashy behavior" detracted from the show's message and was too derivative of The Real Housewives franchise.

Subsequent seasons, particularly the spin-off Love & Hip Hop: Atlanta, have largely been overshadowed by criticism and controversy, with the franchise referred to as "ratchet TV" for its seemingly negative and stereotypical portrayal of black women and its focus on dysfunctional relationships, materialism, hyper-sexuality and violence. Series creator Mona Scott-Young has been singled out in particular for allegedly "exploiting (black women) in her quest for the almighty dollar". Scott-Young has continuously defended the show against these accusations, saying it was not created to represent all African-Americans: "It's set in a specific world and I don’t think that there’s anybody who’s navigated that world who would deny that these things happen.” Despite the criticism, the franchise has dominated the ratings since its inception, and has been described as "riveting", "addictive" "bawdy and hilarious" and a "guilty pleasure". In 2014, Complex named Joe Budden, Chrissy Lampkin and Mama Jones as some of the greatest VH1 reality stars of all time.

=== Scripting allegations ===
Love & Hip Hop is often criticized for appearing to fabricate much of its storyline. Scott-Young has denied those claims: “I can’t stress enough that the stuff they deal with on (Love & Hip Hop) is real. We may frame it within a production construct that allows us to shoot on a schedule, but we’re not making up the stuff that they’re going through.” She has admitted however that the show stages reactions of past events.

In October 2013, Peter Gunz admitted in an interview with Sway in the Morning to exploiting his romantic situation for a check, stating "I was gonna get busted (for cheating) anyway. Let me get paid to get busted. Fuck it." In December 2016, the show received criticism from fans after it was revealed that Yandy Smith and Mendeecees Harris were never legally married, despite taking part in a marriage ceremony live on VH1 as part of the special Love & Hip Hip Live: The Wedding. In an interview with The Breakfast Club in November 2017, Cam'ron outed Kimberly Osorio as a storyline writer for the show. In 2018, Cardi B admitted that her on-screen fling with DJ Self was contrived for television, saying "that was (just) some Love & Hip Hop shit".

=== Ratings ===
Love & Hip Hop is one of the highest rated unscripted franchises in cable television history. In an overview of the television cultural divide, The New York Times reported that Love & Hip Hop was most popular show in the black belt.

After a modest start, the show's audience grew substantially in its second season, averaging 2.8 million total viewers per episode, making it VH1's highest rated series in over three and a half years. Overall, the series was the #8 highest rating series on cable in 2011. However, following a cast retooling after nearly all of the original cast left the show, the show was met with mixed reception from audiences, with the third season garnering some of the lowest ratings in the franchise's history. Following another cast retooling and a much publicised love triangle storyline involving Peter Gunz, Tara and Amina (reminiscent of the more popular Love & Hip Hop: Atlanta), the show's ratings improved significantly, up 54% over the previous season's average and attracting an average of 3 million total viewers per episode. The show maintained a steady viewership of about two million viewers per episode for the next few seasons, until the poorly received eighth season, where ratings dipped below 2 million viewers for the first time in four years.

=== Cultural impact ===
During a speech at a campaign rally in North Carolina on November 4, 2016, President Barack Obama referenced the show, comparing the 2016 presidential race to reality television, saying "I mean, its like some Love & Hip Hop stuff."

On a 2013 episode of the BET television series The Game, Wendy Raquel Robinson's character Tasha makes reference to the franchise, saying "Back in the day we weren't carrying ourselves like them damn crazies you see on Love & Hip Hop, we conducted ourselves as upstanding women who were looked up to in the community". In the 2016 film Barbershop: The Next Cut, when Eve and Common's characters get into an argument over their relationship, Cedric the Entertainer's character makes a reference to the franchise, saying "This ain't no Love & Hip Hop reunion." In the 2017 pilot of the Netflix television adaptation Dear White People, a character attempts to break up an argument between two female characters by saying "Yo, fam, can we cut the Love & Hip Hop auditions and get to it?"

Nicki Minaj references the show on her remix of Ciara's "I'm Out". Remy Ma ends her diss track "Shether" with the line: "you just got bodied by a Love & Hip Hop bitch". Cardi B references her time on the show in her hit single "Bodak Yellow": "I just run and check the mail, another check from Mona Scott".

== Broadcast history ==
Love & Hip Hop's first season commenced airing on March 6, 2011. Initially intended to be an eight-episode series, the first season was expanded to nine episodes in order to include the first season reunion, which aired on May 16, 2011. On May 25, 2011, the series was renewed for a second season, which premiered on November 14, 2011.

The third season of Love & Hip Hop, now titled Love & Hip Hop: New York in promotional material, premiered on January 7, 2013, with nearly a whole new cast.

On October 10, 2013, VH1 announced Love & Hip Hop: New York would be returning for a fourth season on October 28, 2013. The season premiered back-to-back with the second season of Chrissy & Mr. Jones.

On December 2, 2014, VH1 announced that Love & Hip Hop: New York would be returning for a fifth season, which premiered on December 15, 2014.

On November 2, 2015, VH1 announced that Love & Hip Hop: New York would be returning for a sixth season, which premiered on December 14, 2015.

On November 14, 2016, VH1 announced that Love & Hip Hop: New York would be returning for a seventh season, which premiered on November 21, 2016.

On October 2, 2017, VH1 announced Love & Hip Hop: New York would be returning for an eighth season, which premiered on October 30, 2017.

On September 27, 2018, VH1 announced Love & Hip Hop: New York would be returning for a ninth season, which premiered on November 26, 2018.

On November 4, 2019, VH1 announced Love & Hip Hop: New York would be returning for a tenth season, which premiered on December 16, 2019

=== Spin-offs ===
On May 15, 2012, VH1 announced Love & Hip Hop: Atlanta, the Atlanta-based spin-off of Love & Hip Hop, would make its series premiere on June 18, 2012.

On September 7, 2012, VH1 announced that Chrissy Lampkin and Jim Jones would leave Love & Hip Hop, to star in their own spin-off show Chrissy & Mr. Jones. Jim's mother Nancy received her own web series, Mama Jones' World.

On August 18, 2014, VH1 announced Love & Hip Hop: Hollywood, the Los Angeles-based spin-off of Love & Hip Hop, would make its series premiere on September 15, 2014.

K. Michelle join the cast in season four, with her purpose on the show mainly served to set up her own spin-off series, as such, she appeared in infrequently and barely interacted with the rest of the cast. Her future co-stars on the show, Paris Phillips and Tracie Renee, appeared as guest stars. On October 15, 2014, VH1 announced the spin-off K. Michelle: My Life, starring cast member K. Michelle, would make its series premiere on November 3, 2014.

On December 2, 2015, VH1 announced the spin-off Stevie J & Joseline: Go Hollywood, starring Stevie J and Joseline Hernandez, would make its series premiere on January 25, 2016, back-to-back with the second season of K. Michelle: My Life.

On December 1, 2016, VH1 announced the spin-off Leave It to Stevie, starring Stevie J, would make its series premiere on December 19, 2016, back-to-back with the third season of K. Michelle: My Life.

On October 30, 2017, VH1 announced Love & Hip Hop: Miami, the Miami-based spin-off of Love & Hip Hop, would make its series premiere on January 1, 2018.

=== Specials ===
The fourth season was preceded by 40 Greatest Love & Hip Hop Moments, a 2-hour clip show hosted by Mona Scott-Young. The special aired on October 24, 2013, and showcased the franchise's most "shocking, scandalous and dramatic Love & Hip Hop moments", featuring clips from the show's first three seasons, as well as the first two seasons of its spin-off Love & Hip Hop: Atlanta.

On April 14, 2015, VH1 announced that Love & Hip Hop: The Wedding, a two-hour special featuring the marriage between cast members Yandy Smith and Mendeecees Harris, would air live on May 25, 2015. The special was preceded by six exclusive webisodes that were made available on VH1's website from May 12, 2015. The special aired to over 2 million viewers and featured appearances from other VH1 reality stars, including cast mates from Love & Hip Hop: Atlanta, Love & Hip Hop: Hollywood, Black Ink Crew, Mob Wives, as well as from Bravo's The Real Housewives of Atlanta.

On October 18, 2017, nearly two weeks before the season eight premiere, VH1 aired Dirty Little Secrets, a special featuring unseen footage and deleted scenes from the show's first seven seasons, along with interviews with the show's cast and producers.

On November 16, 2017, VH1 announced that Remy & Papoose: A Merry Mackie Holiday, a holiday special starring Remy Ma and Papoose, would air on December 18, 2017.

=== Game ===
On August 8, 2016, VH1 and 345 Games announced the release of Love & Hip Hop: The Game, a mobile game for iOS and Android. It was released worldwide on September 22, 2016.

=== Podcast ===
On November 26, 2018, the show's ninth season would be accompanied by an official podcast, Love & Hip Hop: The Tea, hosted by Jesse Janedy, TK Trinidad and Lem Gonsalves.

== Distribution ==
Love & Hip Hop episodes air regularly on VH1 in the United States. Episodes in the first season run from around 21–24 minutes, episodes in subsequent seasons run from around 41–44 minutes. The first two seasons were broadcast in standard definition, while subsequent seasons are broadcast in high definition. The series' episodes are also available on demand through the official VH1 website, as well as for digital download at the iTunes Store and Amazon.

VH1 have released the first four seasons, as well as the sixth season, on DVD. The fifth, seventh, eighth, ninth, and tenth seasons are currently only available on digital platforms.

Internationally, the first nine seasons are available on Hayu, with the first, fifth, sixth, seventh, eighth and ninth seasons released uncensored.

== See also ==
- Love & Hip Hop franchise
