= Chrissy Monroe =

American entrepreneur

- Born: Chrissy Monroe; September 7, 1972 (age 54); Baltimore, Maryland
- Occupations: Writer; columnist; actress; entrepreneur
- Years active: 2009–present
- Organization(s): Serving Looks & Survive To Thrive Global
- Honours: New York State Assembly Citation
- Website: servinglooks.shop

Chrissy Monroe is an American entrepreneur and reality television personality, best known for her appearance on the fifth season of VH1's Love & Hip Hop: New York.

== Early life ==
Monroe was born on September 7, 1972 in Baltimore, Maryland. She is a self described “Italian-American” despite being born and raised in Baltimore and never possessing Italian citizenship. She has described her childhood as being rough, including enduring homelessness as a teen. She started her television career as a regular fixture on the late night dance show "Shakedown", and in minor roles on a Baltimore City Cable soap opera at Mo'Nique's Comedy Club. She moved to New York at the age of 29, where she became a brand ambassador for Pabst Brewing Company, and made appearances on Michael Moore's The Awful Truth. She subsequently launched her own talent and modelling development company called LeJeu Entertainment.

== Career ==
In 2014, Monroe joined the cast of VH1's Love & Hip Hop: New York in season five, which chronicled her relationship struggles with rapper Chink Santana.

In 2015, Monroe joined the contributing staff of Hip Hop Weekly with her advice column, Love Talk with Chrissy Monroe.

In 2018, Monroe appeared in an episode of Dr. Phil, titled "Love, Hip Hop & Cyber-Stalking?".

== Philanthropy ==
In 2016, Monroe launched her own non-profit foundation Survive to Thrive Global, providing resources to domestic violence survivors. Monroe also serves on the board of directors of Celebrity Cat Walk, raising funds and awareness for National Animal Rescue, alongside Jamie Foxx, Nicole Richie and Melissa Rivers.
