= Black Buddafly =

German girl group

- Genres: R&B, soul
- Years active: 2005–Present
- Labels: Def Jam (2005–2007); MBK Records/J (2008–2010)
- Past members: Sophie Schmahl (2005–2006) Amina Buddafly (2005–Present) Jazz Buddafly (2005–Present)

Black Buddafly is a German R&B duo composed of twin sisters Aminata "Amina" and Safietou "Jazz" Schmahl, who are of Senegalese and German descent.

== Career ==
The sisters were born in 1983 to a German mother and a Senegalese father. They were discovered in 2002, along with their older sibling, Sophie, by producer and manager Orrin Ennis, who signed the sisters to Germany's RCA as a trio under the name Choyce. In 2005, they signed to Def Jam, releasing the singles "Rock-a-Bye" and "Bad Girl" with the rapper Fabolous. Sophie departed the group in 2006 and Amina and Jazz continued the group as a duo.

Black Buddafly eventually disbanded and Amina pursued a solo career. In 2013, she garnered attention as a cast member on Love & Hip Hop: New York.

== Discography ==
Year	Title	Chart Positions				Album
Year	Title	US Hot 100	US R&B/Hip-Hop	UK Singles Chart	AUS Top 50	Album
2005	"Rock-A-Bye"	—	#70	—	—	
2006	"Bad Girl" (feat. Fabolous)	—	#101	—	—	Waist Deep soundtrack
2020	"RAW"	—	—	—	—	2020
2020	"Match Made"	—	—	—	—	2020
2021	"Flawless Diamond" (feat. Lyfe Jennings)	—				

=== Mixtapes ===
- Worst Of.... Black Buddafly: 'The Forgotten MP3s (2011)
