= Erica Mena =

American actress, model, former television personality and video vixen (born 1987)

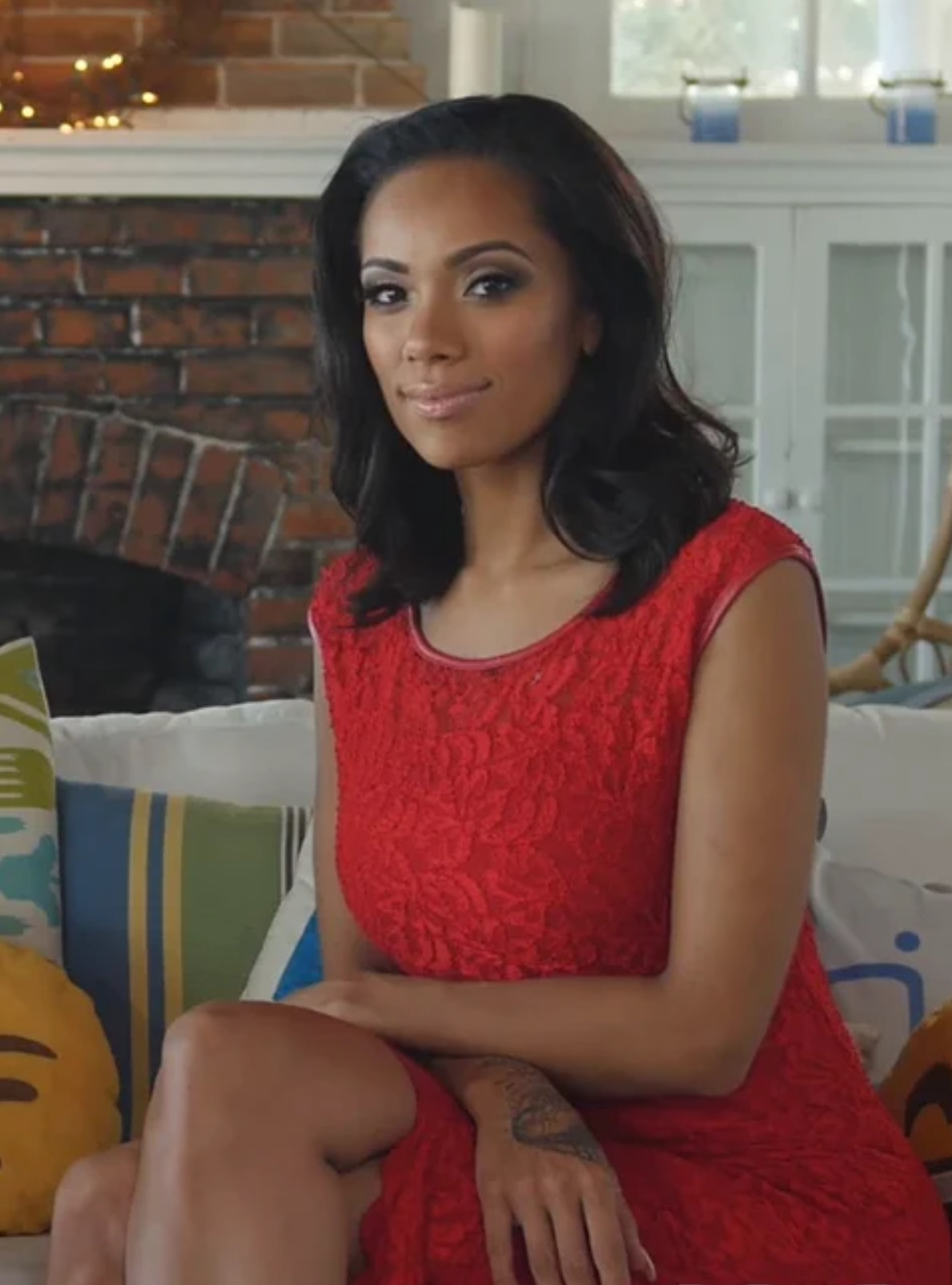
- Mena in 2015
- Born: Erica Jasmin Mena; November 8, 1987 (age 38); Newburgh, New York, U.S.
- Other name: Erica Mena Samuels
- Occupations: Television personality; actress; model; video vixen
- Years active: 2005–present
- Spouse: Safaree Samuels (m. 2019; div. 2022)
- Children: 3

Erica Jasmin Mena (born November 8, 1987) is an American television personality, actress, model and video vixen. Mena began her career as a video vixen, appearing in the music videos "Lean Back" by Terror Squad, and "Candy Shop" by 50 Cent, amongst others. Mena gained wider recognition after joining VH1's Love & Hip Hop: New York in 2011, where she remained in a prominent role until 2015. She would later join the cast of Love & Hip Hop: Atlanta from 2018 to 2023.

== Career ==
Mena first gained notoriety as a model and "video vixen", through her appearances in various hip hop music videos, for artists such as Chris Brown, Fabolous, Akon and Fat Joe. In 2009, while living in Miami, Florida, she would make regular appearances on the first season of Kourtney & Khloe Take Miami while she worked at the Kardashian sisters' DASH boutique.

In 2011, Mena would begin appearing on the VH1 reality series Love & Hip Hop: New York in a supporting role during the show's second season. The next year, she became a main cast member, and would remain in that position until 2015 when she announced her decision to leave the show, following her engagement to rapper Bow Wow.

In August 2017, VH1 announced that Mena would compete in the first season of VH1's Scared Famous, which premiered in October 2017. She was initially eliminated fourth, before re-entering the competition, and ultimately finishing in third place.

She has released two autobiographies, Chronicles of a Confirmed Bachelorette and Underneath It All. In 2018, Erica joined the cast of Love & Hip Hop: Atlanta for the seventh season. In 2019, she returned to Love & Hip Hop: New York for its tenth anniversary season.

Mena was fired from Love & Hip Hop: Atlanta in September 2023, after calling fellow cast member Spice a "blue monkey".

== Personal life ==
Mena is openly bisexual. Mena is of Dominican and Puerto Rican ancestry. She graduated from Newburgh Free Academy in Newburgh, NY. She has a son, King Javien Conde (b. March 1, 2007) with video director and rapper Raul Conde, a member of Fat Joe's Terror Squad. Conde died on November 22, 2023.

Mena was previously engaged to Bow Wow. In December 2018, Mena became engaged to rapper and television personality Safaree Samuels. On October 7, 2019, she and Samuels married at the Legacy Castle in New Jersey. Their daughter was born in 2020. On May 4, 2021, she announced that she and Samuels were expecting their second child together. On May 25, 2021, TMZ reported that Mena officially filed for divorce from Samuels. Their son was born in 2021.

== Controversies ==
In October 2018, Mena and boyfriend Clifford Dixon were arrested at Mena's Johns Creek, Georgia residence for a domestic dispute, with Dixon charged with criminal trespass and Mena charged with marijuana possession. The police were called when roommates were disturbed by the commotion upstairs when Dixon kicked down a bedroom door that Mena had locked to barricade herself. Both were released when posting bail.

In 2023, Mena was fired from Love & Hip Hop for using a racial slur. She later issued an apology.

== Filmography ==
=== Film ===
| Year | Title | Role | Notes |
|---|---|---|---|
| 2017 | Almost Amazing | Cara | |
| 2019 | I Got the Hook-Up 2 | Miss Peaches | |
| 2019 | Swag Inc. | Natasha | |
| 2022 | The Millennial | Lola Etienne | |
| 2022 | The Stepmother | Elizabeth Carter/Zoey | |
| 2022 | The Stepmother 2 | Elizabeth Carter/Zoey | |
| 2023 | The Assistant | Dr. Raven Fields | |
| 2023 | You're Not Alone | Beverly | |
| 2023 | The Stepmother 3 | Elizabeth Carter/Zoey | |
| 2023 | Picture Me Dead | Kristen | |
| 2025 | Run | Donnie Mena | |
| 2026 | Forever This Ring | Faith | |
| 2026 | Run 2 † | Donnie Mena | To be released |
| TBA | The Stepmother IV † | Elizabeth Carter/Zoey | Upcoming Tubi film |

=== Television ===
| Year | Legacy | Role | Notes |
|---|---|---|---|
| 2005 | VH1 News Presents | Herself | Episode: "Hip Hop Videos: Sexploitation on the Set" |
| 2009 | Kourtney & Khloe Take Miami | Herself/Dash Employee | Recurring cast (season 1) |
| 2011–14; 2019 | Love & Hip Hop: New York | Herself | Supporting cast (season 2); main cast (seasons 3–5, 10) |
| 2013 | The Show with Vinny | Herself | Episode: "Erica Mena & Austin Mahone" |
| 2015 | CSI: Cyber | Brody's Girl | Episode: "CMND:/Crash" |
| 2016 | Bad Girls Club 16: Social Disruption | Herself | Reunion Co-host |
| 2017 | Bad Girls Club 17: East Meets West | Herself | Reunion Co-host |
| 2017 | Scared Famous | Herself | Contestant |
| 2017 | Master of None | Nikki | Episode: "Thanksgiving" |
| 2018 | Hustle in Brooklyn | Herself | Recurring cast |
| 2018–19 | Hip Hop Squares | Herself | Recurring guest |
| 2018–23 | Love & Hip Hop: Atlanta | Herself | Main cast (seasons 7, 10–11); supporting cast (season 9) |
| 2021 | Sacrifice | Bella | Episode: "Mama Didn't Lie" |
| 2022–2023 | Hush | Gina | Main cast (seasons 1–2) |
| 2024–2025 | Joseline's Cabaret | Herself | Web show; guest (seasons 5–6) |
| 2025 | Two Ways with Erica Mena | Herself | Host |
| 2026 | The Real Housewives of Atlanta | Herself | Episode: "Rumors and Raised Eyebrows" |

=== Music videos ===
| 2003 | "Can't Stop, Won't Stop" | Young Gunz |
| 2004 | "Lean Back" | Terror Squad |
| 2004 | "Ain't Nothing Wrong" | Houston |
| 2004 | "Breathe" | Fabolous |
| 2005 | "Candy Shop" | 50 Cent featuring Olivia |
| 2005 | "Yo (Excuse Me Miss)" | Chris Brown |
| 2005 | "Tell Me" | Bobby Valentino |
| 2008 | "I'm So Paid" | Akon |
