= Juju Castaneda =

American novelist

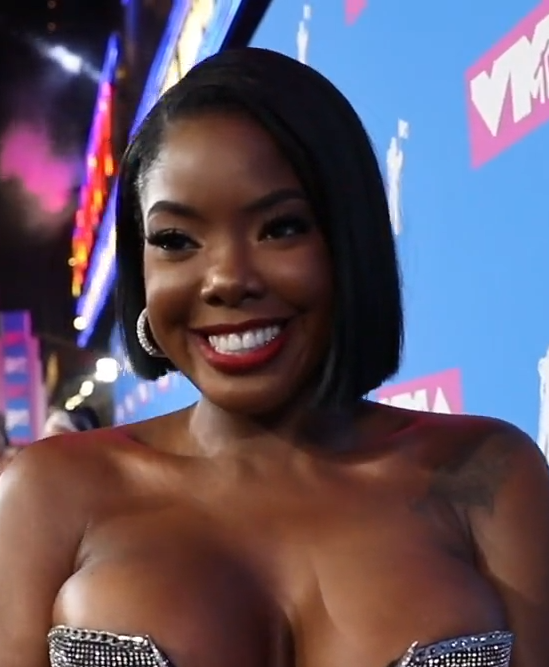
- Castaneda in 2018
- Born: Juliette Castaneda; March 21, 1981 (age 45); New York City, U.S.
- Education: Barry University (BA, MA)
- Occupations: Media personality; author; actress; businesswoman
- Years active: 2012–present
- Writing career
- Pen name: Juliet C.
- Genres: Urban fiction; drama; contemporary romance

Juliette "Juju" Castaneda (nickname Juju C.; pen name Juliet C.; born March 21, 1981) is an American media personality, author, actress and businesswoman. She rose to prominence as a main cast member of the VH1 reality television series Love & Hip Hop: New York and she subsequently appeared as a supporting cast member on its spin-off show, Love & Hip Hop: Miami. Castaneda released her debut novel, Secrets of a Jewel, in January 2017.

== Career ==
In 2012, Castaneda was reportedly approached by Mona Scott-Young to appear as a cast member on the third season of VH1's reality television series Love & Hip Hop: New York, but she turned it down. In April 2014, Castaneda was featured on rapper Cam'ron's track "Devil" and the song was later included in the extended play, 1st of the Month Vol. 3. She made her New York Fashion Week debut in the fall of 2014, walking for Mark McNairy.

In December 2016, Castaneda joined the supporting cast of the seventh season of Love & Hip Hop: New York after previously making an uncredited cameo in season 6. This season chronicled the launch of her debut novel Secrets of a Jewel. She was later promoted to the main cast for the eighth and ninth seasons of the show, which explored her adapting Secrets of a Jewel into a play, and her business ventures with fellow cast members Safaree and Jonathan Fernandez. Castaneda returned to the show as a supporting cast member for the tenth season. Additionally, Castaneda made several appearances on the first season of Love & Hip Hop: Miami as a friend of Amara La Negra.

In 2019, Castaneda made her transition into acting after being cast in the thriller film Don't Shoot the Messenger. She also made a minor appearance in the crime comedy I Got the Hook-Up 2.

== Personal life ==
Castaneda was born in Brooklyn, New York City. She was raised in Miami, Florida after her family relocated there shortly after her birth. Her parents are both Afro-Cuban immigrants who moved to the United States in 1980. She has an older brother, José Ernesto, and a sister, Jacquelyn, who is currently her manager. At the age of 16, Castaneda moved to Orlando and later worked as a security screener at Orlando International Airport. Castaneda attended Barry University, obtaining both a bachelor's degree in business and a master's degree in public administration. She is also a licensed real estate broker in Florida and the proprietor of a hair care and wig company, Candy Jewels Hair.

Castaneda is a fluent speaker of Spanish and English. She is a vegetarian.

After meeting rapper Cam'ron in 2002, the two began dating in 2008. The couple became engaged in 2013, but they later called off their engagement in 2017.

=== Activism ===
Castaneda is known for being outspoken about her Afro-Latina identity; she has been a proponent for addressing colorism and eurocentrism within the Latin community. She spoke out in support of Amara La Negra, who was criticised by another cast member for sporting an afro on the set of Love & Hip Hop: Miami. In 2018, she stated:

We're Afro-Latinas, we're here to stay, and we have little girls looking up to us. [...] My Afro-Latina identity is such a huge part of who I am and I know Amara is the same way. I don’t ever want this industry to beat that out of her or any other young woman. [...] I want her to be proud and to embrace her identity, with whatever makes her comfortable and makes her feel beautiful.

In 2016, Castaneda established My Precious Jewels, a nonprofit organization to help adolescent girls with self-confidence and self-acceptance. In March 2019, she raised $200,000 to donate to an orphanage in Cuba.

== Filmography ==
=== Film ===
Year	Title	Role	Notes	Ref.
2019	I Got the Hook-Up 2	Sunday	Direct-to-video	
2020	True To the Game 2	Magazine offer girl		
2021	Don't Shoot the Messenger	Kim		
2021	He Said She Said	Sequoia “KOI” Johnson		

=== Television ===
Year	Title	Role	Notes
2016–2020	Love & Hip Hop: New York	Herself	Uncredited cameo (season 6); supporting cast (seasons 7, 10); main cast (seasons 8–9): 38 episodes
2018	Love & Hip Hop: Miami	Herself	Supporting cast (season 1): 3 episodes
2018	Remy & Papoose: Meet the Mackies	Herself	Episode: "Meet the Mackies"
2019	Black Music Honors	Herself (host)	YouTube exclusive; "Social Media Lounge" segment

== Bibliography ==
- Secrets of a Jewel (January 31, 2017)
