= Love & Hip Hop: New York season 2 =

Love & Hip Hop: New York
- Season 2
- DVD cover
- Starring: Chrissy Lampkin; Emily Bustamante; Kimbella Vanderhee; Olivia Longott; Somaya Reece; Yandy Smith
- No. of episodes: 11

Release
- Original network: VH1
- Original release: November 14, 2011 – February 6, 2012

Season chronology
- ← Previous; Season 1 Next → Season 3

The second season of the reality television series Love & Hip Hop aired on VH1 from November 14, 2011, until February 6, 2012. The season was primarily filmed in New York City, New York. It was executively produced by Mona Scott-Young for Monami Entertainment, Toby Barraud and Stefan Springman for NFGTV, and Jim Ackerman and Jeff Olde for VH1.

The series chronicles the lives of several women and men in the New York area, involved in hip hop music. It consists of 11 episodes, including Reality Check, a reunion special hosted by Mona Scott-Young.

== Production ==
On May 25, 2011, VH1 announced that Love & Hip Hop would be returning for a second season. The series premiered on November 14, 2011. All main cast members from the previous season returned, along with new cast members Kimbella Vanderhee, the girlfriend of Juelz Santana, and Yandy Smith, Jim Jones' manager. Teairra Marí and Erica Mena appeared as supporting cast members.

The season was released on DVD in region 1 on June 26, 2012.

== Synopsis ==
Picking up where last season left off, Chrissy is still waiting for her dream wedding and struggling with Jim's commitment issues. Jim's mother Nancy has released a diss track "Psychotic" aimed at Chrissy, capitalizing off Chrissy's insult during a fight last season. Emily has finally left Fab, tired of his constant infidelity. Olivia's single "December" didn't exactly set fire to the charts like she hoped it would and she still can't get a record deal, much to the frustration of her manager Rich. Somaya is still hustling hard, trying to get her various business ventures off the ground, amid tensions with her manager Maurice.

Emily decides to have an "emancipation" party with the girls to celebrate her break-up with Fab. Yandy, Jim's manager of seven years, brings along Kimbella, a video vixen and the baby mama of Juelz Santana. During the party, Kimbella admits to having had sex with Fab three years ago, while Emily was pregnant with Fab's child. Chrissy reacts violently to this revelation, sucker punching Kimbella in the face and attempting to stomp her head into the ground before being pulled away by security. Chrissy blames Yandy for the fiasco and Yandy's relationship with Chrissy and Jim begins to disintegrate.

Meanwhile, Somaya reaches a breaking point and fires Maurice. Olivia struggles with her identity as a recording artist. Emily tries to transition to single life with help from her friend, singer Teairra Marí. However, after Fab turns up at Emily's fashion show, she takes him back. Kimbella is dealing with Juelz' infidelity and her own lingering issues with her mother when she encounters a new enemy in Erica Mena, a fellow video vixen and model.

Chrissy leaves New York with the girls for Miami, after making it clear to Jim that she is not willing to wait much longer for his commitment. Jim follows and surprises Chrissy with a touching proposal. However, her happiness is short-lived when she comes face to face with Yandy at a night club and all hell breaks loose. The season ends with Emily taking a stand with Fab, Kimbella coming to a crossroads with Juelz, Somaya leaving New York for Los Angeles, Olivia refusing to compromise her career for a record deal and Jim and Chrissy severing their relationship with Yandy for good.

=== Reception ===
The season garnered big ratings for the network, averaging 2.8 million total viewers per episode, making it VH1's highest rated series in over three and a half years. Overall, the series was the #8 highest rating series on cable in 2011.

== Cast ==
=== Starring ===
- Chrissy Lampkin (11 episodes)
- Emily Bustamante (11 episodes)
- Kimbella Vanderhee (11 episodes)
- Olivia Longott (11 episodes)
- Somaya Reece (7 episodes)
- Yandy Smith (11 episodes)

=== Also starring ===
- Jim Jones (10 episodes)
- Rich Dollaz (8 episodes)
- Maurice Aguilar (2 episodes)
- Nancy "Mama" Jones (8 episodes)
- Teairra Marí (7 episodes)
- Erica Mena (6 episodes)

Juelz Santana, Somaya's investor Barry, Mama Jones' friend and producer Freddie Robinson Jr. and executive producer Mona Scott-Young appear in several episodes as guest stars. The show also features minor appearances from notable figures within the hip hop industry and New York's social scene, including Emily's daughter Taina Williams, Midi Mafia's Swift, Fabolous, Kimbella's mother Sherry Vanderhee, Rico Love, Cam'ron, Winter Ramos, Funkmaster Flex and Jerry "Wonda" Duplessis, along with uncredited cameos from DJ Self, Lil' Kim, Jonathan Fernandez, Monie Love and Freekey Zekey.

== Episodes ==
No. overall	No. in season	Title	Original release date	US viewers (millions)
10	1	"Still Look Pretty"	November 14, 2011	2.56
Chrissy still doesn't have a ring on her finger and Jim has already lost his. Emily has finally found the resolve to call it quits with Fab. A fight breaks out when Kimbella comes clean to Emily. guest stars: Taina (Emily's daughter), Juelz Santana (Dipset), Barry (investor), Freddie Robinson Jr. (producer) cameo: DJ Self; Kimbella and Yandy join the cast and are added to the opening credits.
11	2	"Bitch, I'm Fuego"	November 21, 2011	2.78
In the aftermath of the fight that went down at Emily's emancipation party, everyone tries to make sense of it all but battle lines are beginning to emerge. Yandy gives Chrissy a self-help book aimed at troublesome in-laws. Somaya and Maurice's tensions explode. guest stars: Calvin Cabrera (hype man), Barry (investor)
12	3	"A Toast To Kimbella"	November 28, 2011	2.92
Trying to help Emily transition into single life, Teairra drags her to an industry event, which turns out to be a party celebrating Kimbella's cover photo on "Black Men's Magazine" photographed by Suliman Hasan. guest stars: Barry (investor), Swift (Midi Mafia), Theresa (realtor), Kurt Erman (owner of Notations) cameo: Lil' Kim, Jonathan Fernandez; Teairra Marí joins the supporting cast.
13	4	"Fizzy-chotic"	December 5, 2011	2.38
Olivia reveals her troubled relationship with her mom. Meanwhile, Jim's mom Nancy is working hard to improve relations with Chrissy. Kimbella also tries to make up with Emily by throwing her a party. guest stars: Wayne Williams (Sony Music, A&R)
14	5	"Emily's 'Fabolous' Life"	December 12, 2011	2.28
Emily's new life as a single working mom takes off when she lands a high profile styling job during New York's fashion week. But when Fab shows up to support her, everyone begins to wonder just how "single" she really is. guest stars: Jeris Higgins (Emily's "date"), Freddie, Rob (party promoter), Yolanda Geralds (video director), Fabolous (Emily's ex); Although credited, Somaya does not appear.
15	6	"Bottle Service"	December 26, 2011	2.70
Jim buys himself a fancy new car which doesn't sit well with Chrissy who is still waiting for her fancy new ring. When Yandy brings Erica to have drinks with the girls, things take an unexpected turn. guest stars: Juelz Santana, James Billings (artist relations), Justin Haynes (general manager), Cookie (Chrissy's aunt), Ralph (Chrissy's uncle), Jackie (Olivia's cousin); Erica Mena joins the supporting cast. Although credited, Somaya does not appear.
16	7	"These Are The Breaks"	January 2, 2012	2.81
Chrissy gives in to pent up frustration and questions her relationship with Jim. To clear her head, she takes off to Miami with Emily and Olivia. However, Jim has a secret plan to win her back. guest stars: Juelz Santana; Although credited, Somaya does not appear.
17	8	"Miami Vice"	January 9, 2012	3.41
Jim surprises Chrissy in Miami with a touching proposal. Teairra and Olivia are both being courted by producer Rico Love, creating instant tensions. All hell breaks loose when Yandy and Chrissy come face to face. guest stars: Rico Love (producer), Sherry Vanderhee (Kimbella's mother); Although credited, Somaya does not appear.
18	9	"Back To Reality"	January 16, 2012	3.03
The girls come back to New York and recap the dramatic events of Miami. Olivia struggles to pick sides when Chrissy gives her an ultimatum. Kimbella and Somaya confront Erica at the club after she slams Kimbella in an interview. guest stars: Starrene Rhett (Vibe.com), Mona Scott-Young (CEO, Monami Ent.), Cam'ron, Kenneth Vanderhee (Kimbella's brother), Winter Ramos (Fab's ex-assistant) cameo: Freekey Zekey, Albee Yours
19	10	"At The End of the Day"	January 23, 2012	3.14
Olivia meets with DJ Funk Master Flex hoping she'll be able to move forward by confronting her harshest critics. Kimbella reaches a breaking point with Juelz. Yandy struggles to adjust to life without Jim. Jim and Chrissy go on vacation. guest stars: Funkmaster Flex, Jerry Wonda (composer/producer), Sherry Vanderhee (Kimbella's mother), Freddie, Mona Scott-Young (Founder, Monami Ent.)
20	11	"Reality Check"	February 6, 2012	2.30
In revealing one-on-one interviews, the cast and crew come together to speak frankly about this season's explosive behind-the-scenes drama and answer all of the burning questions that the fans want to know. host: Mona Scott-Young, Stefan Springman (segments with Chrissy)

== Webisodes ==
=== Bonus scenes ===
Deleted and extended scenes from the season's episodes were released weekly as bonus content on VH1's official website.

One scene features Maino, who would join the cast in a larger role in season nine.

List of Love & Hip Hop: New York Season 2 bonus scenes

Episode	Title	Featured cast members	Ref
1	"Reunion" (Extended scene)	Emily, Chrissy, Olivia, Somaya	
1	"Girl Talk" (Extended scene)	Emily, Chrissy, Olivia, Somaya, Kimbella, Yandy	
1	"Harlem Lanes"	Olivia, Maino	
2	"La Jefa" (Extended scene)	Chrissy, Emily, Olivia, Yandy	
2	"Maurice is Out"	Maurice, Barry	
2	"Somaya's Extended Performance" (Extended scene)	Somaya	
3	"Jim's Signature"	Yandy, Jim Jones	
3	"Diamonds are Forever" (Extended scene)	Chrissy, Jim Jones	
3	"Teairra in the House" (Extended scene)	Emily, Teairra	
4	"Stars in the City" (Extended scene)	Chrissy, Jim Jones	
4	"The Spelling Error"	Mama Jones, Peter	
4	"Emily's a Prude" (Extended scene)	Emily, Olivia, Somaya, Kimbella, Teairra	
5	"Catwalk Queens"	Emily, Samantha Black	
5	"Juelz Scores Some Jewels"	Yandy, Juelz Santana	
6	"Bonding Time"	Chrissy, Mama Jones	
6	"Health Kick"	Chrissy, Jim Jones	
7	"The Ring"	Jim Jones, Juelz Santana	
7	"Mama Talk"	Jim Jones, Mama Jones	
7	"Fight Review" (Extended scene)	Teairra, Olivia, Chrissy, Emily	
8	"Walk Away Full Version" (Extended scene)	Olivia	
8	"Attack the Pain" (Extended scene)	Olivia, Rich, Rico Love	
9	"Cold Treatment" (Extended scene)	Yandy, Mama Jones	
9	"Kim and Erica's Fight Continues" (Extended scene)	Erica, Kimbella, Somaya	
9	"Erica's Vibe Magazine Interview" (Extended scene)	Erica, Starrene Rhett	
10	"Nude Beach"	Mama Jones, Joy	
10	"The Psychic"	Kimbella, Joshua the Psychic	

== Music ==
Several cast members had their music featured on the show and released singles to coincide with the airing of the episodes.

List of songs performed and/or featured in Love & Hip Hop: New York season two
Title	Performer	Album	Episode(s)	Notes	Ref
We Fly High (feat. Juelz Santana)	Jim Jones	Hustler's P.O.M.E. (Product of My Environment)	1	performed onstage	
Psychotic	Mama Jones	single	1, 2, 5, 10	featured in music video performed onstage	
Fuego (feat. Bruce Waynne)	Somaya Reece	Rebel With A Cause	2	performed in rehearsal and onstage	
Fiesta	Somaya Reece	Rebel With A Cause	2	performed onstage	
I Ain't Going Nowhere (feat. Gabby B)	Somaya Reece	Rebel With A Cause	2	performed onstage	
Sponsor (feat. Gucci Mane & Soulja Boy)	Teairra Marí	At That Point	3	featured in music video	
Comin' Home (feat. Rugz D. Bewler)	Jim Jones	single	4	performed in scene	
Walk Away	Olivia	single	8	performed onstage	
Cold World (feat. Rod Rhaspy)	Cam'ron	Boss of All Bosses 3	9	played in studio session	
