= Love & Hip Hop =

American music media franchise

- Original title screen (2011)
- Genre: Reality television
- Created by: Mona Scott-Young
- Country of origin: United States
- Original language: English

Production
- Running time: 41–44 minutes

Original release
- Network: VH1; MTV; BET

Related
- Love & Hip Hop: New York; Love & Hip Hop: Atlanta; Love & Hip Hop: Hollywood; Love & Hip Hop: Miami

Love & Hip Hop is a media franchise that consists of several reality television series broadcast on VH1, MTV and BET. The shows document the personal and professional lives of several hip hop and R&B musicians, performers, managers, and record producers residing in various metropolitan areas of the United States. The original installment premiered on March 6, 2011, and its success resulted in spin-offs based in Atlanta, Hollywood, and Miami.

The franchise is known for its sprawling ensemble cast, with over 250 cast members. Many are notable figures in hip hop, including Jim Jones, Remy Ma, Soulja Boy, Waka Flocka Flame, Lil Scrappy, Trina and Trick Daddy, as well as R&B artists like Ray J, Keyshia Cole and dancehall artist Spice. It has been responsible for launching the careers of previously unknown artists, including Joseline Hernandez, K. Michelle, Cardi B and DreamDoll.

Love & Hip Hop has generated controversy since its inception, and is often criticized for tending towards a narrative format more commonly seen in scripted genres such as soap operas, and appearing to fabricate much of its story line. It has since become one of the highest rated unscripted franchises in cable television history, and has been described as a "guilty pleasure".

Installments of the franchise aired continuously from May 5, 2014, until May 11, 2020, with the "main" installments airing nearly every Monday on VH1. Love & Hip Hop: Atlanta is usually aired in spring and through summer, followed by Love & Hip Hop: Hollywood in the fall and Love & Hip Hop: New York and Love & Hip Hop: Miami in the winter. Production on Love & Hip Hop was shut down in early 2020 due to the COVID-19 pandemic, taking the franchise off the air for the first time in 6 years.

Love & Hip Hop would return in 2021 through a series of specials, spin offs, and limited series featuring cast members from all four installments. New seasons of Atlanta and Miami would begin airing from July 5 of that year.

As of November 21, 2022, 485 original episodes of New York, Atlanta, Hollywood and Miami have aired over 30 seasons.

In May 2026, it was announced that Love & Hip Hop would conclude after a 15 year run. A six-part limited series, titled "Love & Hip Hop: The Final Chapter" will air in October 2026.

== Franchise history ==
=== Beginnings (2006–11) ===
In 2006, rapper Jim Jones approached VH1 executives to make a reality show about him. Jim Ackerman, senior vice president of development and production at the time, paired him with producers Stefan Springman and Toby Barraud of NFGTV, who produced the 11-minute presentation tape Keeping Up with the Joneses, which also featured Jones' longtime girlfriend Chrissy Lampkin and his mother Nancy. VH1 were unsure if audiences would be invested in the concept full-time and Jones' manager, Yandy Smith, approached Mona Scott-Young, her former employer at Violator, to retool the show. The concept was tweaked to include Jim's girlfriend Chrissy Lampkin and her circle of friends, influenced by the female ensemble-driven reality shows of the time.

The series was first announced in VH1's programming development report in April 2010, under the title Diary of a Hip Hop Girlfriend.

On January 4, 2011, VH1 announced that Love & Hip Hop would debut on March 6, 2011. The show would begin as an eight-episode series and star Chrissy, Jim Jones and his mother Nancy, along with Olivia Longott and her manager Rich Dollaz, Swizz Beatz's ex-wife Mashonda Tifrere and stylist Emily Bustamante, the mother of Fabolous's son. The first season was later expanded to nine episodes in order to include the first season reunion, which aired on May 16, 2011. Jon Caramanica of The New York Times praised the show's deconstruction of the public image of rappers, as well as the quality of the production values with "slick, beautiful shots of the women driving spectacular cars with no men in sight". However, he was critical of the "needless filler drama", a criticism that was shared by other critics who felt the "endless catty arguments and trashy behavior" detracted from the show's message and was too derivative of The Real Housewives franchise.

=== Breakthrough (2011–14) ===
On May 25, 2011, Love & Hip Hop was renewed for a second season, which premiered on November 14, 2011. The season saw the addition of Kimbella Vanderhee, the girlfriend of Juelz Santana, and Yandy Smith, Jim Jones' manager, to the cast, with Teairra Marí and video vixen Erica Mena in supporting roles. The season garnered big ratings for the network, averaging 2.8 million total viewers per episode, making it VH1's highest rated series in over three and a half years.

On February 6, 2012, during the finale of Love & Hip Hop's second season, series creator Mona Scott-Young officially announced that an Atlanta-based spin-off of Love & Hip Hop, then titled Love & Hip Hop: Hotlanta, was in production. On May 15, 2012, VH1 announced Love & Hip Hop: Atlanta would make its series premiere on June 18, 2012. The show premiered to a storm of controversy, with some viewers calling for a boycott for its seemingly negative and stereotypical portrayal of black women. Audience responses to media portrayals of Black women have included petitions and boycott campaigns criticizing dramaticized storylines and the commodification of Black women's experiences. One petition described the show as "another beautifully-blinged jewel of commercial exploitation" for its focus on dysfunctional relationships, materialism, hyper-sexuality and violence. These portrayals shape audience expectations by framing Black women as emotionally volatile and aggressive. Such portrayals shape public perception and carry social consequences for Black women by normalizing stereotypical representations in media. The love triangle between former Bad Boy Records producer Stevie J, his baby mama Mimi Faust and Joseline Hernandez, an ex-stripper-turned-aspiring artist who has an abortion in an early episode, garnered significant media attention, as did singer and breakout star K. Michelle's domestic violence storyline and Lil Scrappy's mother Momma Dee, who admits to being a former pimp. Hip-hop media often emphasizes men's perspectives while restricting women to roles associated with desirability, drama, or emotional labor. After the show's premiere, its audience grew substantially over the season, garnering even higher ratings than its predecessor. Its finale garnered 5.5 million people overall.

On September 7, 2012, VH1 announced that Chrissy Lampkin and Jim Jones would leave Love & Hip Hop, to star in their own spin-off show Chrissy & Mr. Jones, which premiered September 24, 2012. On December 16, 2012, VH1 aired Dirty Little Secrets, a special featuring unseen footage, deleted scenes and interviews with the show's cast and producers. The special garnered 1.22 million viewers.

The third season of Love & Hip Hop, now titled Love & Hip Hop: New York in promotional material, premiered on January 7, 2013. The show featured nearly a whole new cast, including Joe Budden, Consequence and their significant others. The season had a mixed reception from audiences, garnering the lowest ratings in the franchise's history at that point.

On April 1, 2013, VH1 announced that Love & Hip Hop: Atlanta's second season would premiere on April 22, 2013. The show's ratings continued to grow, with an average of 3.27 million viewers per episode. During the season's reunion special, K. Michelle announced that she was leaving the show to join the New York cast.

On October 10, 2013, VH1 announced New York's fourth season would premiere on October 28, 2013. The season would premiere back to back with the second and final season of Chrissy & Mr. Jones. The fourth season was preceded on October 24, 2013, by 40 Greatest Love & Hip Hop Moments, a 2-hour clip show special hosted by Mona Scott-Young, and showcased the franchise's most "shocking, scandalous and dramatic Love & Hip Hop moments", featuring clips from the show's first three seasons, as well as the first two seasons of Love & Hip Hop: Atlanta.

Season four's leading storyline involved a dysfunctional love triangle (reminiscent of storylines from Atlanta) between rapper Peter Gunz, his baby mama Tara Wallace and his wife, singer Amina Buddafly. The show's ratings improved significantly, up 54% over the previous season's average and attracting an average of 3 million total viewers per episode.

=== Peak (2014–17) ===
On April 14, 2014, VH1 announced that Love & Hip Hop: Atlanta's third season would premiere on May 5, 2014. The Love & Hip Hop franchise would be broadcast year-round continuously from this point, with an incarnation airing nearly every Monday on VH1. Atlanta's third season was a huge ratings success, with the season premiere having a combined rating of 5.6 million viewers and continuing to set ratings records throughout the season. The season's storylines and scandals (particularly Mimi and Nikko's sex tape, Benzino's non-fatal shooting and Joseline and Stevie's violent behavior at the reunion special) garnered intense media coverage and made its cast members tabloid fixtures.

On August 18, 2014, VH1 announced Love & Hip Hop: Hollywood, a new Los Angeles-based spin-off, would make its premiere on September 15, 2014. The show was notable for its high-profile cast, with the youngest and most established group of cast members in the franchise thus far, including Ray J, B2K's Omarion and Lil' Fizz, Soulja Boy and their significant others. On October 15, 2014, VH1 announced that K. Michelle would leave Love & Hip Hop: New York to star in her own spin-off show K. Michelle: My Life. The show would premiere on November 3, 2014, after Love & Hip Hop: Hollywood's eighth episode and run for six weeks. On December 2, 2014, VH1 announced that Love & Hip Hop: New York's fifth season would premiere on December 15, 2014.

On April 9, 2015, It was announced that the premiere of Love & Hip Hop: Atlanta's fourth season would air on April 20, 2015, and be followed by Love & Hip Hop Atlanta: The Afterparty Live!; a half-hour-long interactive after-show hosted by Big Tigger. The premiere block garnered a combined rating of 6.2 million viewers, it was the Summer's #1 cable reality series among adults 18-49 and women 18-49, and the 2nd most talked-about television series on social media overall. Love & Hip Hop: The Wedding, a two-hour special featuring the marriage between Love & Hip Hop: New York cast members Yandy Smith and Mendeecees Harris, aired live on May 25, 2015; in between the fifth and sixth episodes of season four. The special aired to over 2 million viewers, and featured appearances from Atlanta and Hollywood cast mates. Reality stars from other shows would also make appearances, including VH1's Black Ink Crew and Mob Wives, as well as from Bravo's The Real Housewives of Atlanta.

On August 10, 2015, it was announced that Love & Hip Hop: Hollywood's second season would premiere on September 7, 2015. The season premiere garnered a combined rating of 3.6 million viewers. The season featured the franchise's first openly gay couple Milan Christopher and Miles Brock, and featured public service announcements aimed to help viewers struggling with their sexual identity. On October 12, 2015, VH1 announced that Love & Hip Hop: Out in Hip Hop, a round-table discussion moderated by T. J. Holmes of ABC News, would air on October 19, 2015. The special focused on the reality on being openly LGBT in the hip hop community, and coincided with the airing of the seventh episode of the season, in which bisexual cast member Miles comes out to his ex-girlfriend Amber. It garnered 1.5 million viewers, ranking No. 1 among women 18–49 in its time period.

On July 7, 2015, shortly after her release from prison, Remy Ma announced that she was joining Love & Hip Hop: New York, along with her husband Papoose. On November 2, 2015, it was announced that season six of New York would premiere on December 14, 2015. The sixth season of New York would feature an entirely new opening credits sequence and visual aesthetic; subsequent seasons of Atlanta and Hollywood would follow suit. The cast would undergo a major cast change for the third time in the show's history, with its storylines focusing more on the struggles of female rappers in the industry than ever before. The season was also notable for the addition of social media personality and aspiring rapper Cardi B, who was dubbed the show's breakout star. On August 27, 2015, VH1 confirmed that Love & Hip Hop: Atlanta stars Stevie J and Joseline Hernandez would star in their own spin-off series, set in Los Angeles. On December 2, 2015, VH1 announced that Stevie J & Joseline: Go Hollywood would premiere on January 25, 2016, back to back with the second season of K. Michelle: My Life, after Love & Hip Hop: New York's seventh episode of the season.

Love & Hip Hop: Atlanta returned for a fifth season on April 4, 2016. On August 8, 2016, VH1 and 345 Games announced Love & Hip Hop: The Game, a mobile game for iOS and Android. It would be released worldwide on September 22, 2016. Love & Hip Hop: Hollywood would return for its third season on August 15, 2016.

On November 14, 2016, it was announced that Love & Hip Hop: New York's seventh season would premiere on November 21, 2016. On December 1, 2016, VH1 announced the spin-off Leave It to Stevie, featuring Stevie J's life as a bachelor after his break up with Joseline. The series premiered on December 19, 2016, back-to-back with the third and final season of K. Michelle: My Life, and after New York's seventh episode of the season. On December 30, 2016, Cardi B announced that she was leaving Love & Hip Hop: New York to focus on her rap career.

On February 21, 2017, VH1 announced Love & Hip Hop: Atlanta's sixth season would premiere on March 6, 2017. The season premiere garnered 5.2 million viewers, up 17% from its fifth season bow. On April 19, 2017, VH1 announced Joseline's Special Delivery, a special documenting the birth of Joseline's child with Stevie J. The special aired between the season's eighth and ninth episodes on May 1, 2017, and garnered 2.18 million viewers. With season six, Atlanta became the first iteration of the franchise to reach 100 episodes, however, production became increasingly troubled. Later episodes would show Joseline Hernandez breaking the fourth wall to express her displeasure with the producers. Behind the scenes during the reunion taping on June 1, 2017, a falling-out between Joseline, Mona Scott-Young and the other producers resulted in Joseline announcing that she would quit the show after six seasons. These incidents would be seen as a turning point for the franchise, as its ratings would begin to decline from 2018 onward.

On April 13, 2017, it was announced that Keyshia Cole would be joining the cast of Love & Hip Hop: Hollywood's fourth season, which would premiere on July 24, 2017. Prior to this, VH1 aired Dirty Little Secrets; a special featuring unseen footage and deleted scenes from the show's first three seasons, along with interviews with the show's cast and producers. A follow up, Dirty Little Secrets 2, aired on May 10, 2017; featuring Love & Hip Hop: Atlanta and Black Ink Crew.

=== Ratings decline (2017–19) ===
On October 2, 2017, it was announced that Love & Hip Hop: New York's eighth season would premiere on October 30, 2017. The season would feature an entirely new opening credits sequence and visual aesthetic; and as before, subsequent seasons of Atlanta and Hollywood would follow suit. VH1 aired another Dirty Little Secrets special two weeks before the season eight premiere, featuring scenes from New York's previous seven seasons. On November 16, 2017, VH1 announced that Remy & Papoose: A Merry Mackie Holiday, a holiday special starring Remy Ma and Papoose, would air on December 18, 2017.

On the night of New York's season premiere, a new Miami-based spin-off called Love & Hip Hop: Miami was announced. The series would premiere on January 1, 2018, after New York's tenth episode of the season. The series is notable for its diverse cast, reflecting Miami's racially and economically diverse community. The storyline involving Afro-Latina star Amara La Negra was praised by critics for "inviting cultural conversations" about misogynoir and the underrepresentation of Afro-Latinas in mainstream entertainment. On February 12, VH1 aired Love & Hip Hop: The Love Edition, a Valentine's Day special featuring clips from the franchise and interviews with its cast members.

On February 16, it was announced that Love & Hip Hop: Atlanta would premiere its seventh season on March 19, 2018. The season garnered the lowest ratings in the show's history, with its premiere episode down over a million viewers compared to last season. The second and final season of the spin-off Leave It to Stevie would premiere on March 26, 2018, after Atlanta's second episode of the season.

On June 18, 2018, it was announced that the fifth season of Love & Hip Hop: Hollywood would premiere on July 23, 2018. Despite continuing the franchise's overall ratings decline, the season's "over-the-top" storylines were well received by fans and critics, with Mic writer Michael Arceneaux praising the season for providing a "ratchet good time" and "making Love & Hip Hop great again". On September 24, 2018, VH1 aired Ray J & Princess' Labor of Love, a special featuring Ray J and Princess Love, as they prepare for the birth of their daughter. On September 17, 2018, VH1 announced that Remy Ma and Papoose would star in their own spin-off, Remy & Papoose: Meet the Mackies. The show would air October 1, 2018, after Hollywood's eleventh episode of the season, and run for three weeks.

On September 27, 2018, it was announced that the ninth season of Love & Hip Hop: New York would premiere on November 26, 2018. The season would be accompanied by an official podcast, Love & Hip Hop: The Tea, hosted by Jesse Janedy, TK Trinidad and Lem Gonsalves. On November 19, 2018, VH1 announced the second season of Love & Hip Hop: Miami would premiere on January 2, 2019. The season aired on Wednesday nights at 8pm/7c for the first two episodes, before being moved to 10pm/9c, after Black Ink Crew: Chicago. The show would return to Monday nights at 9pm/8c on February 3, after Love & Hip Hop: New York.

On February 25, 2019, VH1 announced the eighth season of Love & Hip Hop: Atlanta would premiere on March 25, 2019. On April 1, 2019, VH1 aired Love & Hip Hop Awards: Most Certified, a special hosted by Tami Roman and D.C. Young Fly, featuring franchise cast members being awarded in various categories. On April 5, 2019, VH1 announced another clip show special, 40 Greatest Love & Hip Hop Moments: The Reboot, would air April 8, 2019. The cast of the show would win the Best Reality Royalty Award at the 2019 MTV Movie & TV Awards.

=== Production changes (2019–20) ===
On October 23, 2018, Deadline reported that production company Eastern TV had been "taken off" Love & Hip Hop: Hollywood, though they would continue to produce New York, Miami and Atlanta. VH1 would be inviting "new producers to come and pitch" as they look to take the show in a "new direction". On July 8, 2019, it was announced that the show's sixth season would premiere on August 5, 2019, with Big Fish Entertainment taking over production. The season's visual changes drew mixed to negative reactions, and unfavorable comparisons Big Fish's other VH1 production, Black Ink Crew. Former main cast member Hazel-E posted a tweet saying "It went from #Hollywood to the hood". The season premiere was the lowest-rated in the show's history, dipping under 2 million viewers for the first time. Season six of Hollywood would ultimately be the first of the franchise to be produced without Eastern TV, as Big Fish would take over production of Love & Hip Hop going forward.

On September 12, 2019, it was reported that several former cast members would return to Love & Hip Hop: New York for its tenth anniversary. On November 4, 2019, it was confirmed that the show's tenth season would premiere on December 16, 2019. Original cast members Chrissy Lampkin, Jim Jones, Olivia Longott and Somaya Reece would rejoin the show, along with Erica Mena and Tahiry Jose. The tenth season was seen as Love & Hip Hop "returning to its roots". It would feature an entirely new opening credits sequence, highlighting a return to the franchise's "cinematic" aesthetics, while also reviving storylines from New York's earliest seasons. These changes were well received by fans and critics, with Arceneaux describing the season's double episode premiere as "magnifique".

On December 11, 2019, it was announced that the third season of Love & Hip Hop: Miami would premiere on January 6, 2020. The season would see Joseline Hernandez returning to the franchise after three years, being credited as a main cast member for the entire season, and heavily featured in its promotional material. The premiere garnered 1.41 million viewers, up from its previous season's rating of 1.09 million viewers, showing an improvement in the franchise's ratings since season six of Atlanta. After a series of interviews in which she criticized producer Mona Scott-Young, dismissing her as a "talent scout", Joseline disappeared from the show entirely after four episodes. In her absence, ratings for the season began to decline.

On February 18, 2020, VH1 announced Love & Hip Hop: Atlanta would return for its ninth season on March 16, 2020. After New York's mid-season finale aired on March 9, 2020, VH1 announced that the show would return in spring. On an episode of his podcast, released on March 26, 2020, Joe Budden confirmed the show was still filming, despite the growing COVID-19 pandemic. Production was affected by the pandemic, with cast members filming their green screen confessional scenes while quarantined at home. Atlanta's mid-season finale would air on May 11, 2020, and feature footage of production of the show being shut down because of the virus.

Filming of Love & Hip Hop was put on hold from May 6, 2020. The remaining episodes of New York and Atlanta's current seasons, and season four of Miami would be postponed until further notice. Production on Love & Hip Hop: Hollywood would not resume after the pandemic ended. On June 12, 2020, VH1-owners ViacomCBS announced that they had severed their relationship with Big Fish Entertainment, due to backlash against the handling of the video footage showing the killing of Javier Ambler for their A&E series, Live PD. In the wake of the murder of George Floyd, and the subsequent protests against police brutality, various reality shows involving police would be cancelled.

=== Reimagining (2021–present) ===
On October 8, 2020, Mona Scott-Young confirmed VH1 would be producing the Love & Hip Hop franchise in-house going forward, saying "it won't change my role in the way that I work with them but there is a process now that's taking place, and also of course, the caution, the precautions that need to be taken with figuring out how to reimagine a docuseries and do it while adhering to safety protocols and finding a different way of making the show.” On December 3, 2020, it was reported that two new spin-offs were in production and set to premiere in 2021, one features various couples from the franchise's history, and another featuring cast members from Love & Hip Hop: Atlanta, Hollywood and Miami living together in an Arizona hotel. On December 10, VH1 would announce a four-part Love & Hip Hop: Secrets Unlocked special to premiere on January 4, 2021. The reunion special, hosted by Kendall Kyndall, would feature cast members from New York, Atlanta, Hollywood and Miami.

On January 12, 2021, VH1 announced Love & Hip Hop: It's a Love Thing, a special featuring various Love & Hip Hop couples, would air on February 1, 2021. The special would be followed by VH1 Family Reunion: Love & Hip Hop Edition, a limited series featuring cast members from New York, Atlanta, Hollywood and Miami, on February 8. VH1 Couples Retreat, another six-part show, would premiere on March 29. Couples featured on the show included Love & Hip Hop: New York's Yandy Smith and Mendeecees Harris, Atlanta's Rasheeda and Kirk Frost, and Hollywood's Ray J and Princess Love; along with Flavor of Love's Deelishis and Raymond Santana, and comedian Michael Blackson and Rada.

On June 7, 2021, VH1 announced that the tenth season of Love & Hip Hop: Atlanta would premiere on July 5, 2021, preceded by the Love & Hip Hop Atlanta: Inside the A special that would air on June 28. In a departure from previous seasons, Atlanta would also feature cast members from Love & Hip Hop: New York, while its storylines focused more on social justice issues and the Black Lives Matter movement. The season premiere was the first in the show's history to garner under a million viewers, with ratings dropping with each episode.

On August 9, 2021, VH1 announced that the fourth season of Love & Hip Hop: Miami would premiere on August 23, 2021. As with Atlanta, the new season of Miami would be preceded by the Love & Hip Hop: Miami: Inside the 305 special on August 16.

On November 9, 2021, it was announced that VH1 Family Reunion would return for a second season on December 13, 2021. The season was followed by Love & Hip Hop: Lineage to Legacy, a special two-part crossover event with Black Ink Crew that explores the ancestry of various Love & Hip Hop cast members in the vein of Who Do You Think You Are. The special aired on February 7, 2022.

On July 11, 2022, VH1 announced that additional episodes of Love & Hip Hop: Atlanta's tenth season and Love & Hip Hop: Miami's fourth season would air from August 8, 2022. Another four-part special called Love & Hip Hop: Where Are They Now?, featuring past cast members from all four franchises, began airing from October 31, 2022. On November 8, 2022, it was announced that the third season of VH1 Family Reunion would premiere on November 28, 2022.

On April 11, 2023, it was reported that Love & Hip Hop: Atlanta would move to MTV for its eleventh season, which premiered on June 13, 2023. It was preceded by a special six-week limited series Love & Hip Hop Atlanta: Run It Back, which premiered May 9, 2023, and ended June 6, 2023, and featured cast members recapping every episode of the first season.

== Proposed spin-offs ==
Since 2013, Mona Scott-Young has discussed expanding the franchise to other cities, such as Chicago, New Orleans, Detroit and Houston.

On February 28, 2016, it was reported that potential spin-offs set in Miami and Houston were in pre-production and the producers were auditioning potential cast members. However, Scott-Young denied reports of a spin-off being filmed in New Orleans, saying "I would love to do a show there but there is no Love & Hip Hop: New Orleans being cast or shot right now." Love & Hip Hop: Houston was to feature Jhonni Blaze, Kirko Bangz, Kat St. John, Just Brittany, Nessacary, J. Prince Jr, Propain, the Sauce Twinz, the Charlo Brothers, DJ Eric, Lil' Keith, and Mehgan James as cast members. However, the show was put on hold indefinitely midway through filming in June 2016 due to concerns for the crew's safety, after several shoots were shut down by cast violence, as well as locals interrupting filming. On July 7, 2017, Scott-Young said "Houston I love. We wanted to do Houston and we went into Houston to cast and we may go back to Houston." In 2021, VH1 revealed that Megan Thee Stallion auditioned for Love & Hip Hop: Houston before her career took off.

On September 23, 2014, Tammy Rivera and Waka Flocka Flame announced on social media that they would be leaving Love & Hip Hop: Atlanta to star in their own spin-off show Meet the Flockas. However, the series never eventuated and Rivera returned to the main cast of Love & Hip Hop: Atlanta in 2016. On October 11, 2017, Waka confirmed that Meet the Flockas was in production and would be produced by Mona Scott-Young. Earlier on July 24, 2017, Safaree Samuels announced that he would be starring in his own spin-off Wild Safaree. Neither spin-offs ever made it to air, and Waka and Tammy would instead go on to star in We TV's Marriage Boot Camp: Hip Hop Edition, Waka & Tammy Tie The Knot and Growing Up Hip Hop: Atlanta. On February 25, 2019, Solo Lucci announced that he would be starring in his own dating show spin-off I Love Lucci. The show was to be hosted by Ray J and produced by Mona Scott Young, however it never made it to air and it is unclear if it was to be considered a part of the Love & Hip Hop franchise.

== Series overview ==
| Year | Series | Season | Premiere | Finale | Average viewers (millions) |
|---|---|---|---|---|---|
| 2011 | Love & Hip Hop: New York | 1 | March 6, 2011 | May 16, 2011 | 0.99 |
| 2011 | Love & Hip Hop: New York | 2 | November 14, 2011 | February 6, 2012 | 2.75 |
| 2012 | Love & Hip Hop: Atlanta | 1 | June 18, 2012 | September 3, 2012 | 3.25 |
| 2013 | Love & Hip Hop: New York | 3 | January 7, 2013 | April 15, 2013 | 1.93 |
| 2013 | Love & Hip Hop: Atlanta | 2 | April 22, 2013 | August 12, 2013 | 3.27 |
| 2013 | Love & Hip Hop: New York | 4 | October 28, 2013 | February 10, 2014 | 3.06 |
| 2014 | Love & Hip Hop: Atlanta | 3 | May 5, 2014 | September 8, 2014 | 3.54 |
| 2014 | Love & Hip Hop: Hollywood | 1 | September 15, 2014 | December 9, 2014 | 2.42 |
| 2014 | Love & Hip Hop: New York | 5 | December 15, 2014 | April 13, 2015 | 2.45 |
| 2015 | Love & Hip Hop: Atlanta | 4 | April 20, 2015 | August 31, 2015 | 2.91 |
| 2015 | Love & Hip Hop: Hollywood | 2 | September 7, 2015 | December 7, 2015 | 2.47 |
| 2015 | Love & Hip Hop: New York | 6 | December 14, 2015 | March 28, 2016 | 2.56 |
| 2016 | Love & Hip Hop: Atlanta | 5 | April 4, 2016 | August 8, 2016 | 2.59 |
| 2016 | Love & Hip Hop: Hollywood | 3 | August 15, 2016 | November 14, 2016 | 2.20 |
| 2016 | Love & Hip Hop: New York | 7 | November 21, 2016 | February 27, 2017 | 2.40 |
| 2017 | Love & Hip Hop: Atlanta | 6 | March 6, 2017 | July 17, 2017 | 2.74 |
| 2017 | Love & Hip Hop: Hollywood | 4 | July 24, 2017 | October 23, 2017 | 2.02 |
| 2017 | Love & Hip Hop: New York | 8 | October 30, 2017 | March 12, 2018 | 1.81 |
| 2018 | Love & Hip Hop: Miami | 1 | January 1, 2018 | March 19, 2018 | 1.72 |
| 2018 | Love & Hip Hop: Atlanta | 7 | March 19, 2018 | July 16, 2018 | 2.05 |
| 2018 | Love & Hip Hop: Hollywood | 5 | July 23, 2018 | November 19, 2018 | 1.90 |
| 2018 | Love & Hip Hop: New York | 9 | November 26, 2018 | March 18, 2019 | 1.41 |
| 2019 | Love & Hip Hop: Miami | 2 | January 2, 2019 | March 25, 2019 | 1.05 |
| 2019 | Love & Hip Hop: Atlanta | 8 | March 25, 2019 | July 29, 2019 | 1.62 |
| 2019 | Love & Hip Hop: Hollywood | 6 | August 5, 2019 | December 23, 2019 | 1.31 |
| 2019 | Love & Hip Hop: New York | 10 | December 16, 2019 | March 9, 2020 | 1.24 |
| 2020 | Love & Hip Hop: Miami | 3 | January 6, 2020 | April 6, 2020 | 1.13 |
| 2020 | Love & Hip Hop: Atlanta | 9 | March 16, 2020 | May 11, 2020 | 1.37 |
| 2021 | Love & Hip Hop: Atlanta | 10 | July 5, 2021 | November 21, 2022 | 0.67 |
| 2021 | Love & Hip Hop: Miami | 4 | August 23, 2021 | October 17, 2022 | 0.49 |
| 2023 | Love & Hip Hop: Atlanta | 11 | June 13, 2023 | April 23, 2024 | |
| 2023 | Love & Hip Hop: Miami | 5 | August 14, 2023 | April 15, 2024 | |
| 2024 | Love & Hip Hop: Atlanta | 12 | July 23, 2024 | April 29, 2025 | |
| 2024 | Love & Hip Hop: Miami | 6 | November 18, 2024 | April 28, 2025 | |
| 2025 | Love & Hip Hop: Atlanta | 13 | July 8, 2025 | May 19, 2026 | |
| 2025 | Love & Hip Hop: Miami | 7 | November 4, 2025 | June 24, 2026 | |

== Spin-offs ==
| Year | Series | Season | Premiere | Finale | Average viewers (millions) |
|---|---|---|---|---|---|
| 2012 | Chrissy & Mr. Jones | 1 | September 24, 2012 | November 12, 2012 | 1.69 |
| 2013 | Chrissy & Mr. Jones | 2 | October 28, 2013 | December 16, 2013 | 2.54 |
| 2014 | K. Michelle: My Life | 1 | November 3, 2014 | December 8, 2014 | 1.90 |
| 2016 | Stevie J & Joseline: Go Hollywood | 1 | January 25, 2016 | March 21, 2016 | 1.92 |
| 2016 | K. Michelle: My Life | 2 | January 25, 2016 | March 28, 2016 | 1.72 |
| 2016 | Leave It to Stevie | 1 | December 19, 2016 | February 6, 2017 | 1.80 |
| 2016 | K. Michelle: My Life | 3 | December 19, 2016 | February 6, 2017 | 1.54 |
| 2018 | Leave It to Stevie | 2 | March 26, 2018 | April 30, 2018 | 1.23 |
| 2018 | Remy & Papoose: Meet the Mackies | 1 | October 1, 2018 | October 15, 2018 | 0.97 |
| 2021 | Family Reunion: Love & Hip Hop Edition | 1 | February 8, 2021 | March 22, 2021 | 0.47 |
| 2021 | Family Reunion: Love & Hip Hop Edition | 2 | December 13, 2021 | February 14, 2022 | 0.53 |
| 2022 | Family Reunion: Love & Hip Hop Edition | 3 | November 28, 2022 | February 6, 2023 | 0.42 |

== Specials ==
| Year | Special | Series | Season | Premiere | Episode(s) | Average viewers (millions) |
|---|---|---|---|---|---|---|
| 2012 | Love & Hip Hop Atlanta: Dirty Little Secrets | Love & Hip Hop: Atlanta | 1 | December 16, 2012 | 1 | 1.22 |
| 2013 | 40 Greatest Love & Hip Hop Moments | Love & Hip Hop: New York | 4 | October 24, 2013 | 2 | —N/a |
| 2015 | Love & Hip Hop Live: The Wedding | Love & Hip Hop: New York | 5 | May 25, 2015 | 1 | 2.04 |
| 2015 | Love & Hip Hop: Out in Hip Hop | Love & Hip Hop: Hollywood | 2 | October 19, 2015 | 1 | 1.50 |
| 2017 | Love & Hip Hop Atlanta: Joseline's Special Delivery | Love & Hip Hop: Atlanta | 6 | May 1, 2017 | 1 | 2.18 |
| 2017 | Love & Hip Hop Atlanta: Dirty Little Secrets 2 | Love & Hip Hop: Atlanta | 6 | May 10, 2017 | 1 | 1.05 |
| 2017 | Love & Hip Hop Hollywood: Dirty Little Secrets | Love & Hip Hop: Hollywood | 4 | July 3, 2017 | 1 | 1.51 |
| 2017 | Love & Hip Hop New York: Dirty Little Secrets | Love & Hip Hop: New York | 8 | October 18, 2017 | 1 | 0.70 |
| 2017 | Remy & Papoose: A Merry Mackie Holiday | Love & Hip Hop: New York | 8 | December 18, 2017 | 1 | 1.23 |
| 2018 | Love & Hip Hop: The Love Edition | Love & Hip Hop: New York | 8 | February 12, 2018 | 1 | 1.25 |
| 2018 | Love & Hip Hop Hollywood: Ray J & Princess' Labor of Love | Love & Hip Hop: Hollywood | 5 | September 24, 2018 | 1 | 1.31 |
| 2019 | Love & Hip Hop Awards: Most Certified | Love & Hip Hop: Atlanta | 8 | April 1, 2019 | 1 | 0.99 |
| 2019 | 40 Greatest Love & Hip Hop Moments: The Reboot | Love & Hip Hop: Atlanta | 8 | April 8, 2019 | 2 | 0.80 |
| 2021 | Love & Hip Hop: Secrets Unlocked | Family Reunion: Love & Hip Hop Edition | 1 | January 4, 2021 | 4 | 0.40 |
| 2021 | Love & Hip Hop: It's a Love Thing | Family Reunion: Love & Hip Hop Edition | 1 | February 1, 2021 | 1 | 0.31 |
| 2021 | Love & Hip Hop Atlanta: Inside the A | Love & Hip Hop: Atlanta | 10 | June 28, 2021 | 1 | 0.44 |
| 2021 | Love & Hip Hop Miami: Inside the 305 | Love & Hip Hop: Miami | 4 | August 16, 2021 | 1 | 0.53 |
| 2022 | Love & Hip Hop: Lineage to Legacy | Family Reunion: Love & Hip Hop Edition | 2 | February 7, 2022 | 2 | 0.31 |
| 2022 | Love & Hip Hop: Where Are They Now? | Love & Hip Hop: Atlanta | 10 | October 31, 2022 | 4 | 0.27 |
| 2023 | Love & Hip Hop Atlanta: Run It Back | Love & Hip Hop: Atlanta | 11 | May 2, 2023 | 12 | TBA |
| 2023 | Love & Hip Hop Miami: Top 10 Most Outrageous Moments | Love & Hip Hop: Miami | 5 | July 24, 2023 | 1 | 0.06 |
| 2023 | Love & Hip Hop Miami: Top 10 Most Legendary Moments | Love & Hip Hop: Miami | 5 | July 31, 2023 | 1 | TBA |
| 2023 | Love & Hip Hop Miami: The Rewind | Love & Hip Hop: Miami | 5 | August 7, 2023 | 1 | TBA |

== Awards and nominations ==
| Year | Award | Category | Nominated artist/work | Result |
|---|---|---|---|---|
| 2018 | MTV Movie & TV Awards | Best Reality Franchise | Love & Hip Hop | Nominated |
| 2019 | MTV Movie & TV Awards | Best Reality Royalty | Love & Hip Hop: Atlanta | Won |
| 2019 | MTV Movie & TV Awards | Best Meme-able Moment | Love & Hip Hop: Hollywood | Nominated |
| 2021 | MTV Movie & TV Awards | Best Docu-Reality Show | Love & Hip Hop: Atlanta | Nominated |
| 2021 | MTV Movie & TV Awards | Best Reality Cast | Love & Hip Hop: Atlanta | Nominated |
| 2021 | MTV Movie & TV Awards | Best New Unscripted Series | Family Reunion: Love & Hip Hop Edition | Nominated |
| 2022 | MTV Movie & TV Awards | Best Docu-Reality Show | Love & Hip Hop: Atlanta | Nominated |
| 2023 | MTV Movie & TV Awards | Best Docu-Reality Show | Family Reunion: Love & Hip Hop Edition | Nominated |

== International versions ==
| Place | Local title | Original channel | Premiere date | Season | Ref. |
|---|---|---|---|---|---|
| Africa | Love & Hip Hop: South Africa | MTV Africa | 2023 | 1 season | |
