= Love & Hip Hop: New York season 9 =

Love & Hip Hop: New York
- Season 9
- Cover used by the iTunes Store
- Starring: Remy Ma & Papoose; Joe Budden & Cyn Santana; Kimbella & Juelz Santana; Yandy Smith-Harris; Rich Dollaz; Juju C.; Safaree Samuels
- No. of episodes: 16

Release
- Original network: VH1
- Original release: November 26, 2018 – March 18, 2019

Season chronology
- ← Previous; Season 8 Next → Season 10

The ninth season of the reality television series Love & Hip Hop: New York aired on VH1 from November 26, 2018, until March 18, 2019. The season was primarily filmed in New York City, New York. It is executively produced by Mona Scott-Young, Stephanie Gayle and Treiva Williams for Monami Entertainment, Toby Barraud, Stefan Springman, David DiGangi, Dave Patry, Richard Allen, Meredith Kisgen and Michael Carrozza for Eastern TV, and Nina L. Diaz, Liz Fine and Vivian Gomez for VH1.

The series chronicles the lives of several women and men in the New York area, involved in hip hop music. It consists of 16 episodes, including a two-part reunion special hosted by Nina Parker.

== Production ==
Season nine of Love & Hip Hop: New York began filming in June 2018.

On September 27, 2018, VH1 announced the show's return for a ninth season, which will premiere on November 26, 2018. After a four-year hiatus, it was announced that Cyn Santana and Joe Budden would return to the show in season nine, along with Kimbella and Juelz Santana, with rapper Maino joining the cast. On November 5, 2018, VH1 released a teaser with the season's tagline "the comeback season begins", confirming that Rich Dollaz, after appearing as a supporting cast member in every season prior, had finally been promoted to main cast, along with Budden, Papoose, Juelz and Safaree. The three couples – Remy and Papoose, Joe and Cyn, Kimbella and Juelz – are credited together in the opening credits. Mariahlynn, Anaís and Nya Lee would return to the show as supporting cast members, along with Maino, his girlfriend Maggie Carrie, Love & Hip Hop: Hollywood's Alexis Skyy and transgender rapper Sidney Starr.

The season's promotional videos would all follow a nostalgic, old school aesthetic, with more of a focus on the show's couples and "O.G." cast members than ever before. On November 13, 2018, VH1 began releasing interviews with Yandy, Rich, Remy and Safaree, looking back on their time on the show. On November 19, 2018, VH1 released a five-minute supertrailer. On November 21, 2018, VH1 released a five-minute sneak peek from the season's premiere episode.

The season would be accompanied by an official podcast, Love & Hip Hop: The Tea, hosted by Jesse Janedy, TK Trinidad and Lem Gonsalves.

== Synopsis ==
I'm Joe Budden, I used to be a rapper... but now, I'm the single most relevant voice in music today. So who better to school y'all in the art of surviving the game? The game that is hip hop. Fans are fickle, and critics are haters, and rappers stay busy firing shots instead of spitting fire. When the odds are stacked against you, music may be your only lifeline to the outside world. If you want to survive in hip hop, you gotta be tough, especially when you're playing for a team. Sometimes surviving the game instead a game at all. The game isn't for everybody. If you're tired of playing, try doing what I did. Rebrand. Reinvent. Times have changed and so have I but it's ok. Cause I still don't fake, I still don't front and I still don't give a fuck... well maybe I do. Welcome to Love & Hip Hop.

— Joe Budden, opening monologue

== Cast ==
=== Starring ===
- Remy Ma (8 episodes)
- Papoose (8 episodes)
- Joe Budden (14 episodes)
- Cyn Santana (15 episodes)
- Kimbella Vanderhee (13 episodes)
- Juelz Santana (11 episodes)
- Yandy Smith-Harris (12 episodes)
- Rich Dollaz (11 episodes)
- Juju C. (10 episodes)
- Safaree Samuels (9 episodes)

=== Also starring ===
- Alexis Skyy (10 episodes)
- Maino (10 episodes)
- Jaquáe (9 episodes)
- Jonathan Fernandez (11 episodes)
- Anaís (4 episodes)
- Sidney Starr (9 episodes)
- Nya Lee (10 episodes)
- Maggie Carrie (9 episodes)
- Kiyanne (1 episode)
- Mariahlynn (7 episodes)
- DJ Self (1 episode)
- Judy Harris (1 episode)

Navarro Gray and Ashley Trowers return in guest roles. Yandy's foster daughter Infinity Gilyard, Juelz's mother Deborah James and Ashley's mother Miracle Kaye Hall appear as guest stars in several episodes. Mendeecees Harris appears via phone call conversations with Yandy, as he was incarcerated during filming. The show also features minor appearances from notable figures within the hip hop industry and New York's social scene, including Shotti, Fetty Wap, The Joe Budden Podcast's Rory & Mal, Anaís' husband Ruben Brito, Danny García, Joe's mother Fay Southerland, Couple Therapy's Dr. Jenn Mann, Rich's mother Jewel Escobar and Love & Hip Hop: Hollywood's Solo Lucci.

== Episodes ==
No. overall	No. in season	Title	Original release date	U.S. viewers (millions)
114	1	"Arrested Development"	November 26, 2018	1.85
Kimbella and Juelz struggle as he awaits trial. guest stars: Alycia (counselor), Navarro Gray (Alexis Skyy's lawyer), Shotti (Tr3yway CEO), Fetty Wap; Cyn and Kimbella return and Papoose, Joe, Juelz, Rich and Safaree are added to the opening credits, replacing departing cast members Bianca, Mariahlynn, Anaís, Lil' Mo and Snoop. Alexis Skyy and Maino join the supporting cast. Although credited, Remy, Papoose, Yandy and Juju do not appear.
115	2	"The Blame Game"	December 3, 2018	1.61
Jonathan reveals his issues with Juju. guest stars: Joan Csere (Alexis Skyy's grandma); Although credited, Remy, Papoose, Rich and Safaree do not appear.
116	3	"Pleas and Thank You"	December 10, 2018	1.60
Anais opens up about her career struggles. guest stars: Ruben Brito, Byron (Sidney's friend); Sidney Starr joins the supporting cast. Although credited, Joe appears only in archival footage from his Instagram and Safaree does not appear.
117	4	"Triggers"	December 17, 2018	1.48
Maggie tries to overcome her PTSD. guest stars: Julius (Maggie's brother), Danny Garcia (ex-welterweight champion); Maggie Carrie joins the supporting cast. Although credited, Remy, Papoose, Kimbella, Juelz and Rich do not appear.
118	5	"Gwinners & Losers"	December 24, 2018	0.90
Mariahlynn returns. guest stars: Gisselle (Cyn's sister), Leslie (Cyn's sister), Jasmine (Jonathan's sister) on phone: Mendeecees Harris Although credited, Remy, Papoose, Juelz and Rich do not appear.
119	6	"Own Your Truth"	January 7, 2019	1.33
Rich gets real with Sidney Starr. guest stars: Fay Southerland (Joe Budden's mother), Shotti (Tr3yway CEO); Although credited, Remy, Papoose, Yandy, Juju and Safaree do not appear. Anaís appears only in archival footage from her Instagram.
120	7	"Hard Choices"	January 14, 2019	1.45
Safaree cashes in on his nude photos scandal. guest stars: Moose (director), Infinity, Byron (Sidney's friend), Scott (Doc Johnson VP), Thao (Doc Johnson Exec.), Chad (Doc Johnson COO), Brittani (Safaree's manager), Monisha (Safaree's manager); Although credited, Kimbella, Juelz and Juju do not appear. Scottie Beam and Brandon "Jinx" Jenkins appear in archival footage from State of the Culture.
121	8	"Collateral Damage"	January 21, 2019	1.44
Cyn opens up about her childhood abuse with a counselor. Yandy meets with Infinity's mother, who provides a very different story about Infinity's childhood. Rich's baby mama Miracle faces legal issues after she shoots her husband. guest stars: Infinity, Dr. Jenn Mann (counselor), Jewel (Rich's mother), Lorraine (Infinity's mother), Ashley (Rich's daughter), Miracle (Ashley's mother); Although credited, Kimbella, Juelz, Juju and Safaree do not appear.
122	9	"Sour Grapes"	January 28, 2019	1.34
Jonathan takes the girls to a vineyard, where Nya clashes with Sidney and Mariahlynn. Rich accompanies Miracle to court. guest stars: Debbie (Juelz's mom), Miracle (Ashley's mother), Frank Graessle (owner), Joan, Ashley (Rich's daughter), Trina Williams (Miracle's lawyer); Although credited, Remy, Papoose, Joe, Yandy, Juju and Safaree do not appear.
123	10	"Crease the Timbs"	February 4, 2019	1.34
Sidney considers sex reassignment surgery. Maggie wants Maino to take her seriously as an artist. Juelz proposes to Kimbella. guest stars: Ashley (Rich's daughter), Dr. Jess Ting (plastic surgeon), Debbie (Juelz's mom); Although credited, Remy, Papoose, Joe, Cyn, Yandy, Juju and Safaree do not appear.
124	11	"Why You Trippin'?"	February 11, 2019	1.33
Remy and Papoose throw their baby shower as they prepare to welcome "the golden child". Alexis confronts Solo Lucci over his claims that he's the father of her child. Juju invites the girls to a trip to Costa Rica. guest stars: Ikey (Alexis' friend), Solo Lucci, Tre (Joe's son); Although credited, Rich does not appear.
125	12	"Pura Vida"	February 18, 2019	1.43
Juju reveals she has unresolved issues with Safaree. Rich tries to convince Ashley to go back to school. Yandy and Kimbella come face to face. guest stars: Miracle, Ashley (Rich's daughter), Solo Lucci; Although credited, Juelz does not appear.
126	13	"Zip It"	February 25, 2019	1.26
Yandy and Kimbella attempt to move forward. Safaree attempts to stay quiet about his relationship with Cyn's ex Erica Mena, provoking a heated confrontation with Joe. Although credited, Remy, Papoose and Rich do not appear.
127	14	"Locked Down"	March 4, 2019	1.28
Juelz and Kimbella get married. Joe proposes to Cyn. Rich confronts Safaree over his sudden engagement with Erica Mena. Remy and Papoose welcome a daughter. guest stars: Debbie (Juelz's mother), Fay (Joe Budden's mother), Sherry (Kimbella's mother), Jermaine "Twin" James (Juelz's brother), Ottelie (Kimbella's father), Ashley
128	15	"Reunion – Part 1"	March 11, 2019	1.36
Kimbella announces her pregnancy, and hashes out her issues with Yandy. Rich provokes an emotional revelation from Mariahlynn. Cyn opens up about being in therapy. host: Nina Parker guest stars: Stephanie Gayle (executive producer), Stefan Springman (executive producer)
129	16	"Reunion – Part 2"	March 18, 2019	1.63
Safaree arrives onstage and is confronted by Cyn, Joe and Rich. Nya and Mariahlynn come to blows. host: Nina Parker

== Webisodes ==
=== Check Yourself ===
Love & Hip Hop New York: Check Yourself, which features the cast's reactions to each episode, was released weekly with every episode on digital platforms.

List of Love & Hip Hop New York: Check Yourself Season 9 episodes

Episode	Title	Featured cast members	Ref
1	"Cyn Wants Sexy Time & Safaree Gets Corny"	Cyn, Jonathan, Safaree, Jaquáe	
2	"Jonathan's Birthday Drama"	Jonathan, Cyn, Yandy, Anaís	
3	"Jonathan's Messy Birthday & Sidney Starr's Diner Debut"	Jonathan, Cyn, Anaís, Nya Lee, Sidney Starr, Jaquáe	
4	"Juju and Jonathan's Dispute & Jaquae and Kiyanne's Reunion"	Jonathan, Cyn, Yandy, Nya Lee, Jaquáe, Safaree	
5	"Nya and Self's Spat & Yandy and Kimbella's Olive Branch"	Nya Lee, Jaquáe, Mariahlynn, Safaree, Cyn, Jonathan, Yandy	
6	"Sidney Starr Hits the Studio & Joe Budden Gets a Sex Talk"	Jaquáe, Rich, Nya Lee, Sidney Starr, Cyn, Jonathan	
7	"Street Meat Deals & Nya Lee Gives Unwanted Style Tips"	Safaree, Mariahlynn, Yandy, Nya Lee, Cyn, Jaquáe, Sidney Starr	
8	"Judy's Two Cents & Double Date Night"	Yandy, Jonathan, Mariahlynn, Nya Lee, Cyn, Jaquáe, Rich	
9	"Kimbella's Seduction & Nya Lee's Fight with Mariahlynn"	Maino, Maggie, Cyn, Jonathan, Nya Lee, Mariahlynn, Sidney Starr	
10	"Maino Confronts Maggie & Sidney Starr Visits a Surgeon"	Maino, Yandy, Maggie, Alexis Skyy, Jonathan, Cyn, Sidney Starr	
11	"Wedding Bells are Ringing & Yandy Gets Hoodwinked"	Maggie, Yandy, Cyn, Maino, Sidney Starr	
12	"Breakfast Tea Gets Spilled & Kimbella and Yandy Have It Out"	Cyn, Juju, Maggie, Kimbella, Maino, Jonathan, Yandy	
13	"Bonding in Costa Rica"	Kimbella, Maino, Rich, Safaree	
14	"Bonfire of the Profanities & Joe's Proposal"	Safaree, Rich, Maggie, Yandy, Maino, Juju, Cyn, Jonathan, Kimbella	

=== Bonus scenes ===
Deleted scenes from the season's episodes were released weekly as bonus content on VH1's official website.

List of Love & Hip Hop: New York Season 10 bonus scenes

Episode	Title	Featured cast members	Ref
1	"Why Was Safaree on Dyckman in the First Place?"	Joe, Rory & Mal	
2	"Jonathan and Anaís Take Issue with Juju"	Jonathan, Anaís	
3	"Yandy Talks Parenting and Prison with Juelz"	Yandy, Juelz	
4	"Kiyanne Is Ready to Move On from Jaquáe"	Safaree, Kiyanne	
5	"Mariahlynn Refuses to Back Down to Nicki Minaj"	Mariahlynn, DJ Self, Safaree	
6	"Cyn and Jonathan Get Real with Each Other"	Cyn, Jonathan	
7	"Is the Money Even Worth It?"	Safaree, Shirley Samuels	
8	"Sidney Starr Gets Motherly Advice"	Sidney Starr	
9	"Kimbella Talks Marriage Plans" (Extended scene)	Kimbella, Cyn	
10	"Mariahlynn and Jonathan Make a Pinkie Promise"	Mariahlynn, Jonathan	
11	"Safaree Joins the Girls' Trip"	Safaree, Yandy	
12	"Papoose Plays Doctor to Remy"	Papoose, Remy	
13	"Everything Is Temporary"	Kimbella, Maino	
14	"Kimbella Asks Yandy to Be Her Bridesmaid"	Kimbella, Yandy	
