= Love & Hip Hop: New York season 3 =

Love & Hip Hop: New York
- Season 3
- DVD cover
- Starring: Yandy Smith; Erica Mena; Jen the Pen; Raqi Thunda; Winter Ramos; Rashidah Ali; Tahiry Jose
- No. of episodes: 14

Release
- Original network: VH1
- Original release: January 7 – April 15, 2013

Season chronology
- ← Previous; Season 2 Next → Season 4

The third season of the reality television series Love & Hip Hop: New York aired on VH1 from January 7, 2013 until April 15, 2013. The season was primarily filmed in New York City, New York. It was executively produced by Mona Scott-Young for Monami Entertainment, Toby Barraud and Stefan Springman for NFGTV, and Shelly Tatro, Brad Abramson, Danielle Gelfand and Jeff Olde for VH1.

The series chronicles the lives of several women and men in the New York area, involved in hip hop music. It consists of 14 episodes, including a two-part reunion special hosted by Mona Scott-Young.

== Production ==
The show underwent major cast changes after last season's reunion special, in which all four original cast members accused their producers of manipulating storylines for drama. On September 7, 2012, VH1 announced that Chrissy Lampkin and Jim Jones would leave the show to star in their own spin-off show Chrissy & Mr. Jones, along with Emily Bustamante and Jim's mother Nancy Jones. Somaya Reece quit the show all together, while Olivia Longott's role would be diminished significantly, appearing only as a supporting cast member.

On December 4, 2012, VH1 announced that Love & Hip Hop would be returning for a third season on January 7, 2013. Rich Dollaz and Yandy Smith were the only major cast members from the first two seasons to remain on the show, with Yandy taking over for Chrissy as the lead. Erica Mena was promoted to the main cast, along with author and former hip hop groupie Winter Ramos, who had a brief guest appearance last season. They were joined by video vixen Tahiry Jose, radio personalities Raqi Thunda and Jen the Pen and celebrity stiletto expert Rashidah Ali. Joe Budden, Yandy's boyfriend Mendeecees Harris, Consequence and aspiring rapper Lore'l appeared as supporting cast members, with Joe's girlfriend Kaylin Garcia appearing in a minor supporting role. Former main cast member Kimbella Vanderhee returned as a guest star for two episodes.

The season was released on DVD in region 1 on June 19, 2013.

== Synopsis ==
New York, where it all began. To make it in this city, you always have to remember where you came from, to get to where you're going. You always have the family you're born with. What counts is the family you build. Sex is always the lure but be careful not to get trapped. Someone's always trying to make it to the top. Its staying there that means you've made it. Its always easy to say "I love you" but it means nothing without respect. So welcome back to New York. The players change but the game always stays the same. Cause it ain't all fair, in love and hip hop.

— Mona Scott-Young, opening monologue

Yandy has given birth to a baby boy with her boyfriend Mendeecees, and thinks it's about time he put a ring on it. Rapper Joe Budden struggles with substance abuse and feelings for his ex Tahiry. Erica mixes business with pleasure with her manager Rich as she embarks on a music career. Rapper Consequence and his long time girlfriend Jen the Pen clash over his Muslim faith and how to raise their son.

=== Reception ===
The cast retooling had a mixed reception from audiences with the season garnering the lowest ratings in the franchise's history at that point.

== Cast ==
=== Starring ===
- Yandy Smith (13 episodes)
- Erica Mena (13 episodes)
- Jen the Pen (13 episodes)
- Raqi Thunda (13 episodes)
- Winter Ramos (7 episodes)
- Rashidah Ali (10 episodes)
- Tahiry Jose (14 episodes)

=== Also starring ===
- Joe Budden (13 episodes)
- Rich Dollaz (14 episodes)
- Mendeecees Harris (11 episodes)
- Olivia Longott (9 episodes)
- Consequence (13 episodes)
- Lore'l (10 episodes)
- Kaylin Garcia (9 episodes)

Kimbella Vanderhee returns in a guest role for two episodes. Joe's mother Fay Southerland, Cisco Rosado, Peter Gunz, Yandy's mother Laura Smith, Rich's mother Jewel Escobar and his ex-girlfriend Tiffany Lewis appear in several episodes as guest stars. The show also features minor appearances from notable figures within the hip hop industry and the cast's inner circle, including Ebro Darden, Vado, Yandy's cousin Maurice Talton and Angela Yee.

== Episodes ==
No. overall	No. in season	Title	Original release date	US viewers (millions)
21	1	"The Whole Truth and Nothing But The Truth..."	January 7, 2013	2.59
Exes Tahiry and Joe have some unfinished business and are trying to redefine their friendship while dealing with interference from Joe's "best friend" and trouble maker Raqi. cameo: Kaylin; Erica, Jen, Raqi, Winter, Rashidah and Tahiry are added to the opening credits, replacing departing cast members Chrissy, Emily, Somaya, Kimbella and Olivia, who returns as a supporting cast member. Mendeecees and Joe Budden join the supporting cast. Jen, Consequence and Lore'l appear only in the opening monologue sequence.
22	2	"Raq and a Hard Place"	January 14, 2013	2.20
Joe puts Raqi in her place for stepping over the line and ends their friendship, but now he is dealing with a much greater personal problem. Jen and Cons celebrate their sons' first birthday, but argue over religious differences. guest stars: Fay (Joe's mother), Kaylin (Joe's girlfriend), Cisco (CEO, CMG/MOG); Consequence and Lore'l join the supporting cast. Although credited, Yandy does not appear.
23	3	"Family Matters"	January 21, 2013	1.93
Consequence and Jen deal with the conflicting role religion plays in their relationship. Mendeecees and Yandy wonder if they are both ready to take the next step in their relationship. guest stars: Fay; Although credited, Winter does not appear.
24	4	"Life Support"	January 28, 2013	2.19
Erica and Olivia meet to settle the score. Tahiry surprises Joe with a gift. Yandy and Mendeecees face a most difficult time as parents. guest stars: Dr. Alan Hirschmann (pediatrician), Charles Aziz Bilal (head imam); Although credited, Winter does not appear.
25	5	"Can't Take the Heat"	February 4, 2013	1.92
Tahiry and Joe continue on their path of trying to work on friendship. Yandy gets out of the doghouse with Mendeecees by making a sexy video for his birthday. Rich reluctantly agrees to Erica doing a ballad as her first single. guest stars: Ebro (Hot 97 program director), Laura (Yandy's mother), Kimbella, Vado (rapper); Although credited, Winter does not appear.
26	6	"Ain't Always About the Dollaz"	February 18, 2013	1.88
Rich gives Erica an ultimatum in her career. Kaylin takes a stand regarding Joe and Tahiry's relationship, but when Tahiry sees Kaylin, it gets ugly. Cons sticks up for Jen by defending his girl. guest stars: Maurice (Yandy's cousin), Keenan (Sr. Mgr, Ent. Marketing), Angela Yee (radio personality); Kaylin joins the supporting cast. Although credited, Rashidah does not appear.
27	7	"Burn After Reading"	February 25, 2013	1.81
Mendeecees and Maurice bury the hatchet. Rich considers the advice of people closest to him regarding his relationship with Erica. Cons and Jen interview potential babysitters for Caiden. guest stars: Peter Gunz (Rich's business partner), Vado (rapper), Jewel (Rich's mother), Maurice (Yandy's cousin); Although credited, Raqi and Rashidah do not appear.
28	8	"Closing the Book"	March 4, 2013	1.81
Rich takes action and confronts Erica on her wrongdoings but she remains steadfast in proving her worth. Joe has a revelation about how he has treated Tahiry and commits to changing. Rashidah launches her new shoe line, but still can't escape negativity. guest stars: Peter Gunz (Rich's business partner), Lauren (Jen's best friend)
29	9	"Redemption Song"	March 11, 2013	1.62
Lore'l and Cons attempt to do a record together. Raqi and Rashidah prove their disdain for one another. Joe finally steps up to the plate and supports Tahiry in her career, but she has difficulty trusting his intentions. Rich pulls the rug out from underneath Erica. guest stars: Jewel (Rich's mother), Cisco (CEO of CMG) Although credited, Winter does not appear.
30	10	"Do the Right Thing"	March 18, 2013	1.51
Erica fights to get her man back the best way she knows how, but a secret is revealed to Olivia that may spice things up. Tahiry gears up for a meaningful trip and is pleasantly surprised by Joe's support. guest stars: Lizy (Tahiry's mother), Vado (rapper), Jewel (Rich's mother), Ebro (Hot 97 program director), Laura (Yandy's mother), Tiffany (Rich's ex-girlfriend), Jilton Greene (realtor) Although credited, Jen, Winter and Rashidah do not appear.
31	11	"With or Without You?"	March 25, 2013	1.75
Rich realizes the love triangle he has created has to come to an end. Joe accompanies Tahiry to the Dominican Republic for more than just support. Mendeecees and Yandy's family is about to embark on something that can ultimately tear them apart. guest stars: Tiffany (Rich's ex-girlfriend), Kimbella (Yandy's friend), Jewel (Rich's mother), Victor (Tahiry's father) Although credited, Erica, Winter and Rashidah do not appear.
32	12	"One Day at a Time"	April 1, 2013	1.78
Joe and Tahiry deal with the realizations they've made, which involves the fate of his relationship with Kaylin. Deep secrets are revealed between Rich and Erica. Yandy copes with the recent drama surrounding her family. guest stars: Tiffany (Rich's ex-girlfriend), Jewel, Peter Gunz, Mona Scott-Young (CEO, Monami Entertainment) cameo: Cisco Although credited, Winter does not appear.
33	13	"Reunion – Part 1"	April 8, 2013	1.80
The drama unfolds as the cast reunites to get into all the issues, the beef and the madness that occurred during and after the cameras rolled. host: Mona Scott-Young; DJ: Funkmaster Flex guest stars: Jewel, Fay
34	14	"Reunion – Part 2"	April 15, 2013	2.35
The drama continues. The cast confronts Jen and Cons on their racially sensitive comments. Tiffany explains her situation with Erica. Yandy gets emotional about Mendeecees. A fight breaks out between Joe and Consequence. host: Mona Scott-Young; DJ: Funkmaster Flex guest stars: Jewel, Tiffany Although credited, Winter does not appear.

== Webisodes ==
=== Check Yourself ===
Love & Hip Hop New York: Check Yourself, which features the cast's reactions to each episode, was released weekly with every episode on digital platforms.

List of Love & Hip Hop New York: Check Yourself Season 3 episodes

Episode	Title	Featured cast members	Ref
1	"Season 3 Premiere Screening Party"	Yandy, Rich, Tahiry, Rashidah, Mona Scott-Young, Joe, Lore'l, Erica, Winter, Raqi, Kaylin	
2	"Cast Reactions"	Joe, Raqi, Jen, Consequence, Rich	
3	"Cast Reactions"	Yandy, Mendeecees, Olivia, Consequence, Rich, Joe, Tahiry	

=== Bonus scenes ===
Deleted scenes from the season's episodes were released weekly as bonus content on VH1's official website.

List of Love & Hip Hop: New York Season 3 bonus scenes

Episode	Title	Featured cast members	Ref
1	"Truth or Truth"	Tahiry, Joe	

== Music ==
Several cast members had their music featured on the show and released singles to coincide with the airing of the episodes.

List of songs performed and/or featured in Love & Hip Hop: New York season three
Title	Performer	Album	Episode(s)	Notes	Ref
Turn Up	Consequence	single	2, 6	performed in rehearsal space played in studio session	
Driving In Reverse (feat. Paula Campbell)	Consequence	single	3	played in studio session	
Where Do I Go From Here?	Erica Mena	single	5, 6, 7	performed in studio session	
Devil (feat. Shannon Jones)	Tahiry Jose (as Tahiry)	single	5, 6, 9	performed in studio session featured in music video shoot	
Looka Here Baby	Consequence	single	6	played in car scene	
Words of a Chameleon	Joe Budden	A Loose Quarter	6	performed onstage	
Back Down to Earth	Consequence	single	8	background music	
Where Do I Go From Here?	Olivia	single	9	performed in studio session	
