= Love & Hip Hop: New York season 1 =

Love & Hip Hop: New York
- Season 1
- DVD cover
- Starring: Chrissy Lampkin; Emily Bustamante; Olivia Longott; Somaya Reece
- No. of episodes: 9

Release
- Original network: VH1
- Original release: March 6 – May 16, 2011

Season chronology
- Next → Season 2

The first season of the reality television series Love & Hip Hop aired on VH1 from March 6, 2011 until May 2, 2011. The season was primarily filmed in New York City, New York. It was executively produced by Mona Scott-Young for Monami Entertainment, Toby Barraud and Stefan Springman for NFGTV, Kenny Hull for Interloc Films, and Jim Ackerman and Jeff Olde for VH1.

The series chronicles the lives of several women and men in the New York area, involved in hip hop music. It consists of 9 episodes, including a reunion special hosted by Angie Martinez.

== Production ==
The series was first mentioned in VH1's programming development report in early 2010 as Diary of a Hip Hop Girlfriend. On January 4, 2011, VH1 announced that Love & Hip Hop would make its series premiere on March 6, 2011, as an eight episode series. The first season was later expanded to nine episodes to include the first season reunion, which aired on May 16, 2011. The series would star Jim Jones' girlfriend Chrissy Lampkin, Fabolous's girlfriend Emily Bustamante, Olivia Longott and aspiring rapper Somaya Reece, with Jim Jones, his mother Nancy Jones, Somaya's manager Maurice Aguilar and Olivia's manager Rich Dollaz in supporting roles. Swiss Beatz's ex-wife Mashonda would appear in a minor supporting role.

The season was released on DVD in region 1 on June 26, 2012.

== Synopsis ==
Hip hop. You think you know what it's about cause you saw it in the music video, right? You're in the game, living the high life. Private jet, iced out, sipping Cristal by the pool. But don't get it twisted. Behind the Bentleys and the bling, hip hop is a brutal boy's club. And for a woman trying to make it hers, it can be a real grind. Whether she's a rapper, trying to break through, fighting off the haters, or a rapper's girlfriend trying to get that ring. Will he ever get it together or will she have to forget him forever? This life isn't easy for a woman, even for a singer who's had success but is now struggling to get back on top. You'll see that everything in hip hop has two sides. Sure, there are the perks but beware of the pitfalls. Cause it ain't all fair, in love and hip hop.

— opening monologue

Chrissy has been with rapper Jim Jones for six years but she is struggling to take their relationship to the next level. Emily has been with rapper Fabolous for eight years and has a son by him, however, he still refuses to claim her in public as anything but his stylist. Olivia is a R&B singer desperate to get back in the limelight after a series of career misfires. Somaya is a Latina rapper who has recently arrived in New York City, hungry to kickstart her music career.

When Somaya pursues Jim to collaborate on a track, she ignites a feud with Chrissy. The two get into a huge argument at a yacht party. When Somaya's manager Maurice makes reference to Jim's alleged money issues during the fight, Jim comes after him on the streets of New York. Blaming Olivia for the entire fiasco, Somaya puts her on blast in an online interview, angering Olivia's manager Rich. Meanwhile, under the advice of Mashonda, whose ex-husband Swiss Beatz famously left for Alicia Keys, Emily contemplates leaving Fab for good. Chrissy takes matters into her own hands and proposes to Jim, provoking a violent meltdown from his mother Nancy.

=== Reception ===
Jon Caramanica of The New York Times praised the show's deconstruction of the public image of rappers, as well as the quality of the production values with "slick, beautiful shots of the women driving spectacular cars with no men in sight". However, he was critical of the "needless filler drama" between Lampkin and Reese, a criticism that was shared by other critics who felt the "endless catty arguments and trashy behavior" detracted from the show's message and was too derivative of The Real Housewives franchise.

== Cast ==
=== Starring ===
- Chrissy Lampkin (9 episodes)
- Emily Bustamante (9 episodes)
- Olivia Longott (9 episodes)
- Somaya Reece (8 episodes)

=== Also starring ===
- Jim Jones (8 episodes)
- Mashonda (3 episodes)
- Maurice Aguilar (6 episodes)
- Nancy "Mama" Jones (5 episodes)
- Rich Dollaz (7 episodes)

Producer Cite On The Beat appears in several episodes as a guest star. The show also features minor appearances from notable figures within the hip hop industry and New York's social scene, including Darrelle Revis of the New York Jets, photographer Felix Natal Jr., Dipset members Freekey Zekey and Juelz Santana, Mama Jones' friend Freddie Robinson Jr., Somaya's ex-boyfriend X.O., producer K-Mack, music video director Rage, vlogger DJ Vlad and Emily's children Taina and Johan.

Yandy Smith appears briefly in the background of Chrissy's proposal party, she would go on to appear in a larger role in season two. The season's opening monologue includes archival clips from various hip-hop videos, such as 50 Cent's "Candy Shop" and Fabolous' "Baby Don't Go", which features appearances from future Love & Hip Hop: Atlanta and Love & Hip Hop: Miami cast members Lil Scrappy and Shay Johnson.

== Episodes ==
| No. overall | No. in season | Title | Original release date | US viewers (millions) |
|---|---|---|---|---|
| 1 | 1 | "Love & Hip Hop" | March 6, 2011 | 1.93 |
Rapper Somaya Reece arrives in NY. Emily contemplates her relationship with rapper Fabolous. Chrissy discovers that her boyfriend Jim Jones is collaborating with Somaya. Chrissy and Somaya clash at an NBA draft party. guest stars: Cito on the Beat
| 2 | 2 | "Birthday" | March 21, 2011 | 0.81 |
Chrissy and Mama Jones plan a birthday party for Jim. Emily asks her client, Darrelle, about his relationship with Olivia. Somaya's manager Maurice pushes her too far on a sexy photo shoot. guest stars: Darrelle Revis, Cito on the Beat cameo: Felix Natal Jr., Freekey Zekey, Juelz Santana, Freddie Robinson Jr. Maurice and Mama Jones join the supporting cast.
| 3 | 3 | "The Yacht" | March 28, 2011 | 0.68 |
Emily confronts Olivia about her relationship with Darrelle. The girls get together for a day on a yacht. Things turn nasty when Somaya presses Chrissy on her failed collaboration with Jim Jones. cameo: Rich Dollaz
| 4 | 4 | "Aftermath" | April 4, 2011 | 0.73 |
Jim confronts Somaya's manager Maurice for talking trash about Chrissy. Somaya finds comfort in the arms of her ex-boyfriend X.O. guest stars: X.O., Cito on the Beat cameo: Rich Dollaz
| 5 | 5 | "A Voice" | April 11, 2011 | 0.89 |
Emily visits Mashonda at the run-down house she shared with her ex-husband Swizz Beats. Mashonda dares Emily to find her voice. Olivia breaks down over her career. Somaya lays into Olivia for sparking the fight between Jim and Maurice. cameo: K. Mack; Rich joins the supporting cast.
| 6 | 6 | "Proposal" | April 18, 2011 | 0.69 |
Chrissy decides she's going to propose to Jim and comes up with a sexy way to do it. Olivia performs at an important industry showcase. Chrissy has second thoughts about her elaborate proposal. cameo: Yandy Smith; Although credited, Somaya does not appear.
| 7 | 7 | "Hold You Down" | April 25, 2011 | 1.18 |
Chrissy proposes to Jim, he responds with "I'm with you". Mama Jones is mad about the secret news. Fab skips Emily's family photo shoot. Olivia helps Jim make a song for Chrissy. Somaya slams Olivia online. Olivia's manager vows revenge. cameo: Rage, DJ Vlad, Taina Williams, Johan Jackson
| 8 | 8 | "Me Against the Joneses" | May 2, 2011 | 0.80 |
Jim is reluctant to plan a future with Chrissy. Emily seriously contemplates her relationship after a new Fab rumor emerges. Rich confronts Somaya for dissing Olivia. Chrissy tries to mend ways with Mama Jones but it goes sour.
| 9 | 9 | "Reunion" | May 16, 2011 | 1.26 |
The cast is reunited. Chrissy explains her problems with Somaya. Emily and Olivia throw shade at each other's love lives. Somaya and Maurice come face to face with Olivia and Rich. Chrissy gets emotional about her relationship with Jim. Mama Jones and Chrissy have a heated exchange. host: Angie Martinez

== Webisodes ==
=== Bonus scenes ===
Deleted and extended scenes from the season's episodes were released weekly as bonus content on VH1's official website.

Two scenes feature Chrissy's personal trainer Scott, who appears in green screen segments like the other supporting cast members, suggesting he originally had a larger role on the show but it never made it to air.

List of Love & Hip Hop: New York Season 1 bonus scenes

| Episode | Title | Featured cast members | Ref |
|---|---|---|---|
| 1 | "Bonus Clip" | Somaya, Cito on the Beat | |
| 1 | "Somaya Preps for NBA Draft Party" | Somaya, Maurice, Cito on the Beat | |
| 2 | "Chrissy & Olivia Have a Heart-To-Heart Chat" | Chrissy, Olivia | |
| 2 | "Jim Jones' Mom and Girlfriend Ride a Mechanical Bull" | Chrissy, Mama Jones | |
| 3 | "Stylin' Jim Jones" | Jim Jones, Chrissy | |
| 3 | "Iced" | Maurice, Somaya | |
| 3 | "The Somaya Reece Bandwagon" | Emily, Chrissy | |
| 4 | "Checking Maurice" | Chrissy, Olivia | |
| 4 | "Throw Up and Clean It Up" | Chrissy, Olivia, Scott | |
| 4 | "Independence" | Chrissy, Jim Jones | |
| 5 | "Olivia's Blind Date" | Olivia, Scott | |
| 5 | "Emily Hangs Out with Her Dad" | Emily, Johan, Hector | |
| 6 | "Somaya's Date" | Somaya, Ki'Ameer | |
| 6 | "Chrissy's Private Burlesque Lesson" | Chrissy, Jo Weldon | |
| 7 | "Mama Jones is the HBIC" | Mama Jones, Ethel | |
| 8 | "Sexy Slumber Party" (Extended scene) | Chrissy, Emily, Olivia | |

== Music ==
Several cast members had their music featured on the show and released singles to coincide with the airing of the episodes.

List of songs performed and/or featured in Love & Hip Hop: New York season one
| Title | Performer | Album | Episode(s) | Notes | Ref |
|---|---|---|---|---|---|
| Ohh Baby Baby | Somaya Reece | single | 1 | featured in music video | |
| Dale Mami (feat. Lumidee) | Somaya Reece | single | 1 | played in studio session | |
| Would You Still Love Me? (feat. X.O.) | Somaya Reece | single | 2, 3, 4, 7 | performed in studio session and onstage featured in music video shoot | |
| We Fly High | Jim Jones | Hustler's P.O.M.E. (Product of My Environment) | 3 | played in studio session | |
| December | Olivia | single | 5, 6, 8 | performed in studio session and onstage featured in music video shoot | |
| Walk Away | Olivia | single | 6 | performed onstage | |
| Hold You Down (feat. Olivia) | Jim Jones | single | 8 | performed in studio session | |
