= Love & Hip Hop: New York season 8 =

Love & Hip Hop: New York
- Season 8
- Cover used by the iTunes Store
- Starring: Yandy Smith-Harris; Bianca Bonnie; Mariahlynn; Juju C.; DreamDoll; Anaís; Lil' Mo; Felicia "Snoop" Pearson; Remy Ma
- No. of episodes: 18

Release
- Original network: VH1
- Original release: October 30, 2017 – March 12, 2018

Season chronology
- ← Previous; Season 7 Next → Season 9

The eighth season of the reality television series Love & Hip Hop: New York aired on VH1 from October 30, 2017 until March 12, 2018. The season was primarily filmed in New York City, New York. It is executively produced by Mona Scott-Young and Stephanie R. Gayle for Monami Entertainment, Toby Barraud, Stefan Springman, Mala Chapple, David DiGangi, Lauren Veteri and Michael Carrozza for Eastern TV, and Nina L. Diaz, Liz Fine and Vivian Gomez for VH1.

The series chronicles the lives of several women and men in the New York area, involved in hip hop music. It consists of 18 episodes, including a two-part reunion special hosted by Nina Parker.

== Production ==
The cast of the eighth season, from left to right: Juju, Mariahlynn, Yandy, Bianca, Remy, Lil' Mo, Anaís and Snoop.

The eighth season title screen.

On October 3, 2017, VH1 announced that Love & Hip Hop would be returning for an eighth season on October 30, 2017. This season featured an entirely new opening credits sequence. With the exception of Kimbella Vanderhee and Cardi B who left the show, all main cast members from the previous season returned. Cam'ron's fiancée Juju C. was promoted to the main cast, alongside newcomers Anaís and Lil' Mo. Karl Dargan, Safaree Samuels, Navarro Gray, his girlfriend Ashley Diaz, her sister Ayisha Diaz, rapper Jaquáe, video vixen Sophia Body, Bad Girls Club star DreamDoll, rapper Brittney Taylor, singer James R., K. Michelle: My Life cast member Jonathan Fernandez and singer Trent Crews would join the supporting cast. Grafh and Kiyanne would also appear in supporting roles. On October 20, 2017, a royalty-themed promo "Stay Queening'" was released, with Remy Ma introducing "the new queens of New York" - Lil' Mo, Anaís, Brittney Taylor and DreamDoll. On October 24, 2017, VH1 released a five-minute "super" trailer.

On October 18, 2017, nearly two weeks before the season eight premiere, VH1 aired Dirty Little Secrets, a special featuring unseen footage and deleted scenes from the show's first seven seasons, along with interviews with the show's cast and producers. On November 16, 2017, VH1 announced that Remy & Papoose: A Merry Mackie Holiday, a holiday special starring Remy Ma and Papoose, would air on December 18, 2017. On February 12, VH1 aired Love & Hip Hop: The Love Edition, a Valentine's Day special featuring clips from the show and interviews with cast members from all franchises.

== Synopsis ==
New York, a city where hip hop meets opportunity. There's enough room for everybody to play the game but the game can get messy with family breaking the rules. The brightest stars will always shine through and the taste of fame is hard to resist. In this business, the line can get blurred. Relationships are tested when trust is in question. Love is not always a two-way street. Even the most loving relationships have twists and turns. Friend and foe, everyone and anyone is competition. When it comes to this game, we all have a role to play. Its time to come together and stand united. This is love and hip hop.

— Remy Ma, opening monologue

Yandy's marriage becomes strained when her mother-in-law Judy starts to interfere with her business. Singer Anaís, frustrated by the state of her career and stuck in a miserable marriage, becomes recklessly flirtatious, culminating in a torrid affair with Rich. Safaree returns to New York looking for love. Mariahlynn's new man James R. creates new problems for her. Bianca's violent rivalry with fellow rapper Brittney Taylor threatens to derail both of their careers. Singer Lil' Mo and her husband, boxer Karl Dargan have the perfect marriage and family, but social media accusations might put all of it in jeopardy.

=== Reception ===
This season was poorly received by viewers, with ratings dipping below 2 million viewers for the first time in four years. A scene featuring Yandy speaking into an apparently unplugged telephone was widely ridiculed and condemned as proof of the show's decline and reliance on increasingly fabricated storylines. Former cast member Erica Mena criticized the new cast and the season's storylines, particularly Yandy's, calling them "boring". Comedian KendallKyndall, who has recapped the show for years and hosted live streams and interviews for this season for VH1.com, also criticized the season's rushed and confusing editing, weak storylines and uninspiring casting.

== Cast ==
=== Starring ===
- Yandy Smith-Harris (13 episodes)
- Bianca Bonnie (12 episodes)
- Mariahlynn (15 episodes)
- Juju C. (16 episodes)
- Anaís (17 episodes)
- Lil' Mo (8 episodes)
- Felicia "Snoop" Pearson (12 episodes)
- Remy Ma (14 episodes)

=== Also starring ===
- Papoose (12 episodes)
- DJ Self (17 episodes)
- Safaree Samuels (15 episodes)
- Rich Dollaz (14 episodes)
- Navarro Gray (12 episodes)
- Brittney Taylor (14 episodes)
- Judy Harris (4 episodes)
- Jaquáe (16 episodes)
- Jonathan Fernandez (15 episodes)
- James R. (9 episodes)
- Ashley Diaz (7 episodes)
- DreamDoll (14 episodes)
- Sophia Body (8 episodes)
- Karl Dargan (8 episodes)
- Grafh (5 episodes)
- Ayisha Diaz (4 episodes)
- Trent Crews (4 episodes)
- Kiyanne (9 episodes)
- Hennessy Carolina (1 episode)

DJ Webstar, Safaree's mother Shirley Samuels, Anaís' husband Ruben Brito, Rich's mother Jewel Escobar and Peter Gunz appear as guest stars in several episodes. Mendeecees Harris appears via phone call conversations with Yandy, as he was incarcerated during filming. The show also features minor appearances from notable figures within the hip hop industry and New York's social scene, including Dr. Jeff, Dr. Miami, Fetty Wap and Love & Hip Hop: Miami's Trina. Tara Wallace returns in an uncredited cameo appearance.

== Episodes ==
No. overall	No. in season	Title	Original release date	US viewers (millions)
96	1	"Unity"	October 30, 2017	2.21
Safaree arrives. Bianca and Brittney's feud reignites. guest stars: DreamDoll, Ruben Brito (Anaís' husband), Webstar, Mendeecees Harris, Shaneequewa Samuels (Safaree's sister), Samantha Mitchell (Safaree's sister), Shirley Samuels (Safaree's mother), Grafh Juju, Anais and Lil' Mo are added to the opening credits, replacing departing cast members Kimbella and Cardi B. Safaree, Navarro and Brittney Taylor join the supporting cast. Jonathan Fernandez, Mariahlynn, James R., Sophia Body, Jaquáe, Lil' Mo and Karl appear in the opening monologue sequence only.
97	2	"Rubbed the Wrong Way"	November 6, 2017	1.98
Safaree and DreamDoll form a connection. Jaquáe attempts to mediate between Bri and Bianca. Anais meets Rich. guest stars: Mendeecees, Ayisha Diaz Jaquáe, Jonathan, James R., Ashley and DreamDoll join the supporting cast. Although credited, Lil' Mo, Snoop, and Remy do not appear.
98	3	"Bodied"	November 13, 2017	1.89
James R pits Mariahlynn and Sophia Body against each other. Navarro attempts to mend the rift between Anais and Ashley. guest stars: Justin (Lil' Mo's son) Sophia Body and Karl join the supporting cast. Although credited, Yandy and Snoop do not appear.
99	4	"Reckless"	November 20, 2017	1.82
Yandy gets revenge on Judy. Jonathan and Anais meet up to try and fix their friendship. guest stars: Mendeecees, Bella, Rob (Judy's date) Grafh joins the supporting cast. Although credited, Bianca and Remy do not appear.
100	5	"Streets Are Talking"	November 27, 2017	1.80
Yandy cuts ties with Bianca. Rich and Anais give into temptation. guest stars: Dr. Jeff Gardere
101	6	"Puppy Love"	December 4, 2017	1.81
James R gives Sophia a puppy. guest stars: Jewel (Rich's mom), Trent Crews Although credited, Mariahlynn, Juju and Snoop do not appear.
102	7	"Slippin'"	December 11, 2017	1.84
Rich and Anais reveal their relationship to Navarro. guest stars: Dr. Miami, Fetty Wap Ayisha joins the supporting cast. Although credited, Yandy, Bianca, Juju and Lil' Mo do not appear.
103	8	"Catfished"	December 18, 2017	1.51
Jonathan exposes Trent. guest stars: Dr. Shefali Shastri, MD, Shirley (Safaree's mother), Kiyanne, Wendy (acting coach), Jackie (Juju's sister) Trent Crews joins the supporting cast. Although credited, Yandy and Lil' Mo do not appear.
104	9	"Bad Reputation"	December 25, 2017	1.10
Tensions grow between Mariahlynn and DreamDoll. guest stars: Peter Gunz Although credited, Bianca, Lil' Mo and Snoop do not appear.
105	10	"Single No Mingle"	January 1, 2018	1.84
Safaree confronts DreamDoll. guest stars: Ruben, Stephanie Fisher (Lil' Mo's vocal coach) Although credited, Bianca and Remy do not appear.
106	11	"Gram in Your Hand"	January 8, 2018	1.86
Kiyanne and Jaquáe start dating. guest stars: Ruben, Peter Gunz Kiyanne joins the supporting cast. Although credited, Yandy and Mariahlynn do not appear.
107	12	"Peace Talk"	January 22, 2018	1.84
Jonathan opens up about his conversion therapy experience. guest stars: Jasmine (Jonathan's sister), Trina, DJ Webstar, Jack Lewin, MD (Diabetes Relief Center), Jewel (Rich's mom), Alex B, Miriam (Jonathan's mother) cameo: Tara Wallace, Peter Gunz Although credited, Anaís does not appear.
108	13	"St. Maarten – Part 1"	January 29, 2018	1.84
The girls go on a trip to St Maarten. guest stars: Fetty Wap Although credited, Lil' Mo and Snoop do not appear.
109	14	"St. Maarten – Part 2"	February 5, 2018	1.97
Brittany and Kiyanne fight. guest stars: Jewel (Rich's mom) Although credited, Bianca and Lil' Mo do not appear.
110	15	"Remix"	February 19, 2018	1.95
Jaquáe and Kiyanne attempt to fix their relationship. guest stars: Latonya Clark (DreamDoll's mom), DJ Webstar Although credited, Yandy, Lil' Mo, Snoop, and Remy do not appear.
111	16	"Mix-Up"	February 26, 2018	1.79
Safaree debuts his remix. guest stars: Ruben, Wendy McKenzie (Juju's acting coach), DJ S1 Events (DA Union), T.T. Torrez (Hot 97 radio personality), Shawn Holiday (Columbia Records), DJ Superstar (DA Union), Megan Ryte (Hot 97 DJ personality), DJ Will NYC (DA Union), DJ Executive (DA Union), June Holloway (Music Choice), Shirley Samuels (Safaree's mother), Shaneequewa Samuels (Safaree's sister), William Lake (Caribbean American Chamber of Commerce), Samantha Mitchell (Safaree's sister) Although credited, Bianca and Lil' Mo do not appear.
112	17	"Reunion – Part 1"	March 5, 2018	1.81
Bianca and Brittany address their issues. host: Nina Parker guest stars: Ruben, Mendeecees
113	18	"Reunion – Part 2"	March 12, 2018	1.73
Ayisha takes on Anais. host: Nina Parker guest stars: Ruben, Mendeecees

== Webisodes ==
=== Check Yourself ===
Love & Hip Hop New York: Check Yourself, which features the cast's reactions to each episode, was released weekly with every episode on digital platforms.

=== Bonus scenes ===
Deleted scenes from the season's episodes were released weekly as bonus content on VH1's official website.

== Music ==
Several cast members had their music featured on the show and released singles to coincide with the airing of the episodes.

List of songs performed and/or featured in Love & Hip Hop: New York season eight
Title	Performer	Album	Episode(s)	Notes	Ref
Too Young (feat. Yenz Garcia & Raudy)	Anaís	single	1	performed onstage	
Pop Suttin (feat. Webstar & Trina)	Brittney Taylor	single	1	performed in studio session	
Back On My Bullshit (feat. Fat Joe & Jaquáe)	Papoose	single	2	performed in radio session	
About Every Dollar	Jaquáe	You'll See	2, 10	featured in music video performed onstage	
Everything Nice	DreamDoll	single	2	performed onstage	
Too Much Money	Mariahlynn	single	2	played at launch party	
Hold Me Down	Lil' Mo	single	3	performed in scene	
Bad Girl	James R.	single	3, 8	performed in music video shoot	
Bad Reputation	Trent Crews	single	6	performed in rehearsal	
Tab	Mariahlynn	single	7	performed in studio session	
Paradise (feat. Sean Kingston)	Safaree Samuels	Fur Coat, Vol. 1	7, 9	performed onstage performed in studio session	
30 Minutes	Lil' Mo	single	10	performed in rehearsal	
Talkin Bout	Safaree Samuels	Fur Coat, Vol. 1	10	performed onstage	
Paparazzi	Mariahlynn	single	10, 16	performed onstage	
Team Dream	DreamDoll	Life in Plastic	11	performed in studio session	
Hostage	Anaís	single	13	performed onstage	
Wake Me Up (feat. Lil' Kim)	Remy Ma	7 Winters and 6 Summers	14	performed in music video shoot	
Yes I Know	Bianca Bonnie	10 Plus	15	performed onstage	
Shake Sum	Jaquáe	single	15	performed in music video shoot	
Melanin Magic (Pretty Brown) (feat. Chris Brown)	Remy Ma	7 Winters and 6 Summers	16	played at release party	
