= Love & Hip Hop: New York season 10 =

Love & Hip Hop: New York
- Season 10
- Cover used by the iTunes Store
- Starring: Yandy Smith-Harris; Joe Budden; Rich Dollaz; Kimbella Vanderhee; Remy Ma & Papoose; Cyn Santana; Chrissy Lampkin; Erica Mena & Safaree
- No. of episodes: 14

Release
- Original network: VH1
- Original release: December 16, 2019 – March 9, 2020

Season chronology
- ← Previous; Season 9

The tenth and final season of the reality television series Love & Hip Hop: New York first aired on VH1 on December 16, 2019 until March 9, 2020. The season was primarily filmed in New York City, New York and executive produced by Mona Scott-Young, Stephanie R. Gayle and Maricarmen "MC" Lopez for Monami Entertainment and Dan Cesareo, Lucilla D'Agostino, Donna Edge-Rachell, Kimberly Osorio, Shelley Sinha and Michael Carrozza for Big Fish Entertainment. Nina L. Diaz, Lashan Browning and Phakiso Collins are executive producers for VH1.

== Production ==
On September 12, 2019, it was reported that several former cast members had begun filming the show for its tenth anniversary season, with Big Fish Entertainment taking over the show from Eastern TV. After a seven-year hiatus, Chrissy Lampkin and Jim Jones would return to franchise, along with Olivia Longott, Somaya Reece, Erica Mena and Tahiry Jose. New cast members would include rappers Jennaske, Phresher and his girlfriend Jenn Coreano. Danny García and Erica Mendez were also initially reported as cast members and Emily Bustamante was reportedly in talks to return but ultimately did not appear. Mama Jones, Cisco Rosado and Peter Gunz would return later in the season.

On November 4, 2019, VH1 announced Love & Hip Hop: New York would be returning for a tenth season on December 16, 2019, along with a teaser with the tagline "the homecoming begins", confirming Chrissy's return. On December 6, 2019, VH1 released a five-minute supertrailer. This season featured an entirely new opening credits sequence. As with last season, couples in the cast are credited together (in this instance, Remy Ma and Papoose, and Erica Mena and Safaree).

The season was planned to air in two parts, for the first time in the show's history. Part one of the season aired from December 16, 2019 until March 9, 2020, while part two was set to air in spring. On an episode of his podcast, released on March 26, 2020, Joe Budden confirmed the show was still filming, despite the COVID-19 pandemic. However, he refused to continue filming and potentially risk his health, telling a producer, "There’s no Joe story to continue right now. I’ve closed things with Cyn. I’ve closed things with everybody. There is nothing for me to report to right this second. And if there was, I wouldn’t come." The remaining episodes of the season were eventually postposed indefinitely due to the virus.

== Synopsis ==
They say that when you come home, everything looks and feels the same, and you realize what's changed is you. Being home brings back all sorts of memories. Jim and I, we were the day ones, we started this thing. From fights to proposals, we put it all out there. But when it all fell apart, I chose to walk away. But you know, you should never say never. It's been almost ten years and a lot has happened. There's been hook-ups and heartbreaks. Some families experienced new beginnings while other relationships came to end. The cost of fame is high and somebody's always paying the price. In the world of Love & Hip Hop, nothing is sacred. So give it your best shot, because in this city, only the strong survive.

— Chrissy Lampkin, opening monologue

== Cast ==
=== Starring ===
- Yandy Smith-Harris (13 episodes)
- Joe Budden (10 episodes)
- Rich Dollaz (11 episodes)
- Kimbella Vanderhee (9 episodes)
- Remy Ma (10 episodes)
- Papoose (12 episodes)
- Cyn Santana (13 episodes)
- Chrissy Lampkin (11 episodes)
- Erica Mena (12 episodes)
- Safaree Samuels (12 episodes)

=== Also starring ===
- Jonathan Fernandez (12 episodes)
- Tahiry Jose (10 episodes)
- Juju C. (6 episodes)
- Phresher (10 episodes)
- Jennaske (4 episodes)
- Jenn Coreano (9 episodes)
- Jim Jones (8 episodes)
- Olivia Longott (4 episodes)
- Somaya Reece (2 episodes)
- Mama Jones (2 episodes)
- Cisco Rosado (3 episodes)
- Peter Gunz (2 episodes)

DJ Drewski, Judy Harris and Amina Buddafly return in guest roles, while Sky Landish, Mariahlynn and Anaís appear in uncredited cameos. Mendeecees Harris and Juelz Santana appear via phone call conversations with Yandy and Kimbella, as they were incarcerated during filming. The show also features minor appearances from notable figures within the hip hop industry and New York's social scene, including Fat Joe, Ras Baraka, Cory Gunz, DJ Kay Slay and Love & Hip Hop: Atlanta's Karlie Redd and Sierra Gates.

== Episodes ==
No. overall	No. in season	Title	Original release date	U.S. viewers (millions)
130	1	"Homecoming"	December 16, 2019	1.47
Chrissy Lampkin comes home to Jim Jones with a laundry list of scores to settle. Safaree and Erica Mena are back to plan their wedding. Cyn Santana and Joe Budden finally speak. Remy Ma’s Off Parole party takes a turn when an unexpected guest arrives. guest stars: Jim Jones, Juju, Fat Joe cameo: Lexington Budden, Reminisce MacKenzie Mackie Chrissy and Erica Mena return to the opening credits, replacing departing cast members Juelz Santana and Juju, who returns in a supporting role.
131	2	"Messy Boots"	December 16, 2019	1.41
Yandy drops explosive news about Chrissy and Jim, sending Kimbella on the warpath. Erica Mena considers a move that threatens her wedding plans. Remy Ma gets tough love from Fat Joe. Tahiry finds herself in a matchmaking mission with Joe. guest stars: Juju, Fat Joe, Jim Jones, Greg "BigBizzneesss" Parker, Jason Martin (attorney) cameo: Reminisce MacKenzie Mackie Tahiry returns as a supporting cast member.
132	3	"Keeping Up With the Joneses"	December 23, 2019	1.13
Chrissy takes Kimbella and Juju to Philly to try and save her real estate business. Erica and Safaree face a painful decision. Rich is ready to work with up and coming rapper Jennaske. A perfume release is anything but sweet. guest stars: DJ Drewski, Greg "BigBizzneesss" Parker, Jim Jones cameo: Reminisce MacKenzie Mackie Phresher and Jennaske join the supporting cast. Although credited, Joe and Remy do not appear.
133	4	"Some Sticky Big Bizness"	December 30, 2019	1.22
Yandy pitches her business plan to the Mayor of Newark. Joe and Tahiry explore a new relationship. Newcomer Jennaske pits Rich against Phresher. Erica discovers a text that jeopardizes her wedding. Chrissy confronts Yandy. guest stars: Greg "BigBizzneesss" Parker, Ras Baraka (Mayor of Newark), Jamila (Yandy's business partner) cameo: Cory Gunz Jenn joins the supporting cast. Although credited, Remy and Papoose do not appear.
134	5	"Ex’s & Oh’s"	January 6, 2020	1.43
Safaree is forced to set things right to save his wedding. Cyn confronts Erica about her plan to match Tahiry back with Joe. Phresher must fight to keep Jennaske from jumping ship after Jen's public explosion. Remy goes to Miami to finish her album. guest stars: Fat Joe, DJ Kay Slay Although credited, Yandy, Kimbella and Chrissy do not appear.
135	6	"Between a Rock and a Hard Place"	January 13, 2020	1.27
Erica and Safaree’s joint bachelor, bachelorette party takes a turn when an unexpected guest arrives. Yandy gets some surprising news. Jennaske’s decision to work exclusively with Rich causes backlash. Phresher’s past comes back to haunt him. guest stars: Mendeecees, Tony (Rich's business partner), Judy (Mendeecees' mother), Jada, Amina Buddafly Although credited, Kimbella and Chrissy do not appear.
136	7	"Happily Mena After"	January 20, 2020	1.28
After the chaos of his bachelor party, Safaree gets cold feet about the wedding. Erica gets some timely advice from Remy Ma. Tahiry and Joe face off with Jonathan about the matchmaking scheme. Kimbella decides to release Juelz's music. guest stars: Juelz Santana, Shaneequewa (Safaree's sister), Lauren Beamon (wedding planner, Elle Audrey New York), Karlie & Sierra (Love & Hip Hop: Atlanta), Amina Buddafly, King (Erica's son) cameo: DJ Drewski, Sky Landish, Shirley Samuels Although credited, Rich and Cyn do not appear.
137	8	"Whose Birthday Is It Anyway?"	January 27, 2020	1.32
Erica's birthday bash takes a turn when Tahiry confronts Cyn. Jim Jones learns to cook with Joe to rekindle his romance with Chrissy. Jada demands her money back from Phresher. Tahiry gets some terrifying health news. guest stars: Chef Roscoe, Jada Although credited, Rich, Kimbella and Remy do not appear.
138	9	"December to Remember"	February 3, 2020	1.26
Olivia returns to New York to revive her music career but must confront Chrissy and Rich first. Yandy's prison reform protest in Mississippi could jeopardize Mendeecees’ release. Remy's new legal troubles may send her back to prison. guest stars: Mendeecees, TT Torrez (Hot 97 Music Manager), Jamila (Yandy's business partner), Dawn M. Florio (Remy's attorney), Mysonne (raptivist), Dr. Jacquelyn Copeland (radiologist and breast specialist) Olivia returns to the supporting cast. Although credited, Joe and Kimbella do not appear.
139	10	"Lingerie Goes Left"	February 10, 2020	1.22
Yandy hosts an event to raise money for Jonathan's nephew. Rich's investigation into Olivia's money dispute leads him to his old rival Cisco. Jim has a secret to reveal to Mama Jones about Chrissy. Kimbella and Yandy's beef comes to a violent clash. guest stars: Derek (Jonathan’s nephew), Carolina (Jonathan’s cousin), Mama Jones, Jewel (Rich’s mom), Peter Gunz, Cisco cameo: Mariahlynn, Anaís Somaya returns as a supporting cast member. Although credited, Joe, Remy, Papoose, Erica and Safaree do not appear.
140	11	"Spirituali-Tea"	February 17, 2020	1.17
Somaya attempts to mend Yandy and Kimbella's feud with the healing power of her spiritual tea. Joe and Cyn show up together to Erica's baby shower, sending Tahiry on a spiral. Safaree works on his new album. Remy faces her court date with Pap. guest stars: Fatboy SSE
141	12	"Straitt Outta Brooklyn"	February 24, 2020	1.12
Erica's pregnancy is reaching full term but Safaree's new album threatens to pull him away. Jim shows Mama Jones her new house. Phresher has to settle his debt with Jada before Jenn finds out. Remy's legal fate is revealed. guest stars: Jada, Alexius (Jim Jones' sister) Mama Jones returns to the supporting cast. Although credited, Rich and Kimbella do not appear.
142	13	"Mind Your Dollaz"	March 2, 2020	1.10
Olivia meets with Cisco about her money dispute with Rich. Remy puts her new material to the test when she books a major performance. Jim records for Juelz’s new album. Phresher buys an engagement ring. Joe and Cyn define their rekindled relationship. guest stars: Twin (Juelz's brother), Deborah James, Steven Rifkind (CEO Loud/SRC Records), Jada, Joy (Phresher and Jenn’s daughter), Poppa (Phresher and Jenn’s son), Lisa (Jenn’s mother), Sonyia (Phresher's mom), Fat Joe, Cisco cameo: Leandro, Juelz Santana James, Bella James, Santana James, Reminisce MacKenzie Mackie Although credited, Erica and Safaree do not appear.
143	14	"Baby Mena Drama"	March 9, 2020	1.01
Safaree risks missing the birth of his daughter. The Creep Squad's meeting about Olivia goes left. Jenn reconsiders her future with Phresher. Chrissy considers a new opportunity. Yandy prepares for Mendeecees' long awaited prison release. guest stars: Infinity, Judy (Mendeecees' mother) Cisco and Peter return to the supporting cast. Although credited, Joe does not appear.

== Webisodes ==
=== VH1: UnVeiled ===
The season was preceded by VH1: UnVeiled, a web series featuring in-depth interviews with former and current Love & Hip Hop: New York cast members, which were released weekly from November 19, 2019.

List of VH1: UnVeiled episodes

Episode	Title	Featured cast members	Ref
1	"Sidney Starr On The Reality Of Violence Against Black Trans Women"	Sidney Starr	
2	"MariahLynn On The Reality Of Being A Rising Star"	Mariahlynn	
3	"Peter Gunz On His Family & His Past Mistakes"	Peter Gunz	
4	"Tara Wallace on Being a Mother, Actor & Designer"	Tara Wallace	
5	"Jonathan Fernandez on His New Fragrance & Working w/ His Nieces"	Jonathan Fernandez	

=== Check Yourself ===
Love & Hip Hop New York: Check Yourself, which features the cast's reactions to each episode, was released weekly with every episode on digital platforms.

List of Love & Hip Hop New York: Check Yourself Season 10 episodes

Episode	Title	Featured cast members	Ref
1	"Did Joe Cheat?"	Cyn Santana, Rich Dollaz, Jonathan	
2	"Kim Goes Ham at Lunch"	Cyn Santana, Jonathan	
3	"Jonathan's Fragrance Party Goes Left"	Yandy, Jennaske, Cyn Santana, Jonathan, Kimbella	
4	"Jen vs. Jennaske"	Safaree, Phresher, Rich Dollaz, Jennaske, Jonathan, Kimbella	
5	"Safaree Gets Schooled"	Phresher, Jennaske, Jenn, Tahiry, Rich Dollaz	
6	"The Groupie Slayer"	Jennaske, Phresher, Jenn, Tahiry, Rich Dollaz	
7	"The Wedding Crasher"	Jonathan, Phresher	
8	"Phresher Evens the Score"	Jenn, Jennaske, Phresher, Jonathan	
9	"Phresher Wants an Edit"	Jenn, Phresher, Olivia, Rich Dollaz, Jonathan	
10	"The Creep Squad's Reunion & Jonathan's Sleepover Goes Left"	Cyn Santana, Jonathan, Rich Dollaz, Jenn	
11	"Sip Spiritual Tea"	Rich Dollaz, Jenn, Somaya, Cyn Santana	
12	"Moving On Up"	Tahiry, Rich Dollaz, Jenn, Phresher	
13	"Olivia Is Fuming Mad"	Jonathan, Rich Dollaz, Jenn, Phresher	
14	"Happy Wife, Happy Life"	Jonathan, Yandy, Phresher, Rich Dollaz, Jenn	

=== Bonus scenes ===
Deleted scenes from the season's episodes were released weekly as bonus content on VH1's official website.

List of Love & Hip Hop: New York Season 10 bonus scenes

Episode	Title	Featured cast members	Ref
1	"Remy, Safaree and Erica All Have Reasons to Celebrate"	Safaree, Remy Ma, Erica Mena	
2	"Yandy Wonders Whether Chrissy Is a Changed Woman"	Yandy, Jonathan, Juju	
3	"Yandy Wants Her Friendship with Safaree Back"	Yandy, Safaree	
4	"Remy Ma and Papoose Aren't About PHresher's Drama"	Remy Ma, Papoose, Phresher	
5	"Jonathan and Cyn Have Axes to Throw and Hatchets to Bury"	Jonathan, Cyn Santana	
6	"Jen Is Out of Patience with PHresher"	Jen, Cyn Santana	
7	"Introducing Mr. and Mrs. Safaree Samuels" (Extended scene)	Papoose, Remy Ma, Tahiry, Joe Budden, Yandy, Jonathan, Erica Mena, Safaree	
8	"Joe Wants to Stay Away from Erica's Birthday Party"	Joe Budden, Safaree	
9	"Olivia Feels She "Got Got" by Rich Dollaz" (Extended scene)	Rich Dollaz, Phresher, Olivia	
10	"Somaya Has Been All Business Since Leaving New York" (Extended scene)	Yandy, Jonathan, Somaya, Jenn, Cyn Santana, Kimbella	
11	"Is Kimbella as Toxic as Jonathan Claims?"	Jonathan, Chrissy	
12	"Is Remy Cooking Up More Than Just Another Album?"	Remy Ma, Erica Mena	
13	"Mama Jones Sets Things Right with Jim"	Mama Jones, Jim Jones	
14	"Erica Needs Safaree to Step It Up"	Erica Mena, Safaree	
