= Leave It to Stevie =

American television series

- Genre: Reality
- Directed by: Earl "Slick 23" Barlow
- Starring: Stevie J
- Theme music composer: Lofey (Season 1); Stevie J (Season 2)
- Opening theme: "Leave It to Stevie" by Stevie J (Season 2)
- Country of origin: United States
- Original language: English
- No. of seasons: 2
- No. of episodes: 16

Production
- Executive producers: Brad Abramson; Mona Scott-Young; Stevie J; Mala Chapple; Stephanie R. Gayle; Danielle Gelfand; Jeff Grogan; Vivian Gomez; Stefan Springman; Carmen Mitcho; Lashan Browning
- Running time: 20–23 minutes
- Production companies: Eastern TV; Monami Entertainment

Original release
- Network: VH1
- Release: December 19, 2016 – April 30, 2018

Related
- Love & Hip Hop: Atlanta; Stevie J & Joseline: Go Hollywood

Leave It to Stevie is a reality television series featuring American DJ/producer Stevie J. The show premiered on December 19, 2016, on VH1 and is the third spin-off of Love & Hip Hop: Atlanta.

== Series synopsis ==
=== Overview and casting ===
Leave It to Stevie chronicles the life of Grammy Award-winning songwriter Stevie J as he navigates life as a bachelor in Atlanta, Georgia.

Several members of Stevie J's family and inner circle, as well as other cast members from the Love & Hip Hop franchise, appear as supporting cast members or "featured guests" in green screen confessional interview segments throughout the series. They include Grammy Award-winning singer Faith Evans, Stevie's children Savannah Jordan, Sade Jordan, Stevie Jordan Jr. and Eva Jordan and his Love & Hip Hop: Atlanta co-stars Yung Joc, Lil Scrappy and Tommie Lee. Love & Hip Hop: Hollywood's Ray J, Stevie's assistant and lesbian urban model Renaye Diaz, singer Dalvin DeGrate of Jodeci, Mimi Faust and R&B singer Alexis Branch would appear in minor supporting roles in the first season, while comedian Michael Blackson, bodybuilder Lee Haney and singer Kelly Price would make guest appearances.

The show returned for a second season with Stevie's oldest son Dorian joining the cast, along with Love & Hip Hop: Hollywood's Safaree Samuels. Faith Evans, Tommie Lee and Mimi Faust would return in guest appearances. The season would also feature guest appearances from Laz Alonso, Love & Hip Hop: Hollywood's Nikki Mudarris, K. Michelle and Love & Hip Hop: Miami's Amara La Negra.

=== Cast timeline ===
| Cast member | Seasons | |
| Cast member | 1 | 2 |
|---|---|---|
| Stevie J | Starring | Starring |
| Yung Joc | Supporting | Supporting |
| Savannah Jordan | Supporting | Supporting |
| Sade Jordan | Supporting | |
| Lil Scrappy | Supporting | Supporting |
| Faith Evans | Supporting | Guest |
| Stevie Jordan Jr. | Supporting | Supporting |
| Ray J | Supporting | |
| Renaye Diaz | Supporting | |
| Dalvin DeGrate | Supporting | |
| Tommie Lee | Supporting | Guest |
| Mimi Faust | Supporting | Guest |
| Eva Jordan | Supporting | Supporting |
| Alexis Branch | Supporting | |
| Safaree Samuels | | Supporting |
| Dorian Jordan | | Supporting |

== Episodes ==
=== Series overview ===
| Season | Episodes | Originally released | |
| Season | Episodes | First released | Last released |
|---|---|---|---|
| 1 | 8 | December 19, 2016 | February 6, 2017 |
| 2 | 8 | March 26, 2018 | April 30, 2018 |

=== Season 1 (2016–17) ===
| No. overall | No. in season | Title | Original release date | U.S. viewers (millions) |
|---|---|---|---|---|
| 1 | 1 | "Stevie Is Back" | December 19, 2016 | 1.98 |
Stevie readjusts to the single life following his public breakup with Joseline. Joc and Scrappy plan a guys' night out. Stevie's daughters organize a yard sale to help their dad start anew. guest stars: Stevie Jr. (Stevie J's son), Charese cameo: Special Joseline Hernandez appears in archival footage.
| 2 | 2 | "Southern Discomfort" | December 26, 2016 | 1.77 |
When Ray J visits, Stevie wants to show him a good time. Stevie begins to fall for an old friend, who is reluctant to start a relationship. cameo: Special Faith Evans, Stevie Jr. and Ray J join the supporting cast.
| 3 | 3 | "Standing Down" | January 2, 2017 | 1.81 |
Stevie challenges Yung Joc to a comedy contest and learns stand-up comedy is a lot harder than it looks. Stevie's daughters won't stop fighting, so Stevie enlists a secret weapon to bring them back together. guest stars: Michael Blackson, Kelly "K Dubb" Walker, Special, Eva (Stevie J's daughter) Renaye join the supporting cast.
| 4 | 4 | "Got to Have Faith" | January 9, 2017 | 1.68 |
Stevie competes with Yung Joc and Scrappy to see who will represent the new brand. Stevie tries to help Tommie move forward with a new career choice. Meanwhile, Faith is having second thoughts about rejecting Stevie. guest stars: Lee Haney, Kelly Price (recording artist) Dalvin DeGrate and Tommie join the supporting cast.
| 5 | 5 | "New Sound" | January 16, 2017 | 1.79 |
When his daughter tells him his new beats are old news, Stevie decides to takes his music in a surprising direction. Stevie's old flame Mimi needs a favor for their daughter Eva, but Stevie isn't sure he's up to the task. guest stars: Navv Greene (car salesman) Mimi and Eva join the supporting cast.
| 6 | 6 | "Fear Itself" | January 23, 2017 | 2.02 |
Stevie, Joc, and Scrappy help each other get over their worst fears. But Stevie's real concern is that his daughter might be getting involved with the wrong boy. guest stars: Vonte
| 7 | 7 | "Come Over" | January 30, 2017 | 1.72 |
Faith is coming to Atlanta, and after three weeks without her, Stevie's very ready for some one-on-one time. Meanwhile, a showcase Stevie set up for Alexis runs into a serious problem. Alexis Branch joins the supporting cast.
| 8 | 8 | "Gone Left" | February 6, 2017 | 1.69 |
Stevie's having trouble with his long-distance relationship with Faith, and a hot tub party Joc throws doesn't make things any easier. Stevie thinks he has a solution, but when he talks to Faith, it doesn't go as he planned. Stevie's daughters say goodbye. cameo: Tresure P.

=== Season 2 (2018) ===
| No. overall | No. in season | Title | Original release date | U.S. viewers (millions) |
|---|---|---|---|---|
| 9 | 1 | "Get Out" | March 26, 2018 | 1.47 |
Savannah convinces Stevie to see a hypnotist to cure his womanizing ways. Meanwhile, Stevie Jr. attempts to break into the modeling world. guest stars: Dorian (Stevie J's son), Jenni Lubozynski (modeling consultant), Sean Wheeler (hypnotist)
| 10 | 2 | "Lawn & Order" | March 26, 2018 | 1.37 |
Stevie overestimates his green thumb when he decides to landscape his backyard himself. Stevie meets an attorney who he pursues for both her heart and her legal skills. guest stars: Dorian (Stevie J's son), Amanda (attorney), Stephanie (Wylde Center)
| 11 | 3 | "The Game of Faith" | April 2, 2018 | 1.13 |
A taping of Hip Hop Squares inspires Stevie and Joc to make a wager. While in LA, Stevie attempts to reignite a romance with Faith Evans. guest stars: Faith Evans, Laz Alonso, Michael Blackson Safaree joins the supporting cast. Love & Hip Hop: Hollywood's Nikki Mudarris and Karrueche Tran appear in footage from their Hip Hop Squares appearance.
| 12 | 4 | "Action Jordan" | April 9, 2018 | 1.17 |
Stevie thinks he needs to bless the world with a Stevie J. action figure, but Scrappy thinks he needs a serious reality check. Motivated to make his dream of a music lounge come true, Stevie turns to K. Michelle for advice. guest stars: K. Michelle
| 13 | 5 | "Parlez Vous Rap Game" | April 16, 2018 | 1.10 |
Stevie refuses to help Dorian launch his rap career, so Savannah and Stevie Jr. step in. Stevie gets culture shock when he tries to woo a French beauty. At K. Michelle's suggestion, Stevie meets with a public relations executive. guest stars: K. Michelle, Tommie, Clorissa Wright (PR consultant), Yvette Ramirez (director of events), Bill Reynolds (wine connoisseur), Amberley Dorian joins the supporting cast.
| 14 | 6 | "Are You Ready to Crumble?" | April 23, 2018 | 1.23 |
Stevie and Scrappy enter the exciting world of semi-pro wrestling; the duo tries to hold their own against the reigning Tag Team Champs; two women test Stevie and Safaree with a yoga challenge.
| 15 | 7 | "Mismatched" | April 30, 2018 | 1.18 |
Stevie can't seem to explain his vision for Sleazy J's so he decides to get his message across with a unique invitation to his first ever pop-up party. Stevie takes it upon himself to find Mr. Right for his daughter, Savannah. guest stars: Shawty (comedian)
| 16 | 8 | "Sleazy J's" | April 30, 2018 | 1.19 |
Stevie throws the inaugural Sleazy J party, a star-studded event, and invites a special someone to be his date. Meanwhile, he is forced to put his chef's hat on to make a unicorn cake for Eva's fundraiser. guest stars: Shawty (comedian), Mimi, Amanda (attorney), Amara La Negra cameo: Just Brittany, Momma Dee

== Development ==
On July 7, 2016, Stevie's estranged partner Joseline Hernandez revealed that their spin-off Stevie J & Joseline: Go Hollywood had been picked up for a second season, however it would not return due to their separation. Instead, Stevie announced he would star in a solo series, The Stevie J Show.

On December 1, 2016, VH1 announced the show, now titled Leave It to Stevie, would make its series premiere on December 19, 2016, back-to-back with the third season of K. Michelle: My Life.
