= Navarro Gray =

American lawyer (born 1979)

Navarro Walker Gray
- Gray in 2016
- Born: September 30, 1979 (age 47); Hackensack, New Jersey, U.S.
- Education: Hackensack High School; Hampton University (BS); Hofstra University School of Law (JD)
- Occupations: Entertainment Lawyer, Criminal Defense Attorney
- Known for: Ronald Isley, Fetty Wap, Internet Money, Cissy Houston, Ty Fyffe
- Partner: Ashley Diaz (2018–present)
- Website: thegrayfirmnj.com entlegal.us

Navarro Gray (born September 30, 1979) is an American lawyer best known for his accomplishments in the entertainment industry - specifically in representing Fetty Wap in obtaining his recording deal with Lyor Cohen's 300 Entertainment and more recently his recording deal with Sony/ATV Music Publishing. He appeared on the reality television show Love & Hip Hop as the attorney for Latin Music star Anais.

Gray is also a litigator and criminal defense attorney. He was appointed the city's public defender becoming the first African-American to hold this position in Hackensack, New Jersey.

== Early life ==
Gray was born in Hackensack, New Jersey.

Gray comes from a family who dedicated themselves to service. His father, Dallas, is a professor at Bergen Community College and a former member of the board of commissioners of the city's housing authority. His late grandfather, George Odell, was the first African American police officer in Bergen County.

Gray attended Fairmount Elementary School and graduated from Hackensack High School in 1997. Growing up, Gray was mentored and spent much time with Hackensack Mayor John Labrosse. Labrosse coached Gray in Little League baseball. Gray also boxed in the Golden Gloves organization at the Police Athletic League under the guidance of Michael Mordaga, Police Director.

Gray received his Bachelor of Science from Hampton University in 2001 where he graduated Cum Laude with honors. In 2006, he was awarded his Juris Doctor from Hofstra University School of Law with a concentration in intellectual property.

Under a new city council Gray was appointed the position of public defender. He is the first African-American to hold the public defender's position in the city's history.

== Legal management ==
=== Fetty Wap legal management ===
In November 2014 Gray secured a publishing contract for Fetty Wap with 300 Entertainment. The commercial debut single titled "Trap Queen," which was released in early 2014, gained major recognition after Gray secured the 300 Entertainment deal and has since become a platinum record with over 130 million plays on SoundCloud.

In November 2015 Gray secured a publishing deal for Fetty Wap with Sony/ATV Music Publishing. The deal includes "Trap Queen" and other songs Fetty Wap contributed writing to on the self-titled debut album.

== Legal practice ==
Navarro Gray was admitted to the New Jersey State Bar and the United States District Court, District of New Jersey in 2008. Prior to being admitted to the State and Federal Bars, he worked as a legal intern for the United States Attorney's Office and a United States District Court Judge. Thereafter, Gray embarked on his legal career as a Law Clerk for the Honorable Edward V. Torack, J.S.C. (retired). He is focused on representing public/government entities, criminal defense, personal injury, discrimination matters and family cases.

He has represented notable personalities such as Fetty Wap, Ronald Isley, Remy Boy Monty, Nick E Beats and Adnan Khan aka Menace (the producer of Desiigner's hit song "Panda" which also appeared on Kanye West's The Life of Pablo album as "Father Stretch My Hands, Pt. 2").

He also successfully negotiated contracts on behalf of his clients with LL Cool J, Bad Boy Entertainment, MTV, Vh1, F.U.E.N.T.S, Universal Music Group, etc., and creates licensing opportunities for producers to have their music appear in television programs, video games, and films.

In 2021 Navarro started working with Ronald Isley, beginning with Ronald's single "Friends & Family" featuring Snoop Dogg, and has a full-album follow up to this single. This project is packaged together with a live concert and documentary elements contained within that. This album will feature Beyoncé, Drake, Rick Ross, Trey Songz, and more. In an interview with Variety, Navarro says, "When people consider ‘Black music,’ they should recognize the legacy of the Isleys, that Ronald Isley should be up there with giants such as Michael Jackson and Prince. The same thing is true of the upcoming biopic. We’re looking for production partners who will take Ron's vision and amplify it, what he perceives through his and his family's eyes. without giving away creative control."

As a defense attorney Gray has also provided legal representation and support in cases such as with Larry McKelvey (father to New York radio personality Charlamagne Tha God) and has appeared on CBS, Fox 5, Pix 11 and Hot 97.

In 2014 a building at 10 Banta Place was renamed the Gray Building in honor of him becoming the city's first African-American public defender.
