= Chrissy & Mr. Jones =

American reality television series

- Genre: Reality
- Starring: Jim Jones; Chrissy Lampkin
- Opening theme: "Better Me" (feat. Robbie Nova)
- Composer: Jim Jones
- Country of origin: United States
- Original language: English
- No. of seasons: 2
- No. of episodes: 16

Production
- Executive producers: Brad Abramson; Mona Scott-Young; Chrissy Lampkin; Jim Jones; Danielle Gelfand; David DiGangi; Josh Richards; Shelly Tatro; Stefan Springman; Toby Barraud
- Running time: 20–23 minutes
- Production companies: Eastern TV; Monami Entertainment

Original release
- Network: VH1
- Release: September 24, 2012 – December 16, 2013

Related
- Love & Hip Hop: New York

Chrissy & Mr. Jones is an American reality television series featuring Chrissy Lampkin and Jim Jones. It premiered on September 24, 2012, on VH1 as a spin-off of Love & Hip Hop: New York. The second season premiered on October 28, 2013. The show did not return for a third season.

Three years after the show's finale, Lampkin and Jones returned in a six-part series, Jim & Chrissy: Vow or Never, which premiered September 1, 2016, on WE tv.

== Series synopsis ==
=== Overview and casting ===
Chrissy & Mr. Jones chronicles Chrissy and Jim's romantic struggles, as well as their business ventures, specifically Jim's Vamp Life clothing brand.

Several members of Chrissy and Jim's inner circle appear as supporting cast members in green screen confessional interview segments throughout the series. They include Chrissy's best friend and former Love & Hip Hop co-star Emily Bustamante, Jim's mother Nancy Jones, Nancy's long-time friend and occasional business partner Freddie Robinson Jr. and celebrity stylist Talia Coles. Chrissy and Jim's housekeeper Paulina and Jim's personal assistant Tina Lauren would appear in minor supporting roles, while Rev. Run, Adrienne Bailon, Talia's boyfriend CJ Hilton, Russell Simmons and Rev.'s wife Justine Simmons would make guest appearances.

The show returned for a second season with Jim's son Joseph "Pudie" Jones II joining the cast, along with Nancy's friend and partner-in crime LaToya "Sassy" Everett and Waka Flocka Flame's mother and business manager Deb Antney, who acts as Chrissy's mentor for her business ventures. Freekey Zekey, photographer Heather Hunter, Damon Dash, author Wahida Clark and Ice-T would make guest appearances.

=== Cast timeline ===
Cast member	Seasons	
Cast member	1	2
Chrissy Lampkin	Starring	Starring
Jim Jones	Starring	Starring
Emily Bustamante	Supporting	Supporting
Nancy "Mama" Jones	Supporting	Supporting
Freddie Robinson Jr.	Supporting	Supporting
Talia Coles	Supporting	
Paulina	Supporting	
Tina Lauren	Supporting	
Pudie Jones		Supporting
Sassy Everett		Supporting
Deb Antney		Supporting

== Episodes ==
=== Series overview ===
Season	Episodes	Originally released	
Season	Episodes	First released	Last released
1	8	September 24, 2012	November 12, 2012
2	8	October 28, 2013	December 16, 2013

=== Season 1 (2012) ===
No. overall	No. in season	Title	Original release date	U.S. viewers (millions)
1	1	"To Be or Not To Be"	September 24, 2012	2.07
Chrissy attempts to discover her lost independence. guest stars: Paulina
2	2	"Eggs & Beggin'"	October 1, 2012	1.41
It's been a long road and the time has come for Chrissy and Jim to talk babies. Freddie attempts to come to terms with his past and apologize for his wrongdoings. Emily and Talia are awarded with a major surprise. guest stars: Paulina, Dr. Althea O'Shaughnessy
3	3	"Scent of a Woman"	October 8, 2012	1.41
Emily takes time out of her day to visit Jim. Chrissy and Emily have a heartwarming conversation.
4	4	"Run to the Rev"	October 15, 2012	1.72
Chrissy and Jim come to terms with their current relationship status and take steps to improve their bond. guest stars: Rev Run
5	5	"Pack Your Bags"	October 22, 2012	1.27
Chrissy is fed up with the problems at home and decides to move into a hotel room. Talia is embarrassed by the pranks pulled by Emily. guest stars: Jojo Brim; Paulina joins the supporting cast.
6	6	"Jacket Racket"	October 29, 2012	2.03
Chrissy and Jim endure a long two week break from each other. Jim finds himself a new personal assistant. guest stars: CJ Hilton, Tina Lauren cameo: Adrienne Bailon, Somaya Reece
7	7	"In Your Business"	November 5, 2012	1.77
Talia and Emily just can't seem to be cordial with each other, and the fighting continues. Jim works to get Chrissy back into his arms. guest stars: Tina (Jim's assistant), Justine Simmons, Russell Simmons (hip hop mogul)
8	8	"Better Me"	November 12, 2012	1.87
Chrissy decides whether to purchase her own residence or end up residing with Jim again. Jim plans a surprise for Chrissy. guest stars: Shawn (Mama's nephew) cameo: CJ Hilton; Tina joins the supporting cast.

=== Season 2 (2013) ===
No. overall	No. in season	Title	Original release date	U.S. viewers (millions)
9	1	"Son Shine"	October 28, 2013	2.89
Jim informs Chrissy that his son Pudie will be moving in with them for the summer. Mama Jones is dealing with her own drama when she discovers that Freddie has been telling lies about their relationship. Pudie and Sassy join the supporting cast.
10	2	"Gifted"	November 4, 2013	2.62
Pudie teaches Jim how to swim. Chrissy plans a celebration for Jim's birthday. Chrissy asks Mama Jones to pick her outfit out for a book cover. guest stars: Prince Malik (artist), Heather Hunter (photographer) cameo: Freekey Zekey; Deb Antney joins the supporting cast.
11	3	"Every Day I'm Hustling"	November 11, 2013	3.00
Chrissy discusses with Jim regarding her managing his clothing line. Mama Jones and Jim teach Pudie about the importance of working hard. guest stars: Wahida Clark (book publisher), Damon Dash (Vampire Life partner), Rocky (designer)
12	4	"Popping Off"	November 18, 2013	2.51
Chrissy is rushing to complete everything prior to her clothing line launching, and feels that Jim isn't contributing much. Mama Jones and Sassy come up with the idea to host a talk show. guest stars: Damon Dash (Vampire Life partner), Rocky (designer), Ice-T (actor/rapper)
13	5	"Pranked"	November 25, 2013	2.49
Jim lets Chrissy host a ladies night. Chrissy is annoyed with the transportation Jim has provided. Mama Jones and Chrissy get revenge on Jim. cameo: DJ Self
14	6	"Into the Woods"	December 2, 2013	2.43
The family goes out for a day in the woods but Jim's fear of nature effects how the trip goes. Mama Jones and Sassy spend a day at the spa. guest stars: James (Jim's friend)
15	7	"Little Big Stacks"	December 9, 2013	2.26
Jim gives Pudie a large amount of cash. Mama Jones is excited about the release of PumKásh.
16	8	"Summer's Over"	December 16, 2013	2.14
Chrissy and Jim go to Miami for vacation while Pudie begins the school year. Jim wants to surprise Chrissy with a dinner made by him, but first Jim learns how to cook. Mama Jones and Pudie go on adventures while Jim and Chrissy are away. While on vacation, Chrissy and Jim realize how much they miss Pudie and decide to go home early. guest stars: Justin Fertitta (chef), Melissa Johnson (realtor), J.C. Zapata (waiter)

== Development ==
On September 7, 2012, VH1 confirmed that Chrissy and Jim would leave Love & Hip Hop, to star in their own spin-off show, now titled Chrissy & Mr. Jones.

== Jim & Chrissy: Vow or Never ==
Chrissy & Mr. Jones
- Also known as: Jim & Chrissy: Vow or Never
- Genre: Reality
- Starring: Jim Jones; Chrissy Lampkin
- Country of origin: United States
- Original language: English
- No. of seasons: 1
- No. of episodes: 6

Production
- Running time: 40-43 minutes
- Production companies: Ish Entertainment; Hey Chauncey Productions

Original release
- Network: WE tv
- Release: September 1 – October 6, 2016

Jim & Chrissy: Vow or Never is a reality series that aired from September 1, 2016, until October 6, 2016, on WE tv. It chronicled the lives of Jim and Chrissy in Miami, Florida. It is not made by the same production company as Chrissy & Mr. Jones and is not considered a part of the Love & Hip Hop franchise.

Jim's mother Nancy returned as a supporting cast member, along with new cast mates Tiffany Barnes and Freekey Zekey.

=== Season 1 (2016) ===
No. in series	No. in season	Title	Original air date
1	1	"Rules of Engagement"	September 1, 2016
Jim and Chrissy move to Miami and decide to finally wed after more than a decade as a couple. Jim gets caught at a strip club. A surprise visitor arrives.
2	2	"Sticks & Stones & Mama Jones"	September 8, 2016
A yacht party with the boys takes precedence for Jim over his first meeting with the wedding planner, which he ditches. A boiling angry Mama Jones is on a mission to get answers when she ambushes Jim and Chrissy in Miami.
3	3	"Mama Cut the Cord"	September 15, 2016
Chrissy breaks down during couples therapy. Jim attempts to loosen ties with his mother in hopes of putting his engagement back on track.
4	4	"Liar, Liar, Wedding Plans on Fire!"	September 22, 2016
Jim makes wedding plans without Chrissy's input. The couple argue in therapy. Chrissy faces off with Mama Jones. Mama Jones is set up on a blind date to distract her from meddling with the couple's plans. Jim sees another woman naked.
5	5	"Naked & Betrayed"	September 29, 2016
Jim is late to dance class for the wedding. Jim's son visits the couple. Tiffany invites Jim and Chrissy to a naked picnic, where a secret is revealed.
6	6	"The Split Track"	October 6, 2016
Chrissy learns of a secret that's been kept from her. The couple make a shocking announcement. Jim attempts to save the wedding.
