= Safaree Samuels =

American actor and rapper (born 1981)

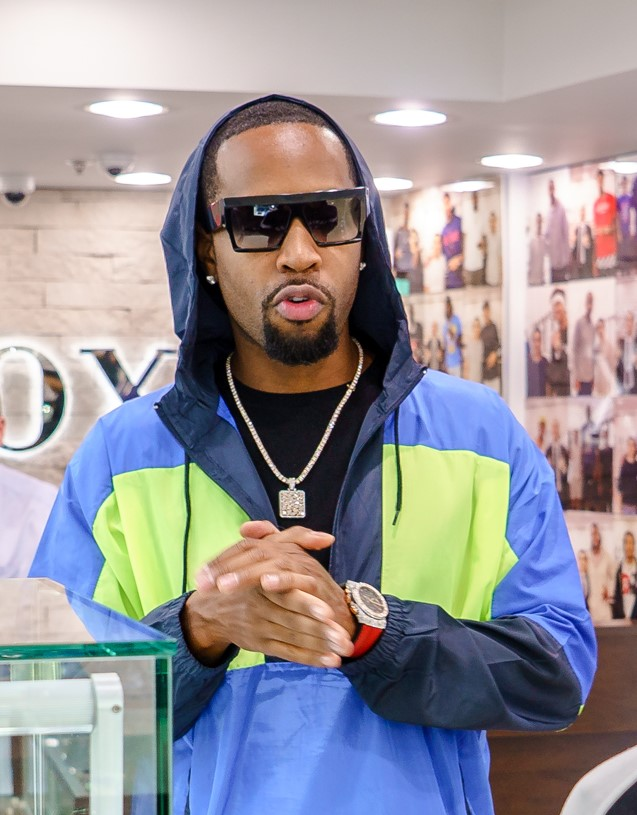
- Samuels in 2019
- Born: Safaree Lloyd Samuels; July 4, 1981 (age 45); Brooklyn, New York City, U.S.
- Occupations: Television actor; rapper
- Years active: 2000–present
- Labels: 916%; Stuntgang; H2O; X-Ray
- Spouse: Erica Mena (m. 2019; div. 2022)
- Children: 2

Safaree Lloyd Samuels (born July 4, 1981) is an American hype man and reality television actor. In the early 2000s, he was a hype man for the New York hip hop group Hoodstars, which included rapper Nicki Minaj. He later gained public attention for dating and being a hype man for Minaj until 2014. In 2016, he joined the cast of the VH1 reality show Love & Hip Hop: Hollywood, and then Love & Hip Hop: New York in 2017. He also joined Love & Hip Hop: Atlanta and Love & Hip Hop: Miami, making him the only Love & Hip Hop cast member to have appeared in all four shows. As a solo artist, he has released one studio album and five mixtapes.

== Early life ==
Safaree Lloyd Samuels was born in Brooklyn on July 4, 1981, to immigrant Jamaican parents. He was raised in Canarsie, Brooklyn.

== Career ==
Samuels was as a hype man for the New York hip hop group Hoodstars, formed in the early 2000s by rapper Loustar, who recruited rappers Seven Up and Nicki Minaj. Samuels was a friend of Loustar from high school. All group members did not want Samuels in the group, but Loustar's father, Bowlegged Lou from Full Force, recommended that they use a hype man, so Loustar decided to keep Samuels. He stated that Samuels was "never really in the group" and was around them as his friend: "He never really had no talent as far as writing ... [with his voice] he emulates who the person he's following ... he was always the hype man, he was never no writing, never no talent, no nothing, he was just what he was, he just hung around." In 2004, the group recorded the entrance song for WWE Diva Victoria, "Don't Mess With", which was featured on the compilation album ThemeAddict: WWE The Music, Vol. 6. Minaj started her solo career after the group disbanded, and Samuels, who dated Minaj, worked for her as a hype man.

In 2012, Samuels appeared in Minaj's music video for "Stupid Hoe". He is in the writing credits of three songs from Minaj's second album, Pink Friday: Roman Reloaded (2012) for ad libs. In 2015, he released the mixtapes, It Is What It Is and It Is What It Is, Vol. 2. In early 2016, he made appearance in the second season of K. Michelle: My Life.

In May 2016, it was announced that Samuels joined the cast of the VH1 reality show Love & Hip Hop: Hollywood for its third season, which premiered in August 2016. In July 2016, he released a new mixtape titled Real Yard Vibes. In August 2017, it was announced that Samuels would compete in the first season of VH1's Scared Famous, which premiered in October 2017.

In 2017, rapper Azealia Banks said in an interview that she did a song with Samuels because she "assumed that he played a part in [some of] Nicki Minaj's hot singles ... but it actually turned out [to be] me writing for him." In February 2018, Samuels was given a Blue & Bougie Impact Award by Blue & Bougie NY for representing Jamaica on VH1. That month, a nude picture and video of Samuels was leaked online. In 2019, he debuted an "Anaconda" line of dildos molded from his own penis. In 2020, Samuels launched an OnlyFans account sharing his amateur pornographic videos for $20 per month.

== Personal life ==
Samuels dated rapper Nicki Minaj from 2003 to 2014. In 2011, a police report was filed after Samuels hit Minaj on her face with a suitcase. In 2016, he attempted to sue Minaj, claiming that she did not credit him on her album The Pinkprint. Minaj said that he tried to extort her, had stolen money from her, "gained so much off of [her] name" and "refuses to let go", and that she asked him to stop trying to contact her. She refuted his claim of writing, stating that neither he nor anyone ever wrote her raps. Samuels dropped the lawsuit.

Samuels became engaged to actress Erica Mena on Christmas Eve 2018. The couple married on October 7, 2019. Their daughter was born on February 3, 2020. On May 4, 2021, he announced that they were expecting their second child. Later that month, Mena filed for divorce from Samuels. On June 28, 2021, he announced the birth of their second child, a boy. They were officially divorced in 2022. He has since dated Love & Hip Hop co star Amara La Negra and later, Eliza Reign.

== Discography ==
=== Studio albums ===
List of albums, with selected details
Title	Details
Strt	Released: January 24, 2020; Label: Stuntgang; Formats: CD, LP, digital download

=== Mixtapes ===
List of mixtapes, with selected details
Title	Details
It Is What It Is	Released: April 7, 2015; Label: Stuntgang; Format: Digital download
It Is What It Is, Vol. 2	Released: December 7, 2015; Label: Stuntgang; Format: Digital download
Real Yard Vibes	Released: July 2016; Label: Stuntgang; Format: Digital download
Fur Coat Vol. 1	Released: November 20, 2017; Label: Stuntgang; Format: Digital download
IDGAF***	Released: July 30, 2021; Label: Stuntgang; Format: Digital download

== Filmography ==
=== Television ===
Year	Title	Role	Notes
2015, 2017	Wild 'n Out	Himself	Special guest
2016	K. Michelle: My Life	Himself	Guest star
2016–2018	Love & Hip Hop: Hollywood	Himself	Supporting (season 3); Main cast (season 4); Guest (season 5)
2017–2020	Love & Hip Hop: New York	Himself	Supporting (season 8); Main cast (seasons 9–10)
2017	Scared Famous	Himself	Contestant
2018	Leave It to Stevie	Himself	Supporting (season 2)
2018	Remy & Papoose: Meet the Mackies	Himself	Guest, 1 episode: "Dadchelor Party"
2020–2023	Love & Hip Hop: Atlanta	Himself	Supporting (seasons 9—11); Main cast (seasons 10a–10b)
2020–2023	Love & Listings	Himself	Guest star
2021	Love & Hip Hop: Secrets Unlocked	Himself	Guest star
2021–2023	Family Reunion: Love & Hip Hop Edition	Himself	Main cast (seasons 2–3)
2022	Bobby I Love You, Purrr	Himself	Episode: "Stay Soft"
2023	I Got a Story to Tell	Detective Hassan	Episode: "I'm So Fateful"
2023–2026	Love & Hip Hop: Miami	Himself	Main cast (seasons 5—7)
2024	House of Villains	Himself	Main cast (season 2)
2025	Ballin 2024	Semaj Anderson	
2025	Ms. Pat Settles It	Himself	Main cast (season 3)
To be released	Schemers	Donovan	Pre—production
To be released	Redeemed †	Knox	Pre—production
To be released	Life After Dark †	Safaree	Pre—production
To be released	The Night Shift †	Mr.Heartbreaker	Pre—production
