= List of songs written by J-Hope =

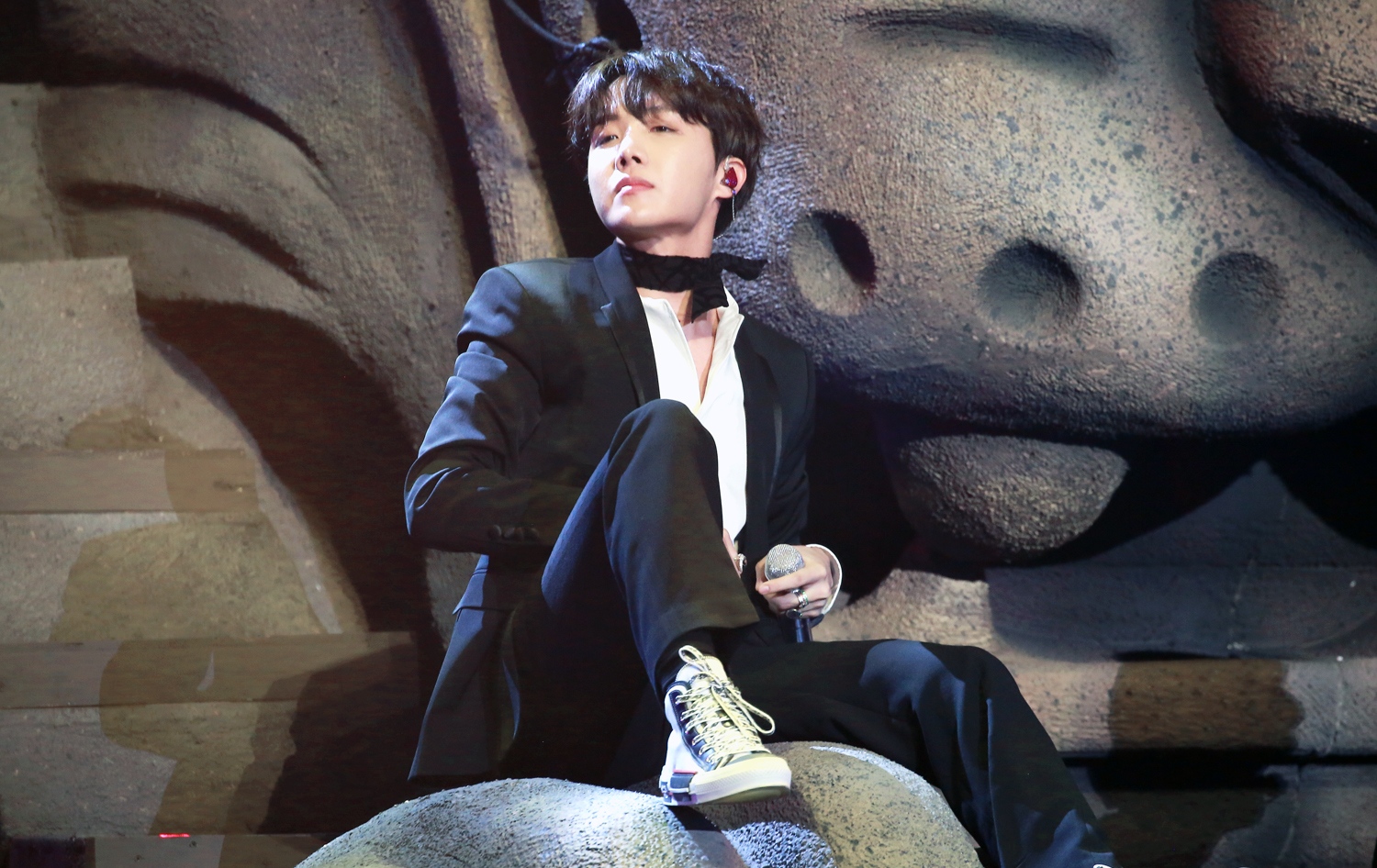
J-Hope performing at the 33rd Golden Disc Awards on January 6, 2019

South Korean rapper J-Hope has written songs for his career as a solo musician, band member, and for other performers. His debut mixtape Hope World (2018) charted in ten countries worldwide, debuting atop the Billboard World Albums chart and peaking at number 30 on the Billboard 200, the highest peak by a Korean soloist at the time of release. J-Hope collaborated with numerous in-house producers at his record label Big Hit Entertainment to create the mixtape and is a credited writer on all seven tracks. The mixtape's lead single "Daydream", which debuted at number one on the Billboard World Digital Song Sales chart, is a house track discussing J-Hope's struggles as a Korean idol presented in an upbeat style. J-Hope conceptualized the song as a means to discuss "the desires and wishes that every person in the world has but [he has] to hold down and cover up" due to his career path. He later released his second solo work in September 2019, a single entitled "Chicken Noodle Soup" featuring American singer Becky G. The song contains lyrics about J-Hope's background in dance, and is performed in three languages: Korean, English, and Spanish. The song peaked at number 81 on the Billboard Hot 100, marking the first time a member of BTS has appeared on the chart as a soloist.

He serves as one of the primary songwriters for the pop and hip hop boy band BTS, of which he is a member, appearing as a credited writer on every album released by the group since their debut in 2013. On these albums he primarily works with the Big Hit production team, including company founder Bang Si-hyuk, and fellow BTS rappers RM and Suga. The trio later collaborated to release the trap diss track "Ddaeng", produced by Suga and Korean record producer Jang Yi-jeong and inspired by traditional Korean instrumentals. He has also penned music for other musical endeavors by BTS members, co-writing the song "Otsukare" for the duo Sope, comprising himself and Suga. In addition, he composed much of the melody for the 2016 ballad "Awake", performed by bandmate Jin as his first solo song. In January 2020, the Korea Music Copyright Association (KOMCA) promoted J-Hope to a full member of the organization due to the worldwide popularity of the BTS songs "Boy with Luv", "Home", and "Blood Sweat & Tears" which he co-wrote.

J-Hope's work as a writer for musicians outside of BTS has been minimal. In 2012, before his official public debut, he featured on the track "Animal" by former labelmate Jo Kwon and was part of the writing team, which included Swedish EDM producer Avicii. J-Hope also worked with South Korean music pioneer Seo Taiji to adjust portions of the track "Come Back Home", from the album Seo Taiji and Boys IV (1995), which was eventually performed by BTS at the Seo Taiji 25th Anniversary concert in August 2017.

As of March 2025, 148 songs have been attributed to him as a writer and composer by KOMCA.

== Songs ==
Key
†	Indicates single
#	Indicates a non-commercial release
‡	Indicates songs written solely by J-Hope

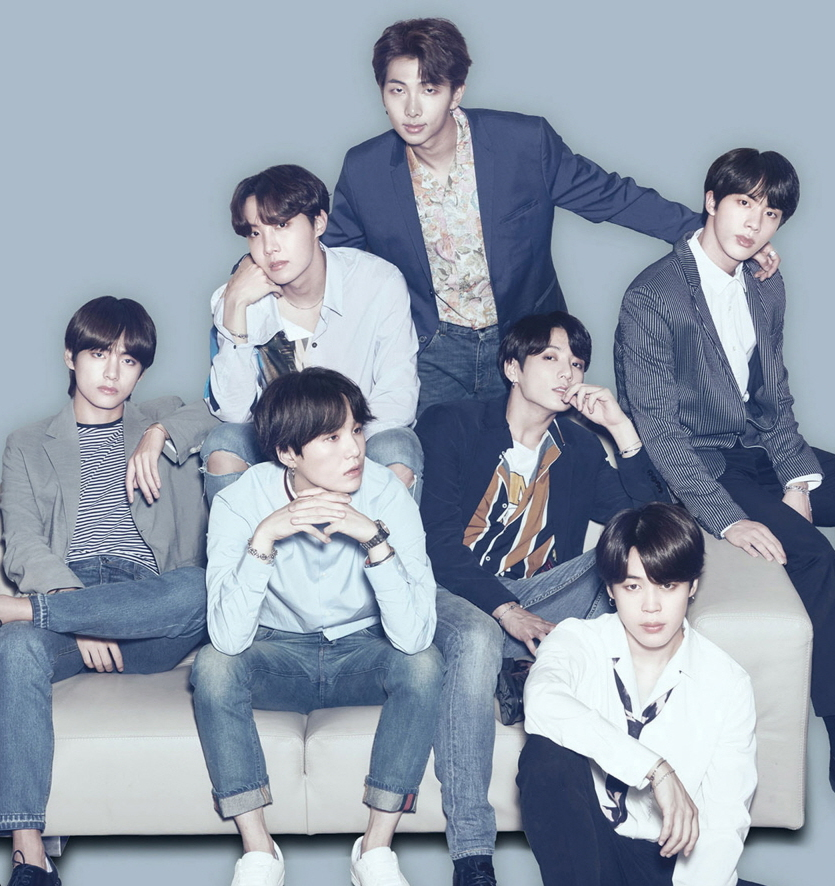
J-Hope is one of the primary songwriters for the boy band of which he is a member, BTS.

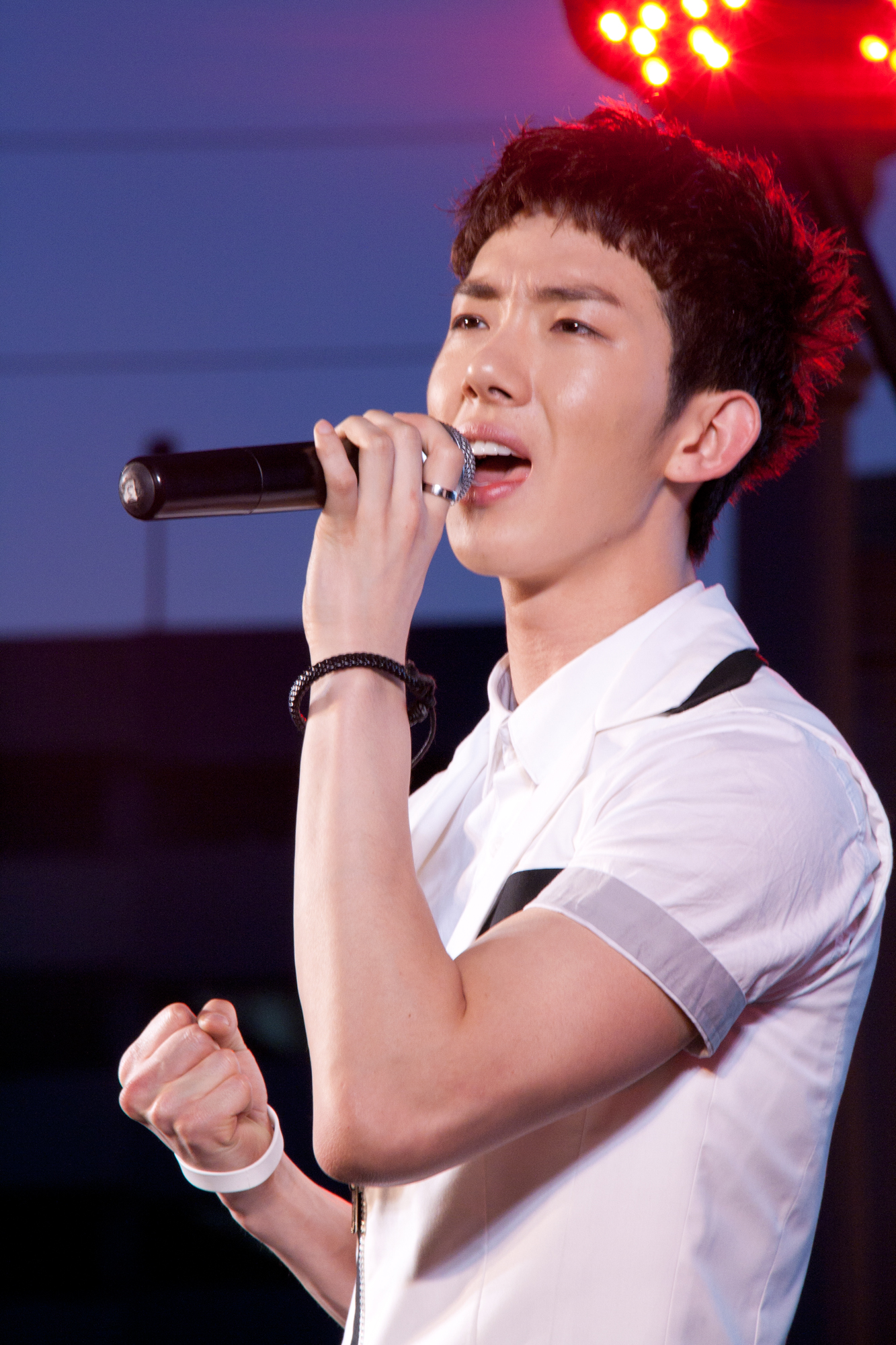
J-Hope helped to write Jo Kwon's song "Animal", which also featured him.

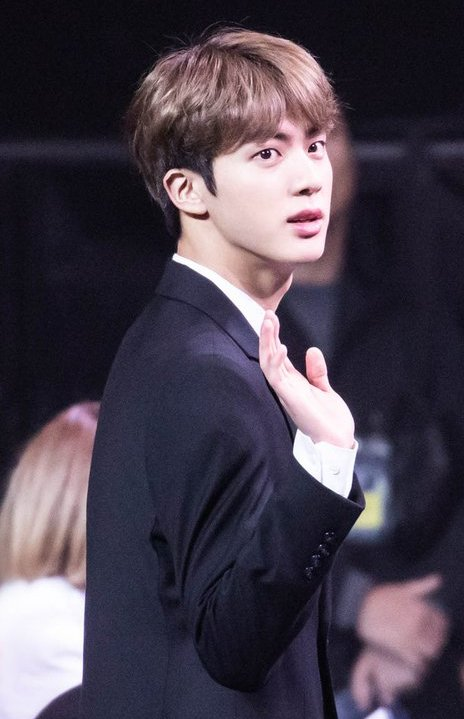
J-Hope was a co-writer on fellow BTS member Jin's 2016 track "Awake".

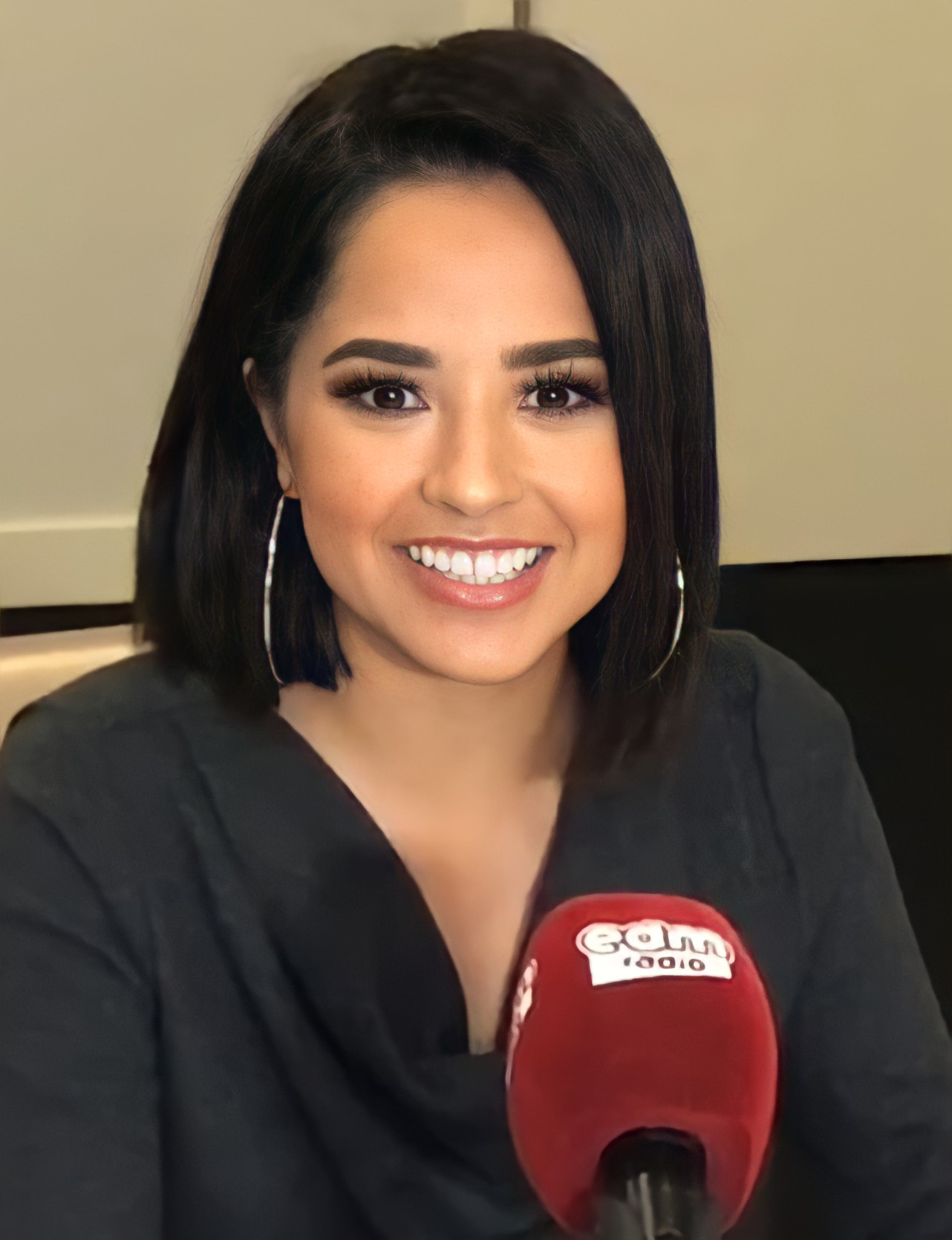
American singer Becky G featured on J-Hope's 2019 single "Chicken Noodle Soup" and helped write the track.

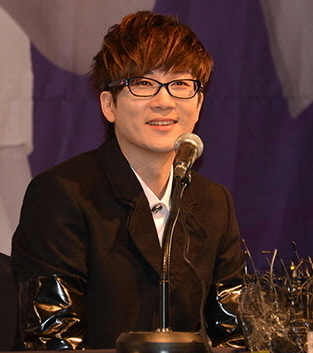
J-Hope participated in a rework of the "Come Back Home", originally written by Seo Taiji (pictured) and his band Seo Taiji and Boys, for the Seo Taiji 25th Anniversary event.

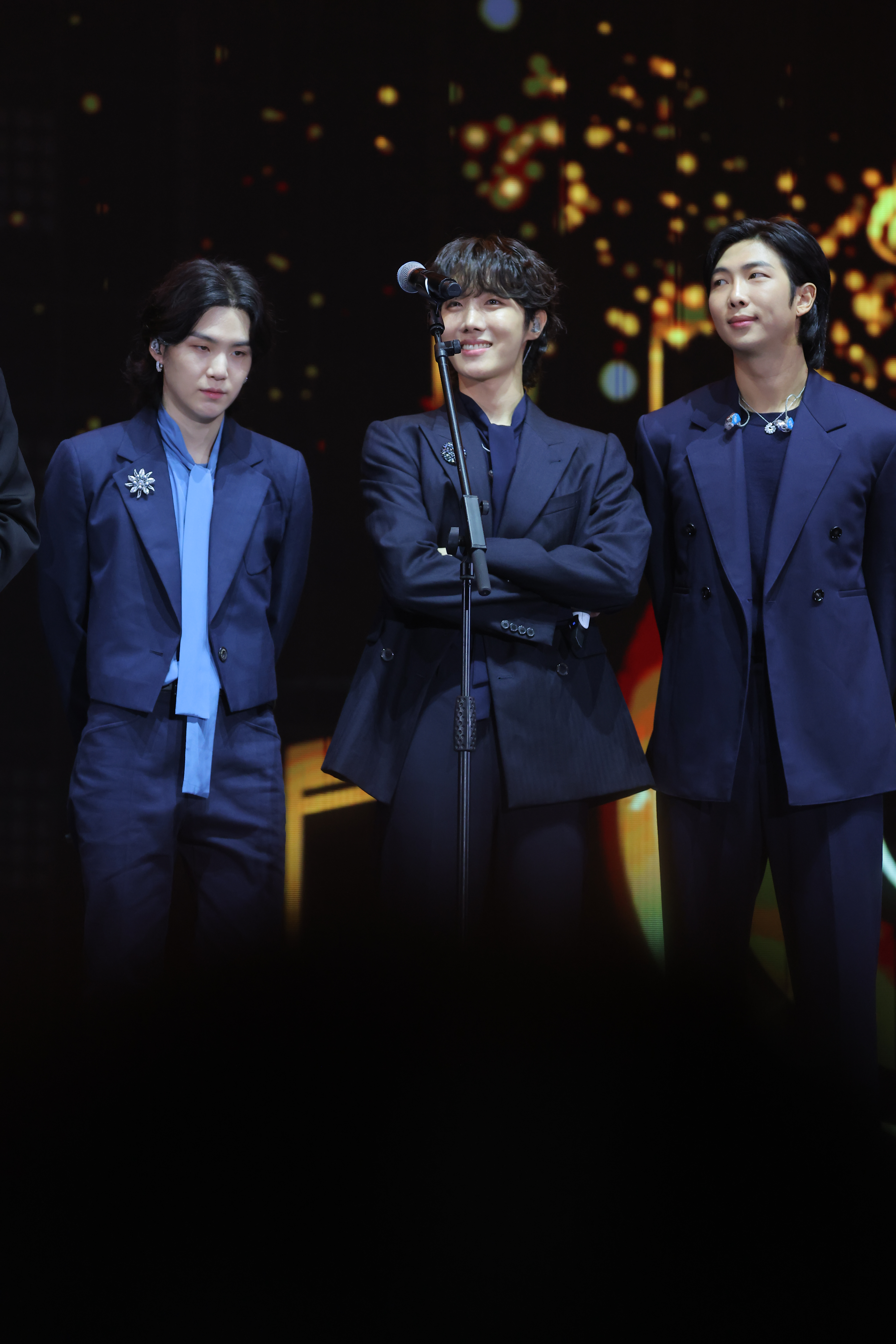
J-Hope collaborated with RM (right) and Suga (left), the other rappers in BTS, to release the track "Ddaeng", performed by the three of them.

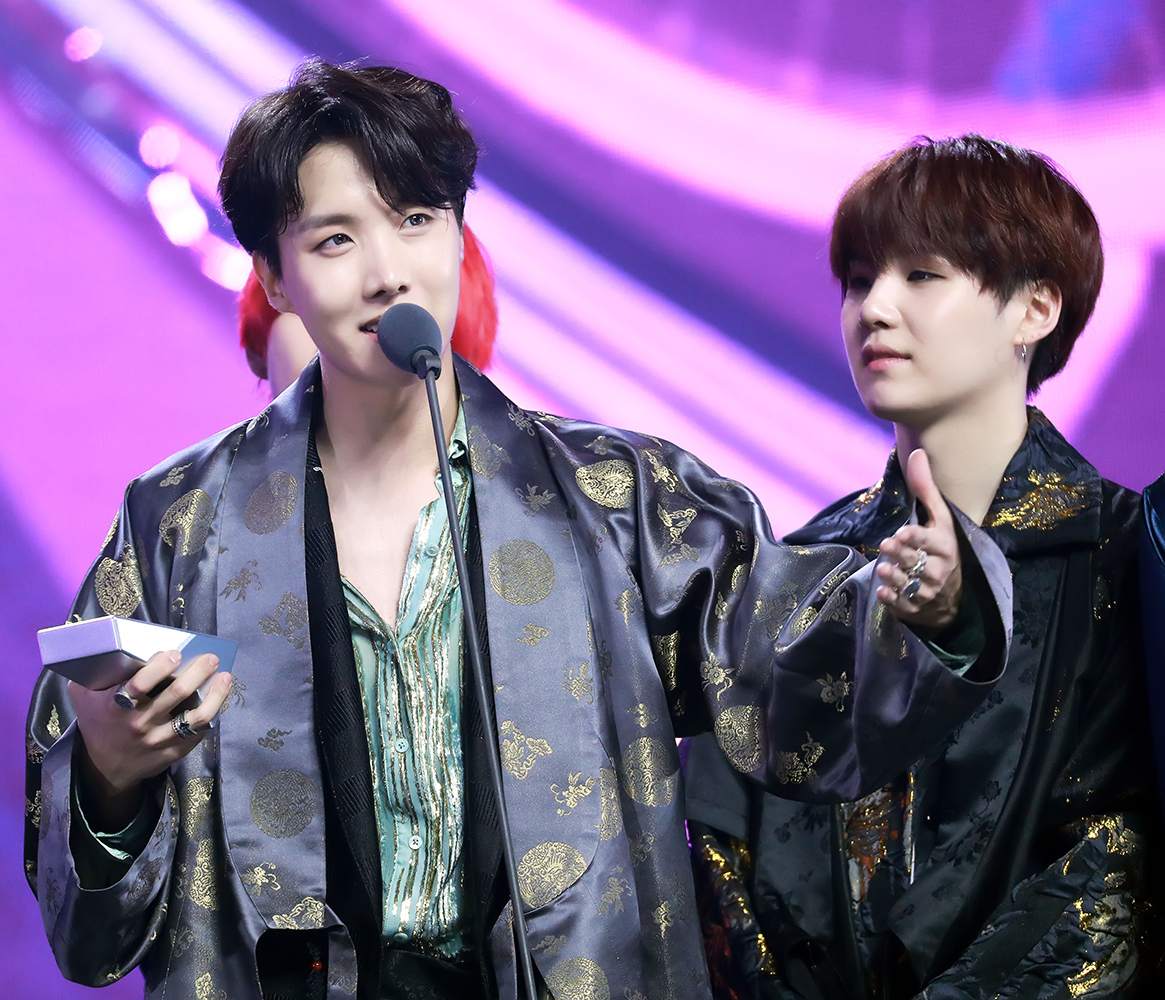
Sope, a duo formed by J-Hope and fellow BTS rapper Suga, have released one song together.

Song title, original artist, album of release, and year of release
Song	Artist(s)	Writer(s)	Album	Year	Ref.
"=" (Equal Sign)	J-Hope	J-Hope, Scoop DeVille, Melanie Joy Fontana, Michel "Lindgren" Schulz	Jack in the Box	2022	
"1 Verse" (Note: the track samples "El Chapo" by The Game and Skrillex) ‡ #	J-Hope	J-Hope	Non-album single	2015	
"134340"	BTS	J-Hope, Suga, RM, Pdogg, Adora, Bobby Chung, Martin Luke Brown, Orla Gartland	Love Yourself: Tear	2018	
"24/7=Heaven"	BTS	J-Hope, Suga, Pdogg, Slow Rabbit, Rap Monster	Dark & Wild	2014	
"2nd Grade" (2학년)	BTS	J-Hope, Supreme Boi, Rap Monster, Suga, Pdogg	Dark & Wild	2014	
"A Brand New Day" †	BTS feat. Zara Larsson	J-Hope, Zara Larsson, Yoo Gi-ta, Mura Masa, Max Wolfgang, Scott Quin	BTS World: Original Soundtrack	2019	
"A Supplementary Story: You Never Walk Alone"	BTS	J-Hope, Pdogg, "Hitman" Bang, RM, Suga, Supreme Boi	You Never Walk Alone	2017	
"Airplane" †	J-Hope	J-Hope, Supreme Boi	Hope World	2018	
"Airplane Pt. 2" †	BTS	J-Hope, Pdogg, RM, Ali Tamposi, Liza Owens, Roman Campolo, "Hitman" Bang, Suga	Love Yourself: Tear	2018	
"Animal" (Radio Edit)	Jo Kwon feat. J-Hope of BTS	J-Hope, Avicii, Lauren Dyson, "Hitman" Bang, Pdogg, Kim Tae-yoon	I'm Da One	2012	
"Answer: Love Myself"	BTS	J-Hope, Pdogg, Bobby Chung, DJ Swivel, Candace Nicole Sosa, RM, Suga, Ray Michael Djan, Ashton Foster, Conor Maynard	Love Yourself: Answer	2018	
"Arson" (방화)	J-Hope	J-Hope, Michael Volpe	Jack in the Box	2022	
"Attack on Bangtan" (진격의 방탄)	BTS	J-Hope, Pdogg, Rap Monster, Suga, Supreme Boi	O!RUL8,2?	2013	
"Attack on Bangtan" (Japanese Version) (進撃の防弾)	BTS	J-Hope, Pdogg, Rap Monster, Suga, Supreme Boi, KM-MARKIT	Wake Up	2014	
"Awake"	Jin (Note: although credited to BTS, the song is a solo track by the listed BTS member)	J-Hope, Slow Rabbit, Jin, June, Pdogg, Rap Monster, "Hitman" Bang	Wings	2016	
"Base Line"	J-Hope	J-Hope, Supreme Boi	Hope World	2018	
"Best of Me"	BTS	J-Hope, "Hitman" Bang, RM, (Note: RM changed his name from "Rap Monster" to "RM" in 2017. This was one of his first works to be credited under the new name.) Suga, Pdogg, Andrew Taggart, Ray Michael Djan Jr., Ashton Foster, Adora, Sam Klempner	Love Yourself: Her	2017	
"Best of Me" (Japanese Version)	BTS	J-Hope, "Hitman" Bang, RM, Suga, Pdogg, Andrew Taggart, Ray Michael Djan Jr., Ashton Foster, Adora, Sam Klempner, KM-MARKIT	Face Yourself	2018	
"Blanket Kick" (이불킥)	BTS	J-Hope, "Hitman" Bang, Shaun, Slow Rabbit, Pdogg, Rap Monster, Suga	Dark & Wild	2014	
"Blood Sweat & Tears" † (피땀눈물)	BTS	J-Hope, Pdogg, Rap Monster, Suga, "Hitman" Bang, Kim Do-hoon	Wings	2016	
"Blood Sweat & Tears" (Japanese Version) † (血、汗、涙)	BTS	J-Hope, Pdogg, RM, Suga, "Hitman" Bang, Kim Do-hoon, KM-MARKIT	Face Yourself	2017	
"Blue Side" (Outro)	J-Hope	J-Hope, Adora, Hiss Noise	Hope World	2018	
"Born Singer" (Note: samples "Born Sinner" from J. Cole's 2013 album of the same name)	BTS	J-Hope, J. Cole, James Fauntleroy II, Anthony Parrino, Canei Finch, Juro "Mez" Davis, Ibrahim Hamad, RM, Suga	Proof	2022	
"Boy with Luv" † (작은 것들을 위한 시)	BTS feat. Halsey	J-Hope, Pdogg, RM, Melanie Joy Fontana, Michel "Lindgren" Schulz, "Hitman" Bang, Suga, Emily Weisband, Halsey	Map of the Soul: Persona	2019	
"Boyz with Fun" (흥탄소년단)	BTS	J-Hope, Suga, Pdogg, "Hitman" Bang, Rap Monster, Jin, Jimin, V	The Most Beautiful Moment in Life, Pt. 1	2015	
"Boyz with Fun" (フンタン少年団)	BTS	J-Hope, Suga, Pdogg, "Hitman" Bang, Rap Monster, Jin, Jimin, V, KM-MARKIT	Youth	2016	
"BTS Cypher Pt. 1"	BTS	J-Hope, Supreme Boi, Rap Monster, Suga	O!RUL8,2?	2013	
"BTS Cypher Pt. 2: Triptych"	BTS	J-Hope, Rap Monster, Suga, Supreme Boi	Skool Luv Affair	2014	
"BTS Cypher Pt. 3: Killer"	BTS feat. Supreme Boi	J-Hope, Rap Monster, Suga, Supreme Boi	Dark & Wild	2014	
"BTS Cypher Pt. 4"	BTS	J-Hope, Rap Monster, Suga, Chris 'Tricky' Stewart, Medor J. Pierre	Wings	2016	
"Butterfly"	BTS	J-Hope, Rap Monster, Suga, "Hitman" Bang, Slow Rabbit, Pdogg, Brother Su	The Most Beautiful Moment in Life, Pt. 2	2015	
"Butterfly" (Alternative Mix)	BTS	J-Hope, Rap Monster, Suga, "Hitman" Bang, Slow Rabbit, Pdogg, Brother Su	The Most Beautiful Moment in Life: Young Forever	2016	
"Butterfly" (Japanese Version)	BTS	J-Hope, "Hitman" Bang, Slow Rabbit, Pdogg, Brother Su, Rap Monster, Suga, KM-MARKIT	Youth	2016	
"Can You Turn Off Your Phone" (핸드폰 좀 꺼줄래)	BTS	J-Hope, Pdogg, Rap Monster, Suga	Dark & Wild	2014	
"Chicken Noodle Soup" † (Note: the track samples "Chicken Noodle Soup" by Webstar and Young B featuring The Voice of Harlem)	J-Hope feat. Becky G	J-Hope, Becky G, Biana Dupree, Supreme Boi, Adora, Pdogg, Jinbo, Jamal Christopher Reynolds, Juan M. Frias, Ryan Desmond	Non-album single	2019	
"Coffee"	BTS	J-Hope, Urban Zakapa, Pdogg, Rap Monster, Slow Rabbit, Suga	O!RUL8,2?	2013	
"Come Back Home" † (Note: remake of the original song by Seo Taiji and Boys, released as part of the Seo Taiji 25th Anniversary event)	BTS	J-Hope, Seo Taiji, Rap Monster, Supreme Boi	Non-album single	2017	
"Danger" †	BTS	J-Hope, Pdogg, "Hitman" Bang, Rap Monster, Suga, Thanh Bui	Dark & Wild	2014	
"Danger" (Japanese Version) †	BTS	J-Hope, Pdogg, "Hitman" Bang, Rap Monster, Suga, Thanh Bui, KM-MARKIT	Wake Up	2014	
"Daydream" † (백일몽)	J-Hope	J-Hope, Pdogg	Hope World	2018	
"Ddaeng" # (땡)	J-Hope, RM, Suga,	J-Hope, RM, Suga, Jang Yi-jeong	Non-album single	2018	
"Dead Leaves" (고엽)	BTS	J-Hope, Suga, Slow Rabbit, Jungkook, "Hitman" Bang, Rap Monster, Pdogg	The Most Beautiful Moment in Life, Pt. 2	2015	
"Dionysus"	BTS	J-Hope, Pdogg, Supreme Boi, RM, Suga, Roman Campolo	Map of the Soul: Persona	2019	
"Dope" † (쩔어)	BTS	J-Hope, Rap Monster, Suga, Pdogg, Gwis Bang Mang, "Hitman" Bang	The Most Beautiful Moment in Life, Pt. 1	2015	
"Dope" (Japanese Version) (超ヤベー)	BTS	J-Hope, Rap Monster, Suga, Pdogg, Gwis Bang Mang, "Hitman" Bang, KM-MARKIT	Youth	2016	
"Epilogue: Young Forever" †	BTS	J-Hope, Slow Rabbit, Rap Monster, "Hitman" Bang, Suga	The Most Beautiful Moment in Life: Young Forever	2016	
"Epilogue: Young Forever" (Japanese Version)	BTS	J-Hope, Slow Rabbit, Rap Monster, "Hitman" Bang, Suga, KM-MARKIT	Youth	2016	
"For You" †	BTS	J-Hope, Uta, Hiro, Rap Monster, Suga, Pdogg, KM-MARKIT	Youth	2016	
"For Youth"	BTS	J-Hope, RM, Imad Royal, Rogét Chahayed, Balise Railey, Drew Love, 4rest, Suga, Hiss Noise, Slow Rabbit, "Hitman" Bang	Proof	2015	
"Future"	J-Hope	J-Hope, Rosenberg, Mich Cornwell	Jack in the Box	2022	
"Good Day"	BTS	J-Hope, Matt Cab, Ryuja, Suga, KM-MARKIT	Youth	2016	
"Hangsang" (항상)	J-Hope feat. Supreme Boi	J-Hope, Supreme Boi	Hope World	2018	
"Hip Hop Lover" (힙합성애자)	BTS	J-Hope, Pdogg, Rap Monster, Suga	Dark & Wild	2014	
"Hold Me Tight" (잡아줘)	BTS	J-Hope, Slow Rabbit, Pdogg, V, Rap Monster, Suga	The Most Beautiful Moment in Life, Pt. 1	2015	
"Home"	BTS	J-Hope, Pdogg, RM, Lauren Dyson, Tushar Apte, Suga, Krysta Youngs, Julia Ross, Bobby Chung, Song Jae-kyung, Adora	Map of the Soul: Persona	2019	
"Hope World"	J-Hope	J-Hope, Docskim	Hope World	2018	
"Huh?!"	Agust D feat. J-Hope	J-Hope, Agust D, El Capitxn	D-Day	2023	
"I Don't Know"	J-Hope with Huh Yunjin	J-Hope, Su Jin Moon, Pdogg	Hope on the Street Vol. 1	2024	
"I Like It" (좋아요)	BTS	J-Hope, Rap Monster, Suga, Slow Rabbit	2 Cool 4 Skool	2013	
"I Like It!" (いいね!)	BTS	J-Hope, Slow Rabbit, Rap Monster, Suga, KM-MARKIT	Wake Up	2014	
"I Like It" (Slow Jam Remix) (좋아요)	BTS	J-Hope, Brother Su, Pdogg, Slow Rabbit, Rap Monster, Suga	Skool Luv Affair: Special Addition	2014	
"I Like It! Pt.2 ~In That Place~" (いいね！Pt.2～あの場所で～)	BTS	J-Hope, Slow Rabbit, Pdogg, Rap Monster, Suga, KM-MARKIT	Wake Up	2014	
"I Need U" †	BTS	J-Hope, Pdogg, "Hitman" Bang, Rap Monster, Suga, Brother Su	The Most Beautiful Moment in Life, Pt. 1	2015	
"I Need U" (Japanese ver.) †	BTS	J-Hope, Pdogg, "Hitman" Bang, Rap Monster, Suga, Brother Su, KM-MARKIT	Youth	2015	
"I Wonder"	J-Hope with Jungkook	J-Hope, Pdogg, Melanie Fontana, Lindgren,	Hope On the Street Vol. 1	2024	
"I'm Fine"	BTS	J-Hope, RM, Suga, Ray Michael Djan, Lauren Dyson, Ashton Foster, Samantha Harper, Bobby Chung, Yoon Guitar, DJ Swivel, Candace Nicole Sosa, Pdogg	Love Yourself: Answer	2018	
"Interlude: Wings"	BTS	J-Hope, Suga, Pdogg, Adora, Rap Monster	Wings	2016	
"Intro: Boy Meets Evil"	J-Hope	J-Hope, Pdogg, Rap Monster	Wings	2016	
"Intro: Ringwanderung"	BTS	J-Hope, "Hitman" Bang, Adora, Pdogg, Ray Michael Djan Jr., RM, Suga, Uta, Ashton Foster, Andrew Taggart, Sam Klempner	Face Yourself	2018	
"Intro: Skool Luv Affair"	BTS	J-Hope, Pdogg, Slow Rabbit, Rap Monster, Suga	Skool Luv Affair	2014	
"Introduction: Youth"	BTS	J-Hope, Ryuja, Rap Monster, "Hitman" Bang, Pdogg, Suga, V, Jungkook, Uta, Hiro, Brother Su, Devine Channel	Youth	2016	
"Jamais Vu"	BTS	J-Hope, Marcus McCoan, Owen Roberts, Marcus McCoan, Max Lynedoch Graham, James F. Reynolds, RM, "Hitman" Bang	Map of the Soul: Persona	2019	
"Jump"	BTS	J-Hope, Suga, Pdogg, Supreme Boi, Rap Monster	Skool Luv Affair	2014	
"Jump" (Japanese Version)	BTS	J-Hope, Suga, Pdogg, Supreme Boi, Rap Monster, KM-MARKIT	Wake Up	2014	
"Just One Day" † (하루만)	BTS	J-Hope, Suga, Pdogg, Supreme Boi, Rap Monster	Skool Luv Affair	2014	
"Just One Day" (Japanese Version Extended)	BTS	J-Hope, Suga, Pdogg, Supreme Boi, Rap Monster, KM-MARKIT	Wake Up	2014	
"Let Me Know"	BTS	J-Hope, Pdogg, Rap Monster, Suga	Dark & Wild	2014	
"Lock / Unlock"	J-Hope with Benny Blanco and Nile Rodgers	J-Hope, Pdogg, Omer Fedi, Benny Blanco, Blake Slatkin, Nile Rodgers, John Michael Cleveland, Cat Cashmere	Hope On the Street Vol. 1	2024	
"Look Here" (여기 봐)	BTS	J-Hope, Lee Ho-hyoung, Jinbo, Rap Monster, Suga	Dark & Wild	2014	
"Louder than Bombs"	BTS	RM, Suga, J-Hope, Troye Sivan, Allie X, Leland, Bram Inscore	Map of the Soul: 7	2020	
"Love Maze"	BTS	J-Hope, Pdogg, DJ Swivel, Candace Nicole Sosa, RM, Suga, Bobby Chung, Adora, Yoon Kita	Love Yourself: Tear	2018	
"LV Bag" †	Don Toliver feat. J-Hope and Pharrell	J-Hope, Pharrell Williams, Caleb Toliver	Non-album single	2025	
"Ma City"	BTS	J-Hope, Pdogg, "Hitman" Bang, Rap Monster, Suga	The Most Beautiful Moment in Life, Pt. 2	2015	
"Magic Shop"	BTS	J-Hope, Jungkook, Hiss Noise, RM, DJ Swivel, Candace Nicole Sosa, Adora, Suga	Love Yourself: Tear	2018	
"Make It Right"	BTS	J-Hope, RM, Suga, Fred Gibson, Ed Sheeran, Benjy Gibson, Jo Hill	Map of the Soul: Persona	2019	
"Mama"	J-Hope	J-Hope, Primary, Pdogg	Wings	2016	
"Mic Drop"	BTS	J-Hope, "Hitman" Bang, Supreme Boi, RM, Pdogg	Love Yourself: Tear	2017	
"Mic Drop" (Japanese Version) †	BTS	J-Hope, "Hitman" Bang, Supreme Boi, RM, Pdogg, KM-MARKIT	Face Yourself	2018	
"Mic Drop" (Steve Aoki Remix) †	BTS feat. Desiigner	J-Hope, Steve Aoki, "Hitman" Bang, Supreme Boi, RM, Pdogg, Desiigner	Non-album single	2017	
"Mic Drop" (Steve Aoki Remix) [Full Length Edition]	BTS	J-Hope, Steve Aoki, "Hitman" Bang, Supreme Boi, RM, Pdogg	Love Yourself: Answer	2018	
"Mikrokosmos" (소우주)	BTS	J-Hope, Matty Thomson, Max Lynedoch Graham, Marcus McCoan, RM, Suga, DJ Swivel, Candace Nicole Sosa, Melanie Joy Fontana, Michel "Lindgren" Schulz	Map of the Soul: Persona	2019	
"Miss Right"	BTS	J-Hope, Pdogg, Slow Rabbit, "Hitman" Bang, Rap Monster, Suga	Skool Luv Affair: Special Addition	2014	
"Mona Lisa" †	J-Hope	J-Hope, Pdogg, Marcus Durand Lomax, Blake Slatkin, Magnus Høiberg, Nija Charles, Siddiqui Zain	Non-album single	2025	
"More" †	J-Hope	J-Hope, Ivan Jackson Rosenberg	Jack in the Box	2022	
"Moving On" (이사)	BTS	J-Hope, Pdogg, Rap Monster, Suga	The Most Beautiful Moment in Life, Pt. 1	2015	
"My Universe" †	Coldplay x BTS	J-Hope, RM, Suga, Oscar Holter, Guy Berryman, Jonny Buckland, Will Champion, Chris Martin, Max Martin, Bill Rhako	Music of the Spheres	2021	
"Neuron" †	J-Hope with Gaeko and Yoon Mi-rae	J-Hope, Gaeko, Yoon Mi-rae, Pdogg	Hope On the Street Vol. 1	2024	
"No More Dream" †	BTS	J-Hope, Pdogg, "Hitman" Bang, Rap Monster, Suga	2 Cool 4 Skool	2013	
"No More Dream" (Japanese Version) †	BTS	J-Hope, Pdogg, "Hitman" Bang, Rap Monster, Suga, KM-MARKIT	Wake Up	2014	
"On" †	BTS	J-Hope, RM, Suga, Pdogg, Antonina Armato, Melanie Joy Fontana, August Rigo, Michel "Lindgren" Schulz, Krysta Youngs, Julia Ross	Map of the Soul: 7	2020	
"On"	BTS feat. Sia	J-Hope, RM, Suga, Pdogg, Antonina Armato, Melanie Joy Fontana, August Rigo, Michel "Lindgren" Schulz, Krysta Youngs, Julia Ross	Map of the Soul: 7	2020	
"On the Street"	J-Hope and J. Cole	J-Hope, J. Cole, Pdogg	Non-album single	2023	
"On the Street" (Solo version)	J-Hope	J-Hope, Pdogg	Hope On the Street Vol. 1	2024	
"Otsukare" (お疲れ) #	Sope (Note: though officially credited to BTS, the song is by the duo Sope, made up of J-Hope and fellow BTS rapper Suga)	J-Hope, Shōko Fujibayashi	Non-album single	2016	
"Outro: Ego"	J-Hope	J-Hope, Hiss Noise, Supreme Boi	Map of the Soul: 7	2020	
"Outro: Her"	BTS	J-Hope, Suga, Slow Rabbit, RM	Love Yourself: Her	2017	
"Outro: Tear"	BTS	J-Hope, Suga, RM, Shin Myung-soo, Docskim	Love Yourself: Tear	2018	
"Outro: Wings"	BTS	J-Hope, Pdogg, Adora, RM, Suga	You Never Walk Alone	2017	
"P.O.P (Piece of Peace) Pt. 1"	J-Hope	J-Hope, Pdogg	Hope World	2018	
"Pandora's Box"	J-Hope	J-Hope, Ghstloop, Supreme Boi	Jack in the Box	2022	
"Paradise" (낙원)	BTS	J-Hope, Lophiile, MNEK, RM, Song Jae-kyung, Suga	Love Yourself: Tear	2018	
"Pied Piper"	BTS	J-Hope, Jinbo, "Hitman" Bang, RM, Suga, Pdogg, Kass	Love Yourself: Her	2017	
"Rain"	BTS	J-Hope, Slow Rabbit, Rap Monster, Suga	Dark & Wild	2014	
"Run" †	BTS	J-Hope, Pdogg, "Hitman" Bang, Rap Monster, Suga, Jungkook, V	The Most Beautiful Moment in Life, Pt. 2	2015	
"Run" (Alternative Mix)	BTS	J-Hope, Pdogg, "Hitman" Bang, Rap Monster, Suga, Jungkook, V	The Most Beautiful Moment in Life: Young Forever	2016	
"Run" (Japanese Version) †	BTS	J-Hope, Pdogg, "Hitman" Bang, Rap Monster, Suga, V, Jungkook, KM-MARKIT	Youth	2016	
"Run BTS" (달려라 방탄)	BTS	J-Hope, Dwayne Abernathy Jr., RM, Ebenezer, Ghstloop, Jungkook, Suga, Oneye (Pontus Kalm), Daniel Caesar, Ludwig Lindell, Fontana, Schulz, Feli Ferraro	Proof	2015	
"Rush Hour" †	Crush feat. J-Hope	J-Hope, Crush, Penomeco	Non-album single	2022	
"Safety Zone"	J-Hope	J-Hope, Pdogg	Jack in the Box	2022	
"Satoori Rap" (팔도강산)	BTS	J-Hope, Pdogg, Rap Monster, Suga	O!RUL8,2?	2013	
"Save Me" †	BTS	J-Hope, Pdogg, Ray Michael Djan Jr., Ashton Foster, Samantha Harper, Rap Monster, Suga	The Most Beautiful Moment in Life: Young Forever	2016	
"Save Me" (Japanese Version)	BTS	J-Hope, Pdogg, Ray Michael Djan Jr., Ashton Foster, Samantha Harper, Rap Monster, Suga, KM-MARKIT	Youth	2016	
"Sea" (바다)	BTS	J-Hope, RM, Slow Rabbit, Suga	Love Yourself: Her	2017	
"So What"	BTS	J-Hope, Pdogg, "Hitman" Bang, Adora, RM, Suga	Love Yourself: Tear	2018	
"Spaghetti"	Le Sserafim feat J-Hope	J-Hope, Score (13), Megatone (13), Anika Bennett, Elle Campbell, JBach, Federico Vindver, Gian Stone, Huh Yunjin, Phil Leigh, Alex Jonathan Crofton Ball, Matt Holmes, Tobias Wincorn, "Hitman" Bang, Sakura, Park Woo-hyun	Spaghetti	2025	
"Stop" (세상에 나쁜 사람은 없다)	J-Hope	J-Hope, Michael Volpe	Jack in the Box	2022	
"The Stars"	BTS	J-Hope, Rap Monster, Suga, Pdogg, KM-MARKIT	Wake Up	2014	
"Sweet Dreams" †	J-Hope feat. Miguel	J-Hope, Sean Maxwell Douglas, Theron Makiel Thomas, Samuel Dension Martin, Johnny Goldstein	Non-album single	2025	
"Take Two"†	BTS	J-Hope, Suga, El Capitxn, RM, Gabriel Brandes, Matt Thomson, Max Lynedoch Graham, Nois Upgrader	Non-album single	2023	
"Tomorrow"	BTS	J-Hope, Suga, Slow Rabbit, Rap Monster	Skool Luv Affair	2014	
"Trivia: Just Dance"	J-Hope	J-Hope, Hiss Noise	Love Yourself: Answer	2018	
"Two! Three! (Still Wishing for Better Days)" (둘! 셋! [그래도 좋은 날이 더 많기를)	BTS	J-Hope, Slow Rabbit, Pdogg, "Hitman" Bang, Rap Monster, Suga	Wings	2016	
"Ugh" (욱)	BTS	J-Hope, Suga, RM, Supreme Boi, Hiss Noise, Icecream Drum	Map of the Soul: 7	2020	
"Wake Up"	BTS	J-Hope, Rap Monster, Suga, Swing-O, KM-MARKIT	Wake Up	2014	
"War of Hormone" † (호르몬 전쟁)	BTS	J-Hope, Pdogg, Supreme Boi, Rap Monster, Suga	Dark & Wild	2014	
"We are Bulletproof: The Eternal"	BTS	J-Hope, Suga, RM, DJ Swivel, Audien, Sunshine, Etta Zelmani, Will Tanner, Gusten Dahlqvist, Candace Nicole Sosa, Elohim, Antonina Armato, Alexander Magnus Karlsson, Alexei Viktorovitch	Map of the Soul: 7	2020	
"We On"	BTS	J-Hope, Pdogg, Rap Monster, Suga	O!RUL8,2?	2013	
"Whalien 52"	BTS	J-Hope, Rap Monster, Suga, Pdogg, Brother Su, "Hitman" Bang, Slow Rabbit	The Most Beautiful Moment in Life, Pt. 2	2015	
"What If..." (Note: the track samples “Shimmy Shimmy Ya” by Ol' Dirty Bastard of the Wu-Tang Clan)	J-Hope	J-Hope, Dwayne Abernathy Jr., R. Jones, R. Diggs	Jack in the Box	2022	
"What If..." (Dance Mix)	J-Hope with Jinbo the Superfreak	J-Hope, Jinbo, Dwayne Allen Abernathy, Robert F. Diggs, Russell T. Jones	Hope on the Street Vol. 1	2024	
"Where Did You Come From" (어디에서 왔는지)	BTS	J-Hope, Rap Monster, Suga, Kwon Dae-hee, Kim Kyeong-mo, Slow Rabbit	Skool Luv Affair	2014	
"Wishing on a Star"	BTS	J-Hope, Rap Monster, Suga, Matt Cab, Willie Weeks, Daisuke, KM-MARKIT	Youth	2016	
"Yet to Come (The Most Beautiful Moment)" †	BTS	J-Hope, Pdogg, RM, Max, Dan Gleyzer, Suga	Proof	2023	
"Killin' It Girl"	J-Hope	J-Hope, GloRilla, Pdogg, Cirkut, Blake Slatkin, Jessica Agombar, Theron Thomas	Non-album single	2025	
"Merry Go Round"	BTS	J-Hope, Rap Monster, SUGA, Kevin Parker, Pdogg, Gregory Aldae Hein, Sarah Aarons, Sam Homaee, Derrick Milano, GHSTLOOP	Arirang	2026	
"Please"	BTS	J-Hope, RM, SUGA, Pdogg, Ryan Tedder, James Essien, Tyler Spry	Arirang	2026	
"they don't know 'bout us"	BTS	J-Hope, RM, SUGA, Jimin, Pdogg, GHSTLOOP, Kurtis Wells, Rug, Ari Starace	Arirang	2026	
