= Chicken noodle soup (disambiguation) =

Chicken noodle soup is a variant of chicken soup.

Chicken noodle soup may also refer to:

- "Chicken Noodle Soup" (Webstar and Young B song), 2006
- "Chicken Noodle Soup" (J-Hope song), 2019
