= Litefeet =

Type of dance

Litefeet, also referred to as "getting lite," is a type of street dance/vernacular dance that emerged from Harlem, New York in the early 2000s (was established in 2006) .

The term comes from dancers dancing as though they have "light feet," or are weightless.

The Harlem shake is commonly incorporated into the social dance Litefeet, as is the "Chicken Noodle Soup, the Tone Wop (often mistakenly named the "Toe Whop"), the Rev Up and the Aunt Jackie. Moves often include: shuffling, hat tricks, and shoe tricks.

Dancers often perform on subways in New York City, where the performances are called Showtime, and at Union Square. The dance has been embraced as a symbol of the urban musical social scene of Harlem.

Well-known teams include: W.A.F.F.L.E. (We Are Family For Life, Ent.), MonzterInc, Brotherhood, 2Real Boyz, Team Rocket, Demon, 2crafty, Loonatics, Outsiders, Live Zombies, LyveTyme, NewMem The Litefeet Collective and Bwreckfast Club E.A.T.

Litefeet is also the name of the music played along with the dance, often fast-paced 100-110BPM rap beats and drum kits. LiL LIVE, HANN, M-Lyve, Kid the Wiz, Dsparkz, Fliqht, TweekTune, BSNYEA, H Rockz, Faro, AG the Voice of Harlem, SGFLOW, Lil Sns, Aye Jae Beats, Coma, Lady MoSoFou, DJ Webstar, and Young B are some well-known Litefeet music producers.

== Popular Litefeet dances ==
- The Tone Wop
- The Chicken Noodle Soup
- The Rev Up
- The Bad One
- The All In
