= Almánzar =

Almánzar is a Spanish surname derived from the Arabic al-manẓar; meaning, "the lookout point" or "the watchtower." Notable people with the surname include:

- Belcalis Almanzar, American rapper better known as Cardi B
- Bethania Almánzar, beach volleyball player from the Dominican Republic
- Carlos Almanzar, baseball player and son of Michael Almanzar
- Hennessy Carolina Almánzar, American social media personality and sister of Cardi B
- Michael Almanzar, baseball player and father of Carlos Almanzar
- Charina Almanzar, mother of American rapper Ice Spice
