= The Challenge: Champs vs. Stars season 2 =

Champs vs Stars
- Season 2
- Presented by: Mike "The Miz" Mizanin
- No. of contestants: 20
- Winners: Chris "CT" Tamburello; Tony Raines
- No. of episodes: 11 (including the Reunion Special)

Release
- Original network: MTV
- Original release: April 17 – June 26, 2018

Season chronology
- ← Previous; Champs vs. Stars (2017)

The 2018 installment of The Challenge: Champs vs. Stars, a recurring special mini-series of MTV's The Challenge, premiered on April 17, 2018. The season features ten alumni from The Challenge who made it to a final on the show or on Road Rules competing with ten celebrities.

== Contestants ==
Player	Known From	Team	Charity	Raised	Finish
Chris "CT" Tamburello	The Real World: Paris	Champs	F.I.G.H.T.	$52,950	Winner
Tony Raines	Real World: Skeletons	Champs	Hands on NOLA	$57,700	Winner
Casper Smart	Dancer	Stars	Inner-City Arts	$30,700	Runner-up
Louise Hazel	Olympian (Note: Louise Hazel previously competed on the Champs vs Pros season.)	Stars	BLSYW	$30,200	Runner-up
Daniel Gibson	Former NBA guard	Stars	American Diabetes Association	$3,200	Third place
Wes Bergmann	The Real World: Austin	Champs	36 Degrees North	$3,200	Third place
Drake Bell	Actor and singer	Stars	Global Down Syndrome	$3,200	Episode 9/10
Kailah Casillas	Real World: Go Big or Go Home	Champs	4Kids of South Florida	$1,450	Episode 9/10
Lil Mama	Rapper	Stars	Man Up! Inc	$950	Episode 8
Tori Deal	Are You the One? 4	Champs	PanCAN	$950	Episode 8
Brooke Hogan	TV personality	Stars	PETA	$2,450	Episode 8
Shane Landrum	Road Rules: Campus Crawl	Champs	True Colors Fund	$2,950	Episode 8
Jozea Flores	Big Brother 18	Stars	JDRF	$950	Episode 7/8
Selita Ebanks	Model	Stars	New Yorkers for Children	$950	Episode 7/8
Ashley Mitchell	Real World: Ex-Plosion	Champs	Malala Fund	$3,200	Episode 6
Devin Walker-Molaghan	Are You the One? 3	Champs	Bregamos Community Theater	$950	Episode 5
Aneesa Ferreira	The Real World: Chicago	Champs	RAINN	$1,450	Episode 4 (Note: At the end of Episode 4, Aneesa was forced to withdraw from the competition, after she suffered a fractured ankle during the "Face Off" mission. As a result, no LVP nomination or female Arena was held.)
Hennessy Carolina	Social media personality	Stars	BronxWorks	$400	Episode 3 (Note: Prior to the third Arena, Hennessy withdrew from the competition, after she engaged in a verbal altercation with Devin.)
Kam Williams	Are You the One? 5	Champs	LUCY Outreach	$400	Episode 2
Arian Foster	NFL running back	Stars	Arian Foster Foundation	Unknown	Episode 1

The contestant is representing the Champs.
The contestant is representing the Stars.

=== Draft ===
The winners of the first challenge were made team captains that would divide the Champs and Stars into two separate teams. Tony and CT were the captains.

Round	Blue Team	Red Team
Captain	Tony	CT
1	Tori (Note: In episode 4, MVP Louise was given the Power Play "Trade", which meant that she could switch any member of the blue team for any member of the red team. She switched Tori for Ashley.)	Kailah
2	Wes	Shane
3	Kam	Ashley
4	Casper	Devin
5	Louise	Brooke
6	Daniel	Arian
7	Aneesa	Lil Mama
8	Drake	Jozea
9	Hennessy	Selita

In Episode 7, the remaining players were paired into teams of two. The leaders on the scoreboard got to choose their partners.

Round	Captain	Selection
1	Tony	CT
2	Daniel	Wes
3	Louise	Casper
4	Drake	Kailah
5	Brooke	Shane
6	Lil Mama	Tori
7	Selita	Jozea

== Game summary ==
=== Challenge games ===
- Stair Down: Challengers compete in two heats, half Champs and half Stars each heat. They are covered in lube and must make their way to the top of a flight of stairs. The winners of each heat become the team captains for drafting the mixed teams. Once drafted, the total combined time from each individual player determined which newly formed team with the fastest time was the winner.
  - Winners: Blue Team - MVP: Tony
- Over the Edge: Similar to shuffleboard, players must sit on top of a giant puck while another teammate pushes them to score points. Touching the ground while on the puck of going over the edge of the board disqualifies that player.
  - Winners: Red Team - MVP: Ashley
- Release the Rainbow: Competitors are connected to a piece of ribbon and must untangle themselves from a giant jungle gym. Players may assist other players on their teams as long as they don't lock their ribbon in its final position. The first team to have all their players untangle themselves and connected to their final puzzle wins.
  - Winners: Red Team - MVP: CT
- Face Off: Played on a football field in heats, players take turns on offense and defense. On offense, a player must kick a small ball past the 10-yard line while their teammates try to protect them, by blocking defenders with giant blown up balls. Similarly, the players on defense must stop the offensive player from bringing the small ball back into the endzone by knocking them over with the blown up balls.
  - Winners: Blue Team - MVP: Louise
- Jumbo Table Hockey: Contestants play a game of field hockey, however the area they can move around is limited to moving their hockey sticks which are connected to the table.
  - Winners: Blue Team - MVP: Daniel
- Crossfire: Players must divide their teams: half chosen to shoot dodgeballs using slingshots at giant stacks of boxes they must knock over, the other half hanging over the stack of boxes trying to defend them. When a player's stack of boxes is knocked over, they drop down to the ground and then may help retrieve balls for their teammates. The first team to have all the other team's boxes knocked over wins.
  - Winners: Blue Team - MVP: Drake
- Go Deep: Partners must dive into an Olympic swimming pool and take turns moving a ring along a series of pipes. The first team to figure out the puzzle and remove the ring from the pipes and return it outside of the pool wins.
  - Winners: Brooke & Shane - MVP: Shane
- Spot On: Similar to Twister, players must hold themselves between two walls with colored pegs. They must move their arms and legs to the corresponding colored peg that is called out. If players stop touching a peg, they are eliminated, and the last player remaining wins for their team, while the bottom 3 teams are on the chopping block.
  - Winners: Casper & Louise - MVP: Casper
- Text Tile: Similar in style to the "Die Hard" Gulag from Cutthroat, teams must move a large crate across a beach, where one player lifts and moves the crate, while the other balances on top of the crate. Once at a certain mark, players must then open up their crate to find letters for a puzzle. The first players to solve the "Millennial Crossword Puzzle" wins and earn a spot in the final challenge.
  - Winners: CT & Tony - MVP: Tony
- Bankroll: In the final challenge, the teams participate in four stations. After each station is complete, teams must collect a coin and deposit it to their "Miz Bank" before moving on to the next station.
  - Puck It: Teams must use shuffle sticks to push a tire off an elevated ramp while standing on a balance beam. If a player falls off the balance beam, the team must start over.
  - Blockhead: Teams must use a hoverboard to collect block puzzle pieces. Once all the pieces are collected, teams must then assemble a block wall puzzle with the faces of all the cast members.
  - Eat and Run: Teams must use star poles to move five balls into a bucket. After each ball is deposited, they may then select a food item. Once all balls are deposited in the bucket, the teams may then eat their selected food items.
  - Beat Box: Teams must unwrap, untie, and unchain several layers around a giant box to complete a slider puzzle inside.
    - Winners: CT & Tony (won $100,000)
    - Second Place: Casper & Louise (won $50,000)
    - Third Place: Daniel & Wes

=== Arena Games ===
- Screw Off: Contestants must use a baseball bat to hit a flat piece of metal connected to a giant screw. The first contestant to successfully completely unscrew their piece wins.
  - Played by: Arian vs. Casper
- Rock & Roll: Contestants start in the middle of a platform. Contestants must wrestle a large box with handles to their sides of the platform twice to defeat their opponent.
  - Played by: Brooke vs. Kam
- Throwing Shade: Similar to cornhole, contestants must smash boxes and use the objects found inside to throw at picture targets of their opponent's face. The first contestant to hit all of the targets wins.
  - Played by: Shane vs. Tony
- Popping Tags: Contestants are covered in large clothing tags and must wrestle their opponent to pull of three of their tags while defending their own tags.
  - Played by: Devin vs. Wes
- Free Your Mind: This puzzle elimination has contestants placed within a cylinder bodysuit with pipes jutting out of it, and then placed within a cage with which the pipes they are connected to intersect. Contestants must figure out how to maneuver their bodies in order to escape from the cage. The first one to do so wins.
  - Played by: Ashley vs. Kailah
- Flip Cup: Similar to the drinking game, players must flip over 3 cups face down before their partner must do the same. They then must flip over a giant flip cup with their partner inside, before switching with their partner and flipping the giant cup back to the start position.
  - Played by: Casper & Louise vs. Jozea & Selita
- Icy Hot: Contestants must work with their partners and jump to touch buttons one thousand times total. They then must use an ice pick to break open a block of ice, untangle frozen jerseys inside, put on the jerseys, and then jump and touch the buttons another thousand times.
  - Played by: Casper & Louise vs. Drake & Kailah

=== Elimination chart ===
Episode		Gender	Winners		Arena contestants		Arena game	Arena outcome	
#	Challenge	Gender	Team	MVP	MVP's Pick	Voted In	Arena game	Winner	Loser
1	Stair Down	Male	Blue Team	Tony	Casper	Arian	Screw Off	Casper	Arian
2	Over The Edge	Female	Red Team	Ashley	Brooke	Kam (Note: After a tie with the vote, the winner of the previous elimination, Casper, received the power to cast the deciding vote.)	Rock & Roll	Brooke	Kam
3	Release the Rainbow	Male	Red Team	CT	Shane	Tony	Throwing Shade	Tony	Shane (Note: After losing the elimination round, the Red Team voted to save Shane from being eliminated.)
4	Face Off	Female	Blue Team	Louise	—N/a				
5	Jumbo Table Hockey	Male	Blue Team	Daniel	Wes	Devin (Note: Devin was placed into the Arena in place of Jozea, who was originally voted in, by the Blue Team's MVP, Daniel, whose Power Play gave him the chance to switch out the players at the nomination ceremony.)	Popping Tags	Wes	Devin
6	Crossfire	Female	Blue Team	Drake	Ashley	Kailah (Note: After a tie with the vote, the winner of the previous elimination, Wes, received the power to cast the deciding vote. He chose Lil Mama.) (Note: Kailah was placed into the Arena in place of Lil Mama, who was originally voted in, by the Blue Team's MVP, Drake, whose Power Play gave him the chance to switch out the players at the elimination arena.)	Free Your Mind	Kailah	Ashley
7/8	Go Deep	—N/a	Brooke & Shane	Shane	Casper & Louise	Jozea & Selita (Note: After a tie with the vote, the winner of the previous elimination, Kailah, received the power to cast the deciding vote.)	Flip Cup	Casper & Louise	Jozea & Selita
8	Spot On	—N/a	Casper & Louise	Casper (Note: As the MVP, Casper received the Power Play, Eliminate, which granted him the choice of which two of the bottom three teams from the challenge to eliminate.)	—N/a				Brooke & Shane
8	Spot On	—N/a	Casper & Louise	Casper	—N/a				Lil Mama & Tori
9/10	Text Tile	—N/a	CT & Tony	Tony	Casper & Louise	Drake & Kailah	Icy Hot	Casper & Louise	Drake & Kailah
10	Bankroll	—N/a	CT & Tony		Second Place: Casper & Louise, Third Place: Daniel & Wes				

=== Episode progress ===
Contestants	Episodes									
Contestants	1	2	3	4	5	6	7/8	8	9/10	10
CT	SAFE	SAFE	WIN	SAFE	SAFE	SAFE	SAFE	SAFE	WON	WINNER
Tony	WIN	SAFE	ELIM	SAFE	SAFE	SAFE	SAFE	SAFE	WIN	WINNER
Casper	ELIM	SAFE	SAFE	SAFE	SAFE	SAFE	ELIM	WIN	ELIM	SECOND
Louise	SAFE	SAFE	SAFE	WIN	SAFE	SAFE	ELIM	WON	ELIM	SECOND
Daniel	SAFE	SAFE	SAFE	SAFE	WIN	SAFE	SAFE	SAFE	SAFE	THIRD
Wes	SAFE	SAFE	SAFE	SAFE	ELIM	SAFE	SAFE	SAFE	SAFE	THIRD
Drake	SAFE	SAFE	SAFE	SAFE	SAFE	WIN	SAFE	RISK	OUT	
Kailah	SAFE	SAFE	SAFE	SAFE	SAFE	ELIM	SAFE	RISK	OUT	
Lil Mama	SAFE	SAFE	SAFE	SAFE	SAFE	SAFE	SAFE	LAST		
Tori	SAFE	SAFE	SAFE	SAFE	SAFE	SAFE	SAFE	LAST		
Brooke	SAFE	ELIM	SAFE	SAFE	SAFE	SAFE	WON	LAST		
Shane	SAFE	SAFE	SAVE	SAFE	SAFE	SAFE	WIN	LAST		
Jozea	SAFE	SAFE	SAFE	SAFE	SAFE	SAFE	OUT			
Selita	SAFE	SAFE	SAFE	IMM	SAFE	SAFE	OUT			
Ashley	SAFE	WIN	SAFE	SAFE	SAFE	OUT				
Devin	SAFE	SAFE	SAFE	SAFE	OUT					
Aneesa	SAFE	SAFE	SAFE	MED						
Hennessy	SAFE	SAFE	QUIT	ARENA						
Kam	SAFE	OUT								
Arian	OUT									

Competition
The contestant won the final challenge.
The contestant did not win the final challenge.
The contestant won the challenge, was named "MVP" for their team, and was immune from the Arena.
The contestant won the challenge with their team, but was not "MVP", and was immune from the Arena.
The contestant won in the Arena.
The contestant had immunity for the week.
The contestant lost the challenge and was eligible for elimination by the MVP of that challenge, but was not chosen to be eliminated.
The contestant lost in the Arena, but their team voted to save them.
The contestant lost in the Arena and was eliminated.
The contestant lost the challenge and was eliminated by the MVP of that challenge.
The contestant was removed from the competition due to illness or injury.
The contestant withdrew from the competition.

=== Bank progress ===
Players	Episodes									
Players	1	2	3	4	5	6	7/8	8	9/10	10
CT	$0	$450	$1,950	$1,950	$1,950	$1,950	$1,950	$1,950	$2,950	$52,950
Tony	$1,400	$1,400	$1,900	$2,450	$3,050	$3,700	$3,700	$3,700	$7,700	$57,700
Casper	$900	$900	$900	$1,450	$2,050	$2,700	$2,700	$5,200	$5,700	$30,700
Louise	$400	$400	$400	$1,950	$2,550	$3,200	$3,200	$4,700	$5,200	$30,200
Daniel	$400	$400	$400	$950	$2,550	$3,200	$3,200	$3,200	$3,200	$3,200
Wes	$400	$400	$900	$1,450	$2,550	$3,200	$3,200	$3,200	$3,200	$3,200
Drake	$400	$400	$400	$950	$1,550	$3,200	$3,200	$3,200	$3,200	
Kailah	$0	$450	$950	$950	$950	$1,450	$1,450	$1,450	$1,450	
Lil Mama	$0	$450	$950	$950	$950	$950	$950	$950		
Tori	$400	$400	$400	$950	$950	$950	$950	$950		
Brooke	$0	$950	$1,450	$1,450	$1,450	$1,450	$2,450	$2,450		
Shane	$0	$450	$950	$950	$950	$950	$2,950	$2,950		
Jozea	$0	$450	$950	$950	$950	$950	$950			
Selita	$0	$450	$950	$950	$950	$950	$950			
Ashley	$0	$1,450	$1,950	$1,950	$2,550	$3,200				
Devin	$0	$450	$950	$950	$950					
Aneesa	$400	$400	$400	$1,450						
Hennessy	$400	$400	$400							
Kam	$400	$400								
Arian	$0									

Competition
The contestant won the final challenge.
The contestant did not win the final challenge.
The contestant won the challenge, was named "MVP" for their team, and was immune from the Arena.
The contestant won the challenge with their team, but was not "MVP", and was immune from the Arena.
The contestant won in the Arena.
The contestant had immunity for the week.
The contestant didn't win the challenge and was eligible for elimination by the MVP of that challenge, but was not chosen to be eliminated.
The contestant lost in the Arena, but their team voted to save them.
The contestant lost in the Arena and was eliminated.
The contestant didn't win the challenge and was eliminated by the MVP of that challenge.
The contestant was removed from the competition due to illness or injury.
The contestant withdrew from the competition.

=== Power Play ===
MVP	Power Play	Recipient
Tony	Protect (Protect any person on the opposing team from elimination.)	—N/a
Ashley	Bench (Bench one player from the opposing team at the next challenge.)	Wes
CT	Immunity (Grant immunity to any girl from the next girl's elimination.)	Selita
Louise	Trade (Trade any player on your team for a player on the opposing team.)	Tori
Louise	Trade (Trade any player on your team for a player on the opposing team.)	Ashley
Daniel	Switch (Switch the opposing team's LVP with any available player on their team.)	Jozea
Daniel	Switch (Switch the opposing team's LVP with any available player on their team.)	Devin
Drake	Override (Override any team's LVP decision and replace them with an available player on their team.)	Lil Mama
Drake	Override (Override any team's LVP decision and replace them with an available player on their team.)	Kailah
Shane	Advantage (Give any team a significant disadvantage in the next challenge.)	Casper & Louise
Casper	Eliminate (Eliminate two of the three bottom teams.)	Brooke & Shane
Casper	Eliminate (Eliminate two of the three bottom teams.)	Lil Mama & Tori
Tony	Sabotage (Give any team a 2-minute delay at the start of the final challenge.)	Casper & Louise

== Episodes ==
No. overall	No. in season	Title	Original release date	US viewers (millions)
15	1	"Staring Down the Competition"	April 17, 2018	0.56
16	2	"Over the Edge and Under a Bus"	April 24, 2018	0.49
17	3	"From Rainbows to Storm Clouds"	May 1, 2018	0.62
18	4	"Face Off, Gloves On"	May 8, 2018	0.52
19	5	"Fire in the Heart, Ice in the Veins"	May 15, 2018	0.50
20	6	"Champs Caught in Cross Fire"	May 22, 2018	0.56
21	7	"Go Deep, or Go Home"	May 29, 2018	0.62
22	8	"When Loyalty Is Spot On"	June 5, 2018	0.49
23	9	"Crossed Words and Mixed Signals"	June 12, 2018	0.52
24	10	"Bank Rolling in the Deep"	June 19, 2018	0.53

=== Reunion Special ===
The reunion special aired on June 26, 2018, and was hosted by WWE pro wrestler, The Real World: Back to New York alum, and Challenge champion Mike "The Miz" Mizanin. Most of the cast members attended at the MTV Studios in New York. Missing from the reunion were Hennessy Carolina and Arian Foster. Drake Bell made his appearance via video chat.
