= The Challenge: Champs vs. Stars season 1 =

Season of television series

Champs vs Stars
- Season 1
- Presented by: Mike "The Miz" Mizanin
- No. of contestants: 21
- Winners: Chris "CT" Tamburello; Emily Schromm; Johnny "Bananas" Devenanzio
- No. of episodes: 8

Release
- Original network: MTV
- Original release: November 21, 2017 – January 9, 2018

Season chronology
- ← Previous; Champs vs. Pros Next → Champs vs. Stars (2018)

The 2017 season of The Challenge: Champs vs. Stars is the first season of a recurring special mini-series of MTV's long-running reality game show, The Challenge premiered November 21, 2017 and follows on from 2017's The Challenge: Champs vs. Pros. In the eight-week event, eleven alum from The Real World, The Challenge, and Are You the One? who have made it to the finals on a regular season of The Challenge compete against celebrities.

== Contestants ==
Player	Known For	Team	Charity	Raised	Finish
Johnny "Bananas" Devenanzio	The Real World: Key West	Champs	Special Olympics	$50,000	Winner
Emily Schromm	The Real World: D.C.	Champs	Girls, Inc.	$55,000	Winner
Chris "CT" Tamburello	The Real World: Paris	Champs	F.I.G.H.T.	$55,000	Winner
Josh Murray	The Bachelorette	Stars	Extra Special People	—N/a	Runner-up
Justina Valentine	Rapper / Wild 'n Out	Stars	Young Women's Leadership Network	—N/a	Runner-up
Michelle Waterson	UFC	Stars	MVP Vets and Players	—N/a	Runner-up
Tori Deal	Are You the One? 4	Champs	Pancreatic Cancer Action Network	—N/a	Episode 8
Wes Bergmann	The Real World: Austin	Champs	American Cancer Society	$5,000	Episode 8
Zach Nichols	The Real World: San Diego (2011)	Champs	Wigs 4 Kids Michigan	$5,000	Episode 8
Ariane Andrew	Former WWE pro wrestler	Stars	Black Girls Rock	—N/a	Episode 8
Kim Glass	Olympic volleyball	Stars	Covenant House	—N/a	Episode 8
Matt Rife	Wild 'n Out / TRL	Stars	World Wildlife Foundation	—N/a	Episode 8
Aneesa Ferreira	The Real World: Chicago	Champs	Suicide Prevention	$5,000	Episode 6
Riff Raff	Hip Hop Artist/From G's to Gents	Stars	Nevada SPCA	—N/a	Episode 5
Shawn Johnson	Olympic gymnastics	Stars	Hope Sports	—N/a	Episode 4
Romeo Miller	Rapper/Actor	Stars	Team Hope NOLA	—N/a	Episode 4
Ashley Mitchell	Real World: Ex-Plosion	Champs	Prevent Child Abuse America	$5,000	Episode 3 (Note: Ashley withdrew from the competition in Episode 3 due to a family emergency back at home. Zach gave his MVP earnings from the recent challenge won to Ashley. Tori is brought in as a replacement.)
Terrell Owens	NFL wide receiver	Stars	Ky Cares Foundation	—N/a	Episode 3 (Note: Prior to the "Slamball" challenge in Episode 3, Terrell Owens quit the competition after he engaged in a verbal altercation with CT at the end of the previous episode.)
Jenna Compono	Real World: Ex-Plosion	Champs	The Jason Gruen Foundation	—N/a	Episode 2 (Note: Jenna suffered a fractured ankle during the "Parkour the Course" challenge in Episode 2, and was subsequently forced to withdraw from the competition.)
Cory Wharton	Real World: Ex-Plosion	Champs	Kids' Food Basket	—N/a	Episode 1
Camila Nakagawa	Spring Break Challenge	Champs	—N/a		Episode 1 (Note: Camila was disqualified from the competition after the first challenge, following an incident in which she assaulted a production assistant.)

== Game summary ==
=== Challenge games ===
- Tow Truck: Starting with four players, two of each gender, teams must pull a semi-truck up a small incline from start to finish. Across the track are checkpoints. the first check point adds two more players, for a total of six pulling, while the other checkpoints have two players from each team that can swap out with a current player, if they desire. First team to finish wins.
  - Winners: Champs - MVP: Zach
- Parkour the Course: All across the arena flags are placed with pints ranging from 1 point up to 5 points per flag. Each team sends individuals to try to grab as many flags as they can. The opposing team from across the arena has access to a slingshot to try to hit the runner with a ball to end the round. The opposing team also sends one player to try to tag the runner to end the round. Each individual player gets one round on offense and one round on defense. Most points by the end of all the runs wins.
  - Winners: Champs - MVP: Emily
- Slamball: Similar to Basketball, in three rounds, each team send three players to try and score as many points as possible across an arena of trampolines. Players cannot jump around different trampolines with the ball. They must either shoot it, or pass it. If the shot is made from a marked trampoline, the team scores three points, instead of the usual one point. First to win three out of five rounds wins.
  - Winners: Champs - MVP: Zach
- Push Ball: Similar to soccer, teams must score as many goals as possible using a giant soccer ball in two rounds. Each team assigns player to defense and offense. After two 10-minutes rounds, most goals wins.
  - Winners: Champs - MVP: Aneesa
- Jumbo Foosball: Similar to the table game of Foosball, teams must try to kick the ball into the opposing team's goal to score a point. Players are tied to a pole and arranged similar to the table game, only being able to move left or right. Most points by the end of the game wins.
  - Winners: Champs - MVP: Wes
- Flag Pole: Individually, players must run towards a pole and must bring it down into the water. They must then swim as fast as they can towards a buoy. There are flags the players can grab to subtract seconds off their total times, with the harder to reach flags being worth more time subtracted. Fastest combined team time wins.
  - Winners: Champs - MVP: CT
- Sink or Swim: Competing as individuals, players must swim through a five obstacle course. At the end of each obstacle, players must release assigned balls before moving on to the next obstacle. The fastest male and female from each team win guaranteed spots in the final. They also get to choose one more player from their team to advance to the finals.
  - Winners
    - Champs: Bananas & Emily
    - Stars: Josh & Michelle
- Championship Series: In the final challenge, the teams participate in five challenges. The first four challenges are used to determine who will get an advantage in the fifth challenge. Whoever wins the fifth challenge wins the final challenge.
  - Don't Trip: Teams must traverse from pedestal to pedestal to reach a flag at the end of the course. If players fall off the pedestal or their one plank used to traverse each pedestal touches the floor, the team must start over. Once they reach the end, they must open a combination lock using numbers gained from each pedestal they crossed. First team to raise their team flag wins.
    - Winners: Champs
  - #Hard AF: Similar to "X Knocks the Spot" from Battle of the Exes, players of the same team stand on a platform and have to duck and jump over swinging bars. The opposing team has to try to knock off one player using rubber balls. If one player falls, their time is stopped and the team switch sides. Whichever team has the longer time after each team has gone wins.
    - Winners: Champs
  - Face Race: Teams must race around a race track with a small wooden car while trying to hit and collect cardboard faces of the opposing team. One team member is in the small wooden car to steer while blind-folded as the other two members push and collect. Once they reach the end of the track, they must arrange the order of the faces according to their charity they are playing for. First team to correctly arrange the faces to the charity wins.
    - Winners: Stars
  - Slide Ball: In a first-to-five game, teams must try to throw a ball in the opposing team's goal to score a point. The arena is very slippery and soapy and players are oiled up. First to 5 goals wins.
    - Winners: Champs
  - Tower of Power: Players are shackled together and must race around the stands to collect large plank puzzle pieces. Once their team collects all their respective pieces, they must dig through sand to find individual keys for each member to release them from their restraints. Each team has 25 total keys, minus three for each challenge they won in the Championship Series. Once released, they must complete their puzzle pyramid using the pieces they collect. First to finish the puzzle pyramid and scale up it is the winner of The Challenge: Champs vs. Stars.
    - Winners: Champs

=== Arena Games ===
- Target Practice: While standing on rotating platforms, players must try to throw balls across to their respective goals to score points. If any player falls off, their competitor can continue the round until they fall off or run out of balls. After two rounds, the player with the most points win.
  - Played by: Cory vs. Matt
- Ground Control: Players must pull themselves down several pegs to try to reach their button to push. Each player is directly linked to their competitor, with their competitor being pulled further away as they pull closer to the button. First player to push the button wins.
  - Played by: Wes vs. Romeo
- Lasso Me: Players are each given a hoop that they must try to wring it around their competitors body. Played in a best 3 out of 5 format, first to 3 pints wins.
  - Played by: Tori vs. Shawn
- Tic Tac Hole: In a combination of mini-golf and Connect 4, players must first try to sink a golf ball into the hole in the middle of the arena. If they are successful, they can place a Connect 4 piece onto the board. Players repeat this process until a player achieves 4 in a row on the main board. The first player that achieves 4 in a row on the board wins.
  - Played by: Bananas vs. Riff Raff
- Cage Match: Players star in the middle of a caged arena. When the round starts, they must try to grab the rope in the middle and bring it outside of the cage. If there is a stalemate from both players, to which there is barely any movement, the round resets back to start. First player to successfully get the rope outside the cage wins.
  - Played by: Aneesa vs. Michelle

=== Elimination chart ===
Episode		Gender	Winners		Arena contestants		Arena game	Arena outcome	
#	Challenge	Gender	Team	MVP	LVP pick	Voted In	Arena game	Winner	Loser
1	Tow Truck	Male	Champs	Zach	Cory	Matt	Target Practice	Matt	Cory
2/3	Parkour the Course	Female	Champs	Emily	Jenna	Ariane	—N/a (Note: Ariane was selected for the Arena in Episode 2, but did not have to compete. After Jenna's departure from the competition due to injury, Emily voted for Jenna as the LVP, and as a result, host The Miz announced that no female Arena would be held.)		
3/4	Slamball	Male	Champs	Zach	Wes	Romeo	Ground Control	Wes	Romeo
4	Push Ball	Female	Champs	Aneesa	Tori	Shawn	Lasso Me	Tori	Shawn
5	Jumbo Foosball	Male	Champs	Wes	Bananas	Riff Raff	Tic Tac Hole	Bananas	Riff Raff
6	Flag Pole	Female	Champs	CT	Aneesa	Michelle (Note: The Stars were tied after the LVP vote, so the Champs got to choose anyone of the female competitors for the Stars LVP)	Cage Match	Michelle	Aneesa
7	Sink or Swim	—N/a	—N/a	Bananas	—N/a				Tori
7	Sink or Swim	—N/a	—N/a	Emily	—N/a				Wes
7	Sink or Swim	—N/a	—N/a	CT (Note: The Champs and Stars competed individually, with the fastest time of each gender of each team moving on to the final. The third and final member for each team was then chosen by the winners.)	—N/a				Zach
7	Sink or Swim	—N/a	—N/a	Josh	—N/a				Ariane
7	Sink or Swim	—N/a	—N/a	Michelle	—N/a				Kim
7	Sink or Swim	—N/a	—N/a	Justina	—N/a				Matt
8	Championship Series	—N/a	Champs		Runner-Up: Stars				

=== Episode progress ===
Contestants	Episodes							
Contestants	1	2/3	3/4	4	5	6	7	Finale
Bananas	SAFE	SAFE	SAFE	SAFE	ELIM	SAFE	WIN	WINNER
CT	SAFE	SAFE	SAFE	SAFE	SAFE	WIN	SAFE	WINNER
Emily	SAFE	WIN	SAFE	SAFE	SAFE	SAFE	WIN	WINNER
Josh	SAFE	SAFE	SAFE	SAFE	SAFE	SAFE	WIN	LOSER
Justina	SAFE	SAFE	SAFE	SAFE	SAFE	SAFE	SAFE	LOSER
Michelle	SAFE	SAFE	SAFE	SAFE	SAFE	ELIM	WIN	LOSER
Tori	—N/a			ELIM	SAFE	SAFE	LAST	
Wes	SAFE	SAFE	ELIM	SAFE	WIN	SAFE	LAST	
Zach	WIN	SAFE	WIN	SAFE	SAFE	SAFE	LAST	
Ariane	SAFE	SAVE	SAFE	SAFE	SAFE	SAFE	LAST	
Kim	SAFE	SAFE	SAFE	SAFE	SAFE	SAFE	LAST	
Matt	ELIM	SAFE	SAFE	SAFE	SAFE	SAFE	LAST	
Aneesa	SAFE	SAFE	SAFE	WIN	SAFE	OUT	ARENA	
Riff Raff	SAFE	SAFE	SAFE	SAFE	OUT			
Shawn	SAFE	SAFE	SAFE	OUT				
Romeo	SAFE	SAFE	OUT					
Ashley	SAFE	SAFE	QUIT					
Terrell	SAFE	SAFE	QUIT					
Jenna	SAFE	MED						
Cory	OUT							
Camila	DQ							

Teams
The contestant is on the Champs team.
The contestant is on the Stars team.
Competition
The contestant won the final challenge.
The contestant did not win the final challenge.
The contestant was named "MVP" for their team and was immune from the Arena.
The contestant won in the Arena.
The contestant lost in the Arena and was eliminated.
The contestant was voted into the Arena, but did not have to compete.
The contestant didn't win the challenge or wasn't picked to be in the final challenge and was eliminated.
The contestant won the team challenge, but was disqualified from the competition due to physical violence.
The contestant was forced to leave the competition due to injury.
The contestant withdrew from the competition.

== Episodes ==
No. overall	No. in season	Title	Original release date	US viewers (millions)
7	1	"Tow Big, or Tow Home"	November 21, 2017	0.67
8	2	"Parkour All Obstacles"	November 28, 2017	0.54
9	3	"Slamballs and Elbow Brawls"	December 5, 2017	0.74
10	4	"When Push Comes to Shoving Stars"	December 12, 2017	0.54
11	5	"Playing Me for the Foos"	December 19, 2017	0.59
12	6	"Flag Poles and False Hopes"	December 26, 2017	0.52
13	7	"Sink, Purge, Repeat"	January 2, 2018	0.69
14	8	"It's the Final Countdown"	January 9, 2018	0.61
