= It's Showtime =

It's Showtime may refer to:

- It's Showtime (kickboxing), a kickboxing and martial arts promotion based in the Netherlands
- It's Showtime (Philippine TV program), a Philippine noontime variety show
  - It's Showtime Indonesia, an Indonesian spin-off of the Philippine show
- It's Showtime (film), a film produced by Fred Weintraub in 1976

== Music ==
- "It's Showtime!" (B'z song), a 2003 single by Japanese hard rock duo B'z from their album Big Machine
- "It's Showtime", a 1980 single by Katja Ebstein
- "It's Showtime", a 2003 single by American group The Mooney Suzuki
- "It's Showtime", a 2003 song by The Learning Station from their album Get Funky and Musical Fun
- "It's Showtime!", a track from the soundtrack of the 2015 video game Undertale by Toby Fox

== See also ==
- It's Showtime at the Apollo, an American variety show later known by its shortened name, Showtime at the Apollo
- Showtime (disambiguation)
