= Showtime =

Showtime or Show Time may refer to:

== Film ==
- Showtime (film), a 2002 American action/comedy film
- Showtime (video), a 1995 live concert video by Blur
- Show Time (film), a 2025 Indian crime thriller film

== Television ==
=== Networks and channels ===
- Showtime Networks, an American pay television company and subsidiary of Skydance Corporation
  - Showtime (TV network), an American premium cable television network whose flagship channel was renamed Paramount+ with Showtime in 2024
- Showtime Arabia, a former pay television service in the Middle East and North Africa that merged with Orbit to form OSN in 2009
- Showtime Movie Channels, a former group of Australian premium movie channels
- Showtime Scandinavia, a former television channel broadcasting action films in the Nordic countries

=== Series and programs ===
- Showtime (Australian TV series), a 1959–1960 variety show
- Showtime (Indian TV series), a 2024 Indian drama series
- Showtime (South Korean TV series), a reality television series since 2013
- It's Showtime (Philippine TV program), previously Showtime, a Philippine noontime variety show
- NBA Showtime, a pregame show aired before each NBA on NBC telecast

=== Episodes ===
- "Showtime" (Buffy the Vampire Slayer)
- "Showtime" (Law & Order)
- "Showtime" (M*A*S*H)
- "Showtime" (Stick)

== Music ==
=== Albums ===
- Showtime (Angel & Khriz album) (2008)
- Showtime (Bro'Sis album) (2004)
- Showtime (James Brown album) (1964)
- Show Time (Arnett Cobb album) (1987)
- Show Time (Ry Cooder album) (1977)
- Show Time (Doris Day album) (1960)
- Showtime (Dizzee Rascal album) (2004)
- Showtime (The J. Geils Band album) (1982)
- Showtime (Nitzer Ebb album) (1990)
- Showtime (Mick Ronson album) (1999)
- Show Time (Show Lo album) (2003)
- Show Time (Slave album)
- Showtime, by TV-2 (2011)

=== Songs ===
- "Show Time", by The Detroit Emeralds (1968)
- "Showtime", by Nelly Furtado from Loose (2006)
- "Showtime", by Lower Than Atlantis from Changing Tune (2012)
- "Showtime", by MC Ren from Renincarnated (2009)

== Sports ==
- Showtime (basketball), a style of basketball associated with the Los Angeles Lakers from 1979 to 1991
- Showtime All-Star Wrestling, an American professional wrestling promotion based in Nashville, Tennessee
- Eric Young (wrestler) (born 1979), nickname for Canadian professional wrestler
- Patrick Kane (born 1988), nickname for American professional ice hockey player
- Shohei Ohtani (born 1994), nickname for Japanese professional baseball player
- Anthony Pettis (born 1987), nicknamed Showtime

== Other uses ==
- Showtime (busking), a dance style for buskers in the New York City Subway
- "Showtime" Marching Band, a marching band from Howard University in Washington, DC
- The Sims 3: Showtime, the sixth expansion pack for The Sims 3
- Showtime Rotisserie, a small oven invented and advertised by Ron Popeil
- Showtime, a fragrance endorsed by Kylie Minogue
- Princess Peach: Showtime!, a 2024 Nintendo Switch video game starring Princess Peach

== See also ==
- It's Showtime (disambiguation)
- ShoTime (disambiguation)
