= Love & Hip Hop: New York season 7 =

Love & Hip Hop: New York
- Season 7
- Cover used by the iTunes Store
- Starring: Yandy Smith-Harris; Kimbella Vanderhee; Cardi B; Bianca Bonnie; Mariahlynn; Felicia "Snoop" Pearson; Remy Ma
- No. of episodes: 16

Release
- Original network: VH1
- Original release: November 21, 2016 – February 27, 2017

Season chronology
- ← Previous; Season 6 Next → Season 8

The seventh season of the reality television series Love & Hip Hop: New York aired on VH1 from November 21, 2016 until February 27, 2017. The season was primarily filmed in New York City, New York. It was executively produced by Mona Scott-Young and Stephanie R. Gayle for Monami Entertainment, Toby Barraud, Stefan Springman, Mala Chapple, David DiGangi, and Josh Richards for Eastern TV, and Nina L. Diaz and Vivian Gomez for VH1.

The series chronicles the lives of several women and men in the New York area, involved in hip hop music. It consists of 16 episodes, including a two-part reunion special hosted by Nina Parker.

== Production ==
The cast of the seventh season, from left to right: Mariahlynn, Remy, Snoop, Yandy, Kimbella, Cardi and Bianca.

The seventh season title screen.

On November 14, 2016, VH1 announced that Love & Hip Hop would be returning for a seventh season on November 21, 2016.

Kimbella Vanderhee returned as a series regular after being absent from the show since the second season. Bianca Bonnie was promoted to the main cast, along with The Wire star Felicia "Snoop" Pearson. After a controversial storyline last season involving their duelling pregnancies, Tara and Amina were phased out of the show, appearing only as supporting cast members. One of the season's leading storylines was the violent feud between Yandy and Mendeecees' baby mamas Samantha Wallace and Erika DeShazo, as they battle for custody over Mendeecees' children. Samantha and Erika would join the supporting cast, along with Samantha's mother Kim Wallace and Mendeecees' mother Judy Harris. The season's supporting cast, the largest in the show's history so far, would also include Juelz Santana, Juju C., fiancée of Cam'ron, Snoop's girlfriend J. Adrienne, radio personality DJ Drewski and his girlfriend Sky Landish, Cardi's sister Hennessy Carolina and producer Swift Star. Singers Sofi Green and Major Galore, Rich's daughter Ashley Trowers, his girlfriend Jade Wifey and Swift's girlfriend Asia Cole appeared in minor supporting roles. Love & Hip Hop: Hollywood star Moniece Slaughter made a special crossover appearance in two episodes.

On December 30, 2016, Cardi B announced she was leaving the show to focus on her rap career.

== Synopsis ==
New York City, the place where hip hop was born and raised. A city full of familiar faces, where families are not always chosen and your past can stand in the way of achieving your dreams. In this city, finding true love comes at a price, and loyalty is never guaranteed. Even the strongest bonds can crumble. So keep your friends close cause the 'ops are around every corner. And just when you think you've made it, this concrete jungle never stops throwing obstacles in your way. So when you're finally all the way up, you better not let anything tear you down. So welcome back to the place where it all began. The streets have been waiting for you. 'Cause this is love and hip hop.

— Remy Ma, opening monologue

With her husband Mendeecees in jail, Yandy finds herself in a custody battle with his baby mamas Samantha and Erika over their children. Kimbella struggles to move forward from Juelz's past infidelities and trust him again as he embarks on a career comeback. Cardi's fame has reached new heights but her attraction to her producer Swift creates new dramas. Bianca links up with old flame DJ Drewski, igniting a feud with his girlfriend Sky. The creep squad is torn apart after Self and Cisco get into a contract war over Mariahlynn. Snoop and her girlfriend J Adrienne come to blows over J's intense jealousy. Remy's career is better than ever but she is starting to feel the pressure from Papoose to expand their family.

== Cast ==
=== Starring ===
- Yandy Smith-Harris (15 episodes)
- Kimbella Vanderhee (12 episodes)
- Cardi B (14 episodes)
- Bianca Bonnie (12 episodes)
- Mariahlynn (14 episodes)
- Felicia "Snoop" Pearson (13 episodes)
- Remy Ma (10 episodes)

=== Also starring ===
- Hennessy Carolina (9 episodes)
- Rich Dollaz (14 episodes)
- DJ Self (13 episodes)
- Cisco Rosado (11 episodes)
- Samantha Wallace (11 episodes)
- Juelz Santana (11 episodes)
- J. Adrienne (13 episodes)
- Swift Star (7 episodes)
- Papoose (9 episodes)
- DJ Drewski (10 episodes)
- Sofi Green (4 episodes)
- Sky Landish (10 episodes)
- Kim Wallace (7 episodes)
- Erika DeShazo (12 episodes)
- Judy Harris (8 episodes)
- Asia Davies (3 episodes)
- Ashley Trowers (4 episodes)
- Jade Wifey (3 episodes)
- Juju C. (10 episodes)
- Moniece Slaughter (2 episodes)
- Peter Gunz (9 episodes)
- Tara Wallace (5 episodes)
- Major Galore (5 episodes)
- Amina Buddafly (3 episodes)

Nef Harris, Dejanae Mackie, Jace Smith, Miracle Kaye Hall, Jewel Escobar, Shaft, Irene Mackie, Whitney Pankey and Cory Gunz appear as guest stars in several episodes. Mendeecees Harris appears via phone call conversations with Yandy, as he was incarcerated during filming. The show also features minor appearances from notable figures within the hip hop industry and New York's social scene, including Fat Joe, French Montana, Sisterhood of Hip Hop's Nyemiah Supreme, Cam'ron, Vado, Method Man, Lil Durk, Noreaga, Konshens, Red Café and Michael K. Williams.

The show features cameo appearances from the cast's children, including Kimbella and Juelz' children Leandro, Juelz and Bella James, Mendeeces's children Lil Mendeecees, Aasim, Omere and Skylar Harris, and Peter's children Jamison, Kaz, Cori, Gunner and Bronx Pankey. James R. appears in an uncredited cameo appearance, he would join the supporting cast in season eight.

== Episodes ==
No. overall	No. in season	Title	Original release date	US viewers (millions)
80	1	"All The Way Up"	November 21, 2016	2.35
In the season premiere, Remy Ma and Papoose try to get on the same page. Cardi B's newfound fame causes new problems. Yandy struggles to keep the family together in Mendeecees' absence. Juelz Santana prepares for a return to music and hopes Kimbella will settle her beef with a longtime friend. Kimbella returns to the opening credits and Bianca and Snoop are added to the opening credits, replacing departing cast members Moe & Lexxy, Tara and Amina, who are demoted to the supporting cast. Hennessy, Samantha, Juelz, J. Adrienne and Swift join the supporting cast. Although credited, Mariahlynn does not appear.
81	2	"Strawberries"	November 28, 2016	2.48
Bianca rekindles a working relationship with old flame DJ Drewski. Kimbella pops up on Juelz Santana at the studio. Cardi B takes her relationship with her producer to the next level. Snoop's flirtation with a potential artist leaves J at her wit's end. DJ Drewski, Sofi Green and Sky join the supporting cast. Although credited, Mariahlynn does not appear.
82	3	"Chest Pains"	December 5, 2016	2.17
Yandy wants to keep the family together, but when Mendeecees' mother Judy spreads rumors about Samantha, it leads the family into an all out war. Drewski wants to put Bianca on a track, but his girlfriend disapproves of his plan. Snoop and J question their future together. Kim, Erika and Judy join the supporting cast. Although credited, Remy does not appear.
83	4	"Get It Poppin"	December 12, 2016	2.28
Yandy comes face to face with Erika and Samantha. J pops up and pops off on Sofi Green. Rich's daughter returns to NY with a mission to check his new girlfriend. Cardi discovers that Swift has a girlfriend and loses her mind. Asia, Ashley and Jade join the supporting cast. Although credited, Kimbella, Bianca and Remy do not appear.
84	5	"Past and Present"	December 12, 2016	2.54
Cardi deals with the repercussions of her actions. Drewski finds himself torn between business and pleasure. Kimbella discovers things are not as they seem with Juelz. Rich Dollaz tries to manage the fallout after his girlfriend Jade runs into a ghost from his past. Juju joins the supporting cast. Although credited, Yandy and Remy do not appear.
85	6	"Lock and Key"	December 19, 2016	2.29
Bianca puts her feelings on the line with Drewski, leaving Sky to intervene. Snoop confronts her past while she and J make a big decision about their future. Yandy takes her beef with Erika to a new level. Moniece from Love & Hip Hop: Hollywood makes a shocking appearance for Rich and Jade Wifey. Moniece joins the supporting cast, although she would only appear in this episode. Although credited, Kimbella and Remy do not appear.
86	7	"Secret's Out"	December 26, 2016	2.28
Bianca seeks revenge on Mariahlynn. Drewski tries to win Sky over. Mendeecees steps into the drama between Yandy and Erika. Rich tips off DJ Self about Cisco. Yandy drops a bomb that changes the game. Although credited, Snoop and Remy do not appear.
87	8	"Firing Squad"	January 2, 2017	2.61
Yandy's secret has ripple effects. Remy makes a bold business decision to get more time with Papoose. Mariahlynn juggles her professional drama with family struggles. Peter Gunz attempts to restore order to the creep squad, only to have it blow up in his face. Although credited, Bianca does not appear.
88	9	"Coo Coo for Koko"	January 9, 2017	2.18
Papoose surprises Remy with a gift. Yandy meets with a mystery someone who might have some news about Samantha. Snoop and J try to work together. Peter and Cisco come face to face for a second time. Tara and Major Galore join the supporting cast. Sway Calloway, Missy Elliott, Lil' Kim, Salt-N-Pepa and Queen Latifah appear in archival footage of Remy's Hip Hop Honors performance. Although credited, Kimbella and Cardi do not appear.
89	10	"Don't Mess with the Exes"	January 16, 2017	2.49
Peter tries to convince Rich to make amends with Cisco. Mariahlynn and Major Galore's issues with one another take center stage. Drewski finds an interesting way to confront Sky's trust issues. Yandy and Judy confront Erika and Samantha about the tape recordings. Although credited, Kimbella, Cardi, Bianca and Remy do not appear.
90	11	"Creepin' Back"	January 23, 2017	2.71
Amina gives birth to baby Bronx while Peter tries to win another chance at love with Tara. Cardi gets an unexpected letter from Tommy. Remy surprises Papoose with a special gift. Kimbella puts her friendship with Yandy in the middle of her relationship problems with Juelz. Amina returns as a supporting cast member. Although credited, Bianca, Mariahlynn and Snoop do not appear.
91	12	"Cancun – Part 1"	January 30, 2017	2.38
Yandy brings an uninvited guest to Mexico which fuels her conflict with Kimbella. Juju's book stirs up some unexpected drama. Back in New York, Self gets revenge on Cisco.
92	13	"Cancun – Part 2"	February 6, 2017	2.33
While Amina is visiting New York, Peter discusses their separation and the future of their relationship. Yandy confronts Juju again about the book. Tara and Amina are face to face for the first time in over a year. An unexpected guest shows up at Lil Mendeecees' birthday party. Although credited, Snoop does not appear.
93	14	"The Sit-Down"	February 13, 2017	2.27
In the season finale, the women in Mendeecees' life get together for a final sit down. Swift reveals his feelings to Cardi. Self makes a choice between Mariahlynn and Major Galore. Sky gives Drewski a dose of his own medicine.
94	15	"Reunion – Part 1"	February 20, 2017	2.51
The cast reunites as host Nina Parker dives into all of the drama of season seven. Cardi B and Asia come face to face since their last encounter while heated words are exchanged among the women in Mendeecees' life. The creep squad hash out their unresolved issues. host: Nina Parker
95	16	"Reunion – Part 2"	February 27, 2017	2.63
The drama continues as the story unfolds with Yandy, Erika, and Samantha. Tara, Peter and Amina discuss their relationship. Drewski reveals a surprise. host: Nina Parker

== Webisodes ==
=== Check Yourself ===
Love & Hip Hop New York: Check Yourself, which features the cast's reactions to each episode, was released weekly with every episode on digital platforms.

=== Bonus scenes ===
Deleted scenes from the season's episodes were released weekly as bonus content on VH1's official website.

== Music ==
Several cast members had their music featured on the show and released singles to coincide with the airing of the episodes.

List of songs performed and/or featured in Love & Hip Hop: New York season seven
Title	Performer	Album	Episode(s)	Notes	Ref
Back 2 The Crib (feat. Cardi B)	Swift Star	OnDemand	1	performed onstage	
All the Way Up (feat. Fat Joe & French Montana)	Remy Ma	Plato O Plomo	1	performed onstage	
Ima Get It (feat. Jaquae)	Bianca Bonnie	The 9th Year	2	performed onstage	
Living Life	Sofi Green	single	2	performed onstage	
Up In The Studio Gettin' Blown	Juelz Santana	single	3	performed in studio session	
Miss You	Bianca Bonnie	10 Plus	3	performed briefly in scene	
Make It Official (feat. Maino & Bianca Bonnie)	DJ Drewski	single	3, 5	played and performed in street scene performed in studio session	
Pull Up	Cardi B	Gangsta Bitch Music, Vol. 2	4	performed in studio session	
On Fleek	Cardi B	Gangsta Bitch Music, Vol. 1	4	performed onstage	
I Don't Wanna Hurt No More (feat. PnB Rock & DJ Self)	Major Galore	single	5	performed onstage	
Work On The Way (feat. The Execs)	Mariahlynn	single	6	performed in rehearsal space	
Phone Ring	Bianca Bonnie	The 9th Year	6	performed onstage	
Physical (feat. DJ Jayhood)	Mariahlynn	single	7	performed in rehearsal space and onstage	
98 Ma$e	Sofi Green	single	9	performed in studio and onstage	
Work It (feat. Nelly Furtado & Trina)	Remy Ma	VH1's Hip Hop Honors	9	performed onstage	
Real Back In Style	1st Lady Shawne	single	9	performed onstage	
Love Come Down (feat. Konshens)	Major Galore	single	10, 14	performed in rehearsal space and onstage	
Popping Tags	Mariahlynn	single	10	performed onstage	
Black Love (Remix) (feat. Remy Ma)	Papoose	single	11	played during scene	
Darkside	Papoose	single	12	played in music video shoot	
Back To What I Know (Music In My Room)	Amina Buddafly	Music In My Room (EP)	13	performed onstage	
She A Bad Bitch (Bad Bitch Alert) (Remix) (feat. Cardi B)	Red Café	single	14	performed in music video shoot	
Once Upon a Time (I Was a Hoe)	Mariahlynn	single	14	performed onstage	
