= Herbert H. Lehman High School =

Public school in New York City

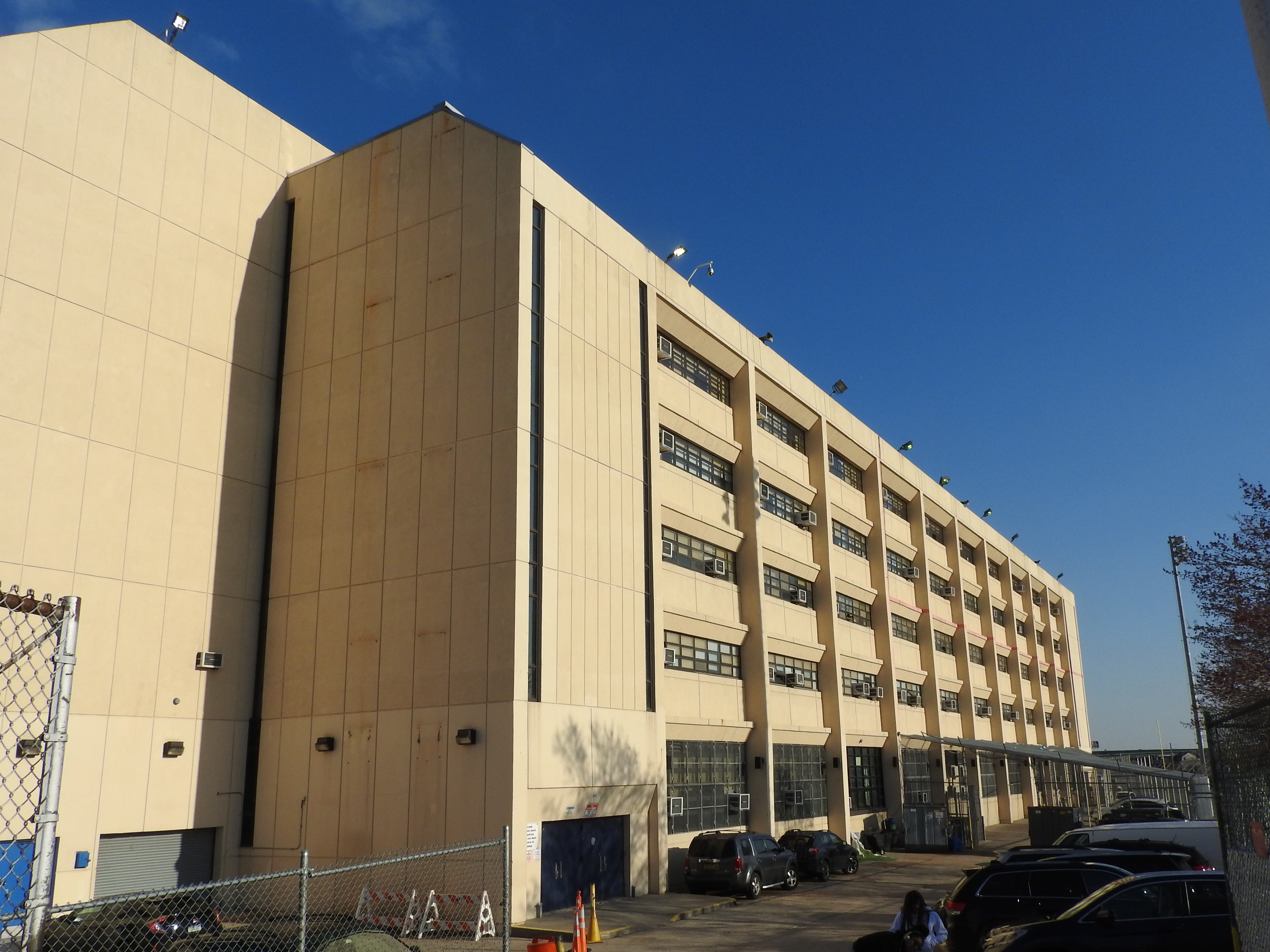

Location
- 3000 E Tremont Ave; Bronx, New York 10461; United States; 40.840516°N 73.839183°W

Information
- Type: Public
- Motto: Engage and Empower For Tomorrow
- Established: 1970
- School district: New York City Geographic District #8
- NCES School ID: 360008501964
- Principal: Denise Williams
- Teaching staff: 84.67 (on an FTE basis)
- Grades: 9-12
- Enrollment: 1,071 (2022-2023)
- Student to teacher ratio: 12.65
- Campus: City: Large
- Colors: Royal Blue and Orange
- Mascot: Lion
- Website: www.lehmanhs.com

Herbert H. Lehman High School is a public high school at 3000 East Tremont Avenue, in the Westchester Square section of the Bronx, New York City. The school is named after former New York State Governor Herbert Henry Lehman (1878–1963). The school is not affiliated with Lehman College in the Bronx, also named after the governor.

== History ==
The school's first graduating class was in June 1974.

In late 2006 and early 2007 the school underwent an external renovation that included painting the entire building. Much of the work was done during the night to avoid disrupting classes.

Robert Leder was the school's second principal and had remained principal for most of its 37-year existence. After a New York City Department of Education's investigation of two assistant principals and abuse of overtime funds, Mr. Leder was given the choice to resign his post as principal at the end of the year, or be immediately removed and reassigned. His decision, amid a great deal of student and parent protest, was to resign effective June 30, 2008.

The new executive principal, appointed in July 2008, was Dr. Janet Saraceno, formerly the principal of High School for Media and Communications in Manhattan. After 3 years, Saraceno resigned due to student grade tampering, and was replaced by Mrs. Rose Lobianco, the former assistant principal of Columbus High School in the Bronx. Ms. Lobianco left the school in August, 2015 to take the helm of Bronx Leadership Academy II.

She was replaced by John Powers, who previously served as assistant principal of English at The Bronx High School of Science. The start of his tenure came as the school faced mounting challenges. It narrowly avoided being shut down by the state in 2013, only to be named an "out of time" school in 2015. During his eight-year tenure, Powers oversaw the extensive rebranding of the school, creation of a new website, construction of a state-of-the-art library, new lockers, and addition of college courses through SUNY Albany. School metrics improved as well. By August 2022, the graduation rate reached 82%, up from 40% in 2015. Enrollment increased to 1,010 students, up 28% since 2018. On April 30, 2023, Powers announced the school would be taken out of state receivership and was rated as "good standing" by the New York State Education Department. He retired on May 1, 2023.

== Athletics ==
=== Sports ===
Lehman offers a variety of athletic clubs and teams for the students. Its mascot is a lion and its colors are blue and orange. Its varsity football, baseball, soccer, track and field and wrestling teams have had success over the years.

Perhaps the most followed sport at Lehman is football. The former coach of Lehman's varsity football team, Carmine Colasanto, has been recognized as one of the PSAL's best coaches. He has recorded over 200 career victories and has been honored with numerous coach of the year awards. Coach Colasanto was the longest tenured coach in the PSAL until his resignation before the 2008 season. Some of the players Coach Colasanto had were former NFL players Doug Marrone (Head Coach at Syracuse University), Charles Puleri. Lehman football has produced numerous IA players and have sent alum to Tulane, Georgia Tech, Maryland, Syracuse and Cincinnati among numerous prominent schools. The football team is now led by the only woman head football coach in the PSAL, Ms Deborah Vance. Coach Vance had a successful run with the Junior Varsity and is now establishing her legacy with the varsity, leading Lehman from 1–8 to a 5–4 record and a playoff appearance in 2009. The school's varsity football team has been consistently ranked among the PSAL's best and has been in numerous Citywide championships. Junior varsity football is also offered and the team has also met with success in recent years, even managing to finish the 2007 season a perfect 8-0, and winning the New York City championship.

Lehman's soccer team won their first New York City Championship back in the PSAL B division in 2001 and made an appearance back to the finals in the PSAL A division in 2006, eventually falling against MLK Jr High School 4–0. Also in the 2009–2010 season, Lehman finished the Bronx A Division with a record of 9–0–3, an undefeated season although they finished second behind Christopher Columbus. Led by Coach Straw, Lehman has become one of the best teams in the Bronx alongside Christopher Columbus and Bronx Science. Since 2001, they have made it to the playoffs every season finishing in the top 4.

=== Logo and uniforms ===
Since its inception the school's colors have been orange and blue and the mascot the lion. The home football uniform consists of a Royal blue jersey with blue numbers outlined in white and orange piping with blue pants highlighted in orange and white. The road uniform is a white jersey with blue numbers outlined in orange with orange piping and it accompanies blue pants. The helmet is solid orange with a blue paw print on both sides.

The Baseball uniform consist of white pants with a blue and orange stripe down the pant legs. The jersey consist of a white top with an interlocking "HL" which is blue outlined in orange. The hat is all blue with an HL logo in white with orange outlining.

The basketball team also has representation within the PSAL but isn't as prominent as football, baseball, soccer or softball.

== Collocated school ==
Renaissance High School for Musical Theater & Technology, Westchester Square Academy, Pelham Lab High School, Schuylerville Preparatory High School, & Bronx River High School are now co-located with Lehman on the 2nd, 3rd and 4th floor.

== Notable alumni ==
- Larry Lawton (1979 - did not graduate), ex-convict and motivational speaker
- Bobby Bonilla (1981), former MLB All-Star
- Tarana Burke (1981), activist and founder of the MeToo movement
- Doug Marrone (1982), NFL coach/former NFL player
- Dominick Pezzulo (1983), PAPD officer who was killed in the September 11 attacks
- Yvonne Harrison (1993), track and field athlete who competed for Puerto Rico
- Desus Nice (1999), TV personality
- French Montana (2002 - did not graduate), Grammy Award nominated rapper
- T. J. Rivera (2006), former MLB player
- Ritchie Torres (2006), congressperson for New York's 15th congressional district
- Cardi B (2010), Grammy Award winning rapper
- Hennessy Carolina (2013), TV personality, sister of Cardi B
