= ShoTime =

ShoTime may refer to:

- nickname of Sho Nakata (born 1989), Japanese baseball player
- nickname of Shohei Ohtani (born 1994), Japanese baseball player

== See also ==
- Showtime (disambiguation)
