= Chicken Noodle Soup (J-Hope song) =

Single by J-Hope featuring Becky G
- Language: English; Korean; Spanish
- Released: September 27, 2019
- Length: 3:55
- Label: Big Hit
- Songwriters: Jinbo; Supreme Boi; Adora; J-Hope; Brasa; Pdogg; Becky G; Jamal Reynolds; Bianca Dupree; Desmond "Troy" Ryan; Anthony Glover
- Producers: Jinbo; Supreme Boi; Pdogg

J-Hope singles chronology
"Airplane" (2018)	"Chicken Noodle Soup" (2019)	"More" (2022)

Becky G singles chronology
"Secrets" (2019)	"Chicken Noodle Soup" (2019)	"Mala Santa" (2019)

Music video
- j-hope 'Chicken Noodle Soup (feat. Becky G)' MV on YouTube

"Chicken Noodle Soup" is a song by South Korean rapper J-Hope of BTS featuring American singer Becky G. It was released through Big Hit Entertainment on September 27, 2019. The song samples DJ Webstar and rapper Young B's song of the same name, featuring the Voice of Harlem from Webstar's 2006 album Webstar Presents: Caught in the Web.

== Background ==
J-Hope expressed in a V Live stream that the original "Chicken Noodle Soup" by Webstar and Young B was meaningful to him because he often listened to it when he first began learning to dance. J-Hope wanted his version of "Chicken Noodle Soup" to be featured on his debut mixtape Hope World as the track represented his passion for dance. He also wanted the track to feature another artist; but as a collaboration failed to occur, the track was not released in 2018.

J-Hope and Becky G met at the 2019 Billboard Music Awards in May, with J-Hope previously saying that he would like to collaborate with her.

Becky G and J-Hope contributed to writing the trilingual lyrics, which center around one's identity and paying respect to their roots.

== Release ==
Big Hit Entertainment released the song on September 27, 2019, during BTS' hiatus period. It was released for free on multiple platforms, and a download link of the mp3 file was provided on Big Hit's Twitter account.

Following the release of the music video, both Young B. and DJ Webstar voiced their enthusiasm for the "Chicken Noodle Soup" remake separately on social media.

J-Hope also issued an Internet dance challenge, encouraging his fans to try the choreography. He posted a video of himself doing the dance on BTS' official TikTok, and filmed fellow BTS groupmates Jungkook, Jimin and V dancing to the song on V Live.

=== Commercial performance ===
"Chicken Noodle Soup" debuted at number 81 on the Billboard Hot 100, with 9.7 million streams and 11,000 downloads for the week ending October 4. J-Hope became the first member of BTS to chart on the Hot 100 as a solo artist outside of the group, the third Korean solo artist to rank on the chart (after Psy and CL), and the sixth Korean artist overall to do so. "Chicken Noodle Soup" also debuted at number one on the World Digital Song Sales chart and is his second song to do so after 2018's "Daydream".

== Music video ==
"Chicken Noodle Soup" – Full music video

The music video was directed by Yongseok Choi of Lumpens, and co-produced by Nathan Scherrer. It was shot in Los Angeles and features over 50 dancers of different nationalities.

The video incorporates dance moves from the original "Chicken Noodle Soup" dance, as well as new choreography that includes flapping elbows with bent legs to mimic a chicken. The video ends with an informal clip of the dance crew singing and dancing. This addition was requested by J-Hope with the intention of capturing the positive energy on the day of the film shoot.

== Promotion ==
After Becky G tweeted "#BeckyHasAnotherSecret", BTS tweeted at her saying "I have a secret too..." with the hashtag "#CNS" on September 26.

== Credits and personnel ==
Adapted from SoundCloud.

- Jinbo – production, songwriting, keyboard, synthesizer, rhythm programming, background vocals
- Supreme Boi – production, songwriting, keyboard, rhythm programming, background vocals
- Pdogg – production, songwriting, synthesizer, rhythm programming,
- Adora – songwriting, background vocals
- J-Hope – songwriting
- Brasa – songwriting
- Becky G – songwriting, background vocals
- Jamal Reynolds – songwriting
- Bianca Dupree – songwriting
- Desmond "Troy" Ryan – songwriting
- Anthony Glover – songwriting
- Jaycen Joshua – mixing (at Larrabee Sound Studios, North Hollywood, California)
- Jacob Richards – mixing (assistant)
- Mike Seaberg – mixing (assistant)
- DJ Riggins – mixing (assistant)
- Chris Gehringer – mastering (at Sterling Sound, New York)

== Charts ==
Chart (2019)	Peak position
Argentina (Argentina Hot 100)	63
Australian Digital Tracks (ARIA)	27
Canada Hot 100 (Billboard)	55
Denmark Digital Song Sales (Billboard)	8
Euro Digital Song Sales (Billboard)	13
Finland Digital Song Sales (Billboard)	1
France (SNEP)	8
Greece (IFPI)	53
Hungary (Single Top 40)	4
Ireland (IRMA)	80
Lithuania (AGATA)	60
New Zealand Hot Singles (RMNZ)	13
Norway Digital Song Sales (Billboard)	5
Portugal Digital Song Sales (Billboard)	6
Russia (Tophit)	54
Scottish Singles Sales (Official Charts)	19
Sweden Digital Song Sales (Billboard)	2
UK Singles (Official Charts)	82
US Billboard Hot 100	81
US World Digital Songs (Billboard)	1
