= Hennessy Carolina =

American influencer and fashion designer (born 1995)

- Born: Hennessy Carolina Almánzar; December 22, 1995 (age 30); New York City, U.S.
- Other names: Hennessy Carolina; Henny
- Education: Fashion Institute of Technology
- Occupations: Influencer; fashion designer; TV personality
- Years active: 2015–present
- Partner: Michelle Diaz (2017–2021)
- Relatives: Cardi B (sister); GloRilla (cousin)

Hennessy Carolina Almánzar (born December 22, 1995), is an American influencer, fashion designer and TV personality. Born and raised in New York City, she gained popularity on the VH1 reality TV series Love & Hip Hop: New York. She is the younger sister of rapper Cardi B.

== Early life ==
Hennessy Carolina Almánzar was born on December 22, 1995, in the Bronx, New York City, to Carlos Almánzar, a Dominican, and Clara, a Trinidadian of African and Spanish descent. She was named after the cognac Hennessy, as her father arrived intoxicated on Hennessy at her birth and suggested the name to her mother. She identifies as Afro-Latina and has an older sister, Belcalis Marlenis (born 1992), also known as Cardi B. She completed her early education at a local private high school before attending Renaissance High School for Musical Theater & Technology, a vocational high school located on the Herbert H. Lehman High School campus.

== Career ==
Hennessy Carolina began her career in late 2015, posting videos on the Vine app alongside her elder sister, Cardi B. Following Vine's success, she transitioned to television. In 2016, Hennessy appeared as herself on episodes of Love & Hip Hop: Check Yourself, after auditioning for the Love & Hip Hop TV series.

Hennessy appeared on Love & Hip Hop: New York, with a total of 12 episode appearances throughout the show's run from 2016 to 2018. She first appeared as a guest star in Season 6 of Love & Hip Hop: New York, playing herself as Cardi B's friend and confidante. She later joined the supporting cast in Season 7, where she acted as a matchmaker for Cardi B and producer Swift Star. At the Season 7 reunion, Hennessy got into a physical altercation with Major Galore while defending her sister. After leaving the show, Hennessy made a one-episode appearance in Season 8. Additionally, she filmed scenes for two more episodes, but they were cut from the main broadcast and released as bonus content on VH1's website.

Hennessy appeared on The Challenge: Champs vs. Stars, a special mini-series of MTV's The Challenge, specifically Season 2, which premiered on April 17, 2018. In an interview, Hennessy admitted that appearing on Champs vs. Stars was intimidating. "To be honest, I was really scared of going on the show because they do a lot,' she said. Although the $150,000 prize goes to a charity of their choice, the competition is complicated by political tensions between The Challenge veterans and celebrity contestants". She withdrew from the competition after multiple confrontations with cast members, citing concerns for her well-being.

In a 2018 interview with Paper Magazine, Hennessy reflected on her and her sister Cardi B's rise to fame. "It's a blessing, but it comes with challenges," she said. "Sometimes you can't express your opinion, and not everyone will agree with you. Overall, it's a blessing." Hennessy walked the runway for Philipp Plein's show in Milan in September 2018. Although she was nervous.

In November 2018, Hennessy collaborated with Boohoo on a limited-edition collection. The collection featured sequined dresses, glittery separates, jewel-tone blazers, and strappy heels, all priced under £70 and available in sizes UK 6-24. Hennessy appeared on two episodes of the television game show Hip Hop Squares in 2019. That same year, in August, she landed a campaign with Moschino. In a 2019 interview with Galore, Hennessy shared her career aspirations: "I want to dominate the fashion industry and I would eventually like to get into the makeup industry. As of October 2024, Hennessy has accumulated over 8 million followers on Instagram.

== Personal life ==
Hennessy Carolina publicly identified as bisexual in an instagram post in 2018. She was in a relationship with Michelle "Mel" Diaz from 2017 to 2021.

== Filmography ==
=== Television ===
| Year | Title | Role | Notes | Ref. |
|---|---|---|---|---|
| 2016 - 2018 | Love & Hip Hop: New York | Herself | 12 Episodes | |
| 2016 | Love & Hip Hop: Check Yourself | Herself | 2 Episodes | |
| 2018 | The Challenge: Champs vs. Stars season 2 | Herself | 3 Episodes | |
| 2019 | Hip Hop Squares | Herself | 2 Episodes | |
