= Webstar Presents: Caught in the Web =

Studio album by Webstar
- Released: September 26, 2006
- Genre: Hip hop; R&B; crunk
- Label: Scrilla Hill; Universal Republic
- Producer: Ron Browz; The Drizzle; Rock House; DJ Tedssmooth; T.T. The Supasonics; Chaun Don; DJ Webstar

Webstar chronology
Webstar Presents: Caught in the Web (2006)	Uptown Harlem (2008)

Young B chronology
Webstar Presents: Caught in the Web (2006)

Webstar Presents: Caught in the Web is the debut album of DJ Webstar. The first single from the album, "Chicken Noodle Soup", was later incorporated into a popular dance.

The album features other Scilla Hill recording artists such as Young Wee, Chaun Don and The Voice of Harlem.

== Track listing ==
1. "I Came To Dance" (with Young B.)
2. "Don't Stop" (with Young B. featuring Ron Browz, Severe and T-Rex)
3. "Chicken Noodle Soup" (with Young B. featuring The Voice of Harlem)
4. "In My Video" (with Young B.)
5. "Get Higher" (with Young B. featuring Young We)
6. "Like This" (with Young B. featuring Chaun Don)
7. "Tone Wop" (with The Voice of Harlem, Young B and G. Dot)
8. "Gettin' Money Over Here" (with Cashflow and Young We)
9. "Fresh" (with Chaun Don)
10. "Dolla Bills" (featuring T-Rex, Cashflow, and Young We)
11. "Step Out" (featuring Young We)
12. "Cloud 9" (featuring Cashflow and Africa Miranda)
13. "Chicken Noodle Soup" (Karaoke Instrumental)

== Singles ==
Single information
"Chicken Noodle Soup"
- Released: September 12, 2006
- Label: Scilla Hill
