= Showtime (busking) =

Dancing in New York City Subway cars

A group doing showtime

Showtime is a type of performance litefeet/pole dancing done as a busking routine using hand holds installed inside New York City Subway cars. Showtime includes acrobatic flips, hat and shoe tricks, and pole tricks. Estimates have placed the number of Showtime dancers in the low hundreds.

Litefeet, a type of dance that emerged from Harlem and the Bronx, succeeds breakdancing / b-boying emerging in the 1980s. It is often done to 100-BPM tracks. Some hip-hop dancers on the subway have looked down on the common litefeet moves used by other buskers.

In March 2014, New York City Police Department (NYPD) commissioner Bill Bratton announced that the NYPD would, under the broken windows theory philosophy, prosecute quality of life crimes against Showtime and subway dancers for breaking the Metropolitan Transportation Authority’s policy against performing and panhandling on the trains, citing that performances have been on the upswing since 2008. Performers have been arrested for reckless endangerment. In January 2015, the TA launched a publicity campaign, Courtesy Counts, Manners Make a Better Ride, including the anti-Showtime slogan "Poles Are For Your Safety, Not Your Latest Routine", alongside other advertisements against manspreading, "pole hogging", and public nail clipping.

WAFFLE (We Are Family for Life Entertainment) is a New York City–based Litefeet and street-dance collective that has been the subject of multiple media profiles. One of its members appeared on Season 8 of America’s Got Talent, and the team later competed on Season 13. The group’s founder has been credited with playing a significant role in the rise of the “Showtime” style of subway performance, contributing to its emergence as a widely recognized cultural phenomenon in New York City.
