= The Learning Station =

American children's musical group

- Origin: Melbourne, Florida, United States
- Genre: Children's music
- Years active: 1987–present
- Labels: Hug-A-Chug Records, Hug-A-Chug Books and Don Monopoli Productions (United States)
- Members: Don Monopoli; Jan Hrkach
- Past members: Laurie Monopoli
- Website: http://www.LearningStationMusic.com/

The Learning Station is an American educational children's musical group, comprising the husband-and-wife team of Don Monopoli and Laurie Monopoli, with Jan Hrkach.

== History and music career ==
Couple Laurie and Don Monopoli founded the group in Connecticut before moving to Melbourne, Florida in the late 1980s. At that time, Hrkach, who also partnered with Monopoli in a Brevard County recording studio, joined the group. The group has released several albums for years, and performed across the US. Group member Laurie Monopoli has an early childhood education degree, and develops the educational content of their concerts and recordings.

Laurie Monopoli passed away on July 24, 2026.

== Releases ==
=== CDs ===
- Children Love to Sing and Dance (1987, re-released in 2001)
- Singing, Moving and Fun (1987, re-released in 2001)
- A Children's Christmas (1988)
- Play to Rest (1988, re-released in 2000)
- All-Time Children's Favorites (1993, 1999)
- Tony Chestnut & Fun Time Action Songs (1997)
- Rock 'N' Roll Songs That Teach (1997)
- Here We Go Loopty Loo (1998)
- Sift and Splash (1999)
- Physical Ed (2000)
- Seasonal Songs in Motion (2001)
- Get Funky and Musical Fun (2003)
- La Di Da, La Di Di, Dance With Me (2004)
- Literacy in Motion (2005)
- You Can Dance! (2007)
- Brain Boogie Boosters (2008)
- Kid's Country Song & Dance (2009)
- Children's Favorite Autumn Songs & Fingerplays (2011)
- #1 Best Kid's Songs! (2011)
- Action! Fun! Dance! (2012)
- Preschool Learning Fun (2012)
- Brain Breaks Action Songs: Let's Move! (2014)
- Nursery Rhymes with The Learning Station (2015)
- Baby Shark and Festive Tunes (2020)
- A Bunch of Celebration Songs For Kids (2020)

=== Videos and DVDs ===
- All Aboard With The Learning Station (1990)
- Movin' and Groovin' (2000)
- Physical Ed (2001)
- It's Showtime! (2002)
- Brain Breaks Action Songs Vids for Kids (Volume 1)
- Brain Breaks Action Songs Vids for Kids (Volume 2)
- Brain Breaks Action Songs Vids for Kids (Volume 3)
- Brain Breaks Action Songs Vids for Kids (Volume 4)
- Music and Movement for Kids (2017)

=== DVDs and Blu-rays by 20th Century Fox/20th Century Studios ===
- Brain Breaks Action Songs Vids for Kids (Volume 5)
- Brain Breaks Action Songs Vids for Kids (Volume 6)

=== Books ===
- The Book About Tony Chestnut (2010)
