= Chicken Noodle Soup (Webstar and Young B song) =

DJ Webstar song

Single by Webstar and Young B featuring The Voice of Harlem

from the album Webstar Presents: Caught in the Web
- Released: September 12, 2006
- Recorded: 2006
- Genre: Crunk
- Length: 3:44 (album version); 3:21 (radio edit)
- Label: Scilla Hill, Universal Republic
- Songwriter: Young B
- Producer: Da Drizzle

Webstar singles chronology
"Chicken Noodle Soup" (2006)	"Uptown Harlem" (2008)

Young B singles chronology
"Chicken Noodle Soup" (2006)	"It Takes Two" (2008)

The Voice of Harlem singles chronology
"Chicken Noodle Soup" (2006)

Music video
- "Webstar, Young B - Chicken Noodle Soup ft. AG aka The Voice of Harlem" on YouTube

"Chicken Noodle Soup" is a song by American disc jockey DJ Webstar and rapper Young B. The song was released on September 12, 2006, as the lead single promoting Webstar's 2006 debut album Caught in the Web. The song was produced by Da Drizzle, born Jamal Christopher Reynolds, who was Dupree's uncle, and also featured rapper AG aka The Voice of Harlem. The viral dance accompanying the song was allegedly choreographed by Allie Bernard.

In September 2019, South Korean rapper J-Hope of boy band BTS released a sampled version of the song featuring American singer Becky G.

== Background ==
The composition is characterized by its sharp rhythmic dance claps, pronounced bassline of thumping 808 kick drums, and recurring ad-libs, all complemented by the presence of an air raid siren wailing in the background of the beat. The remix features rapper Trina with Webstar, Young B, and Voice of Harlem.

== Accompanying dance ==
"Chicken Noodle Soup" also has an accompanying viral dance. Originating in Harlem, the dance went viral in 2006 on YouTube.

The basic dance features exaggerated shuffling, which consists of arm swinging, and a pantomime of the song's lyrics. See Litefeet for more.

== Charts ==
Chart (2006)	Peak position
US Billboard Hot 100	45
US Hot R&B/Hip-Hop Songs (Billboard)	30
US Hot Rap Tracks (Billboard)	15
US Rhythmic Top 40 (Billboard)	30

== Certifications ==
Region	Certification	Certified units/sales
United States (RIAA) Mastertone	Gold	500,000^{*}
^{*} Sales figures based on certification alone.

== Release history ==
Region	Date	Format(s)	Label	Ref.
United States	September 12, 2006	Rhythmic contemporary radio	Universal Republic	
United States	October 16, 2006	Contemporary hit radio	Universal Republic	
