= Bianca Bonnie =

American rapper, singer, songwriter, and television personality

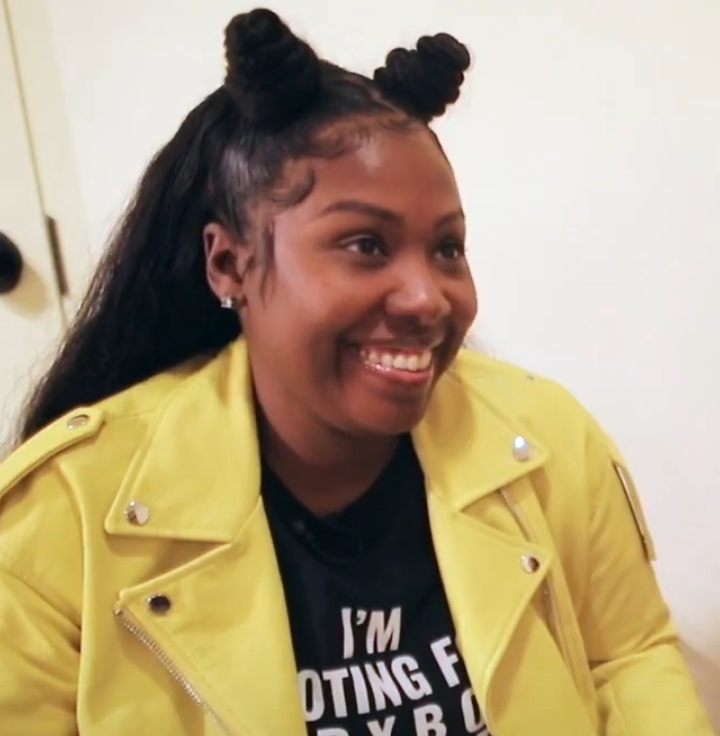
- Dupree in 2019

Background information
- Also known as: Young B
- Born: Bianca Dupree; Harlem, New York, U.S.
- Genres: Hip hop; R&B
- Occupations: Rapper; singer; songwriter; television personality
- Instrument: Vocals
- Years active: 2006–present
- Labels: Coke Boys; Para Music
- Website: bongod.com

Bianca Dupree, also known as Bianca Bonnie and formerly Young B, is an American rapper, singer, songwriter, and television personality. Born in Harlem, New York, she first gained recognition after being featured on Webstar's 2006 debut album Caught in the Web. The lead single "Chicken Noodle Soup" peaked at number 45 on the Billboard Hot 100 and became Dupree's signature song.

== Biography ==
Dupree is from Harlem, New York. At age 15, she created the 2006 "Chicken Noodle Soup" song with DJ Webstar, and her uncle Da Drizzle created the beat. The song and related dance became a viral hit on YouTube, and by October 2006, the song reached number 45 on the Billboard Hot 100 chart.

In 2015, Dupree joined the supporting cast of the VH1 reality television series alongside friends Cardi B and Mariahlynn on Love & Hip Hop: New York in season six. She was promoted to the main cast in the show's seventh and eighth seasons.

In 2017, she released visuals for her song "Faith In These Brownskins", a response to the line "All I got is faith in these lightskins" in the Summertime Shootout mixtape by Fabolous.

In September 2019, South Korean rapper J-Hope of boy band BTS released a remake of her song "Chicken Noodle Soup" with American singer Becky G.

In January 2020, she was featured on Marriage Boot Camp: Reality Stars with her partner Chozus. The couple have a son together on June 21, 2020.

== Discography ==
- The 9th Year (2016)
- 10 Plus (2018)
- 10 Plus Times 2 (2020)

== Filmography ==
Television

Year	Title	Role	Notes
2015–18	Love & Hip Hop: New York	Herself	Supporting Cast (Season 6); Main Cast (Seasons 7–8)
2020	Marriage Boot Camp: Hip Hop Edition	Herself	10 Episodes
2024	Coming Up Miami	Herself	Now That's TV Network
2024	Baddies Caribbean	Herself	Main Cast
