= Pancreatic Cancer Action Network =

U.S. non-profit organization

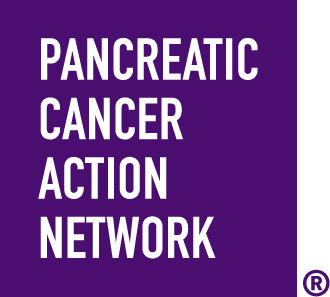
- Founded: February 8, 1999; 27 years ago
- Tax ID no.: 33-0841281
- Legal status: 501(c)(3) nonprofit organization
- Headquarters: Manhattan Beach, California, United States
- President, Chief Executive Officer: Julie Fleshman
- Chairman of the Board: Jeanne Weaver
- Revenue: $51,943,557 (2018)
- Expenses: $32,849,702 (2018)
- Employees: 150 (2018)
- Volunteers: 2,620 (2018)
- Website: www.pancan.org

The Pancreatic Cancer Action Network (PanCAN) is a United States–based 501(c)(3) charity that funds research, provides patient/caregiver support, conducts community outreach and advocates for increased federal research funding for those affected by pancreatic cancer.

In 2014, pancreatic cancer was projected to become the second leading cause of cancer-related death in the U.S. around 2030. As of 2026, it is the fourth, at 8% of all cancer deaths. While the incidence of pancreatic cancer has increased by about 1% per year since the late 1990s, the death rate stabilized in recent years. The organization established a goal, called the "Vision of Progress", to double pancreatic cancer survival by 2020. The nonprofit seeks to fulfill the goal by spreading greater awareness and increasing funds for research to improve the prevention, diagnosis and treatment of pancreatic cancer.

One way PanCAN raises awareness and funds is through the 5K walk/run event, PurpleStride. The events include more than 80,000 participants in nearly 60 communities in the United States, which are organized by local volunteer affiliates.

== History ==
The Pancreatic Cancer Action Network was founded in February 1999 by a group of survivors and caregivers including Pamela Acosta Marquardt, Paula Kim and Terry Lierman. Their first advocacy event, called "Inaugural One Voice Against Cancer", took place in Washington, D.C., in 2000. By 2002, the organization had created 40 volunteer affiliates across the U.S. In 2006, the first international affiliate started in Japan, and the Government Affairs & Advocacy office opened in Washington, D.C.

The Patient Central call center had helped 25,000 patients and caregivers by 2007. They formed the Deadliest Cancers Coalition in 2008 involving other professional organizations. In 2013, their PurpleStride 5K walk/run event raised over $10.5 million with almost 82,000 participants.

The organization initiated Know Your Tumor in 2014, a precision medicine service that uses molecular profiling to give doctors and their patients details about the biology of their tumor to help with treatment choices. In 2015, they launched the Clinical Trial Finder online resource with a directory of U.S. pancreatic cancer clinical trials. Precision Promise was announced in 2016 as the first precision medicine clinical trial to get new therapies to pancreatic cancer patients faster.

From 2008 to 2016, PanCAN's community events generated more than $87 million for the pancreatic cancer cause. The total research investment of the organization since 2003 is approximately $104 million to date.

PanCAN is headquartered in Manhattan Beach, California, and also staffs a Washington, D.C., and New York City office.

== Research ==
The Pancreatic Cancer Action Network funds grants for biomedical research in order to better understand the causes of pancreatic cancer and to advance its prevention, detection, treatment and cure. The organization offers grants for basic, translational and clinical research in pancreatic cancer to scientists and clinicians at various career levels.

PanCAN has awarded 174 grants to 170 scientists at 64 institutions with a cumulative projected research investment close to $104 million from 2003 to date, inclusive of their Research Grants Program and internal research initiatives.

The organization evaluated grants awarded from 2003 to 2015, which showed 122 grants given to 123 researchers, totaling over $28.2 million. The grantees leveraged the $28.2 million awarded by PanCAN into $311 million in subsequent funding to support their research. The 123 grantees evaluated authored 1,983 articles in peer-reviewed biomedical journals.

In addition to receiving financial support for their research projects, grantees participate in the organization's Community for Progress, which consists of researchers working together to accelerate scientific and medical advances.

PanCAN's Scientific and Medical Advisory Board is composed of leading cancer scientists, clinicians and healthcare professionals from institutions across the United States who specialize in pancreatic cancer. They provide scientific and clinical expertise to guide PanCAN in planning and implementing research initiatives, in-depth information and educational services for patients, their families and caregivers, as well as healthcare professionals.

== Advocacy ==
The Government Affairs & Advocacy office of the Pancreatic Cancer Action Network was established in Washington, D.C., in 2006. As a result of the office’s efforts, Dr. Randy Pausch testified in support of the cause and PanCAN in the House Appropriations Subcommittee on L-HHS in 2008 about the need for increased funding for pancreatic cancer research.

In 2008, thousands of supporters delivered nearly 19,000 communications to their federal legislators requesting greater research funding. The National Cancer Institutes (NCI) raised pancreatic cancer research funding from $73 million to $87 million.

Over 11,000 political supporters relayed more than 26,000 messages to their congressional lawmakers in 2009, getting the NCI another $70 million.

Around $135 million went to the NCI in 2010 as well because of the advocates’ actions, which was a major win since many federal programs were being downsized.

In 2011, the Department of Defense's Peer Reviewed Cancer Research Program (PRCRP) added pancreatic cancer. Approaching nearly $4 million, 12 research grants were dedicated to pancreatic cancer.

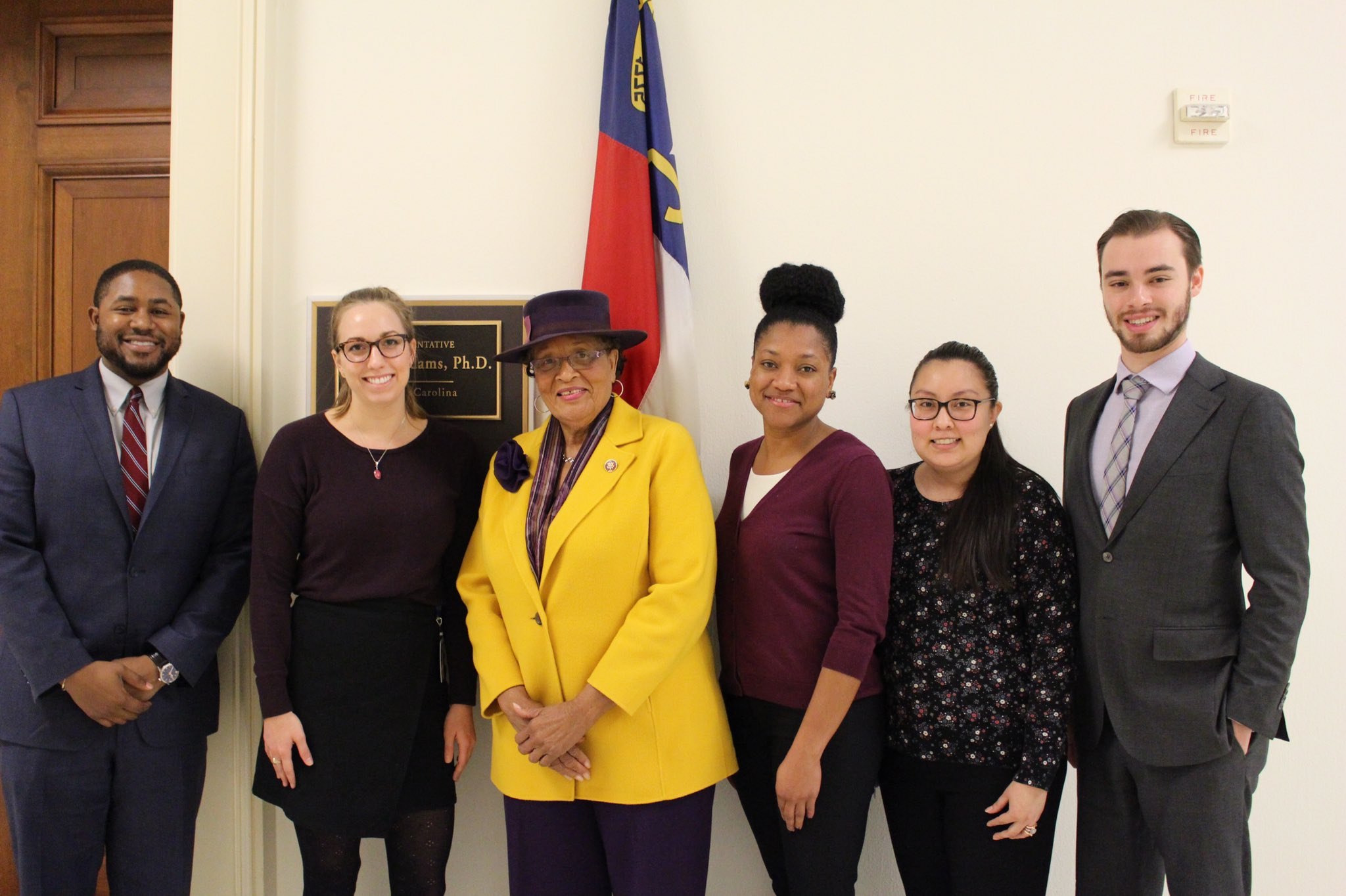
Congresswoman Alma Adams and her staff wearing purple in support of PanCAN in 2019

The passage of the Recalcitrant Cancer Research Act in 2012 called for the NCI to create a strategic plan for pancreatic and lung cancers.

From the founding of PanCAN in 1999 to 2013, NCI research funding for pancreatic cancer grew 500 percent, totaling over $100 million.

The 21st Century Cures Act passed in 2016, authorizing an additional $4.8 billion in new funding for the National Institutes of Health (NIH), with $1.8 billion for the National Cancer Moonshot Initiative.

In 2017, Congress approved the second $2 billion increase in a row for the NIH in FY17. Plus, $60 million in funding was approved for the Department of Defense's PRCRP, a $10 million increase over the previous fiscal year.

The year also included the 10th anniversary of PanCAN's annual advocacy event called, "National Pancreatic Cancer Advocacy Day" in Washington, D.C., with hundreds of attendees, including survivors and their families, meeting with legislators to ask them to increase federal funding for cancer research.

== Programs and Services ==
=== Patient Services ===
Formerly known as Patient and Liaison Services, and Patient Central, the call center offers free disease information and services that are personalized for caregivers, patients and healthcare professionals.

=== Know Your Tumor ===
The precision medicine service, initiated in 2014, uses molecular profiling to give doctors and their patients, who qualify for the program, details about the biology of their tumor to help select better treatment options.

=== Clinical Trial Finder ===
Launched in 2015, the free online resource offers patients, caregivers and healthcare professionals access to an extensive directory of U.S. pancreatic cancer clinical trials. The tool generates a number of trials that fit a patient's requirements.

=== Patient Registry ===
Developed in 2016, the online directory collects patient experiences to show similarities in the pancreatic cancer journey to advance researcher knowledge about the disease and improve patient therapies.

=== Precision Promise ===
The initiative began in 2016 as the first precision medicine clinical trial to get new therapies to pancreatic cancer patients faster.

=== Survivor & Caregiver Network ===
The program consists of survivors and caregivers who volunteer across the U.S. to speak with patients, caregivers, family members or friends about the disease.

== Community events and volunteer network ==
PanCAN has raised over $87 million for the pancreatic cancer cause through community events from 2008 to 2016.

=== PurpleStride ===
The Pancreatic Cancer Action Network's main fundraising event is a 5K walk/run called PurpleStride. As of 2017, the events have involved around 80,000 people in nearly 60 communities across the United States. PurpleStride contributors raised $11.8 million in 2017.

=== Volunteer Affiliates ===
PanCAN's network of volunteer affiliates organize community events, build relationships with local media and meet with elected officials and businesses to spread awareness and raise funds. 58 affiliates across the U.S. were in operation in 2017.

=== Wage Hope My Way ===
PanCAN's do-it-yourself (DIY) fundraising program is for individuals to host personal events in support of the cause. Nearly $1.3 million was raised in 2017.

== Partners ==
=== World Pancreatic Cancer Coalition ===
In 2013, international patient advocacy organizations focused on pancreatic cancer gathered to consider collaborating to raise awareness worldwide about the disease and supporting the work of one another.

In 2016, the World Pancreatic Cancer Coalition started with over 40 organizations from more than 20 countries. They currently host over 70 member organizations from more than 30 countries. PanCAN president and CEO Julie Fleshman serves as chair of the World Pancreatic Cancer Coalition Steering Committee.

=== Deadliest Cancers Coalition ===
The Deadliest Cancers Coalition was founded by the Pancreatic Cancer Action Network in 2008. It is a consortium of patient advocacy organizations and professional societies from across the United States dedicated to resolving issues of policies involving the nation’s most lethal, or recalcitrant, cancers, which have five-year relative survival rates below 50 percent.

== Ratings and financials ==
2018 marked the 14th consecutive year the Pancreatic Cancer Action Network earned the highest four-star rating from Charity Navigator, the leading charity evaluator in the United States.

Based on the Pancreatic Cancer Action Network’s IRS 990 form for FY2018, the organization posted revenue of $51,943,557.

== Staff ==
In 2018, the president and chief executive officer of the organization was Julie Fleshman.
