= DJ Webstar =

American rapper (born 1986)

Webstar
- Also known as: DJ Webstar
- Born: Troy Ryan; October 25, 1986 (age 39)
- Origin: Harlem, New York City, U.S.
- Genres: East Coast hip-hop
- Occupations: Disc jockey; rapper; record producer
- Years active: 2006–2010
- Labels: Scrilla Hill; SRC; E1; Universal Republic

Troy Ryan (born October 25, 1986), better known by his stage name DJ Webstar (or simply Webstar) is an American DJ and record producer. He is best known for his 2006 single "Chicken Noodle Soup", which became a viral hit online before entering the Billboard Hot 100. The song's popularity led him to sign with the now-defunct Universal Republic Records, although the label issued no further releases from Webstar.

== Discography ==
=== Albums ===
Album information
Webstar Presents: Caught in the Web
- Released: September 26, 2006
- Label: Scrilla Hill
- Singles: "Chicken Noodle Soup"
Uptown Harlem
- Released: August 2, 2008
- Label: Scrilla Hill
- Singles: "Uptown Harlem"
The Rooftop
- With: Jim Jones
- Released: October 6, 2009
- Label: Scrilla Hill
- Singles: "Dancin On Me"

=== Singles ===
List of singles, with selected chart positions, showing year released and album name
Title	Year	Peak chart positions			Certifications	Album
Title	Year	US	US R&B	US Rap	Certifications	Album
"Chicken Noodle Soup" (featuring Young B and The Voice of Harlem)	2006	45	30	15	RIAA: Gold	Webstar Presents: Caught in the Web
"Dancin on Me" (with Jim Jones, featuring Juelz Santana)	2009	104	48	19		The Rooftop
"Tipsy" (featuring Serani and Jadakiss)	2010	—	—	—		Non-album single
"—" denotes a title that did not chart, or was not released in that territory.

=== Guest appearances ===
List of non-single guest appearances, with other performing artists, showing year released and album name
Title	Year	Other performer(s)	Album
"Skatez On"	2007	Lumidee, Boogie Black, Ron Browz	The Queen of Spanish Harlem
"Get Ya Bounce On"	2009	Large Amount, A.P., Bully	No Security
"Club Jam Packed"	2010	Sheek Louch	Donnie G: Don Gorilla
