= YrkDaRapper =

American hip-hop musician (born 1998)

Brennan Thomas Martin (born January 5, 1998), known professionally as YrkDaRapper, is a hip-hop artist, songwriter and record producer based in Neptune, New Jersey. He released his debut album Boss in the Kitchen in 2018 and has collaborated with Dre Hill, Tafia and OG Cuicide.

== Music career ==
YrkDaRapper interest in music started during his high school days at Blue Lite Studio in Mount Holly, New Jersey where he attended summer music camp. He was influenced by artists such as Meek Mill, 2Pac, Fetty Wap, Arsonal Da Rebel, Albee Al and Mariahlynn. In 2018, he released his first single Rip Dad and his ten-track debut album Boss in the Kitchen. He released his extended play (EP) Life of Yrk and his sophomore album Life of Yrk2 in 2019. YrkDaRapper has collaborated with Dre Hill, Tafia and OG Cuicide. In February 2024, he released a single Grind with OG Cuicide.
