= Scottie Beam =

American media personality and model (born 1990)

- Born: Deanii Andrea Scott; October 3, 1990 (age 36); Bronx, New York, NY, US
- Occupations: Media personality; model; podcaster
- Known for: Hot 97, State of the Culture
- Notable work: Black Girl Podcast
- Family: Shaila Scott (mother)

Deanii Andrea Scott (pronounced /diɒni/ dee-AH-nee; born October 3, 1990), known professionally as Scottie Beam, is an American media personality, model, and podcaster. She is best known as a former producer at Hot 97, where she worked for ten years, and as a former co-host on State of the Culture. She previously co-hosted the podcasts Black Girl Podcast and Okay, Now Listen.

== Early life ==
Deanii Scott was born and raised in the Bronx, New York. Her mother, Shaila Scott, has been a DJ for 107.5 WBLS for decades.

== Career ==
Scottie Beam began her radio career first working for KISS FM's street team, and then at Hot 97. She attended Clark Atlanta University but soon dropped out and returned to New York to pursue a career in music.

Scottie worked as digital producer for Columbia Records and then returned to Hot 97 to produce first for Angie Martinez and then for Ebro in the Morning. After ten years at Hot 97, she then took a role as co-host for Revolt TV's State of the Culture and left in 2019.

She has worked as a model for brands such as Nike, Foot Locker, and The North Face. She has spoken on issues related to black women, such as colorism.

In 2017, Scottie began co-hosting a podcast with four other women (Rebecca "Bex" Francois, Sapphira Martin, Alysha Pamphile, and Gia Peppers), all of whom used to work for Hot 97. Black Girl Podcast focuses on pop culture and issues relevant to young women in the professional world.

In July 2017, she tweeted about being physically attacked by a security guard at Queen's Knockdown Center.

She hosted the 2019 Netflix special Rhythm + Flow:The Aftershow.

In April 2020, it was announced that Scottie would co-host a bi-weekly podcast with BuzzFeed journalist Sylvia Obell called Okay, Now Listen, sponsored by Netflix's Strong Black Lead initiative. The podcast is described as "two Black women discuss[ing] what they're dealing with at any given moment — from belting out gospel to speaking candidly about sex — with a firmly Black cultural frame of reference." The podcast is produced in conjunction with Pineapple Street Studios. The show ended production in July 2022.

As of July 2023 Scottie is co-hosting her second podcast with Sylvia Obell, The Scottie and Sylvia Show, produced by Issa Rae's production company Raedio.

In 2024 she and Desus Nice began co-hosting a podcast called Bet! produced by DraftKings and HartBeat.

== Awards and nominations ==
- 2022 – Nominee, Webby Award for Culture & Lifestyle Campaigns (for Get You A Me)

== Filmography ==
=== Television ===
Year	Title	Role	Notes
2014	This Is Hot 97	Herself	Episode: "Gutter Ball"
2018	Open Late with Peter Rosenberg	Herself	2 episodes
2018-19	State of the Culture	Herself	Main cast: Season 1
2019	Love & Hip Hop	Herself	Episode: "Hard Choices"
2021	Get You A Me	Herself	Web series
