= Shaila Scott =

American radio personality

Shaila Scott is an American radio personality.

== Career ==
A native New Yorker from Harlem, she has worked in New York radio for 30 years as of 2018. Scott is currently a midday on-air radio personalities for WBLS 107.5 FM. Scott graduated Buffalo State College with a B.A in radio and television in 1985. Her first job was as an on-air personality for WBLK in Buffalo where she worked for four years, followed by six years at WBLS. She joined 98.7 KISS FM in New York City in 1994 as the first hostess of love show Kissing After Dark and co-host to Jeff Foxx, Talent and Bob Slade of the 98.7 KISS FM morning show, The Wake Up Club for 5 years. In 2010 Scott and Fred Buggs received the Excellence In Radio Broadcast Journalism Award. Following the closure of KISS FM, she re-joined the WBLS team in April 2012.

== Personal life ==
She is the mother of media personality and model Scottie Beam.
