= List of Love & Hip Hop: New York cast members =

Love & Hip Hop: New York (originally titled Love & Hip Hop) is the original installment of the Love & Hip Hop reality television franchise on VH1. The series premiered on March 6, 2011, and chronicles the lives of people involved with hip hop music in New York City (and nearby areas, including New Jersey, and Yonkers).

T has a large ensemble cast, with leading cast members in the opening credits, and a sprawling supporting cast, who are credited as "additional cast" or "featured" in the show's end credits. These secondary cast members appear in green screen confessional segments and (for the most part) have the same amount of screen time and storyline focus as the show's main cast members. Over the years, several supporting cast members have been upgraded to lead.

== Cast timeline ==
Main cast (appears in opening credits)
Secondary cast (appears in green screen confessional segments and in end credits alongside the main cast)
Guest cast (appears in a guest role or cameo)

Main cast members
Cast member	Seasons									
Cast member	1	2	3	4	5	6	7	8	9	10
Chrissy Lampkin	Starring									Starring
Emily Bustamante	Starring									
Olivia Longott	Starring		Supporting							Supporting
Somaya Reece	Starring							Guest (Note: Appears in the Love & Hip Hop New York: Dirty Little Secrets special only.)		Supporting
Kimbella Vanderhee		Starring	Guest		Guest		Starring	Guest (Note: Appears in the Love & Hip Hop New York: Dirty Little Secrets and Love & Hip Hop: The Love Edition specials only.)	Starring	
Yandy Smith-Harris	Cameo	Starring								
Erica Mena		Supporting	Starring					Guest		Starring
Jen the Pen			Starring							
Raqi Thunda			Starring							
Winter Ramos		Guest	Starring							
Rashidah Ali			Starring	Guest	Supporting					
Tahiry Jose			Starring					Guest		Supporting
Tara Wallace				Starring			Supporting	Cameo		
Erica Jean				Starring						
Amina Buddafly				Starring			Supporting			Guest
K. Michelle				Starring	Guest (Note: Appears in the Love & Hip Hop Live: The Wedding special only.)					
Cyn Santana				Supporting	Starring				Starring	
Chrissy Monroe					Starring					
Cardi B						Starring				
Miss Moe Money & Sexxy Lexxy						Starring				
Mariahlynn						Starring			Supporting	Cameo
Remy Ma						Starring				
Bianca Bonnie						Supporting	Starring			
Felicia "Snoop" Pearson							Starring			
Juju C.						Cameo	Supporting	Starring		Supporting
Anaís								Starring	Supporting	Cameo
Lil' Mo								Starring		
Papoose						Supporting			Starring	
Joe Budden			Supporting						Starring	
Juelz Santana	Cameo	Guest			Guest	Guest (Note: Appears in a bonus scene only.)	Supporting		Starring	Guest (Note: As Juelz was incarcerated during the filming of this season, he appears only via phone call conversations with Kimbella.)
Rich Dollaz	Supporting								Starring	
Safaree Samuels								Supporting	Starring	
Supporting cast members
Cast member	Seasons									
Cast member	1	2	3	4	5	6	7	8	9	10
Jim Jones	Supporting									Supporting
Mashonda Tifrere	Supporting									
Maurice Aguilar	Supporting									
Nancy "Mama" Jones	Supporting				Guest					Supporting
Teairra Marí		Supporting								
Mendeecees Harris			Supporting	Guest (Note: As Mendeecees was incarcerated during the filming of this season, he appears only via phone call conversations with Yandy and other cast members.)	Supporting		Guest			
Consequence			Supporting							
Lore'l			Supporting							
Kaylin Garcia			Supporting							
Peter Gunz			Guest	Supporting				Guest		Supporting
Nya Lee				Supporting					Supporting	
Saigon				Supporting						
Diamond Strawberry					Supporting					
Cisco Rosado			Guest	Cameo	Supporting			Guest		Supporting
Chink Santana					Supporting					
Precious Paris					Supporting					
Jhonni Blaze					Supporting			Guest		
DJ Self		Cameo				Supporting				
Yorma Hernandez						Supporting				
Rose						Supporting				
Hennessy Carolina						Guest	Supporting			
Samantha Wallace					Guest		Supporting			
J. Adrienne							Supporting			
Swift Star							Supporting			
DJ Drewski							Supporting			Guest
Sofi Green							Supporting			
Sky Landish							Supporting			Cameo
Kim Wallace					Guest		Supporting			
Erika DeShazo						Guest	Supporting			
Judy Harris					Guest		Supporting			Guest
Asia Davies							Supporting			
Ashley Trowers						Guest	Supporting		Guest	
Jade Wifey							Supporting			
Moniece Slaughter					Guest		Supporting	Guest (Note: Appears in the Love & Hip Hop: The Love Edition special only.)		
Major Galore							Supporting			
Navarro Gray								Supporting	Guest	
Brittney Taylor								Supporting		
Jaquáe								Supporting		
Jonathan Fernandez		Cameo						Supporting		
James R.							Cameo	Supporting		
Ashley Diaz								Supporting		
DreamDoll								Supporting		
Sophia Body								Supporting		
Karl Dargan								Supporting		
Grafh				Cameo				Supporting		
Ayisha Diaz								Supporting		
Trent Crews								Supporting		
Kiyanne								Supporting		
Alexis Skyy									Supporting	
Maino		Guest				Guest			Supporting	
Sidney Starr									Supporting	
Maggie Carrie									Supporting	
Phresher										Supporting
Jennaske										Supporting
Jenn Coreano										Supporting

== Main cast members ==
=== Original cast members ===
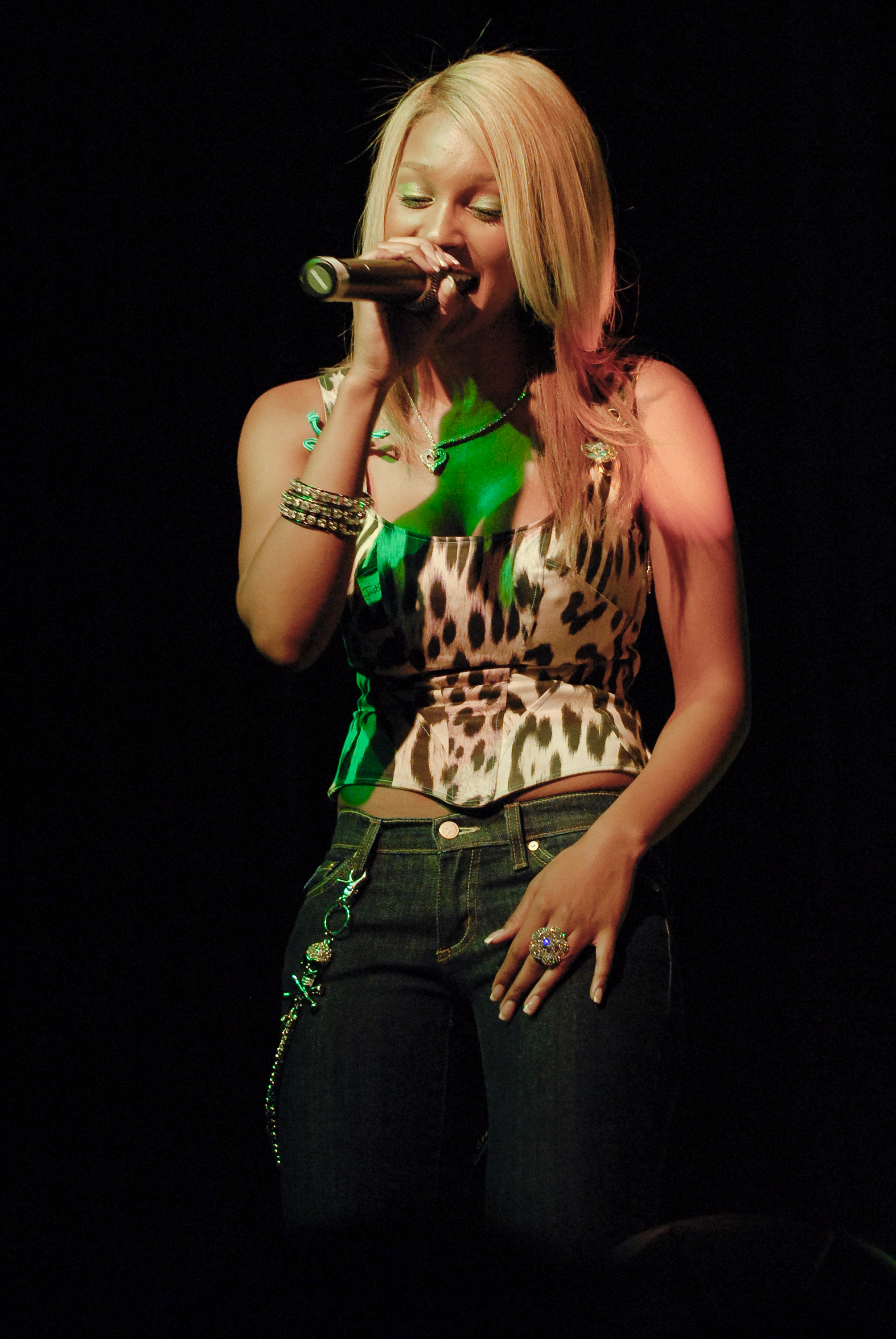
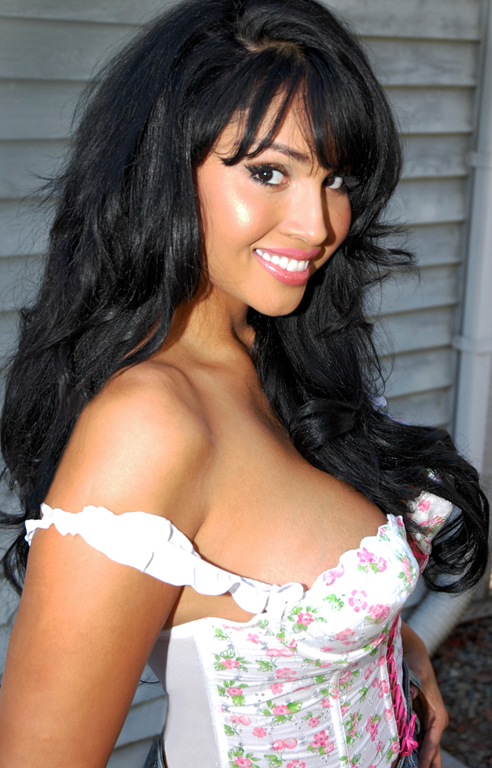
Olivia and Somaya Reece are original cast members on Love & Hip Hop.
- Chrissy Lampkin (Seasons 1–2, 10) is the longtime girlfriend of rapper Jim Jones. She was born in Harlem to Afro-Cuban parents. She has been in a relationship with Jim since 2004, after meeting him in Miami. Chrissy first appeared in the 2006 presentation tape for Keeping Up the Joneses, a proposed doco-series that would attempt to chronicle Jim's everyday life, as well as the behind-the-scenes difficulties in actually making the documentary. While in development with VH1 under the title Diary of a Hip Hop Girlfriend, the show's focus shifted to Chrissy and her circle of friends, forming the basis of what would eventually become Love & Hip Hop. The first season of Love & Hip Hop chronicles her struggles with Jim's commitment issues, and her strained relationship with his mother, Nancy. Midway through the season, Chrissy proposes to Jim and the two become engaged. Her feud with Jim's long-term manager Yandy becomes the focus of season two, culminating in a violent showdown between the two women at a Miami nightclub. After this incident, Chrissy's relationship with the show's producers grew tense, with her refusing to sit down with executive producer Mona Scott-Young for the season's reunion special, accusing her of manipulating storylines for dramatic effect. On September 7, 2012, VH1 announced that Jim and Chrissy would leave Love & Hip Hop to star in their own spin-off show Chrissy & Mr. Jones, which premiered on September 24, 2012. The series chronicled the couple's relationship struggles, as well as Chrissy's forays into fashion and interior design. Its series finale aired on December 16, 2013, after two seasons. After a six-year hiatus from the franchise, and several years spent living in Miami, Chrissy returned to New York and rejoined the cast of Love & Hip Hop: New York for its tenth season. During the season, she reignites her feud with Yandy after making peace with Kimbella.
- Emily Bustamante (Seasons 1–2), also known as Emily B, is a stylist and fashion designer. She was born in New York City to Puerto Rican-Dominican parents, and raised in Norfolk, Virginia. She has been in an on-again, off-again relationship with the rapper Fabolous since 2001 and is the mother of his son, Johan Jackson, born 2008. She also has a daughter, Taina Williams, born 1998, from a previous relationship. The first two seasons of Love & Hip Hop chronicle her struggles with Fabolous' infidelity and his refusal to claim her in public. Emily did not return to the show after the second season's reunion special, instead going on to appear in a supporting role in the spin-off Chrissy & Mr. Jones for two seasons. In 2015, Emily gave birth to Fab's second son, Jonas Jackson. In March 2018, the couple made headlines after a violent incident occurred in which Fab allegedly knocked out her two front teeth. In 2019, Emily was reportedly in talks to appear with the other original cast members for season ten of Love & Hip Hop: New York, however she ultimately did not appear.
- Olivia Longott (Seasons 1–2, supporting cast member in seasons 3, 10) is a R&B singer-songwriter. She was born in Brooklyn, New York to a Jamaican mother and Indian-Cuban father. She rose to fame as the "First Lady" of G-Unit, as the first female signed to G-Unit Records. The first two seasons of Love & Hip Hop chronicle her struggles to comeback in the music industry after a series of career misfires. As the show aired, Olivia was publicly critical of her portrayal, most notably regarding a storyline involving her relationship with her mother. Subsequently, her role was diminished significantly, returning only as a supporting cast member in season three. During the season, she becomes caught up in the relationship drama between her manager Rich Dollaz, and his new artist Erica Mena. After a seven-year hiatus, Olivia returned to the show as a supporting cast member in season ten, in which she accuses Rich of stealing song royalties from her.
- Somaya Reece (Seasons 1–2, supporting cast member in season 10), born Ginie Castro, is a Salvadoran-Puerto Rican artist, originally from South Central, Los Angeles. She endured a rough childhood, including an abusive relationship with a teenage boyfriend, and a stint in a gang where she was stabbed and shot two times. She rose to fame as an urban model and through her relationship with rapper Joe Budden, who she dated in 2009. The first season of Love & Hip Hop chronicles her move to New York City and her struggles to kickstart her music career. During the season, she ignites a feud with Chrissy after pursuing Jim for a musical collaboration, and with her manager Maurice gets into a war of words with Olivia and her manager Rich. In season two, Somaya was phased gradually out of the show, with the finale showing her packing her bags and moving back to Los Angeles. During the season's reunion special, she confronts series creator Mona Scott-Young over having her storyline cut out, memorably calling her a "bitch". Somaya then made uncredited cameo appearances in the first season of the spin-off Chrissy & Mr. Jones, where she is seen attending Chrissy, Emily and Talia's fashion show, and in season two of Love & Hip Hop: Hollywood, where she is seen attending Nikki, Princess and Milan's fashion event. Somaya officially returned to the franchise in the special Love & Hip Hop New York: Dirty Little Secrets to discuss her time on the show, the only original cast member to do so. She reportedly filmed scenes with her then-girlfriend Lady Luck for the show's eighth season, however their scenes never made it to air. After an eight-year hiatus, Somaya returned to Love & Hip Hop: New York as a supporting cast member in season ten.

=== Season 2 additions ===
- Kimbella James (née Vanderhee), (Seasons 2, 7, 9–10, guest star in seasons 3, 5) is a biracial urban model and video vixen, originally from Miami, Florida. She has been in an on-again, off-again relationship with Juelz Santana since 2009 and is the mother of his son, Juelz Santana James, born 2010. She also has a son, Leandro, born 2002, from a previous relationship. Kimbella joins the main cast of Love & Hip Hop from season two. In the premiere episode, she admits to having sex with Fabolous while Emily was pregnant with his child, igniting a violent altercation with Emily's friend Chrissy. Later in the season, she gets into an ugly brawl with Erica Mena, stemming from their modelling days together. After the season's reunion special, Kimbella quit the series, after revealing that she is pregnant with Juelz' second child. She gave birth to Bella Monroe James in 2012. Kimbella returns as Yandy's friend and confidante in guest appearances during seasons three and five, and as a bridesmaid at Yandy and Mendeecees' wedding in the special Love & Hip Hop Live: The Wedding. She rejoins the main cast in season seven, which chronicles her relationship with Juelz as he embarks on a career comeback. She quit the show for a second time while filming season eight after falling out with Yandy, appearing only in the specials Love & Hip Hop New York: Dirty Little Secrets and Love & Hip Hop: The Love Edition. Kimbella and Juelz rejoin the cast together in season nine, which chronicles their struggles as a couple, after Juelz faces jail time for bringing a loaded gun to Newark Airport. During the season, she reveals that Juelz has struggled with opiate addiction for many years. Later, he proposes and the two become engaged. They marry in the season's finale. During the reunion, Kimbella reveals that she is pregnant with the couple's third child (and Kimbella's fourth). She gave birth to Santana James in 2019. Kimbella returns in season ten, which chronicles her attempts to adjust to life while Juelz is incarcerated, amid ongoing tensions with Yandy after her reconciliation with Chrissy.
- Yandy Smith-Harris (Seasons 2–10, cameo appearance in season 1) is an entertainment manager and entrepreneur. She was born in Harlem. In 2004, she graduated from Howard University with a bachelor's degree in business and interned at Violator under the mentorship of Mona Scott-Young. In 2005, Yandy met Jim Jones on a private jet charted by Russell Simmons, and left Violator to manage him full-time. In 2006, Jim approached VH1 executives to make a reality show about him, leading to the filming of an 11-minute presentation tape, Keeping Up with Joneses, produced by Stefan Springman and Toby Barraud of Eastern TV. VH1 were unsure if audiences would be invested in the concept full-time, and Yandy approached Mona to retool the show, and the concept was tweaked to include Jim's girlfriend Chrissy and her circle of friends, becoming what would be later known as Love & Hip Hop. Yandy first appears briefly in an uncredited cameo at Chrissy's proposal party in the first season, before joining the main cast from season two. The season chronicles her struggles while working as Jim's manager and the demise of their professional relationship, culminating in a violent brawl with Chrissy at a Miami nightclub. In July 2012, Yandy gave birth to her first child, Omere Harris. Season three introduces Mendeecees Harris, her child's father and on-again, off-again boyfriend since 2007, and chronicles their engagement and subsequent wedding plans, which are interrupted when Mendeecees is forced to turn himself into custody for multiple drug and trafficking charges. The couple are reunited in season five when Mendeecees is released on bail, and Yandy gives birth to their second child, Skylar Smith Harris, in 2015. On May 25, 2015, Yandy and Mendeecees were married live on VH1 as part of the special Love & Hip Hop Live: The Wedding. While filming the show's sixth season, Mendeecees is sentenced to eight years in jail and turns himself in. Season seven chronicles Yandy's strained relationships with Mendeecees' baby mamas, Samantha and Erika, which explodes into an all-out war, as the women fight for custody for Mendeecees' eldest children, Lil Mendeecees and Aasim. During the season, Yandy admits that her televised wedding was "symbolic" and that her marriage to Mendeecees is not legal. Later seasons chronicle Yandy's struggles to repair her broken friendship with Kimbella, having had a falling out behind the scenes in season eight. Their feud intensifies in season nine, when Yandy begins the process of adopting a foster child, Infinity, and Kimbella questions her motivations for doing so, claiming it was all for "clout". In season ten, Yandy and Kimbella are once again at each other's throats, after Yandy's nemesis Chrissy returns to New York and reconciles with Kimbella. Later, she prepares for Mendeecees' upcoming release from federal prison. After Mendeecees' release in January 2020, the couple moved to Atlanta and joined the cast of Love & Hip Hop: Atlanta. Yandy also appears in VH1 Family Reunion: Love & Hip Hop Edition, as a guest star in the spin-off show Remy & Papoose: Meet the Mackies and in the specials 40 Greatest Love & Hip Hop Moments, Dirty Little Secrets, The Love Edition, Love & Hip Hop Awards: Most Certified and 40 Greatest Love & Hip Hop Moments: The Reboot.

=== Season 3 additions ===
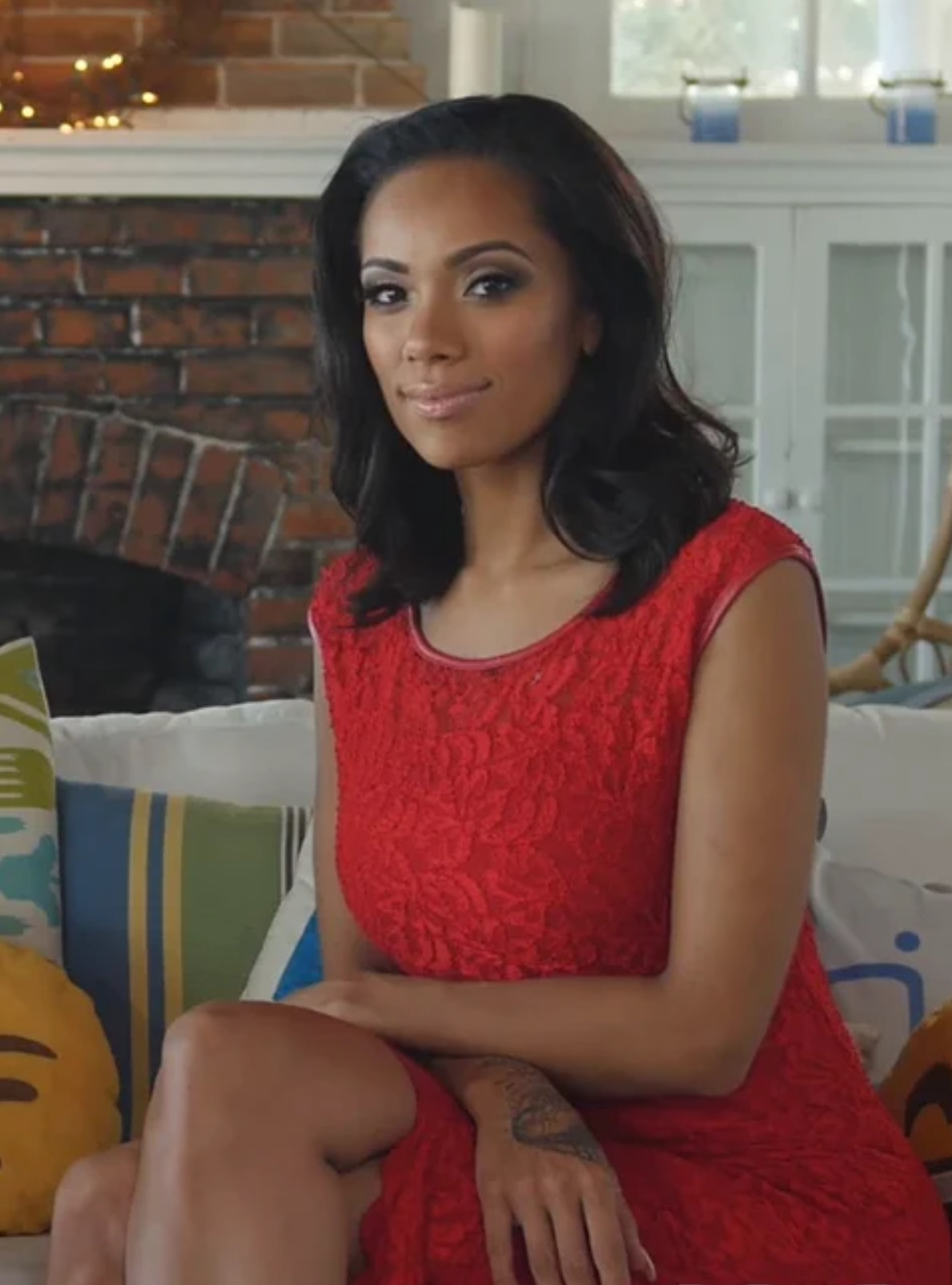
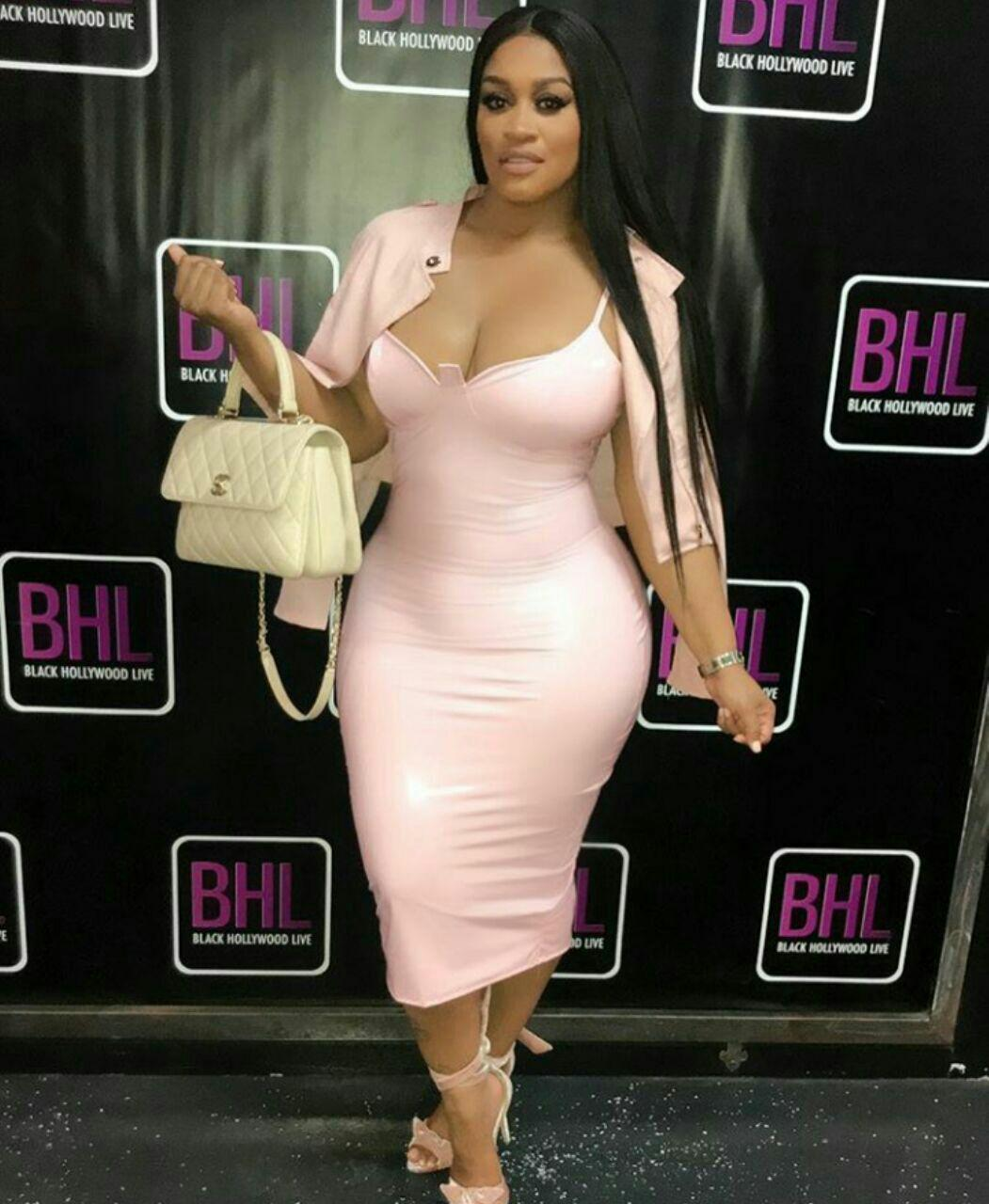
Erica Mena and Rashidah Ali join the main cast of Love & Hip Hop: New York in season three.
- Erica Mena (Seasons 3–5, 10, supporting cast member in season 2) is a former video vixen, urban model and aspiring singer, known through her appearances in various hip hop music videos, for artists such as Chris Brown, Fabolous, Akon and Fat Joe. She was born in The Bronx to a Puerto Rican mother and Dominican father. She has a son, King Conde, born 2007, with video director and rapper Raul Conde, a member of Fat Joe's Terror Squad. In 2009, she appeared as a troublemaking Dash employee on the E! reality show Kourtney and Khloé Take Miami. Erica first appears in a supporting role in season two as a rival of Kimbella's, which stems from their days competing for modelling jobs. In her first episode, the two get into a violent altercation in which champagne glasses are thrown, causing both to bleed. This would lead to stronger security measures for all Love & Hip Hop shows from then on, including hiring personal bodyguards for the cast and enforcing a total ban on glass and metal silverware on set. Erica is promoted to the main cast in season three, which focuses on her turbulent relationship with manager Rich Dollaz and his struggles to kickstart her music career. In season four, Erica explores her bisexuality, entering a relationship with model Cyn Santana. Their relationship falls apart in season five and Erica finds love with rapper Bow Wow, who later proposes. During the season's reunion special, Erica refused to film onstage with the other cast members, announcing that the season would be her last. Just months after she quit the series, Erica and Bow Wow called off their engagement. Erica returned to the franchise two years later in 2017, first appearing in the special Love & Hip Hop New York: Dirty Little Secrets, and then joining the cast of Love & Hip Hop: Atlanta, having relocating to Atlanta to kickstart her music career. On December 24, 2018, Erica announced her engagement to fellow Love & Hip Hop cast member Safaree Samuels. The two met while appearing as contestants on VH1's Scared Famous, where they tied at third place. Although she does not appear onscreen (and any images of her are blurred), her relationship with Safaree becomes a source of conflict with the show's cast towards the end of season nine. In 2019, Erica returned to Love & Hip Hop: New York for its tenth anniversary season, after announcing that her and Safaree are expecting their first child together. The season chronicles their wedding and subsequent marriage struggles, as well as her unresolved issues with exes Rich and Cyn Santana. Erica also appears in the special 40 Greatest Love & Hip Hop Moments: The Reboot.
- Jen Bayer (Season 3), known as Jen "the Pen", is a radio personality and hip hop music blogger. She was born on Staten Island. In 2005, she appeared on the BET reality show Ultimate Hustler, hosted by Damon Dash, who coined her nickname. She has been in a relationship with rapper Consequence since 2008 and is the mother of his son, Caiden Mills, born 2011. Season three chronicles her struggles as a Christian in an interfaith relationship with a Muslim. During the season, she sparked controversy and criticism for saying "I'm white, honey, it will get done" during an argument with fellow cast member Raqi.
- Raqi Thunda (Season 3) is a radio personality and self-proclaimed "hip hop confidante". She was born in Miami, Florida to a Puerto Rican and Algerian father, who was also Muslim. She is introduced as Joe Budden's close friend, however they have a dramatic falling out early into the season. She later sparks violent feuds with Tahiry, Jen and Rashidah.
- Winter Ramos (Season 3, guest star in Season 2), is an author and former groupie, known for her hip hop exposé, Game Over: My Love for Hip-Hop. She was born in Brooklyn to Puerto Rican parents. She worked for many years in the industry as a wardrobe stylist and executive assistant to rappers such as Fabolous. She first appears as a guest star in season two, helping Emily through her relationship struggles with Fab, before joining the main cast in season three. Her storyline revolves around her feud with rapper Lore'l, who has a problem with what Winter wrote about her in her book. Winter was phased gradually out of the show during the season, making a brief appearance at the season's reunion special, where she reveals she is pregnant. Winter gave birth to a daughter, Summer Marie, in 2013.
- Rashidah Ali (Season 3, supporting cast member in seasons 5–6, guest star in season 4), also credited as Rah Ali, is a socialite, entrepreneur and self-professed celebrity "stiletto expert". She was born in The Bronx and raised Muslim. Her "high-end" shoe boutiques in New York and Atlanta have been featured on the reality shows Keeping Up with the Kardashians, The Real Housewives of Atlanta and Basketball Wives. Rah joins the cast in season three, which chronicles her legal issues, including being charged for slashing a bouncer's face with a razor blade. She also reveals she had sex with Yandy's boyfriend Mendeecees years earlier, sparking a rivalry between the two women. At the season's reunion, she announces her engagement to her long-term boyfriend, a music executive. Rah was demoted after the season's poor reception, returning as a guest star in season four, which chronicles the breakdown of her friendship with Tahiry as she plans her wedding. She begins appearing in a supporting capacity towards the end of season five, before taking on a larger role again in season six, where she appears as Remy Ma's friend and confidante, and embarks on a management career, managing the careers of rapper rivals BBOD and Mariahlynn. Rah does not return to the show after the sixth season's reunion special, reportedly after falling out with Remy. In 2016, she made a memorable appearance on the VH1 show Black Ink Crew, where she got into a brawl with Sky. Since 2017, Rah has garnered attention from tabloids and gossip blogs for her friendship with rapper Nicki Minaj, including being referenced in Nicki's diss track "No Frauds" and appearing in its music video, and getting into a much-publicised physical altercation with former co-star Cardi B at New York Fashion Week.
- Tahiry Jose (Seasons 3–4, supporting cast member in season 10) is an urban model and video vixen. She was born in Harlem to Dominican parents. She came into the public eye due to her relationship with rapper Joe Budden, who she dated from 2005 until 2009. Season three chronicles Tahiry and Joe's lingering feelings for each other, amid violent feuds with Raqi and Joe's girlfriend Kaylin. During the season, she embarks on a music career, releasing a single, "Devil", with producer Cisco Rosado. She and Joe eventually rekindle their relationship, however break up towards the end of season four, after Tahiry rejects his marriage proposal. Tahiry left the show while filming season five, believing "it was time to leave on top". Any scenes she filmed never made it to air. In 2017, she returned to the franchise in the specials Love & Hip Hop New York: Dirty Little Secrets and The Love Edition. Two years later, Tahiry returned to Love & Hip Hop: New York as a supporting cast member for the show's tenth anniversary season, where she reconnects with Joe, causing tensions between her and Cyn. Additionally, she experiences a breast cancer scare after doctors found a large mass on her breast.

=== Season 4 additions ===
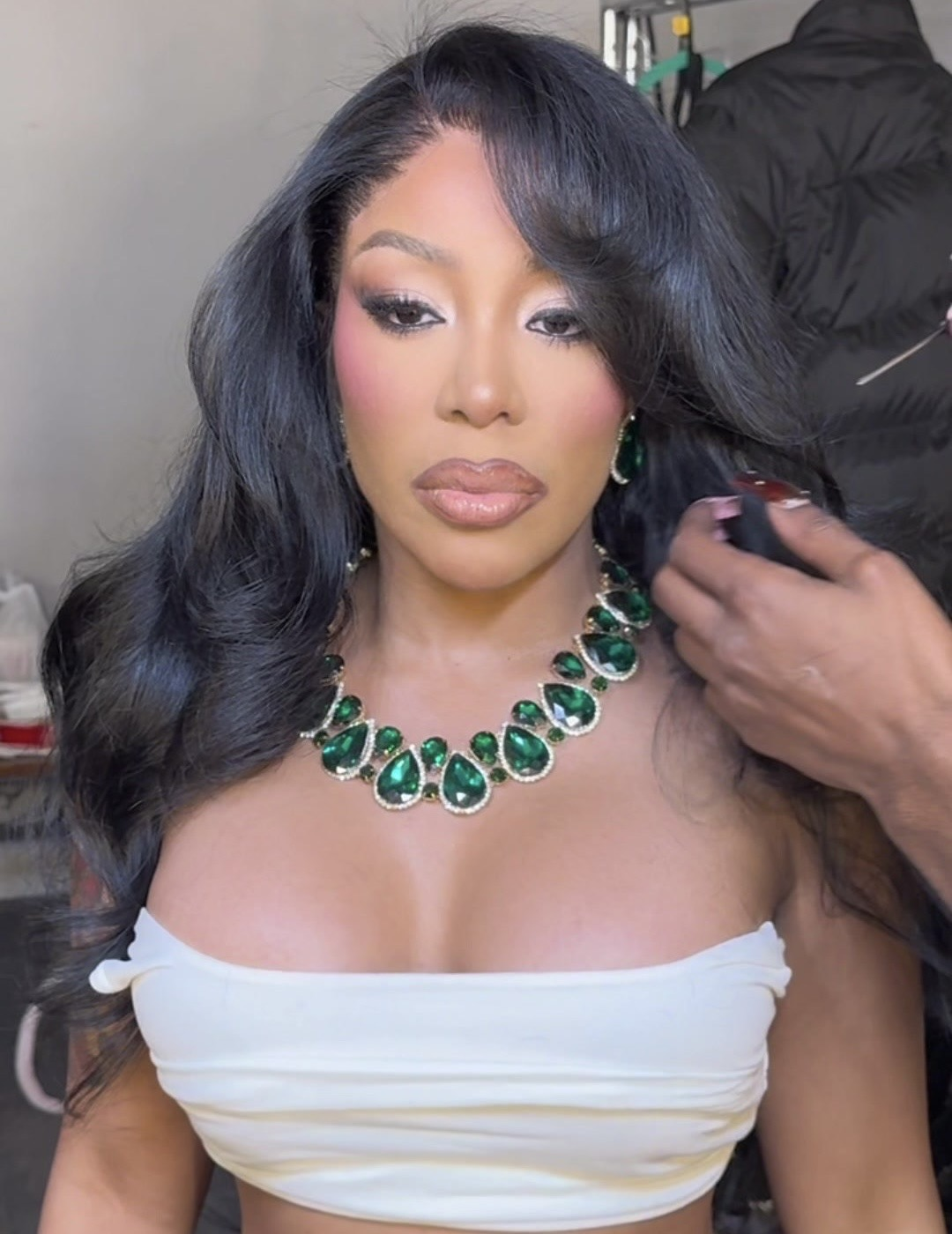
K. Michelle joins the cast in season four.
- Taranasha Wallace (Seasons 4–6, supporting cast member in season 7, cameo in season 8) is an aspiring actress, restaurant manager and etiquette coach, originally from Jayess, Mississippi. She came into the public eye for her relationship with rapper Peter Gunz, who she began dating in 2000, and is the mother of his sons, Jamison Pankey, born in 2008, and Kaz Pankey, born in 2012. In season four, she discovers that Peter has married another woman, Amina, behind her back, leading to a violent showdown between the two women. The dramatic storyline, reminiscent of the love triangle featuring Mimi, Joseline and Stevie J on Love & Hip Hop: Atlanta, generated the highest ratings in the show's history. In season five, Peter continues to go back and forth between Tara and Amina, leading to a controversial period in season six where the two women are pregnant at the same time. In 2016, Tara gave birth to her third son with Peter, Gunner Ethan Pankey. During season seven, Tara and Amina were phased out of the show, returning only as supporting cast members. She appears briefly in an uncredited cameo in season eight, where she is seen attending Rich's diabetes awareness event. Tara also appears in the specials The Wedding, Love & Hip Hop Awards: Most Certified (where she won in the Romance Gone Wrong category) and 40 Greatest Love & Hip Hop Moments: The Reboot, and in an episode of the web series VH1: UnVeiled.
- Erica Jean Newman (Season 4) is an aspiring actress. She was born in The Bronx and raised in Queens to a Puerto Rican mother and African-American father. She came into the public eye after having a son, Brian Steven Robert Newman, with rapper Saigon in 2012. Erica joins the cast of Love & Hip Hop: New York in season four, which chronicles her and Saigon's volatile relationship, and their struggles in raising their child, who is revealed to have developmental disabilities. Erica and Saigon did not return to the show after the season's reunion special, and later appeared together on an episode of OWN's Iyanla: Fix My Life.
- Amina Buddafly (Seasons 4–6, supporting cast member in season 7, guest star in season 10), real name Aminata Schmahl Pankey, is a Senegalese-German R&B singer-songwriter, originally from Hamburg, Germany. She rose to fame as a former member of the girl group Black Buddafly, with her sisters Jazz and Sophie. She joins the cast in season four as the secret wife of rapper Peter Gunz. Their marriage is revealed dramatically early into the season, leading to a violent showdown between Amina and Tara, his girlfriend of 13 years, and the mother of his children. At the season's reunion, she reveals that she is pregnant with Peter's child. She would give birth to a daughter, Cori Pankey, in July 2014. Peter continues to go back and forth between her and Tara in season five, and after falling pregnant in season six, Amina decides to have an abortion. At the season's reunion, while Tara is pregnant with Peter's baby, she reveals she is also expecting another child with Peter. In 2016, Amina gave birth to her second daughter, Bronx Pankey. Amina returns in a minor supporting role towards the end of season seven, after moving to Los Angeles for a fresh start. During the season, she officially ends her relationship with Peter. Amina returns in a guest role in season ten, where she is seen attending Erica Mena's bachelorette party, and as a bridesmaid at her and Safaree's wedding ceremony. Amina also appears in the specials Love & Hip Hop Awards: Most Certified (where she won in the Dropping Bombs and Romance Gone Wrong categories) and 40 Greatest Love & Hip Hop Moments: The Reboot.
- K. Michelle (Season 4), born Kimberly Michelle Pate, is a R&B/soul singer-songwriter, originally from Memphis, Tennessee. She first appeared in the first two seasons of Love & Hip Hop: Atlanta, as one of its original six cast members. She joins the cast of Love & Hip Hop: New York in season four, which chronicles her move from Atlanta to New York. Her appearance on the show served primarily to set up her own spin-off show, K. Michelle: My Life, which premiered months later. As such, she appeared infrequently, interacted mainly with Yandy and Tara and did not attend the season's reunion. Michelle also performed at Yandy and Mendecees' wedding on the live special Love & Hip Hop Live: The Wedding, before briefly rejoining the cast of Love & Hip Hop: Atlanta and later Love & Hip Hop: Hollywood after her spin-off ended after three seasons.

=== Season 5 additions ===
- Cyn Santana (Seasons 5, 9–10, supporting cast member in season 4), born Cynthia Pacheco, is an urban model, video vixen and aspiring singer. She was born in Washington Heights, Manhattan, to a Dominican father and Salvadorian mother. Cyn first appears in a supporting role in season four as Erica Mena's new girlfriend. The season chronicles their blossoming romance, her first relationship with a woman. Cyn is promoted to the main cast in season five, which chronicles her and Erica's dramatic and violent break up. During the season, she embarks on a music career, releasing the single "How Can You Leave?" with producer Cisco Rosado, in tribute to her late brother who committed suicide the year before. Later, she begins dating her longtime friend Ray Stacks, who she introduces at the season's reunion. After a four-year hiatus, Cyn returned as a main cast member in season nine with Joe Budden. Although they never interacted together previously on the show, the two began dating in 2016, and welcomed a son, Lexington, in December 2017. The season chronicles their relationship struggles, including her battle with postpartum depression. During the season, she reveals that she was molested by a female babysitter when she was five years old. In the season finale, Joe proposes and the two become engaged. Cyn and Joe called off their engagement just months after the season's reunion special, allegedly due to Joe's infidelity. The tenth season chronicles Cyn's struggles to co-parent after the breakup, amid tensions with ex-girlfriend Erica when she starts playing matchmaker with Joe and his ex Tahiry.
- Chrissy Monroe (Season 5), born Christina Crastanda, is an Italian-American socialite and model agent, originally from Baltimore, Maryland. She is a former sex worker and madam, who claims Erica Mena used to work as an escort for her. Season five chronicles her relationship struggles with rapper Chink Santana and her desires to have a family. The couple eventually break up.

=== Season 6 additions ===
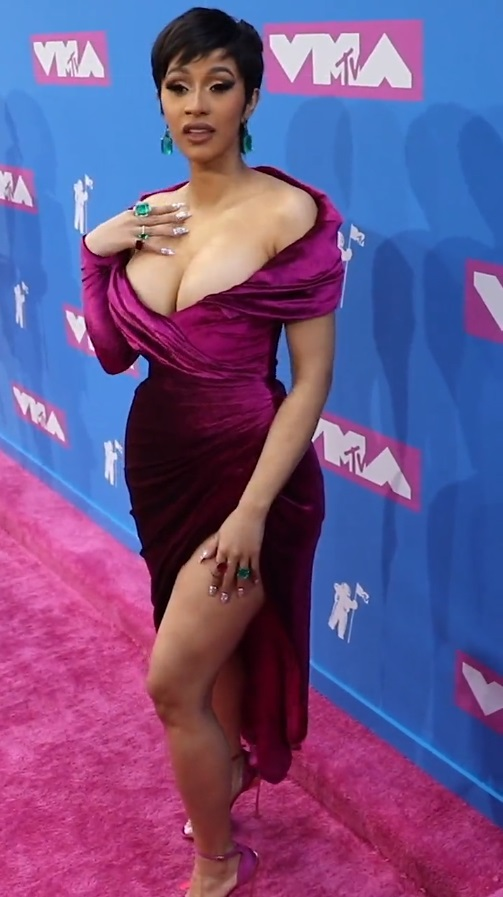
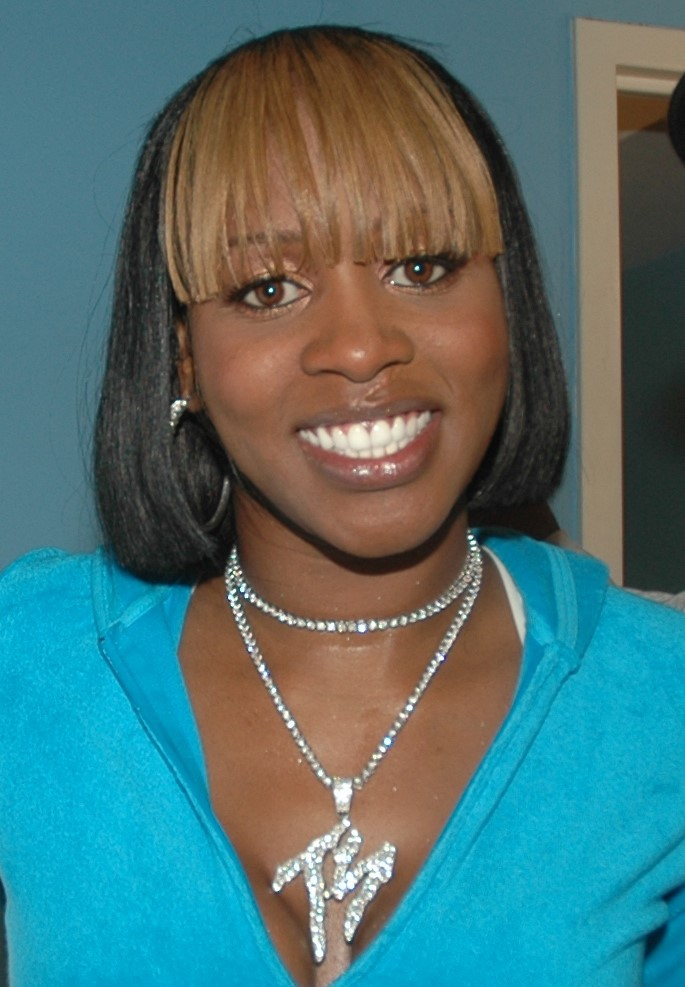
Cardi B (top) and Remy Ma (below) joined the cast of Love & Hip Hop: New York in season six.
- Cardi B (Seasons 6–7), born Belcalis Marlenis Almanzar, is a rapper. She was born in The Bronx to a Dominican father and Trinidadian mother. Her sister, Hennessy Carolina, also appears on the show. Cardi worked as a stripper for five years, and rose to fame as a social media personality for her video posts on Instagram and Vine. She joins the cast of Love & Hip Hop: New York in season six. With her fiancé Tommy in prison, Cardi enjoys a casual fling with DJ Self, leading to a violent altercation with his girlfriend Yorma. Cardi and Self end up clashing later in the season, when he fails to take her rap career seriously. In season seven, Cardi's music career begins to take off after the release of her mixtapes, and her relationship with producer Swift turns sexual, leading to a heated confrontation with his girlfriend Asia. On December 30, 2016, she announced she was leaving the show to focus on her rap career. Cardi is considered the show's breakout star and catapulted to stardom shortly after her stint on the show, signing a record deal with Atlantic Records and releasing the Grammy Award-nominated single "Bodak Yellow", which reached #1 on the US Billboard Hot 100 chart. In September 2017, she married Offset of the southern hip hop group Migos, and gave birth to a daughter, Kulture Kiari Cephus in July 2018. Cardi returned briefly to the franchise in the 2019 special Love & Hip Hop Awards: Most Certified, where she won the Most Quotable category.
- Miss Moe Money & Sexxy Lexxy (Season 6), born Monisha Brown and Alexis Smith Walker, are members of the rap duo BBOD (Bad Bitches on Deck). They are credited together in the opening credits and share green screen scenes in several episodes. The duo were born in Harlem, although Moe grew up in Pennsylvania. Lexxy's uncle and mentor is the rapper Treach. Season six chronicles their internal struggles as a duo as well as their violent rivalries with fellow rappers Bianca Bonnie and Mariahlynn.
- Mariahlynn Jacoby-Araujo (Seasons 6–8, supporting cast member in season 9, cameo in season 10) is a rapper. She was born in Jersey City to an Italian mother and Puerto Rican father. Her mother suffers from substance abuse issues, and she endured a rough childhood within the foster care system. In order to provide for her family, Mariahlynn worked as a stripper and a go-go dancer. She was discovered by DJ Self, who helped make her single, "Once Upon a Time (I Was a Hoe)", a radio hit. In season six, she sparks feuds with Moe and Lexxy, and tries to beat the "creep squad" at their own game, having casual flings with Cisco Rosado and Rich Dollaz. In season seven, she signs to Self's record label, Gwinin Entertainment, and finds herself caught in a contract war between Self and Cisco, as well as a violent rivalry with Major Galore, Self's only other female artist. In season eight, she briefly dates singer James R, which ends after she finds him in a compromising position at a video shoot with Sophia Body. During the season, her friendship with Bianca Bonnie puts her at odds with rapper Brittney Taylor, and DreamDoll, Gwinin's newest signee. Mariahlynn returns as a supporting cast member in season nine. After her mother faces legal issues once again, she battles to gain sole custody of her sister Icelynn. At the season's reunion, she professes her love for Rich, and reveals that the two have been in a secret, on-again-off-again relationship for eight years. Mariahlynn appears in an uncredited cameo in season ten, where she is seen in the background of Jonathan's fundraising event. Mariahlynn also appears in the specials Joseline's Special Delivery, Dirty Little Secrets, The Love Edition, Love & Hip Hop Awards: Most Certified and 40 Greatest Love & Hip Hop Moments: The Reboot, and in the web series VH1: UnVeiled.
- Remy Ma (Seasons 6–10), born Reminisce Smith Mackie, is a Grammy Award-nominated rapper. She was born in The Bronx. Remy spent six and a half years in prison for shooting a former friend of hers over a financial dispute. She married rapper Papoose while she was incarcerated in 2008. She has a son, Jayson "Jace" Smith, born 2000, from a previous relationship. Remy makes her first franchise appearance in an episode of Love & Hip Hop Atlanta: After Party Live!, where she announces that she will be joining the cast of Love & Hip Hop: New York. Season six chronicles her struggles to adjust to life after her release from prison. She and Papoose renew their vows in an official ceremony in the finale. Seasons seven and eight focus on the couple's struggles to conceive a child together, including a devastating ectopic pregnancy. In season nine, after undergoing intensive IVF treatments, she becomes pregnant with her first child with Papoose, who he nicknames "The Golden Child". In December 2018, Remy gave birth to a daughter, Reminisce MacKenzie Mackie. Season ten chronicles her struggles to release her highly anticipated album, 7 Winters and 6 Summers, while raising her newborn daughter, as well as her legal battle with former co-star Brittney Taylor, who accuses her of assault. Remy and Papoose also star in the holiday special Remy & Papoose: A Merry Mackie Holiday and the spin-off Remy & Papoose: Meet the Mackies. She also appears in an episode the specials Dirty Little Secrets, The Love Edition, Love & Hip Hop Awards: Most Certified and 40 Greatest Love & Hip Hop Moments: The Reboot.

=== Season 7 additions ===
- Bianca Bonnie (Seasons 7–8, supporting cast member in season 6), born Bianca Dupree, is a rapper. She was born in Harlem. She rose to fame at the age of 15 under the name Young B with the hit single, "Chicken Noodle Soup", which won her a Soul Train Music Award. Season six chronicles her return to the music industry after some personal struggles. She signs to Yandy's management and ends up winning Self's Gwinin Fest, beating out rapper rivals Moe and Lexxy and new ally Mariahlynn. She is promoted to main cast in season seven, where she pursues a romance with DJ Drewski, sparking a feud with his girlfriend Sky. In season eight, her violent antics threaten to derail her career when a rival from her past, rapper Brittney Taylor, comes to New York. After multiple altercations between the two girls, Yandy severs their business relationship for good. After a public fallout with Mariahlynn, Bianca confirmed on social media that the season would be her last. In 2020, Bianca returned to reality television, appearing on We TV's Marriage Boot Camp: Reality Stars 14 — Hip Hop Edition 2 with fellow Love & Hip Hop star Joseline Hernandez.
- Felicia Pearson (Seasons 7–8), better known as Snoop, is an actress, originally from Baltimore, Maryland. Pearson was born a crack baby, and before discovering acting, endured a rough life in the foster care system, including working as a drug dealer and being convicted of second-degree murder by the age of 15. She is best known for her role in the HBO series The Wire. Season seven chronicles her attempts to launch her own record label Gorgeous Gangster Records, as well as her romantic struggles with girlfriend J. Adrienne, who identifies as heterosexual and "only gay for Snoop". The couple break up during the course of the season. Although still credited as lead in every episode in season eight, she appears as a background character, having little-to-no storyline of her own.

=== Season 8 additions ===
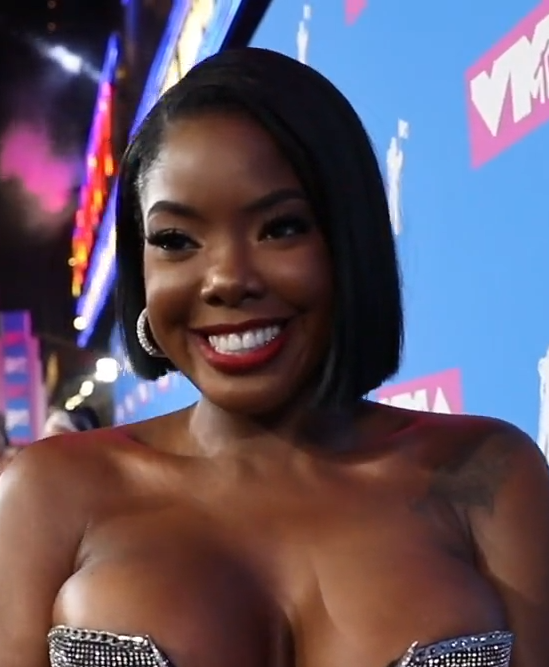
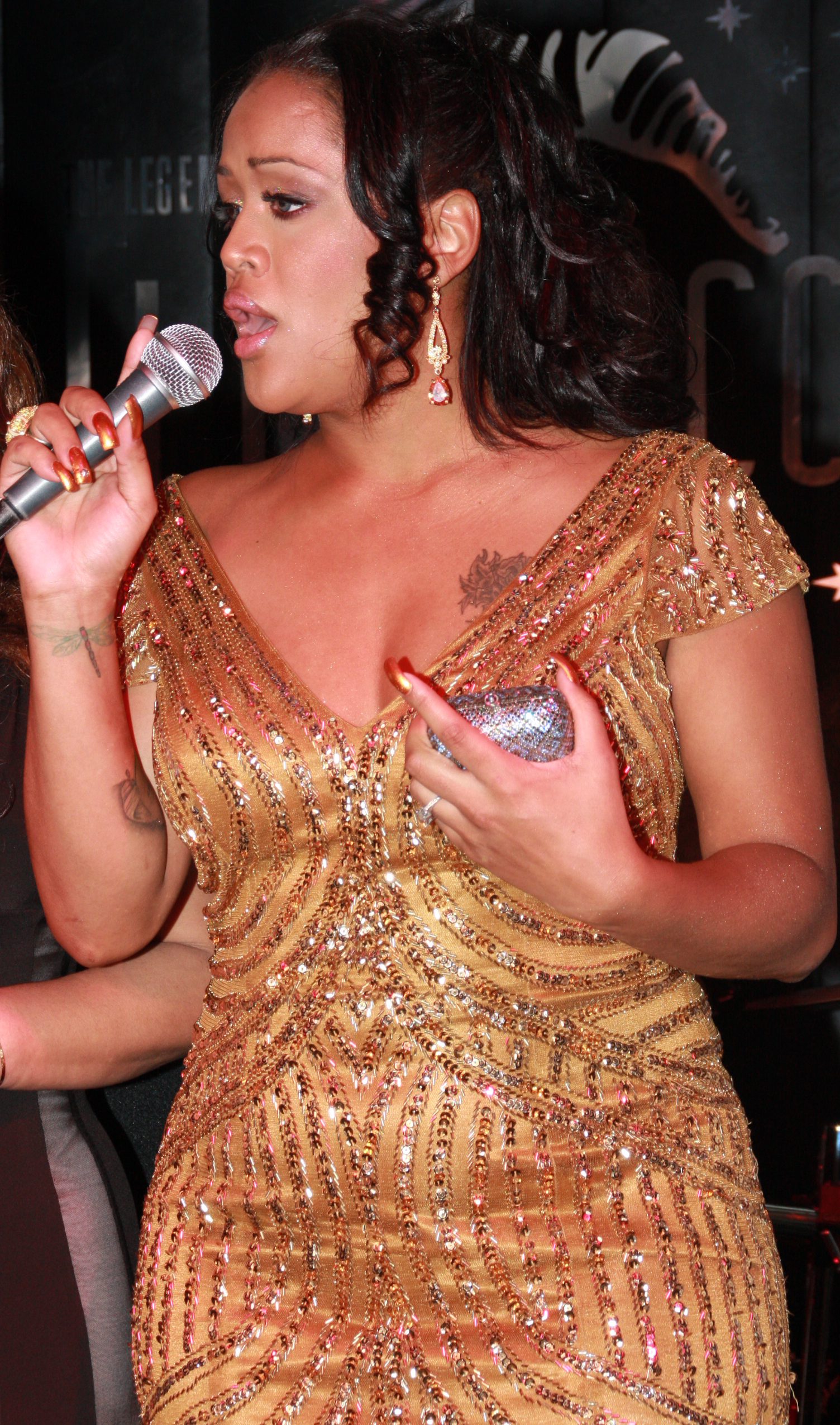
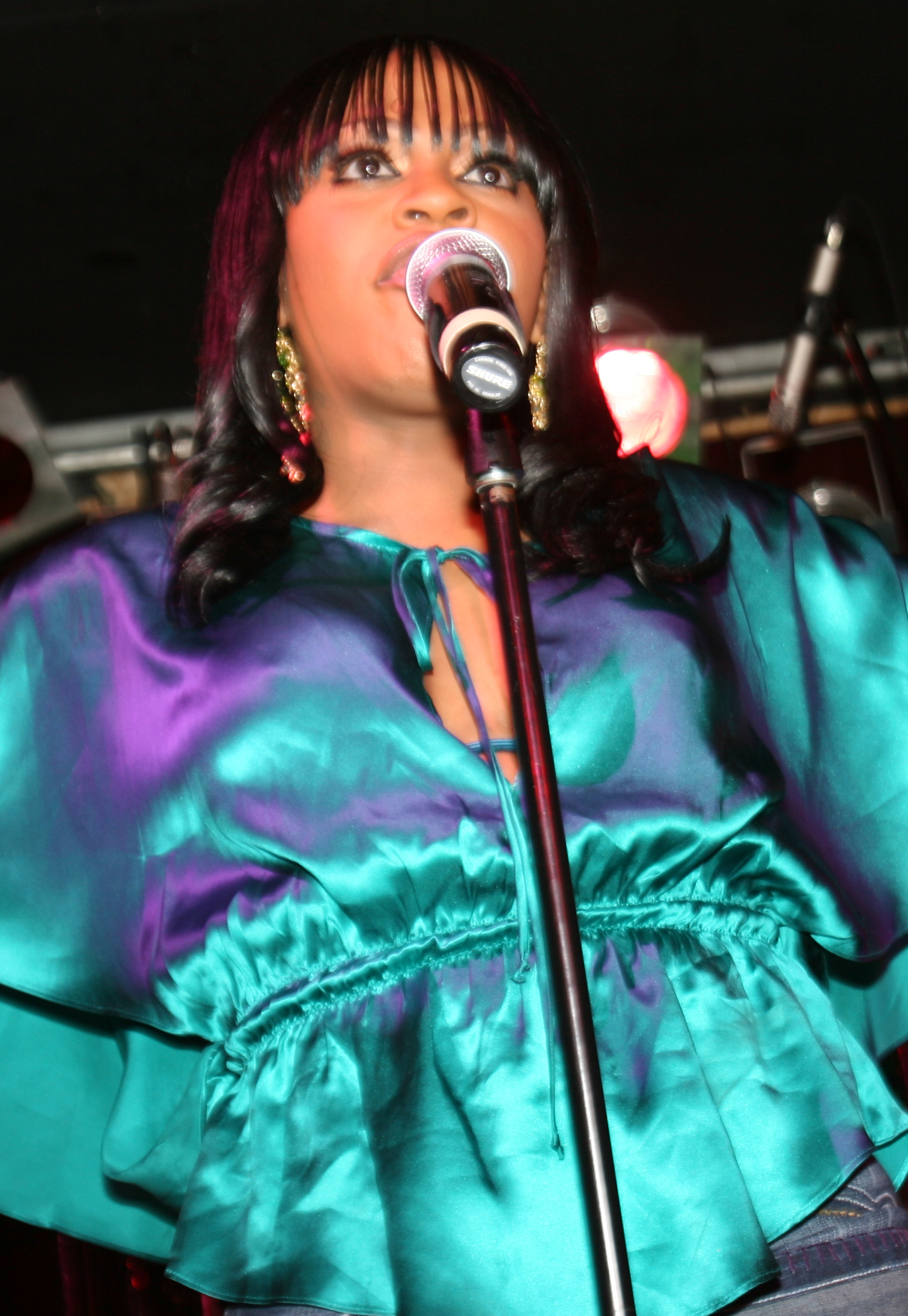
Juju (top), Anaís (center) and Lil' Mo (below) joined the cast of Love & Hip Hop: New York in season eight.
- Juju Castaneda (Season 8–9, supporting cast member in seasons 7, 10, cameo in season 6) is an Afro-Latina author, entrepreneur and social media personality. She was born in Brooklyn, New York City and raised in Miami, Florida by Afro-Cuban immigrants. She came into the public eye through her ten-year relationship with rapper Cam'ron, who she began dating in 2007. The couple became engaged in 2013. She is a graduate of Barry University, obtaining both a bachelor's degree in business and a master's degree in public administration. She is also a licensed real estate broker in Florida and the proprietor of a hair care and wig company, Candy Jewels Hair. Juju and Cam were initially approached to join the cast of Love & Hip Hop: New York in season three, however they declined. Juju appears briefly in an uncredited cameo in season six while attending Remy and Papoose's wedding. Juju joins the supporting cast in season seven, acting as a friend and confidante to Kimbella, Yandy and Remy. During the season, she releases her first book, Secrets of a Jewel, which causes minor controversy with the girls when Yandy believes one of the characters is based on her. Juju is promoted to the main cast in season eight, with her storyline revolving around her adapting Secrets of a Jewel into a play. She reveals that her and Cam have called off their engagement and develops a close friendship with Safaree. In season nine, she has a falling out with Jonathan over a business dispute, however the two eventually reconcile. She returns in a supporting role in season ten. Juju also appears as a supporting cast member in one episode of Love & Hip Hop: Miami's first season, and attends its reunion, and as a guest star in the spin-off show Remy & Papoose: Meet the Mackies.
- Anaís Martínez Brito (Season 8, supporting cast member in season 7, cameo in season 10) is a Latin Grammy Award-nominated singer, originally from Santo Domingo, Dominican Republic. She came to the United States at an early age and was raised in The Bronx since she was eight years old. In 2002, she appeared on an episode of The Jerry Springer Show titled "Bring On The Bisexuals". She rose to fame after winning the Puerto-Rican singing competition show Objetivo Fama in 2005. She resides in Clifton, New Jersey with her husband Confesor Ruben Brito, a businessman who works at a luxury car dealership, and their two sons, Diamond and King Brito. Anaís joins the cast in season eight. Frustrated by the state of her career and stuck in a miserable marriage, she becomes recklessly flirtatious, culminating in an affair with Rich Dollaz. She returns as a supporting cast member in season nine, but disappears from the show after a few episodes. It is eventually revealed that she has been struggling with mental illness, and been in and out of mental health facilities for the past few months. Anaís appears in an uncredited cameo in season ten, where she is seen in the background of Jonathan's fundraising event.
- Lil' Mo (Season 8), born Cynthia Karen Loving, is a Grammy Award-nominated R&B singer and songwriter. She is best known for her "anti-chicken head" anthem "Superwoman Pt. II", which is credited for launching the career of then-unknown Fabolous, as well as for her collaborations with Missy Elliott and Ja Rule. Mo previously appeared on the TV One reality series R&B Divas: Los Angeles. She is married to the boxer Karl Dargan, with whom she shares a son, Karl Jr., born 2015, as well as seven other children from previous relationships. Season eight chronicles her struggles juggling her career with her marriage and family life, while dealing with persistent rumors of Karl's infidelity. Mo and Karl do not return to the show after the season's reunion special, in which Mo announces that she is expecting their second child together. Mo later admitted on social media that she had suffered a miscarriage a month before the reunion aired. In 2019, the couple would appear together on We TV's Marriage Boot Camp: Reality Stars 12 — Hip Hop Edition with several other Love & Hip Hop couples. Mo revealed in later interviews that shortly after filming the show she left Karl, after he had spat on her in front of their children during an argument.

=== Season 9 additions ===
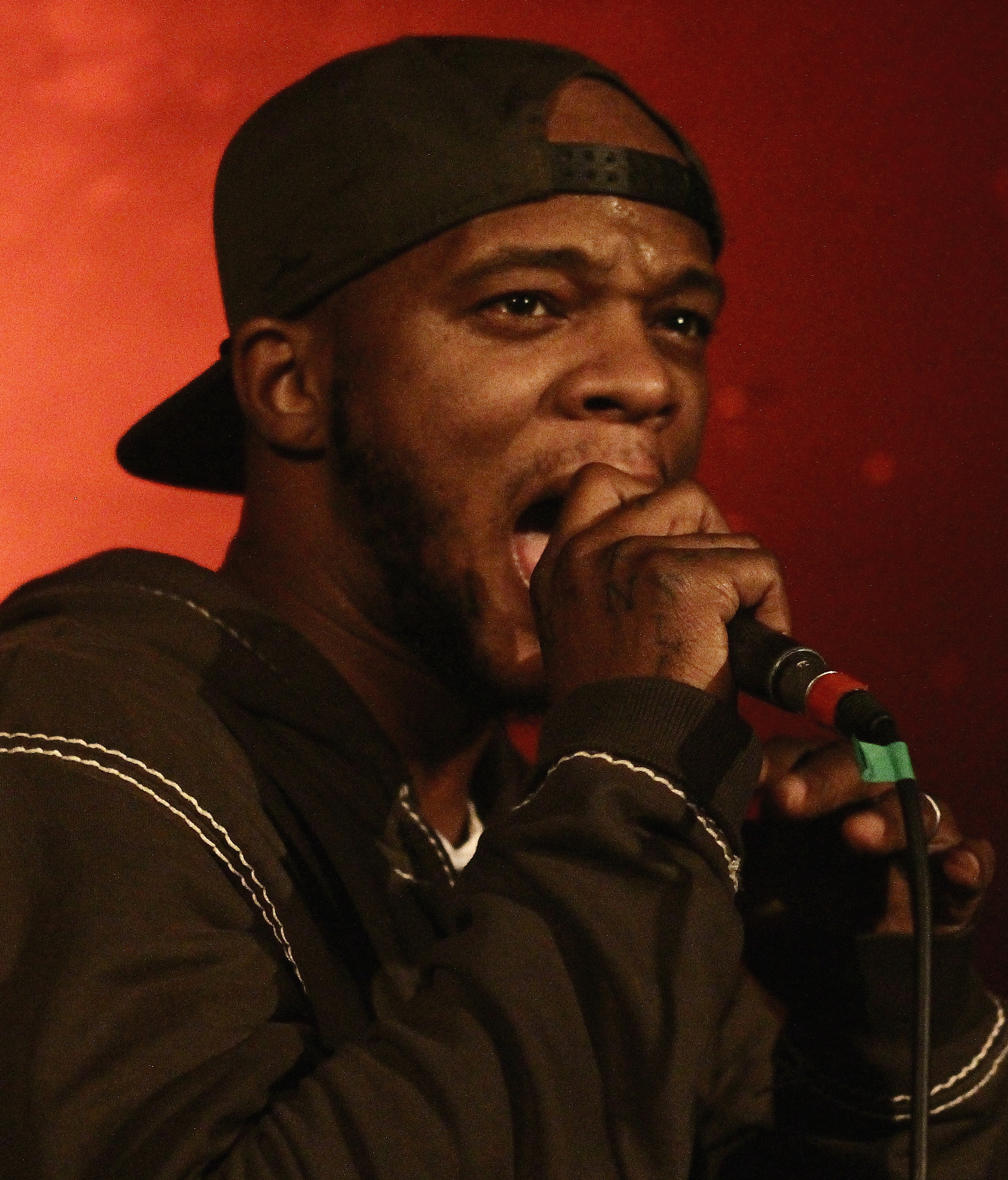
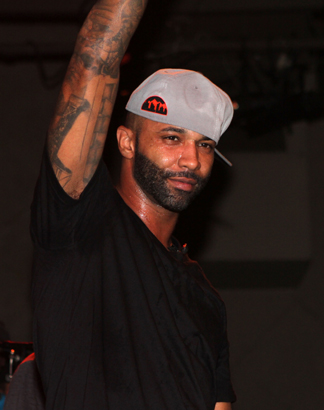
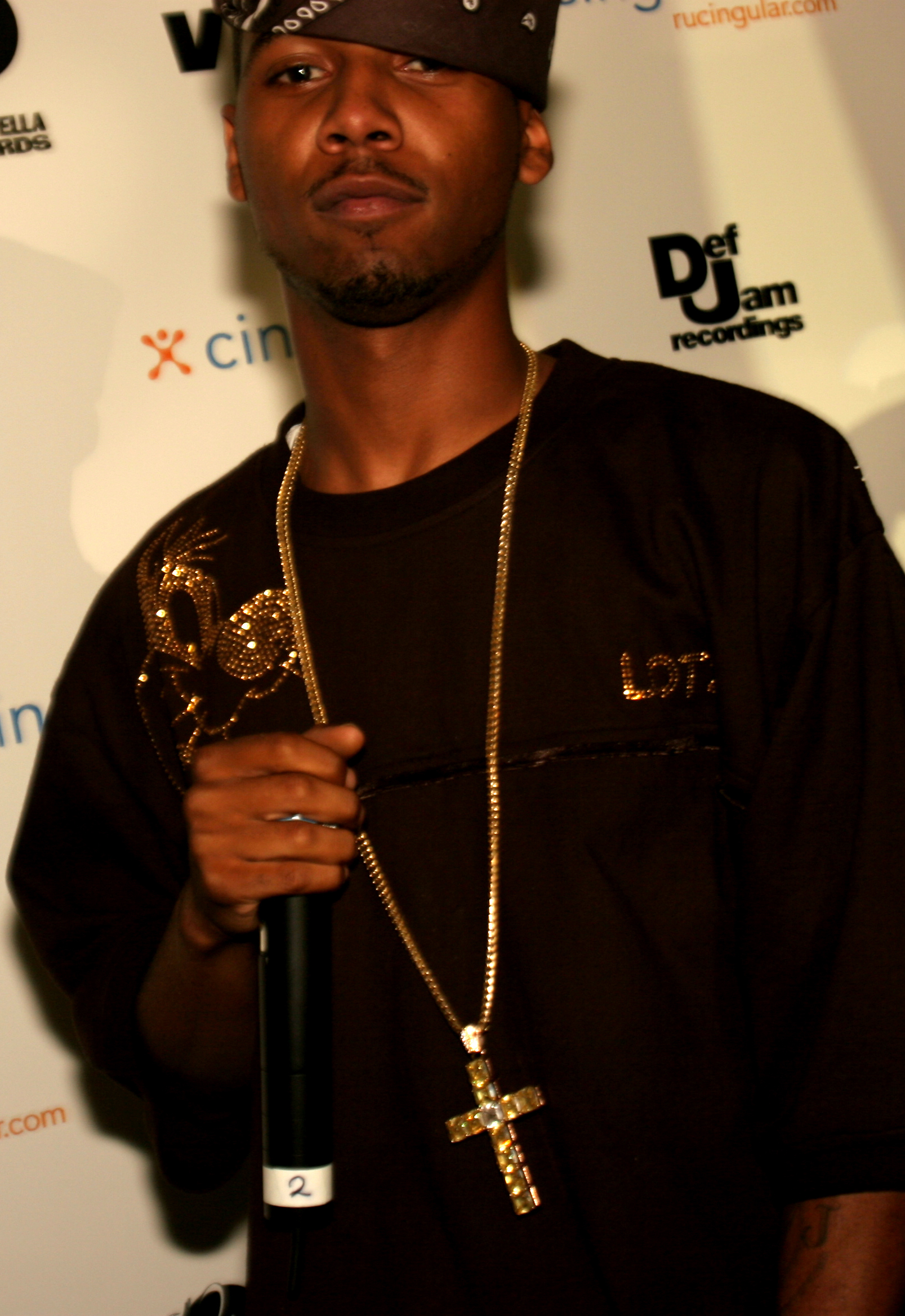
Papoose (top), Joe Budden (middle) and Juelz Santana (below) appeared as supporting cast members before joining the main cast in season nine of Love & Hip Hop: New York.
- Papoose (Seasons 9–10, supporting cast member in seasons 6–8), born Shamele Mackie, is a rapper. He was born and raised in the Bedford-Stuyvesant neighborhood of Brooklyn and has ancestry from Liberia. He married Remy Ma while she was incarcerated in 2008. Papoose has two children with ex-girlfriend Yvetta Lashley, Dejanae Mackie, born November 1997, and Shamele Mackie, born April 1999. He also has a daughter, Destiny, born September 2000. Papoose joins the supporting cast in season six, where he helps Remy adjust to life after prison. The two renew their vows in an official ceremony in the finale. Seasons seven and eight focus on their struggles to conceive a child together, including a devastating ectopic pregnancy. He is promoted to the main cast in season nine, although he appears infrequently. In the season finale, he welcomes his first child with Remy, Reminisce MacKenzie Mackie. Season ten chronicles his attempts to release new music while raising his newborn daughter. Papoose also stars in the holiday special Remy & Papoose: A Merry Mackie Holiday, and the spin-off Remy & Papoose: Meet the Mackies, as well as the specials Dirty Little Secrets and The Love Edition.
- Joe Budden (Seasons 9–10, supporting cast member in seasons 3–4) is a Grammy Award-nominated rapper. He was born in Harlem, New York, and raised in Jersey City, New Jersey. He has a son, Tré Budden, born 2001, from a previous relationship. Seasons three and four chronicle his substance abuse issues and romantic troubles, including his turbulent relationships with Tahiry and Kaylin Garcia. In 2015, he appeared with Kaylin on VH1's Couples Therapy. In 2017, he announced his retirement from rap, and instead found success as a broadcaster, having a much publicized run as a co-host on Everyday Struggle for Complex. In 2018, Joe created the late-night talk show State of the Culture for Revolt, which he hosts with his Love & Hip Hop co-star Remy Ma, and landed an exclusive partnership with Spotify to host his podcast, The Joe Budden Podcast. Joe returns as a main cast member in season nine, with his girlfriend Cyn Santana. Although they never interacted together previously on the show, the two began dating in 2016, and welcomed a son, Lexington, in December 2017. The season chronicles their relationship struggles. In the season finale, he proposes and the two become engaged. Joe and Cyn called off their engagement just months after the season's reunion, as a result of Joe's alleged infidelity. The tenth season documents the aftermath of their breakup as well as Joe's reconnection with his ex, Tahiry.
- Juelz Santana (Season 9, supporting cast member in season 7, guest star in seasons 1–2, 10), born LaRon Louis James, is a Grammy Award-nominated rapper. He is a member of the East Coast rap group The Diplomats, alongside Jim Jones and Cam'ron. He was born in Harlem to an African-American mother and Dominican father. He has been in an on-again, off-again relationship with Kimbella since 2009 and is the father of her children, Juelz Santana James, born 2010, and Bella Monroe James, born 2012. He also has a son, LaRon Louis James Jr., born 2003 from a previous relationship. After minor guest appearances in the first two seasons, Juelz joins the supporting cast in season seven, which documents his comeback to the music industry. He returns as a main cast member in season nine, which chronicles his opiate addiction and legal issues, after he was arrested for bringing a loaded gun to Newark Airport. During the season, he proposes to Kimbella and the two marry in the finale. During the reunion special, Kimbella reveals that she is pregnant with the couple's third child (and Juelz' fourth). Juelz began a 27-month federal prison sentence on March 1, 2019. Kimbella gave birth to Santana James in July 2019. He would continue to make appearances via phone call conversations with Kimbella during season ten. Santana was released from prison early on August 5, 2020, after serving 17 months.
- Rich Dollaz (Seasons 9–10, supporting cast member in seasons 1–8), born Richard Ashton Martin-Trowers, is a music executive and entertainment manager, originally from Waterbury, Connecticut. He is the CEO of Dollaz Unlimited. He began his career as an intern working in the promotional and marketing department at Bad Boy Records. He has a daughter, Ashley, with former girlfriend Miracle Kaye Hall, along with several other children. He has been arrested multiple times for not paying child support. Dollaz is introduced as Olivia's long term manager. Subsequent seasons focus on his love life, as well as his tendency to mix business with pleasure with the various women he manages, including Erica Mena in seasons three and four, Jhonni Blaze and Diamond Strawberry in season five, Mariahlynn in season six, Jade Wifey in season seven and Anaís in season eight. Rich is a member of the self-professed "creep squad", along with Peter and Cisco, and later, Self and Snoop. After appearing in every season prior as a supporting cast member, Dollaz is promoted to the main cast in season nine. During the season, his baby mama Miracle faces legal issues after shooting her husband in a domestic dispute. Season ten chronicles his efforts to help up-and-coming rapper Jennaske, amid tensions with his ex, Erica Mena, and his former client Olivia, who accuses him of stealing song royalties from her. Rich appears as a supporting cast member in season two of Love & Hip Hop: Hollywood, which chronicles his relationship with Moniece Slaughter, and in two episodes of season seven of Love & Hip Hop: Atlanta, where he reunites with his ex Erica Mena, in a scheme orchestrated by Stevie J. Rich also appears in one episode of Love & Hip Hop Atlanta: After Party Live! and in the specials 40 Greatest Love & Hip Hop Moments, The Wedding, Love & Hip Hop Hollywood: Dirty Little Secrets, Love & Hip Hop New York: Dirty Little Secrets and The Love Edition.
- Safaree Samuels (Seasons 9–10, supporting cast member in season 8) is a rapper and record producer. He came into the public eye through his relationship with Nicki Minaj, whom he dated from 2002 until 2014. He was born in Brooklyn to Jamaican parents. He previously appeared on K. Michelle: My Life and as a main cast member on Love & Hip Hop: Hollywood. Safaree joins the supporting cast of Love & Hip Hop: New York in season eight, which chronicles his return to New York to be closer to his family. He briefly dates DreamDoll, before developing a close friendship with Juju. At the reunion, it is revealed in a deleted scene that he hooked up with Mariahlynn. He is promoted to main cast in season nine, which chronicles his recent career struggles, including being robbed at gunpoint, having his nude photos leak and being booed off the stage during a performance at Dyckman Park. Later in the season, he begins dating his Scared Famous co-star Erica Mena, which causes tensions between him, Joe Budden and her exes Rich Dollaz and Cyn Santana. On December 24, 2018, Safaree proposed to Erica after a month of dating. On September 12, 2019, Erica announced that she and Safaree were expecting their first child together. She rejoins the cast with Safaree in season ten, which chronicles the couple's relationship struggles, as well as their wedding ceremony and the birth of their daughter, born 2020. Safaree also appears on season ten of Love & Hip Hop: Atlanta, as a supporting cast member on season two of Leave It to Stevie, as a guest star in Remy & Papoose: Meet the Mackies and in the specials Dirty Little Secrets, The Love Edition, Love & Hip Hop Awards: Most Certified and 40 Greatest Love & Hip Hop Moments: The Reboot.

== Supporting cast members ==
=== Original cast members ===
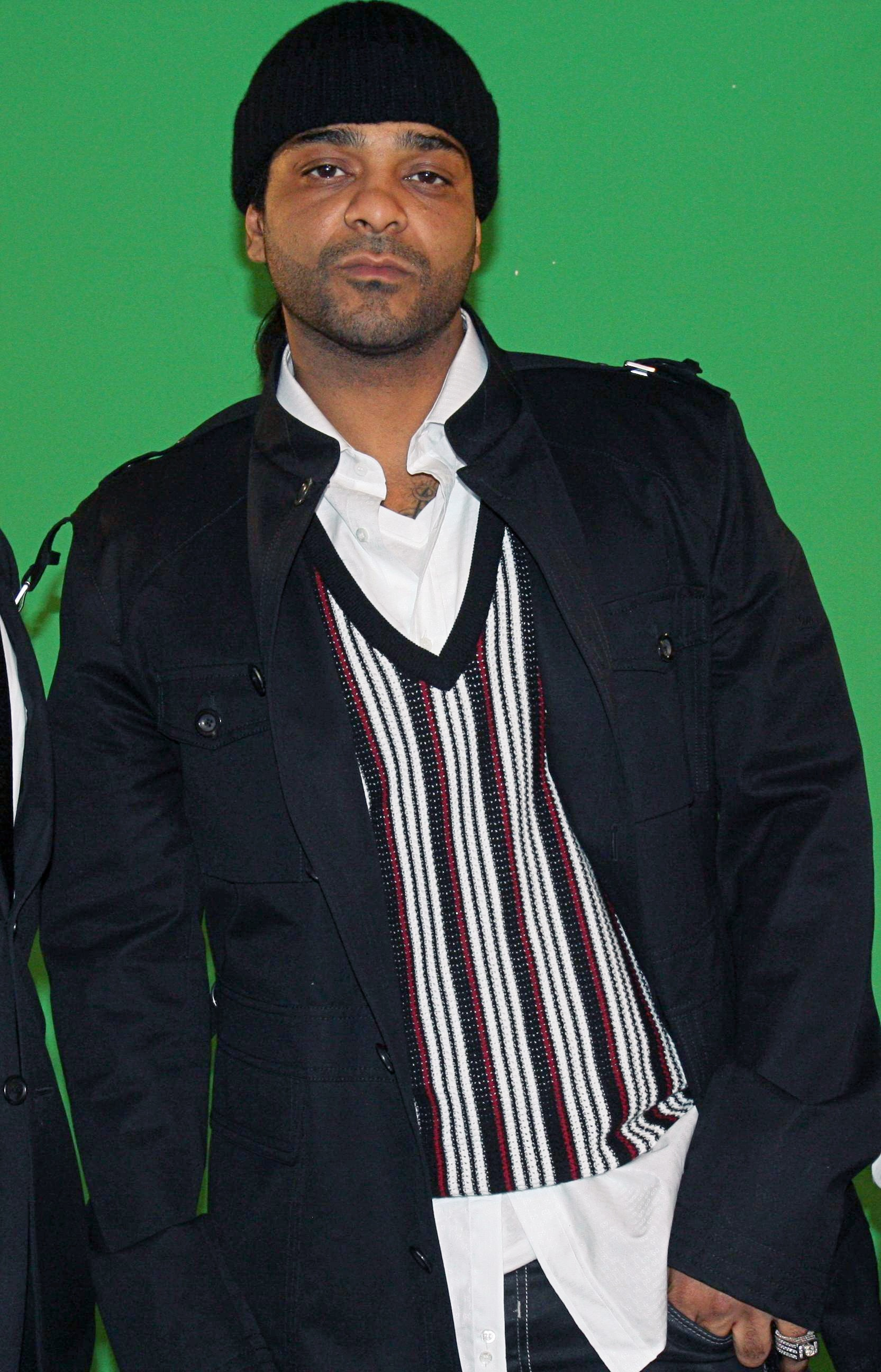
Jim Jones appears as a supporting cast member in the first two seasons of Love & Hip Hop: New York.
- Jim Jones (Seasons 1–2, 10), born Joseph Guillermo Jones II, is a rapper. He is a member of the East Coast rap group The Diplomats, alongside Juelz Santana and Cam'ron. He was born in The Bronx, New York, to an Aruban mother and Puerto Rican father, and raised in Harlem. He has a son, Joseph Guillermo "Pudie" Jones III, from a previous relationship, born 2003. Jim has been in a relationship with Chrissy Lampkin since 2004, after meeting her in Miami. In 2006, Jim appeared in a presentation tape for Keeping Up with the Joneses, a proposed doco-series that would chronicle Jim's life, as well as the behind-the-scenes dramas in making the documentary. The pilot was pitched to VH1 and become the basis for what would eventually become Love & Hip Hop. The first two seasons chronicle Jim's commitment issues and struggles with Chrissy, as well as his dramatic falling out with long-term manager Yandy. During the first season, Chrissy proposes to Jim and the two become engaged. On September 7, 2012, VH1 announced that Jim and Chrissy would leave the show to star in their own spin-off show Chrissy & Mr. Jones, which chronicled their relationship struggles, as well as Jim's business ventures, specifically his Vamp Life brand. After a six-year hiatus from the franchise, Jim and Chrissy rejoined the cast of Love & Hip Hop: New York for its tenth anniversary season.
- Mashonda Tifrere (Season 1) is a R&B singer, originally from Boston, Massachusetts. She was raised in Harlem, New York. She was married to rapper Swizz Beatz from 2004 until 2008, when he famously left her for Alicia Keys. She is the mother of his son, Kasseem Dean, Jr., born 2006. She appears in a supporting role in the first season, appearing as a mentor to Emily, warning her about the dangers of dating men in the industry. Despite only appearing in three episodes and not attending the reunion, Mashonda is featured in promo pictures, group shots and on the first season DVD cover with the four main cast members. She quit the series after having issues with her portrayal, and since her time on the show, has mended her relationship with Swizz and Alicia, releasing a book about blended families.
- Maurice Aguilar (Seasons 1–2) is Somaya's manager. He is the co-founder and Senior Vice President of Media Monopoly Group, a 360 media management firm based out of New York and Los Angeles. During the first season, he involves himself in the conflict between Chrissy and Somaya. After he makes reference to Jim's alleged money issues during the fight at the yacht party, Jim comes after him on the streets of New York. Later in the season, he and Somaya come into conflict with Olivia and her manager Rich. He is dramatically fired by Somaya two episodes into season two, and he is not seen again.
- Nancy "Mama" Jones (Seasons 1–2, 10) is Jim's mother. She was born in Manhattan to Aruban parents. She is a community activist, youth advocate and self-professed hustler, with several business ventures. In 2006, she appeared with Jim and Chrissy in the presentation tape for Keeping Up with the Joneses, which would eventually become Love & Hip Hop. The first two seasons chronicle her strained relationship with daughter-in-law Chrissy, including her release of "Psychotic", a diss track aimed at Chrissy. Nancy is the first mother of another cast member to be predominately featured in the franchise, subsequent seasons and spin-offs would also feature the archetype of the eccentric, overbearing mother meddling in the affairs of her children. She is also the first cast member to release a diss track against another cast member, a regular fixture within the franchise. Nancy left the series for a supporting role on the spin-off show Chrissy & Mr. Jones, which chronicles her antics with friends Freddie and Sassy, as well as her business ventures, including a perfume, PumKásh and a sex advice book. During this time, she starred in the VH1 web series, Mama Jones' World. After appearing with Jim and Chrissy in the We TV reality shows Jim & Chrissy: Vow or Never and Marriage Boot Camp: Reality Stars 10 - Family Edition 2. Nancy returned to Love & Hip Hop: New York for its tenth anniversary season. Nancy also appears in the specials 40 Greatest Love & Hip Hop Moments, Love & Hip Hop Live: The Wedding, and Love & Hip Hop Awards: Most Certified, where she won in the Most Memorable Music Moment category.

=== Season 2 additions ===
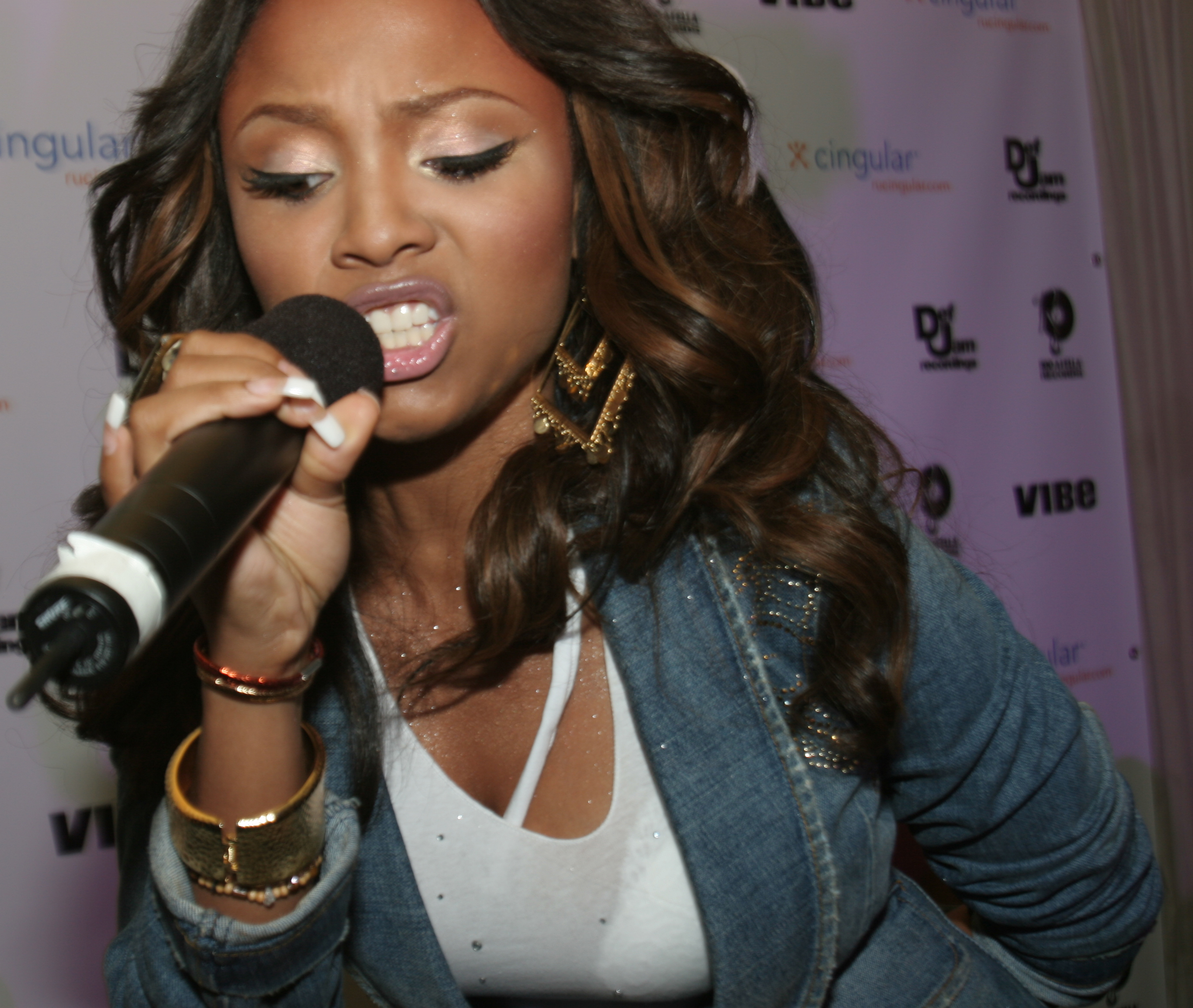
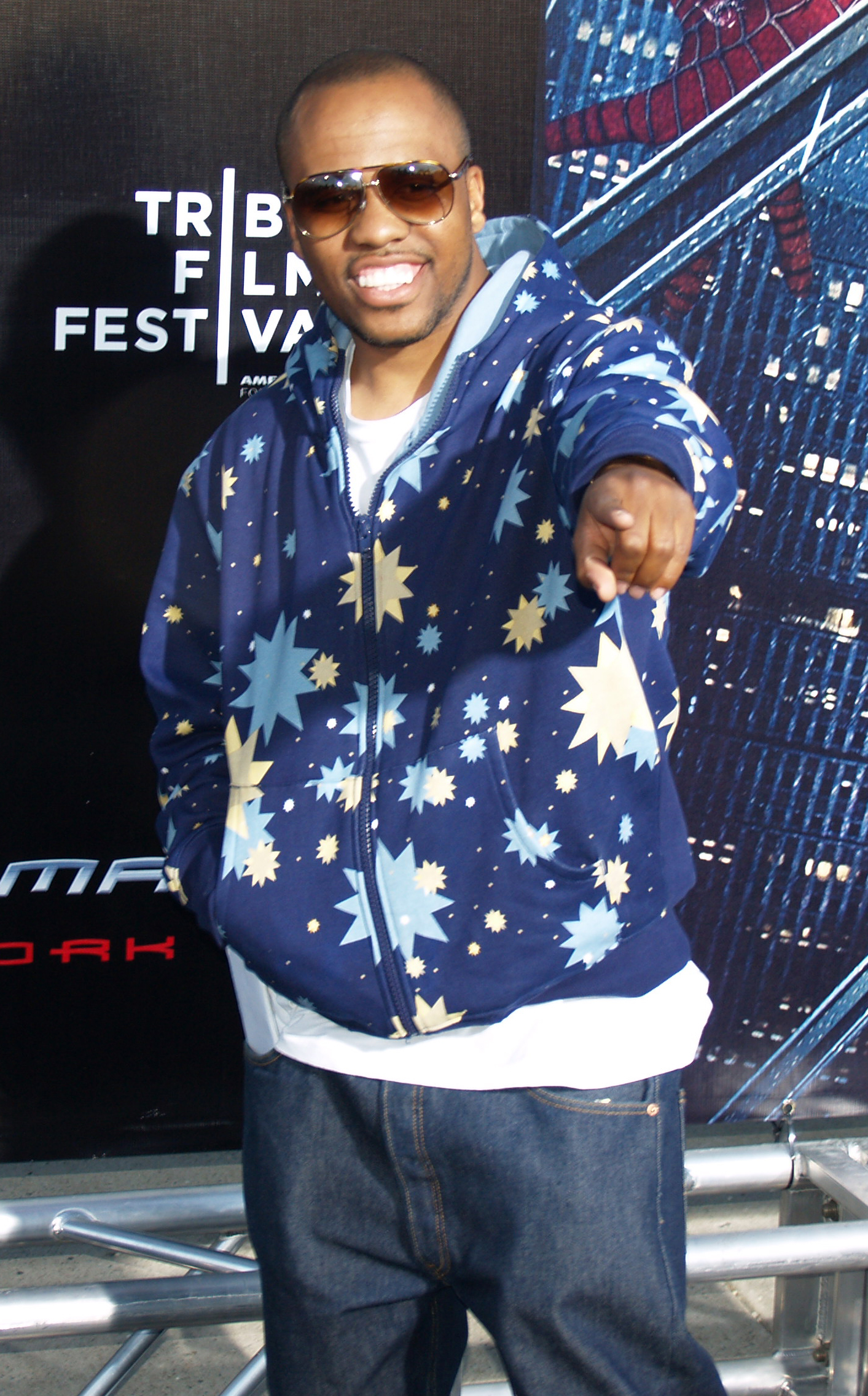
Teairra Marí (top) joins the supporting cast in season two, she is replaced by Consequence (below) and other new cast members in season three.
- Teairra Marí (Season 2) is a R&B/pop singer and actress, originally from Detroit, Michigan. She rose to fame when Jay-Z signed her to Def Jam Recordings at the age of 16, alongside Rihanna. She was dropped from the label in 2006, after poor album sales, and she has struggled to revive her music career ever since. Teairra joins the supporting cast in season two, acting as a friend and confidante to Emily. Several episodes during the season were filmed in Miami, originally intended to set up a spin-off starring Teairra and Erica Mena. She does not return to the show after the season's Miami trip. In 2014, Teairra joined the cast of Love & Hip Hop: Hollywood, becoming one of the show's original eight cast members.

=== Season 3 additions ===
- Mendeecees Harris (Seasons 3, 5–6, guest star in seasons 4, 7–10) is Yandy's boyfriend, who he has been in a relationship with since 2008. He is a real estate entrepreneur and entertainment manager. He was born in Harlem, New York to Panamanian parents. He owns the Beat Factory Studio in The Bronx and manages several NYC-based rappers, such as Vado and Webstar. He has two children from previous relationships, Lil Mendeecees, born to Samantha Wallace in 2005, and Aasim, born to Erika DeShazo in 2011. He also had a casual fling with Rashidah Ali, years before their appearance on the show together. Season three chronicles the birth of Omere, his first child with Yandy, and the couple's engagement. Later in the season, their wedding plans are interrupted when Mendeecees turns himself into custody for multiple drug and trafficking charges. Mendeecees is locked up awaiting sentencing during season four, but continues to make appearances on the show via phone call conversations with Yandy. Mendeecees returns in season five after getting bail, and Yandy gives birth to their second child, Sylar. On May 25, 2015, Yandy and Mendeecees were married live on VH1 as part of the special Love & Hip Hop Live: The Wedding. In season six, Mendeecees is sentenced to eight years in jail and turns himself in again in the finale. While he is behind bars in season seven, Yandy admits that her televised wedding was "symbolic" and that her marriage to Mendeecees is not legal. Mendeeces would continue to make appearances via phone call conversations with Yandy and other cast members in seasons seven through ten. Upon his release from prison on January 29, 2020, Mendeecees and Yandy moved to Atlanta, joining the main cast of season ten of Love & Hip Hop: Atlanta.
- Consequence (Season 3), born Dexter Raymond Mills, Jr., is Jen's longtime boyfriend and the father of her son, Caiden. He is a rapper and record producer. He was born in Queens, New York. He rose to fame through his collaborations with Kanye West. Season three chronicles his struggles in an interfaith relationship as a Muslim. He sparked controversy and criticism during filming when he wrote a song for Lore'l which included the lyrics "light skin is the right skin". After Consequence sucker punched Joe Budden at the season's reunion special, the couple did not return to the show.
- Lore'l (Season 3), born Monica Torres, is a rapper. She was born in Brooklyn, New York, to Puerto Rican parents, and grew up in Maplewood, New Jersey. The third season documents her attempts to kickstart her music career, amid ongoing feuds with Erica Mena and Winter. Since 2016, she has appeared as a co-host on the Lip Service podcast with radio personality Angela Yee.
- Kaylin Garcia (Season 3) is Joe's girlfriend, who he began dating in 2012. She is a Puerto Rican-Thai urban model and video vixen, originally from Homestead, Florida. She appears in a minor supporting role in season three, which chronicles the demise of her relationship with Joe when he reunites with his ex, Tahiry. In 2015, she appeared with Joe on VH1's Couples Therapy.

=== Season 4 additions ===
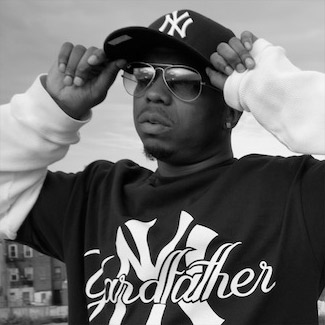
Saigon joins the supporting cast in season four.
- Peter Gunz (Seasons 4–7, 10, guest star in seasons 3, 8), born Peter Pankey, is a Grammy Award-nominated rapper. He was born in The Bronx, New York. He rose to fame as a member of the rap duo Lord Tariq and Peter Gunz. He has been in an off-again, off-again relationship with Tara Wallace since 2000, and is the father of her sons, Jamison, born 2008, and Kaz, born 2012. He has five children from previous relationships, Cory Gunz, Whitney, Brandon, Kennedi and Phoenix. Peter first appears as a guest star in season three, as Rich's friend and confidante. Peter and Tara join the supporting cast in season four, where it is revealed he has married another woman, Amina, behind Tara's back. The dramatic storyline, reminiscent of the love triangle featured on Love & Hip Hop: Atlanta, garnered the highest ratings in the show's history. At the season's reunion special, Amina reveals that she is pregnant with Peter's child. She gives birth to a daughter, Cori, during season five. However, Peter continues to go back and forth between Tara and Amina, leading to a controversial period in season six in which the two women are pregnant at the same time. In season seven, he welcomes Gunner, with Tara, and Bronx, with Amina, his ninth and tenth children. Peter returns as a guest star in season eight, and in a minor supporting role towards the end of season ten, which explores his ongoing feud with Cisco. Peter also appears in the specials The Wedding, Dirty Little Secrets and The Love Edition. In a sneak peek clip of the Love & Hip Hop: Hollywood episode "Matrimony", Peter can be seen briefly in the background while attending Ray J's bachelor party, however he was cut from the episode when it actually aired. Peter also appeared with Amina and Tara in We TV's Marriage Boot Camp: Reality Stars 9.
- Nya Lee (Seasons 4, 9), born Tolley Ingram, is an urban model, video vixen and rapper. She was born in The Bronx, New York, and rose to fame as a stripper. In 2011, she was stabbed in a nightclub brawl by four women, leaving an 18-inch scar across her neck and chest. Season four chronicles her attempts to kickstart her music career, sparking a violent feud with Erica Mena. In April 2016, she gave birth to a daughter, Winner. Despite expressing regret in interviews for ever appearing on the show, Nya returns to the supporting cast in season nine, which chronicles her career struggles, amid feuds with Sidney Starr and Mariahlynn.
- Saigon (Season 4), born Brian Daniel Carenard, is a rapper. He was born in Brooklyn, New York, to an African-American mother and Haitian father. He has at least two children, Rayne Dior, from a previous relationship, and Brian Stephen, with Erica Jean, both born in 2012. The fourth season chronicles his volatile relationship with Erica Jean, and their struggles in raising their child, who is revealed to have developmental disabilities.

=== Season 5 additions ===
- Diamond Strawberry (Season 5) is a model and singer, originally from Los Angeles, California. She is the daughter of baseball player Darryl Strawberry. She has a daughter, MyLisa, born 2007. Season five chronicles her move to New York to pursue her career, as well as a serious relationship with producer Cisco Rosado, who she has been dating for two years. They have a dramatic break up on camera when he discovers that she has been keeping her daughter a secret, and when its revealed that he fathered a child with another woman while they were dating. During the season, she is seduced by Rich, igniting a violent feud with his artist Jhonni Blaze. Diamond sparked controversy and criticism for referring to her daughter as a dog, as well as for a scene where she allegedly has sex with Rich Dollaz in a bathroom.
- Cisco Rosado (Seasons 5–7, 10, guest star in season 3, cameo in season 4) is a music executive and record producer. He was born in Brooklyn, New York, to Puerto Rican parents. He is the father of two children, Tianna and Cisco Rosado Jr., with former girlfriend Tasha. He is a member of the show's self-professed "creep squad", with Rich and Peter. Cisco first appears as a guest star in season three, where he helps Tahiry kickstart a music career. He makes an uncredited cameo in season four, where he is seen in the background of Rich's event. Cisco joins the supporting cast in season five, which chronicles the demise of his relationship with Diamond Strawberry, as well as his struggles to co-parent with estranged baby mama Tasha. He also develops an interest in Cyn, producing a single for her and helping her start a music career, although she gently rejects any romantic advances. In season six, Cisco briefly dates Moe Money, before cheating on her with Mariahlynn. He later admits to only using Mariahlynn to get back at Rich for having sex with Diamond Strawberry the year before. The two make amends in season seven, after learning of his mother's brain aneurysm diagnosis. However, the stress of her health situation causes him to lash out violently at his friends, first at Self, over a contract war with Mariahlynn, and later at Peter, over a business deal gone wrong. After falling out with Rich, Cisco was let go from the show. He returns in a minor supporting role in season ten, where he gets involved in Olivia and Rich's dispute over unpaid song royalties. Cisco also appears as a supporting cast member in season four of Love & Hip Hop: Hollywood, which chronicles his brief, yet turbulent relationship with Teairra Marí, and in the specials Love & Hip Hop New York: Dirty Little Secrets and Love & Hip Hop: The Love Edition.
- Chink Santana (Season 5), born Andre Parker, is a Grammy Award-winning rapper and record producer, originally from Washington, D.C. Chink joins the supporting cast in season five, which chronicles his relationship struggles with socialite Chrissy Monroe. The couple break up at the end of the season.
- Precious Paris (Season 5) is a rapper. She was born in Jamaica, Queens, New York, and is signed to 50 Cent's label G-Unit Records. Paris joins the supporting cast in season five, where she takes on Rich Dollaz as a manager and sparks a violent feud with Jhonni Blaze. She fires Rich as a manager at the end of the season.
- Jhonni Blaze (Season 5), born Jzapal Vonkrishna Jackson, is a R&B singer-songwriter. She was born in Georgia to African-German parents and grew up in Jamaica, Queens, New York. She rose to fame as a stripper and sex worker in Houston, Texas, which lead to a career as an urban model and video vixen, and a brief stint in pornography. In 2014, she made headlines for filing a police report against the rapper Drake for claiming his entourage threatened her life. Season five chronicles her struggles to overcome her controversial past, which has largely overshadowed her music career. She reconnects with Rich, her former flame, and takes him on as a manager. During the season, she clashes violently with Precious Paris and Diamond Strawberry. In February 2016, Jhonni was cast in the proposed spin-off Love & Hip Hop: Houston. However, the show was put on hold indefinitely midway through filming in June 2016 due to concerns for the crew's safety, after several shoots were shut down by cast violence (including a scene involving Jhonni and Just Brittany, where guns were drawn), as well as locals interrupting filming. Jhonni returned to the show in the specials Love & Hip Hop New York: Dirty Little Secrets and Love & Hip Hop: The Love Edition. She filmed scenes for season five of Love & Hip Hop: Atlanta, however they never made it to air, although glimpses of her can be seen in the background. She was set to join the cast again in season seven as Stevie's new artist, serving as a replacement for Joseline Hernandez, however she fell out with show's producers after her Love & Hip Hop: Houston co-star and rival Just Brittany was cast, and she exposed several of the season's upcoming storylines in a series of Instagram posts. Jhonni has made multiple appearances in reality television since her time on the show, including VH1's Black Ink Crew: Chicago and WE TV's Growing Up Hip Hop: Atlanta with fellow Love & Hip Hop alumni Deb Antney and Masika Kalysha.

=== Season 6 additions ===
- DJ Self (Seasons 6–9, cameo appearance in season 2), born Terrence Walker, is a radio personality and DJ at Power 105.1. He was born in Brooklyn, New York, to Nigerian parents. He is the self-professed "Prince of New York" and the CEO of Gwinin Entertainment, whose roster includes fellow cast members Mariahlynn, Major Galore and DreamDoll. He has a daughter, Kayla, with Regina Gamboa, born 2000. Self appears briefly in the first episode of season two, introducing a performance by The Diplomats. He also appears uncredited in an episode of Chrissy & Mr. Jones, while filming a music video with Jim Jones. Self joins the supporting cast of Love & Hip Hop: New York in season six, which chronicles his relationship struggles with girlfriend Yorma Hernandez and his difficulties remaining faithful, after cheating on her with Cardi B and Rose. Seasons seven and eight chronicle the dramas between his artists at his record label, Gwinin, including the feuds between Mariahlynn and Major Galore, and Mariahlynn and DreamDoll. Self returns in one episode of season nine, which chronicles his online feud with Nicki Minaj. During the episode, he is confronted by Nya Lee for underestimating her and is not seen on the show again. He and his girlfriend at the time, Samantha Wallace, Mendeecees' baby mama and Yandy's rival, allegedly filmed several scenes together, including a fight between Samantha and Yandy, however the storyline was left on the cutting room floor. Self also appears in the specials Dirty Little Secrets and The Love Edition.
- Yorma Hernandez (Season 6) is Self's girlfriend. She is an exotic dancer. She was born in The Bronx to Dominican parents and has a sister, Cimary. Season six chronicles her relationship struggles with Self, who she has been dating for a year. They break up later in the season, after she discovers that he has been cheating on her with Cardi B and Rose.
- Rose (Season 6) is a stylist and co-owner of the Beauty Bar Salon & Boutique in New York City. She was born in The Bronx to Dominican parents and has a sister, Rosie. Rose appears in a minor supporting role in season six, where she is enjoys a casual fling with Self, sparking a feud with his girlfriend, Yorma.

=== Season 7 additions ===
- Hennessy Carolina Almánzar (Seasons 7–8, guest star in season 6) is the younger sister of Cardi B. She was born in Manhattan to a Dominican father and Trinidadian mother, and grew up in The Bronx. She makes guest appearances in season six, as her sister's friend and confidante. She joins the supporting cast in season seven, where she acts as a matchmaker for Cardi and her producer Swift. At the reunion, while defending her sister, she gets into a brawl with Major Galore. She left the show to pursue a career as a fashion designer and stylist, however she returned for one episode in season eight. She filmed scenes for two additional episodes, however, her scenes were cut and released on VH1's website as bonus content. Hennessy also competed on MTV's The Challenge: Champs vs. Stars with fellow Love & Hip Hop alumni Daniel "Booby" Gibson.
- Samantha Wallace (Season 7, guest star in seasons 5–6) is the mother of Mendeecees' son, Lil Mendeecees. She was born in Brooklyn, New York to a Puerto Rican father and African-American mother. She dated Mendeecees from 2002 until 2006, and their son was born 2005. She works as a dental hygienist and has a children's clothing line, A Royalé, with Erika. She makes guest appearances in seasons five and six, which chronicle her co-parenting struggles with Mendeecees. She joins the supporting cast in season seven, where her and Erika's strained relationship with Yandy erupts into an all-out war, with Samantha defending herself against accusations of being a "deadbeat" mother. Samantha did not return to the show after the season's reunion special, where she was attacked by an audience member. She allegedly filmed scenes with DJ Self, her boyfriend at the time, for season nine, including a fight with Yandy, however the storyline was left on the cutting room floor.
- J. Adrienne (Season 7), born Judith Scullark, is Snoop's girlfriend of two years. She is an actress, originally from Chicago, Illinois. She gave birth to a son, Wesley, in 2004. She previously appeared as So Hood on the VH1 reality show Real Chance of Love and Charm School. She identifies as heterosexual, claiming she is "only gay for Snoop". The couple break up midway through the season due to J.'s violent jealously, and she is phased out of the show.
- Swift Star (Season 7), born Delroy Ford and also credited as SwiftOnDemand, is Cardi's producer. He was born and raised in Flatbush, Brooklyn. Season seven chronicles his life on tour with Cardi while promoting her mixtape, as well as their subsequent collaborations. Their relationship turns sexual, igniting a violent altercation between Cardi and his British girlfriend Asia.
- DJ Drewski (Season 7, guest star in season 10), born Andrew Loffa, is a radio personality and DJ at Hot 97. He grew up in Elizabeth, New Jersey. He joins the supporting cast in season seven with Sky, who he has been dating for a year. During the season, he is pursued romantically by Bianca, causing a rift in their relationship. At the season's reunion special, he proposes to Sky and she accepts. Drewski returns in a guest role in season ten, where he interviews Phresher for his radio show, and attends Erica and Safaree's wedding.
- Sofi Green (Season 7) is a R&B/pop singer, originally from Washington, D.C. She resides in Brooklyn, New York, where she worked as a host and VJ for MTV2. She joins the supporting cast in season seven. While looking for a manager to kickstart her music career, she engages in some flirty banter with Snoop, sparking an altercation with Snoop's girlfriend J. Adrienne. After joining Snoop's label, Gorgeous Gangster Records, she is phased out of the show and does not attend the season's reunion.
- Sky Landish (Season 7, cameo appearance in season 10) is Drewski's girlfriend of a year. She is a health guru and fitness model. She was born in The Bronx, New York, to Jamaican-German parents. During season seven, Drewski is pursued romantically by Bianca, causing a rift in their relationship. In a memorable scene, she throws a piece of bread at Bianca, calling her a "bird". At the season's reunion special, Drewski proposes to Sky and she accepts. Sky returns in an uncredited cameo in season ten, where she is seen attending Erica and Safaree's wedding with Drewski.
- Kim Wallace (Season 7, guest star in seasons 5–6), also known as Mama Kim, is the mother of Samantha and grandmother to Lil Mendeecees. She grew up in the Marcy Projects in Brooklyn and gave birth to Samantha as a teenager. She had memorable guest appearances in seasons five and six, most notably in a scene where Judy threw a drink at her during an argument, ruining her expensive suit. She joins the supporting cast in season seven, which chronicles her struggles with Yandy and Judy, as well as a dramatic health scare.
- Erika DeShazo (Season 7, guest star in season 6) is the mother of Mendeecees' son, Aasim. She dated Mendeecees from 2003 until 2011, and their son was born in September 2011. She works at a restaurant in Harlem and has a children's clothing line, A Royalé, with Samantha. She makes a guest appearance in season six, during a meeting between the mothers as they prepare for Mendeecees' sentencing. She joins the supporting cast in season seven, where her and Samantha's strained relationship with Yandy erupts into an all-out war, with Erika exposing the truth about Yandy's involvement in the demise of her relationship with Mendeecees.
- Judy Harris (Seasons 7–9, guest star in seasons 5–6, 10) is the mother of Mendeecees and grandmother to his children. She emigrated to Harlem from Panama. Judy had guest appearances in seasons five and six, most notably in a scene where she threw a drink at Samantha's mother Kim during an argument, ruining her expensive suit. She joins the supporting cast in season seven, which chronicles the family's struggles when her son is incarcerated, as well as her increasingly strained relationship with Mendeecees' baby mamas, Samantha and Erika. She begins meddling in Yandy's business in season eight, who in turn exposes her affair with a man named Rob. Judy returns in one episode in season nine, and in a guest role in season ten.
- Asia Cole Davies (Season 7) is Swift's girlfriend of two and a half years. She is a model and beauty entrepreneur, who lives in London, England. She appears in a minor supporting role in season seven, which chronicles the demise of their relationship after she questions his friendship with Cardi, leading to a violent showdown between the two girls. At the reunion, Cardi throws a shoe at her, but later apologises.
- Ashley Trowers (Season 7, guest star in seasons 6, 9) is Rich's daughter, originally from Memphis, Tennessee. Her mother is Miracle Kaye Hall, who also appears on the show. Ashley makes guest appearances in season six, where she reveals to Rich that she has lost her virginity, angering her religious and conservative mother. She appears in a minor supporting role in season seven, where she disapproves of her father's relationship with Jade, and urges him to settle down with someone serious. Ashley returns as a guest star in season nine, where it is revealed that her mother shot her stepfather in a domestic dispute, and is facing jail time. During the season, she considers leaving college to look after her younger siblings.
- Jade Wifey (Season 7), born Jade Watson, is Rich's girlfriend of six months. She is a Jamaican-Italian model and paralegal, originally from Los Angeles, California. During season seven, she clashes with his daughter Ashley, and the couple break up for good after she is confronted by his ex-girlfriend Moniece Slaughter. Jade also appears in a minor supporting role on Love & Hip Hop: Hollywood in season four.
- Moniece Slaughter (Season 7) is Rich's ex-girlfriend. She is a singer-songwriter, originally from Los Angeles, California. She is as a main cast member on Love & Hip Hop: Hollywood and is one of the show's original eight cast members. She attends Yandy and Mendeecees' wedding in the special Love & Hip Hop Live: The Wedding with Rich Dollaz as her date. Their relationship struggles are chronicled in season two of Love & Hip Hop: Hollywood. She appears in a minor supporting role in season seven for two episodes, where she visits New York to expose Rich for trying to rekindle their relationship behind Jade's back. Moniece also appears in a supporting role in season eight of Love & Hip Hop: Atlanta, and in the specials Dirty Little Secrets, The Love Edition, Love & Hip Hop Awards: Most Certified and 40 Greatest Love & Hip Hop Moments: The Reboot.
- Major Galore (Season 7) is a R&B singer. She was born in Queens, New York, to Puerto Rican parents. She appears in a minor supporting role in season seven, where she comes into conflict with Mariahlynn over who should be the "first lady" of Gwinin Entertainment, Self's record label. At the season's reunion special, it is revealed she also has beef with Cardi, which stems from their stripping days together.

=== Season 8 additions ===
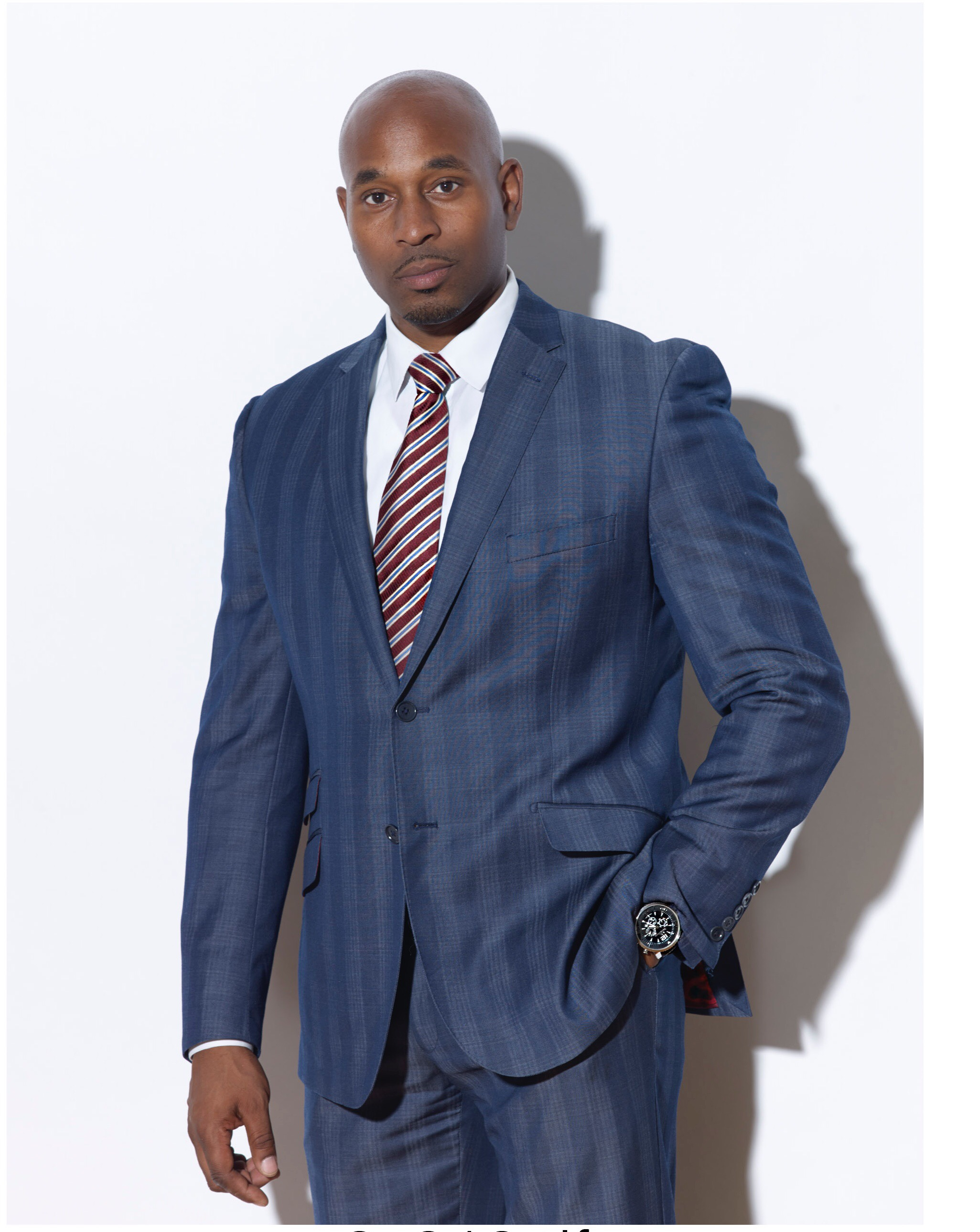
Navarro Gray joins the supporting cast in season eight.
- Navarro Gray (Season 8, guest star in season 9) is an entertainment attorney and talent manager. He was born in Hackensack, New Jersey and became the city's first African-American public defender. He represents several hip hop artists, most notably Fetty Wap. Season eight chronicles his struggles to manage Anaís as she comes into conflict with his girlfriend, Ashley. During the season, Ashley reveals she is pregnant. He returns as a guest star in season nine as Alexis Skyy's lawyer, who he reunites with Fetty.
- Brittney Taylor (Season 8) is a rapper. She was born in Queens, New York, and first rose to fame under the name Bri Beauty, as part of the group The Swag Kids with DJ Webstar. During this period, she ignited a feud with Webstar's former artist, Bianca Bonnie, who viewed her as a copycat. She resides in Miami, Florida, where she is known as Trina's protégé. Season eight chronicles her return to New York. Her and Bianca reignite their nearly decade long feud and get into multiple altercations throughout the season, threatening to derail each other's careers. At the reunion, she gets into a heated argument with Remy Ma over her behavior. In 2019, Brittney made headlines for accusing Remy of assaulting her at a party, the legal fallout is chronicled in the show's tenth season.
- Jaquáe (Seasons 8–9), born James Harris, is a rapper. He was born in Harlem and raised in South Carolina. Jaquáe joins the supporting cast in season eight. He is friends with both Bri and Bianca and attempts to act as a mediator between the two. The season also chronicles his love life, including a failed relationship with Sophia Body, which ends after James R buys her a puppy, and a tumultuous romance with Kiyanne. Season nine briefly touches on their break up when Kiyanne attempts to create tensions between him and Safaree. He also appears as a guest star on the spin-off Remy & Papoose: Meet the Mackies.
- Jonathan Fernandez (Seasons 8–10, cameo appearance in season 2), is an openly gay image consultant, stylist and make-up artist. He was born in New York City to Dominican parents. Jonathan initially worked as a make up artist behind the scenes on both Love & Hip Hop and Love & Hip Hop: Atlanta, where he became friends with K. Michelle. In 2014, he joined the cast of her spin-off K. Michelle: My Life and appeared in all three seasons, as well as an episode of Love & Hip Hop: Atlanta. Jonathan first appears in an uncredited cameo in season two, where he is seen styling Kimbella for a photo shoot. He joins the supporting cast in season eight, which chronicles his romantic struggles with boyfriend Trent, and his up-and-down friendship with Anaís. In one episode, he reveals the horrors he suffered as a child in conversion therapy in the Dominican Republic. In season nine, he has a falling out with Juju over a business dispute, however the two later reconcile. At the reunion, he reveals that he has been struggling with a drug problem. In season ten, Jonathan attempts to act as a mediator between the girls, however this quickly backfires. He is accused of being "messy" by Kimbella and Chrissy when he gets involved in their feud with Yandy, and clashes with Tahiry and Erica Mena over their tensions with Cyn.
- James R. (Season 8, cameo appearance in season 7) is Mariahlynn's boyfriend. He is a R&B singer-songwriter. He was born in Brooklyn to Dominican-Cuban parents. He appears briefly in an uncredited cameo in the opening monologue of season seven, in the background of a street party. James joins the supporting cast in season eight, which chronicles his blossoming romance with Mariahlynn. He clashes with her manager Self, and ends up cheating on her with Sophia Body. During the season, he also gets into a physical altercation with Snoop.
- Ashley Diaz (Season 8) is Navarro's girlfriend, originally from Omaha, Nebraska. She is his business partner in his management company. Season eight chronicles her relationship struggles with Navarro as she clashes with Anaís. During the season, Ashley reveals she is pregnant.
- DreamDoll (Season 8), born Tabatha Robinson, is a rapper. She was born in The Bronx, New York. She gained a social media following while working as a bartender at Starlets in Queens and rose to fame for her appearance on Oxygen's Bad Girls Club. DreamDoll joins the supporting cast in season eight, after joining DJ Self's record label Gwinin Entertainment. She briefly dates Safaree, and during the season, has a violent falling out with label mate, Mariahlynn.
- Sophia Body (Season 8) is Jaquáe's girlfriend. She is a French-Greek urban model, video vixen and DJ, originally from Toronto, Canada. She endured a rough childhood, with an addict mother and incarcerated father, and grew up in Canada's foster care system. She dated Safaree Samuels prior to her appearance on the show. Season eight chronicles the demise of her relationship with Jaquáe, who she has recently started dating. After filming a steamy music video with James R, she is attacked by his girlfriend Mariahlynn, and after further altercations with DreamDoll and Kiyanne, Sophia is phased out of the show and does not attend the reunion.
- Karl Dargan (Season 8) is Mo's husband. He is a boxer. He shares eight children with Mo, and previously appeared with her on R&B Divas: Los Angeles. Season eight chronicles his marital struggles. Mo and Karl do not return to the show after the season's reunion special, but would go on to appear on We TV's Marriage Boot Camp: Reality Stars 12 — Hip Hop Edition with several other Love & Hip Hop couples.
- Grafh (Season 8, cameo appearance in season 4), born Phillip Bernard, is a rapper under Yandy's management. Grafh first appears in an uncredited cameo in season four, as a client of Yandy's, who she introduces to K. Michelle. He appears in a minor supporting role in season eight, where he comes into conflict with Judy after she catches Yandy oiling his elbows. After a few appearances as Jaquáe's friend, he is quickly phased out of the show and does not attend the reunion.
- Ayisha Diaz (Season 8) is Ashley's sister. She is a Dominican urban model and video vixen, originally from Omaha, Nebraska. Ayisha appears in a minor supporting role in season eight. At the reunion, she gets into a heated argument with Anaís.
- Trent Crews (Season 8) is Jonathan's boyfriend. He is a R&B singer-songwriter, originally from Columbus, Ohio. He is openly gay. In season eight, he and Jonathan have a dramatic break up after Jonathan catfishes him and discovers his infidelity.
- Kiyanne (Seasons 8–9) is a rapper. She was born on Long Island and grew up in Queens, New York. Kiyanne joins the supporting cast late into season eight, which chronicles her blossoming yet tumultuous romance with Jaquáe. They break up by season nine, where she returns for one episode, warning Safaree that Jaquáe is not to be trusted.

=== Season 9 additions ===
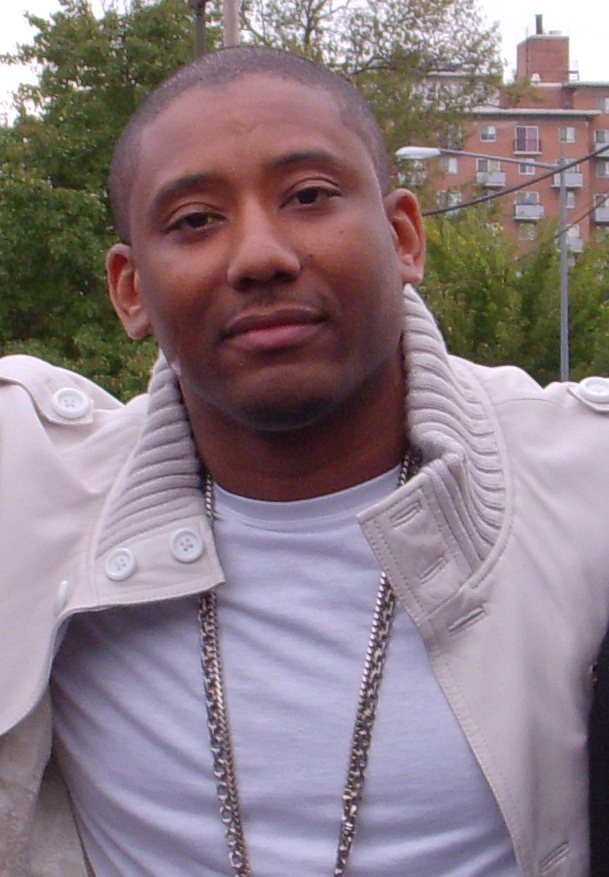
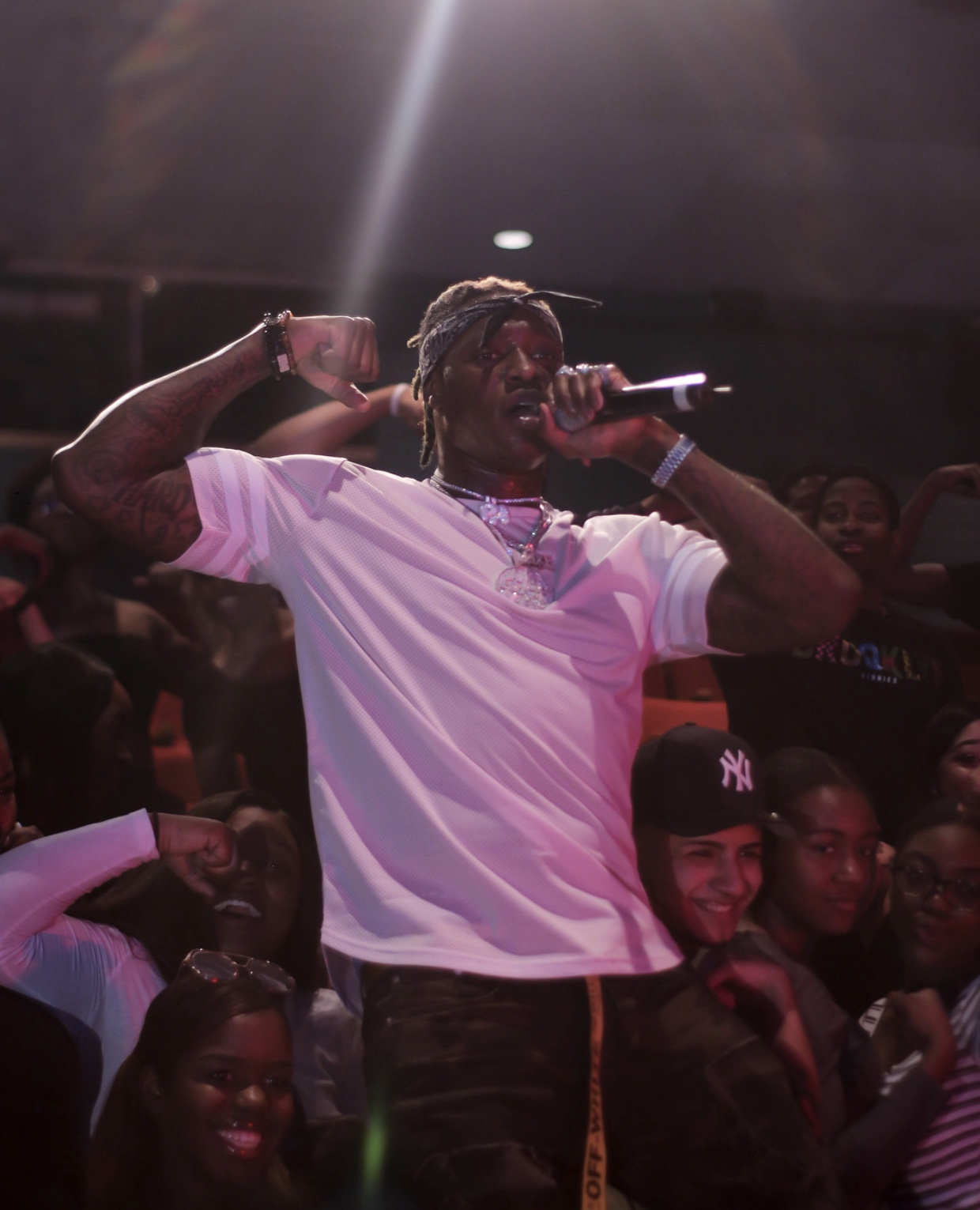
Maino joins the supporting cast in season nine, he is replaced by Phresher and others in season ten.
- Alexis Skyy (Season 9), born Alexis McFarland, is an urban model, video vixen and rapper. She was born on Long Island, New York, to Dominican-Jamaican parents. She worked as a stripper in Atlanta. She came into the public eye through her relationship with Fetty Wap. She has a daughter, Alaiya Grace. She previously made guest appearances on Love & Hip Hop: Atlanta and appeared as a supporting cast member in season four of Love & Hip Hop: Hollywood. Alexis joins the supporting cast of Love & Hip Hop: New York in season nine, after signing a record deal with controversial executive Tr3yway. The season chronicles her struggles as a single parent. Alexis did not return to the show after the season's reunion special, instead joining the cast of Love & Hip Hop: Atlanta in season nine.
- Maino (Season 9, guest star in season 6), born Jermaine Coleman, is a rapper. He was born in Brooklyn, New York. Maino spent 10 years in prison for robbing and kidnapping a drug dealer, before embarking on a rap career after his release in 2003. He filmed scenes during the show's second season while dating Olivia, however, their scenes together were cut and released on the show's website as bonus material. He made a minor guest appearance in season six, as a judge for the showcase where BBOD, Mariahlynn and Bianca perform, and in the spin off show Remy & Papoose: Meet the Mackies. He joins the supporting cast in season nine, with his girlfriend Maggie Carrie. The season chronicles their relationship struggles.
- Sidney Starr (Season 9) is a transgender rapper, originally from Chicago, Illinois. She came into the public eye in 2010 after claiming to have dated the rapper Chingy. Two years later, she admitted it was a lie. She has made many appearances on reality television, including on Lifetime's Atlanta Plastic, E!'s Botched and VH1's Black Ink Crew: Chicago and has also worked as an actress, appearing on FOX's Star. Sidney joins the supporting cast in season nine, where she takes Rich on as a manager, and clashes with Nya Lee. Sidney does not return to the show after the season's reunion special, but appears in an episode of the web series VH1: UnVeiled.
- Maggie Carrie Heckstall (Season 9) is Maino's girlfriend. She is a model, entrepreneur and singer. She was born in Valhalla, New York and endured a rough childhood, having lost her mother in a car accident at a young age and ending up in the foster care system. On May 26, 2016, she was badly wounded in a mass shooting at a T.I. concert in Manhattan. Season nine chronicles her struggles with PTSD, as well as her romantic struggles with Maino.

=== Season 10 additions ===
- Phresher (Season 10), born Kashaun Rameek Rutling, is a rapper. He grew up in the crime-ridden Bamaz Projects in East New York, Brooklyn, raised by Trinidadian parents. He first garnered attention through his collaborations with Remy Ma and Cardi B. He has two children with longtime girlfriend and high school sweetheart Jenn Coreano. In season ten, while embarking on a management career, he pursues Jennaske in hopes of signing her to his record label. This ignites a rivalry with Rich, putting a strain on his relationship with Jenn. Later, it is revealed that he cheated on Jenn with his former artist, Jada, who he allegedly also owes money to. Phresher attracted controversy and criticism from viewers for a scene in which he pressures Jennaske to get plastic surgery, promising that getting her "body done" will help her rap career.
- Jennaske (Season 10), born Rebecca Pierre-Antoine, is a rapper. She grew up in Cambria Heights, Queens, New York, to Arab-Haitian parents. She first garnered attention as a dancer and choreographer for rappers such as Desiigner, Maino and Remy Ma, and through her appearances in music videos, such as Kodak Black's "Snot Thot". Season ten chronicles her struggles to kickstart her rap career, while being pursued by both Rich and Phresher. During the season, she ignites a feud with Phresher's girlfriend Jenn.
- Jenn Coreano (Season 10), is Phresher's longtime girlfriend. The couple have two children together. Season ten chronicles her relationship struggles with Phresher, amid feuds with his artists Jennaske and Jada.

== Guest stars ==
Several members of the cast's inner circle appear as recurring guest stars. They include:

Introduced in season 1

- Cito On The Beat, Somaya's producer, she briefly lives in his studio
- Darrelle Revis, Olivia's ex-boyfriend, who she still claims to be dating, leading to some tension between her and Emily who knows the truth
- Freddie Robinson Jr., comedian, Mama Jones' friend, cast member on Chrissy & Mr. Jones

Introduced in season 2

- Barry, investor, interested in some of Somaya's business ventures and music
- Dirty Swift, producer, Somaya's love interest
- Fabolous, rapper, father of Emily's children
- Sherry Vanderhee, Kimbella's mother
- Rico Love, record producer based in Miami, interested in working with Olivia and Teairra
- Cam'ron, rapper, member of Dipset with Jim and Juelz, Juju's fiancée
- Mona Scott-Young, executive producer of Love & Hip Hop, Yandy's friend and confidante

Introduced in season 3

- Fay Southerland, Joe's mother
- Laura Smith, Yandy's mother
- Ebro Darden, radio personality
- Vado, rapper
- Maurice Talton, personal trainer, Yandy's cousin, gets into a physical altercation with Mendeecees
- Jewel Escobar, Rich's mother
- Tiffany Lewis, Rich's ex-girlfriend, who has a fling with Erica Mena

Introduced in season 4

- Paris Phillips, K. Michelle's friend, cast member on K. Michelle: My Life
- Cory Gunz, rapper, Peter's son
- Ralph Smith, Yandy's father
- Lexie & Ginny Jose, Tahiry's sisters
- J. Dinero, rapper, Yandy's artist, Chrissy Monroe's rival
- Traci Renee, K. Michelle's estranged friend, cast member on K. Michelle: My Life
- Jazz & Sophie Schmahl, Amina's sisters
- Albee Yours, Erica Mena's friend and confidante

Introduced in season 5

- Lisa Strawberry, Diamond's mother
- Maggie Galan, Cisco's mother
- Sonia Mena, Erica Mena's mother
- Tasha, Cisco's estranged baby mama
- Remy, Mendeecees' assistant, Yandy's rival and alleged "stalker"
- Orrin Ennis, Amina's manager and love interest
- Darryl Strawberry, Diamond's father
- Ray Stacks, Cyn's boyfriend

Introduced in season 6

- Miracle Kaye Hall, Rich's ex-girlfriend and Ashley's mother, conservative and religious
- Jace Smith, Remy's son, an aspiring rapper
- Dejanae Mackie, Papoose's daughter, an aspiring rapper
- D.B., Moe's father, successful car salesman
- Tasha Jacoby-Araujo, Mariahlynn's mother, struggles with substance abuse
- Whitney Pankey, Peter's daughter
- Dr. Jeff, therapist who works with Tara, Lil' Mo and Karl
- Talia Coles, stylist, cast member on Chrissy & Mr. Jones
- Irene Mackie, Papoose's mother
- Shaft, Cardi's manager
- Maddy Smith, Remy's mother
- Fat Joe, rapper, Remy's friend and confidante

Introduced in season 7

- Neff Harris, Mendeecees' sister, gets involved in Yandy's feud with Erika and Samantha

Introduced in season 8

- Shirley Samuels, Safaree's mother
- Ruben Brito, Anaís' husband, Rich's rival
- DJ Webstar, Brittney's producer, involved in the feud between Bianca and Brittney
- Fetty Wap, rapper, Navarro's client, Alexis Skyy's baby daddy

Introduced in season 9

- Infinity Gilyard, foster care child, who Yandy adopts

The show also features minor appearances from notable figures within the hip hop industry and New York's social scene, including K-Mack, DJ Vlad, Rage, Freekey Zekey, Funkmaster Flex, Jerry "Wonda" Duplessis, Angela Yee, Stephen Marley, Wyclef Jean, Nick Cannon, Black Ink Crew's Caesar and Dutchess, DJ Kay Slay, Uncle Murda, Charlie Murphy, Migos, Treach, French Montana, Maino, Ice-T, Coco Austin, Keyshia Cole, Sisterhood of Hip Hop's Nyemiah Supreme, John Depp, Method Man, Lil Durk, Noreaga, Konshens, Red Café, Michael K. Williams, Dr. Miami, Trina, Shotti, Danny García, Couple Therapy's Dr. Jenn Mann and Love & Hip Hop: Hollywood's Solo Lucci.

Radio personality Angie Martinez hosted the first season reunion. Executive producer Mona Scott-Young hosted the second and third season's reunions. Comedian Mo'Nique hosted the fourth season reunion. Subsequent seasons are hosted by Nina Parker.
