= State of the Culture =

American late-night talk show

- Genre: Talk show
- Created by: Joe Budden; Sean Combs
- Presented by: Joe Budden; Remy Ma
- Starring: Brandon "Jinx" Jenkins; Scottie Beam; Eboni K. Williams
- Country of origin: United States
- Original language: English
- No. of seasons: 2
- No. of episodes: 32

Production
- Executive producers: Sean Combs; Joe Budden; Lyric Perez
- Producer: Andre Harrell
- Running time: 60 minutes

Original release
- Network: Revolt
- Release: September 10, 2018 – May 5, 2020

State of the Culture is an American late-night talk show created by Joe Budden and Sean Combs, that premiered on September 10, 2018 on Revolt. The show is hosted by Joe Budden and Remy Ma and co-hosted by Brandon "Jinx" Jenkins and Eboni K. Williams, and formerly co-hosted by Scottie Beam.

== Premise ==
State of the Culture "will find hip-hop's most talked about pundit", Joe Budden, "delivering his signature raw, unfiltered, and informative debates and interviews where he digs deeps with prominent artists, celebrities, and personalities."

== Production ==
On May 14, 2018, it was announced that Joe Budden had joined Revolt and was developing the new talk show.

On August 29, 2018, it was announced that the show would premiere on September 10, 2018. Episodes of the series will air each week on Monday though Revolt's online digital platforms and will then broadcast on television a day later every Tuesday on Revolt. The show is also shown on Revolt's YouTube channel.

=== Filming ===
The show is filmed in Jersey City, New Jersey at Parlay Studios.
