= List of Love & Hip Hop: Atlanta cast members =

Love & Hip Hop: Atlanta is the second installment of the Love & Hip Hop reality television franchise. It premiered June 18, 2012 on VH1, and chronicles the lives of several people in Atlanta allegedly involved with hip hop music.The series has a large ensemble cast, with leading cast members in the opening credits, and a sprawling supporting cast, who are credited as "additional cast" or "featured" in the show's end credits. These secondary cast members appear in green screen confessional segments and (for the most part) have the same amount of screen time and storyline focus as the show's main cast members. Over the years, several supporting cast members have been upgraded to lead.

== Cast timeline ==
Main cast (appears in opening credits)
Secondary cast (appears in green screen confessional segments and in end credits alongside the main cast)
Guest cast (appears in a guest role or cameo)

Main cast members
Cast member	Seasons																	
Cast member	1	2	3	4	5	6	7	8	9	10a	10b	11a	11b	12a	12b	13a	13b	
Joseline Hernandez	Starring																	
Erica Dixon	Starring						Recurring		Guest	Recurring								
Rasheeda	Starring																	
K. Michelle	Starring		Guest		Starring (Note: Added to the opening credits from episode four onwards.)			Guest (Note: Appears in the Love & Hip Hop Awards: Most Certified and 40 Greatest Love & Hip Hop Moments: The Reboot specials only.)										
Karlie Redd	Starring																	
Mimi Faust	Starring									Guest (Note: Appears in the Love & Hip Hop Atlanta: Inside the A special only.)	Supporting							
Traci Steele		Starring		Cameo														
Tammy Rivera			Starring	Supporting	Starring		Guest											
Stevie J	Supporting			Starring														
Tommie Lee	Cameo				Supporting	Starring		Cameo										
Jessica Dime				Supporting			Starring											
Erica Mena							Starring	Guest (Note: Appears in the 40 Greatest Love & Hip Hop Moments: The Reboot special only.)	Supporting	Starring								
Spice						Guest	Supporting	Starring										
Scrapp DeLeon			Cameo		Supporting	Guest (Note: As Scrapp was incarcerated during the filming of these seasons, he makes only minor appearances via phone call conversations.)		Starring										
Yung Joc			Supporting					Starring		Supporting	Starring	Supporting		Starring				
Lil Scrappy	Supporting								Starring	Supporting	Starring	Supporting		Starring				
Sierra Gates						Supporting			Starring									
Kirk Frost	Supporting									Starring		Supporting		Starring				
Yung Baby Tate										Starring								
Safaree Samuels								Guest	Supporting	Starring		Supporting						
Omeretta the Great										Starring								
Yandy Smith-Harris								Guest		Starring				Supporting				
Mendeecees Harris										Starring		Supporting						
Kendra Robinson								Supporting		Guest	Starring	Supporting						
Bambi Benson		Guest	Supporting								Starring							
Amy Luciani												Starring		Supporting				
Erica Banks												Starring		Supporting				
Jessica White												Starring		Supporting				
Saucy Santana													Supporting	Starring				
Supporting cast members
Cast member	Seasons																	
Cast member	1	2	3	4	5	6	7	8	9	10a	10b	11a	11b	12a	12b	13a	13b	
Ariane Davis	Supporting																	
Momma Dee	Supporting																	
Shay Johnson	Supporting		Cameo					Guest										
Benzino	Supporting																	
DJ Babey Drew		Supporting																
Waka Flocka Flame			Supporting		Supporting													
Nikko London		Guest	Supporting															
Erica Pinkett		Guest	Supporting															
Kalenna Harper	Guest (Note: Appears in a bonus scene only.)		Supporting															
Dawn Heflin		Guest	Supporting			Guest												
Deb Antney	Guest		Supporting									Guest						
Althea Heart			Supporting															
Tony Vick			Supporting															
Margeaux Simms				Supporting														
Ashley Nicole				Supporting														
Khadiyah Lewis			Guest	Supporting														
Sina Bina				Supporting		Guest		Supporting			Guest							
Tiffany Foxx				Supporting					Guest									
Ernest Bryant				Supporting			Guest		Guest									
PreMadonna				Supporting														
Karen King					Supporting													
Tiarra Becca					Supporting		Supporting											
Chris Gould					Supporting													
D. Smith					Supporting													
Betty Idol					Supporting													
Lyfe Jennings				Guest	Supporting													
Kelsie Frost	Cameo				Supporting	Guest	Supporting		Guest	Supporting								
Shirleen Harvell	Cameo	Guest			Supporting			Guest		Supporting		Guest		Guest				
Sas					Supporting		Guest											
J-Nicks					Supporting													
Amber Priddy					Supporting		Guest											
Melissa Scott						Supporting												
Jasmine Washington						Supporting								Supporting				
Rod Bullock						Supporting								Supporting				
Keanna Arnold						Supporting												
Moriah Lee						Supporting												
Lovely Mimi						Supporting												
Tresure P.						Supporting												
Shooter Gates						Supporting			Supporting									
Gunplay						Supporting												
Estelita Quintero						Supporting												
Savannah Jordan						Supporting			Cameo									
Samantha Lee						Supporting												
BK Brasco							Supporting											
Tokyo Vanity							Supporting											
Tabius Tate							Supporting											
Keely Hill							Supporting											
Just Brittany							Supporting											
Shawne Williams						Guest	Supporting											
K. Botchey							Supporting											
Sean Garrett							Supporting											
Rich Dollaz							Supporting				Supporting			Guest				
Pooh Hicks								Supporting										
Che Mack	Guest							Supporting										
Moniece Slaughter								Supporting										
Shekinah Anderson								Supporting			Supporting							
Akbar V								Supporting										
Cee Cee					Guest			Supporting		Guest			Guest					
Sharonda Official							Guest	Supporting	Guest									
Alexis Skyy					Cameo	Guest			Supporting									
LightSkinKeisha									Supporting									
Ki'yomi Leslie									Supporting									
Cheyenne Robinson								Guest	Supporting									
Ky Frost						Guest			Guest	Supporting	Guest							
Infinity Gilyard										Supporting		Guest						
Jasmine Ellis				Guest				Guest		Supporting		Guest		Guest				
Judy Harris										Supporting		Guest						
Eric Whitehead										Supporting				Guest				
Justin Budd										Supporting	Guest							
Amoni Robinson										Supporting	Guest							
Meda Montana											Supporting	Guest						
Lil Mendeecees										Guest	Supporting	Guest		Guest				
Renni Rucci																		Supporting
Khaotic												Supporting						
Diamond													Supporting					
Mazi												Supporting						
ZellSwag															Supporting			
Lil Zane															Supporting			
Ashley															Supporting			
Ralo														Supporting				
Missy														Supporting				
Blacc Zacc													Guest	Supporting				
Xzavia Thomas														Supporting				
Kai													Guest	Supporting				
T. Davinci (TLO)														Supporting				
Bri														Supporting				
Shakira Hardy															Supporting			
Rayface														Supporting				
24hrs														Supporting				
Salma Slims															Supporting			
Queen Key															Supporting			
Britney Sims															Supporting			

== Main cast members ==
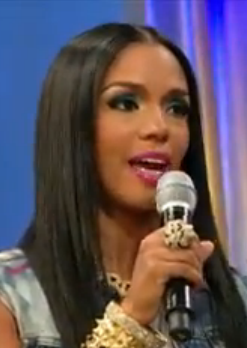
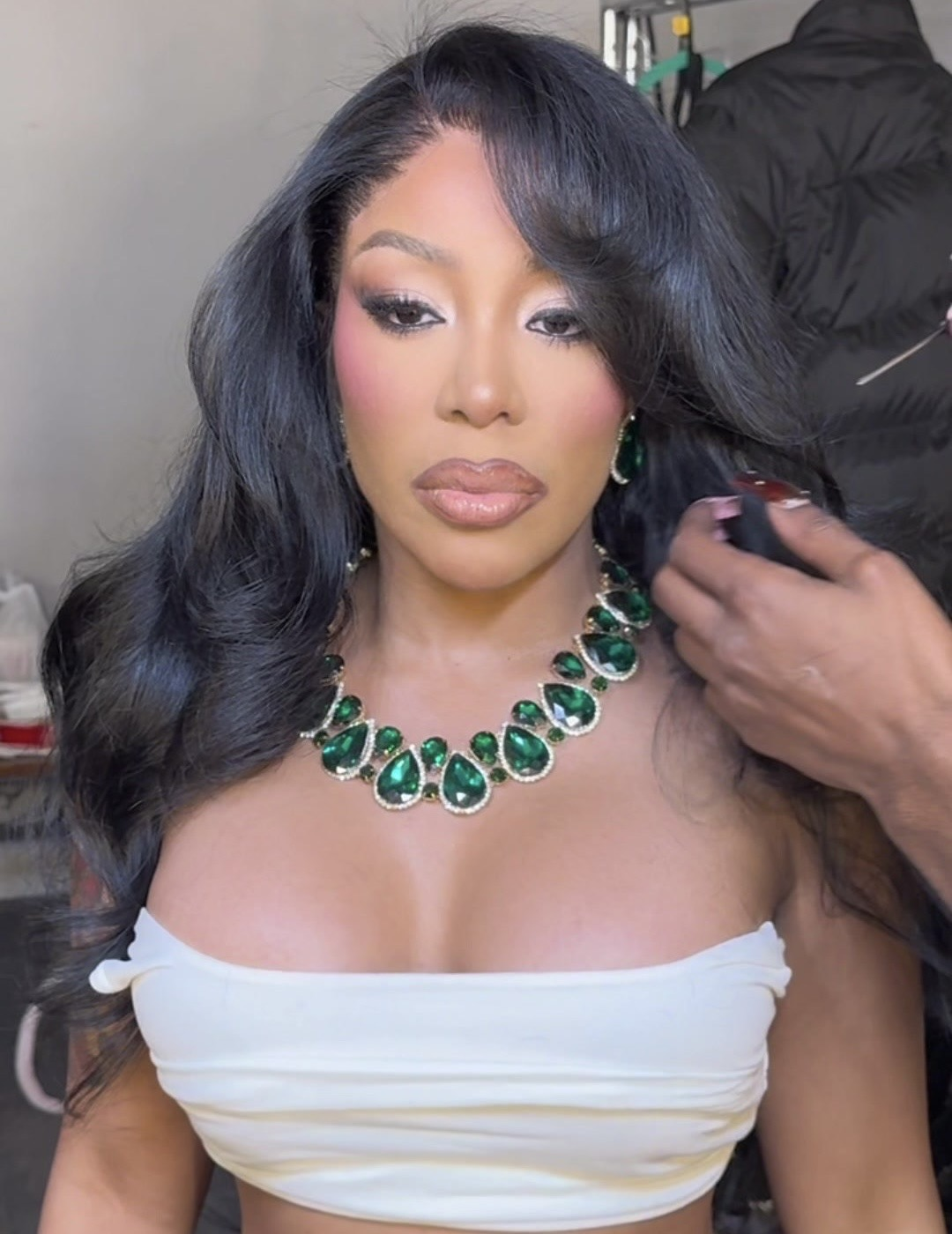
Rasheeda (top) and K. Michelle (below) are original cast members on Love & Hip Hop: Atlanta.

=== Original cast members ===
- Joseline Hernandez (seasons 1–6), known as "The Puerto Rican Princess", is an Afro-Latin rapper and entertainer, originally from Ponce, Puerto Rico. Hernandez endured a rough childhood within the public housing system of Puerto Rico, being exposed to drugs and prostitution at an early age. She moved to Miami, Florida with her family at the age of six. From the age of sixteen, she began stripping in order to provide for her family. During this time, she was arrested in 2003 and 2007 under the name Shenellica Bettencourt, for lewd and lascivious behavior. She eventually relocated to Atlanta, and was discovered by Stevie J while performing as a stripper at the Onyx Club. Joseline is introduced on the show as an aspiring rapper and recording artist under Stevie's management. It is eventually revealed that the two are sexually involved after Joseline finds herself pregnant, and decides to have an abortion. This ignites a feud with Stevie's girlfriend Mimi, which drives several storylines over the next seasons. At the start of season 3, she and Stevie claim to have secretly eloped months prior, much to the skepticism of the other cast members. Season 5 chronicles the couple's break up, after Stevie admits that their marriage was faked for publicity. At the season's reunion special, Joseline reveals she is pregnant with Stevie's child. The birth of their daughter, Bonnie Bella, is chronicled in her sixth and final season. Hernandez dramatically quit the show during taping of the season's reunion special, amid tensions with executive producer Mona Scott-Young. Joseline was reported to be making up to $400,000 per season prior to quitting the series. She also appeared in the spin-off shows Stevie J & Joseline: Go Hollywood and K. Michelle: My Life, and in the specials Dirty Little Secrets, Love & Hip Hop Live: The Wedding, Joseline's Special Delivery, Dirty Little Secrets 2 and The Love Edition. In 2020, she briefly returned to the franchise as a main cast member in season 3 of Love & Hip Hop: Miami.
- Erica Dixon (seasons 1–4, supporting cast member in seasons 7–8, 10–12, guest star in season 9) is the mother of Lil Scrappy's daughter, Emani. She was in an on-again, off-again relationship with Scrappy for twelve years. The first four seasons chronicle her relationship struggles with Scrappy, including a brief engagement and disputes over child support payments, as well her struggles with her mother, Mingnon, a recovering crack cocaine addict. In season 3, she briefly dates model O'Shea Russell. After a two year hiatus, Erica returned to the show in a supporting role from season 7, having made peace with Momma Dee and holding no grudges regarding Scrappy's and Bambi's recent marriage and pregnancy. Season 8 chronicles the pregnancy and birth of her twin daughters, Embrii and Eryss. Erica also appears in Family Reunion: Love & Hip Hop Edition (with Emani) and the special Inside the A.
- Rasheeda Buckner-Frost is a rapper and entrepreneur, originally from Decatur, Illinois. She is the self-professed "Georgia peach" and "queen of crunk", who rose to fame with her 2007 single "Got That Good (My Bubble Gum)". Rasheeda married music manager Kirk Frost in 1999. They share two sons, Ky and Karter. The first season chronicles her career struggles as an underground rapper with a manager husband. She is initially portrayed as K. Michelle's close friend and confidante, however the two fall out after Rasheeda expresses doubts about Michelle's abuse allegations. Their feud continues into season 2, with Michelle throwing a lit candle in her direction during a heated argument in an early episode. Later in the season, Rasheeda discovers she is pregnant, and in what would become of the show's most controversial storylines, Kirk reacts by telling her to get an abortion, before cheating on her on camera with two women. In season 6, her marriage is again thrown in turmoil when she discovers Kirk has fathered a baby with Jasmine, a stripper. Since 2013, Rasheeda and Kirk Frost have regularly been criticised and accused of fabricating their storylines to stay on the show. In 2018, Rasheeda was reported to be making up to $25,000 per episode. She also appears with Kirk in the specials Dirty Little Secrets, Love & Hip Hop Live: The Wedding, Dirty Little Secrets 2, The Love Edition and Love & Hip Hop: Secrets Unlocked, as well as VH1 Couples Retreat with other Love & Hip Hop couples.
- K. Michelle (seasons 1–2, 5, guest star in seasons 3–4), born Kimberly Michelle Pate, is a R&B/soul singer-songwriter, originally from Memphis, Tennessee. The first season chronicles her return to the music industry after several personal struggles, including an abusive relationship with a music executive. Michelle was dubbed the show's breakout star, signing a multi-album record deal with Atlantic Records shortly after filming. The second season chronicles the recording of her debut studio album, Rebellious Soul, amid violent feuds with Rasheeda, Karlie and Mimi. During the season's reunion special, Michelle announced that she was leaving the show to join the cast of Love & Hip Hop: New York in season 4. Her purpose on the show was mainly served to set up her own spin-off series, K. Michelle: My Life, which premiered November 3, 2014. She would continue to make guest appearances on Atlanta in seasons 3 and 4, before rejoining the main cast in season 5, which chronicles her return to Atlanta and the release of her third album, More Issues Than Vogue. After appearing infrequently throughout the season and barely interacting with the cast, Michelle quit the show shortly after taping the season's reunion special. K. Michelle: My Life ended after three seasons, and she joined the cast of Love & Hip Hop: Hollywood in season 5. Michelle also appears in clip show specials Love & Hip Hop Awards: Most Certified (where she won the Clapback Queens category) and 40 Greatest Love & Hip Hop Moments: The Reboot.
- Karlie Redd (seasons 1–9, 12; supporting cast member in seasons 10-11), born Keisha Senel Lewis, is a Trinidadian-American entertainer and entrepreneur, originally from New York City. Karlie is introduced as an aspiring rapper, singer and recording artist, hoping to collaborate with Stevie J. She quickly gains a reputation among the cast for being "messy" and allegedly lying about her age. Her rivalry with K. Michelle is the focus of the first two seasons, during which she released "Bring It", a diss track aimed at Michelle. The two later reconcile their differences. Subsequent seasons chronicle her various business ventures, as a soap opera actress, boutique store owner, record label executive, Playboy model and morning radio host. Karlie's chaotic love life has become one of the show's leading storylines and she has been romantically linked with many of the show's male cast members, including Benzino, Yung Joc, Scrapp DeLeon, Lyfe Jennings and Sean Garrett. In season 6, Karlie briefly dates tattoo artist Ceaser Emanuel, their relationship serving as a crossover with fellow VH1 reality show Black Ink Crew. In season 8, she announces her engagement to trucking mogul Arkansas Mo. After their secret marriage ends in divorce, she begins dating Lamar Odom. In 2018, Karlie was reported to be making up to $50,000 per season. She also appears in the spin-offs K. Michelle: My Life and VH1 Family Reunion: Love & Hip Hop Edition (with her daughter Jasmine), and the 2019 clip show specials Love & Hip Hop Awards: Most Certified and 40 Greatest Love & Hip Hop Moments: The Reboot.
- Mimi Faust (seasons 1–9, supporting cast member in season 10), born Oluremi Fela James, is the mother of Stevie J's daughter, Eva, originally from Newport News, Virginia. She was in an on-again, off-again relationship with Stevie for fifteen years. Mimi endured a rough childhood, having been abandoned in Los Angeles, California, by her Scientologist mother at the age of 13. In the 1990s, she was Claudia Jordan's roommate and appeared as a video vixen in music videos for Pharrell Williams and Kelly Price. In 2001, she founded her own cleaning service. During the series, she also embarks on a career as an entertainment manager, author and interior designer. The first season chronicles the demise of her relationship with Stevie, after it is revealed that he has been cheating on her with his artist, Joseline. In season 2, she enters a relationship with Nikko London, much to the disapproval of her best friend Ariane. The couple's allegedly leaked, highly publicised sex tape, distributed by Vivid Entertainment, is the leading storyline of seasons 3 and 4, Mimi later admits to her friends that the tape was staged. At the fourth season's reunion, it is revealed that her love triangle with Stevie and Joseline was the result of a threesome, well before the show made it to air. In season 5, Mimi admits that she is sexually fluid, and enters a relationship with Chris, who would later reveal his identity as a trans man. The two eventually break up, and at the reunion, she reveals that she has started dating a woman. Her girlfriend is later revealed to be basketball player Ty Young, who appears on the show in seasons 7 and 8. In 2018, Faust was reported to be making up to $100,000 per season. She starred in nine seasons of Love & Hip Hop: Atlanta, and appears in a supporting role in the spin-off shows Stevie J & Joseline: Go Hollywood and Leave It to Stevie, as well as in the specials Love & Hip Hop Awards: Most Certified (where she won the Romance Gone Wrong category), 40 Greatest Love & Hip Hop Moments: The Reboot and Inside the A.

=== Season 2 additions ===
- Traci Steele (season 2, cameo appearance in season 4) is a DJ and radio personality, originally from The Bronx, New York City. Steele was in a relationship with DJ Babey Drew for four years before breaking up while she was pregnant. She gave birth to Drew's son, "Little Drew", in 2007. Season 2 chronicles her co-parenting struggles with Drew, including jealously over Drew's taste in women (Traci calls them "popcorn hoes"), and a failed attempt at opening a sneaker boutique together. She briefly dates fitness model DaShaun Johnson, but the two part ways after Drew exposes his criminal past. She is initially friends with Shay, however the two have a falling out when Shay turns violent at one of her events, and Traci is caught in the crossfire. Traci and Drew were not well-received by viewers, who dubbed them "boring" compared to the other cast members, and the two were fired from the show. She appears in a cameo in season 4, where attending Rasheeda's store opening.

=== Season 3 additions ===
- Tammy Rivera (seasons 3, 5–6, supporting cast member in season 4, guest star in season 7) is a fashion designer and stylist, originally from Baltimore, Maryland. She came into the public eye through her relationship with rapper Waka Flocka Flame, who she began dating in 2011. Tammy was born in Tappahannock, Virginia, to an African-American mother and a Nicaraguan father, who was incarcerated shortly after she was born. She gave birth to a daughter, Charlie, in 2005. Season 3 chronicles her relationship struggles with Waka, including past infidelities and the suicide death of Waka's brother, Kayo Redd. Later in the season, the couple elope. After a violent altercation with Joseline at the reunion, Tammy is absent from the show, eventually returning as a supporting cast member for three episodes towards the end of season 4. She rejoins the main cast in season 5, which chronicles the launch of her swimwear line, and her feud with trans woman D. Smith, who clash over Waka's controversial comments regarding trans people. Later in the season, she reveals that she has separated from Waka due to his infidelity. The couple eventually reunite in season 6 and Tammy embarks on a music career. Since 2017, Tammy has achieved relative success as an R&B singer, with several of her songs charting on iTunes.

=== Season 4 additions ===
- Stevie J (seasons 1-9), born Steven Aaron Jordan, is a Grammy Award-winning record producer, singer and songwriter, originally from Buffalo, New York. He rose to fame in the 1990s as an in-house producer and writer for Puff Daddy's Bad Boy Records. Stevie has six children, Dorian, Sade, Steven Jr., Savannah, Eva (with Mimi) and Bonnie Bella (with Joseline), all who have made appearances on the show. Stevie appears in every episode of the first three seasons as a supporting cast member, his turbulent love triangle with baby mama Mimi and aspiring artist Joseline fuelling many of the show's storylines. He is promoted to the main cast in season 4, which chronicles his legal issues at the time, including a stint in rehab for cocaine addiction. Later in the season, he and Joseline secure a movie deal in Los Angeles, setting up their spin-off show Stevie J & Joseline: Go Hollywood, which would premiere January 25, 2016. When the film's financing falls through, the couple return to Atlanta in season 5 on bad terms. They break up by the end of the season, and at the season's reunion special, Joseline reveals she is pregnant with his child. Stevie's life as a bachelor is explored in the spin-off show Leave It to Stevie, which ended after two seasons. On July 18, 2018, it was reported that Stevie J had married Faith Evans in Las Vegas. Subsequently, Stevie appears infrequently in season 8 and 9, before disappearing from the series altogether.

=== Season 6 additions ===
- Tommie Lee (seasons 6–7, supporting cast member in season 5, cameo appearances in seasons 1, 8), born Atasha Chizzaah Jefferson Moore, is an urban model, socialite and rapper. Tommie has two daughters, Havali and Samaria, from previous relationships. She has had multiple legal issues in the past and gave birth to one of her daughters while incarcerated. Tommie first appears in an extra in season 1, where she is seen attending Rasheeda's listening party. She joins the supporting cast of season 5 as the girlfriend of rapper Scrapp DeLeon, which chronicles their turbulent relationship and her violent rivalry with his baby mama Tiara. The couple later part ways after he is jailed for marijuana trafficking. Later in the season, she ignites an intense feud with Joseline, which culminates in an off-camera incident in which Tommie attempted to run down Joseline with her car. Despite this incident, she is promoted to the main cast in season 6, which chronicles the launch of her wine line, complicated by her struggle with alcoholism. Her drinking problems continue into season 7, straining her already volatile relationship with mother Samantha and sister Versace, and threatening to derail a potential rap career. In the eleventh episode, "Houston We Have A Problem", one scene shows an intoxicated Tommie Lee breaking the fourth wall and attacking a producer, as well as security. In an unusual move, executive producer Stephanie Gayle announced to the cast on camera that Tommie was no longer allowed on set, effectively firing her from the show. However, she returned to the show two episodes later, on the condition that she not drink on set. On October 18, 2018, Tommie was arrested for allegedly attacking her daughter at her high school while heavily intoxicated. On January 3, 2019, while facing up to 54 years behind bars for the crime, Tommie confirmed that she would not be returning to the show. She would appear briefly in unseen archival footage in the eighth season's premiere. In 2018, Tommie was reported to be making up to $17,000 per season. She also appears in a supporting role in the spin-off Leave It to Stevie. In September 2020, at the age of 36, Tommie became a grandmother after her daughter Samaria gave birth to her first child.

=== Season 7 additions ===
- Jessica Dime (season 7, supporting cast member in seasons 4–6), born Jessica Chatman, is a rapper, originally from Memphis, Tennessee. She relocated to Atlanta from Miami, where she worked as a stripper at the infamous King of Diamonds Gentleman's Club. Dime joins the supporting cast of season 4 as a rival of Joseline, which stems from their stripper days in Miami together. She briefly takes Mimi on as a manager and clashes with Tiffany Foxx. In season 5, she briefly dates Lil Scrappy, igniting a feud with Bambi. In season 6, she enters a relationship with NBA player Shawne Williams. While vacationing in Jamaica, he proposes and she accepts. Dime is promoted to the main cast in season 7, which documents her new engagement and her pregnancy with her first child, Blessing Briel’ Williams, who she gives birth to in the season finale. During filming, she publicly criticised Mona Scott-Young for passing on a proposed wedding special starring her and Shawne. Subsequently, she was phased out of the show and did not attend the season's reunion. Dime also appears in two episodes of the spin-off show K. Michelle: My Life, and would also appear in We TV's Marriage Boot Camp: Hip Hop Edition with several other Love & Hip Hop cast members.
- Erica Mena (seasons 7, 10-11, supporting cast member in season 9) is a former video vixen, socialite and aspiring singer, originally from The Bronx, New York City. She appeared previously on Love & Hip Hop: New York. Mena joins the cast in season 7, relocating to Atlanta after her failed engagement to Bow Wow, hoping to kick-start her music career. She reconnects with her old friend Estelita and tries to steer her clear away from Stevie J, who she views as exploitive and manipulative. Mena returns in seasons 9 and 10, after getting married and having a baby with Safaree Samuels. She also appears in the clip show special 40 Greatest Love & Hip Hop Moments: The Reboot. Season eleven revolves around her divorce from Safaree and subsequent custody battle. On September 1, 2023, after causing controversy for calling Spice a "monkey" during a heated exchange, it was reported that Mena had been fired from the show, effective immediately.

=== Season 8 additions ===
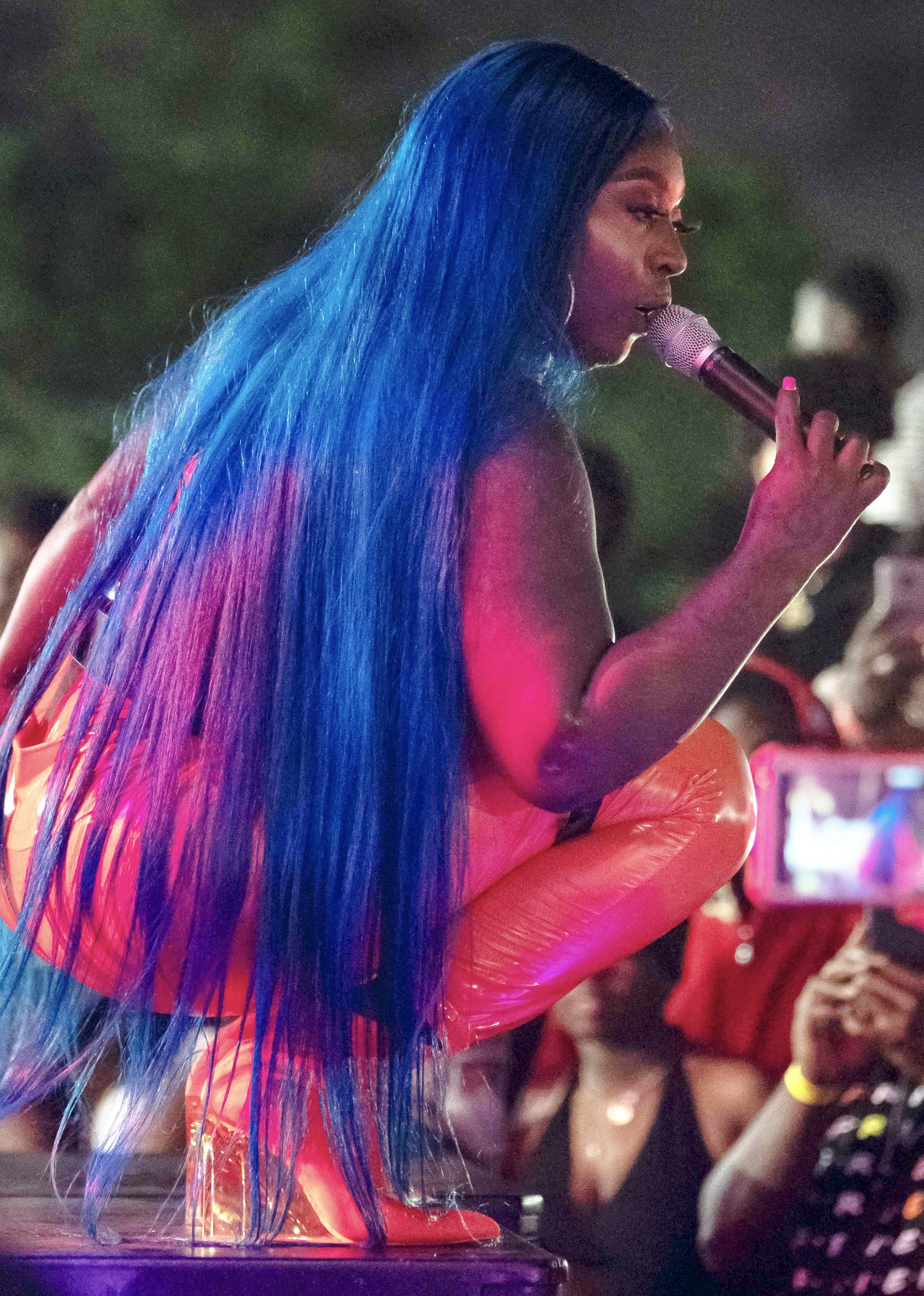
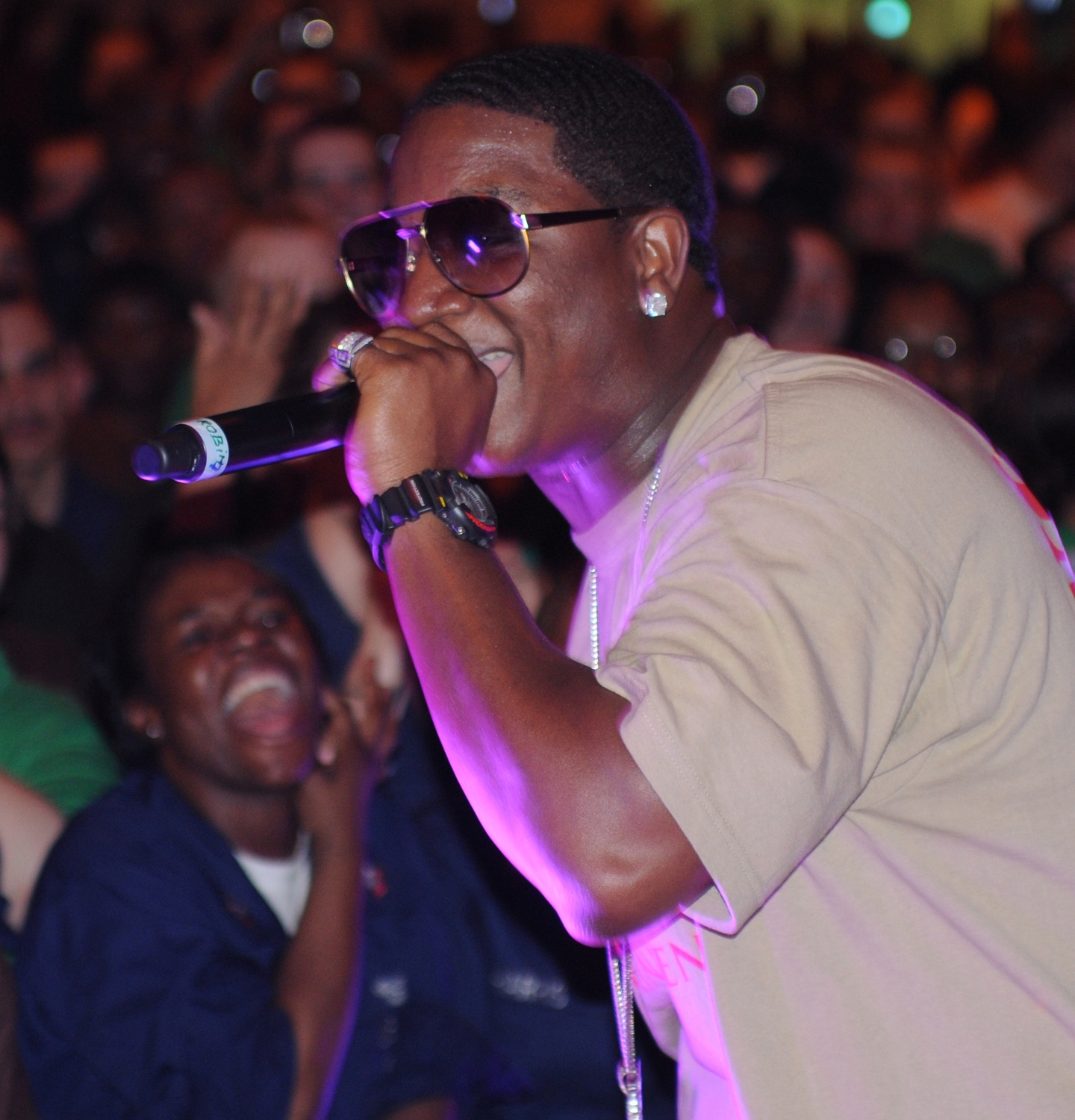
Spice (top) and Yung Joc (below) join the main cast of Love & Hip Hop: Atlanta season 8.
- Spice (seasons 8–12, supporting cast member in season 7, guest star in season 6), born Grace Latoya Hamilton, is a dancehall recording artist, singer and songwriter, originally from Jamaica. She rose to fame in her home country for her collaborations with Vybz Kartel and for her hit single, "So Mi Like It". Spice first appears as a guest star in season 6, when she performs for the cast during their trip to Jamaica. She joins the supporting cast in season 7, after moving to Atlanta to kickstart her international career. She briefly dates Tabius, sparking a violent feud with his ex-girlfriend Tokyo Vanity, which intensifies after she makes derogatory comments about Tokyo's weight. The two later reconcile and become friends. Spice is promoted to the main cast in season 8, which chronicles her struggles with colourism as a dark-skinned woman. She begins considering skin bleaching to prove a point on "black hypocrisy", putting her in conflict with the other cast members.
- Scrapp DeLeon (seasons 8–9, supporting cast member in season 5, guest star in seasons 6–7, cameo in season 3), born Will Cortez Robinson, is a rapper. He rose to fame at a young age as a member of the rap group Da Razkalz Cru, with his brother Sas and his cousin Dolla. In 2009, Deleon witnessed the shooting death of Dolla. In 2012, he was accused of the kidnapping, assault and attempted murder of his stepfather. He, along with his mother Karen and brother Sas, were later cleared of all charges. Deleon first appears in a cameo in season 3, where he is seen attending Stevie and Joseline's party. He joins the supporting cast in season 5, which chronicles the dramatic love triangle between him, his girlfriend Tommie and his baby's mother Tiarra, reminiscent of his "uncle" Stevie's earlier relationships with Mimi and Joseline. Midway through the season, he enjoys a casual fling with Karlie. During filming, Scrapp surrendered himself into custody for a marijuana trafficking charge. While incarcerated, he makes appearances in seasons 6 and 7 via phone calls with Karen and the other cast members. Scrapp is promoted to the main cast in season 8, which chronicles his release from jail and his reunion with his family, including with his estranged father Big Will. While living in a halfway house, he begins dating Moniece Slaughter. This provokes a violent reaction from Tiarra, who was hoping to rekindle their relationship. He and Moniece break up midway through the season after he has an off-camera reunion with Tommie. Later, he develops an interest in Sierra, however the two never venture beyond friendship.
- Yung Joc (seasons 8–10, supporting cast member in seasons 3–7), born Jasiel Amon Robinson, is a Grammy Award-nominated rapper, comedian and radio personality. Joc has eight children to four different women, including Sina Bina, who also appears on the show. He is the cousin of Momma Dee and cousin-uncle of Lil Scrappy. Joc joins the supporting cast in season 3, where he is introduced as Karlie's new man. They break up during the season, when it is revealed that he has been cheating on her with his assistant Khadiyah. Subsequent seasons chronicle his romantic dramas, including Khadiyah's feud with his baby mothers in season 4 and his fling with J-Nicks' girl Amber Priddy in season 5. In season 6, he is living on a llama farm and has rekindled his relationship with Karlie. They break up again due his difficulties remaining faithful, although the two continue a flirtation throughout season 7. Joc is promoted to the main cast in season 8, where it has revealed that he has been in a serious relationship with attorney Kendra Robinson for years. In the season finale, he proposes and she accepts. Joc also appears in the spin-off shows Leave It to Stevie and VH1 Family Reunion: Love & Hip Hop Edition (with his son Amoni), and the 2019 clip show specials Love & Hip Hop Awards: Most Certified (where he won the Sex, Lies & Videotape category) and 40 Greatest Love & Hip Hop Moments: The Reboot.

=== Season 9 additions ===
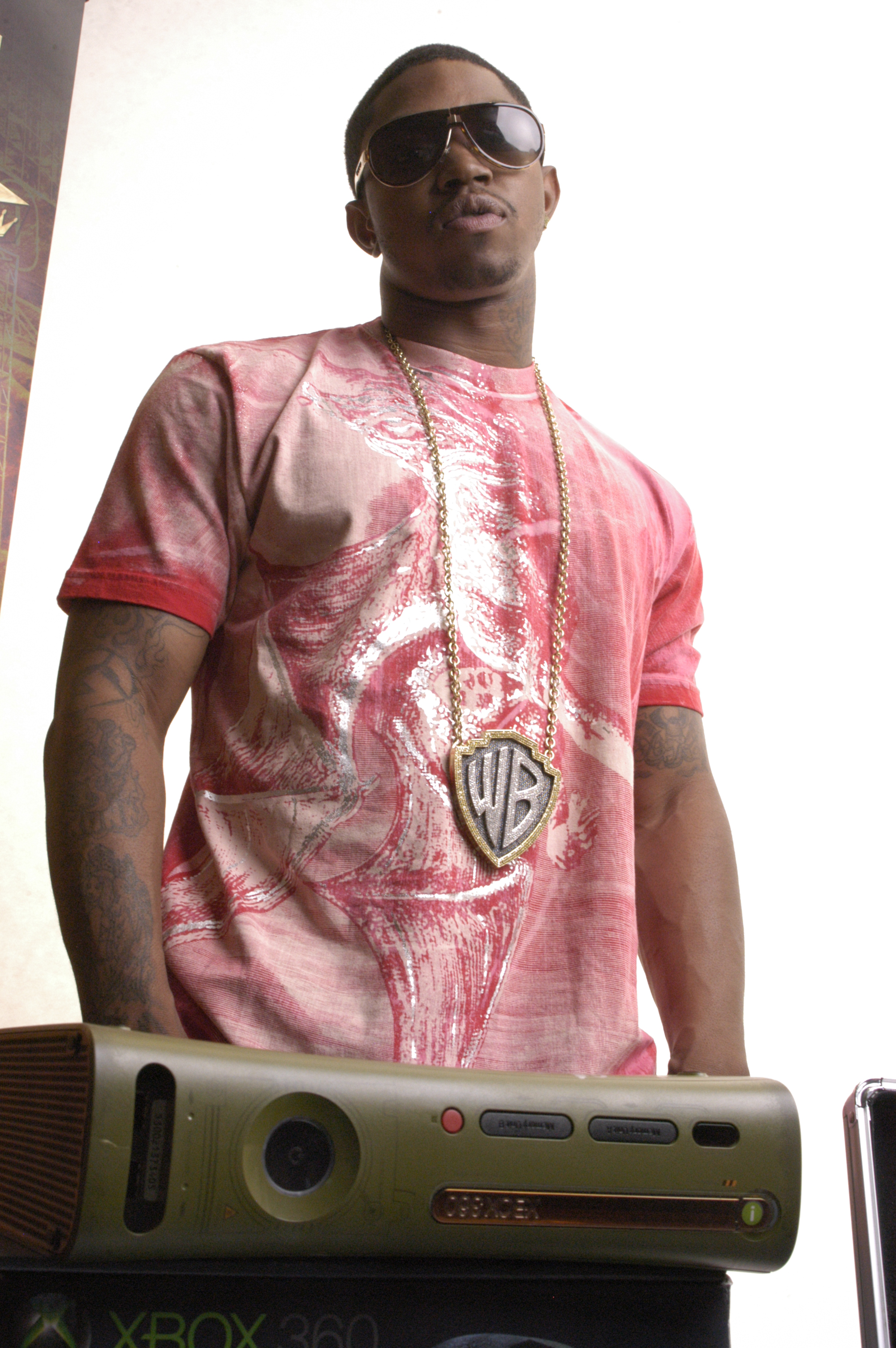
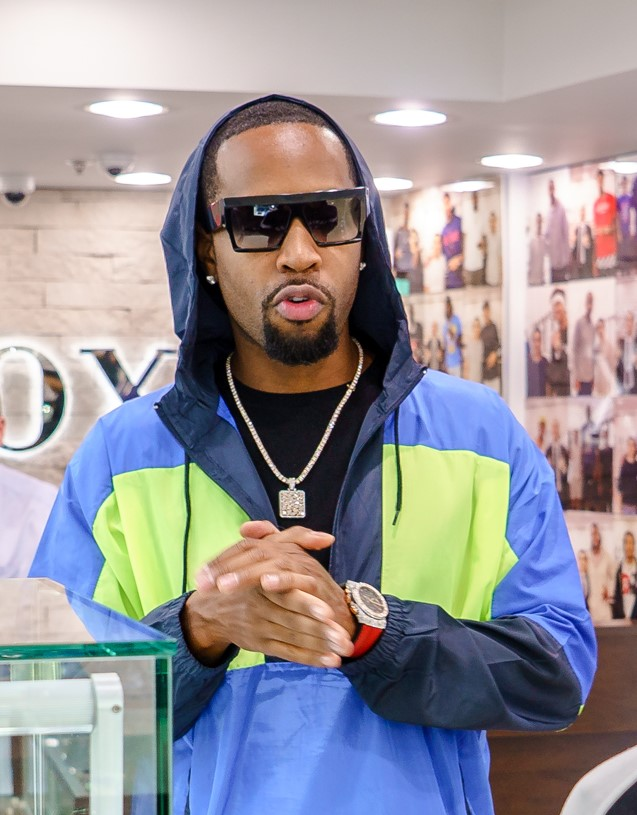
Lil Scrappy (top) joins the main cast of Love & Hip Hop: Atlanta in season 9, he is replaced by Safaree Samuels (below) and other new cast members in season 10.
- Lil Scrappy (seasons 9–10, supporting cast member is seasons 1–8), born Darryl Kevin Richardson II, is a rapper. He is self-professed "Prince of the South" who rose to fame in 2006 with his hit single "Money in the Bank". Scrappy first appears on Love & Hip Hop: Atlanta as a supporting cast member, his love life driving many of the show's storylines throughout the series. The first two seasons chronicle his relationship struggles with baby mama Erica Dixon, including a brief engagement and a stint in rehab for marijuana addiction. During this time, he enjoys a "friends-with-benefits" relationship with Shay Johnson, igniting a feud between the two women. In season 3, he has moved on from Erica and started dating Bambi Benson, who suffers a miscarriage in an early episode. Scrappy begins confiding in Erica Pinkett, igniting multiple altercations between the two women. He and Bambi have broken up by season 5 and he pursues romances with Betty Idol and Jessica Dime. However, by the season finale, Scrappy wins Bambi back with a proposal which she accepts. They call off the engagement in season 6, and Scrappy decides to relocate to Miami. Scrappy then appears in a minor supporting role in season 1 of Love & Hip Hop: Miami, where he attempts to rekindle his relationship with Shay, while having a flirtation with Chinese Kitty. Scrappy and Bambi reunite offscreen, getting married in Las Vegas on September 8, 2017. They return for three episodes in season 7, where Bambi reveals she is pregnant with their first child. She gives birth to his son, Breland, during season 8. The season also chronicles the aftermath of a near fatal car crash he endured in Miami, which left him hospitalised. After appearing as a supporting cast member in every season prior, Scrappy is promoted to main cast in season 9, which chronicles his struggles to get his mother, Momma Dee, to confront her drinking problem. Scrappy also appears in the spin-off shows Leave It to Stevie and VH1 Family Reunion: Love & Hip Hop Edition, in one episode of Love & Hip Hop Atlanta: After Party Live! and in the specials Dirty Little Secrets, 40 Greatest Love & Hip Hop Moments, The Wedding, Dirty Little Secrets 2 and The Love Edition. In 2018, Scrappy was reported to be making up to $200,000 per season.
- Sierra Gates (seasons 9–10, supporting cast member in seasons 6–8) is a beauty entrepreneur who owns The Glam Shop, a hair, nail and beauty salon. Gates had her first child, Paris, at the age of 15, and also has a son, Mason, with ex-husband Rod "Shooter" Gates. Gates first appears as a supporting cast member in season 6, in which her marriage falls apart when she discovers that Shooter has been having an affair with her assistant Moriah. By season 7, she has separated from Shooter and started dating rapper BK Brasco, however she struggles with rumors of infidelity and secret baby mamas surrounding both Shooter and BK. She also feuds with Shooter's friend Keely, leading to a violent altercation in which Sierra beats Keely with her purse. She and BK break up in season 8 after she reveals her own infidelity. Later, she shows an interest in Scrapp DeLeon, however ends up rekindling her relationship with BK. Sierra is promoted to main cast in season 9, which chronicles her legal issues, after allegedly assaulting Shooter's baby mama in 2017 while she was pregnant. During the season, she clashes with Shooter, who refuses to defend her in court, and Karlie, who fails to show up when she needs her most. Sierra also appears in one episode of Love & Hip Hop: New York in season 10, where she and Karlie attend Erica and Safaree's wedding.

=== Season 10 additions ===
- Kirk Frost (season 10, supporting cast member in seasons 1–9) is the husband and manager of Rasheeda. He is the CEO of D-Lo Entertainment, which he established in 1993. Frost has seven children, Chris with an unidentified woman, Cherry, Kirk Jr. and Kelsie with Kellie Harris, Ky and Karter with Rasheeda, and Kannon with Jasmine Washington, along with several grandchildren. Frost is initially portrayed as a supportive husband and manager, struggling to help Rasheeda break into the mainstream hip-hop scene and push her career to the next level. After Rasheeda discovers she is pregnant in season 2, his role on the show would take a darker turn, serving as the show's villain. In what would become of the show's most controversial storylines, Kirk accuses Rasheeda of infidelity and tells her to get an abortion before cheating on her on camera with two women. While they reconcile in season 3, Frost continues to make life difficult for Rasheeda, including clashing with her mother Shirleen, hiring a waitress he met at a bar as their babysitter, and in season 4, pitting her against his younger artist Ashley Nicole. He again throws his marriage into turmoil in season 6 when it is discovered that he has fathered a secret baby with Jasmine, a stripper. After a brief separation in season 7, Rasheeda takes Kirk back following the sudden death of his mother. After appearing as a supporting cast member in every season prior, Frost is promoted to main cast in season 10, where is credited in the opening with Rasheeda. In 2018, Kirk was reported to be making up to $300,000 per season.
- Yung Baby Tate (season 10) is a rapper and singer, known for her 2020 single "I Am". She is the daughter of singer Dionne Farris and producer David Ryan Harris. Season 10 chronicles her relationship struggles with Guapdad 4000. They later break up, and she explores her bisexuality with hair stylist Yada.
- Safaree Samuels (season 10, supporting cast member in season 9) is a rapper, record producer and entrepreneur, originally from Brooklyn, New York. He appeared previously on Love & Hip Hop: Hollywood and Love & Hip Hop: New York. He appears with his wife Erica Mena in a supporting role in season 9, before being promoted to the main cast in season 10, which chronicles their marital struggles after the birth of their daughter, Safire.
- Omeretta the Great (season 10) is a rapper. Season 10 chronicles her struggles with her mother, Akilah.
- Yandy Smith-Harris (season 10) is an entertainment manager, entrepreneur and social justice activist, originally from Harlem, New York. She first gained notoriety as the manager of rapper Jim Jones. She appeared previously on Love & Hip Hop: New York and VH1 Family Reunion: Love & Hip Hop Edition, as well as VH1 Couples Retreat with Rasheeda and Kirk. Season 10 chronicles her move to Atlanta, as well as her family struggles after the release of her husband Mendeecees from prison, amid tensions with her foster daughter Infinity and mother-in-law Judy.
- Mendeecees Harris (season 10) is Yandy's husband, also from Harlem, New York. He appeared with Yandy previously on Love & Hip Hop: New York, VH1 Family Reunion: Love & Hip Hop Edition and VH1 Couples Retreat. Season 10 chronicles his family struggles after his recent release from prison for drug trafficking charges.
- Kendra Robinson (season 10, supporting cast member in seasons 8–9) is Yung Joc's girlfriend. She is a criminal defense attorney and realtor, originally from Clinton, South Carolina. In season 8, it is revealed that she has been in a relationship with Yung Joc for the past few years. During the season, she comes into conflict with Karlie, who claims Joc pursued her while they were together. In the season finale, Joc proposes and she accepts.
- Adiz "Bambi" Benson (season 10, supporting cast member in seasons 3–9, guest star in season 2) is an urban model, video vixen, rapper and beauty entrepreneur, originally from Compton, California. In 2012, she appeared in a supporting role on Basketball Wives LA. Bambi first appears as a potential love interest for Benzino in season 2, however, most of their scenes together were cut and released on the show's website as bonus material. In season 3, she joins the supporting cast as Lil Scrappy's new girlfriend. She suffers a miscarriage early into the season, which Scrappy confides in his friend Erica Pinkett, igniting multiple altercations between the two women. She and Scrappy have broken up by season 5 and she begins dating rapper Chaz Gotti. However, by the season finale, Scrappy wins Bambi back with a proposal which she accepts. Bambi appears in three episodes in season 6 before calling off the engagement and quitting the show after her relationship with Scrappy falls apart. Bambi and Scrappy reunite offscreen, getting married in Las Vegas on September 8, 2017. They return for three episodes in season 7, where Bambi reveals she is pregnant with her first child. She gave birth to a son, Breland, while filming season 8.

== Supporting cast members ==
=== Original cast members ===
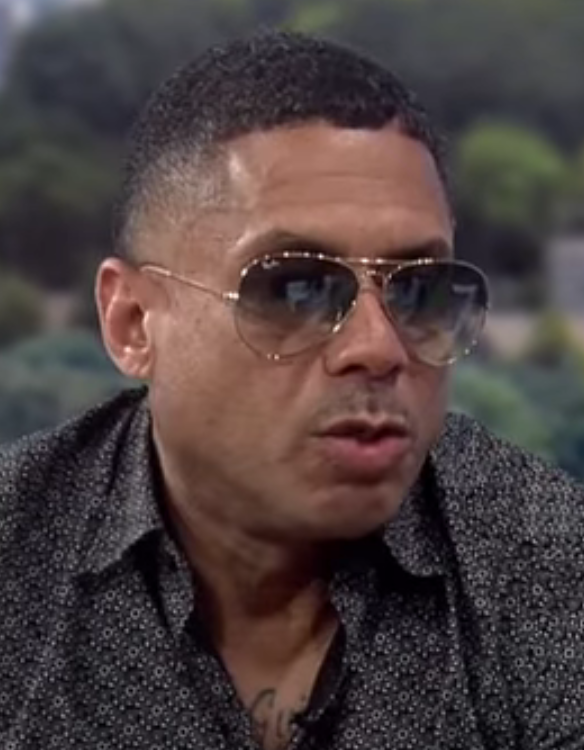
Benzino appears as a supporting cast member in the first three seasons of Love & Hip Hop: Atlanta.
- Ariane Davis (seasons 1–6) is Mimi's best friend and confidante, who supports her through her relationship dramas with Stevie J. She is a socialite and self-professed "celebrity mixologist", originally from Mississippi. She is a lesbian and active within Atlanta's LGBT community. Davis serves as a peacemaker whenever there is internal conflict within the group. Season 5 chronicles her attempts to kickstart a singing career, with help from D. Smith and K. Michelle. She is eventually phased out of the series, appearing in a minor role in season 6, where she comes into conflict with Melissa, who is revealed to have previously dated both her and Mimi.
- Momma Dee, real name Deborah Bryant (née Gaither), is Lil Scrappy's mother. She is a former pimp and drug dealer who ran a brothel for ten years under the name "Lady Dee". She is also the cousin of Yung Joc. Dee serves a similar role to Love & Hip Hop: New York's Mama Jones, appearing as the show's eccentric, overbearing mother meddling in her son's relationships with women. The first two seasons chronicle her strained relationship with Scrappy's baby mama Erica and her mother Mingnon, as she plays matchmaker between Scrappy and Shay. In season 3, while Scrappy is dating Bambi, she plays matchmaker between Scrappy and Erica Pinkett, igniting a violent feud between the two women. Dee's own love life is explored from season 4 onwards, when her ex-husband Ernest Bryant joins the cast. The two rekindle their romance and remarry in the season finale. Her marital struggles with Ernest serve as the show's comic relief in seasons 5–7. In season 8, she clashes with Bambi's mother Cee Cee, as they prepare for the birth of their grandchild. Since 2014, Dee has achieved relative success as a pop singer, releasing the viral singles "I Deserve" and "In That Order". Dee also appeared with Scrappy and Bambi in VH1 Family Reunion: Love & Hip Hop Edition.
- Shay Johnson (seasons 1–2, cameo appearance in season 3) is Lil Scrappy's friend "with benefits". She is an urban model and former video vixen who appeared in hip hop videos for Fabolous and Young Dro, however, she is best known as "Buckeey" on the VH1 reality shows Flavor of Love and Charm School. The first two seasons chronicles her romantic struggles with Scrappy, who she is in love with, however, he refuses to claim their relationship as anything more than casual sex. Shay filmed scenes for season 3, and can be briefly seen in a crowd scene at Benzino's bar opening. However, after a violent altercation during filming, in which she cracked a bottle over a woman's face in a nightclub brawl, she was removed from the cast and her scenes were left on the cutting room floor. In 2018, Shay joined the main cast of Love & Hip Hop: Miami, becoming one of the show's original eight cast members. She also appeared in the 2019 clip show specials Love & Hip Hop Awards: Most Certified and 40 Greatest Love & Hip Hop Moments: The Reboot.
- Benzino (seasons 1–3) is Stevie J's best friend and confidante. He is a hip hop media executive, record producer and rapper, originally from Boston, Massachusetts. He rose to notoriety as the founder of hip hop magazine The Source and through his much publicised feud with rapper Eminem. In the first season, Benzino begins dating Karlie Redd. They break up in the finale, after he proposes to her before immediately taking back the ring. In season 2, he comes into conflict with Joseline after releasing a diss track "Smashed Da Homie", in which he implies the two had sex. While filming season 3, Benzino was shot and wounded by his nephew at his mother's funeral. Later in the season, he proposes to his girlfriend Althea Heart, which she accepts. He and Althea have a major falling out with both Stevie J and Joseline, leading to a violent altercation between the four at the season's reunion special. The couple were then fired from the show, after Benzino allegedly threatened to kill one of the show's producers. In 2015, he and Althea appeared in We TV's Marriage Boot Camp: Reality Stars 4, and welcomed a son, Zino Antonio Scott Jr. They would also appear in TV One's The Next :15. Since 2016, the couple have made headlines in the tabloids for their violent break up and subsequent legal dramas.

=== Season 2 additions ===
- DJ Babey Drew (season 2), is the father of Traci's son, Little Drew. He is a DJ, originally from Queens, New York City. He came into the public eye while working as Chris Brown's tour DJ. Traci and Drew were in a relationship for four years before breaking up while she was pregnant with his child. Season 2 chronicles his co-parenting struggles with Traci, including jealously over each other's dating lives, and a failed attempt at opening a sneaker boutique together. Traci and Drew were not well-received by viewers, who dubbed them "boring" compared to the other cast members, and the two were fired from the show.

=== Season 3 additions ===
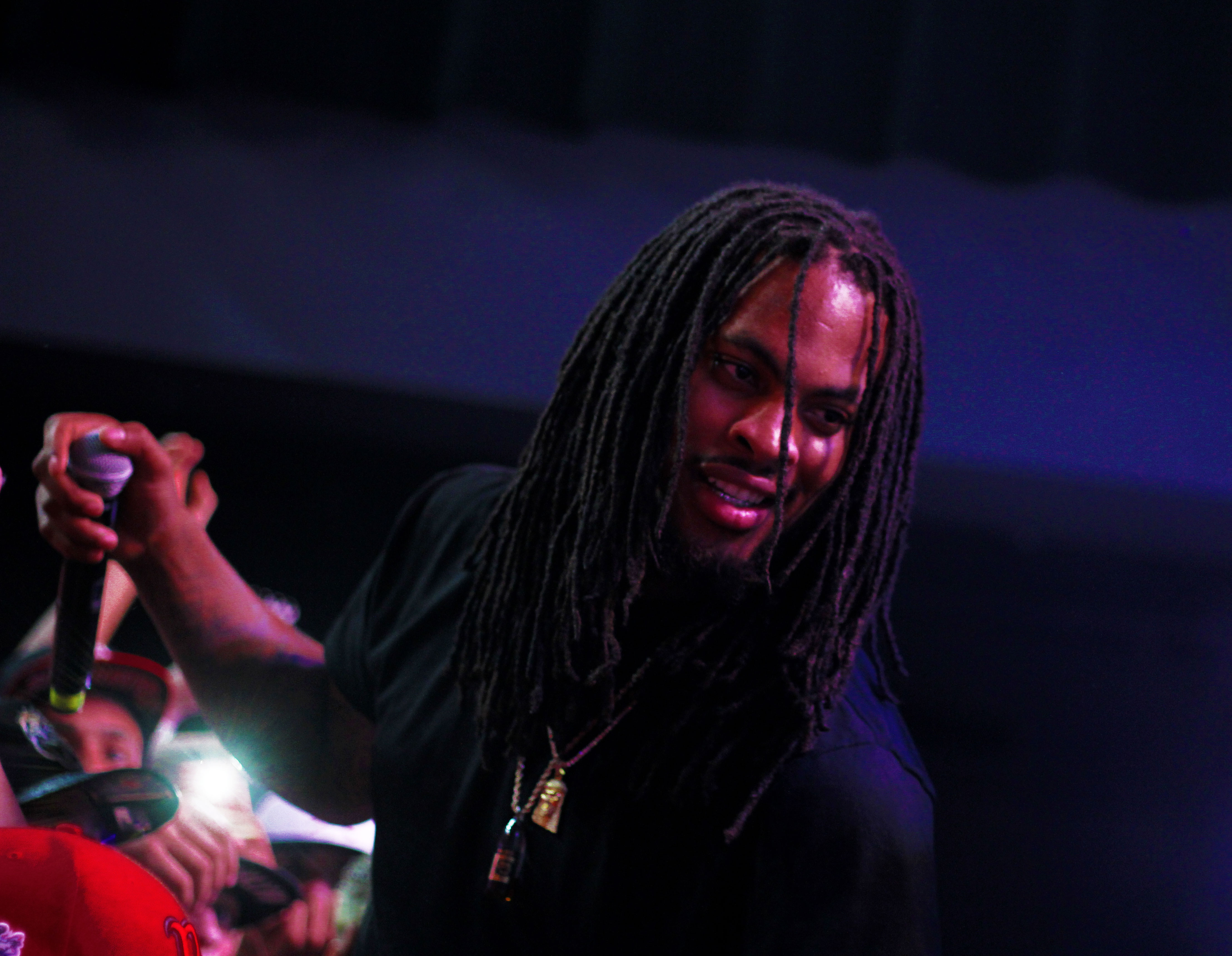
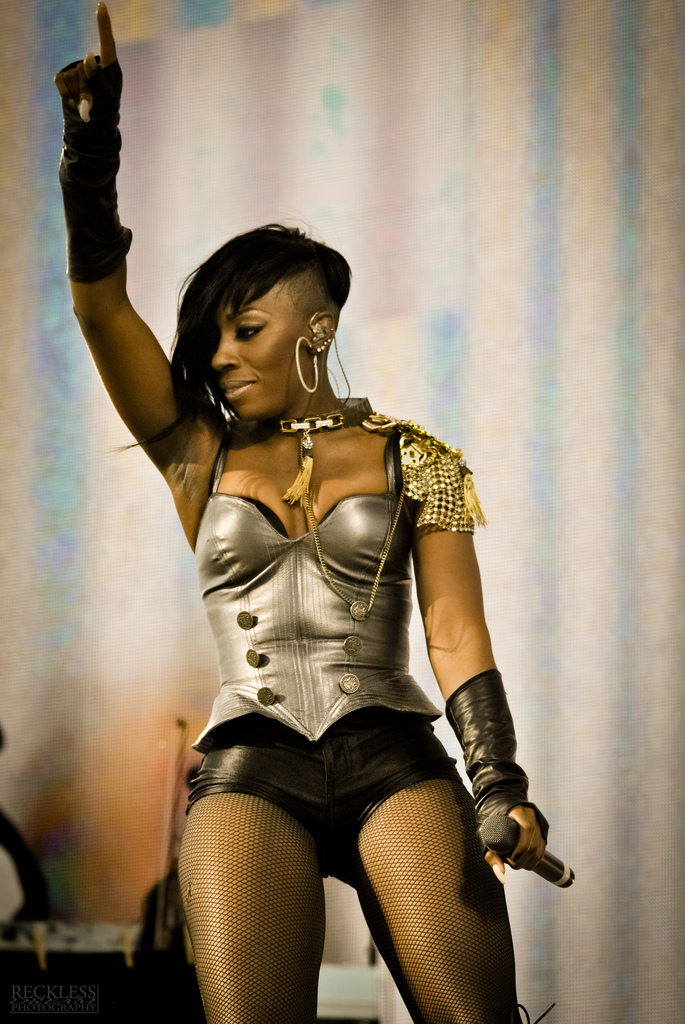
Waka Flocka Flame (top) and Kalenna Harper (below) join the supporting cast of Love & Hip Hop: Atlanta season 3.
- Waka Flocka Flame (seasons 3, 5–6) is a rapper. He rose to fame for his hit single "No Hands" and through his collaborations with Gucci Mane. He has been in a relationship with Tammy Rivera since 2011. Season 3 chronicles his relationship struggles with Tammy, including past infidelities and the loss of his brother, Kayo Redd. Later in the season, the couple elope. He returns for two episodes in season 5, where his much-publicized comments about transgender people creates tension between Tammy, D. Smith and Betty Idol. Later in the season, Tammy reveals that her and Waka have separated due to his infidelity, however they eventually rekindle their relationship in season 6.
- Nikko London (seasons 3–4, guest star in season 2) is Mimi's boyfriend. He is a rapper, record producer and personal trainer, originally from Brooklyn, New York. He first appears a guest star in season 2, having rekindled a relationship with Mimi, who he had known years prior. During the season, he clashes with K. Michelle, who accuses him of being gay with his roommate Johnny Crome, and Stevie J, who accuses him of gifting Mimi a fake Rolex. In season 3, he joins the supporting cast, which chronicles the leak of his sex tape with Mimi, and its subsequent release through Vivid Entertainment. While the tape is initially portrayed as being a stolen home video, the two later admit that the tape was staged. It is revealed towards the end of season that Nikko is still legally married. His wife, Margeaux, joins the cast in season 4. Nikko also appears with Margeaux and her girlfriend Merike as a "throuple" on We TV's Marriage Boot Camp: Reality Stars 6.
- Erica Pinkett (season 3, guest star in season 2), is Scrappy's friend and confidante. She is an actress, originally from Boston, Massachusetts. She appears briefly in season 2 as a flirtatious potential employee at Drew's sneaker store, much to the chagrin of Traci. In season 3, she joins the supporting cast, where her potential romantic interest in Scrappy ignites a feud with his girlfriend, Bambi.
- Kalenna Harper (seasons 3–4), is Rasheeda's friend and confidante. She is a singer-songwriter, originally from Philadelphia, Pennsylvania. She rose to fame as a member of the duo Dirty Money under the mentorship of P. Diddy. She is the wife of producer Tony Vick and the mother of his son, Meshach. Kalenna originally filmed scenes as a cast member in season 1, however, her scenes were cut and released on the show's website as bonus material. She joins the supporting cast in season 3, where she reveals her bisexuality and her relationship with singer Ashley T. Moore. Season 4 chronicles the birth of Noah, her second son with Tony, and her subsequent battle with postpartum depression. Later in the season, she clashes with Deb and Tammy, and has a falling out with Rasheeda, releasing a diss track about their feud.
- Dawn Heflin (seasons 3–5, guest star in seasons 2, 6–7) is Joseline's friend and confidante. She is booking agent, publicist and entertainment manager, originally from Miami, Florida. She has an extensive criminal history, having spent time in prison for drug trafficking and credit card fraud, once sharing a cell block with her future Love & Hip Hop co-star Karen King. She first appears as a guest star in season 2, helping Joseline book hosting gigs and performances. She joins the supporting cast in season 3, in which she exposes the real story behind Joseline and Stevie's alleged marriage, after having had a falling out with them. In season 4, she helps bring Jessica Dime to Atlanta, eventually stealing her as a client from Mimi. Dawn and Joseline rekindle their friendship in season 5 and Dawn supports her through the demise of her relationship with Stevie. Heflin returns in a guest role in season 6, where she helps Joseline with the birth of her daughter, and season 7, where she attends Jessica's baby shower. Heflin also makes guest appearances in seasons 1 and 3 of Love & Hip Hop: Miami, while working as Trick Daddy's manager and appearing as a friend to Joy, Shay and PreMadonna.
- Deb Antney (seasons 3–6, guest star in seasons 1–2) is the mother of Waka Flocka Flame. She is an entertainment manager and the founder and CEO of Mizay Entertainment. She rose to fame for breaking the careers of several high-profile artists, such as Gucci Mane, French Montana and Nicki Minaj. She previously appeared in a minor supporting role in the spin-off show Chrissy & Mr. Jones. Deb first appears as a guest star in the first two seasons, acting as a mentor to Rasheeda and the other women. She joins the supporting cast in season 3, which chronicles the death of her son, Kayo Redd, which inspires her advocacy for suicide prevention and anti-bullying.
- Althea Heart (season 3) is Benzino's girlfriend. She is a singer. During season 3, it is revealed that she had previously dated Stevie J and Nikko. Later, Benzino proposes and she accepts. The couple have a major falling out with Stevie and Joseline, leading to a violent altercation at the season's reunion special. Althea and Benzino were fired from the show soon after, allegedly when Benzino threatened a producer of the show.
- Tony Vick (season 3–4) is Kalenna's husband. He is a record producer and club promoter. He has nine kids to seven baby mothers, along with at least three grandchildren.

=== Season 4 additions ===
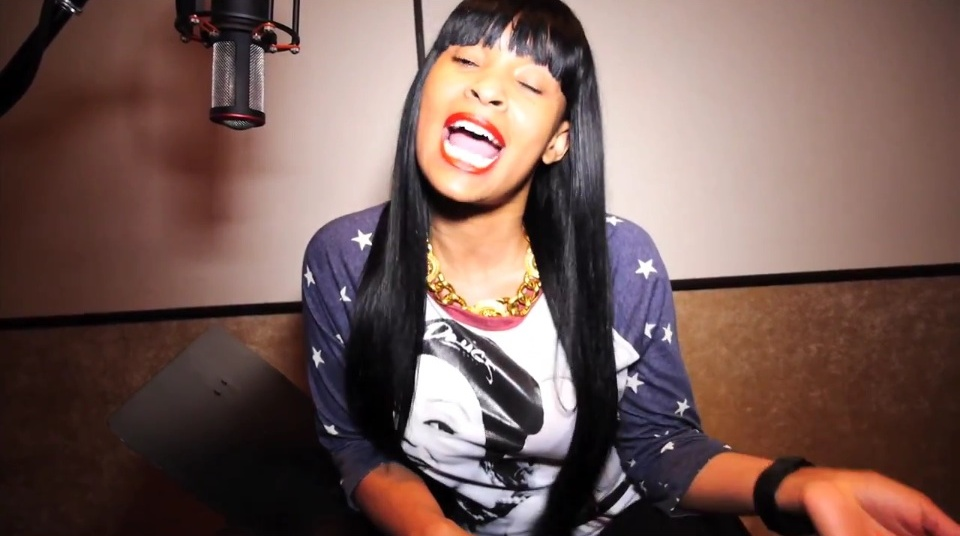
Tiffany Foxx joins the supporting cast in season 4.
- Margeaux Simms (season 4) is Nikko's wife. She is a singer-songwriter and visual artist, originally from Toronto, Ontario. She married Nikko in 2007, and while they have since separated, they are still legally married. This revelation breaks up Mimi and Nikko in season 3. In season 4, Margeaux joins the supporting cast, which chronicles her move to Atlanta to kickstart her career, as well as to expose Mimi for fabricating the sex tape "leak" with her husband. She also ends up clashing with Stevie J and Joseline. Later in the season, she reveals her bisexuality and begins dating model Merike Palmiste. Margeaux was fired early into production on season 5. She would instead appear with Nikko and Merike as a "throuple" on We TV's Marriage Boot Camp: Reality Stars 6.
- Ashley Nicole (season 4) is a singer-songwriter under Kirk's management. During season 4, she clashes with Rasheeda, who suspects her of sleeping with her husband. It is later revealed that she is a lesbian with a girlfriend of two years. Nicole later admitted in interviews that her storyline was fabricated.
- Khadiyah Lewis (season 4, guest star in season 3) is Yung Joc's real estate agent and "assistant". She first appears as a guest star during season 3, where is soon revealed that she is having sex with Joc behind Karlie's back, breaking up their relationship. In season 4, she joins the supporting cast, having now become Joc's official girlfriend. During the season, she has a rivalry with his four baby mothers, specifically Sina. Joc reveals the two have broken up in season 5. Tragically, on May 30, 2026, Khadiyah passed away under unknown circumstances.
- Sina Bina (seasons 4, 8, guest star in season 6) is the mother of Yung Joc's twin daughters, Eden and Allon, originally from Compton, California. In season 4, she joins the supporting cast as Khadiyah's main rival for Joc's affections. She returns in seasons 6 and 8, once again involving herself in Joc's dating life. Sina also appears in the special Love & Hip Hop Atlanta: Dirty Little Secrets 2, where it is implied that her and Karlie enjoyed a casual fling.
- Tiffany Foxx (season 4, guest star in season 9) is a rapper under Mimi's management, originally from St. Louis, Missouri. In season 4, she is briefly managed by Mimi, igniting a rivalry with Jessica Dime.
- Ernest Bryant (seasons 4–6, guest star in seasons 7, 9) is Momma Dee's ex-husband. She accidentally sent him away to prison for seven years when he was caught with drugs after she called the cops on him for stealing money from Scrappy. In season 4, Ernest joins the supporting cast after being released from prison. He and Momma Dee rekindle their romance and remarry in the season finale.
- PreMadonna (season 4) is a fashion designer, entrepreneur and rapper, originally from Miami, Florida. She is the owner of the Waist Gang Society waist trainers, popularised by Kim Kardashian and Blac Chyna. She appears in a minor supporting role for two episodes of season 4. In 2020, she joined the cast of Love & Hip Hop: Miami.

=== Season 5 additions ===
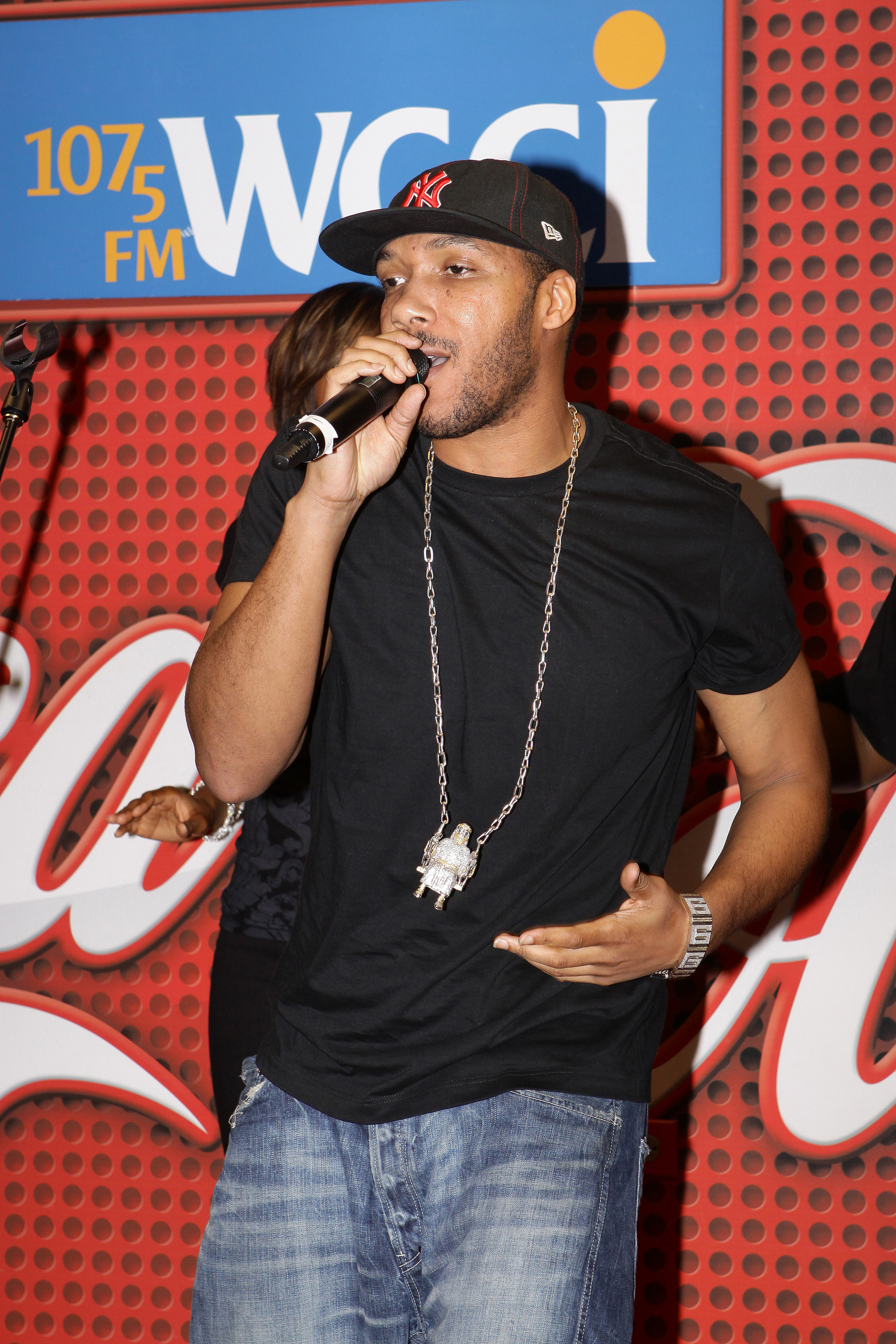
Lyfe Jennings joins the supporting cast in season 5.
- Karen King (seasons 5–9), also known as KK, is the mother and manager of rappers Scrapp DeLeon and Sas. She is a longtime family friend of Stevie J and her sons call him "uncle". In 2009, her nephew Dolla was shot and killed. In 2012, she and her sons were accused of the kidnapping, assault and attempted murder of her ex-husband. She went on the run and was featured in an episode of America's Most Wanted. KK was later cleared of all charges. While in jail, she shared a cell block with Dawn. Season 5 chronicles her struggles to keep her family together, amid tensions with Scrapp's baby mama Tiarra. During filming, she was arrested for financial identity fraud, theft and first degree forgery, however she was again cleared on all charges. In season 6, she attempts to help Tommie overcome her alcoholism and repair her relationship with her mother. This eventually backfires and the two have a falling out. Seasons 7 and 8 chronicle Karen's efforts to get Scrapp out of jail, and his subsequent release and reunion with his family.
- Tiarra Becca (seasons 5, 7–8) is the mother of Scrapp DeLeon's son King, originally from Dayton, Ohio. She has four other children to different fathers. She works a day job at a financial firm, while moonlighting as a nightclub waitress and urban model. Season 5 chronicles her co-parenting struggles with Scrapp, amid feuds with his mother KK and his girlfriend Tommie. Later in the season, she begins dating J-Nicks, igniting a feud with his girlfriend Amber Priddy. During the season's reunion, she reveals she is pregnant with her fifth child and has recently married another man. She returns in season 7, now divorced and having terminated the pregnancy. She appears mainly as Jasmine's friend and confidante, arranging things so that she comes face to face with Rasheeda. Upon Scrapp's release from prison in season 8, Tiarra attempts to rekindle their relationship, however he rejects her. Tiarra was extremely critical of this storyline and her portrayal while filming, and she was eventually phased out of the show, not attending the season's reunion. In the season finale, Scrapp reveals he now has custody of their son.
- Chris Gould (season 5) is introduced as Mimi's significant other. While Mimi introduces Chris repeatedly as her girlfriend and the other cast members refer to him as "she", Chris identifies as genderqueer (specifically a "touch-me-not") and prefers male pronouns. He joins the supporting cast in season 5, however breaks up with Mimi halfway through the season, unable to deal with the drama in her life. Chris returns later in the season, revealing his desire to fully transition to male and pursue top surgery.
- D. Smith (season 5) is a Grammy Award-winning record producer, recording artist and fashion model. She is a trans woman. She joins the supporting cast in season 5, where she clashes with Tammy over Waka Flocka Flame's comments about transgender people and later ignites feuds with Deb, Bambi and Scrappy. She quit the show shortly before the reunion taping, unhappy with her portrayal on the show.
- Betty Idol (season 5) is D. Smith's best friend and confidante. She is a singer of Colombian and African American ethnicity, originally from Houston, Texas, mostly known for singing the hook on Rick Ross' single "Thug Cry". In season 5, she pursues a romance with Scrappy and clashes with Bambi and Tammy.
- Lyfe Jennings (season 5, guest star in season 4) is Karlie's boyfriend. He is an R&B/soul, singer and songwriter, originally from Toledo, Ohio. Season 5 chronicles the demise of his relationship with Karlie, allegedly due to her infidelity with Scrapp. Karlie later discovers that he got another woman pregnant while they were together, and married a third woman behind her back.
- Kelsie Frost (seasons 5, 7–8, 10, guest star in seasons 4, 9, cameo in season 1) is Kirk's daughter. She is an aspiring rapper, who works as Rasheeda's employee at her boutique store. Kelsie first appears in a cameo at Rasheeda and Kirk's vow renewal in season 1, before joining the supporting cast in season 5, which chronicles her struggles to be taken seriously as an artist by her father and stepmother. She returns in a guest role in season 6, which chronicled the family's struggles after Jasmine's revelation, and in a minor supporting role in seasons 7, 8 and 10, where she acts as a peacemaker between Jasmine and Kirk as they struggle to co-parent.
- Shirleen Harvell (seasons 5–7, 10, guest star in seasons 2–4, 8–9, cameo in season 1) is Rasheeda's mother. She first appears in a cameo at Rasheeda and Kirk's vow renewal in season 1, and appears as a guest star in seasons 2–4. She has a strained relationship with her son-in-law Kirk, at one point even running over his motorcycle with her car after finding out he cheated on Rasheeda. She joins the supporting cast in season 5, where she starts working at Rasheeda's boutique store and clashes with Momma Dee.
- Sas (season 5, guest star in seasons 7–8) is Scrapp's younger brother and KK's son. He is a rapper and member of the rap group Da Razkalz Cru. In 2012, he was accused of the kidnapping, assault and attempted murder of his father. He, along with his mother and brother, were later cleared of all charges. After filming season 5, he survived a gunshot to the back of the head.
- J-Nicks (season 5), also known as Stuey Rock, is a DJ and radio personality, originally from St. Louis, Missouri. He rose to fame as a host of BET's Rap City. He works as a weekday radio DJ for Hot 107.9. During season 5, he pursues a romance with Tiarra, despite being in a relationship with Amber.
- Amber Priddy (season 5, guest star in season 7) is a stripper and urban model, originally from Charlotte, North Carolina. In season 5, she pursues a romance with Yung Joc behind J-Nicks' back. She returns in a guest role in season 7, where she reveals that she has been having a sexual relationship with BK behind Sierra's back.

=== Season 6 additions ===
- Melissa Scott (seasons 6–7) is a long time friend of both Mimi and Joseline, attempting to act as a peacemaker between the two. She is a promoter, LGBT events manager and bar owner. In season 6, it is revealed later that she had a fling with Mimi the summer before, and had a "friends-with-benefits" relationship with Ariane several years earlier. After having a heated confrontation with Mimi and Mimi's girlfriend Ty in season 7, Melissa is phased out of the show and does not attend the season's reunion special.
- Jasmine Washington (seasons 6–8) is Kirk's mistress and mother of his son, Kannon. She is a former stripper, originally from White Plains, New York. In season 6, she reveals their affair, throwing Kirk and Rasheeda's marriage into turmoil. During this time, she is living in a polyamorous relationship with Rod and Keanna. In season 7, she attempts to reach out to Rasheeda's family to get closure, later finally coming face to face with Rasheeda. She returns in two episodes in season 8, disappearing from the show after Kirk criticises her parenting style.
- Rod Bullock (season 6) is Jasmine and Keanna's boyfriend. He is a music manager, originally from Indianapolis, Indiana. He shares a past with Mimi, having dated her prior to her relationship with Stevie. It ended badly, with Mimi claiming he is a scammer and con artist. In season 6, he has recently been released from prison for money laundering.
- Keanna Arnold (season 6) is Rod and Jasmine's girlfriend. She is a former stripper. In season 6, she reveals to have also slept with Kirk around the same time as Jasmine.
- Moriah Lee (season 6) is Sierra's marketing assistant, and an aspiring business owner. In season 6, it is revealed that she has been having an affair with Sierra's husband, Shooter.
- Lovely Mimi (season 6) is a Vietnamese nail artist and social media personality, originally from the DMV, where she owns a salon. She has two children to her husband Remy Skinner. In season 6, she works briefly at Sierra's salon, before the two have a violent falling out. She later forms a friendship with Tommie and the other girls.
- Tresure P. (season 6) is an aspiring DJ and radio personality, originally from Houston, Texas. She is a former stripper. In season 6, she sparks a violent rivalry with Tommie after revealing she is in a relationship with a married man. She also has a friendship with Joc's baby mama Sina, and works as an intern at Joc's radio station. Later, she crashes the cast's Jamaican trip, and gets her wig snatched by Jessica Dime.
- Shooter Gates (seasons 6–7, 9) is Sierra's husband and the father of her two children. In season 6, he is revealed to be secretly dating and financially supporting Moriah behind his wife's back. In season 7, he has separated from Sierra, and dealing with the sudden death of his son, Rodricous Jr., who was murdered in a shooting. He returns in season 9, which chronicles his love triangle with Ki'yomi and Cheyenne.
- Gunplay (season 6) is a rapper, originally from Miami, Florida. He appears in a supporting role in one episode of season 6, where he convinces his friend Scrappy to move to Miami with him. His appearance served as a teaser for the then-upcoming spin-off Love & Hip Hop: Miami, which would premiere months later and feature him as a main cast member.
- Estelita Quintero (seasons 6–7) is an urban model and singer under Stevie J's management, originally from Colón, Panama. She endured a rough childhood as the youngest daughter of twenty brothers and sisters. She was sexually molested by her father from five years old, he died when she was nine. She fled to America after she was gang raped by five men. By the age of fourteen, she was working as a stripper in Miami. She later lost her mother to cancer, which lead her to attempt suicide twice. She is also a domestic violence survivor, having survived an abusive relationship for many years prior to the show. In season 6, she joins Stevie's roster of artists and clashes with Karlie. In season 7, she reunited with former friend Erica Mena and struggles to gain control of her career when her relationship with Stevie turns sexual. She also made a cameo appearance in an episode of Love & Hip Hop: Hollywood as a runway model for Princess Love's clothing line in a fashion show.
- Savannah Jordan (seasons 6–7, cameo appearance in season 9) is Stevie J's daughter. She previously appeared as a supporting cast member on the spin-offs Stevie J & Joseline: Go Hollywood and Leave It to Stevie. Savannah appears in a minor supporting role in season 6, where her strained relationship with Joseline causes problems between her and Stevie. In season 7, she is devastated to learn that her father may have to serve jail time for not paying child support. Later, she gets into a brawl with Erica Mena while defending her father.
- Samantha Lee (seasons 6–7) is Tommie's mother. She has at least four other children, including Duby, Yani, Rayjasha and Versace, who all have appeared on the show. Like her daughter, she has a long criminal history and struggled with substance abuse. Samantha appears in a minor supporting role in season 6, where she tries to salvage her relationship with her daughter. In season 7, she attempts to act as a peacemaker between Tommie and her sister Versace.

=== Season 7 additions ===
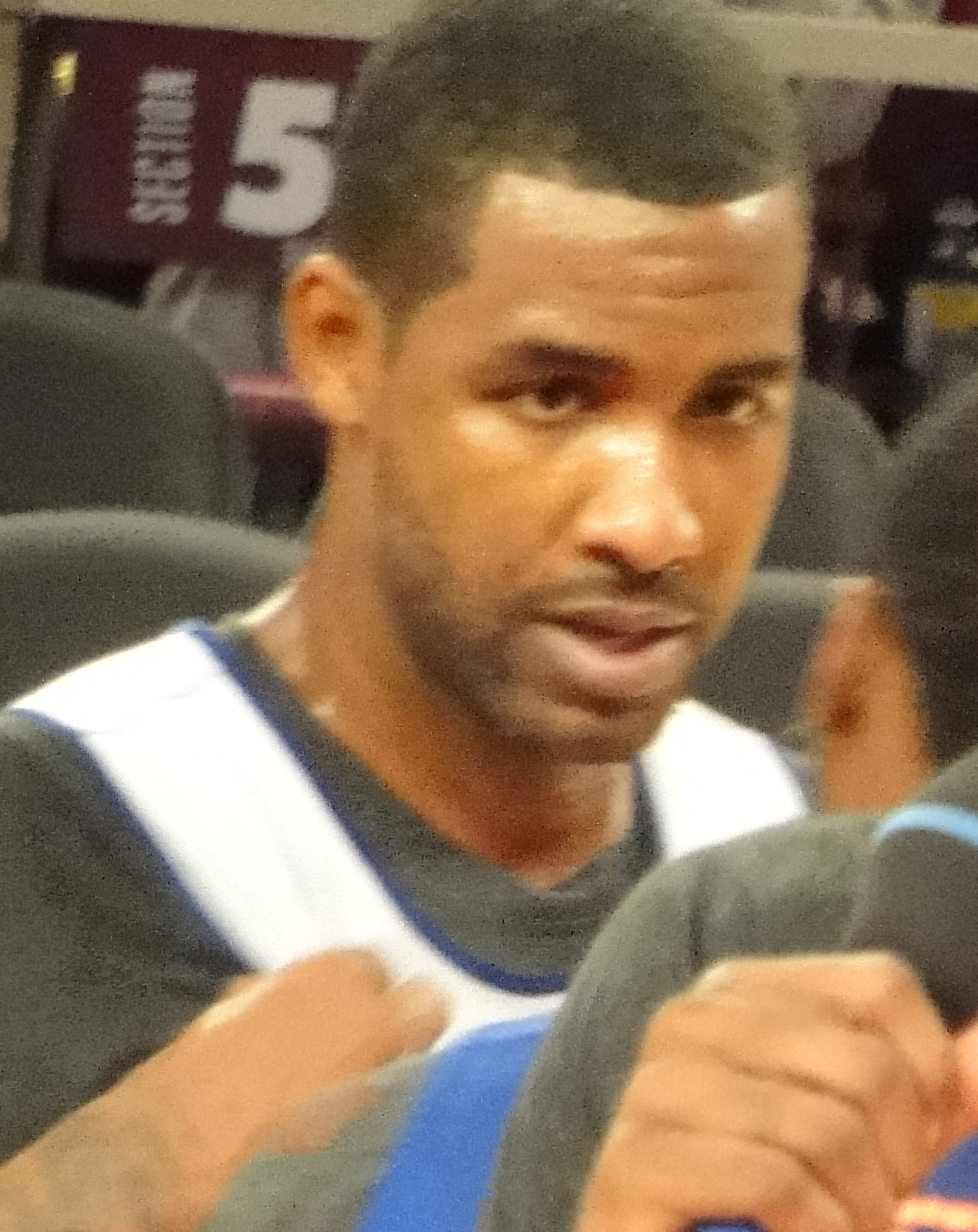
Basketball player Shawne Williams joins the supporting cast in season 7.
- BK Brasco (seasons 7–10) is Sierra's boyfriend. He is a rapper, originally from Brownsville, Brooklyn. He has two children from previous relationships. During season 7, he is accused of cheating on her with Joy and Amber Priddy, as well as lying about how many children he has. He and Sierra break up during season 8, after she admits she cheated on him. The couple later reconcile on and off.
- Tokyo Vanity (seasons 7–9) is a rapper, originally from New Orleans, Louisiana. She rose to fame for her 2015 hit "That's My Best Friend", which went viral on Instagram and Vine. She has garnered media attention for her body positivity and virginity. Season 7 chronicles her relationship struggles with her boyfriend Tabius. The two break up during the season and he begins dating Spice. When Spice makes derogatory comments about Tokyo's weight, the two get into a violent altercation, however they later reconcile and become friends. In season 8, her friendship with Sierra grows strained when Sierra becomes concerned with her health and eating habits.
- Tabius Tate (season 7) is Tokyo's boyfriend. He is a rapper, originally from Montgomery, Alabama. During season 7, it is revealed that he dated Karlie years prior. He and Tokyo break up during the season and he briefly dates Spice, igniting a rivalry between the two women.
- Keely Hill (season 7) is Shooter's long time friend and confidante. She is a music industry executive and marketing representative, originally from Detroit, Michigan. She has a son, Xavier J. McKnight, with rapper Bleu DaVinci, who also appears on the show. She has a severe dislike for Sierra, and the two women get into several altercations. She also later sparks feuds with Karlie, Tokyo and Just Brittany. During the season, she is dating K. Botchey, however the two break up over Keely's refusal to tell him who her baby daddy is.
- Just Brittany (season 7) is a recording artist and singer under Stevie J's management, originally from Houston, Texas. She was part of the original cast of Love & Hip Hop: Houston, before the show was shelved in 2016. In season 7, she sparks her violent feud with Estelita and Erica Mena when they compete to become the "First Lady" of Danger Zone, Stevie's label. She also admits to having had a casual fling with Stevie.
- Shawne Williams (season 7, guest star in season 6) is Jessica's long time boyfriend and childhood sweetheart. He is a professional basketball player, originally from Memphis, Tennessee. On the cast's trip to Jamaica in season 6, he proposes and she accepts. Season 7 chronicles the birth of his first child with Jessica.
- K. Botchey (season 7) is Keely's boyfriend. He is a promoter and events manager. He and Keely break up during the season after it is revealed that Botchey is still dealing with his ex-girlfriend Crystal.
- Sean Garrett (season 7) is Karlie's boyfriend. He a Grammy Award-winning record producer and recording artist. He and Karlie break up during the season due to her "messiness". Later, he gets into a violent altercation with Stevie J.
- Rich Dollaz (seasons 7, 10), born Richard Trowers, is Erica Mena's ex-boyfriend. He is an entertainment manager who first gained notoriety as the manager of Olivia. His tumultuous, on-and-off again relationship with Erica was chronicled in several seasons of Love & Hip Hop: New York. He also appeared as a supporting cast member on Love & Hip Hop: Hollywood. Dollaz appears in a minor supporting role in the last two episodes of season 7, as part of a scheme by Stevie to get revenge on Erica Mena.

=== Season 8 additions ===
- Pooh Hicks (season 8), born Gynel Ladawn Campbell, is an estranged former friend of Karlie's. She is a socialite and wife of music producer Hiriam Hicks, originally from Detroit, Michigan. The two met while she was working as a stripper. She is openly bisexual and her and her husband have an open marriage. During season 8, Pooh reveals that she had Karlie had a threesome with her husband, igniting a violent feud between the two.
- Che Mack (season 8, guest star in seasons 1–2), is a rapper and DJ, originally from Philadelphia, Pennsylvania. Che first appears as a guest star in season 1, as an aspiring artist under Stevie J's management, who later ignites a violent rivalry with Joseline in season 2. In January 2017, Che gave birth to a daughter, Ginger Specelle Mosley, with the rapper Made Man. She returns as a supporting cast member in season 8, which chronicles their relationship struggles.
- Moniece Slaughter (season 8), is Scrapp's girlfriend. She is a singer-songwriter, originally from Los Angeles, California. She is as a main cast member on Love & Hip Hop: Hollywood and is one of the show's original eight cast members. She also previously appeared in a minor supporting role on Love & Hip Hop: New York. In season 8, it is revealed that she has been Scrapp DeLeon's pen pal while he was in prison. Upon his release, a romance blossoms between the two. They break up midway through the season, after he is seen canoodling with his ex-girlfriend Tommie.
- Shekinah Anderson (seasons 8–10), also known as Shekinah Jo or Shekinah Jones, is a hair stylist and entrepreneur. She rose to fame as the best friend of Tiny on the VH1 reality shows T.I. & Tiny: The Family Hustle and Tiny & Shekinah's Weave Trip. Shekinah joins the supporting cast in season 8, as a longtime friend of Rasheeda, Karlie, Tokyo Vanity, Sierra and Che. Later, she sparks a feud with Akbar, after it is revealed the two have been dealing with the same man.
- Akbar V (seasons 8–9), born Valerie Raven, is a rapper. She endured a rough childhood growing up in Cleveland Ave, including experiencing drug addiction, sexual abuse, the death of her mother and having survived a gunshot wound to the head. Her cousin is Kandi Burruss. She has five children from previous relationships, including Dorribion who appears on the show. Season 8 chronicles her struggles to escape the hood and kick-start her career. During the season, she ignites violent feuds with Tokyo Vanity, Spice, Sierra and Shekinah. In season 9, she gets into a brawl with LightSkinKeisha.
- Cee Cee (seasons 8–9, guest star in season 5), also credited as Clemmie Shaw, is Bambi's mother, originally from Compton, California. Season 8 chronicles her strained relationship with Momma Dee as their prepare for the birth of their grandchild.
- Sharonda Official (seasons 8, guest star in season 7, 9) is a hair stylist and entrepreneur. She co-owns Salon Eshelon with Yung Joc, and is responsible for many of his hairstyles which have gone viral online. In season 8, she sparks a feud with Kendra after rumors swirl that Joc has been sexually involved with her and other stylists at the salon.

=== Season 9 additions ===
- Alexis Skyy (season 9, guest star in season 6, cameo in season 5) is an urban model and socialite. She rose to fame for her relationship with Fetty Wap. She previously appeared on Love & Hip Hop: Hollywood and Love & Hip Hop: New York. She first appeared on the show in a cameo as a model in Tammy's fashion show in season 5, then as Jessica Dime's date in an episode in season 6. In season 9, she joins the supporting cast, where she opens up about being sex trafficked. It was also revealed that she was in a relationship with Karlie's then husband Arkansas Mo igniting a feud between the two.
- LightSkinKeisha (season 9) is a rapper and social media personality. Season 9 chronicles her relationship with rapper Coca Vango, as well as her feuds with Bambi and Akbar V.
- Ki'yomi Leslie (season 9) is Shooter's girlfriend. She is aspiring rapper, model and entrepreneur who came into the public eye after dating Bow Wow. During the season, she fights with Cheyenne over Shooter.
- Cheyenne Robinson (season 9, guest star in season 8) is Scrapp's long lost half sister. She is his only relative without a criminal record, which helps get Scrapp out of jail. During season 9, it is revealed that she had been dating Shooter, who unbeknownst to her, is already in a relationship with Ki'yomi.

=== Season 10 additions ===
- Ky Frost (season 10, guest star in seasons 6–7, 9) is Kirk and Rasheeda's son.
- Infinity Gilyard (season 10) is Yandy's foster daughter. She appeared previously on Love & Hip Hop: New York.
- Renni Rucci (season 10) is a rapper, originally from South Carolina. She came into the public eye through her relationship with rapper Foogiano, who was sentenced to five years in prison in 2021.
- Jasmine Ellis (season 10, guest star in season 8) is Karlie's daughter. She also appeared in the spin-off VH1 Family Reunion: Love & Hip Hop Edition.
- Judy Harris (season 10) is Mendeecees' mother. She appeared previously on Love & Hip Hop: New York and VH1 Family Reunion: Love & Hip Hop Edition.
- Eric Whitehead (season 10) is Sierra's new boyfriend, fiancee & ex-husband. He is the owner of a luxury car business, originally from Brooklyn, New York.
- Justin Budd (season 10), also credited as Justin "JBudd", is Spice's new boyfriend. He is a cinematographer and camera operator, who also worked behind-the-scenes as a director of photography on seasons 8 and 9 of the show.
- Amoni Robinson (season 10) is Joc's son. He also appeared in the spin-off VH1 Family Reunion: Love & Hip Hop Edition.
- Meda Montana (season 10) is Spice's friend, who admits to having an affair with Joc.
- Lil Mendeecees (season 10) is Mendeecees' son with his ex-girlfriend Samantha. He appeared previously on Love & Hip Hop: New York.

== Guest stars ==
Several members of the cast's inner circle appear as recurring guest stars. They include:

Introduced in season 1

- Mingnon Dixon, Erica's mother, a recovering crack cocaine addict and Momma Dee's rival
- Dr. Jeff, therapist who works with Mimi, Joseline, Stevie and Karlie
- Fly Dantoni, rapper and record producer, Joseline's friend and occasional enemy
- Eva Jordan, daughter of Mimi and Stevie, cast member on the spin-off Leave It to Stevie
- Emani Richardson, daughter of Scrappy and Erica

Introduced in season 2

- Johnny Crome, rapper, Nikko's roommate, accused of being gay by K. Michelle
- DaShaun Johnson, personal trainer, Traci's love interest
- Bobby V, singer, friend to Scrappy, Kirk and Benzino
- Mary Jane, Kirk's jacuzzi fling
- Moses Jordan, Stevie J's father

Introduced in season 3

- O'Shea Jackson, model, Erica's love interest
- Jasmine Swann, waitress, Kirk's potential babysitter
- Ashley T. Moore, bisexual singer, Kalenna's ex-girlfriend

Introduced in season 4

- Faith Evans, singer, songwriter, Stevie's friend and confidante, cast member on the spin-off Leave It to Stevie, later Stevie's wife
- Jazze Pha, record producer, interested in working with Jessica Dime, Tiffany Foxx and Erica Mena
- Jasmine Brown, Scrappy's sister, disapproves of Momma Dee's relationship with Ernest
- Bessie Bryant, Ernest's mother
- DJ Toni K, Ariane's girlfriend

Introduced in season 5

- Taylor Hall, urban model, Scrappy's assistant, Yung Joc's love interest
- Shod Santiago, gay stylist, Tammy's friend
- Chaz Gotti, rapper, Waka's friend, Bambi's love interest
- Lil' Fizz, rapper, cast member on Love & Hip Hop: Hollywood
- Nikki Mudarris, socialite, Joseline's friend-with-benefits, cast member on Love & Hip Hop: Hollywood
- Jonathan Fernandez, makeup artist, cast member on K. Michelle: My Life and Love & Hip Hop: New York
- Deelishis, urban model, Stevie's love interest
- Young Dro, rapper, Joseline's love interest

Introduced in season 6

- Sade Jordan, Stevie's daughter, cast member on the spin-offs Stevie J & Joseline: Go Hollywood and Leave It to Stevie
- Dorian Jordan, Stevie's son, cast member on the spin-off Leave It to Stevie
- Kermit Silva, Joseline's brother
- Ceaser Emmanuel, tattoo artist, Karlie's boyfriend, cast member on Black Ink Crew
- Logan Bullard, Jasmine's ex-boyfriend, suspected father of her child
- Stevie Jordan Jr., Stevie's son, cast member on the spin-offs Stevie J & Joseline: Go Hollywood and Leave It to Stevie

Introduced in season 7

- Ty Young, basketball player, Mimi's girlfriend
- Versace, Tommie's estranged sister
- Duby, Yani and Rayjasha, Tommie's siblings
- Albee Yours, Erica Mena's friend
- Bleu DaVinci, rapper, Keely's baby daddy

Introduced in season 8

- Arkansas Mo, trucking mogul, Karlie's fiancé
- Made Man, rapper, Che Mack's baby daddy
- Hiriam Hicks, music mogul, Pooh's husband, allegedly had a threesome with her and Karlie

The show also features minor appearances from notable figures within the hip hop industry and Atlanta's social scene, including J. Que, Bryan-Michael Cox, Kenny Burns, Stevie Baggs, Vincent Herbert, Roscoe Dash, Beenie Man, Steven Hirsch, Jeremih, DJ Vlad, Snoop Dogg, Jermaine Dupri, T-Pain, Katt Williams, CeeLo Green, Tony Rock, Russell Simmons, Jasmine Burke, Kandi Burruss, Dr. Jackie Walters, Michael Blackson, Cocoa Brown and Sam Phillips, Pastor Jamal Bryant, Machel Montano and Destra Garcia.

Executive producer Mona Scott-Young hosted the first two seasons' reunions, comedian Sommore hosted the third season reunion. The reunion specials from seasons 4–8 are hosted by Nina Parker. Claudia Jordan hosted the tenth season reunion.
