= Love & Hip Hop: Atlanta season 2 =

Love & Hip Hop: Atlanta
- Season 2
- DVD cover
- Starring: Joseline Hernandez; Erica Dixon; Rasheeda; K. Michelle; Traci Steele; Karlie Redd; Mimi Faust
- No. of episodes: 17

Release
- Original network: VH1
- Original release: April 22 – August 12, 2013

Season chronology
- ← Previous; Season 1 Next → Season 3

The second season of the reality television series Love & Hip Hop: Atlanta aired on VH1 from April 22, 2013 until August 12, 2013. The season was primarily filmed in Atlanta, Georgia. It was executive produced by Mona Scott-Young for Monami Entertainment, Toby Barraud and Stefan Springman for NFGTV, and Shelly Tatro, Brad Abramson, Danielle Gelfand and Jeff Olde for VH1. Carlos King served as co-executive producer.

The series chronicles the lives of several women and men in the Atlanta area, involved in hip hop music. It consists of 17 episodes, including a two-part reunion special hosted by Mona Scott Young.

== Production ==
On April 1, 2013, VH1 announced that Love & Hip Hop: Atlanta would be returning for a second season on April 22, 2013. All main cast members from the previous season returned. Radio personality Traci Steele was added to the main cast, while her former boyfriend DJ Babey Drew joined the supporting cast.

The season was released on DVD in region 1 on September 11, 2014.

== Synopsis ==
Joseline strives to reclaim her independence from Stevie. Erica's engagement to Scrappy hits the skids, as her tensions with Momma Dee explode. K. Michelle's beef with the other ladies threatens to derail her career. Rasheeda discovers she is pregnant and the news reveals a whole new side to Kirk. Mimi has a new man. Traci and her baby daddy Drew struggle to find common ground.

=== Reception ===
The show's ratings continued to grow, with an average of 3.27 million viewers per episode.

== Cast ==
=== Starring ===
- Joseline Hernandez (17 episodes)
- Erica Dixon (15 episodes)
- Rasheeda (14 episodes)
- K. Michelle (16 episodes)
- Traci Steele (14 episodes)
- Karlie Redd (11 episodes)
- Mimi Faust (17 episodes)

=== Also starring ===
- Stevie J (17 episodes)
- Lil Scrappy (16 episodes)
- Shay Johnson (9 episodes)
- Momma Dee (13 episodes)
- Benzino (12 episodes)
- Ariane Davis (14 episodes)
- DJ Babey Drew (11 episodes)
- Kirk Frost (15 episodes)

Erica's mother Mingnon Dixon, Dawn Heflin, Nikko London, Stevie J's artist Che Mack, Shirleen Harvell and Traci's boyfriend DaShaun Johnson appear as guest stars in several episodes. The show features minor appearances from notable figures within the hip hop industry and Atlanta's social scene, including Stevie J and Mimi's daughter Eva Jordan, Erica Pinkett, Nikko's friend Johnny Crome, Deb Antney, Bobby V, Bambi, Kirk's jacuzzi fling Mary Jane, Stevie J's father Moses Jordan and Beenie Man.

== Episodes ==
No. overall	No. in season	Title	Original release date	US viewers (millions)
13	1	"Back in the A"	April 22, 2013	2.94
Mimi celebrates new beginnings, but struggles to turn the page on Stevie J. Momma Dee schemes to get Scrappy away from Erica. K. Michelle takes a big step forward with her career. guest stars: Alaska Gedeon (A&R Warner Bros.), Mingnon (Erica's mother) cameo: Eva, Emani Traci is added to the opening credits. Although credited, Rasheeda, Karlie and Traci do not appear.
14	2	"She Loves Me Not"	April 29, 2013	2.86
Joseline wants Stevie to cut out the shenanigans. Drew needs Traci's help to stay in Atlanta with their child. Momma Dee springs her trap on Scrappy. guest stars: Dawn (booking agent), Mingnon cameo: Little Drew Traci and Drew join the cast. Although credited, Rasheeda and Karlie do not appear.
15	3	"Dinner Beef"	May 6, 2013	3.06
Mimi's housewarming party gets way too hot. Karlie tells Joseline a scandalous rumor about Benzino. Scrappy, Erica, and Momma Dee try to make peace over dinner, but all hell breaks loose. guest stars: Dawn (booking agent), Mingnon (Erica's mother)
16	4	"He Said, She Said"	May 13, 2013	3.06
Erica tells Scrappy she wants to pump the brakes on their engagement. Stevie and Joseline confront Benzino about the rumors he's been spreading. Traci's issues with Drew erupt when she finds a woman in his apartment. guest stars: Dawn (booking agent), Dr. Michael Randell Although credited, Rasheeda and Karlie do not appear.
17	5	"Baggage"	May 20, 2013	2.85
Joseline takes Stevie's new artist Che down a peg. Erica shows Scrappy her ringless finger. Mimi introduces her new man to K. Michelle and Ariane. Rasheeda gets big news from her doctor. guest stars: Nikko, Che Mack cameo: Little Drew, Dawn
18	6	"Making a Scene"	May 27, 2013	2.46
Rasheeda is shocked at Kirk's reaction when she tells him she's pregnant. Joseline doesn't want Stevie working with anyone but her. K. Michelle and Ariane fight with Mimi's boyfriend. guest stars: Che Mack, Nikko, Darryl Sr. (Lil Scrappy's father), Alea (Traci's sister), Johnny Crome (artist/musician) cameo: Erica Pinkett Although credited, Erica and Karlie do not appear.
19	7	"N.Y. State of Mind"	June 3, 2013	2.81
Mimi and Ariane travel to New York to fix things with K. Michelle. Joseline lashes out at Che. Drew gives Traci some devastating news about their business. Rasheeda and Kirk worry how the pregnancy will affect their finances. guest stars: Che Mack, B. Good (dog trainer) cameo: Bobby V
20	8	"Come to Daddy"	June 10, 2013	2.96
Stevie wants Joseline to apologize, but Joseline's jealous nature might destroy their whole relationship instead. Shay regrets letting Scrappy back into her life and her bed. Kirk interrupts Rasheeda's photoshoot with questions about the pregnancy. guest stars: Che Mack, Rev. Priestess Calister, Alaska Gedeon (A&R Warner Bros.), Dyana Williams (celebrity strategist), Dawn (booking agent), Nikko cameo: Little Drew, Emani Although credited, Karlie does not appear.
21	9	"The Keymaster"	June 17, 2013	3.20
Stevie drives a wedge between Mimi and Nikko. K. Michelle vows to stop brawling when her label tells her she's putting her career in jeopardy, but it isn't long before Karlie puts her to the test. Rasheeda's mother goes in on Kirk. guest stars: Nikko, Shirleen (Rasheeda's mother) cameo: Johnny Crome Although credited, Traci does not appear.
22	10	"A Failed Test"	June 24, 2013	3.12
Scrappy is accused of violating his probation and faces a possible stint in jail. Mimi has had more than enough of Nikko. Pregnant Rasheeda films a sexy video against Kirk's wishes. Erica and Shay get heated at Karlie's event. guest stars: Nikko, Mawuli M. Davis (attorney), Deb Antney (CEO Mizay Entertainment), DaShaun (fitness expert) cameo: Eva
23	11	"Mistake at the Lake"	July 1, 2013	3.23
A weekend at a lake house turns wild and Kirk ends up in hot water. Joseline reveals she wants more from Stevie. Drew tries to woo Traci away from her new boyfriend. Scrappy makes a difficult choice. guest stars: DaShaun, Shirleen, Mary Jane, Bambi cameo: Emani, Jasmine Brown, Mingnon, Bobby V
24	12	"Turnt Up"	July 8, 2013	3.49
Rasheeda confronts Kirk over his wild ways. Joseline pushes Stevie for more commitment. With Scrappy in prison, Erica takes drastic measures for financial security. Ariane auditions to sing back up on K. Michelle's tour. guest stars: Bambi (recording artist), Mary Jane (Kirk's "friend"), Mingnon (Erica's mother) cameo: Little Drew Although credited, Karlie does not appear.
25	13	"Up in Flames"	July 15, 2013	3.59
Scrappy faces his addiction problems head on. Drew does serious damage to Traci's new relationship. Joseline makes a surprise purchase. Rasheeda and her mom face off against Kirk with explosive results. guest stars: DaShaun (fitness expert), Poppa J (Stevie J's father), Mawuli M. Davis (attorney), Sala Hilaire (addiction specialist), Gerry White (social worker), Shirleen cameo: Beenie Man Although credited, Erica does not appear.
26	14	"Boriqua"	July 22, 2013	3.66
Joseline surprises Stevie with a gift and a trip. Mimi gets a makeover. Rasheeda makes a fateful decision whether she stays with Kirk. Scrappy tries to resolve things with Erica before he goes to rehab. guest stars: Shirleen, Mawuli M. Davis (attorney), Dr. Andrew Jimerson Although credited, K. Michelle and Traci do not appear.
27	15	"Lord of the Rings"	July 29, 2013	4.14
Kirk makes a big attempt to save his marriage. Erica and Momma Dee visit Scrappy in rehab. K. Michelle makes a major announcement. Stevie risks it all to get everything he wants from Joseline and Mimi. guest stars: Ariel Lessington cameo: Emani, Little Drew, Shirleen, Eva
28	16	"Reunion – Part 1"	August 5, 2013	4.19
Sparks fly when the cast reunites to settle their beefs. Mimi and Joseline call out Stevie about his double proposal. Erica and Scrappy discuss the end of their engagement. Rasheeda confronts Kirk about his betrayal. host: Mona Scott-Young house band: Zo Harris and the Reunion Show Band guest stars: Mingnon
29	17	"Reunion – Part 2"	August 12, 2013	4.12
The drama continues when the cast reunites. Rasheeda reveals the status of her relationship with Kirk. Stevie makes it rain on Nikko. Scrappy squirms in the hot seat between Erica and Shay. K. Michelle makes an announcement and gives a special goodbye performance. host: Mona Scott-Young house band: Zo Harris and the Reunion Show Band guest stars: Mingnon, Nikko

== Music ==
Several cast members had their music featured on the show and released singles to coincide with the airing of the episodes.

List of songs performed and/or featured in Love & Hip Hop: Atlanta season two
Title	Performer	Album	Episode(s)	Notes	Ref
Micolta	Joseline Hernandez	single	1, 3	performed in rehearsal and onstage	
I Just Wanna	K. Michelle	single	1	performed in studio session	
Paws	Lil Scrappy	single	2	performed in studio session	
Bring It	Karlie Redd	single	3, 9	performed in studio session played at party	
Rasheeda Got Bags	K. Michelle		4	improvisation during studio session	
Be Ya Self	Che Mack	single	5	played in studio session	
NY 2 LA	Nikko London & Johnny Crome (as Nikko N' Johnny)	single	6, 9	featured in music video	
U Gonna Learn Today	K. Michelle	0 Fucks Given	7	performed onstage	
Hit It from the Back	Rasheeda	Boss Chick Music	10	featured in music video shoot	
Shotz	Joseline Hernandez (as Ms. Joseline)	single	11, 14	played in studio session featured in music video shoot	
Bury My Heart	Ariane Davis		12	performed in audition	
Got the Draws (feat. Beenie Man)	Karlie Redd	single	13	performed onstage	
Smashed da Homie	Benzino (as Zino Grigio)	single	14	featured in music video	
V.S.O.P.	K. Michelle	Rebellious Soul	17	performed onstage at reunion	
