= Love & Hip Hop: Atlanta season 1 =

Love & Hip Hop: Atlanta
- Season 1
- DVD cover
- Starring: Joseline Hernandez; Erica Dixon; Rasheeda; K. Michelle; Karlie Redd; Mimi Faust
- No. of episodes: 12

Release
- Original network: VH1
- Original release: June 18 – September 3, 2012

Season chronology
- Next → Season 2

The first season of the reality television series Love & Hip Hop: Atlanta aired on VH1 from June 18, 2012, until September 3, 2012. The season was primarily filmed in Atlanta, Georgia. It was executively produced by Mona Scott-Young for Monami Entertainment, Toby Barraud and Stefan Springman for NFGTV, and Shelly Tatro, Brad Abramson, Danielle Gelfand and Jeff Olde for VH1. Carlos King served as co-executive producer.

The series chronicles the lives of several women and men in the Atlanta area, involved in hip hop music. It consists of 12 episodes, including a two-part reunion special hosted by Mona Scott Young.

== Production ==
On May 15, 2012, VH1 announced Love & Hip Hop: Atlanta, the Atlanta-based spin-off of Love & Hip Hop, would make its series premiere on June 18, 2012. A 5-minute long "super-trailer" was released on June 7, 2012. The series would star Stevie J's girlfriend Mimi Faust, Lil Scrappy's girlfriend Erica Dixon, Rasheeda, K. Michelle and aspiring performers Karlie Redd and Joseline Hernandez, with Stevie J, Lil Scrappy, his mother Momma Dee, Mimi's best friend Ariane Davis, Rasheeda's husband Kirk Frost, Benzino and Flavor of Love's Shay Johnson as supporting cast members.

On December 16, 2012, VH1 aired Dirty Little Secrets, a special featuring unseen footage, deleted scenes and interviews with the show's cast and producers. The special garnered 1.22 million viewers.

The season was released on DVD in region 1 on October 19, 2012.

== Synopsis ==
Atlanta, the dirty south. A city where the underdog is only one move away from making it big. The hustle is meanest here in the A, especially for the ladies. In this town, you've got to fight to get what you want, then fight even harder to keep it. For some, the battle is about trust, in the face of betrayal. For others, it's about forgiveness, and holding onto him at any cost. And when you're married to your manager, business is always personal. There's a woman fighting for the dream. Before her, stands the haters. Behind her, heartbreak. Welcome to Atlanta, the heart of the south. With every beat, there's a battle. Cause it ain't all fair, in love and hip hop.

— Mona Scott-Young, opening monologue

Mimi suspects her long time boyfriend, Grammy Award-winning singer and songwriter Stevie J, of cheating after he spends too many late nights at the studio with his new artist, Joseline. Erica is struggling to find solid ground with her daughter's father, rapper Lil Scrappy, while dealing with Scrappy's overbearing mother, Momma Dee, a former pimp, and her own mother, Mingnon, a recovering crack cocaine addict who has recently re-entered her life. Karlie is looking for her big break as an artist while K. Michelle is trying to get her career back on track after an abusive relationship with a music executive. Rasheeda is frustrated with her status as an underground rapper and is contemplating firing her husband Kirk as her manager.

=== Reception ===
After its premiere, the show's audience grew substantially over the season. Its finale garnered 5.5 million people overall, cementing its status as the highest rated show in primetime on cable among adults 18–49.

== Cast ==
=== Starring ===
- Joseline Hernandez (12 episodes)
- Erica Dixon (12 episodes)
- Rasheeda (12 episodes)
- K. Michelle (11 episodes)
- Karlie Redd (11 episodes)
- Mimi Faust (12 episodes)

=== Also starring ===
- Stevie J (12 episodes)
- Lil Scrappy (12 episodes)
- Ariane Davis (9 episodes)
- Momma Dee (8 episodes)
- Kirk Frost (10 episodes)
- Shay Johnson (7 episodes)
- Benzino (10 episodes)

Erica's mother Mingnon Dixon and Dr. Jeff appears as guest stars in several episodes. The show also features appearances from notable figures within the hip hop industry and Atlanta's social scene, including J. Que, Bryan-Michael Cox, Deb Antney, Joseline's producer Fly Dantoni, Kenny Burns, Stevie Baggs, Vincent Herbert, Stevie and Mimi's daughter Eva Jordan, Roscoe Dash and Stevie's artist Che Mack. Funkmaster Flex and Funky Dineva appear at the reunion special.

== Episodes ==
No. overall	No. in season	Title	Original release date	US viewers (millions)
1	1	"The "A" List"	June 18, 2012	1.92
Stevie J presents a new home to Mimi too far from Atlanta for her comfort. Mimi wonders if his studio sessions with Joseline involve more than just business. Scrappy tells Erica he isn't sure about their relationship. K. Michelle celebrates her birthday. guest stars: J. Que (producer) cameo: Antonio Reid Jr.
2	2	"Pregnito"	June 25, 2012	2.84
Stevie tries to make up with Mimi, but she hits him right where it hurts. Joseline accuses Karlie of being a snitch and tells her she'll decide if and when Karlie can work with Stevie. Rasheeda and Kirk shoot a music video for her new single, but fight when Rasheeda arrives late to the shoot. Erica has a heart to heart with her mom about her relationship with Scrappy and their own painful past. Joseline takes a pregnancy test. guest stars: Mingnon Kirk joins the supporting cast. Although credited, K Michelle does not appear.
3	3	"Kiss & Yell"	July 2, 2012	2.81
K. Michelle is fighting to get over her past and pours her heart out at a showcase. Scrappy confides in Momma Dee that he wants to move out of Erica's house and move on. Joseline drops a bombshell that could affect Stevie and Mimi's relationship. guest stars: B. Cox (producer), Reuben (neighbor/best friend), Jeff Robinson (music manager) cameo: Benzino
4	4	"Scrappin'"	July 9, 2012	3.39
Joseline is faced with making the toughest decision of her life. Mimi finds Stevie waiting on her doorsteps for a surprising confession. Scrappy checks Stevie for disrespecting Erica at K. Michelle's showcase and all hell breaks loose. guest stars: Mingnon (Erica's mom), Benzino (CEO, Hip Hop Weekly) Shay joins the supporting cast. Although credited, Karlie does not appear.
5	5	"No Receipts"	July 16, 2012	2.69
Mimi takes a big step in her relationship with Stevie J. Scrappy has a health scare that has an emotional effect on his future with Erica. K. Michelle finally confronts Karlie on her disrespectful ways and the two have it out. Benzino joins the supporting cast.
6	6	"No Apologies"	July 23, 2012	3.53
Stevie checks Joseline for being out of line with Mimi. Rasheeda is fed up with Kirk's management and seeks advice from a competing manager. Joseline and Mimi sit down and address their latest issue. guest stars: Queen (stylist), Deb Antney (CEO/founder, Mizay Ent.), Mingnon (Erica's mom) cameo: Tommie Lee
7	7	"Therapy?"	July 30, 2012	3.21
Karlie gets an ultimatum from her management which puts stress on her relationship with Benzino. Stevie makes a last ditch suggestion to Mimi to save their relationship. Rasheeda and Kirk make a tough decision about Kirk's place in her career. guest stars: Malcom Miles (Karlie's manager), Fly Dantoni (producer), Kenny Burns (V103 radio personality), Stevie Baggs (pro football player), Vincent Herbert (music producer), Robert (friend), Dr. Jeff Gardere (clinical psychologist)
8	8	"Three's Company"	August 6, 2012	3.34
Stevie gives Mimi an indecent proposal in an effort to save their relationship. Erica receives some disturbing news from K. Michelle. Rasheeda inadvertently betrays Kirk and the two have it out. guest stars: Kwesi James (Mimi's brother), Deb Antney (CEO/founder, Mizay Ent.), Dr. Jeff Gardere (clinical psychologist) cameo: Eva Jordan
9	9	"Loyalty Card"	August 13, 2012	3.17
Erica confronts Scrappy about Shay. Benzino and Karlie's romantic date takes a left turn. Rasheeda questions K. Michelle about her domestic abuse story. guest stars: Dr. Jeff Gardere (clinical psychologist)
10	10	"Smoke and Mirrors"	August 20, 2012	3.71
Mimi, Stevie J and Joseline return to counseling. Erica makes a decision about her relationship with Scrappy. Benzino sets up a proposal to Karlie. guest stars: Roscoe Dash (rapper), Dr. Jeff Gardere (clinical psychologist), Che Mack (artist) cameo: Shirleen Harvell
11	11	"Reunion – Part 1"	August 27, 2012	4.10
The cast reunites, going over past beefs and triumphs. K. Michelle comes after Karlie and Rasheeda. Scrappy and Erica discuss their fight with Stevie and Joseline. Joseline and Mimi come face to face. host: Mona Scott-Young guest stars: Funkmaster Flex, Funky Dineva
12	12	"Reunion – Part 2"	September 3, 2012	4.40
The drama continues. Joseline opens up about her relationship with her parents in some previously unseen footage. Scrappy has a proposal for Erica. host: Mona Scott-Young guest stars: Funkmaster Flex, Funky Dineva

== Webisodes ==
=== Bonus scenes ===
Deleted and extended scenes from the season's episodes were released weekly as bonus content on VH1's official website, as well as the season's DVD release.

One scene features Kalenna Harper, who would join the cast in a larger role in season three. Another scene features a cameo from Kelsie Frost, who would join the cast in a larger role in season five. Dondria and Frank Walker also appear.

List of Love & Hip Hop: Atlanta Season 1 bonus scenes

Episode	Title	Featured cast members	Ref
1	"Bury My Heart" (Extended scene)	K. Michelle, J. Que, Dondria	
1	"Studio Situation" (Extended scene)	Mimi, Stevie J, Joseline	
1	"Nightclub Outing"	Joseline, Rasheeda, Karlie, K. Michelle, Kalenna	
2	"Rasheeda's Video Shoot"	Rasheeda, Kirk	
2	"Momma Dee's Housewarming Party"	Momma Dee, Erica, Mingnon	
3	"Music Review"	K. Michelle, Rasheeda	
3	"Bury My Heart Live" (Extended scene)	K. Michelle	
3	"Cuckoo for Cocoa Puffs"	K. Michelle, Karlie	
3	"Run Your Mouth" (Extended scene)	Joseline, Mimi, Stevie J	
4	"Show Your True Colors"	Stevie J, Mimi	
4	"Love Lessons"	Stevie J, Benzino	
5	"Miss Late Ain't Fast Enough"	Rasheeda, Kirk	
5	"K. Michelle & Karlie Fight" (Extended scene)	K. Michelle, Karlie, Mimi	
5	"Big Homie"	Erica, K. Michelle, Rasheeda	
6	"Worlds of Wisdom" (Extended scene)	Rasheeda, Deb	
6	"That's What Friends Are For"	K. Michelle, Rasheeda	
6	"Benzino Cooks"	Benzino, Karlie	
7	"Like The Other Guys I've Dated"	K. Michelle, Frank Walker	
7	"I Was Pregnant with Your Baby... Did You Forget?"	Stevie J, Joseline	
7	"Therapy Session" (Extended scene)	Stevie J, Mimi, Dr. Jeff	
8	"Vacation"	K. Michelle, Rasheeda	
8	"Frenemies"	K. Michelle, Shay	
8	"It's All in the Thighs" (Extended scene)	Karlie, Joseline	
9	"Follie's" (Extended scene)	Stevie J, Benzino	
9	"Afraid of Horses"	Erica, Scrappy	
9	"Blame Game"	Joseline, Carmen, Luis	
10	"Renew Wedding Vows" (Extended scene)	Rasheeda, Kirk, Scrappy, Shirleen, Kelsie, Ky	
10	"Jumping Ship" (Extended scene)	Joseline, Mimi, Stevie J, Dr. Jeff	

== Music ==
Several cast members had their music featured on the show and released singles to coincide with the airing of the episodes.

List of songs performed and/or featured in Love & Hip Hop: Atlanta season one
Title	Performer	Album	Episode(s)	Notes	Ref
Bury My Heart	K. Michelle	0 Fucks Given	1, 3, 7	performed in studio session and onstage	
Marry Me	Rasheeda	Boss Chick Music	2, 6	featured in music video shoot	
Louie, Prada, Gucci (feat. Maino)	Karlie Redd	single	5	performed onstage	
Kiss My Ass	K. Michelle	single	7	performed in studio session	
Bailar	Joseline Hernandez	single	7	performed in studio session	
Bags (feat. Chinky Brown & Rasheeda)	Lil Scrappy	The Grustle	8	played in studio session performed onstage	
