= Love & Hip Hop: Atlanta season 9 =

Season of television series

Love & Hip Hop: Atlanta
- Season 9
- Cover used by the iTunes Store
- Starring: Rasheeda; Mimi Faust; Karlie Redd; Spice; Scrapp DeLeon; Yung Joc; Lil Scrappy; Sierra Gates; Stevie J
- No. of episodes: 9

Release
- Original network: VH1
- Original release: March 16 – May 11, 2020

Season chronology
- ← Previous; Season 8 Next → Season 10

The ninth season of the reality television series Love & Hip Hop: Atlanta first aired on VH1 from March 16, 2020 until May 11, 2020. The season was primarily filmed in Atlanta, Georgia. It is executive produced by Mona Scott-Young and Stephanie R. Gayle for Monami Entertainment and Dan Cesareo, Lucilla D'Agostino, Donna Edge Rachell, Jamail Shelton, Paris Bauldwin and Emily Terkell for Big Fish Entertainment. Nina L. Diaz, Sitarah Pendelton, Lashan Browning and Phakiso Collins are executive producers for VH1.

The series chronicles the lives of several women and men in the Atlanta area, involved in hip hop music.

== Production ==
Season nine of Love & Hip Hop: Atlanta began filming in December 2019.

On February 17, 2020, VH1 announced Love & Hip Hop: Atlanta would be returning for a ninth season on March 16, 2020. New cast members would include Alexis Skyy, Ki'yomi Leslie and LightSkinKeisha. Scrapp Deleon's sister Cheyenne also appears in a minor supporting role, with Love & Hip Hop: New York's Erica Mena and Safaree Samuels making special crossover appearances during the season.

Production on the season was affected by the 2019–20 coronavirus pandemic, with cast members filming their green screen confessional scenes while quarantined at home (as seen from the season's fourth episode onwards). The ninth episode would act as the season's finale, and include scenes of the show's behind-the-scenes struggles as production was forcibly shut down. The remaining episodes of the season were postposed indefinitely due to the virus.

== Synopsis ==
We all out here grindin', trying to take care of our families and rewrite Atlanta's history for our kids. A lot has happened over the years, but your favourite cuz Yung Joc has finally grown up. And I must say, I'm proud to see my friends acting grown and settling down too. We've all hit speedbumps on our journeys. For some of us, all it took was the right woman to make a man out of the boys and get our priorities straight. But a bright future doesn't change a messy past. Some of us were shocked to learn that it's the ones you love that hurt you the most, and even more shocked to learn that when it's really worth it, when your whole family's at stake, you can forgive almost anything. It took growin', some fussin' and fightin' along the way for all of us to find our people. That's what you need, your people and your fam. But love is tricky, and heartache can take years to heal. Hitch yourself your wagon to the wrong star, you just might find your whole world turned upside down when all you want is to find the one. And the ones you thought had your back for life no longer do. And sometimes, even when we're trying to put our family first, we find ourselves in times so dire that no one can save us from the storm. So hug your loved ones tight and watch your back. Because in the A, baby, it ain't all peaches and cream.

— Yung Joc, opening monologue

== Cast ==
=== Starring ===
- Rasheeda (6 episodes)
- Mimi Faust (9 episodes)
- Karlie Redd (9 episodes)
- Spice (9 episodes)
- Scrapp DeLeon (6 episodes)
- Yung Joc (8 episodes)
- Lil Scrappy (8 episodes)
- Sierra Gates (8 episodes)
- Stevie J (3 episodes)

=== Also starring ===
- Momma Dee (6 episodes)
- Shooter Gates (9 episodes)
- Kendra Robinson (5 episodes)
- Kirk Frost (7 episodes)
- BK Brasco (6 episodes)
- Alexis Skyy (5 episodes)
- LightSkinKeisha (4 episodes)
- Shekinah Anderson (7 episodes)
- Akbar V (5 episodes)
- Bambi Benson (9 episodes)
- Ki'yomi Leslie (5 episodes)
- Tokyo Vanity (4 episodes)
- Karen King (4 episodes)
- Cee Cee (3 episodes)
- Cheyenne Robinson (6 episodes)
- Safaree Samuels (3 episodes)
- Erica Mena (3 episodes)

Ernest Bryant, Shirleen Harvell, Erica Dixon and Sharonda Official return in guest roles.

== Episodes ==
| No. overall | No. in season | Title | Original release date | US viewers (millions) |
|---|---|---|---|---|
| 143 | 1 | "Bobbit It Off!" | March 16, 2020 | 1.45 |
Kirk and Rasheeda's 20th anniversary party goes left when Alexis Skyy comes for Karlie. Sierra fights for her freedom. Joc is horrified when Kendra asks him to get snipped. Momma Dee is in a health crisis. Karlie has been keeping a shocking secret. guest stars: Eva, Bonnie (Stevie's daughter), Sade (Stevie's daughter), Bambi, Austin (Momma Dee's assistant), Shirleen, Kirk Jr., Kandi Burruss, Thomas Frost (Kirk’s father) cameo: Savannah Jordan, Ty, Ky Frost, Kelsie Frost, Ernest Bryant, Erica Dixon Scrappy and Sierra are added to the opening credits. Alexis joins the supporting cast. Although credited, Scrapp does not appear.
| 144 | 2 | "No Witness, No Protection" | March 23, 2020 | 1.48 |
There’s trouble in paradise for besties Sierra and Karlie. Up and coming rap superstar LightSkinKeisha is on the scene with her man by her side. Karlie and Alexis bond over a shared enemy and Scrappy continues to fear for Momma Dee's life. guest stars: Erica, Ty, Coca Vango, Kim (Sierra’s mom), Trina (Sierra’s assistant), Adamma (Sierra’s lawyer), Bert Brock (Karlie’s attorney), Ernest, D. Rushing (Sierra’s stylist), Malaysia, Toya cameo: Tiffany Foxx LightSkinKeisha joins the supporting cast. Although credited, Scrapp and Stevie J do not appear.
| 145 | 3 | "Oh Deer" | March 30, 2020 | 1.45 |
Former besties Karlie and Sierra are left reeling after their brawl. Bambi has it out for alleged homewrecker LightSkinKeisha. Stevie uncovers Mimi's deep seated abandonment issues. Scrappy is worried Momma Dee is drinking again. guest stars: Trina (Sierra’s assistant), Coca Vango, Shirleen, Ernest, Tokyo, Karen King, Cee Cee, Adamma (Sierra's lawyer) cameo: Tiffany Foxx
| 146 | 4 | "Queen of Atlanta" | April 6, 2020 | 1.45 |
Akbar goes to war with LightSkinKeisha over her throne as the queen of Atlanta. Scrappy and Bambi seek peace for their family, but their moms have other plans in mind. Newbie Ki'yomi Leslie is on the scene. And Shooter juggles his messy love life. guest stars: Coca Vango, Kevin (Kirk’s brother), Ernest, Emani, Jazzy McBee (radio host); Ki'yomi and Cheyenne join the supporting cast. Although credited, Rasheeda, Sierra and Stevie J do not appear.
| 147 | 5 | "Slippery Slope" | April 13, 2020 | 1.35 |
Rasheeda decides to whisk the girls away for a ski trip, but a family crisis gets in the way. Sierra and Shooter are also in crisis when their daughter is assaulted at school. Alexis opens up about her traumatic past. And a family feud turns nasty. guest stars: Paris, Sharonda (Joc’s business partner), Carla Miles (survivor & advocate), Toni D. Rivera (survivor & advocate), Carla Stephens (social activist); Although credited, Stevie J does not appear.
| 148 | 6 | "You Trippin" | April 20, 2020 | 1.32 |
The ski trip gets off to a dramatic start as the ladies take pregnancy tests. Spice and Shekinah butt heads. All hell breaks loose as Shooter's messy love triangle implodes. Newlyweds Safaree and Erica witness Cheyenne and Ki'yomi coming face to face. guest stars: Isaac (private chef), Meda; Safaree and Erica Mena join the supporting cast. Although credited, Rasheeda does not appear.
| 149 | 7 | "Black Diamond" | April 27, 2020 | 1.35 |
Karlie and Sierra have an emotional heart to heart on the ski trip. Shekinah and Spice's feud rages on. Shooter's messy love triangle goes up in flames after Cheyenne and Ki’yomi come face to face. Sierra catches BK cheating. guest stars: Tiffany Foxx; Although credited, Rasheeda, Scrappy and Stevie J do not appear.
| 150 | 8 | "The Kids Are Alright" | May 4, 2020 | 1.23 |
Bambi breaks the news to Scrappy about baby number two, leaving Momma Dee feeling left out of the palace. Kirk and Rasheeda pick up the pieces when Kirk Jr is released from prison. And a vengeful BK turns the cheating rumors back on Sierra. guest stars: Kirk Jr, Tiffany Foxx, Phyllis (Kendra’s mom), Vickie (Joc’s mom), Asia & Alicia (Kendra’s friends), Trina (Sierra’s assistant); Although credited, Joc and Stevie J do not appear.
| 151 | 9 | "Shut It Down" | May 11, 2020 | 1.24 |
Coronavirus cases in Atlanta explode leaving everyone wondering how they'll make ends meet. All hell breaks loose when Akbar comes face to face with her many enemies at Spice's pop up shop. guest stars: Coca Vango, Slick Two Three (director), Justin (supervising producer); Although credited, Scrapp and Stevie J do not appear.

== Webisodes ==
=== Check Yourself ===
Love & Hip Hop Atlanta: Check Yourself, which features the cast's reactions to each episode, was released weekly with every episode on digital platforms.

List of Love & Hip Hop Atlanta: Check Yourself Season 9 episodes

| Episode | Title | Featured cast members | Ref |
|---|---|---|---|
| 1 | "Snipping and Snapping" | Scrappy, Akbar, Karen King, Bambi | |
| 2 | "Sierra's Trust Issues" | Karen King, Akbar, Karlie, Scrappy | |
| 3 | "Bambi's Drama with LightSkinKeisha & Sierra's Plea to Karlie" | Momma Dee, Akbar, Karlie, Karen King, Bambi | |

=== Bonus scenes ===
Deleted scenes from the season's episodes were released weekly as bonus content on VH1's official website.

List of Love & Hip Hop: Atlanta Season 9 bonus scenes

| Episode | Title | Featured cast members | Ref |
|---|---|---|---|
| 1 | "Yung Joc and Kendra Get a Lesson on the Male Anatomy" (Extended scene) | Joc, Kendra | |
| 2 | "Bambi Urges Sierra to Tone Down Her Drinking" (Extended scene) | Bambi, Sierra | |
| 3 | "Momma Dee and Ms. Shirleen Hit Up a Hair Boutique" | Momma Dee | |
| 5 | "Human Trafficking Survivors Share Their Stories" (Special extended scene) | Joc, Kendra, Akbar, Alexis | |
