= LightSkinKeisha =

American rapper (born 1994)

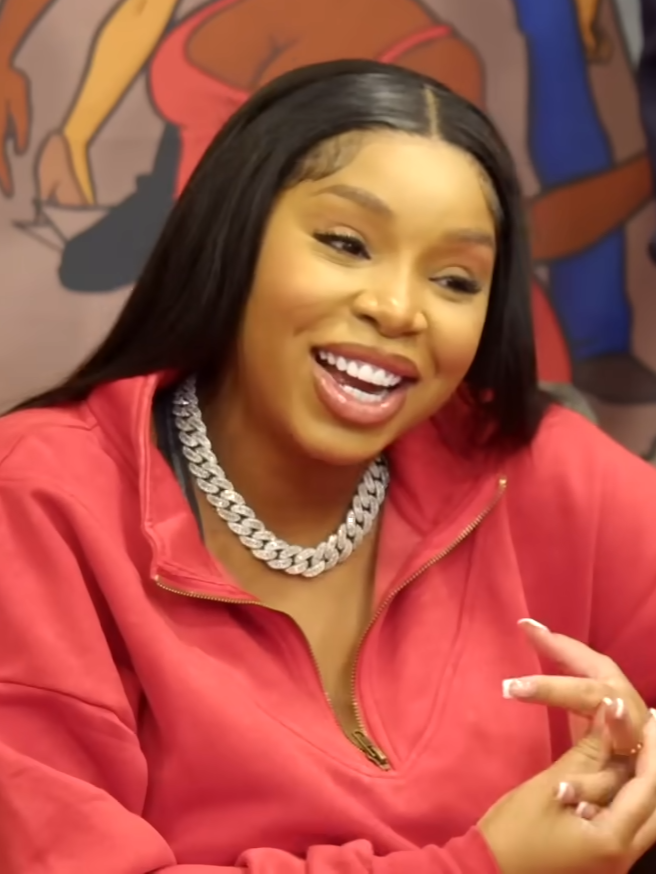
- LightSkinKeisha in 2024
- Born: Samantha Deshaun; September 4, 1998 (age 28); Decatur, Georgia, U.S.
- Other name: Big Bank Beisha
- Occupations: Rapper; singer; songwriter; actress; influencer
- Years active: 2014–present
- Spouse: Coca Vango (m. 2024)
- Children: 1
- Musical career
- Origin: Atlanta, Georgia, U.S.
- Genres: Hip hop; R&B
- Instruments: Vocals
- Label: Hitco

Samantha Deshaun (born September 4, 1998), known professionally as LightSkinKeisha, is an American rapper, singer, songwriter, actress, and influencer. She started her online career in 2014, posting comedic videos to Instagram and YouTube, several of which went viral.

She released her debut single as a rapper, "Weather", in 2017. After signing with L.A. Reid's record label Hitco in 2018, she released six mixtapes from 2018 to 2023: That's Just the Bottom Line (2018)—which featured her breakout singles "Believe Dat" and "Ride Good"—Act Up SZN (2019), Talk That Talk, Clones (both 2020), Break the Bank (2021), and Thought I Was Done? (2023).

On television, she appeared on the ninth season of the reality television series Love & Hip Hop: Atlanta (2020) and made her acting debut as BruShandria Carmichael on the Starz television series Power Book II: Ghost (2020–2024).

== Life and career ==
Samantha Deshaun was born on September 4, 1999 in Decatur, Georgia and raised in Atlanta by a single mother along with her seven siblings. She started cheerleading competitively at age 7 and competed for 13 years until she began working in the service industry.

LightSkinKeisha's stage name was inspired by the character Kisha from the 1998 film Belly, whom she described as "dark-skin Kisha". She first became popular as an influencer for comedic videos she posted to her Instagram and YouTube accounts starting in 2014, wherein she discussed her relationships and everyday life. A video of her rapping about "burnt pussy lips" went viral and soundtracked twerking videos on YouTube and Dubsmash. Her debut single as a rapper, "Weather", was released on SoundCloud in the summer of 2017 and gained traction on the service. She released her single "Treadmill" in June 2018 along with an animated web series for the song. Her song "Believe Dat" was released in August 2018 with a music video filmed at Magic City. In 2018, LightSkinKeisha was signed to the L.A. Reid-owned record label, Hitco. Her debut mixtape, That's Just the Bottom Line, was released in December 2018 and included "Believe Dat" and her breakout song "Ride Good" featuring B. Smyth. On July 26, 2019, she released the mixtape Act Up SZN on streaming through Hitco.

LightSkinKeisha was nominated for the iHeartRadio Music Award for Best New R&B Artist in 2020. LightSkinKeisha released the mixtapes Talk That Talk and Clones in February and September 2020, respectively, with "B.R.A.T." (featuring Blac Youngsta) released as the lead single of Clones. She was featured on the Saucy Santana song "Back It Up", which was released as a single from his debut album, Pretty Little Gangsta, in August 2020 with a music video. She released her mixtape Break the Bank in 2021, which was preceded by the singles "Blue Hunnids" and "Freaky Dancer", which featured Trina. Her single "Pop Shit Queen" was released in February 2022. She released the project Thought I Was Done? in May 2023.

LightSkinKeisha appeared on the reality television series Love & Hip Hop: Atlanta in its ninth season in 2020. Also in 2020, she began starring on the Courtney A. Kemp-created Starz crime drama television series Power Book II: Ghost as BruShandria Carmichael, an outspoken college student, and appeared on the show's first three seasons.

== Musical style ==
LightSkinKeisha's music is hip hop and R&B. Chris Kelly of The Washington Post wrote in 2019 that LightSkinKeisha's music "offer[ed] sexually empowered lyrics and the outsize swagger of [her] male counterparts". Aleia Woods of XXL described her rapping flow as "in-your-face", while The Source wrote that she had a "demanding attitude" in her music. Robyn Mowatt of Okayplayer wrote that LightSkinKeisha's music was "filled with brash soliloquies and catchy lines paired with bouncy trap beats".

== Personal life ==
LightSkinKeisha has stated that she was homeless in early 2018 and alternated between living in hotels and in her car. LightSkinKeisha got engaged to rapper Coca Vango in 2022 and married him in January 2024. Their son, Amin, was born on January 14, 2024.

== Discography ==
=== Mixtapes ===
List of extended plays, with selected details
Title	Details
That's Just the Bottom Line	Released: December 14, 2018; Label: Craft Recordings; Formats: Digital download, streaming
Act Up SZN	Released: July 29, 2019; Label: Self-released; Formats: Digital download, streaming
Talk That Talk	Released: February 11, 2020; Label: Self-released; Formats: Digital download, streaming
Clones	Released: September 2, 2020; Label: Self-released; Formats: Digital download, streaming
Break the Bank	Released: October 14, 2021; Label: Self-released; Formats: Digital download, streaming
Thought I Was Done?	Released: May 16, 2023; Label: Self-released; Formats: Digital download, streaming

=== Singles ===
==== As lead artist ====
List of singles as lead artist, with selected chart positions
Title	Year	Peak chart positions	Album
Title	Year	US R&B/HH Air.	Album
"Weather"	2017	—	Non-album singles
"Cash Shit"	2017	—	Non-album singles
"Treadmill"	2018	—	Non-album singles
"Believe Dat"	2018	39	That's Just the Bottom Line
"Ride Good" (featuring B. Smyth)	2018	26	That's Just the Bottom Line
"I'm Gucci"	2018	—	That's Just the Bottom Line
"Hey LightSkin" (featuring Yella Beezy)	2019	—	Non-album single
"On Read" (featuring Kash Doll)	2019	—	Act Up SZN
"PBWA"	2019	—	Talk That Talk
"Queen Kong"	2020	—	Clones
"B.R.A.T." (featuring Blac Youngsta)	2020	—	Clones
"FDH"	2021	—	Break the Bank
"Sheesh" (with Kissie Lee)	2021	—	My Love
"Drama"	2021	—	Non-album single
"Blue Hunnids"	2021	—	Break the Bank
"Margarita"	2021	—	Break the Bank
"Freaky Dancer" (featuring Trina)	2021	—	Break the Bank
"Pop Shit Queen"	2022	—	Thought I Was Done?
"Play Me"	2022	—	Thought I Was Done?
"Gimme Head"	2022	—	Thought I Was Done?
"Ass on Me"	2023	—	Thought I Was Done?
"Fine AF"	2023	—	Non-album single

==== As featured artist ====
List of singles as featured artist
Title	Year	Album
"Poppin' Champagne" (Showtime Showtime featuring LightSkinKeisha)	2017	Non-album single
"Sassy" (Blacc Zacc featuring LightSkinKeisha)	2019	Trappin Like Zacc
"On His Face" (Trina featuring LightSkinKeisha)	2019	The One
"Atlanta" (Stevie B. featuring LightSkinKeisha)	2019	Non-album single
"Back It Up" (Saucy Santana featuring LightSkinKeisha)	2020	Pretty Little Gangsta
"Falling Apart" (Lil Migo featuring LightSkinKeisha)	2020	Non-album single
"It's a Vibe" (Saucy Santana featuring LightSkinKeisha and DreamDoll)	2020	It's a Vibe
"Top Bitch" (Chinese Kitty featuring LightSkinKeisha)	2021	SMD
"I'm Dat Girl" (36 Rich featuring LightSkinKeisha)	2022	Non-album singles
"Outside" (J3X featuring LightSkinKeisha)	2022	Non-album singles

==== Guest appearances ====
List of guest appearances
Title	Year	Other artist(s)	Album
"Do It"	2018	Latto	Mulatto
"Light Skin Like Keisha"	2018	Ace Cino	Mafia Life
"Okay Bitch"	2018	Tokyo Vanity, Tasha Catour	B.A.P.S
"Snow"	2018	Coca Vango	Jugg Baby
"4 Play"	2019	L.I. Tha Great	The Collective Project
"Nasty Wit It"	2019	Nechie	SSN: Southside Nechi (The Full Story)
"Freak Freak"	2019	Coca Vango, Renni Rucci	Mr. Vango
"Gymnastics"	2019	Trip Rexx	Lopsided
"PowerPuff Girls"	2020	Kelow LaTesha, Rico Nasty	TSA
"Bankroll"	2020	Coca Vango	From Rags to Jugg Riches

== Filmography ==
Year	Title	Role	Note
2019	Wild 'n Out	Herself	Episode: "Ski Mask the Slump God/LightSkinKeisha"
2020	Love & Hip Hop: Atlanta	Herself	Recurring (season 9)
2020–2024	Power Book II: Ghost	BruShandria Carmichael	Recurring role; 22 episodes
2022	The Real Housewives of Atlanta	Herself	Episode: "The Edge of Fashion"
