= Just Brittany =

American singer-songwriter (born 1989)

- Born: Brittany Bullock; June 11, 1989 (age 36); Houston, Texas, U.S.
- Genres: R&B; hip-hop
- Years active: 2011–present
- Labels: Cash Money; Nexus Entertainment; The Narrators; Just Brittany; Maybach Music Group

Brittany Bullock (born June 11, 1989), better known by her stage name Just Brittany, is an American singer-songwriter, rapper, and reality television personality from Houston, Texas.

== Life and career ==
Bullock was raised in the Fifth Ward section of Houston, and attended Worthing High School. After graduating from Jesse Jackson Academy at 16, Bullock began to focus on her music career. In 2010, she released "Call Me for That Good" (#89 R&B), which gained attention from record label Cash Money Records. A second single by Bullock, "Slumber Party", peaked at No. 82 R&B. In 2011, her third single, "Color", peaked at No. 82 R&B. In that same year, she released an EP, Not Just a Pretty Face. In 2013, she released two mixtapes, titled Queen of H-Town. A song from the first version of the mixtape, "Slow Bangin'", gained attention and was in rotation on radio. In 2014, she released a CD, Something Different, and appeared in an interview with Houston-based magazine, Houston Trend Magazine, to talk about her career. In 2015, after Rihanna's song, "Bitch Better Have My Money" came out, Bullock and fans accused Rihanna plagiarising Bullock's 2014 song, titled "Better Have My Money", from Something Different. Bullock later deleted her tweet on her response of the allegations. In 2016, her debut studio album, Stripped, was released. In 2017, she appeared on the VH1 television series, Signed, and worked with Rick Ross on the show, who signed her to his label, Maybach Music Group. On July 31, 2017, her second studio album, Brittany Houston, was released, appearing on ITunes, which she described as "unexpected". In 2018, she joined the supporting cast of Love & Hip Hop: Atlanta for Season 7.

== Discography ==
=== Albums and EPs ===
- Not Just a Pretty Face (2011, Cash Money)
- Queen of H-Town (2013, The Narrators)
- Stripped (2016, Just Brittany)
- Brittany Houston (2017, Just Brittany)
- I'm Not a Rapper (2018, Just Brittany)
- The Gemini in Me (2022, Just Brittany)
- Round Trip (2025 musicXchange)

=== Singles ===
Year	Song title	US R&B Charts
2010	"Call Me for That Good"	89
2010	"Slumber Party"	82
2011	"Color"	82

== Filmography ==
=== Television ===
Year	Title	Role	Notes	Ref.
2017	Love & Hip Hop: Atlanta	Herself	Supporting Cast S7	
2017	Signed	Herself	Winning Contestant	
