= Lovely Mimi =

Vietnamese-American media personality (born 1990)

- Born: Myha Thi Luong; April 27, 1990; Đồng Nai, Vietnam
- Occupation: Media personality
- Spouse: Remy Skinner (m. 2010; div. 2019)
- Children: 2

Myha Thi Luong (born April 27, 1990) known professionally as Lovely Mimi is an Vietnamese-American media personality. She is rose to prominence as a cast member of VH1 Love & Hip Hop: Atlanta in 2017.

== Early life ==
Myha Thi Luong was born on April 27, 1990 in Đồng Nai, Vietnam to her late father Tien who died in 2013. She moved to Silver Spring, Maryland, United States when she was three years old while her parents were having refugees. As a child, she was known as "Myha Bling Bling" and later known as a "Lovely Mimi" as a stage name. As a teenager, she moved to Atlanta, Georgia to opened an nail salon before she pursue her career.

== Career ==
On March 27, 2017 she joined as cast member of American reality television series by VH1 Love & Hip Hop: Atlanta during its season six as a supporting cast member.

== Personal life ==
In June 2019, Mimi was arrested due to possession of ecstasy at Cherokee Valley River Casino in Cherokee County, North Carolina.

== Filmography ==
Year	Title	Role	Notes
2017	Love & Hip Hop: Atlanta	Herself	Supporting cast; Season 7
2021	Wild 'n Out	Guest	
