= DJ Babey Drew =

American DJ (born 1980)

- Born: Andrew Bisnaught; July 6, 1980 (age 46); Queens, New York City, U.S.
- Origin: Queens, New York City, U.S.
- Genres: EDM, Top40
- Occupations: DJ, Radio Personality, Actor, music producer
- Instruments: Turntables, keyboards
- Website: www.djbabeydrew.com

Andrew Bisnaught (born July 6, 1980), better known by his stage name DJ Babey Drew, is an American DJ, Grammy-winning record producer, actor, radio and television personality. He is a DJ for Atlanta-based radio station Power 96.1. He is also known from the VH1 reality show Love & Hip Hop: Atlanta and the movie Push, in which he plays Delroy.

== Filmography ==
=== Film ===
Year	Title	Role
2015	Push	Delroy

=== Television ===
Year	Title	Role
2013	Love & Hip Hop: Atlanta	Himself
