= Momma Dee =

Actress, singer and reality television personality

- Born: Deborah Gaither; September 21, 1963 (age 62); Atlanta, Georgia, U.S.
- Occupations: Reality television personality; Singer; Actress
- Years active: 2012–present
- Spouse: Ernest Bryant (m. 1996-2014; m. 2015)
- Relatives: Jasmine Brown (daughter) Lil Scrappy (son)
- Website: tharealmommadee.com

Deborah Bryant (née Gaither; born September 21, 1963), better known as Momma Dee, is an actress, singer and reality television personality, best known for her appearances on the VH1 hit reality show Love & Hip Hop: Atlanta. She is the mother of rapper and fellow Love & Hip Hop cast member Lil Scrappy.

== Early life ==
Dee was born in 1963 in Atlanta, Georgia and attended Decatur, Georgia and Turner High. She graduated with an associate degree in nursing at Georgia State University. In 1996, Dee was involved in a car accident that left her in a wheelchair for three years. Unable to work a traditional job due to her disability, Dee became a pimp and drug dealer to provide for her family. She ran a brothel for ten years under the name "Lady Dee".

== Career ==
Starting in 2012, Dee appeared with her son, rapper Lil Scrappy, as a supporting cast member on Love & Hip Hop: Atlanta. On the show, she details her own fledgling music career, documenting the recording and releasing of the singles "I Deserve" and "In That Order".

In 2016, she embarked on an acting venture, appearing as a pimp in the independent film The Products of the American Ghetto, as well as portraying the mother of the titular character in About Justin, a spin-off of the LGBT web series About Him (2015).

== Personal life ==
Dee married Ernest Bryant in 1996, divorcing in 2014. The two later reunited and remarried in 2015, with their wedding documented on the fourth season finale episode of Love & Hip Hop: Atlanta. The couple was later featured on the court television program Couples Court with the Cutlers over concerns of infidelity on her part; the two reconciled at the end of the episode.

Dee has two children, daughter Jasmine Brown and son Darryl Richardson, Jr. (best known as Lil Scrappy). Her cousin is the rapper Yung Joc, who also appears on Love & Hip Hop, and produced and rapped on her single "In That Order".

== Discography ==
=== Singles ===
Year	Single
2014	"I Deserve"
2016	"In That Order" (feat. Yung Joc)

== Filmography ==
=== Films ===
Film
Year	Title	Role	Notes
2016	About Justin		
2018	The Products of the American Ghetto	Mamma Dee	(as Deborah Bryant)
2018	My Side Piece Hit The Lotto	Fran	(as Deborah Bryant)
2021	Christmas on My Block	Queen	
2021	3 Keys	Momma	

=== Television ===
Year	Series	Role	Notes
2012–2026	Love & Hip Hop: Atlanta	Herself	61 episodes
2015	Love & Hip Hop Live: The Wedding	Herself	
2015	Love & Hip Hop Atlanta: After Party Live	Herself	3 episodes
2020	Couples Court with the Cutlers	Herself	1 episode
2022	Momma Dee's Royal Love Affair	Herself	13 episodes
2022	Strip		12 episodes
2022	Coming Out	Herself	1 episode
