= List of Love & Hip Hop television specials =

The Love & Hip Hop franchise has spawned 19 television specials broadcast on VH1, featuring cast members from Love & Hip Hop: New York, Love & Hip Hop: Atlanta, Love & Hip Hop: Hollywood and Love & Hip Hop: Miami.

The franchise focuses on the personal and professional lives of several hip hop and R&B recording artists, music executives and record producers residing in various metropolitan areas of the United States.

== Specials ==
No. overall	No. in season	Title	Original release date	U.S. viewers (millions)
1	S1/SP101	"Love & Hip Hop Atlanta: Dirty Little Secrets"	December 16, 2012	1.22
This special, hosted by Mona Scott-Young, features never before seen footage, casting tapes, interviews and bloopers from the first season of Love & Hip Hop: Atlanta. featuring: K. Michelle, Rasheeda & Kirk Frost, Stevie J & Mimi Faust, Momma Dee, Karlie Redd, Erica Dixon & Lil Scrappy, Benzino, Joseline Hernandez, Shay Johnson guest stars: Funky Dineva, Carlos King (co-executive producer), Stephanie Gayle (co-executive producer), Stefan Springman (executive producer)
2a	S4/SP101	"40 Greatest Love & Hip Hop Moments – Part 1"	October 24, 2013	N/A
This 2 hour clip show, hosted by Mona Scott-Young and airing days before the premiere of season four of Love & Hip Hop: New York, showcases the franchise's most "shocking, scandalous and dramatic Love & Hip Hop moments". This first part counts down the 40th to 21st greatest Love & Hip Hop moments, featuring clips from the show's first three seasons, as well as the first two seasons of its spin-off Love & Hip Hop: Atlanta. featuring: Yandy Smith, Rich Dollaz, Mama Jones, K. Michelle, Stevie J, Joseline, Momma Dee, Lil Scrappy guest stars: Funky Dineva, Stefan Springman (executive producer)
2b	S4/SP102	"40 Greatest Love & Hip Hop Moments – Part 2"	October 24, 2013	N/A
This second part counts down the 20th to 1st greatest Love & Hip Hop moments, featuring clips from the show's first three seasons, as well as the first two seasons of its spin-off Love & Hip Hop: Atlanta, as well as interviews with the cast and crew. featuring: Yandy Smith, Rich Dollaz, Mama Jones, K. Michelle, Stevie J, Joseline, Momma Dee, Lil Scrappy guest stars: Funky Dineva, Stefan Springman (executive producer)
3	S5/SP101	"Love & Hip Hop Live: The Wedding"	May 25, 2015	2.04
This 2 hour live special, hosted by Nina Parker with Big Tigger and Love & Hip Hop: Atlanta's Stevie J, features the wedding ceremony between Love & Hip Hop: New York cast members Yandy Smith and Mendeecees Harris. It aired a month after season five of Love & Hip Hop: New York and in between the fifth and sixth episodes of season four of Love & Hip Hop: Atlanta. The show features appearances from various Love & Hip Hop: New York and Atlanta cast members, as well as other VH1 reality stars, including cast mates from Love & Hip Hop: Hollywood, Black Ink Crew, Mob Wives, as well as from Bravo's The Real Housewives of Atlanta. The special was preceded by six exclusive webisodes that were made available on VH1's website from May 12, 2015. Love & Hip Hop Live: The Wedding was executive produced by Mona Scott-Young and Stephanie Gayle for Monami Entertainment and Toby Barraud, Stefan Springman, Mala Chapple and Robyn Nish Friedman for Eastern TV, and Susan Levison, Nina L. Diaz, Vivian Gomez and Ken Martinez for VH1. Yandy Smith-Harris also served as co-executive producer. featuring: Yandy Smith, Mendeecees Harris guest stars: Laura Smith (Yandy's mom), Juelz Santana, Kandi Burruss, Joseline Hernandez, Kimbella Vanderhee, Ray J & Princess Love, Lil Mendeecees (best man), Rasheeda & Kirk Frost, Tara Wallace & Peter Gunz, Lil Scrappy & Bambi, Karen Gravano & Renee Graziano, Ceaser Emanual & Dutchess Lattimore, Yung Joc, K. Michelle, Judy Harris (mother of the groom), Kim Wallace, Momma Dee, Karlie Redd, Ariane Davis, Marlo Hampton, Mama Jones, Rich Dollaz & Moniece Slaughter, Ralph Smith (Yandy's father), Mona Scott-Young
4	S2/SP101	"Love & Hip Hop: Out in Hip Hop"	October 19, 2015	1.50
This round-table discussion, moderated by T. J. Holmes of ABC News, with Love & Hip Hop: Hollywood cast members Milan Christopher and Miles Brock and a panel of rappers, performers and activists, focuses on the reality of being openly LGBT in the hip hop community. It aired after the seventh episode of the second season of Love & Hip Hop: Hollywood, which featured bisexual cast member Miles coming out to his ex-girlfriend Amber. Out in Hip Hop was executive produced by Mona Scott-Young and Stephanie Gayle for Monami Entertainment and Toby Barraud, Stefan Springman, Mala Chapple and Robyn Nish Friedman for Eastern TV. Susan Levison, Nina L. Diaz, Vivian Gomez, and Ken Martinez executive produce for VH1. featured panelists: Milan Christopher, Miles Brock additional panelists: Big Freedia, Buttahman, Cakes da Killa, Chuck Creekmur, Clay Cane, D. Smith, DMC, Emil Wilbekin, Fly Young Red, Felicia "Snoop" Pearson, Lil' Fizz, Karamo Brown, Michael Arceneaux, Nneka Onuorah, Pastor Delman Coates, Pastor Jamal Bryant, Pastor Kevin Taylor, Ray J, Sharon Lettman-Hicks, Siya
5	S6/SP101	"Love & Hip Hop Atlanta: Joseline's Special Delivery"	May 1, 2017	2.18
This special stars Love & Hip Hop: Atlanta cast member Joseline Hernandez as she prepares for the birth of her daughter, Bonnie Bella. It aired between the eighth and ninth episodes of season six of Love & Hip Hop: Atlanta. Joseline's Special Delivery was produced by Mona Scott-Young and Stephanie R. Gayle for Monami Entertainment, Toby Barraud, Stefan Springman, Mala Chapple and David DiGangi for Eastern TV, and Susan Levison, Nina L. Diaz, Liz Fine and Vivian Gomez for VH1. Joseline Hernandez also serves as co-executive producer. featuring: Joseline Hernandez guest stars: Kermit (Joseline's brother), Nikki Mudarris, Carmen (Joseline's mother), Ceaser Emanuel (Black Ink Crew), Young Dro, Ricco Barrino, Mariahlynn, Momma Dee, Dawn Heflin, Yung Joc, Lovely Mimi, Stevie J
6	S6/SP102	"Love & Hip Hop Atlanta: Dirty Little Secrets 2"	May 10, 2017	1.05
This special, hosted by Mona Scott Young, features unseen footage and deleted scenes from seasons two through five of Love & Hip Hop: Atlanta. It aired between the ninth and tenth episodes of season six of Love & Hip Hop: Atlanta. featuring: Joseline Hernandez, Karlie Redd, Mimi Faust, Momma Dee, Stevie J, Tommie Lee, Yung Joc & Scrappy, Sina Bina, Rasheeda, Ariane Davis, Jessica Dime, Kirk Frost guest stars: Stefan Springman (executive producer), Stephanie Gayle (executive producer), Lashan Browning (executive producer), Daniel Weiner (supervising producer), Shane Abercrombie (director of security), Brian Jones (supervising talent manager)
7	S4/SP101	"Love & Hip Hop Hollywood: Dirty Little Secrets"	July 3, 2017	1.51
This special, hosted by Mona Scott Young, features unseen footage and deleted scenes from the first three seasons of Love & Hip Hop: Hollywood, along with interviews with the show's cast and producers. It aired three weeks before the season four premiere of Love & Hip Hop: Hollywood. featuring: Lil' Fizz, Teairra Mari, Safaree Samuels, Nikki Mudarris & Hazel-E, Princess Love, Ray J, A1 Bentley & Lyrica Anderson, Masika Kalysha, Rich Dollaz, Pam Bentley & Lyrica Garrett, Moniece Slaughter, Miles Brock guest stars: Stephanie Gayle (executive producer), Treiva Williams (co-executive producer), Juhahn Jones (actor), Michael Lang (executive producer), Vivian Payton (co-executive producer)
8	S8/SP101	"Love & Hip Hop New York: Dirty Little Secrets"	October 18, 2017	0.70
This special, hosted by Mona Scott Young, features unseen footage and deleted scenes from the first seven seasons of Love & Hip Hop: New York, along with interviews with the show's cast and producers. It aired two weeks before the season eight premiere of Love & Hip Hop: New York. featuring: Yandy Smith, Kimbella Vanderhee, Rich Dollaz, Somaya Reece, Snoop & DJ Self, Mariahlynn, Tahiry Jose, Erica Mena, Peter Gunz, Papoose & Remy Ma, Jhonni Blaze, Cisco Rosado guest stars: Lauren Veteri (executive producer), Stephanie Gayle (executive producer), Brian Jones (supervising talent manager), Christian Nguyen (director of security), Maricarmen Lopez (co-executive producer)
9	S8/SP102	"Remy & Papoose: A Merry Mackie Holiday"	December 18, 2017	1.23
This holiday special stars Love & Hip Hop: New York cast members Remy Ma and Papoose as they prepare a Christmas party in North Carolina. It aired after the eighth episode of season eight of Love & Hip Hop: New York. Remy & Papoose: A Merry Mackie Holiday executive produced by Mona Scott-Young and Stephanie R. Gayle for Monami Entertainment, Toby Barraud, Stefan Springman, Mala Chapple, Carmen Mitcho and Brian Schornak for Eastern TV, and Nina L. Diaz, Liz Fine and Vivian Gomez for VH1. Remy and Papoose also serve as co-executive producers. featuring: Remy Ma, Papoose guest stars: Remel (Remy's nephew), Tequilla (Remy's cousin), LaToya (Papoose's sister), Irene (Papoose's mother), Baby Dee (Papoose's uncle), Raemonique (Remy's sister), Remeesha (Remy's sister), Amanda (Remy's mother), DJ (Papoose's daughter), Shamele (Papoose's son), Destiney (Papoose's daughter), Aya Shabu (Teaching artist), Jace (Remy's son), Fat Joe (rapper)
10	S8/SP103	"Love & Hip Hop: The Love Edition"	February 12, 2018	1.25
This Valentine's Day special, hosted by Mona Scott-Young, features new interviews with couples from Love & Hip Hop: New York, Atlanta and Hollywood. It aired between the fourteenth and fifteenth episodes of season eight of Love & Hip Hop: New York. featuring: Stevie J, Yung Joc & Karlie Redd, Ray J & Princess Love, Safaree Samuels, Rasheeda & Kirk Frost, Nikki Mudarris, Cisco Rosado, Kimbella Vanderhee, Joseline Hernandez, Moniece Slaughter, Peter Gunz, Lil Scrappy, Jhonni Blaze, Mariahlynn, Papoose & Remy Ma, Snoop & DJ Self, Tahiry Jose, Momma Dee, Miles Brock, Lil' Fizz, Yandy Smith, A1 Bentley & Lyrica Anderson, Rich Dollaz, Mimi Faust guest stars: Stephanie Gayle (executive producer), Gavin Jones (supervising story producer), Trivia Williams (co-executive producer), Michael Lang (executive producer), Brian Jones (supervising talent manager), Maricarmen Lopez (co-executive producer), Mendeecees Harris
11	S5/SP101	"Love & Hip Hop Hollywood: Ray J & Princess' Labor of Love"	September 24, 2018	1.31
This special stars Love & Hip Hop: Hollywood cast members Ray J and Princes Love as their prepare for the birth of their daughter, Melody. It aired after the tenth episode of season five of Love & Hip Hop: Hollywood. Ray J & Princess' Labor of Love was executive produced by Mona Scott-Young and Stephanie R. Gayle for Monami Entertainment, Toby Barraud, Stefan Springman and Carmen Mitcho for Eastern TV, and Nina L. Diaz, Liz Fine and Vivian Gomez for VH1. Ray J, Princess and David Weintraub also serve as co-executive producers. featuring: Ray J, Princess Love guest stars: Dr. Shelley Susman (Princess' doctor), Paniz (interior designer), David Weintraub (Ray J's manager), Spencer Pratt, Too $hort, Eric Cozier (Ray J's friend), Elizabeth Bachner (owner/midwife), Willie Norwood (Ray J's father), Lena Love (Princess' mother), Domonique J. (Princess' best friend), Nia Riley (Princess' friend), Raquel Lemus (childbirth educator), Sonja Norwood cameo: Zellswag, Paris Phillips, Hugh Love
12	S8/SP101	"Love & Hip Hop Awards: Most Certified"	April 1, 2019	0.99
This clip show special, hosted by Tami Roman and DC Young Fly, features Love & Hip Hop franchise cast members from Love & Hip Hop: New York, Atlanta, Hollywood and Miami being awarded in various categories. It aired after the third episode of season eight of Love & Hip Hop: Atlanta. featuring: Karlie Redd, Kirk Frost, Safaree Samuels, Amina Buddafly, Bobby Lytes, Mimi Faust, Shay Johnson, Cardi B, K. Michelle, Momma Dee, Amara La Negra, Moniece Slaughter, Mariahlynn, Tara Wallace, Ray J, Yandy Smith, Yung Joc, A1 Bentley, Remy Ma, Jonathan Fernandez, Mama Jones guest stars: Laiya St. Clair, Kendall Kyndall, Loulou Gonzalez
13a	S8/SP102	"40 Greatest Love & Hip Hop Moments: The Reboot – Part 1"	April 8, 2019	0.80
This 2 hour clip show, hosted by Mona Scott Young, is a countdown of the most "shocking, scandalous and dramatic Love & Hip Hop moments". This first part counts down the 40th to 21st greatest Love & Hip Hop moments, featuring clips from seasons four to eight of Love & Hip Hop: New York, seasons three to seven of Love & Hip Hop: Atlanta, seasons one to five of Love & Hip Hop: Hollywood and the first two seasons of Love & Hip Hop: Miami. It aired after the fourth episode of season eight of Love & Hip Hop: Atlanta. featuring: Ray J, Erica Mena, K. Michelle, Paris Phillips, Safaree Samuels, Mariahlynn, Jonathan Fernandez, Yandy Smith, Remy Ma, Karlie Redd, Misster Ray, Bobby Lytes, Trina, Shay Johnson, Amara La Negra, Yung Joc, A1 Bentley, Moniece Slaughter, Tara Wallace, Momma Dee, Amina Buddafly, Mimi Faust guest stars: Kendall Kyndall, Brian Jones (supervising talent manager), Tami Roman (Petty Betty), Gavin Lee Jones (co-executive producer), Maricarmen Lopez (co-executive producer), Stephanie Gayle (executive producer), Treiva Williams (executive producer)
13b	S8/SP103	"40 Greatest Love & Hip Hop Moments: The Reboot – Part 2"	April 8, 2019	0.80
This second part counts down the 20th to 1st greatest Love & Hip Hop moments, featuring clips from seasons four to eight of Love & Hip Hop: New York, seasons three to seven of Love & Hip Hop: Atlanta, seasons one to five of Love & Hip Hop: Hollywood and the first two seasons of Love & Hip Hop: Miami. It aired after the fourth episode of season eight of Love & Hip Hop: Atlanta. featuring: Ray J, Erica Mena, K. Michelle, Paris Phillips, Safaree Samuels, Mariahlynn, Jonathan Fernandez, Yandy Smith, Remy Ma, Karlie Redd, Misster Ray, Bobby Lytes, Trina, Shay Johnson, Amara La Negra, Yung Joc, A1 Bentley, Moniece Slaughter, Tara Wallace, Momma Dee, Amina Buddafly, Mimi Faust guest stars: Kendall Kyndall, Brian Jones (supervising talent manager), Tami Roman (Petty Betty), Gavin Lee Jones (co-executive producer), Maricarmen Lopez (co-executive producer), Stephanie Gayle (executive producer), Treiva Williams (executive producer)
14a	S1/SP101	"Love & Hip Hop: Secrets Unlocked – Part 1 – Unforgetaways"	January 4, 2021	0.50
This 4 hour reunion special, hosted by Kendall Kyndall, features cast members from Love & Hip Hop: New York, Atlanta, Hollywood and Miami reuniting virtually. It is the first Love & Hip Hop episode after production was shut down due to the COVID-19 pandemic in May 2020 and aired five weeks before the season premiere of Family Reunion. The first hour focuses on the various cast trips throughout the series. Love & Hip Hop: Secrets Unlocked is produced by Mona Scott-Young, Stephanie R. Gayle, Michael Lang and Marta Ravin from Monami Productions. featuring: Cyn Santana & Jonathan Fernandez, Rasheeda & Kirk Frost, Karlie Redd, Yung Joc & Kendra Robinson, Lil Scrappy, Bambi & Momma Dee, Zell Swag & Paris Phillips, Amara La Negra, Bobby Lytes
14b	S1/SP102	"Love & Hip Hop: Secrets Unlocked – Part 2 – Day Ones"	January 11, 2021	0.36
The second part of this reunion special, hosted by Kendall Kyndall, features cast members from Love & Hip Hop: New York, Atlanta, Hollywood and Miami discussing the first appearances of the cast members throughout the series. featuring: Yandy Smith & Mendeecees Harris, Erica Mena & Safaree Samuels, Cyn Santana, Rich Dollaz, Rasheeda & Kirk Frost, Ray J & Princess Love, Amara La Negra, Shay Johnson, Trick Daddy, Sukihana
14c	S1/SP103	"Love & Hip Hop: Secrets Unlocked – Part 3 – Family Fuel"	January 18, 2021	0.37
The third part of this reunion special, hosted by Kendall Kyndall, features cast members from Love & Hip Hop: New York, Atlanta, Hollywood and Miami discussing the various family feuds throughout the series. featuring: Cyn Santana & Jonathan Fernandez, Rasheeda & Kirk Frost, Karlie Redd, Lil Scrappy, Bambi & Momma Dee, Zell Swag & Paris Phillips, Amara La Negra & Mami Ana, Bobby Lytes
14d	S1/SP104	"Love & Hip Hop: Secrets Unlocked – Part 4 – Holy Heartaches"	January 25, 2021	0.39
The final part of this reunion special, hosted by Kendall Kyndall, features cast members from Love & Hip Hop: New York, Atlanta, Hollywood and Miami discussing the various romantic troubles throughout the series. featuring: Yandy Smith & Mendeecees Harris, Erica Mena & Safaree Samuels, Cyn Santana, Rich Dollaz, Rasheeda & Kirk Frost, Yung Joc & Kendra Robinson, Ray J & Princess Love, Amara La Negra, Shay Johnson
15	S1/SP105	"Love & Hip Hop: It's a Love Thing"	February 1, 2021	0.31
This special, hosted by Chris Spencer and Vanessa Rodriguez Spencer, features four couples from Love & Hip Hop: New York, Atlanta and Hollywood, as well as Basketball Wives. It aired a week before the season premiere of Family Reunion. featuring: Remy Ma & Papoose, Yung Joc & Kendra Robinson, Brooke Valentine & Marcus Black, Tami Roman & Reggie Youngblood
16	S10a/SP101	"Love & Hip Hop Atlanta: Inside the A"	June 28, 2021	0.44
This cast and crew of Love & Hip Hop: Atlanta recap the first nine years of the show, hosted by Mona Scott-Young. It aired a week before the season ten premiere of Love & Hip Hop: Atlanta. featuring: Yung Joc, Yandy Smith-Harris, Mimi Faust, Karlie Redd, Erica Dixon, Momma Dee, Lil Scrappy guest stars: Stefan Springman (executive producer), Stephanie Gayle (executive producer), Funky Dineva (celebrity blogger), Danielle Canada (editor, Bossip), Jess Hilarious (comedian), Gavin Lee Jones (co-executive producer), Kendall Kyndall (TV & social media personality), Derek J (celebrity hairstylist), Jasmine Brand (media entrepreneur), Slick Two Three (supervising field producer), Reggie Ray (content creator), Big Freedia (queen of bounce), Tiffany Coleman (producer)
17	S4a/SP101	"Love & Hip Hop Miami: Inside the 305"	August 16, 2021	0.53
This cast and crew of Love & Hip Hop: Miami recap the first three years of the show, hosted by Mona Scott-Young. It aired a week before the season four premiere of Love & Hip Hop: Miami. featuring: Amara La Negra, Trina, Lil Scrappy, Trick Daddy, Shay Johnson, Sukihana, Bobby Lytes, Gunplay guest stars: Stephanie Gayle (executive producer), Pedro Pino (director & camera operator), Danielle Canada (editor, Bossip), Big Freedia (queen of bounce), Maricarmen Lopez (co-executive producer), Jess Hilarious (comedian), Funky Dineva (celebrity blogger), Derek J (celebrity hairstylist), Jasmine Brand (media entrepreneur), James knox (executive producer), Kija Brooks (supervising producer), Tekoa Hash (owner, Teknique Agency), Kendall Kyndall (TV & social media personality)
18a	S2/SP101	"Love & Hip Hop: Lineage to Legacy – Part 1"	February 7, 2022	0.36
Remy Ma, Rich Dollaz, Tokyo Vanity and Paris Phillips explore their African heritage to celebrate Black History Month, hosted by Dometi Pongo. It aired after the ninth episode of season two of Family Reunion. featuring: Remy Ma, Rich Dollaz, Tokyo Vanity, Paris Phillips guest stars: Dr. Gina Paige (co-founder of AfricanAncestry.com), Moshoodat Sanni (stylist), Ceaser Emanuel (Black Ink Crew), Katrina "Kat Tat" Jackson (Black Ink Crew: Chicago), Krystal Kills (Black Ink Crew)
18b	S2/SP102	"Love & Hip Hop: Lineage to Legacy – Part 2"	February 14, 2022	0.26
Karlie Redd, Momma Dee, Papoose and Yandy explore their African heritage to celebrate Black History Month, hosted by Dometi Pongo. It aired after the tenth and final episode of season two of Family Reunion. featuring: Karlie Redd, Momma Dee, Papoose, Yandy Smith guest stars: Dr. Gina Paige (co-founder of AfricanAncestry.com), Moshoodat Sanni (stylist), Ceaser Emanuel (Black Ink Crew), Katrina "Kat Tat" Jackson (Black Ink Crew: Chicago), Krystal Kills (Black Ink Crew)
19a	S10b/SP101	"Love & Hip Hop New York: Where Are They Now?"	October 31, 2022	0.33
Former cast members of Love & Hip Hop: New York recap moments from the show and give an update on their lives, hosted by DJ Self. It aired after the twenty-sixth episode of season ten of Love & Hip Hop: Atlanta. featuring: Mama Jones, Somaya Reece, Lil' Mo, Mariahlynn, Nya Lee, Kiyanne, Bianca Bonnie, DJ Drewski, Sky Landish, Jhonni Blaze, Snoop Pearson, Jen the Pen, Sexxy Lexxy
19b	S10b/SP102	"Love & Hip Hop Hollywood: Where Are They Now?"	November 7, 2022	0.25
Former cast members of Love & Hip Hop: Hollywood recap moments from the show and give an update on their lives, hosted by Ray J. It aired after the twenty-seventh and final episode of season ten of Love & Hip Hop: Atlanta. featuring: Teairra Marí, Fizz, Morgan Hardman, Lyrica Anderson, Nikki Baby, Chanel West Coast, Bridget Kelly, Micky Munday, Hazel-E, RoccStar
19c	S10b/SP103	"Love & Hip Hop Miami: Where Are They Now?"	November 14, 2022	0.25
Former cast members of Love & Hip Hop: Miami recap moments from the show and give an update on their lives, hosted by Trick Daddy. It aired after the season ten reunion of Love & Hip Hop: Atlanta. featuring: Brisco, Chinese Kitty, Gunplay, Hood Brat, Keyara Stone, Khaotic, Malik Williams, Miami Tip, Michelle Pooch, Nikki Natural, Young Hollywood
19d	S10b/SP104	"Love & Hip Hop Atlanta: Where Are They Now?"	November 21, 2022	0.25
Former cast members of Love & Hip Hop: Atlanta recap moments from the show and give an update on their lives, hosted by Yung Joc. It aired after the season ten reunion of Love & Hip Hop: Atlanta. featuring: Akbar V, Althea Heart, Ariane Davis, Dawn Heflin, DJ Babey Drew, Traci Steele, Erica Dixon, Kalenna Harper, Karen King, Lovely Mimi, Shooter Gates, Tony Vick
