= Love & Hip Hop: Atlanta season 6 =

Love & Hip Hop: Atlanta
- Season 6
- Cover used by the iTunes Store
- Starring: Mimi Faust; Rasheeda; Karlie Redd; Tammy Rivera; Tommie Lee; Joseline Hernandez; Stevie J
- No. of episodes: 18

Release
- Original network: VH1
- Original release: March 6 – July 17, 2017

Season chronology
- ← Previous; Season 5 Next → Season 7

The sixth season of the reality television series Love & Hip Hop: Atlanta aired on VH1 from March 6, 2017 until July 17, 2017. The season was primarily filmed in Atlanta, Georgia. It is executively produced by Mona Scott-Young and Stephanie R. Gayle for Monami Entertainment, Toby Barraud, Stefan Springman, Mala Chapple, David DiGangi, Lashan Browning and Donna Edge-Rachell for Eastern TV, and Nina L. Diaz, Liz Fine and Vivian Gomez for VH1.

The series chronicles the lives of several women and men in the Atlanta area, involved in hip hop music. It consists of 18 episodes, including a two-part reunion special hosted by Nina Parker.

== Production ==
The cast of the sixth season, from left to right: Tommie, Rasheeda, Mimi, Stevie J, Joseline, Tammy and Karlie.

The sixth season title screen.

On February 21, 2017, VH1 announced Love & Hip Hop: Atlanta would be returning for a sixth season on March 6, 2017. A 5-minute long "super-trailer" was released on February 27, 2017. With the exception of K. Michelle, despite persistent rumors of a mass firing, all main cast members from the previous season returned, along with Tommie Lee, who was promoted to the main cast. Social media personality Lovely Mimi joined the supporting cast, along with club promoter Melissa Scott, Kirk's alleged mistress Jasmine Washington, her lovers Rod Bullock and Keanna Arnold, beauty shop owner Sierra Gates, her assistant Moriah Lee and her husband Shooter Gates. Although not included in the initial cast announcement, aspiring radio personality Tresure Price, aspiring singer Estelita Quintero, Stevie J's daughter Savannah Jordan and Tommie's mother Samantha would also appear in supporting roles. Rapper Gunplay appeared as a supporting cast member for one episode, his appearance serving as a teaser for the then upcoming spin-off Love & Hip Hop: Miami.

On April 19, 2017, VH1 announced that Joseline's Special Delivery, a special documenting the birth of Joseline's child, will air between the season's eighth and ninth episodes on May 1, 2017. It premiered to 2.18 million viewers. Additionally, Dirty Little Secrets 2, a special featuring unseen footage and deleted scenes from the show's second season up until season five, aired on May 10, 2017 to over 1 million viewers.

Production on the season became increasingly troubled, with later episodes showing scenes of Joseline Hernandez and Kirk Frost breaking the fourth wall to express their displeasure with the producers. Long time cast members Bambi Benson, Ariane Davis and Deb Antney had their screen time reduced dramatically while Dawn Heflin was phased out of the show nearly entirely (having only two minor guest appearances). On January 27, 2017, Bambi was hospitalized during filming, and later confirmed to have quit the show due to her drama with Scrappy. Behind the scenes during the reunion taping on June 1, 2017, tensions between Joseline, Mona Scott-Young and the other producers exploded, with Joseline announcing that she had quit the show after six seasons.

With this season, Love & Hip Hop: Atlanta became the first incarnation of the franchise to reach 100 episodes.

== Synopsis ==
The season opens with a heavily pregnant Joseline at war with Stevie over the paternity of her child. Karlie and Yung Joc have rekindled their romance, however she finds it difficult to forget his past treatment of her. Tammy has left Waka; while she's focused of being single and independent, he makes big attempts to win her back and fight for their family. Tommie is dealing with the legal repercussions of her violent feud with Joseline last year. At Joseline's masquerade-themed party, Karlie and Joc are shocked when they approached by a woman named Jasmine, who claims the father of her baby born a few months ago is Kirk and him and Rasheeda face the major challenges heading towards their marriage.

=== Reception ===
The series premiere garnered big ratings for the network, with VH1 announcing a combined rating of 5.2 million viewers, up 17% from its fifth season bow. However, ratings soon decreased and the show began receiving criticism for its focus on the new cast members and their little-to-no connection with the hip hop music industry, as well as their allegedly fabricated storylines. Funky Dineva, who has recapped the show for six years and appeared in early episodes of the show, slammed the storyline involving Sierra and Moriah as "phony and fake" and said executive producer Mona Scott-Young "should be ashamed" to put her name on "this garbage ass, fake ass, bullshit ass show".

== Cast ==
=== Starring ===
- Mimi Faust (13 episodes)
- Rasheeda (15 episodes)
- Karlie Redd (16 episodes)
- Tammy Rivera (15 episodes)
- Tommie Lee (13 episodes)
- Joseline Hernandez (14 episodes)
- Stevie J (15 episodes)

=== Also starring ===
- Yung Joc (16 episodes)
- Melissa Scott (13 episodes)
- Jasmine Washington (8 episodes)
- Kirk Frost (12 episodes)
- Rod Bullock (5 episodes)
- Momma Dee (8 episodes)
- Ernest Bryant (6 episodes)
- Lil Scrappy (9 episodes)
- Karen King (7 episodes)
- Waka Flocka Flame (5 episodes)
- Jessica Dime (15 episodes)
- Keanna Arnold (4 episodes)
- Bambi Benson (3 episodes)
- Sierra Gates (8 episodes)
- Moriah Lee (7 episodes)
- Lovely Mimi (10 episodes)
- Tresure P (9 episodes)
- Shooter Gates (4 episodes)
- Deb Antney (3 episodes)
- Ariane Davis (5 episodes)
- Gunplay (1 episode)
- Shirleen Harvell (7 episodes)
- Estelita Quintero (7 episodes)
- Savannah Jordan (6 episodes)
- Samantha Lee (6 episodes)

Stevie J's daughter Sade Jordan, Shawne Williams, Black Ink Crew's Ceaser Emmanuel and Jasmine's ex-boyfriend Logan Bullard would appear as guest stars in several episodes. The show features minor appearances from notable figures within the hip hop industry and Atlanta's social scene, including Young Dro, Ernest's mother Bessie Bryant, Alexis Skyy, Jasmine Burke, Bobby V, Stevie J's son Dorian Jordan, Sina Bina, Dawn Heflin, Joseline's brother Kermit Silva, Stevie J and Mimi's daughter Eva Jordan, Kandi Burruss, Spice, Kelsie Frost, Ky Frost and Stevie Jordan Jr.

== Episodes ==
No. overall	No. in season	Title	Original release date	US viewers (millions)
87	1	"Who's Your Daddy"	March 6, 2017	3.21
Joseline and Stevie struggle over the paternity of her unborn child. Tommie faces legal problems because of her ongoing beef with Joseline. Karlie and Joc rekindle their old flame with one another. When a mysterious stranger drops a bomb, Kirk and Rasheeda's marriage is placed in serious jeopardy. Tommie is added to the opening credits, replacing departing cast member K. Michelle. Melissa and Jasmine join the supporting cast.
88	2	"Family Matters"	March 13, 2017	3.08
The Frosts, Jasmine and her boyfriend Rod deal with the consequences of Jasmine's bomb drop. Joseline and Stevie sit face to face for the first time in months and Joseline leaves the meeting with shocking news for her friend Melissa. Momma Dee and Ernest deal with marital issues. Tommie's out of jail, and meeting up with her real mom Samantha, and her surrogate mom, KK. Stevie gets a visit from a surprise guest. Rod joins the supporting cast. Although credited, Mimi and Tammy do not appear.
89	3	"Sister Wives"	March 20, 2017	2.73
Rasheeda deals with Kirk's infidelity. Rod and Jasmine's unconventional relationship is revealed. Waka tries to make things right with Tammy. Tommie clashes with Karlie. Joseline attempts to resolve her paternity issues. Keanna joins the supporting cast.
90	4	"In with the New"	March 27, 2017	3.08
Tommie is mixing it up with new friends and a potential new man. The end may be near for Scrappy and Bambi. Karlie finds out some shocking details about Jasmine, which prompts Joc to reveal a big secret. Sierra, Moriah, Lovely Mimi and Tresure join the supporting cast. Although credited, Mimi, Rasheeda, Tammy, Joseline and Stevie do not appear.
91	5	"War and Peace"	April 3, 2017	2.78
Joseline wants to gather friends and asks for Melissa's help. Joc and Karlie go on explosive double dates. Tresure and Tommie face off. Kirk continues to deal with the fallout of his infidelity. Moriah's married man is revealed. Shooter joins the supporting cast. Although credited, Mimi does not appear.
92	6	"Frenemies"	April 10, 2017	2.90
Joc confronts his ex Sina about her relationship with Rod. Joseline rekindles an old friendship. Stevie goes to great lengths to bring his family together. Although credited, Mimi, Karlie, Rasheeda, Tammy, and Tommie do not appear.
93	7	"Grapes of Wrath"	April 17, 2017	3.14
Tommie's new business venture has people wondering if she's making good decisions. Joseline and Stevie face off in court, right before the paternity test results come in. When Dime reveals she and Joseline have reconciled, her friendships with the other ladies are put to the test. Waka plots to fix his marriage. Sierra confronts Moriah.
94	8	"In Due Time"	April 24, 2017	2.92
Tommie's wine tasting brings drama and a surprise guest. Scrappy holds Kirk to the fire on the paternity of baby Kannon. Karlie finds out some truths about Joc. Joseline prepares for the birth of Bonnie. Mimi confronts Melissa.
95	9	"Bachelor Bash"	May 8, 2017	2.50
Stevie adjusts to being a new dad. Scrappy throws a party to celebrate his return to single life. Momma Dee and Shirleen team up to pry into Kirk's affairs. Waka makes a grand romantic gesture to win Tammy back. Gunplay joins the supporting cast, although he would only appear in this episode. Although credited, Mimi, Tommie and Joseline do not appear.
96	10	"Up in Flames"	May 15, 2017	2.29
Joseline is back in action after the birth of Bonnie Bella. Rasheeda confronts her mother about Scrappy's party. KK convinces Tommie and her mother to give their relationship another try. Joseline and Karlie come face to face.
97	11	"Keep It Real"	May 22, 2017	2.51
Karlie and Joseline come to an understanding. Joseline goes to LA to co-host The Real. Karlie seeks revenge against Joc. Dime reveals a secret about her love life. Stevie has a shocking proposal for Joseline. Estelita joins the supporting cast. Tamera Mowry, Jeannie Mai, Loni Love and Adrienne Bailon appear in archival footage of Joseline's appearance on The Real.
98	12	"Jamaican Flavor"	June 5, 2017	2.67
Waka moves back into the house but is surprised by Tammy's independence. Rasheeda is shocked by a surprise visitor who has news about Jasmine's baby and seeks advice from a special friend. The guys plot against the girls. And the girls' trip to Jamaica gets off to a rocky start with uninvited crashers. Although credited, Tommie, Joseline and Stevie do not appear.
99	13	"Jamaican Me Crazy"	June 12, 2017	2.60
Kirk and Rasheeda finally talk. Dime gets the romantic surprise of a lifetime. Back in Atlanta, Jasmine gets an unwanted visit from her pesky ex-boyfriend. Joseline reconsiders working things out with Stevie. Although credited, Tommie and Stevie do not appear.
100	14	"Reality Bites"	June 19, 2017	2.69
A phone call from home brings the Jamaica trip to an abrupt end. Rod checks Logan, but has questions for Jasmine. Joseline has a surprise proposal for Stevie. Karlie takes one relationship to the next level and destroys another. Although credited, Rasheeda and Tommie do not appear.
101	15	"When All Else Fails"	June 26, 2017	2.50
Stevie deals with the fallout from Joseline's botched apology to his daughters. Tommie and Dime agree to sit down to hash out their differences. Jasmine takes Kannon to get his DNA test. Kirk surprises Rasheeda on a cabin getaway. Savannah joins the supporting cast. Although credited, Karlie and Joseline do not appear.
102	16	"The End Is Near"	July 3, 2017	2.34
Kirk reaches his breaking point. Rasheeda is rocked by DNA test results. Tommie and Samantha try to deal with their issues. Joseline wants Stevie to join her in New York and fire Estelita. Stevie makes a difficult decision. Samantha joins the supporting cast. Wendy Williams appears in archival footage from her show, discussing Joseline and Stevie's cancelled appearance.
103	17	"Reunion – Part 1"	July 10, 2017	2.71
This cast reunites as host Nina Parker dives into all of the drama from the season. The question of whether Joseline will confront her fellow cast members lingers in the air. Some truths are revealed when Tommie and Stevie spill some tea. Things get heated as Lovely Mimi and Karlie exchange words. We get into messiness of the glam shop, but nothing compares to the amount of tears shed onstage for Rasheeda and Kirk. host: Nina Parker
104	18	"Reunion – Part 2"	July 17, 2017	2.73
The drama continues with Joseline backstage. Things with KK and Tommie get heated after their social media fiasco. The cast discusses its Jamaican trip and what really happened with Karlie and Joc. host: Nina Parker

== Music ==
Several cast members had their music featured on the show and released singles to coincide with the airing of the episodes.

List of songs performed and/or featured in Love & Hip Hop: Atlanta season six
Title	Performer	Album	Episode(s)	Notes	Ref
Pop Dat (feat. Young Dro)	Joseline Hernandez	single	1	played at release party	
In That Order (feat. Yung Joc)	Momma Dee	single	2	performed in street party	
Baby Daddy	Joseline Hernandez	single	6	performed at music video shoot	
Movin' & Groovin' (feat. Polo 2G)	Yung Joc	single	7	performed onstage	
Bible on the Dash, Pt. 2	Gunplay (as Don Logan)	single	9	performed in studio and onstage	
Bachelor (feat. Bobby V)	Lil Scrappy	single	9	performed onstage	
All These Kisses	Tammy Rivera	Fate	12	played in scene	
Sheet	Spice	single	12	performed onstage	
Big Dawg	Waka Flocka Flame	single	13	performed onstage	
I'll Still Say Down	Tammy Rivera	single	13	played in scene	
One Way	Jessica Dime	single	14	performed onstage	
