= Love & Hip Hop: Atlanta season 8 =

Love & Hip Hop: Atlanta
- Season 8
- Cover used by the iTunes Store
- Starring: Rasheeda; Mimi Faust; Karlie Redd; Spice; Scrapp DeLeon; Yung Joc; Stevie J
- No. of episodes: 20

Release
- Original network: VH1
- Original release: March 25 – July 29, 2019

Season chronology
- ← Previous; Season 7 Next → Season 9

The eighth season of the reality television series Love & Hip Hop: Atlanta aired on VH1 from March 25, 2019, until July 29, 2019. The season was primarily filmed in Atlanta, Georgia. It is executively produced by Mona Scott-Young and Stephanie R. Gayle for Monami Entertainment, Toby Barraud, Stefan Springman, David DiGangi, Jamail Shelton, Brian Schornak and Richard Allen for Eastern TV, and Nina L. Diaz and Vivian Gomez for VH1.

The series chronicles the lives of several women and men in the Atlanta area, involved in hip-hop music. It consists of 20 episodes, including a two-part reunion special hosted by Nina Parker.

== Production ==
Season eight of Love & Hip Hop: Atlanta began filming in October 2018. Months earlier, on July 18, 2018, it was reported that Stevie J and Faith Evans had married in Las Vegas. On October 18, 2018, Tommie was arrested for allegedly attacking her daughter at her high school while heavily intoxicated. On January 3, 2019, while facing up to 54 years behind bars for the crime, Tommie confirmed that she would not be returning to the show. Erica Mena would also not return as a series regular, although she denied she had been fired and would later appear as a commentator for the special 40 Greatest Love & Hip Hop Moments: The Reboot, which would air during the season.

On February 25, 2019, VH1 announced Love & Hip Hop: Atlanta would be returning for an eighth season on March 25, 2019. On March 4, 2019, VH1 released a promo confirming that Spice, Scrapp DeLeon and Yung Joc had been promoted to the main cast, after appearing in previous seasons as supporting cast members. T.I. & Tiny: The Family Hustle's Shekinah Anderson, rapper Akbar V, socialite Pooh Hicks, Che Mack, Joc's fiancé Kendra Robinson and Love & Hip Hop: Hollywood's Moniece Slaughter would join the supporting cast, while Stevie J's new wife Faith Evans would make guest appearances. Bambi's mother Cece and salon owner Sharonda Official would also appear in minor supporting roles. On March 12, 2019, Stevie J tweeted "Not returning for a full season. No need". Subsequently, he appeared infrequently during the season, despite being credited as a cast member in every episode.

On March 6, 2019, VH1 began releasing a series of cast interviews with Rasheeda, Mimi, Karlie, Spice, Stevie J, Kirk and Tokyo Vanity. On March 16, 2019, VH1 released a sneak peek of the season's premiere episode. On March 18, 2019, VH1 released a 5-minute super trailer.

On April 1, 2019, VH1 aired Love & Hip Hop Awards: Most Certified, a special hosted by Tami Roman and D.C. Young Fly and featuring Love & Hip Hop franchise cast members being awarded in various categories. The show would feature appearances from current and former Atlanta cast members Mimi, Karlie, K. Michelle, Kirk, Momma Dee, Shay Johnson, Yung Joc and Moniece, as well as Love & Hip Hop: New York's Cardi B, Amina Buddafly, Tara Wallace, Mariahlynn, Yandy Smith, Remy Ma, Jonathan Fernandez and Mama Jones, Hollywood's Safaree Samuels, Ray J and A1 Bentley, and Miami's Bobby Lytes and Amara La Negra. On April 8, 2019, VH1 aired another clip show special, 40 Greatest Love & Hip Hop Moments: The Reboot, which would again feature appearances from the aforementioned cast members, as well as Erica Mena, Love & Hip Hop: Hollywood's Paris Phillips and Misster Ray, and Miami's Trina.

== Cast ==
=== Starring ===
- Rasheeda (18 episodes)
- Mimi Faust (16 episodes)
- Karlie Redd (18 episodes)
- Spice (12 episodes)
- Scrapp DeLeon (15 episodes)
- Yung Joc (17 episodes)
- Stevie J (8 episodes)

=== Also starring ===
- Tokyo Vanity (15 episodes)
- Momma Dee (11 episodes)
- Karen King (8 episodes)
- Sierra Gates (16 episodes)
- Kirk Frost (15 episodes)
- Pooh Hicks (13 episodes)
- Tiarra Becca (4 episodes)
- Che Mack (11 episodes)
- Lil Scrappy (15 episodes)
- Moniece Slaughter (6 episodes)
- Bambi Benson (12 episodes)
- Shekinah Anderson (18 episodes)
- Akbar V (14 episodes)
- Cee Cee (3 episodes)
- Jasmine Washington (2 episodes)
- Kendra Robinson (14 episodes)
- Erica Dixon (9 episodes)
- BK Brasco (6 episodes)
- Kelsie Frost (4 episodes)
- Sharonda Official (3 episodes)
- Sina Bina (3 episodes)

Tommie Lee returns briefly in unseen archival footage in the season premiere. Faith Evans, Eva Jordan, Sas, Arkansas Mo, Made Man, Mingnon Dixon, Hiriam Hicks, Ty Young and Shirleen Harvell appear as guest stars in several episodes. The show features minor appearances from notable figures within the hip hop industry and Atlanta's social scene, including Kandi Burruss, Pastor Jamal Bryant, Machel Montano, Destra Garcia and Dr. Jeff.

== Episodes ==
No. overall	No. in season	Title	Original release date	US viewers (millions)
123	1	"A New Dawn"	March 25, 2019	1.99
Spice considers skin bleaching to help her career. Mimi is the victim of an armed robbery, bringing Stevie J back to Atlanta with his new wife, Faith Evans. Scrapp comes home after a three year stint in jail. guest stars: Faith Evans, Amber Renick (hair stylist), Jevon Dewand (artist manager and developer), Erica, Eva (Stevie J's daughter), Cheyenne (Scrapp's sister), Sas, Dr. Taliaferro (dermatologist) cameo: Tommie Lee Spice, Scrapp Deleon, and Joc are added to the opening credits, replacing departing cast members Jessica, Tommie, and Erica Mena. Although credited, Joc does not appear.
124	2	"Unfriended"	March 25, 2019	2.09
Scrapp is reunited with his estranged father. Mimi demands a sit down with Stevie and Faith. Rasheeda meets Kirk's son. Pooh confronts Karlie after being left off the guest list of her engagement party. guest stars: Shekinah, Sas, Big Will (Scrapp's father), Arkansas Mo, Donna (Spice's friend), Sade (Spice's friend), Erica, Faith Evans, Kannon (Kirk's son), Kelsie Frost, Kirk Jr. Pooh joins the supporting cast. Although credited, Joc does not appear.
125	3	"On the Plus Side"	April 1, 2019	1.64
Moniece arrives in Atlanta, ready to start a relationship with Scrapp. Akbar escapes the hood and shares an emotional moment with her son. Momma Dee kicks Bambi's mother Cece out of her "palace" and into a Motel 6. Tokyo and Sierra come to blows over her weight. guest stars: Mr. Two Weeks Out (trainer), Kandi Burruss (Akbar V's cousin), Dorribion (Akbar V's son) Che Mack, Moniece, Shekinah, Akbar V and Cee Cee join the supporting cast. Although credited, Rasheeda, Mimi, Karlie, Spice, Joc and Stevie J do not appear.
126	4	"Case of the Ex"	April 8, 2019	1.54
Karlie invites Joc to her engagement party, provoking mixed reactions from their significant others. Scrappy and Bambi try to mend things between Momma Dee and Cece. Tiarra has a meltdown after Scrapp admits that he is dating Moniece. guest stars: Dr. Dourran (OB/GYN), Kendra, Arkansas Mo cameo: Cheyenne, Sas Although credited, Rasheeda, Mimi, Spice and Stevie J do not appear.
127	5	"The Skin You're In"	April 15, 2019	1.52
Tokyo continues to clash with Sierra over her weight. Che Mack wants to get her career back on track. Kirk confronts Jasmine about her parenting. Bambi gives birth. Mimi tries to educate Spice about American civil rights history, but it backfires. guest stars: Ace (personal trainer), Made Man, Yvette Washington (Jasmine's mom), Gloria Johnson (Jasmine's grandmother) Although credited, Karlie, Scrapp DeLeon and Stevie J do not appear.
128	6	"One for the Ages"	April 22, 2019	1.55
Leading up to Karlie's engagement party, Pooh and Che Mack plan to expose old secrets. Scrapp catches up with Tiarra. Joc struggles with telling Kendra the truth. Spice's new appearance causes chaos on social media and in real life. guest stars: Cheyenne (Scrapp's sister), Dr. Robert Dourron, Arkansas Mo, Sas (Scrapp's brother), Donta (Scrapp's brother), Erica Kendra joins the supporting cast. Although credited, Stevie J does not appear.
129	7	"The Immaculate Conception"	April 29, 2019	1.62
Karlie gets news from her doctor and Arkansas Mo. Moniece confronts Scrapp about a video involving him and his ex. Erica makes a surprising revelation. Tokyo and Shekinah talk to Che about her actions at Karlie's engagement party. Akbar deals with an injury. guest stars: Arkansas Mo, BK Brasco, Mingnon (Erica Dixon's mother), Emani (Erica Dixon's daughter) Although credited, Spice and Stevie J do not appear.
130	8	"Cabin Confessions"	May 6, 2019	1.58
Secrets and lies are unraveled at Kirk and Rasheeda's couples' retreat. Karlie squares off with an unexpected visitor. Surprising revelations derails Sierra and BK's relationship. Back in the A, Moniece's collab with Akbar goes all the way left. guest stars: Profet (Akbar V's friend), Arkansas Mo Although credited, Mimi, Spice, Scrapp DeLeon and Stevie J do not appear.
131	9	"You Flew Here, I Grew Here"	May 13, 2019	1.48
Tokyo and Akbar bump heads at their showcase. Karlie targets Kendra and Bambi as her messiness spirals out of control. Erica tries to make amends with Scrappy. Pooh hosts a cocktail party that goes left. guest stars: Mingnon (Erica's mom), Arkansas Mo, Lil Bankhead Although credited, Scrapp DeLeon and Stevie J do not appear.
132	10	"To the Left"	May 20, 2019	1.45
Spice invites everyone to Trinidad. Sierra attempts to make things right between Tokyo and Akbar. Pooh tries clear name after all of the drama. Scrapp DeLeon helps to put on a charity event. Shekinah helps out Che. guest stars: Sas, Pastor Jamal Bryant, Made Man, Arkansas Mo, Hiriam Hicks (music industry mogul) Although credited, Stevie J does not appear.
133	11	"Excess Baggage"	May 27, 2019	1.45
Everyone arrives in Trinidad. Karlie has issues with Tokyo and Shekinah. Joc, Kirk, and Scrappy venture in to the jungle. A vengeful Pooh comes and tells Karlie's business. Akbar and Scrapp help Che through a hard time. Although credited, Spice and Stevie J do not appear.
134	12	"Up All Night"	June 3, 2019	1.50
Issues arise between Joc and Kendra at an all-night rave in Trinidad. Karlie introduces everyone to her family. Pooh has shocking receipts. In Atlanta, Stevie talks to Scrapp for the first since he went to prison. guest stars: Hiriam Hicks (music industry mogul) Although credited, Spice does not appear.
135	13	"Spice World"	June 10, 2019	1.47
Spice arrives in Trinidad to perform at Machel Monday. Rasheeda has new issues with Kirk after learning his secret. Pooh tries to settle the beef with Karlie for the last time. Akbar and Sierra's friendship goes downhill. guest stars: Machel Montano (Trinidadian singer), Destra Garcia (Trinidadian singer), Made Man Although credited, Scrapp DeLeon and Stevie J do not appear.
136	14	"Redd Flags"	June 17, 2019	1.52
Karlie and Mo try to work out their issues in therapy. Joc enlists Shekinah to help with issues in his salon. Rasheeda has a conversation with Jasmine. BK has a heated exchange with Sierra. guest stars: Sharonda (salon manager), Arkansas Mo, Dr. Jeff Gardere (psychologist) cameo: Eva Although credited, Spice does not appear.
137	15	"Questions and Answers"	June 24, 2019	1.65
Drama erupts at Kirk and Rasheeda's seminar. Ty questions Mimi's relationship with Stevie. The mothers of Joc's children weigh in on Kendra. Pooh and Akbar link up to take down Shekinah. Scrapp debates his next move with Sierra. guest stars: Ty, Alex (Joc's ex-wife), Sina (Joc's ex-girlfriend), Hiriam Hicks (music industry mogul)
138	16	"Do Not Engage"	July 1, 2019	1.51
Kendra finds out about the salacious rumors about Joc. A controversial comment sparks a heated argument between Spice and Shekinah. Tokyo is M.I.A.. Scrapp tries to break the cycle. Akbar finds common ground. guest stars: Emani (Erica and Scrappy's daughter), Papi (Scrapp's son), King (Scrapp and Tiarra's son), Alex (Joc's ex-wife), Mingnon (Erica Dixon's mother), Sas, Cheyenne Sharonda joins the supporting cast. Although credited, Stevie J does not appear.
139	17	"Put It on Your Mama"	July 8, 2019	1.75
Karlie and her daughter bump heads with Pooh and her daughter at Rasheeda's event. Joc gets in more trouble with Kendra. Scrappy struggles after a family get-together goes wrong. Tokyo talks to her mom about her personal struggles. Joc confronts Karlie, Sina and Sharonda. guest stars: Kellie, Shirleen, Heleniece (Tokyo's mom), Emani (Erica's daughter), Jasmine (Karlie's daughter), Najee (Pooh's daughter), Mingnon (Erica's mom), Jasmine Brown (Momma Dee's daughter) Although credited, Mimi, Spice, Scrapp DeLeon and Stevie J do not appear.
140	18	"Winner Take All"	July 15, 2019	1.60
Mimi, Ty, Stevie and Faith sit down to squash the beef between Ty and Stevie. Scrappy deals with unresolved issues from his car accident. Pooh confronts Sierra at Spice and Akbar’s session. Joc proposes to Kendra. guest stars: Ty, Casino (Scrappy's friend), Salam (Scrapp's friend), Shirleen, Faith Evans cameo: Eva, Emani, Sas
141	19	"Reunion – Part 1"	July 22, 2019	1.74
As Nina Parker dives into messy sheet moments from season eight, Pooh becomes the center of attention when the cast discuss on whether or not Karlie had slept with her and Hiram. Sierra digs up dirt on Pooh, provoking a messy confrontation. Scrappy and Erica face off, while Stevie works on settling the beef with Ty. Karlie takes another lie detector test to put all the rumors to rest once and for all. host: Nina Parker guest stars: Ty
142	20	"Reunion – Part 2"	July 29, 2019	1.90
Karlie's test results are revealed. The cast dishes into Scrapp DeLeon's release and his relationship status with Moniece. Akbar gets to the bottom of her issues with Shekinah. Tokyo opens up about her battle with depression. host: Nina Parker

== Webisodes ==
=== Check Yourself ===
Love & Hip Hop Atlanta: Check Yourself, which features the cast's reactions to each episode, was released weekly with every episode on digital platforms.

List of Love & Hip Hop Atlanta: Check Yourself Season 8 episodes

Episode	Title	Featured cast members	Ref
1	"Meeting White Spice & Momma Dee's Risque Performance"	Karlie, Joc, Scrappy, Tokyo, Karen King	
2	"Uninvited and Unfriended"	Tokyo, Shekinah, Pooh, Karlie	
3	"Things Are Not Working Out"	Joc, Scrappy, Shekinah, Karen King, Karlie, Tokyo	
4	"Mama Drama Meets Baby Mama Drama"	Joc, Scrappy, Shekinah, Karen King, Akbar V, Scrapp DeLeon, Tiarra	
5	"Yung Joc Comes Clean & Kirk Faces His Baby Mama's Mama"	Shekinah, Joc, Karlie	
6	"Karlie's Explosive Engagement Party"	Che Mack, Pooh, Karlie, Joc	
7	"Pooh's Offer, Karlie's Relationship Drama & Che Mack's Apology"	Pooh, Che Mack, Karlie	
8	"Karlie Gets Messy at the Couples' Retreat"	Pooh, Sierra, Joc	
9	"Akbar V Doesn't Want to Make Nice & Karlie Provokes"	Akbar V, Pooh, Karlie	
10	"Pooh's Unexpected Appearance & Akbar V's Fight with Spice"	Sierra, Pooh, Shekinah, Akbar V	
11	"The Guys Explore the Jungle & Pooh Crashes the Vacation"	Shekinah, Karlie, Pooh	
12	"Settling Sexcapades & Getting Lit in Trinidad"	Shekinah, Karlie, Pooh, Joc, Scrappy	
13	"Che Gives Sierra Advice & Rasheeda Loses Her Cool"	Karlie, Joc, Scrappy, Shekinah	
14	"The Guys Celebrate Scrapp's Freedom & BK Confronts Sierra"	Joc, Scrappy, Shekinah, Pooh, Karlie	
15	"Mimi Tells Pooh to Cool It & Joc Interviews Salon Managers"	Karlie, Joc, Scrappy, Shekinah	
16	"Joc's Exes Spill the Tea & Kendra Casts Blame for the Fire"	Joc, Scrappy, Shekinah, Karlie, Pooh	
17	"Karlie and Pooh's Daughters Face Off & Joc Wants Answers"	Shekinah, Scrappy, Joc, Pooh, Karlie	
18	"Popping the Question & Settling a Score"	Joc, Scrappy, Pooh, Shekinah, Karlie	

=== Bonus scenes ===
Deleted scenes from the season's episodes were released weekly as bonus content on VH1's official website.

List of Love & Hip Hop: Atlanta Season 8 bonus scenes

Episode	Title	Featured cast members	Ref
1	"It's Not Her Problem Anymore"	Mimi, Erica	
1	"Mimi Agrees to Be Karlie's Wedding Planner"	Mimi, Karlie	
2	"Karlie's Engagement Gift"	Karlie, Arkansas Mo	
2	"Pooh Welcomes Her Man Home"	Pooh	
3	"Family Time with Akbar V"	Akbar V, Sierra	
3	"Dueling Matriarchs" (Extended scene)	Momma Dee, Cece, Scrappy, Bambi	
4	"Momma Dee Will Not Hear Anyone's Negativity"	Momma Dee, Joc	
4	"Scrappy Gets Real with Momma Dee"	Momma Dee, Scrappy	
5	"Is Jasmine Taking Parenting Seriously"	Rasheeda, Mimi, Kirk	
5	"Rasheeda and Kirk Get Down to Business"	Rasheeda, Kirk	
6	"Could Yung Joc Finally Be Getting Married?"	Scrappy, Joc, Bambi	
6	"Che Mack Welcomes Herself to the Moms' Club" (Extended scene)	Mimi, Rasheeda, Erica, Che Mack	
7	"Akbar V Spills Scrapp's Relationship Status" (Extended scene)	Akbar V, Tiarra	
7	"A Toast to Peace" (Extended scene)	Mimi, Rasheeda, Momma Dee, Mingnon	
8	"Shekinah and Karlie Hash It Out" (Extended scene)	Shekinah, Karlie, Joc, Kendra, Kirk, Rasheeda, Bambi, Scrappy, Sierra, BK Brasco	
8	"Karlie Opens Up to the Ladies"	Karlie, Rasheeda, Sierra, Shekinah	
9	"Pooh Lets Karlie Get the Best of Her" (Extended scene)	Pooh, Karlie, Mimi	
9	"Akbar V Is Gunning to Be the Queen of Atlanta"	Akbar V	
10	"Akbar V and Sas Encourage Each Other" (Extended scene)	Akbar V, Sas	
10	"Joc's Salon Gets Heated"	Joc, Mimi, Rasheeda	
11	"Scrappy Gets Stuck in the Cuddle Zone"	Scrappy, Bambi	
11	"Scrapp Wants a Down-to-Earth Girl" (Extended scene)	Scrapp DeLeon, Che Mack	
12	"Kendra Has Hang-Ups About Having Kids with Yung Joc" (Extended scene)	Kendra, Bambi	
12	"Sharing a Piece of the American Dream" (Extended scene)	Kirk, Scrappy, Joc, Kendra	
13	"Made Man Has a Major Wake-Up Call"	Che Mack, Made Man	
13	"Kirk Handles the Catch of the Day & Shekinah Leads a Meditation" (Extended scene)	Kirk, Rasheeda, Karlie, Mimi, Shekinah, Tokyo Vanity	
14	"Rasheeda Vents About Jasmine"	Rasheeda, Kirk	
14	"The Sex CEO" (Extended scene)	Karlie, Mimi, Sierra	
15	"The Shekinah Jo and Sierra Show"	Shekinah, Sierra	
15	"It's Called Hustling" (Extended scene)	Joc	
16	"Is Kendra's Relationship Distracting Her from Work?"	Kendra	
16	"Shekinah Denies Having Beef with Akbar V"	Shekinah, Sierra, Erica	
17	"Tokyo Spends Time With Her Mom"	Tokyo	
17	"Momma Dee and Mignon Offer Emani an Apology"	Momma Dee, Mignon, Emani	
18	"Why Does Everyone Have Beef with Karlie?"	Pooh, Che Mack	
18	"Karlie Uses Her Investigative Skill on Herself"	Karlie, Spice, Shekinah, Sierra	

== Music ==
Several cast members had their music featured on the show and released singles to coincide with the airing of the episodes.

List of songs performed and/or featured in Love & Hip Hop: Atlanta season eight
Title	Performer	Album	Episode(s)	Notes	Ref
Black Hypocrisy	Spice	Captured	2	performed in studio session	
Griselda Blanco	Akbar V	Griselda Blanco	11	performed in studio session	
