= Family Reunion: Love & Hip Hop Edition =

- Genre: Reality
- Opening theme: "Family Affair"
- Composer: Mary J. Blige
- Country of origin: United States
- Original language: English
- No. of seasons: 3
- No. of episodes: 28

Production
- Executive producers: Lashan Browning; Donna Edge-Rachell; Paris Bauldwin; Daniel Wiener; Mimi Adams; Rich Allen; Michael Carrozza
- Running time: 42–44 minutes
- Production company: MTV Entertainment Studios

Original release
- Network: VH1
- Release: February 8, 2021 – February 6, 2023

Related
- Love & Hip Hop: New York; Love & Hip Hop: Atlanta; Love & Hip Hop: Hollywood; Love & Hip Hop: Miami

Family Reunion: Love & Hip Hop Edition is an American reality television series that premiered February 8, 2021 on VH1. The series serves as a spin-off and crossover of the network's Love & Hip Hop franchise; featuring cast members from Love & Hip Hop: New York, Love & Hip Hop: Atlanta, Love & Hip Hop: Hollywood and Love & Hip Hop: Miami.

It is the first Love & Hip Hop-related series to be produced in-house by MTV Entertainment Studios, with no involvement from creator Mona Scott-Young or her Monami Productions company.

== Development ==
In early 2020, production on the Love & Hip Hop franchise was shut down for the first time in 6 years due to the COVID-19 pandemic. On June 12, 2020, VH1 announced that they had severed their relationship with Big Fish Entertainment, after their reality show Live PD was canceled due to the handling of the video footage of the killing of Javier Ambler.

On October 8, 2020, Mona Scott-Young confirmed VH1 were working on "reimagining" the franchise to be produced in-house. Family Reunion was one of several Love & Hip Hop specials and limited series to be produced during this period; including Love & Hip Hop: Secrets Unlocked, and Love & Hip Hop: It's a Love Thing.

=== Overview and casting ===
The first season features Love & Hip Hop: New York's Yandy Smith-Harris, Jim Jones' former manager, her husband Mendeecees Harris and his mother Judy Harris, Love & Hip Hop: Atlanta's Karlie Redd, Yung Joc, Lil Scrappy, his wife Adiz "Bambi" Benson, his mother Momma Dee, his baby mama Erica Dixon, and beauty shop owner Sierra Gates, Love & Hip Hop: Hollywood's Ray J, Lil' Fizz, Omarion's baby mama Apryl Jones, and K. Michelle's former assistant Paris Phillips, and Love & Hip Hop: Miami's Trina, Trick Daddy and his ex-wife Joy Young.

The series also features Trick's 19-year-old son Jayden Young, Joc's 20-year-old son Amoni Robinson, and Karlie's 26-year-old daughter Jasmine Ellis, as well as guest appearances from Tamika D. Mallory, social justice leader and co-founder of social justice organization Until Freedom, and hip-hop artist and activist Mysonne.

The second season features Love & Hip Hop: New York's Rich Dollaz, Olivia's former manager, Juelz Santana and his wife Kimbella Vanderhee, Peter Gunz and his baby mothers Amina Buddafly and Tara Wallace, Joe Budden's baby mama Cyn Santana, producer Cisco Rosado and stylist Jonathan Fernandez, Love & Hip Hop: Atlanta's Mimi Faust and her baby daddy Stevie J, Erica Mena, Shekinah Jo Anderson, former best friend of Tiny Harris, and Safaree Samuels, Love & Hip Hop: Hollywood's Brooke Valentine and her husband Marcus Black, Daniel "Booby" Gibson, stylist Zellswag and Yo-Yo, and Love & Hip Hop: Miami's Bobby Lytes, Trina's cousin. Later, Hollywood's Paris Phillips returns from last season.

The third season features Love & Hip Hop: New York's Jim Jones, his fiancée Chrissy Lampkin and mother Nancy "Mama" Jones, Mariahlynn, Phresher and his wife Jenn Coreano, Love & Hip Hop: Atlanta's Karen "KK" King and her son Scrapp DeLeon, Spice, Tokyo Vanity, Estelita Quintero and Alexis Skyy, Love & Hip Hop: Hollywood's Teairra Mari, Nikki Mudarris and Lyrica Anderson, Love & Hip Hop: Miami's Amara La Negra, Gunplay, Shay Johnson and her brother Emjay Johnson, Miami Tip, Khaotic and Sukihana. Atlanta's Karlie Redd, Shekinah Jo and Safaree, and Miami's Trick Daddy return from previous seasons.

== Cast ==
Cast member	Original series	Seasons		
Cast member	Original series	1	2	3
Trick Daddy	Miami	Starring		Starring
Yung Joc	Atlanta	Starring		
Ray J	Hollywood	Starring		
Lil Scrappy	Atlanta	Starring		
Yandy Smith-Harris	New York	Starring		
Momma Dee	Atlanta	Starring		
Paris Phillips	Hollywood	Starring	Starring	
Lil' Fizz	Hollywood	Starring		
Sierra Gates	Atlanta	Starring		
Joy Young	Miami	Starring		
Trina	Miami	Starring		
Bambi Benson	Atlanta	Starring		
Karlie Redd	Atlanta	Starring		Starring
Mendeecees Harris	New York	Starring		
Apryl Jones	Hollywood	Starring		
Judy Harris	New York	Starring		
Erica Dixon	Atlanta	Starring		
Mimi Faust	Atlanta		Starring	
Jonathan Fernandez	New York		Starring	
Brooke Valentine	Hollywood		Starring	
Cyn Santana	New York		Starring	
Peter Gunz	New York		Starring	
Rich Dollaz	New York		Starring	
Zellswag	Hollywood		Starring	Guest
Shekinah Jo Anderson	Atlanta		Starring	Starring
Yo-Yo	Hollywood		Starring	
Cisco Rosado	New York		Starring	
Juelz Santana	New York		Starring	
Tara Wallace	New York		Starring	
Amina Buddafly	New York		Starring	
Erica Mena	Atlanta		Starring	
Bobby Lytes	Miami		Starring	
Daniel "Booby" Gibson	Hollywood		Starring	
Kimbella Vanderhee	New York		Starring	
Marcus Black	Hollywood		Starring	
Safaree Samuels	Atlanta		Starring	Starring
Stevie J	Atlanta		Starring	
Spice	Atlanta			Starring
Amara La Negra	Miami			Starring
Mariahlynn	New York			Starring
Estelita Quintero	Atlanta			Starring
Chrissy Lampkin	New York			Starring
Scrapp DeLeon	Atlanta			Starring
Nikki Mudarris	Hollywood			Starring
Teairra Marí	Hollywood			Starring
Gunplay	Miami			Starring
Jenn Coreano	New York			Starring
Phresher	New York			Starring
Lyrica Anderson	Hollywood			Starring
Karen King	Atlanta			Starring
Alexis Skyy	Atlanta			Starring
Khaotic	Miami			Starring
Tokyo Vanity	Atlanta			Starring
Shay Johnson	Miami			Starring
Emjay Johnson	Miami			Starring
Nancy "Mama" Jones	New York			Starring
Sukihana	Miami			Starring
Miami Tip	Miami			Starring
Jim Jones	New York			Starring

== Episodes ==
=== Series overview ===
Season	Episodes	Originally released	
Season	Episodes	First released	Last released
1	7	February 8, 2021	March 22, 2021
2	10	December 13, 2021	February 14, 2022
3	11	November 28, 2022	February 6, 2023

=== Season 1 (2021) ===
No. overall	No. in season	Title	Original release date	US viewers (millions)
1	1	"Reunited and It Feels So Good"	February 8, 2021	0.52
featuring: Yandy, Mendeecees, Judy (New York), Momma Dee, Joc, Sierra, Karlie, Scrappy, Bambi (Atlanta), Paris, Fizz, Apryl, Ray J (Hollywood), Trick Daddy, Joy, Trina (Miami) also featuring: Jayden (Trick Daddy's son), Amoni (Joc's son), Jasmine (Karlie's daughter)
2	2	"Parent Trap"	February 15, 2021	0.50
added to the cast: Erica (Atlanta)
3	3	"Until Freedom"	February 22, 2021	0.47
guest stars: Tamika Mallory (social justice leader), Mysonne Linen (Until Freedom co-founder)
4	4	"Who Run the World?"	March 1, 2021	0.52
guest stars: Tamika Mallory (social justice leader), Mysonne Linen (Until Freedom co-founder)
5	5	"Holy Hell"	March 8, 2021	0.45
6	6	"Bothered"	March 15, 2021	0.43
7	7	"We Are Family"	March 22, 2021	0.45

=== Season 2 (2021–22) ===
No. overall	No. in season	Title	Original release date	US viewers (millions)
8	1	"When Friends Are Like Family"	December 13, 2021	0.56
featuring: Jonathan, Cyn Santana, Peter Gunz, Rich Dollaz, Cisco, Kimbella, Juelz Santana, Tara, Amina Buddafly (New York), Mimi Faust, Shekinah, Erica Mena (Atlanta), Brooke Valentine, Marcus, Zellswag, Yo-Yo, Booby Gibson (Hollywood), Bobby Lytes (Miami)
9	2	"It's All Fun and Games until the Estranged Husband Arrives"	December 20, 2021	0.42
added to the cast: Safaree (Atlanta)
10	3	"They Found Love in a Hopeless Place"	December 27, 2021	0.46
11	4	"From Sex Charades to Cisco, This S*** Is Crazy"	January 3, 2022	0.51
12	5	"Home Is Where the Family Is"	January 10, 2022	0.59
added to the cast: Stevie J (Atlanta)
13	6	"Another the Other Woman"	January 17, 2022	0.52
14	7	"Pride and Prejudice and Ladybuggate"	January 24, 2022	0.65
15	8	"Blood Is Thicker Than Mud"	January 31, 2022	0.57
added to the cast: Paris Phillips (Hollywood)
16	9	"A Creepy Surprise and the Surprise Un-Anniversary Party"	February 7, 2022	0.57
17	10	"Unconditional Love In A Family Dose"	February 14, 2022	0.50

=== Season 3 (2022–23) ===
No. overall	No. in season	Title	Original release date	US viewers (millions)
18	1	"Sun-Dazed & Confused"	November 28, 2022	0.48
featuring: Mariahlynn, Chrissy, Jen, Phresher (New York), Spice, Karlie Redd, Estelita, Scrapp DeLeon, Karen "KK" King, Alexis Skyy (Atlanta), Nikki Baby, Teairra Mari, Lyrica (Hollywood), Amara La Negra, Trick Daddy, Gunplay, Khaotic (Miami) guest stars: Beenie Man (dancehall artist)
19	2	"Seeing Redd"	December 5, 2022	0.46
added to the cast: Tokyo Vanity (Atlanta), Shay, Emjay (Miami) guest stars: Zell Swagg (Hollywood)
20	3	"All For One and One For Brawl"	December 12, 2022	0.49
departs the cast: Tokyo Vanity
21	4	"Tricks & Stones"	December 19, 2022	0.42
departs the cast: Trick Daddy added to the cast: Nancy "Mama" Jones (New York)
22	5	"Under Phresher"	December 26, 2022	0.37
added to the cast: Shekinah (Atlanta)
23	6	"Pride Aside And Enjoy The Ride"	January 2, 2023	0.42
24	7	"A Song Of Fire & Spice"	January 9, 2023	0.45
25	8	"Jamaican Me Crazy"	January 16, 2023	0.38
added to the cast: Sukihana (Miami)
26	9	"Party Like It's 1999"	January 23, 2023	0.42
added to the cast: Miami Tip (Miami), Safaree (Atlanta)
27	10	"The Future Belongs To Those Who Prepare For It Today"	January 30, 2023	0.37
28	11	"The End is Only the Beginning"	February 6, 2023	0.36
added to the cast: Jim Jones (New York)
