= List of Love & Hip Hop: Atlanta episodes =

Love & Hip Hop: Atlanta is the second installment of the Love & Hip Hop reality television franchise. It premiered June 18, 2012 on VH1, and chronicles the lives of several people in Atlanta involved with hip hop music.

== Series overview ==
Season	Episodes		Originally released	
Season	Episodes		First released	Last released
1	12		June 18, 2012	September 3, 2012
2	17		April 22, 2013	August 12, 2013
3	20		May 5, 2014	September 8, 2014
4	19		April 20, 2015	August 31, 2015
5	18		April 4, 2016	August 8, 2016
6	18		March 6, 2017	July 17, 2017
7	18		March 19, 2018	July 16, 2018
8	20		March 25, 2019	July 29, 2019
9	9		March 16, 2020	May 11, 2020
10	29	13	July 5, 2021	September 27, 2021
10	29	16	August 8, 2022	November 21, 2022
11	31	15	June 13, 2023	September 26, 2023
11	31	16	January 9, 2024	April 23, 2024
12	31	14	July 23, 2024	October 22, 2024
12	31	17	January 7, 2025	April 29, 2025
13	29	15	July 8, 2025	October 14, 2025
13	29	14	February 17, 2026	May 19, 2026

== Episodes ==
=== Season 1 (2012) ===
No. overall	No. in season	Title	Original release date	US viewers (millions)
1	1	"The "A" List"	June 18, 2012	1.92
2	2	"Pregnito"	June 25, 2012	2.84
3	3	"Kiss & Yell"	July 2, 2012	2.81
4	4	"Scrappin'"	July 9, 2012	3.39
5	5	"No Receipts"	July 16, 2012	2.69
6	6	"No Apologies"	July 23, 2012	3.53
7	7	"Therapy?"	July 30, 2012	3.21
8	8	"Three's Company"	August 6, 2012	3.34
9	9	"Loyalty Card"	August 13, 2012	3.17
10	10	"Smoke and Mirrors"	August 20, 2012	3.71
11	11	"Reunion – Part 1"	August 27, 2012	4.10
12	12	"Reunion – Part 2"	September 3, 2012	4.40

=== Season 2 (2013) ===
No. overall	No. in season	Title	Original release date	US viewers (millions)
13	1	"Back in the A"	April 22, 2013	2.94
14	2	"She Loves Me Not"	April 29, 2013	2.86
15	3	"Dinner Beef"	May 6, 2013	3.06
16	4	"He Said, She Said"	May 13, 2013	3.06
17	5	"Baggage"	May 20, 2013	2.85
18	6	"Making a Scene"	May 27, 2013	2.46
19	7	"N.Y. State Of Mind"	June 3, 2013	2.81
20	8	"Come to Daddy"	June 10, 2013	2.96
21	9	"The Keymaster"	June 17, 2013	3.20
22	10	"A Failed Test"	June 24, 2013	3.12
23	11	"Mistake at the Lake"	July 1, 2013	3.23
24	12	"Turnt Up"	July 8, 2013	3.49
25	13	"Up in Flames"	July 15, 2013	3.59
26	14	"Boriqua"	July 22, 2013	3.66
27	15	"Lord of the Rings"	July 29, 2013	4.14
28	16	"Reunion – Part 1"	August 5, 2013	4.19
29	17	"Reunion – Part 2"	August 12, 2013	4.12

=== Season 3 (2014) ===
No. overall	No. in season	Title	Original release date	US viewers (millions)
30	1	"The Next Chapter"	May 5, 2014	3.76
31	2	"Leaked"	May 7, 2014	2.64
32	3	"The Results Are In"	May 12, 2014	3.21
33	4	"New Help"	May 19, 2014	3.41
34	5	"Party Foul"	May 26, 2014	3.00
35	6	"What's Your Position?"	June 2, 2014	3.58
36	7	"The Past, My Ass"	June 9, 2014	3.48
37	8	"Change of Course"	June 16, 2014	3.89
38	9	"Three Way, No Way"	June 23, 2014	3.83
39	10	"A Bullet in the Arm"	June 30, 2014	3.79
40	11	"Round and Round We Go"	July 7, 2014	3.75
41	12	"Release Day"	July 14, 2014	3.88
42	13	"Life Happens"	July 21, 2014	3.93
43	14	"Loss for Words"	July 28, 2014	3.43
44	15	"Blast From the Past"	July 31, 2014	2.15
45	16	"La La Land"	August 11, 2014	3.69
46	17	"Over and Out"	August 18, 2014	3.90
47	18	"Reunion – Part 1"	August 25, 2014	3.98
48	19	"Reunion – Part 2"	September 1, 2014	4.06
49	20	"Reunion – Part 3"	September 8, 2014	3.72

=== Season 4 (2015) ===
No. overall	No. in season	Title	Original release date	US viewers (millions)
50	1	"The Danger Zone"	April 20, 2015	3.54
51	2	"Say Goodbye"	April 27, 2015	2.96
52	3	"Rehabilitation"	May 4, 2015	2.65
53	4	"Cuffed Up"	May 11, 2015	2.80
54	5	"Rumor Has It..."	May 18, 2015	3.12
55	6	"Face the Music"	June 1, 2015	2.57
56	7	"Three-Ring Circus"	June 8, 2015	2.59
57	8	"The Truth Hurts"	June 15, 2015	2.67
58	9	"I Deserve"	June 22, 2015	3.00
59	10	"Friends With Benefits"	June 29, 2015	2.96
60	11	"On the Road"	July 6, 2015	2.93
61	12	"Blast From the Past"	July 12, 2015	1.85
62	13	"Revenge"	July 20, 2015	2.97
63	14	"Countdown"	July 27, 2015	2.94
64	15	"Doing Me"	August 3, 2015	2.79
65	16	"Bait and Switch"	August 10, 2015	2.94
66	17	"I Do"	August 17, 2015	3.32
67	18	"Reunion – Part 1"	August 24, 2015	3.35
68	19	"Reunion – Part 2"	August 31, 2015	3.41

=== Season 5 (2016) ===
No. overall	No. in season	Title	Original release date	US viewers (millions)
69	1	"Of Kings and Queens"	April 4, 2016	2.85
70	2	"Full Disclosure"	April 11, 2016	2.75
71	3	"Daddy's Home"	April 18, 2016	2.82
72	4	"Blackmail"	April 25, 2016	2.67
73	5	"Watch Your Back"	May 2, 2016	2.73
74	6	"Mother of All Problems"	May 8, 2016	1.75
75	7	"Playing With Fire"	May 16, 2016	2.85
76	8	"Common Ground"	May 23, 2016	2.79
77	9	"Free At Last"	May 30, 2016	2.29
78	10	"Final Goodbye"	June 6, 2016	2.69
79	11	"Mystery Solved"	June 20, 2016	2.72
80	12	"Lovers or Friends?"	June 27, 2016	2.71
81	13	"Funny Business"	July 4, 2016	1.87
82	14	"Confessions"	July 11, 2016	2.71
83	15	"Heart to Heart"	July 18, 2016	2.81
84	16	"Final Outcome"	July 25, 2016	2.64
85	17	"Exposed & Unfiltered – Part 1"	August 1, 2016	2.66
86	18	"Exposed & Unfiltered – Part 2"	August 8, 2016	2.46

=== Season 6 (2017) ===
No. overall	No. in season	Title	Original release date	US viewers (millions)
87	1	"Who's Your Daddy"	March 6, 2017	3.21
88	2	"Family Matters"	March 13, 2017	3.08
89	3	"Sister Wives"	March 20, 2017	2.73
90	4	"In With the New"	March 27, 2017	3.08
91	5	"War and Peace"	April 3, 2017	2.78
92	6	"Frenemies"	April 10, 2017	2.90
93	7	"Grapes of Wrath"	April 17, 2017	3.14
94	8	"In Due Time"	April 24, 2017	2.92
95	9	"Bachelor Bash"	May 8, 2017	2.50
96	10	"Up in Flames"	May 15, 2017	2.29
97	11	"Keep It Real"	May 22, 2017	2.51
98	12	"Jamaican Flavor"	June 5, 2017	2.67
99	13	"Jamaican Me Crazy"	June 12, 2017	2.60
100	14	"Reality Bites"	June 19, 2017	2.69
101	15	"When All Else Fails"	June 26, 2017	2.50
102	16	"The End Is Near"	July 3, 2017	2.34
103	17	"Reunion – Part 1"	July 10, 2017	2.71
104	18	"Reunion – Part 2"	July 17, 2017	2.73

=== Season 7 (2018) ===
No. overall	No. in season	Title	Original release date	US viewers (millions)
105	1	"Let the Games Begin"	March 19, 2018	2.21
106	2	"Oh Baby"	March 26, 2018	1.90
107	3	"Beginnings and Endings"	April 2, 2018	1.90
108	4	"Do It For Finesse"	April 9, 2018	2.03
109	5	"Dangerous Liaisons"	April 16, 2018	1.97
110	6	"I'm Telling"	April 23, 2018	2.01
111	7	"Showing Out"	April 30, 2018	2.05
112	8	"Tokyo Insanity"	May 7, 2018	2.06
113	9	"Team Rasheeda"	May 14, 2018	2.02
114	10	"The Friendtervention"	May 21, 2018	2.03
115	11	"Houston, We Have A Problem"	May 28, 2018	1.92
116	12	"Don't Mess With Texas"	June 4, 2018	2.11
117	13	"Cowgirls Gone Wild"	June 11, 2018	2.32
118	14	"Horsing Around"	June 18, 2018	2.10
119	15	"Showing Off"	June 25, 2018	2.10
120	16	"Peace & Blessings"	July 2, 2018	2.08
121	17	"Reunion – Part 1"	July 9, 2018	2.13
122	18	"Reunion – Part 2"	July 16, 2018	2.05

=== Season 8 (2019) ===
No. overall	No. in season	Title	Original release date	US viewers (millions)
123	1	"A New Dawn"	March 25, 2019	1.99
124	2	"Unfriended"	March 25, 2019	2.09
125	3	"On the Plus Side"	April 1, 2019	1.64
126	4	"Case of the Ex"	April 8, 2019	1.54
127	5	"The Skin You're In"	April 15, 2019	1.52
128	6	"One for the Ages"	April 22, 2019	1.55
129	7	"The Immaculate Conception"	April 29, 2019	1.62
130	8	"Cabin Confessions"	May 6, 2019	1.58
131	9	"You Flew Here, I Grew Here"	May 13, 2019	1.48
132	10	"To the Left"	May 20, 2019	1.45
133	11	"Excess Baggage"	May 27, 2019	1.45
134	12	"Up All Night"	June 3, 2019	1.50
135	13	"Spice World"	June 10, 2019	1.47
136	14	"Redd Flags"	June 17, 2019	1.52
137	15	"Questions and Answers"	June 24, 2019	1.65
138	16	"Do Not Engage"	July 1, 2019	1.51
139	17	"Put It On Your Mama"	July 8, 2019	1.75
140	18	"Winner Take All"	July 15, 2019	1.60
141	19	"Reunion – Part 1"	July 22, 2019	1.74
142	20	"Reunion – Part 2"	July 29, 2019	1.90

=== Season 9 (2020) ===
No. overall	No. in season	Title	Original release date	US viewers (millions)
143	1	"Bobbit It Off!"	March 16, 2020	1.45
144	2	"No Witness, No Protection"	March 23, 2020	1.48
145	3	"Oh Deer"	March 30, 2020	1.45
146	4	"Queen of Atlanta"	April 6, 2020	1.45
147	5	"Slippery Slope"	April 13, 2020	1.35
148	6	"You Trippin"	April 20, 2020	1.32
149	7	"Black Diamond"	April 27, 2020	1.35
150	8	"The Kids Are Alright"	May 4, 2020	1.23
151	9	"Shut It Down"	May 11, 2020	1.24

=== Season 10 (2021–22) ===
No. overall	No. in season	Title	Original release date	US viewers (millions)
Part 1
152	1	"The New Normal"	July 5, 2021	0.95
153	2	"Good Trouble"	July 12, 2021	0.84
154	3	"Oh, Baby!"	July 19, 2021	0.62
155	4	"Blast From The Past"	July 26, 2021	0.71
156	5	"A Ruff Road"	August 2, 2021	0.73
157	6	"Shape Up or Ship Out"	August 9, 2021	0.73
158	7	"See You at the Crossroads"	August 16, 2021	0.79
159	8	"Excess Baggage"	August 23, 2021	0.71
160	9	"Mama Drama"	August 30, 2021	0.76
161	10	"For Better or For Worse"	September 6, 2021	0.73
162	11	"Face the Music"	September 13, 2021	0.77
163	12	"Old Wounds"	September 20, 2021	0.73
164	13	"Family Over Everything"	September 27, 2021	0.68
Part 2
165	14	"Get Off My Joc"	August 8, 2022	0.76
166	15	"Taste of Your Own Meda-cine"	August 15, 2022	0.62
167	16	"I Do, Do You?"	August 22, 2022	0.72
168	17	"Heirs to the Throne"	August 29, 2022	0.65
169	18	"Baby Bump in the Road"	September 5, 2022	0.70
170	19	"Graci Under Fire"	September 12, 2022	0.59
171	20	"Heart Of The Matter"	September 19, 2022	0.67
172	21	"Who's Your Daddy?"	September 26, 2022	0.52
173	22	"Carpe DM'd"	October 3, 2022	0.59
174	23	"Salty Spice"	October 10, 2022	0.57
175	24	"Show-Down Girls"	October 17, 2022	0.64
176	25	"Thirsty Thots"	October 24, 2022	0.55
177	26	"Tears & Loathing In Las Vegas"	October 31, 2022	0.51
178	27	"No Scrapp Left Behind"	November 7, 2022	0.55
179	28	"Reunion – Part 1"	November 14, 2022	0.57
180	29	"Reunion – Part 2"	November 21, 2022	0.53

=== Season 11 (2023–24) ===
No. overall	No. in season	Title	Original release date	US viewers (millions)
Part 1
181	1	"Out Of The Woods, Back In These Streets"	June 13, 2023	0.51
182	2	"Straight Outta Excuses"	June 20, 2023	0.45
183	3	"Thin Redd Line"	June 27, 2023	0.43
184	4	"Baby Got Back Up"	July 4, 2023	0.36
185	5	"Give Them Grace"	July 11, 2023	0.45
186	6	"Brokedown Palace"	July 18, 2023	0.49
187	7	"Sorry, Not Sorry"	July 25, 2023	0.47
188	8	"Renni, Aim, Fire"	August 1, 2023	0.46
189	9	"Frostbite"	August 8, 2023	0.44
190	10	"Hot Tea, Wet Banks"	August 15, 2023	0.40
191	11	"Miami Vices"	August 22, 2023	0.52
192	12	"Mena-ce to Society"	August 29, 2023	0.41
193	13	"Tropic Thunderdome"	September 5, 2023	0.48
194	14	"Resting Beach Face"	September 19, 2023	0.47
195	15	"Bahamian Rhapsody"	September 26, 2023	0.47
Part 2
196	16	"The Sum of All Tears"	January 9, 2024	0.45
197	17	"Eggs-istential Crisis"	January 16, 2024	0.45
198	18	"Mad Love"	January 23, 2024	0.39
199	19	"I Can't Belize It"	January 30, 2024	0.40
200	20	"Panic At The Disco"	February 6, 2024	0.37
201	21	"Cease & Dismiss"	February 13, 2024	0.35
202	22	"Arrested Development"	February 20, 2024	0.35
203	23	"Day of Our Lies"	February 27, 2024	0.34
204	24	"Bae Watch"	March 5, 2024	0.42
205	25	"Reddy or Not"	March 12, 2024	0.36
206	26	"It's A (Thirst) Trap"	March 19, 2024	0.40
207	27	"Blame Canada"	March 26, 2024	0.32
208	28	"Sassing Through the Snow"	April 2, 2024	0.33
209	29	"Melting Point"	April 9, 2024	0.34
210	30	"Expecting and Unexpected"	April 16, 2024	0.30
211	31	"Hard Pressed"	April 23, 2024	0.36

=== Season 12 (2024–25) ===
No. overall	No. in season	Title	Original release date	US viewers (millions)
Part 1
212	1	"Hot & Heavy Handed"	July 23, 2024	0.36
213	2	"Serving Tea and Shade"	July 30, 2024	0.32
214	3	"It's a Read-ing Rainbow"	August 6, 2024	0.32
215	4	"The Mommas and the Pop Off"	August 13, 2024	0.31
216	5	"Pride & Precedents"	August 20, 2024	0.27
217	6	"Astral Projecting"	August 27, 2024	0.38
218	7	"Contextual Relations"	September 3, 2024	0.47
219	8	"What's in a Name?"	September 10, 2024	0.36
220	9	"Baby Mama Mia"	September 17, 2024	0.39
221	10	"Great Ex-pectations"	September 24, 2024	0.44
222	11	"Enemy at the Gates"	October 1, 2024	0.37
223	12	"Disscontent"	October 8, 2024	0.41
224	13	"Non-Sense & Sensibility"	October 15, 2024	0.38
225	14	"Disstopia"	October 22, 2024	0.39
Part 2
226	15	"It's All About the Big Benjamins, Baby!"	January 7, 2025	0.38
227	16	"Thames the Brakes"	January 14, 2025	0.38
228	17	"Keep Calm & Wagwan"	January 21, 2025	0.37
229	18	"Three Men & a Baby"	January 28, 2025	0.37
230	19	"Coming in Hot Like a Supernova"	February 4, 2025	0.29
231	20	"Unwellcome"	February 11, 2025	0.30
232	21	"Skating the Issue"	February 18, 2025	0.34
233	22	"Redd, White, & Bleu"	February 25, 2025	0.34
234	23	"Screenshots Fired"	March 4, 2025	0.36
235	24	"Run It Back"	March 11, 2025	0.38
236	25	"Tow-tal Eclipse of the Heart"	March 18, 2025	0.35
237	26	"On the Border of Chaos"	March 25, 2025	0.31
238	27	"Bae Costal"	April 1, 2025	0.34
239	28	"Beached Wail"	April 8, 2025	0.32
240	29	"Beach, Don't Kill My Vibe"	April 15, 2025	0.26
241	30	"Sip & Seething"	April 22, 2025	0.43
242	31	"Alternate Endings"	April 29, 2025	0.32

=== Season 13 (2025–26) ===
No. overall	No. in season	Title	Original release date	US viewers (millions)
243	1	"The 11th Hour"	July 8, 2025	0.43
244	2	"Sound the Retreat"	July 15, 2025	0.33
245	3	"Off Key"	July 22, 2025	0.33
246	4	"Post Modern Family"	July 29, 2025	0.31
247	5	"The Tight Faces of ATL"	August 5, 2025	0.35
248	6	"Remember the Acrimony"	August 12, 2025	0.33
249	7	"On My Momma"	August 19, 2025	0.31
250	8	"Rules of Engagement"	August 26, 2025	0.29
251	9	"Girls Interrupted"	September 2, 2025	0.35
252	10	"The Real OG of Atlanta"	September 9, 2025	0.38
253	11	"A Common Wealth of Problems"	September 16, 2025	0.32
254	12	"Hispanyolo"	September 23, 2025	0.29
255	13	"Be Hispanic, Not His Peace"	September 30, 2025	0.23
256	14	"Don't Hate the Playa, Hate the Game"	October 7, 2025	0.30
257	15	"Karlito's Way"	October 14, 2025	0.23
Part 2
258	16	"Southern Fried Lies"	February 17, 2026	0.52
259	17	"Problems 24/7"	February 24, 2026	N/A
260	18	"Kicking & Streaming"	March 3, 2026	N/A
261	19	"Girls Trippin'"	March 10, 2026	N/A
262	20	"Slims To None"	March 17, 2026	N/A
263	21	"Gated Community"	March 24, 2026	N/A
264	22	"Guess Who's Coming To Dinner"	March 31, 2026	N/A
265	23	"Grand Gesture or Grand Jester?"	April 7, 2026	N/A
266	24	"Show Up or Showdown"	April 14, 2026	N/A
267	25	"Spin The Blockade"	April 21, 2026	N/A
268	26	"He Wasn't Manager Enough For Me"	April 28, 2026	N/A
269	27	"Camp Get Away"	May 5, 2026	N/A
270	28	"Unhappy Campers"	May 12, 2026	N/A
271	29	"Means To An Ending"	May 19, 2026	N/A

== Specials ==
Year	Special	Season	Premiere	Viewers (millions)
2012	Love & Hip Hop Atlanta: Dirty Little Secrets	1	December 16, 2012	1.22
2017	Love & Hip Hop Atlanta: Joseline's Special Delivery	6	May 1, 2017	2.18
2017	Love & Hip Hop Atlanta: Dirty Little Secrets 2	6	May 10, 2017	1.05
2019	Love & Hip Hop Awards: Most Certified	8	April 1, 2019	0.99
2019	40 Greatest Love & Hip Hop Moments: The Reboot	8	April 8, 2019	0.80
2021	Love & Hip Hop Atlanta: Inside the A	10	June 28, 2021	0.44

== Ratings ==
Love & Hip Hop: Atlanta : U.S. viewers per episode (millions)

Season	Episode number																							
Season	1	2	3	4	5	6	7	8	9	10	11	12	13	14	15	16	17	18	19	20	21	22	23	24
1	1.92	2.84	2.81	3.39	2.69	3.53	3.21	3.34	3.17	3.71	4.10	4.40	–											
2	2.94	2.86	3.06	3.06	2.85	2.45	2.81	2.96	3.20	3.12	3.23	3.49	3.59	3.66	4.14	4.19	4.12	–						
3	3.76	2.64	3.21	3.41	3.00	3.58	3.48	3.89	3.83	3.79	3.75	3.88	3.93	3.43	2.15	3.69	3.90	3.98	4.06	3.72	–			
4	3.54	2.96	2.65	2.80	3.12	2.57	2.59	2.67	3.00	2.96	2.93	1.85	2.97	2.94	2.79	2.94	3.32	3.35	3.41	–				
5	2.85	2.75	2.82	2.67	2.73	1.75	2.85	2.79	2.29	2.69	2.72	2.71	1.87	2.71	2.81	2.64	2.66	2.46	–					
6	3.21	3.08	2.73	3.08	2.78	2.90	3.14	2.92	2.50	2.29	2.51	2.67	2.60	2.69	2.50	2.34	2.71	2.73	–					
7	2.21	1.90	1.90	2.03	1.97	2.01	2.05	2.06	2.02	2.03	1.92	2.11	2.32	2.10	2.10	2.08	2.13	2.05	–					
8	1.99	2.09	1.64	1.54	1.52	1.55	1.62	1.58	1.48	1.45	1.45	1.50	1.47	1.52	1.65	1.51	1.75	1.60	1.74	1.90	–			
9	1.45	1.48	1.45	1.45	1.35	1.32	1.35	1.23	1.24	–														
10	0.95	0.84	0.62	0.71	0.73	0.73	0.79	0.71	0.76	0.73	0.77	0.73	0.68	0.76	0.62	0.72	0.65	0.70	0.59	0.67	0.52	0.59	0.57	0.64
11	0.51	–																						

Audience measurement performed by Nielsen Media Research
