= Tommie Lee =

American rapper, television personality, and actress (born 1984)

- Born: Atasha Chizaah Jefferson; June 19, 1984 (age 42); Newark, New Jersey, US
- Occupations: Television personality; rapper; actress
- Years active: 2015–present
- Television: Love & Hip Hop: Atlanta; Baddies
- Children: 2

Atasha Chizaah Jefferson (born June 19, 1984), known professionally as Tommie Lee, is an American rapper, television personality, and social media influencer. She is best known for her appearances on the VH1 reality television series Love & Hip Hop: Atlanta, where she was a series regular during multiple seasons, and for later appearances on the Zeus Network reality franchise Baddies.

== Early life ==
Atasha Chizaah Jefferson was born on June 19, 1984, in Newark, New Jersey, to her mother, Samantha. She has multiple siblings, including brothers Reggie and Duby and sisters Versace and Rajaysha. As a child, she was known as "Tomboy Tash", which later inspired her stage name, Tommie. Her family moved to Atlanta, Georgia during her teenage years, where her stepfather struggled with substance abuse and she and her siblings spent time in and out of shelters. She did not graduate from high school and later obtained a GED.

== Career ==
In 2016, Lee joined the VH1 reality television series Love & Hip Hop: Atlanta during its fifth season as a supporting cast member. Regarded as one of the most memorable cast members in the Love & Hip Hop franchise, she was elevated to the main cast for the sixth and seventh seasons of the series until her subsequent departure. In 2017, Lee released her debut single, "Payback", and appeared on the cover artwork for the Migos' single "Bad and Boujee". In March 2019, Lee released a documentary titled Truth, which followed her personal life while addressing her efforts to overcome difficult situations and maintain a relationship with her daughters.

In August 2019, Lee announced that she would not return to Love & Hip Hop: Atlanta, stating that she left the series due to personal reasons and describing her experience on the show as "misery and depression". In 2022, Lee appeared as a judge during the casting special for the third season of the Zeus Network reality television series Baddies and subsequently joined the main cast of the series.

Lee has pursued entrepreneurial ventures, including launching a wine brand called Lè Don, and a cosmetics brand, Slantz by Tommie Lee, which markets false eyelashes and related cosmetic products.

== Personal life ==
Lee has two daughters, Havalli (born 2007) and Samaria (born July 20, 2003), Lee struggles with alcoholism and has briefly attended rehabilitation to address her addiction.

=== Legal issues ===
Lee has been involved in multiple legal disputes throughout her life, stating that she began encountering the criminal justice system as a teenager and has had numerous arrests over the years. In August 2016, during filming for Love & Hip Hop: Atlanta, fellow cast member Joseline Hernandez filed for and was granted a temporary restraining order against Lee after alleging that Lee attempted to strike her with a vehicle and made verbal threats while Hernandez was walking in Atlanta, Georgia. During the reunion for the series' fifth season, Lee stated on camera that she had attempted to hit Hernandez with her car, but later denied the allegation in a subsequent interview, disputing Hernandez' account of the incident. Through September 2016, Lee spent several days in jail after allegedly making threats in violation of the restraining order.

On October 18, 2018, Lee was arrested twice within 24 hours and charged with aggravated stalking and obstruction of justice following an incident involving one of her daughters, in which she reportedly shoved her daughter's head into a metal locker and dragged her by the hair. Lee stated that she went to her daughter's school to discipline her after learning the child had engaged in unsafe behavior, including distributing marijuana edibles to other students. Following her indictment on multiple felony charges for the incident, she pleaded guilty to one count of first-degree cruelty to children, three counts of simple battery, family violence, and one count of disrupting public school. Lee was sentenced to 10 years, with two years to serve and the remainder on probation; the two-year term was suspended contingent on her completion of a residential recovery program and 12 months of aftercare with a psychologist or psychiatrist. Her probation conditions included an 11:00 p.m. curfew, a $1,000 fine, random drug and alcohol testing, no violent contact with her children, and restrictions on travel and attending events where drugs or alcohol were present.

Lee has also faced DUI and probation violations, as well as other arrests for battery and disorderly conduct, including a 2023 arrest in Miami, Florida for alleged cocaine possession and disorderly conduct; she stated that the substance involved was her friend's prescribed medication.

On July 11, 2026, Lee was among six people arrested during the 2026 FIFA World Cup when she entered the England vs. Norway match through an unauthorized east entrance without a ticket.

== Discography ==
=== Singles ===
2017

- "Payback"

2018

- "Cheat on Me" (featuring Blac Youngsta)
- "Imma Get It" (featuring Spice)
- "Truth" (featuring Anthony Hamilton)

2019

- "Pressure"
- "No Cap"
- "Real One"

2023

- "Yea Hoe" (featuring Black Diamond)
- "What You Gon Do" (featuring Black Diamond)

2025

- "Baddie Bag" (DJ Sky High Baby featuring Tommie and Summer None Other)

== Filmography ==
=== Film ===
Year	Film	Role
2021	True to the Game 3	Coco

=== Television ===
Year	Title	Role	Notes
2016-18	Love & Hip Hop: Atlanta	Herself	Supporting cast (season 5); Main cast (seasons 6-7)
2017–18	Leave It to Stevie	Herself	Supporting cast (season 1); Guest (season 2)
2018	Love & Hip Hop: New York	Herself	Episode: "Love & Hip Hop: The Love Edition"
2018	Hip Hop Squares	Herself	Episode: "Gunplay vs. Tommie"
2022-present	Baddies	Herself	Main cast (seasons 3, 8-present); recurring cast (seasons 5-7)
2024	WTF Tommie Sh*t	Herself	Main cast
2025	Ms. Pat Settles It	Herself	Episode: "Bail, Baecation & Betrayal"
