= Love & Hip Hop: Atlanta =

American reality television series

- Genre: Reality television
- Created by: Mona Scott-Young
- Directed by: David Wolfgang; Josh Richards; Earl "Slick 23" Barlow; Jade Sandberg
- Starring: Rasheeda; Karlie Redd; Spice; Yung Joc; Scrappy; Sierra Gates; Bambi Benson; Kirk Frost; Erica Banks
- Opening theme: "This Is the Life"
- Composer: Lofey
- Country of origin: United States
- Original language: English
- No. of seasons: 13
- No. of episodes: 259 (list of episodes)

Production
- Executive producers: Brad Abramson; Mona Scott-Young; Danielle Gelfand; Nina L. Diaz; Stefan Springman; Stephanie R. Gayle; Toby Barraud; Donell Dorsey; Lil Scrappy; Britney Sims; 24hrs; Selma Slims; Shakira Hardy
- Running time: 40–42 minutes
- Production companies: Monami Productions; Eastern TV; Big Fish Entertainment; New Group Productions; MTV Entertainment Studios

Original release
- Network: VH1
- Release: June 18, 2012 – November 21, 2022
- Network: MTV
- Release: June 13, 2023 – May 19, 2026

Related
- Love & Hip Hop: New York; Love & Hip Hop: Hollywood; Love & Hip Hop: Miami; K. Michelle: My Life; Stevie J & Joseline: Go Hollywood; Leave It to Stevie

Love & Hip Hop: Atlanta is an American reality television series that premiered on VH1 on June 18, 2012 and concluded on MTV on May 19, 2026. The series chronicles the lives of several people in Atlanta involved with hip hop music, and features appearances from notable figures associated with Southern hip hop.

Atlanta is the second installment of the Love & Hip Hop franchise, and its longest-running spin-off. It would surpass the episode count of the original Love & Hip Hop: New York by the time of its ninth season in March 2020. In April 2023, it was announced that the series would move to MTV beginning with its eleventh season on June 13, 2023.

== Series synopsis ==
=== Overview and casting ===
Love & Hip Hop: Atlanta is a "docu-soap" that revolves around the everyday lives of women and men in hip hop's "dirty south". The first seasons focus on the personal and professional struggles of six women, two of which are known as girlfriends of famous R&B artists and rappers, and the other four are aspiring recording artists. Subsequent seasons expanded to include DJs and radio personalities, stylists, video vixens, glamour models, groupies and socialites. The show has a sprawling supporting cast, consisting mostly of men in the industry, who (in most cases) share the same amount of screen time and storyline focus as the show's leads.

=== Seasons 1–6 ===
The original cast lineup consisted of Joseline Hernandez, Erica Dixon, Rasheeda, K. Michelle, Karlie Redd and Mimi Faust, with Stevie J, Lil Scrappy, Scrappy's mother Momma Dee, Mimi's best friend Ariane Davis, Rasheeda's husband Kirk Frost, Benzino and Flavor of Love's Shay Johnson rounding out the supporting cast. All cast members returned for a second season, with the addition of radio personality Traci Steele and her former boyfriend DJ Babey Drew. During the season's reunion special, K. Michelle announced that she was leaving the show to join the cast of Love & Hip Hop: New York.

Traci and Drew were fired from the show, and season three saw the addition of Waka Flocka Flame, his long time girlfriend Tammy Rivera and his mother Deb Antney. Waka and Tammy eloped during filming. Other new cast members included Yung Joc, Kalenna Harper and her husband Tony Vick, Scrappy's girlfriend Bambi Benson, actress Erica Pinkett, booking agent Dawn Heflin and Benzino's girlfriend Althea Heart. Shay Johnson filmed scenes for the season but after a violent altercation during filming, in which she cracked a bottle over a woman's face in a night club brawl, she was removed from the cast and her scenes were left on the cutting room floor. The show's outrageous storylines and scandals throughout season three, particularly Mimi and Nikko's sex tape, Benzino's non-fatal shooting and Joseline and Stevie's allegedly drug-addled behavior at the reunion, drew the highest ratings in the franchise's history and made its cast members tabloid fixtures.

The fallout from the violence of season three's reunion, in which Stevie and Joseline interrupted filming and got into a brawl with Benzino and Althea onstage, saw the removal of Benzino and Althea from the cast, after allegedly making death threats as well as Tammy, who was also attacked by Joseline during taping, who announced that she and Waka were leaving the show to star in their own spin-off show Meet The Flockas. Although there was talk of suspending or even firing Stevie and Joseline for their behaviour at the reunion, season four saw Stevie J finally being promoted to the main cast after appearing in every episode prior as a supporting cast member, and Joseline ended up being absent only from the season's premiere episode. New cast members included Jessica Dime, a stripper-turned-rapper who shares a past with Joseline, Nikko's ex-wife Margeaux Simms, Yung Joc's girlfriend Khadiyah Lewis and his baby mama Sina Bina, aspiring singer Ashley Nicole, Tiffany Foxx and Momma Dee's ex-husband Ernest Bryant (who she remarried during filming). PreMadonna, an entrepreneur known for her waist trainer company, appeared in a supporting role for two episodes. Towards the end of the season, Tammy Rivera returned for three episodes in a supporting role.

After four seasons, Erica Dixon quit the series, calling it "mentally and physically draining". Season five saw the return of Tammy Rivera to the main cast after a season's absence, along with original cast member K. Michelle, who returned from the fourth episode onwards. Season five saw the addition of the controversial King family, which included "momager" Karen "KK" King, her rapper sons Scrapp DeLeon and Sas, Scrapp's girlfriend Tommie Lee and his baby mama Tiarra Becca. Other new cast members included Grammy Award-winning songwriter D. Smith, who became the first openly transgender castmate in the show's history, singer Betty Idol, Mimi's girlfriend Chris Gould, who would reveal his identity as a trans man in an episode near the end of season, Lyfe Jennings, Rasheeda's mother Shirleen Harvell, Kirk's daughter Kelsie Frost, radio personality J-Nicks and stripper Amber Priddy. One of season five's leading storylines was Joseline and Tommie's intense feud, which culminated in an off-camera incident in which Tommie attempted to run down Joseline with her car. In an effort to curb cast violence, the season's reunion format was changed so that the cast would film interviews separately and in small groups, without an audience. After appearing infrequently throughout the season and barely interacting with the cast, K. Michelle confirmed shortly after taping that she had again quit the show.

Despite pending legal issues relating to her incident with Joseline, season six saw Tommie promoted to the main cast. One of the season's leading storylines involved Rasheeda discovering that her husband Kirk had been unfaithful and had a secret baby with stripper Jasmine Washington. Jasmine became part of the show's cast, along with her lovers Rod Bullock and Keanna Arnold, who she is involved in a polyamorous relationship with. Other new cast members included club promoter Melissa Scott, social media personality and nail technician Lovely Mimi, beauty shop owner Sierra Gates, her assistant Moriah Lee and her husband Shooter Gates, aspiring radio personality Tresure Price, aspiring singer Estelita Quintero, Stevie J's daughter Savannah Jordan and Tommie's mother Samantha. Rapper Gunplay appeared as a supporting cast member for one episode, his appearance serving as a teaser for the spin-off Love & Hip Hop: Miami, which would premiere a few months later. Production on the season became increasingly troubled, with later episodes showing scenes of Joseline Hernandez and Kirk Frost breaking the fourth wall to express their displeasure with the producers. Behind the scenes during the reunion taping on June 1, 2017, tensions between Joseline, Mona Scott-Young and the other producers exploded, with Joseline announcing that she had quit the show after six seasons.

=== Seasons 7–10 ===
The cast of the seventh season, from left to right, top to bottom: Karlie, Tommie, Stevie J, Mimi, Rasheeda, Jessica Dime and Erica Mena.

Season seven saw the promotion of Jessica Dime to the main cast after appearing as a supporting cast member for three seasons, and the return of Erica Mena to the franchise, who previously appeared on Love & Hip Hop: New York for four seasons. Tammy Rivera left the cast to star in her own spin-off Meet the Flockas with Waka, but would make guest appearances throughout the season. New cast members include Jessica's fiancé Shawne Williams, Grammy Award winning songwriter Sean Garrett, Jamaican recording artist Spice, singer Just Brittany, rappers Tokyo Vanity, BK Brasco and Tabius Tate, music executive Keely the Boss and her promoter boyfriend K. Botchey. After a two-year absence, Erica Dixon returned as a supporting cast member. Love & Hip Hop: New York star Rich Dollaz would make a special crossover appearance in the last episodes of the season. During filming, Jessica Dime publicly criticised Mona Scott-Young for passing on a proposed wedding special starring her and Shawne. Subsequently, she was phased out of the show and did not attend the season's reunion.

On October 18, 2018, Tommie was arrested for allegedly attacking her daughter at her high school while heavily intoxicated. On January 3, 2019, while facing up to 54 years behind bars for the crime, Tommie confirmed that she would not be returning to the show. Spice, Scrapp DeLeon and Yung Joc would be promoted to the main cast for season eight, after appearing in previous seasons as supporting cast members. T.I. & Tiny: The Family Hustle's Shekinah Anderson, rapper Akbar V, socialite Pooh Hicks, Che Mack, Joc's fiancé Kendra Robinson and Love & Hip Hop: Hollywood's Moniece Slaughter would join the supporting cast, while Bambi's mother Cece Shaw and salon owner Sharonda Official would appear in minor supporting roles.

After appearing as a supporting cast member in every season prior, Scrappy was finally promoted to the main cast for season nine, along with Sierra Gates, who has been a supporting cast member for three seasons. New cast members would include Alexis Skyy, LightSkinKeisha, Ki'yomi Leslie and Scrapp's sister Cheyenne Robinson, with Love & Hip Hop: New York's Erica Mena and Safaree Samuels making special crossover appearances during the season.

After over a year long hiatus due to the COVID-19 pandemic, the show was retooled for season ten, with the promotion of Kirk Frost, Erica Mena and Safaree to the main cast, and the addition of rappers Yung Baby Tate and Omeretta the Great, along with Love & Hip Hop: New York's Yandy Smith-Harris and Mendeecees Harris. The show's couples – Rasheeda and Kirk, Erica and Safaree, Yandy and Mendeecees – are credited together in the opening credits. Karlie Redd, Scrappy and Joc were demoted to supporting cast, along with new cast members Renni Rucci, Kirk and Rasheeda's son Ky Frost, Yandy's foster daughter Infinity and mother-in-law Judy Harris (who previously appeared on Love & Hip Hop: New York), Karlie's daughter Jasmine and Joc's son Amoni (who previously appeared on Family Reunion: Love & Hip Hop Edition), Sierra's boyfriend Eric Whitehead and Spice's boyfriend Justin Budd. Original cast members Mimi Faust and Stevie J were removed from the show entirely, along with Scrapp DeLeon. The season continued a year later without Yung Baby Tate and Omeretta, and with the return of Joc and Scrappy to the opening credits, alongside Joc's fiancé Kendra and Scrappy's wife Bambi. Mimi returned in a supporting role for two episodes, at the end of the season.

=== Seasons 11–13 ===
On April 11, 2023, it was reported that the series would move to MTV for its eleventh season, which premiered on June 13, 2023, airing now on Tuesday nights and was once again retooled. New cast members Amy Luciani, Erica Banks and Jessica White are added to the opening credits, while Kirk, Mendeecees, Safaree, Scrappy, Joc and Kendra were demoted to supporting cast members. Former Love & Hip Hop: Miami cast member Khaotic is added to the supporting cast. Erica Dixon returns as a supporting cast member after another two-year absence. Rapper Diamond appears in a minor supporting role throughout the season.

On September 2, 2023, MTV announced that Mena won't be featured in the second half of season 11 due to the use of racial slurs in a heated exchange with Spice. The second half of the season returned on January 9, 2024, with Love & Hip Hop: Hollywood's ZellSwag and rapper Saucy Santana, who previously appeared on Love & Hip Hop: Miami, to the supporting cast.

In April 2024, MTV renewed the series for a twelfth season, which premiered on July 23, 2024. Yandy, Amy, Erica Banks and Jessica were demoted to supporting cast members, while Karlie Redd, Joc and Scrappy were added back to the opening credits along with Santana being promoted to the main cast, after appearing in the previous season in a supporting role. New cast members Lil Zane, Ashley, Ralo, Missy, Blacc Zacc, Xzavia Thomas and Kai join the supporting cast.

=== Cast timeline ===
Main cast (appears in opening credits)
Secondary cast (appears in green screen confessional segments and in end credits alongside the main cast)
Guest cast (appears in a guest role or cameo)

Cast member	Seasons																
Cast member	1	2	3	4	5	6	7	8	9	10a	10b	11a	11b	12a	12b	13a	13b
Rasheeda	Starring	Starring	Starring	Starring	Starring	Starring	Starring	Starring	Starring	Starring	Starring	Starring	Starring	Starring	Starring	Starring	Starring
Karlie Redd	Starring	Starring	Starring	Starring	Starring	Starring	Starring	Starring	Starring	Supporting	Supporting	Supporting	Supporting	Starring	Starring	Starring	Starring
Mimi Faust	Starring	Starring	Starring	Starring	Starring	Starring	Starring	Starring	Starring	Guest (Note: Appears in the Love & Hip Hop Atlanta: Inside the A special only.)	Supporting						
Joseline Hernandez	Starring	Starring	Starring	Starring	Starring	Starring											
Erica Dixon	Starring	Starring	Starring	Starring			Supporting	Supporting	Guest	Supporting		Supporting	Supporting	Supporting	Supporting	Supporting	Supporting
K. Michelle	Starring	Starring	Guest	Guest	Starring (Note: Added to the opening credits from episode four onwards.)			Guest (Note: Appears in the Love & Hip Hop Awards: Most Certified and 40 Greatest Love & Hip Hop Moments: The Reboot specials only.)									
Traci Steele		Starring		Cameo													
Tammy Rivera			Starring	Supporting	Starring	Starring	Guest										
Stevie J	Supporting	Supporting	Supporting	Starring	Starring	Starring	Starring	Starring	Starring								
Tommie Lee	Cameo				Supporting	Starring	Starring	Cameo									
Jessica Dime				Supporting	Supporting	Supporting	Starring										
Erica Mena							Starring	Guest (Note: Appears in the 40 Greatest Love & Hip Hop Moments: The Reboot special only.)	Supporting	Starring	Starring	Starring					
Spice						Guest	Supporting	Starring	Starring	Starring	Starring	Starring	Starring	Starring	Starring	Starring	Starring
Yung Joc			Supporting	Supporting	Supporting	Supporting	Supporting	Starring	Starring	Supporting	Starring	Supporting	Supporting	Starring	Starring	Starring	Starring
Scrapp DeLeon			Cameo		Supporting	Guest (Note: As Scrapp was incarcerated during the filming of these seasons, he makes only minor appearances via phone call conversations.)	Guest	Starring	Starring								
Lil Scrappy	Supporting	Supporting	Supporting	Supporting	Supporting	Supporting	Supporting	Supporting	Starring	Supporting	Starring	Supporting	Supporting	Starring	Starring	Starring	Starring
Sierra Gates						Supporting	Supporting	Supporting	Starring	Starring	Starring	Starring	Starring	Starring	Starring	Starring	Supporting
Kirk Frost	Supporting	Supporting	Supporting	Supporting	Supporting	Supporting	Supporting	Supporting	Supporting	Starring	Starring	Supporting	Supporting	Supporting	Starring	Starring	Starring
Yung Baby Tate										Starring							
Safaree Samuels								Guest	Supporting	Starring	Starring	Supporting					
Omeretta the Great										Starring							
Yandy Smith-Harris								Guest		Starring	Starring	Starring	Starring	Supporting	Supporting	Supporting	Starring
Mendeecees Harris										Starring	Starring	Supporting	Supporting	Supporting	Supporting	Supporting	Supporting
Kendra Robinson								Supporting	Supporting	Guest	Starring	Supporting	Supporting	Supporting	Supporting	Supporting	Supporting
Bambi Benson		Guest	Supporting	Supporting	Supporting	Supporting	Supporting	Supporting	Supporting	Supporting	Starring	Starring	Starring	Starring	Starring	Starring	Supporting
Erica Banks												Starring	Starring	Supporting	Supporting	Starring	Supporting
Amy Luciani												Starring	Starring	Supporting	Supporting	Supporting	Supporting
Jessica White												Starring	Starring	Supporting	Supporting	Supporting	Supporting
Saucy Santana													Supporting	Starring	Starring	Supporting	Supporting

=== Storylines ===
Love & Hip Hop: Atlanta chronicles the relationship struggles of women and men in the hip hop industry, with infidelity being the most common theme. The dysfunctional love triangle between Stevie J, Mimi Faust and Joseline Hernandez has been the focal point of the show since its inception and its most widely publicised storyline, with the "main chick vs side chick" rivalry being recreated and explored with other cast members on the show and in the franchise.

Many of the show's cast members come from broken homes, which has led to criticism by those who find the show exploitive. Several episodes in the first season document Stevie, Mimi and Joseline taking part in sessions with a therapist, revealing their troubled upbringings. Stevie and Mimi were both abandoned by their mothers at an early age, in Mimi's case, she was abandoned at the age of 13 for Scientology. Joseline also had a difficult relationship with her parents growing up within the public housing system of Puerto Rico, being exposed to drugs and prostitution at an early age, in order to take her of her family Other cast members come from backgrounds that reflect the economical realities of Atlanta's poorest communities, Erica's mother is a recovering crack cocaine addict, while Scrappy's mother became a pimp in order to provide for her family. Several of the show's female cast members have worked as strippers out of financial desperation, with music being depicted as an escape from that lifestyle.

The show has explored many controversial issues over the seasons. In an early episode, Joseline discovers she is pregnant and decides to have an abortion. In another episode, K. Michelle reveals her experience with domestic violence. Several cast members have dealt with substance abuse and addiction, with Scrappy going to rehab in season two for marijuana addiction, Stevie J going to rehab in season four for cocaine addiction and Tommie dealing with alcohol abuse in seasons five, six and seven. Infidelity is also a major theme on the show, the second season controversially depicts Kirk Frost cheating on his wife Rasheeda on camera, years later he would father a child outside of their marriage with co-star Jasmine Washington.

Many of the female cast members identify as bisexual, lesbian or sexually fluid, and the show is one of the few television shows to explore LGBT issues from a black perspective. Season five features two trans cast members, D. Smith and Chris Gould, and several episodes featured public service announcements aimed to help viewers struggling with their gender identity. Season 11 features the first openly gay male cast member, rapper Saucy Santana.

== Episodes ==
Season	Episodes		Originally released	
Season	Episodes		First released	Last released
1	12		June 18, 2012	September 3, 2012
2	17		April 22, 2013	August 12, 2013
3	20		May 5, 2014	September 8, 2014
4	19		April 20, 2015	August 31, 2015
5	18		April 4, 2016	August 8, 2016
6	18		March 6, 2017	July 17, 2017
7	18		March 19, 2018	July 16, 2018
8	20		March 25, 2019	July 29, 2019
9	9		March 16, 2020	May 11, 2020
10	29	13	July 5, 2021	September 27, 2021
10	29	16	August 8, 2022	November 21, 2022
11	31	15	June 13, 2023	September 26, 2023
11	31	16	January 9, 2024	April 23, 2024
12	31	14	July 23, 2024	October 22, 2024
12	31	17	January 7, 2025	April 29, 2025
13	29	15	July 8, 2025	October 14, 2025
13	29	14	February 17, 2026	May 19, 2026

== Development ==
Rumors of an Atlanta-based spin-off of Love & Hip Hop began circulating in December 2011. Stefan Springman revealed in the behind-the-scenes special Love & Hip Hop Atlanta: Dirty Little Secrets that producers first considered Love & Hip Hop spin-off set in Miami before settling on Atlanta instead, saying that "we found great characters (in Miami) but it just didn't feel right". During the casting process, several names were reported as part of the original cast, including Diamond, Rasheeda, Nivea and CeeLo Green's ex-wife Christina Johnson. Diamond was planned to be the lead of the show, with a source saying "Diamond would definitely be the Chrissy (Lampkin) of the group". Nivea eventually turned the show down, and producers approached Nas's daughter Destiny Jones and her mother Carmen Bryan. They interviewed with producers, but backed out after feeling they didn't fit in with the other cast members. Shawty Lo and his wife Ecreia Perez were cast but dropped from the show, with Shawty later admitting in interviews that VH1 had a problem with the couple's extensive criminal record. 2 Chainz was also approached but turned it down.

On February 6, 2012, during the finale of Love & Hip Hop's second season, series creator Mona Scott-Young officially announced that the show, then titled Love & Hip Hop: Hotlanta, was in production. Casting rumors intensified, with Ms. Rici, known as Yung Joc's assistant and former mistress, and Waka Flocka Flame's mom and manager Deb Antney reportedly joining the cast. The casting of Rici, who was planned to be the "Yandy" of the group, was controversial as she had a long criminal history having been arrested for theft, assault and resisting arrest, amongst other things. Rici backed out of the show days before filming, after discovering producers had planned to air a storyline involving her, Yung Joc and his wife. By March, the cast was finalised and filming began. A few weeks into filming, Diamond broke her contract and officially quit the show, telling producers that she had "spoken to God" and he told her "it was the best thing to do". She was replaced by K. Michelle.

On May 15, 2012, VH1 announced Love & Hip Hop: Atlanta would make its series premiere on June 18, 2012.

== Reception ==
=== Critical response ===
Love & Hip Hop: Atlanta has largely been overshadowed by criticism and controversy, with the franchise referred to as "ratchet TV" for its seemingly negative and stereotypical portrayal of black people and its focus on dysfunctional relationships, materialism, hyper-sexuality and violence. The show premiered in 2012 to a storm of controversy, with some viewers calling for a boycott. One petition described the show as "another beautifully-blinged jewel of commercial exploitation" and compared it to the crack epidemic of the 1980s in its potentially damaging and long-lasting impact on African-American culture. Series creator Mona Scott-Young has been singled out in particular for allegedly "exploiting (black people) in her quest for the almighty dollar". Scott-Young has continuously defended the show against these accusations, saying the show was not created to represent all African-Americans: "It's set in a specific world and I don’t think that there's anybody who's navigated that world who would deny that these things happen."

Despite the criticism, the franchise has dominated the ratings since its inception, and has been described as "riveting", "addictive" "bawdy and hilarious" and a "guilty pleasure". In 2014, Complex named Joseline Hernandez, Stevie J, K. Michelle, Momma Dee and Shay Johnson as some of the greatest VH1 reality stars of all time.

=== Scripting allegations ===
Love & Hip Hop: Atlanta is often criticized for appearing to fabricate much of its storyline. Scott-Young has denied those claims: “I can’t stress enough that the stuff they deal with on (Love & Hip Hop) is real. We may frame it within a production construct that allows us to shoot on a schedule, but we’re not making up the stuff that they’re going through.” She has admitted however that the show stages reactions of past events. During a legal battle with co-star Althea Heart, Joseline Hernandez testified under oath in 2014 that the show was not an accurate portrayal of the cast's real life, stating "there's a lot of acting in the reality world".

In 2015, Mimi Faust admitted that her "leaked" sex tape storyline was staged from the very beginning. In October 2015, boxer Adrien Broner stormed off set after allegedly being asked by producers to contrive a romantic scene with Karlie Redd. Since 2013, Rasheeda and Kirk Frost have regularly been criticised and accused of fabricating their storylines to stay on the show.

=== Ratings ===
Love & Hip Hop: Atlanta is the highest-rated installment of the Love & Hip Hop franchise, which is itself one of the highest-rated franchises in cable television history. In an overview of the television cultural divide, The New York Times reported that Love & Hip Hop was the most popular show in the black belt.

After its premiere, the show's audience grew substantially over the season. The show's finale garnered 5.5 million people overall, cementing its status as the highest rated show in primetime on cable among adults 18-49. The third season was a huge ratings success, with the series premiere having a combined rating of 5.6 million viewers and continuing to set ratings records throughout the season. The fourth series premiere garnered big ratings for the network, with VH1 announcing a combined rating of 6.2 million viewers. On August 19, 2015, VH1 announced the season as the summer's #1 cable reality series among adults 18-49 and women 18-49 and the 2nd most talked-about television series on social media overall. The sixth series premiere garnered big ratings for the network, with VH1 announcing a combined rating of 5.2 million viewers, up 17% from its fifth season bow. However, ratings began to decline by season seven, with its premiere episode down over a million viewers compared to the previous season.

=== Cultural impact ===
During a speech at a campaign rally in North Carolina on November 4, 2016, President Barack Obama referenced the show, comparing the 2016 presidential race to reality television, saying "I mean, it's like some Love & Hip Hop stuff."

Lee Daniels is a fan of Love & Hip Hop: Atlanta and his 2016 Fox television series Star (set in Atlanta) makes several references to the show. Joseline Hernandez appears in the first season in a recurring role as Michelle, a stripper. In the second episode, Lenny Kravitz's character is seen watching a scene of the show featuring Mimi Faust and Stevie J. In a later scene in the same episode, Jessica Dime makes a cameo appearance as a stripper. In later seasons, Stevie J and Mimi Faust would appear as DJ Dash and Drea respectively. Additionally, Star cast member Jasmine Burke guest starred in Love & Hip Hop: Atlanta's sixth season as herself.

== Broadcast history ==
On April 1, 2013, VH1 announced that Love & Hip Hop: Atlanta would be returning for a second season on April 22, 2013.

On April 14, 2014, VH1 announced that Love & Hip Hop: Atlanta would be returning for a third season on May 5, 2014.

On April 9, 2015, VH1 announced that Love & Hip Hop: Atlanta would be returning for a fourth season on April 20, 2015, and would premiere alongside Love & Hip Hop Atlanta: The Afterparty Live!, a half an hour long interactive after-show hosted by Big Tigger.

On March 8, 2016, VH1 announced that Love & Hip Hop: Atlanta would be returning for a fifth season on April 4, 2016.

On February 21, 2017, VH1 announced that Love & Hip Hop: Atlanta would be returning for a sixth season on March 6, 2017. With this season, Love & Hip Hop: Atlanta became the first incarnation of the franchise to reach 100 episodes.

On February 16, 2018, VH1 announced that Love & Hip Hop: Atlanta would be returning for a seventh season on March 19, 2018.

On February 25, 2019, VH1 announced that Love & Hip Hop: Atlanta would be returning for an eighth season on March 25, 2019.

On February 17, 2020, VH1 announced that Love & Hip Hop: Atlanta would be returning for a ninth season on March 16, 2020.

On June 7, 2021, VH1 announced that Love & Hip Hop: Atlanta would be returning for a tenth season on July 5, 2021. A year later, on July 11, 2022, VH1 announced that additional episodes of season ten would air from August 8, 2022.

=== Spin-offs ===
On October 15, 2014, VH1 announced the spin-off K. Michelle: My Life, starring cast member K. Michelle, would make its series premiere on November 3, 2014.

On August 27, 2015, VH1 confirmed that Stevie J and Joseline Hernandez would star in their own spin-off series, set in Los Angeles. On December 2, 2015, VH1 announced Stevie J & Joseline: Go Hollywood, which premiered January 25, 2016, back-to-back with the second season of K. Michelle: My Life.

On December 1, 2016, VH1 announced the spin-off Leave It to Stevie, starring Stevie J, would make its series premiere on December 19, 2016, back-to-back with the third season of K. Michelle: My Life.

=== Specials ===
On December 16, 2012, VH1 aired Dirty Little Secrets, a special featuring unseen footage, deleted scenes and interviews with the show's cast and producers. The special garnered 1.22 million viewers.

On April 19, 2017, VH1 announced that Joseline's Special Delivery, a special documenting the birth of Joseline's child, would air between the season's eighth and ninth episodes on May 1, 2017. It premiered to 2.18 million viewers. Additionally, Dirty Little Secrets 2, a special featuring unseen footage and deleted scenes from the show's second season up until season five, aired on May 10, 2017, to over 1 million viewers.

== Distribution ==
Love & Hip Hop: Atlanta episodes air regularly on VH1 in the United States. Episodes run from around 41–44 minutes and are broadcast in high definition. The series' episodes are also available on demand through the official VH1 website, as well as for digital download at the iTunes Store and Amazon.

VH1 have released the first two seasons, as well as the fourth season, on DVD. The third, fifth, sixth, seventh, and eighth seasons are currently only available on digital platforms.
