= Mimi Faust =

American television personality (born 1972)

- Mimi Faust in 2022
- Born: Oluremi Fela James; January 3, 1972 (age 54); Newport News, Virginia, U.S.
- Years active: 1999–present
- Known for: Love & Hip Hop: Atlanta
- Partner(s): Stevie J (1997–2012); Tamera Young (2016–2022)
- Children: 1

Oluremi Fela Faust (née James) (born January 3, 1972), known professionally as Mimi Faust, is an American reality television personality who stars on the VH1 program Love & Hip Hop: Atlanta. She first appeared as the long-time girlfriend of producer Stevie J.

== Early life ==
Born Oluremi Fela James, she was reared by a mother active in Scientology. In a sit-down special with Egypt Sherrod in 2014, Faust discussed being abandoned by her mother for the sake of the church. She stated of the church "They put me out at 13. They actually came to me and said I was a freeloader because I ate their food and slept there and I wasn't indeed working for them." Faust did not meet her biological father until she was sixteen years old. In fact, her birth was the result of an affair; Faust grew up believing that another man was her birth father. She would go on to take her biological father's last name after developing a relationship with him. Her father later died in 2014.

== Career ==
In 1999–2003, Faust appeared in the music videos for singers Kelly Price' single "It's Gonna Rain" and Pharrell Williams' single "Frontin'", which featured the rapper Jay-Z. Actress Lauren London and model Lanisha Cole were also featured in the video. Faust later established the Keep It Clean Inc. cleaning service in the Stone Mountain area of Atlanta.

In 2012, Faust joined the cast of the VH1 spin-off show of Love & Hip Hop titled Love & Hip Hop: Atlanta. She was cast with the father of her daughter, Stevie J; singer K. Michelle; rapper Rasheeda, musician/actress Karlie Redd; and rapper Joseline Hernandez. Faust's friend Ariane Davis also was cast in a recurring role on the show. The program showcased her relationship with Stevie J and the pair's daughter Eva. It also depicted the love triangle between the couple and castmate Joseline Hernandez.

Faust is managed by Sandy Lal. Sandy Lal is also Faust's entertainment lawyer. In 2017, Faust appeared on the television show Leah Remini: Scientology and the Aftermath, where she spoke in-depth on how she was abandoned by her mother after refusing to sign a contract with the organization.

== 2014 sex tape ==
In 2014, a sex tape entitled Scandal in Atlanta, featuring Faust and then-boyfriend Londell Smith (a.k.a. Nikko London), was released through Vivid Entertainment. It has become one of the most popular sex tapes released by the pornography company. It was nominated for an AVN award for best celebrity sex tape in 2015, losing out to Tila Tequila. The category included Teen Mom star Farrah Abraham. Faust and Smith had stated that their luggage containing the sex tape was stolen and the tape was sent to Vivid Entertainment through an anonymous source. After scrutiny by the public and those close to her, such as friend and castmate Ariane Davis, Faust admitted that the tape had been staged. Faust allegedly made upwards of $100,000 from the sales of the sex tape.

== Filmography ==
=== Television ===
Year	Show Title	Role	Notes
2012–2022	Love & Hip Hop: Atlanta	Herself	Main cast (Seasons 1-9) Supporting (Season 10b) Guest (Season 10a)
2017	Leah Remini: Scientology and the Aftermath	Herself	Special guest Star
2016	Stevie J & Joseline: Go Hollywood	Herself	Guest
2016-2018	Leave It to Stevie	Herself	Supporting
2018	Star	Herself	Guest
2021-2022	VH1 Family Reunion: Love & Hip Hop Edition	Herself	Main cast (Season 2)
