= Alexis Skyy =

American reality television personality (born 1994)

- Born: Anastasia Nicole McFarland; 14 July 1994 (age 32); New York, U.S.
- Occupation: Reality television personality
- Children: 1

Anastasia Nicole McFarland (born July 14, 1994), better known by her stage name Alexis Skyy, is an American reality television personality. She is best known from being on VH1's reality TV shows Love & Hip Hop: Hollywood, Love & Hip Hop: New York and Love & Hip Hop: Atlanta. Skyy has received media attention for her relationship with rapper Fetty Wap.

== Early life ==
Skyy was born in Long Island City, New York, to Jamaican parents, and grew up in Wyandanch. She was raised by her mother and grandmother alongside her brothers, and was kidnapped and forced into human trafficking at age 15. At age 18, Skyy met her biological father.

== Career ==
In July 2017, Skyy joined the cast of Love & Hip Hop: Hollywood to co-star with Ray J, Keyshia Cole, and Teairra Mari.

== Personal life ==
Skyy had a two-year relationship with Fetty Wap, which ended in 2016. Their sex tape was leaked after they broke up. She has one child who was successfully treated for hydrocephalus. In 2019, she dated Rob Kardashian.
