= Karlie Redd =

American television personality

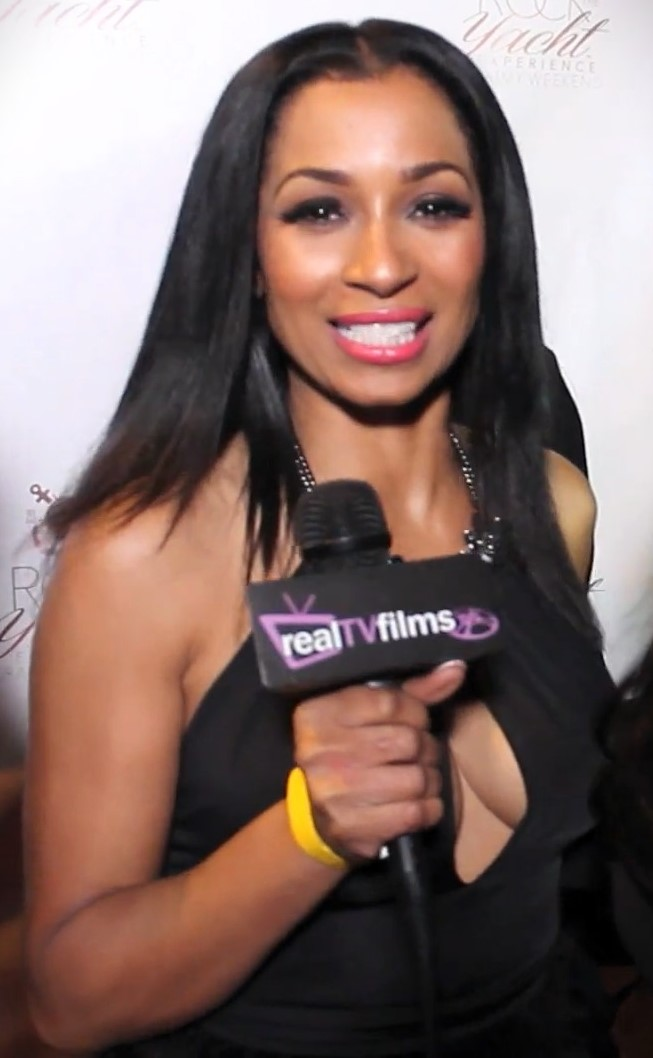
- Redd in 2016
- Born: Karlie Lewis; April 15; New York City, New York, U.S.
- Education: The Harlem School of the Arts
- Occupations: Television personality; rapper; actress; model
- Years active: 2000–present
- Children: 1
- Musical career
- Genre: Hip-hop
- Instrument: Vocals
- Website: karlieredd.com

Karlie "Keisha" Redd (née Lewis; born April 15) is an American television personality, rapper, model and actress. She rose to prominence for appearing as a main cast member of VH1's reality show Love & Hip Hop: Atlanta since its premiere in June 2012.

== Early life ==
Karlie (sometimes reported as "Keisha") Lewis was born in New York City to a Trinidadian mother and African-American father. Redd's birthday is April 15, but her year of birth is disputed. Redd spent her childhood between Trinidad and New York until returning to New York permanently at age 12. For education, Redd attended The Harlem School of the Arts and Alvin Ailey American Dance Theater. Redd is a college graduate.

== Career ==
In 2001, Redd was cast in the movie Black Spring Break 2 where she was credited as Keisha "Karlie" Lewis. In 2010, Redd was in the VH1 reality show Scream Queens. In 2012, she was cast in the spin-off VH1 reality show, Love & Hip Hop: Atlanta. Redd has dated hip hop artists Benzino and Yung Joc on the show. According to an analysis done by a language analytics company, Redd's appearances on the fifth season of the show garnered 16% of all emotional reactions about the show collected from social media data, with the largest share of them being negative.

Redd's first role in a box office film was in the Chris Rock movie Top Five in 2014. She formerly played a recurring role on the soap opera Saints and Sinners, which appeared on Bounce TV.

In July 2012, Redd released her debut single, "A Girl Has Needs", on iTunes. In October 2018, she announced an upcoming musical project called "Karlie Ferrari" which may be released as an EP.

=== Business ventures ===
In the summer of 2012, Redd launched the Redd Remy Hairline. She opened a women's clothing store called Merci Boutique in 2015 in Atlanta, Georgia.

== Personal life ==
She has a daughter named Jasmine who has appeared on Love & Hip Hop: Atlanta.

Redd announced her engagement in October 2018.

Redd's birthday is April 15, and her birth year is estimated to be between 1969 and 1978. In 2012, Redd stated that she was "in her twenties" but would not reveal her birth year. Her age has been disputed by Love & Hip Hop: Atlanta co-star K. Michelle and Redd's ex-boyfriend and fellow co-star Benzino, Yung Joc, Scrapp DeLeon, Lyfe Jennings and Ceaser from Black Ink Crew, who have said she is older than she claims. Redd has an adult daughter, Jasmine, who was in college in 2015 and has appeared on Love & Hip Hop: Atlanta. In a 2015 Playboy Plus spread, Redd listed her age as 37, putting her birth year at 1978. On May 20, 2019, in an interview with The Real, Redd stated her age to be 45.

== Filmography ==
=== Films ===
Year	Title	Role	Notes
2000	How to Marry a Billionaire: A Christmas Tale	Kerry	TV movie
2001	Black Spring Break 2	-	Video
2010	Hip-Hop Headstrong	Sexy Girl	Short
2014	Top Five	Rhonda	
2014	30 Days in Atlanta	Kimberly	
2016	My Side Piece	Susan	
2017	We Are Family	Zantria	
2018	Juug Gone Wrong	Lisa	
2018	Coins for Christmas	Female Guest	TV movie
2019	I Left My Girlfriend for Regina Jones	Tina	
2020	Stolen Lilies	Nancy	
2020	Pinch	Mrs. Ramirez	
2021	Stick Me Up	Detective Greenwood	
2022	No Better Love	Principal Janet Palmer	
2023	Love & Murder: Atlanta Playboy	Careesha	
2025	Happy Anniversary	Shelly Stevens	

=== Television ===
Year	Title	Role	Notes
2000	18 Wheels of Justice	Cindy Kinsey	Episode: "The Road to Hell"
2001	Kate Brasher	Child Services Official	Episode: "Simon"
2001	18 Wheels of Justice	Receptionist	Episode: "The Cage"
2008	Sex Chronicles	800 Woman #2	Episode: "The Big Screaming O"
2010	Scream Queens	Herself/Contestant	Contestant: Season 2
2012	Totally Packaged	Herself/Guest Judge	Recurring Guest Judge
2012–26	Love & Hip Hop: Atlanta	Herself	Main Cast: Season 1-9 & 12b-13b, Recurring Cast: Season 10a-11b
2013–14	Love & Hip Hop Atlanta: Check Yourself	Herself	Main Cast
2014–16	K. Michelle: My Life	Herself	Guest Cast: Season 1–2
2015–20	Love & Hip Hop	Herself	Guest Cast: Season 5 & 8 & 10
2016–22	Saints & Sinners	Paige Morris	Recurring Cast: Season 1-3 & 5–6
2017	Hip Hop Squares	Herself/Contestant	Episode: "Stevie J vs Karlie Redd"
2017	Fantasy Flirt	Herself	Episode: "Episode #1.4"
2018	Wild 'n Out	Herself	Episode: "Affion Crockett/Karlie Redd/Vic Mensa"
2019	Last Call	Vicki	Episode: "Loose Lips"
2019	Love & Hip Hop: Hollywood	Herself	Episode: "With Friends Like These"
2021	Love & Hip Hop: Secrets Unlocked	Herself	Recurring Cast
2021–23	VH1 Family Reunion: Love & Hip Hop Edition	Herself	Main Cast: Season 1 & 3

=== Music Video ===
Year	Artist	Song	Notes
2001	Lucyfire	"The Pain Song"	
