= Mona Scott-Young =

American media executive

- Born: Mona Scott; February 15, 1967 (age 59); New York City, U.S.
- Occupations: Media mogul; television producer; entrepreneur
- Years active: 2005–present
- Known for: Love & Hip Hop; Violator Management
- Spouse: Shawn Young (m. 2005)
- Children: 2
- Website: monamient.com

Mona Scott-Young (née Scott; born February 15, 1967) is an American television producer and entrepreneur. She is the CEO of the multi-media entertainment company Monami Productions, best known for producing the VH1 reality television franchise Love & Hip Hop.

== Life and career ==
Scott was born and raised in New York City to Haitian parents. In 2005, she married Shawn Young. They have two children.

=== Violator ===
While working at Radio City Music Hall, Scott-Young was approached by the Brooklyn group TrackMasters to come on board as their manager. Through them, she met music executive Chris Lighty and, in 1996, the two co-founded the management company Violator. Over the course of twenty years, Violator helped launch and revamp the careers of artists such as Busta Rhymes, LL Cool J, Q-Tip, Foxy Brown, Ja Rule, Mobb Deep, 50 Cent, Mariah Carey, Fantasia and Missy Elliott, who she still manages today.

=== Television ===
Scott-Young transitioned into television in 2005, producing The Road to Stardom with Missy Elliott on UPN and creating her own television production company, Monami Productions. In 2006, Jim Ackerman, a director at VH1 at the time, approached her to help develop a reality television series which centered on rapper Jim Jones. Inspired by female ensemble-driven shows that were popular at the time, Scott-Young shifted the concept to focus on Jim's girlfriend Chrissy Lampkin and her circle of friends. The series, now known as Love & Hip Hop, went on to become a huge success.

Scott-Young sees the Love & Hip Hop brand as an opportunity maker. "To have a franchise that represents our culture, our people and to have that kind of staying power and the ability to invent and reinvent as we expand into different cities to me that's probably what I'm proudest of. [It's] the ability to provide the jobs both in front of and behind the scenes... to women and people of color as well.".

The show spawned a media franchise that included the spin-offs Love & Hip Hop: Atlanta, Love & Hip Hop: Hollywood, Love & Hip Hop: Miami, Chrissy & Mr. Jones, K. Michelle: My Life, Stevie J & Joseline: Go Hollywood and Leave It to Stevie. In addition to the Love & Hip Hop franchise, Monami Productions has produced Donald Trump Presents: The Ultimate Merger for TV One, Cocaine: History Between the Lines for the History Channel, The Gossip Game and This Is Hot 97 for VH1, The New Atlanta for Bravo and Money. Power. Respect. for WE tv.

In addition to television, Scott-Young is part owner and chief marketing officer of the moscato brand MYX Fusions with rapper Nicki Minaj, and serves on the board of The Haitian Roundtable, The RSQ Foundation and The GrassROOTS Foundation.

== Awards and accolades ==
Scott-Young has been honored at ASCAP's "Woman Behind the Music" event in 2011. She has been honored with awards from the National Association of Black Female Executives in Music Entertainment, named "Marketer of the Year" by Ad Age, and recognized by the National Congress and Convention of Haitian-Americans. Scott-Young was awarded at the MTV Movie & TV Awards for "Reality TV Royalty".

== Filmography ==
=== Television ===
Year	Series	Role	Network	Notes
2005	The Road to Stardom with Missy Elliott	Executive producer	UPN	* Also appeared as a judge.
2010	Donald Trump Presents: The Ultimate Merger	Consulting producer	TV One	
2011	Cocaine: History Between the Lines	Executive producer	History Channel	
2011–2020	Love & Hip Hop: New York	Executive producer	VH1	* Also made appearances as herself and hosted the second and third season reunion specials.
2012	Love & Hip Hop: Reality Check	Executive producer	VH1	* Also appeared as host.
2012–2026	Love & Hip Hop: Atlanta	Executive producer	VH1	* Also hosted the first and second season reunion specials.
2012	Love & Hip Hop Atlanta: Dirty Little Secrets	Executive producer	VH1	* Also appeared as host.
2012–2013	Chrissy & Mr. Jones	Executive producer	VH1	
2013	The Gossip Game	Executive producer	VH1	
2013	The New Atlanta	Executive producer	Bravo	
2013	40 Greatest Love & Hip Hop Moments	Executive producer	VH1	* Also appeared as host.
2014	This Is Hot 97	Executive producer	VH1	
2014–2019	Love & Hip Hop: Hollywood	Executive producer	VH1	* Also hosted the first season reunion special.
2014–2017	K. Michelle: My Life	Executive producer	VH1	
2015	Love & Hip Hop Atlanta: After Party Live	Executive producer	VH1	
2015	Love & Hip Hop Live: The Wedding	Executive producer	VH1	* Also appeared as herself.
2015	Love & Hip Hop: Out in Hip Hop	Executive producer	VH1	
2016	Stevie J & Joseline: Go Hollywood	Executive producer	VH1	
2016	Money. Power. Respect.	Executive producer	WE tv	
2016–2018	Leave It To Stevie	Executive producer	VH1	
2016	Hip Hop Honors	Executive producer	VH1	
2017	Hip Hop Honors: 90s Game Changers	Executive producer	VH1	
2017	Love & Hip Hop: Joseline's Special Delivery	Executive producer	VH1	
2017	Xscape: Still Kickin' It	Executive producer	Bravo	
2018–2026	Love & Hip Hop: Miami	Executive producer	VH1	
2020	Tommie Sh*t	Executive producer	Zeus Network	
2020	Tamar Braxton: Get Ya Life!	Executive producer	WE tv	
