= Stevie J =

American DJ, record producer, and television personality

- Born: Steven Aaron Jordan; November 2, 1971 (age 54); Utica, New York, U.S.
- Occupations: Disc jockey; record producer; songwriter; television personality; television producer
- Years active: 1992–present
- Television: Love & Hip Hop: Atlanta; Stevie J & Joseline Go Hollywood; Leave It to Stevie
- Spouse: Faith Evans (m. 2018; div. 2023)
- Partner(s): Mimi Faust (1997–2012); Joseline Hernandez (2011–2016)
- Children: 6
- Musical career
- Genres: Hip hop; R&B
- Labels: Music Access; Bad Boy; DangerZone
- Member of: The Hitmen; Swing Mob

Steven Aaron Jordan (born November 2, 1971) is an American DJ, record producer, and television personality. As part of the Bad Boy Records production team the Hitmen, Jordan won a Grammy Award for his work on Puff Daddy's debut album No Way Out (1997). Throughout the late 1990s, Jordan produced for a number of artists including Mariah Carey, Tevin Campbell, The Notorious B.I.G., 112, Jodeci, Faith Evans, Jay-Z, and Eve.

== Early life ==
Steven Aaron Jordan was born on November 2, 1971, in Utica, New York, to Moses Jordan and Penny Daniels. He was raised in Buffalo, New York, and Rochester, New York, by his father after his mother abandoned the family.

== Career ==
Jordan first rose to fame as a member of Bad Boy Records' "Hitmen" roster of in-house producers and writers during the 1990s. He worked often with label owner Sean "Puffy" Combs, producing on several Bad Boy projects, such as the self-titled debut album of R&B quartet 112. Jordan produced their lead single "Only You" featuring The Notorious B.I.G. Jordan produced several records on Notorious B.I.G.'s Life After Death album, such as "Mo Money Mo Problems", "Nasty Boy", "Notorious Thugs" (featuring Bone Thugs-n-Harmony), "Another", "You're Nobody (Til Somebody Kills You)", and "Last Day". Jordan went on to win a Grammy Award for production work on Combs' No Way Out album, most notably the Notorious B.I.G. tribute song, I'll Be Missing You. Outside of his association with Bad Boy, he has also produced for artists including Mariah Carey, with whom he was nominated for a Grammy Award for the contribution on her album Butterfly (1997). From the album, he produced songs like "Honey" (the album's lead single), "Breakdown" (featuring Bone Thugs-n-Harmony), "Babydoll", and for Carey's #1's (1998) "I Still Believe" and "Theme from Mahogany (Do You Know Where You're Going To)". In the summer of 1997, three of the aforementioned Stevie J-produced records (I'll Be Missing You, Mo Money Mo Problems, and Honey) topped the Billboard Hot 100 consecutively from the chart weeks of June 14 through September 27, 1997. He has also produced for Beyoncé, Jay-Z, Brian McKnight, Ma$e, Lil' Kim, Deborah Cox, Simbi Khali, Tamia and Tevin Campbell. Jordan also co-wrote the 2001 hit single "Let Me Blow Ya Mind" for Eve.

Prior to joining Bad Boy Records, Stevie J often performed with Jodeci as one of their live musicians, playing the bass guitar. Stevie also appeared on their 1995 album The Show, the After Party, the Hotel. Jordan was a member of Swing Mob, a Rochester, New York–based record label and music compound founded by Jodeci member DeVante Swing. After Swing Mob folded and Jordan signed with Bad Boy, he continued a working relationship with Swing's younger brother and fellow Jodeci member Dalvin DeGrate, producing and singing on DeGrate's solo debut album, Met.A.Mor.Phic (2000).

In 2012, Stevie J began appearing as a primary cast member of the VH1 reality TV series, Love & Hip Hop: Atlanta, which featured him involved in a love triangle involving his then-girlfriend, Mimi Faust, and new girlfriend, Puerto Rican rapper, Joseline Hernandez. It was alleged that Stevie and Joseline Hernandez were married, but later revealed that they were actually not legally married.

Since the show premiered in 2012, Jordan and Hernandez have become a popular couple in the hip-hop world, making cameo appearances in music videos such as former labelmate Faith Evans' "I Deserve It", featuring Missy Elliott and Sharaya J, and Trey Songz's Hail Mary, featuring Young Jeezy and Lil Wayne. In 2016, Jordan announced that he will be producing and starring in a movie "That Time of the Month" which is set to be released by the end of the year.

== Personal life ==
Jordan has been previously romantically linked to Mimi Faust, Joseline Hernandez, Eve and Alex Martin. He has six children:

- with Rhonda Henderson, son Dorian Henderson-Jordan (born 1995)
- with Felicia Stover, daughter Sade Jordan (born 1995)
- with Carol Antoinette Bennett, son Steven Jordan Jr. (born 1997) and daughter Savannah Jordan (born 1998)
- with Mimi Faust, daughter Eva Giselle Jordan (born 2009)
- with Joseline Hernandez, daughter Bonnie Bella Hernandez (born December 28, 2016)

He also has a grandson, Zion, from his eldest son, Dorian.

Jordan married Faith Evans, whom he had known and been friends with for over 25 years, in 2018. He filed for divorce from Evans in 2021. The divorce was finalized in July 2023.

== Legal issues ==
On February 1, 2017, Jordan was sentenced to three years of probation and ordered to pay $1,304,835 in restitution for non-payment of child support obligations.

== Filmography ==
=== Television ===
Year	Title	Role	Notes
2012–2020	Love & Hip Hop: Atlanta	Himself	Supporting (seasons 1–3); Main cast (seasons 4–9)
2013; 2014	BET Hip Hop Awards	Himself	Pre-show host
2014	This Is Hot 97	Himself	Guest
2015	Love & Hip Hop Live: The Wedding	Himself	Host
2016	Stevie J & Joseline: Go Hollywood	Himself	Main cast Executive producer
2016–2018	Leave It to Stevie	Himself	Main cast Executive producer
2017	Joseline's Special Delivery	Himself	Guest
2018	Star	DJ Dash	Guest
2019	Black Jesus	Tiny Baseball	Guest
2021–present	Growing Up Hip Hop	Himself	Supporting cast (season 6); Executive producer
2022	Black Ink Crew: Compton	Himself	Episode: Black Ink Crewtopia
2023	Baddies West	Himself	Reunion host
