= Love & Hip Hop: Atlanta season 5 =

Love & Hip Hop: Atlanta
- Season 5
- Cover used by the iTunes Store
- Starring: Mimi Faust; Rasheeda; Karlie Redd; Tammy Rivera; K. Michelle; Joseline Hernandez; Stevie J
- No. of episodes: 18

Release
- Original network: VH1
- Original release: April 4 – August 8, 2016

Season chronology
- ← Previous; Season 4 Next → Season 6

The fifth season of the reality television series Love & Hip Hop: Atlanta aired on VH1 from April 4, 2016, until August 8, 2016. The season was primarily filmed in Atlanta, Georgia. It was executively produced by Mona Scott-Young and Stephanie R. Gayle for Monami Entertainment, Toby Barraud, Stefan Springman, Mala Chapple, David DiGangi, Lashan Browning and Donna Edge-Rachell for Eastern TV, and Nina L. Diaz and Vivian Gomez for VH1.

The series chronicles the lives of several women and men in the Atlanta area, involved in hip hop music. It consists of 18 episodes, including Exposed and Unfiltered, a two-part reunion special hosted by Nina Parker.

== Production ==
The cast of the fifth season (minus Stevie J), from left to right: Karlie, K. Michelle, Joseline, Mimi, Rasheeda and Tammy.

The fifth season title screen.

On March 8, 2016, VH1 announced that Love & Hip Hop: Atlanta would be returning for a fifth season on April 4, 2016. A 5-minute long "super-trailer" was released on March 28, 2016. This season featured an entirely new opening credits sequence. With the exception of Erica Dixon, who quit the show, all main cast members from the previous season returned. Tammy Rivera returned to the main cast after a season's absence, along with original cast member K. Michelle, who returned from the fourth episode "Blackmail". Although credited in every episode after that, Michelle appeared infrequently with no major storylines and barely interacted with the rest of the cast. Lyfe Jennings and Rasheeda's mother Shirleen Harvell joined the supporting cast, along with "momager" Karen "KK" King, her son Scrapp DeLeon, Scrapp's girlfriend Tommie Lee, his baby mama Tiarra Becca, Mimi's partner Chris Gould, Grammy Award-winning songwriter D. Smith and her best friend Betty Idol. Kirk's daughter Kelsie Frost, Scrapp's brother Sas, radio personality J-Nicks and stripper Amber Priddy appeared in minor supporting roles.

D. Smith became the first openly transgender castmate in the show's history. Gould would reveal his identity as a trans man in an episode near the end of season. Several episodes featured public service announcements aimed to help viewers struggling with their gender identity. The fourteenth episode, "Confessions", set in Los Angeles, featured crossovers with Love & Hip Hop: Hollywood and K. Michelle: My Life, with guest appearances from cast members Lil Fizz, Nikki Mudarris and Jonathan Fernandez.

For the first time in the show's history, this season did not include a traditional reunion special filmed onstage in New York in front of a studio audience as with the previous seasons. Instead the cast filmed separately or in smaller groups at a mansion in Atlanta, GA, due to concerns for the cast and crew's safety after Joseline and Tommie's violent rivalry got police involved.

== Synopsis ==
The season opens with the introduction of the King family, who are trying to hold everything together as one of their own, Scrapp DeLeon, faces long term jail time. Mimi shocks the girls with her new lover, Chris. Karlie is unsure about her relationship with Lyfe and suspects he may be keeping secrets from her. Scrappy and Joc are enjoying the bachelor life. Tammy is dealing with the fall-out from Waka's comments on the trans community when she encounters D. Smith and Betty Idol. Stevie J and Joseline return from their adventures in Hollywood on shaky ground.

=== Reception ===
The season, including the reunion's format, received mixed reviews from fans and critics, with writer Michael Arceneaux criticizing it for being "not up to par" due its focus on its new cast members "whose problems I didn’t care about".

== Cast ==
=== Starring ===
- Mimi Faust (17 episodes)
- Rasheeda (15 episodes)
- Karlie Redd (15 episodes)
- Tammy Rivera (12 episodes)
- K. Michelle^{1} (7 episodes)
- Joseline Hernandez (14 episodes)
- Stevie J (16 episodes)

Note:

1. Added to opening credits from episode 4 onwards.

=== Also starring ===
- Yung Joc (13 episodes)
- Karen King (12 episodes)
- Scrapp DeLeon (12 episodes)
- Lil Scrappy (14 episodes)
- Momma Dee (12 episodes)
- Tommie Lee (16 episodes)
- Jessica Dime (14 episodes)
- Tiarra Becca (13 episodes)
- Chris Gould (8 episodes)
- Ariane Davis (10 episodes)
- Kirk Frost (12 episodes)
- D. Smith (8 episodes)
- Betty Idol (10 episodes)
- Bambi Benson (11 episodes)
- Waka Flocka Flame (2 episodes)
- Deb Antney (4 episodes)
- Lyfe Jennings (5 episodes)
- Kelsie Frost (6 episodes)
- Dawn Heflin (8 episodes)
- Shirleen Harvell (8 episodes)
- Ernest Bryant (7 episodes)
- Sas (11 episodes)
- J-Nicks (8 episodes)
- Amber Priddy (3 episodes)

Scrappy's assistant Taylor Hall and Tammy's friend Shod Santiago would appear as guest stars in several episodes. The show features minor appearances from notable figures within the hip hop industry and Atlanta's social scene, including T-Pain, Bu Thiam, Bobby V, Chaz Gotti, Katt Williams, CeeLo Green, Faith Evans, Tony Rock, Russell Simmons, Love & Hip Hop: Hollywood's Lil' Fizz and Nikki Mudarris, K. Michelle: My Life's Jonathan Fernandez, Fly Dantoni, Deelishis and Young Dro.

== Episodes ==
No. overall	No. in season	Title	Original release date	US viewers (millions)
69	1	"Of Kings and Queens"	April 4, 2016	2.85
Mimi's new relationship has everyone in Atlanta buzzing. Momma Dee snuffs out treason after Rasheeda and Kirk leave Scrappy high and dry. The King family has everyone on edge as Tiarra and Tommie compete to be Scrapp DeLeon's queen. Tammy returns to the opening credits, replacing departing cast member Erica. Karen, Scrapp, Tommie, Tiarra and Chris join the supporting cast. Although credited, Joseline and Stevie J do not appear.
70	2	"Full Disclosure"	April 11, 2016	2.75
Chaos ensues between Tommie and Tiarra at Mimi's party. Tiarra confronts Scrapp with an ultimatum. Tammy discovers some surprising news about a new model that she wants to hire. D. Smith and Betty Idol join the supporting cast. Although credited, Joseline and Stevie J do not appear.
71	3	"Daddy's Home"	April 18, 2016	2.82
Tammy's luncheon with D. Smith and Betty turns left. Stevie J is back from his Hollywood adventures in LA. Waka Flocka returns to Atlanta for an event. Scrapp sets up a meeting with Tiarra and Tommie. Although credited, Joseline, Rasheeda and Karlie do not appear.
72	4	"Blackmail"	April 25, 2016	2.67
Joseline returns to Atlanta with a vengeance. Scrappy and Rasheeda hash out their issues. Karlie lets it all hang out with Lyfe Jennings. K. Michelle pops up. Scrapp DeLeon pops off at KK over her relationship with Tiarra. K. Michelle returns to the opening credits. Lyfe Jennings and Kelsie join the supporting cast. Although credited, Tammy does not appear.
73	5	"Watch Your Back"	May 2, 2016	2.73
Joseline dishes on Karlie Redd, Stevie J and KK. Kirk's daughter asks for help with her music career. Tommie's suspicions about Scrapp come to a fever pitch. Mimi agonizes over Stevie J and Chris coming face to face for the first time. Although credited, K. Michelle does not appear.
74	6	"Mother of All Problems"	May 8, 2016	1.75
A surprise guest at Joseline's party leaves everyone at odds. Scrappy discovers Bambi's extracurricular activities. The King family is divided over loss. Deb makes Momma Dee and Shirleen squash their beef once and for all. Shirleen and Sas join the supporting cast. Although credited, Karlie and K. Michelle do not appear.
75	7	"Playing with Fire"	May 16, 2016	2.85
Karlie cozies up to a new man. Stevie J threatens to sever ties with Joseline, and turns to an old friend for support. K. Michelle is back in town. Mimi and Chris come to a crossroads. Jessica fans the flames between Bambi and Scrappy. Although credited, Tammy does not appear.
76	8	"Common Ground"	May 23, 2016	2.79
Scrapp DeLeon receives devastating legal news. K. Michelle's listening party brings her toe to toe with D. Smith and Betty Idol. Jessica Dime takes her relationship with Scrappy to the next level. Tiarra and KK try to find common ground, despite their crumbling relationship. J-Nicks joins the supporting cast. Although credited, Mimi, Karlie and Tammy do not appear.
77	9	"Free at Last"	May 30, 2016	2.29
Joseline is free at last, or so she thinks. Dime goes on a date with Scrappy but she's in for a surprise. When Tommie discovers a hotel receipt in Scrapp's car with Karlie's name on it, all hell breaks loose. Joseline turns to Mimi for help and Mimi learns that Stevie is hiding secrets. Although credited, Rasheeda, Tammy and K. Michelle do not appear.
78	10	"Final Goodbye"	June 6, 2016	2.69
Deb's panel discussion on bullying has a surprising outcome. D. Smith helps Ariane find her voice. Scrapp has an emotional goodbye with his son, King, and spends his final night of freedom with his family before he faces the judge. Although credited, Joseline and K. Michelle do not appear.
79	11	"Mystery Solved"	June 20, 2016	2.72
Scrapp faces his sentencing as his loved ones reflect on their future. Mimi and Stevie take a road trip to uncover the truth. Joseline makes a big confession. D. Smith and Scrappy face-off after his insensitive social media post. Although credited, Tammy and K. Michelle do not appear.
80	12	"Lovers or Friends?"	June 27, 2016	2.71
Tammy has to face the truth when Waka's indiscretions hit the blogs. While Joseline defends the legitimacy of her marriage, Stevie decides to work with one of her rivals. Joc violates the bro code as J-Nicks and Tiarra decide to take their relationship to the next level. Amber Priddy joins the supporting cast. Although credited, K. Michelle does not appear.
81	13	"Funny Business"	July 4, 2016	1.87
Stevie and Joseline come face-to-face since separating. Joseline pushes the limits by inviting Tommie to join them. Stevie flaunts his new artist, Jessica. Lyfe surprises Karlie with a ring. Rasheeda and Kirk have big plans for DLO that don't involve Kelsie. Momma Dee suspects Ernest is up to no good. D. Smith shares her music with CeeLo Green. Although credited, Tammy and K. Michelle do not appear.
82	14	"Confessions"	July 11, 2016	2.71
All hell breaks loose at Stevie's pool party when Karlie confesses to Tiarra and when Dime comes face-to-face with Joseline. Karlie and Lyfe end their relationship. K. Michelle takes Ariane under her wing. When Joc confesses his sins, J-Nicks comes up with a plan to surprise Amber. Scrappy tries to win back Bambi. Tammy and Deb share a tearful moment.
83	15	"Heart to Heart"	July 18, 2016	2.81
KK extends an olive branch to Tiarra. Mimi decides to handle unfinished business with Chris. Scrappy turns to Tammy for advice on how to win back Bambi. Karlie confronts Lyfe about another secret she's uncovered. Joseline confronts Tommie about an incident in LA. Although credited, Rasheeda and K. Michelle do not appear.
84	16	"Final Outcome"	July 25, 2016	2.64
Stevie and Joseline's relationship comes to an end. Scrappy pops the question in front of family and friends. Momma Dee apologizes to Shirleen. KK and Tiarra plan a special birthday surprise for King. The real Tommie is revealed during a counseling session. When K. Michelle asks for a favor and Joseline attends Ariane's listening party, all hell breaks loose.
85	17	"Exposed & Unfiltered – Part 1"	August 1, 2016	2.66
Due to all of the explosive fights and outbreaks this season, concerns of cast violence compel producers to reunite the cast one-on-one and in smaller groups, including a behind-the-scenes look at the cast and crew, as well as deleted scenes and unseen footage. Bambi and Betty Idol face off over Scrappy while Tommie gets word that her legal issues just got worse thanks to Joseline. Joseline reveals shocking news. host: Nina Parker
86	18	"Exposed & Unfiltered – Part 2"	August 8, 2016	2.46
Tommie reveals the real reason why Scrapp hooked up with Karlie. KK’s shocking allegations may affect Scrapp's relationship with his son forever. Stevie and Joseline come face to face after she admits she is expecting his baby. host: Nina Parker

== Music ==
Several cast members had their music featured on the show and released singles to coincide with the airing of the episodes.

List of songs performed and/or featured in Love & Hip Hop: Atlanta season five
Title	Performer	Album	Episode(s)	Notes	Ref
I'm a Dog	Sas	Follow My Lead	2, 5	performed in studio session and onstage	
Wrong Places	Yung Joc	single	2	played in radio session	
Keep it 1000 (feat. Solo Lucci)	Lil Scrappy	single	3	performed in studio session	
Automatic (feat. Thr33 Fly)	Kelsie Frost (as Kellz)	single	5	performed onstage	
Church	Joseline Hernandez	single	6	featured in music video	
Mindful	K. Michelle	More Issues Than Vogue	7, 14	featured in music video shoot performed onstage	
Ain't You	K. Michelle	More Issues Than Vogue	8	played at listening party	
Break Out	D. Smith	unreleased	10	performed in studio session	
Pluto	Betty Idol	single	11	performed in rehearsal space	
Sucka 4 Love (feat. Bobby V)	Lil Scrappy	single	11	performed onstage	
Cinema	Momma Dee	unreleased	12	performed in rehearsal space	
Put You On (feat. Mr. Vegas & Show Banga)	Karlie Redd	single	12	performed onstage	
Who Is You Kidding (feat. Skooly)	Sas	Follow My Lead	12	performed in studio session	
Make You a Star	Stevie J	unreleased	12	performed in studio session	
Fancy Girl	D. Smith	unreleased	13	played in meeting	
In That Order (feat. Yung Joc)	Momma Dee	single	14, 16	performed in studio session and onstage	
Rico (feat. Fly Datoni)	Joseline Hernandez	single	15	featured in music video shoot	
She Don't Even Know It (feat. Scrapp DeLeon)	Doobie Dorm	single	15	performed onstage	
Savage	Lyfe Jennings	single	15	featured in music video shoot	
On The Regular	Kelsie Frost (as Kellz)	single	16	performed onstage	
Confused in Love	Ariane Davis	single	16	played at listening party	
