= Time (K. Michelle song) =

Promotional single by K. Michelle

from the album More Issues Than Vogue
- Released: February 25, 2016
- Genre: R&B; soul
- Length: 4:37
- Label: Atlantic
- Songwriters: Priscilla Renea; Kimberly Pate; Eric Hudson
- Producer: Eric Hudson

"Time" is a song by American singer K. Michelle from her third studio album, More Issues Than Vogue (2016). It was released on February 25, 2016, as a promotional single from the album. Eric Hudson produced "Time" and wrote it alongside Kimberly Pate (Note: Kimberly Pate is K. Michelle's legal name, whereas she is listed on the song's credits.) and Priscilla Renea. It is an R&B and soul ballad, with lyrics revolving around the end of a relationship.

Music critics identified the focus of "Time" on leaving a bad relationship as a common theme in her music. Critical response to the song was positive; critics praised the song's lyrics and the singer's vocals, and identified it as a highlight from the album. Michelle promoted the single through a performance on the reality television series, K. Michelle: My Life.

== Background and release ==
Eric Hudson produced "Time" and wrote it alongside Kimberly Pate and Priscilla Renea. Hudson also worked as a programmer for the single. Joi Campbell, Eric Cire, Eric Dawkins, Sha Sha Jones, Sam Salter, and Young Goldie provided background vocals, while Curtis Hudson played the guitar. The track was mixed by Josh Mosser, and mastered by Christ Athens, while the vocals were produced by Dawkins.

On February 25, 2016, "Time" was made available as a promotional single from Michelle's third studio album, More Issues Than Vogue (2016), upon pre-ordering the album. Prior to its release, Michelle teased the song through black-and-white videos uploaded on her official Instagram account, where she performed with a band. On March 7, 2016, she sang the song on the reality television series K. Michelle: My Life.

== Composition and lyrics ==
"Time" is a R&B and soul ballad, which lasts four minutes and 37 seconds. In the song, Michelle sings about struggles within a relationship, while accompanied by "a smooth, gospel-tinged chord progression". The instrumental also includes "soulful melodies over climactic piano keys", along with strings, a piano, and drums. Elle Breezy of Singersroom interpreted the song as an "old-school soul record", and Ken Hamm of SoulBounce.com referred to it as an "old school slow jam".

In "Time", the singer addresses an ex-partner whom she tells that it is too late for reconciliation, through the lyrics: “It’s too late for you and I, thank God I left you right on time / Kissing you goodbye, and I did it right on time." Other lyrics include: “In a perfect world, you would try to prove your love, take me to the stars above.” Sarah Malik of MTV described the song as "sentimental", while Breezy wrote that its focus on leaving an unhealthy relationship was similar to Michelle's 2016 singles "Not a Little Bit" and "Ain't You", which are also included on More Issues Than Vogue. Bianca Gracie of Fuse associated "Time" with how Michelle "point[s] out her flaws and pour[s] out every inch of her heart in her music".

== Critical reception ==
Upon its release, "Time" received positive reviews from critics. Danny Schwartz of HotNewHipHop wrote that it was his favorite out of the promotional singles released from More Issues Than Vogue, and praised Michelle's vocals. A writer for Rap-Up commended the single as "smooth and emotional", writing that it was part of "an impressive and versatile streak of MITV leaks". Andy Kellman of AllMusic and Ben Beaumont-Thomas of The Guardian chose "Time" as one of the highlights from the album, and Holly Lewis of Sway's Universe identified the lyrics and Michelle's vocals as high points of the single. Sarah Malik wrote that Michelle "gracefully demonstrates her ability to amalgamate heartfelt lyricism with her powerful vocal range" through "Time", and "allow[s] listeners to absorb her true emotions". Ken Hamm praised the single's content, describing it as "a powerful, mature break up ballad" due to its emphasis on finding joy from the end of a relationship rather than seeking revenge.

== Credits and personnel ==
Credits adapted from AllMusic:

- Chris Athens – mastering
- Joi Campbell – vocals (background)
- Eric Cire – vocals (background)
- Eric Dawkins – vocal producer, vocals (background)
- Young Goldie – vocals (background)
- Curtis Hudson – guitar
- Eric Hudson – composer, musician, producer, programmer
- Peter Lee Johnson – strings
- Sha Sha Jones – vocals (background)
- K. Michelle – primary artist, vocals
- Nelson Kyle – recording
- Josh Mosser – mixing
- Kimberly Pate – composer
- Priscilla Renea – composer
- Sam Salter – vocals (background)

== Release history ==
Region	Format	Date	Label
Worldwide	Digital download	February 25, 2016	Atlantic
