= Love & Hip Hop: Atlanta season 3 =

Love & Hip Hop: Atlanta
- Season 3
- Cover used by the iTunes Store
- Starring: Joseline Hernandez; Erica Dixon; Rasheeda; Tammy Rivera; Karlie Redd; Mimi Faust
- No. of episodes: 20

Release
- Original network: VH1
- Original release: May 5 – September 8, 2014

Season chronology
- ← Previous; Season 2 Next → Season 4

The third season of the reality television series Love & Hip Hop: Atlanta aired on VH1 from May 5, 2014 until September 8, 2014. The season was primarily filmed in Atlanta, Georgia. It was executively produced by Mona Scott-Young for Monami Entertainment, Toby Barraud and Stefan Springman for Eastern TV, and Susan Levison, Nina L. Diaz, Brad Abramson and Danielle Gelfand for VH1.

The series chronicles the lives of several women and men in the Atlanta area, involved in hip hop music. It consists of 20 episodes, including a three-part reunion special hosted by Sommore.

== Production ==
On April 14, 2014, VH1 announced that Love & Hip Hop: Atlanta would be returning for a third season on May 5, 2014. With the exception of Traci Steele, who was fired from the show, and K. Michelle, who left to join the cast of Love & Hip Hop: New York, all main cast members from the previous season returned. Waka Flocka Flame's long time girlfriend Tammy Rivera was added to the main cast. Lil Scrappy's girlfriend Adiz "Bambi" Benson, Mimi's boyfriend Nikko London, Joseline's former friend Dawn Heflin and Waka's mother Deb Antney joined the supporting cast, along with Waka Flocka Flame, Yung Joc, aspiring actress Erica Pinkett, Kalenna Harper, her husband Tony "T." Vick and Benzino's girlfriend Althea Heart.

== Synopsis ==
Mimi has a tough decision to make when her sex tape with Nikko leaks and she is approached by one of the biggest porn companies in the world. Stevie and Joseline have announced that they are now married, but no one in Atlanta believes them, turning old friends into new enemies. Karlie has found love with rapper Yung Joc but becomes suspicious when he spends so much time with his "assistant". Scrappy is once again caught between two women, Bambi and Erica Pinkett. Rasheeda and Kirk welcome their newborn son, Karter into the family, only to find out that Kirk is up to his old tricks.

=== Reception ===
The season was a huge ratings success, with the series premiere having a combined rating of 5.6 million viewers and continuing to set ratings records throughout the season. The outrageous storylines and scandals, particularly Mimi and Nikko's sex tape, Benzino's non-fatal shooting and Joseline's violent behavior at the reunion, garnered a media storm and made its cast members tabloid fixtures. In reference to Benzino's shooting in particular, creator and executive producer Mona Scott-Young said "The timing and the way that it happened, you have another moment that you go, you can’t make this stuff up. It’s like the reality gods have once again chosen this show to smile upon.”

== Cast ==
=== Starring ===
- Joseline Hernandez (19 episodes)
- Erica Dixon (16 episodes)
- Rasheeda (19 episodes)
- Tammy Rivera (13 episodes)
- Karlie Redd (17 episodes)
- Mimi Faust (19 episodes)

=== Also starring ===
- Stevie J (20 episodes)
- Kirk Frost (17 episodes)
- Waka Flocka Flame (9 episodes)
- Lil Scrappy (17 episodes)
- Bambi Benson (11 episodes)
- Ariane Davis (11 episodes)
- Nikko London (17 episodes)
- Momma Dee (16 episodes)
- Benzino (20 episodes)
- Yung Joc (12 episodes)
- Erica Pinkett (7 episodes)
- Kalenna Harper (16 episodes)
- Dawn Heflin (9 episodes)
- Deb Antney (11 episodes)
- Althea Heart (12 episodes)
- Tony Vick (12 episodes)

K. Michelle returns in a guest appearance in one episode. Shirleen Harvell, Kirk's potential babysitter Jasmine Swann, Yung Joc's assistant Khadiyah Lewis and Kalenna's girlfriend Ashley T. Moore appear as guest stars in several episodes. The show features minor appearances from notable figures within the hip hop industry and Atlanta's social scene, including Steven Hirsch, Erica's boyfriend O'Shea Russell, Jeremih, Bobby V, DJ Vlad, Stevie J and Mimi's daughter Eva Jordan, Erica's mother Mingnon Dixon, Nikko's friend Johnny Crome, Snoop Dogg and Joseline's producer Fly Dantoni.

== Episodes ==
No. overall	No. in season	Title	Original release date	US viewers (millions)
30	1	"The Next Chapter"	May 5, 2014	3.76
Stevie and Joseline celebrate the next step in their relationship while Kirk and Rasheeda take two steps back. Momma Dee takes a bite out of Scrappy's new love interest. guest: Deb Antney (Waka Flocka’s mother), Shirleen (Rasheeda’s mother), Benzino cameo: Karter Frost, Scrapp DeLeon Tammy is added to the opening credits, replacing departing cast members K. Michelle and Traci. Tammy, Waka, Bambi and Nikko join the cast. Although credited, Karlie does not appear.
31	2	"Leaked"	May 7, 2014	2.64
When Stevie gets word of Mimi's new found infamy, there is hell to pay. Scrappy tries to juggle all of the ladies in his life. Karlie imposes ground rules on her new man Yung Joc. guest: Steven Hirsch (Adult Entertainment Executive), Erica P. cameo: Karter Yung Joc joins the supporting cast. Although credited, Rasheeda and Tammy do not appear.
32	3	"The Results Are In"	May 12, 2014	3.21
When Mimi learns that Nikko spilled her sex tape secret to Stevie, she's furious. guest: O’Shea (Erica D’s boyfriend), Althea, Jeremih (recording artist) cameo: Jasmine Erica P. joins the supporting cast. Although credited, Tammy does not appear.
33	4	"New Help"	May 19, 2014	3.41
Stevie and Joseline put their big wedding plans on hold to handle some business, which blows up in Stevie's face. Bambi suffers a setback. Kirk takes the search for a nanny into his own hands. Karlie and Joc go from breakup to makeup to bust. guest: Jasmine (waitress), Deb Antney (Waka Flocka’s mom), Khadiyah (real estate agent) cameo: Karter Kalenna and Dawn join the supporting cast. Although credited, Erica does not appear.
34	5	"Party Foul"	May 26, 2014	3.00
Dawn and Mimi are on a mission to bring Stevie J and Joseline down. Karlie and Yung Joc continue their roller coaster relationship. guest: Khadiyah (real estate agent), Jasmine (waitress)
35	6	"What's Your Position?"	June 2, 2014	3.58
Mimi and Dawn continue their quest to expose Stevie J and Joseline. Momma Dee tries to make peace between Erica Pinkett and Bambi, but only wages a new war. When Rasheeda hits a studio slump, Kirk is to blame. guest: Shirleen (Rasheeda’s mother), Tony (Kalenna’s husband) cameo: Ky Frost, Karter Although credited, Erica and Karlie do not appear.
36	7	"The Past, My Ass"	June 9, 2014	3.48
Stevie J and Benzino take on their newest venture, but when Karlie and Althea have a run in at their grand opening, it all goes down in flames. Waka and his family deal with a tragic loss. cameo: Karter, Shay Johnson Deb Antney and Althea join the supporting cast.
37	8	"Change of Course"	June 16, 2014	3.89
Stevie tries to apologize to Joseline. Erica's hot and steamy romance with O'Shea starts to fizzle. Mimi and Nikko butt heads over his past with Althea. Rasheeda, Karlie and Kalenna take a girls trip to New Orleans. guest: Shirleen (Rasheeda’s mother), O’Shea (Erica’s boyfriend) cameo: Karter, Ky Although credited, Tammy does not appear.
38	9	"Three Way, No Way"	June 23, 2014	3.83
Joseline's suspicions over Stevie's fidelity reach a fever pitch. Kirk and Rasheeda take the next step in their relationship. Kalenna's house guest causes a shake up in her marriage. Mimi and Ariane feud over Nikko. guest: Ricardo (choreographer), Ashley (Kalenna’s friend) Tony joins the supporting cast. Although credited, Erica and Tammy do not appear.
39	10	"A Bullet in the Arm"	June 30, 2014	3.79
Joseline finds out about Stevie's past and there is hell to pay. Tammy and Waka try to move forward after the death of Kayo. Mimi gets a preview of her sex tape trailer. guest: Shirleen (Rasheeda’s mother)
40	11	"Round and Round We Go"	July 7, 2014	3.75
Tammy and Waka reach a major milestone without the support of their family. Joseline gives Stevie a new ultimatum. guest: Ashley (Kalenna’s friend), Dr. Gillespie, Mona (Tammy’s mother) Although credited, Erica and Mimi do not appear.
41	12	"Release Day"	July 14, 2014	3.88
Mimi's sex tape releases to mixed reviews. Kirk's apology party for Rasheeda turns sour when Karlie comes face to face with Althea. Scrappy goes on damage control. Joseline leaves Stevie completely unraveled. guest: Eva (Mimi & Stevie’s daughter), K. Michelle, Bobby V (recording artist), Shirleen (Rasheeda’s mother), DJ Vlad (VladTV) cameo: Karter, Kandi Burruss Although credited, Tammy does not appear.
42	13	"Life Happens"	July 21, 2014	3.93
Mimi's new found celebrity lands her a spot on the cover of Stevie's magazine, much to the chagrin of Joseline. guest: Donna Siebert (mold inspector) Although credited, Karlie and Tammy do not appear.
43	14	"Loss for Words"	July 28, 2014	3.43
Stevie deals with the fallout of Mimi's magazine cover, while Mimi receives news that sends her down an emotional spiral. guest: Dr. Michael D. Randell, Simone (radio personality), Khadiyah cameo: Eva
44	15	"Blast from the Past"	July 31, 2014	2.15
Karlie and Joc reach a breaking point in their relationship. Benzino attempts to secure his future with Althea. Momma Dee and Erica try to mend old wounds. Mimi makes a shocking discovery about Nikko's past. guest: Khadiyah, Emani (Scrappy & Erica’s daughter), Arlethia (Althea’s mother), Mingnon (Erica’s mother) cameo: Renee Graziano Although credited, Joseline and Tammy do not appear.
45	16	"La La Land"	August 11, 2014	3.69
The discovery of Nikko's marriage leaves Mimi wanting answers. Tammy takes fertility matters into her own hands. Karlie serves Joc with the ultimate revenge. Stevie takes a trip to LA to record with Snoop Dogg. guest: Snoop Dogg, Dr. Mark Perloe (fertility specialist), Johnny Crome (Nikko’s ex-roommate)
46	17	"Over and Out"	August 18, 2014	3.90
Benzino outs Joseline, leaving his relationship with Stevie in question. Waka is dealt surprising news that threatens his future with Tammy. Mimi makes a final decision about her future with Nikko. Stevie and Joseline's relationship is tested. guest: Fly Dantoni (artist / producer), Rich (Joseline’s ex-driver), Dr. Perloe, M.D. (fertility specialist) cameo: Emani, Shirleen, Ky, Karter
47	18	"Reunion – Part 1"	August 25, 2014	3.98
The cast reunites to revisit all the explosive drama. Things take a turn for the worse when the tensions between Stevie J, Joseline, Benzino and Althea get physical. host: Sommore guest: Mona Scott-Young (executive producer), Khadiyah
48	19	"Reunion – Part 2"	September 1, 2014	4.06
Joseline continues to fight with other cast members, both on and off screen. The cast reflects on how things went so horribly wrong at the reunion and who is to blame. host: Sommore, Stefan Springman (segments with Benzino, Althea, Stevie and Joseline)
49	20	"Reunion – Part 3"	September 8, 2014	3.72
Mimi and Nikko reveal the status of their relationship. Stevie J, Joseline, Benzino and Althea recap the fight at the reunion from their points of view. host: Sommore, Stefan Springman (segments with Benzino, Althea, Stevie and Joseline) guest: Ashley

== Music ==
Several cast members had their music featured on the show and released singles to coincide with the airing of the episodes.

List of songs performed and/or featured in Love & Hip Hop: Atlanta season three
Title	Performer	Album	Episode(s)	Notes	Ref
Hard in da Paint	Waka Flocka Flame	Flockaveli	1	performed onstage	
Heartbreaker (feat. Young Dro)	Karlie Redd	single	3, 14, 16	performed in studio session featured in music video shoot	
Love Lock Down (feat. Kalenna)	Rasheeda	single	6, 10	performed in studio session	
I Got Bizness (feat. AE200 & D Dro)	Yung Joc	single	7	performed onstage	
Mixed Emotions	Althea Heart (as Thi Thi)	single	9	played in studio session	
Illuminati (feat. Kalenna)	J Young	single	9	played in studio session	
La Negra	Joseline Hernandez	single	9, 14	performed in studio session featured in music video	
Murder	Kalenna Harper (as Kalenna)	single	11, 14	performed in studio session	
If I Can't Have You	Bobby V	Fly on the Wall	12	performed onstage	
Been Getting Money (feat. Cap 1)	Joseline Hernandez	single	12	played in studio session	
D.N.A. (feat. Snoop Dogg)	Stevie J	VH1's Love & Hip Hop: Music from the Series	13, 16	performed in studio session	
Ghetto Love	Althea Heart (as Thi Thi)	single	15	performed onstage	
Shower Rod	Nikko London (as Nikko)	single	17	performed in studio session	
I Deserve	Momma Dee	single	17	performed in studio session background music	
