= Love & Hip Hop: Atlanta season 4 =

Love & Hip Hop: Atlanta
- Season 4
- DVD cover
- Starring: Mimi Faust; Rasheeda; Karlie Redd; Erica Dixon; Joseline Hernandez; Stevie J
- No. of episodes: 19

Release
- Original network: VH1
- Original release: April 20 – August 31, 2015

Season chronology
- ← Previous; Season 3 Next → Season 5

The fourth season of the reality television series Love & Hip Hop: Atlanta aired on VH1 from April 20, 2015 until August 31, 2015. The season was primarily filmed in Atlanta, Georgia. It was executively produced by Mona Scott-Young and Stephanie R. Gayle for Monami Entertainment, Toby Barraud, Stefan Springman, David DiGangi and Donna Edge-Rachell for Eastern TV, and Susan Levison, Nina L. Diaz, Ken Martinez and Vivian Gomez for VH1.

The series chronicles the lives of several women and men in the Atlanta area, involved in hip hop music. It consists of 19 episodes, including a two-part reunion special hosted by Nina Parker.

== Production ==
On April 9, 2015, VH1 announced that Love & Hip Hop: Atlanta would be returning for a fourth season on April 20, 2015, and will premiere alongside Love & Hip Hop Atlanta: The Afterparty Live!, a half an hour long interactive after-show hosted by Big Tigger. With the exception of Tammy Rivera, all main cast members from the previous season returned, including Stevie J, who was finally promoted to the main cast. Stevie had appeared in every single episode prior to this season as a supporting cast member. Yung Joc's girlfriend Khadiyah Lewis joined the supporting cast, along with former-stripper-turned-rapper Jessica Dime, Nikko's wife Margeaux Simms, aspiring singer Ashley Nicole, Joc's baby mama Sina Bina, rapper Tiffany Foxx and Momma Dee's ex-husband Ernest Bryant. PreMadonna appeared in a minor supporting role for two episodes. Towards the end of the season, former main cast member Tammy Rivera returned in a supporting role for three episodes.

The season was released on DVD in region 1 on July 25, 2016.

On August 27, 2015, VH1 confirmed that Stevie J and Joseline Hernandez would star in their own spin-off series, set in Los Angeles. On December 2, 2015, VH1 announced Stevie J & Joseline: Go Hollywood, which premiered January 25, 2016.

== Synopsis ==
After the shocking and violent events of last season's reunion, Joseline and Stevie J are forced to face hard truths as Stevie is sentenced to rehab. Nikko's wife Margeaux comes to town, ready to expose Mimi for her lies about the sex tape. Rasheeda suspects Kirk's relationship with his new artist Ashley Nicole may be more than just business. Joc struggles to pick sides as his four baby mamas declare war on his new girlfriend Khadiyah.

=== Reception ===
The series premiere garnered big ratings for the network, with VH1 announcing a combined rating of 6.2 million viewers. On August 19, 2015, VH1 announced the season as the summer's #1 cable reality series among adults 18-49 and women 18-49 and the 2nd most talked-about television series on social media overall.

== Cast ==
=== Starring ===
- Mimi Faust (18 episodes)
- Rasheeda (19 episodes)
- Karlie Redd (16 episodes)
- Erica Dixon (13 episodes)
- Joseline Hernandez (17 episodes)
- Stevie J (18 episodes)

=== Also starring ===
- Jessica Dime (13 episodes)
- Dawn Heflin (7 episodes)
- Momma Dee (12 episodes)
- Lil Scrappy (14 episodes)
- Bambi Benson (11 episodes)
- Ariane Davis (10 episodes)
- Margeaux Simms (16 episodes)
- Nikko London (11 episodes)
- Kirk Frost (16 episodes)
- Ashley Nicole (9 episodes)
- Yung Joc (13 episodes)
- Khadiyah Lewis (13 episodes)
- Sina Bina (10 episodes)
- Deb Antney (6 episodes)
- Kalenna Harper (13 episodes)
- Tony Vick (12 episodes)
- Tiffany Foxx (7 episodes)
- Ernest Bryant (6 episodes)
- PreMadonna (2 episodes)
- Tammy Rivera (3 episodes)

K. Michelle returns in a guest appearance in one episode. Lil Scrappy's sister Jasmine Brown would appear as a guest star in several episodes. The show features minor appearances from notable figures within the hip hop industry and Atlanta's social scene, including Stevie J and Mimi's daughter Eva Jordan, Faith Evans, Jazze Pha, Ernest's mother Bessie Bryant, Shirleen Harvell, Ariane's girlfriend DJ Toni K, Jermaine Dupri and Lyfe Jennings.

== Episodes ==
| No. overall | No. in season | Title | Original release date | US viewers (millions) |
|---|---|---|---|---|
| 50 | 1 | "The Danger Zone" | April 20, 2015 | 3.54 |
Stevie J's bad behavior leaves Mimi's newest business venture in jeopardy. Erica struggles with Scrappy over child support. Kirk lands a new "office" and a new artist right under Rasheeda's nose. Stevie J is added to the opening credits, replacing departing cast member Tammy. Jessica Dime, Margeaux and Ashley Nicole join the supporting cast. Although credited, Joseline does not appear.
| 51 | 2 | "Say Goodbye" | April 27, 2015 | 2.96 |
Yung Joc tries to juggle new love with an old flame. Rasheeda gets some alarming information from Kirk's new artist. Khadiyah and Sina join the supporting cast. Although credited, Erica does not appear.
| 52 | 3 | "Rehabilitation" | May 4, 2015 | 2.65 |
Erica makes moves that threaten to land Scrappy behind bars. Sina plans to win back Yung Joc by any means necessary. Karlie's grand opening goes up in flames, along with several of her friendships.
| 53 | 4 | "Cuffed Up" | May 11, 2015 | 2.80 |
Khadiyah puts Yung Joc in a compromising position after Sina presents her with incriminating evidence. Margeaux arrives in Atlanta and forms an unlikely friendship. Kalenna prepares for the arrival of her baby.
| 54 | 5 | "Rumor Has It..." | May 18, 2015 | 3.12 |
Margeaux and Joseline fire up rumors about Mimi's role in the sex tape controversy. Momma Dee receives an offer she has to refuse. Rasheeda learns Kirk is over budget and out of excuses. Tiffany, Ernest and PreMadonna join the supporting cast. Although credited, Erica does not appear.
| 55 | 6 | "Face the Music" | June 1, 2015 | 2.57 |
Momma Dee holds court to air out the grievances in the palace. Stevie J's future remains in the balance as he heads to New York to face his day in court. Kirk's artist rubs Rasheeda the wrong way.
| 56 | 7 | "Three-Ring Circus" | June 8, 2015 | 2.59 |
Margeaux and Nikko dissect Mimi's side of the story. Kirk discovers Rasheeda's plans to auction off his assets. Joc tries to smooth things over with Khadiyah. Joseline learns that Stevie has been working with other artists.
| 57 | 8 | "The Truth Hurts" | June 15, 2015 | 2.67 |
Kalenna and Tony make a major investment with their life savings. Khadiyah comes face to face with Yung Joc's exes. Kirk tries to broker peace between Ashley and Rasheeda. Joseline needs Stevie's help. Mimi prepares to make a big confession. Although credited, Karlie and Erica do not appear.
| 58 | 9 | "I Deserve" | June 22, 2015 | 3.00 |
Mimi finally comes clean to her best friend Ariane. Joseline and Stevie perform at the opening of Tony and Kalenna's club. Margeaux drops a huge bomb on Nikko. Although credited, Karlie and Erica do not appear.
| 59 | 10 | "Friends with Benefits" | June 29, 2015 | 2.96 |
Yung Joc tries to make amends with Khadiyah. Kalenna searches for a new manager. Jessica spills some major tea about her old friend Joseline, leading to a showdown between them at last. Although credited, Erica does not appear.
| 60 | 11 | "On the Road" | July 6, 2015 | 2.93 |
Joseline and Stevie go to LA to work on a business deal. Jessica Dime and Margueax show off their skills at open mic night.
| 61 | 12 | "Blast from the Past" | July 12, 2015 | 1.85 |
Rasheeda and Erica confront Kirk and his new artist. Scrappy has a surprise for Bambi. Joc commits to Khadiyah once and for all. Tammy returns to the scene to confront Kalenna about her behaviour towards her mother-in-law, Deb. Tammy returns as a supporting cast member. Although credited, Karlie, Joseline, and Stevie J do not appear.
| 62 | 13 | "Revenge" | July 20, 2015 | 2.97 |
Stevie tries to give Nikko a taste of his own medicine. Karlie and Sina plan revenge on Khadiyah. Rasheeda and Kalenna have a falling out as Kalenna confronts a serious medical issue.
| 63 | 14 | "Countdown" | July 27, 2015 | 2.94 |
Margeaux confronts Joseline and Stevie about their shady business dealings. Kirk and Tony try to broker the peace between Rasheeda and Kalenna. Scrappy is thrown for a loop when Bambi shoots a steamy video behind his back. Although credited, Erica does not appear.
| 64 | 15 | "Doing Me" | August 3, 2015 | 2.79 |
Joseline branches out musically, going behind Stevie's back to record a hot new track. Momma Dee starts preparing for her dream wedding, endangering her relationships with her family in the process. Although credited, Mimi does not appear.
| 65 | 16 | "Bait and Switch" | August 10, 2015 | 2.94 |
Kirk plans a massive surprise for Rasheeda. Scrappy threatens to abdicate the throne on the eve of Momma Dee's wedding. Kalenna and Tony meet with a therapist. Stevie takes the guys on a farewell fishing trip and discovers a secret about Joseline.
| 66 | 17 | "I Do" | August 17, 2015 | 3.32 |
Momma Dee's royal wedding day arrives, but her children may not show up for her crowning moment. Margeaux reveals a secret to Nikko that turns his world upside down. cameo: Traci Steele, Kandi Burruss
| 67 | 18 | "Reunion – Part 1" | August 24, 2015 | 3.35 |
The cast reunites for the first time since last year's dramatic reunion. Mimi takes care of unfinished business and things get heated between Nikko and Stevie. host: Nina Parker
| 68 | 19 | "Reunion – Part 2" | August 31, 2015 | 3.41 |
When the reunion continues, Joseline drops a huge bomb on Mimi. Scrappy unloads on Erica. Rasheeda and Joseline square off. A revelation from Momma Dee leaves the cast speechless. Joseline and Stevie make a special performance. host: Nina Parker

== Music ==
Several cast members had their music featured on the show and released singles to coincide with the airing of the episodes.

List of songs performed and/or featured in Love & Hip Hop: Atlanta season four
| Title | Performer | Album | Episode(s) | Notes | Ref |
|---|---|---|---|---|---|
| Starz Tonight (feat. Juliet Burke) | Tiffany Foxx | single | 1 | performed onstage | |
| I Deserve | Momma Dee | single | 1, 9 | performed onstage | |
| Stingy With My Kutty Katt (feat. Stevie J) | Joseline Hernandez | single | 3, 9, 17, 19 | performed in rehearsal and onstage performed at reunion | |
| Trippin | Ashley Nicole | single | 6, 11 | performed in rehearsal and onstage | |
| Disrespectful | Jessica Dime | single | 11, 12 | performed onstage and in studio session | |
| Start a War | Margeaux Simms (as Margeaux) | single | 11, 16 | performed onstage | |
| I Meant It | Rasheeda | single | 13 | performed in studio session | |
| She Ready | Laudie | single | 14 | featured in music video | |
| Worried | Lil Scrappy | Merlo's Way | 14 | performed in studio session | |
| Church | Joseline Hernandez | single | 15, 17, 19 | performed in studio and onstage performed at reunion | |
| Space & Time | Kalenna Harper (as Kalenna) | single | 17 | performed in studio session | |

== Love & Hip Hop Atlanta: After Party Live! ==

Love & Hip Hop Atlanta: After Party Live! is a live after show, that aired during the show's fourth season. Big Tigger hosted the show starring cast members from Love & Hip Hop: Atlanta, as well as musicians, comedians and various television personalities from different reality shows by VH1 and other networks.

| No. in series | Title | Original air date |
|---|---|---|
| 1 | "After Party Live! #401" | April 20, 2015 |
Stevie J and Mimi Faust join host Darian "Big Tigger" Morgan to discuss the Love & Hip Hop: Atlanta season 4 premiere episode.
| 2 | "After Party Live! #402" | April 27, 2015 |
Rasheeda, Kirk Frost and Nikko London join host Big Tigger to discuss episode 2.
| 3 | "After Party Live! #403" | May 4, 2015 |
Jessica Dime, Karlie Redd and FaceTime guest Yung Joc join host Big Tigger to discuss episode 3.
| 4 | "After Party Live! #404" | May 11, 2015 |
Yung Joc, Momma Dee and FaceTime guest Ray J join host Big Tigger to discuss episode 4.
| 5 | "After Party Live! #405" | May 18, 2015 |
Margeaux, Rich Dollaz and FaceTime guests K. Michelle, Yandy Smith and Mendeecees Harris join host Big Tigger to discuss episode 5.
| 6 | "After Party Live! #406" | June 1, 2015 |
Joseline Hernandez, Karlie Redd and FaceTime guest Nikki Mudarris join host Big Tigger to discuss episode 6.
| 7 | "After Party Live! #407" | June 8, 2015 |
Rasheeda, Margeaux and FaceTime guest Ashley Nicole join host Big Tigger to discuss episode 7.
| 8 | "After Party Live! #408" | June 15, 2015 |
Yung Joc, Shekinah and FaceTime guests T.I. and Tiny join host Big Tigger to discuss episode 8.
| 9 | "After Party Live! #409" | June 22, 2015 |
Stevie J, Tami Roman, Momma Dee, Ariane Davis and Nikko London join host Big Tigger to discuss episode 9.
| 10 | "After Party Live! #410" | June 29, 2015 |
Kalenna Harper, Lil Duval, Karlie Redd and FaceTime guest Hazel E join host Big Tigger to discuss episode 10.
| 11 | "After Party Live! #411" | July 6, 2015 |
Jessica Dime, Jackie Christie, Erica Dixon and FaceTime guest Remy Ma join host Big Tigger to discuss episode 11.
| 12 | "After Party Live! #413" | July 20, 2015 |
Tammy Rivera, Trina, Sina and FaceTime guest Nikki Mudarris join Big Tigger to discuss episode 13.
| 13 | "After Party Live! #414" | July 27, 2015 |
Momma Dee, Bambi Benson, Lisa Wu and Shekinah join host Big Tigger to discuss episode 14.
| 14 | "After Party Live! #415" | August 3, 2015 |
Lil Scrappy, Yung Joc, Lil' Fizz and FaceTime guest Teairra Marí join host Big Tigger to discuss episode 15.
