= Waka & Tammy: What The Flocka =

American television series

- Also known as: Waka & Tammy
- Genre: Reality
- Starring: Waka Flocka Flame; Tammy Rivera
- Country of origin: United States
- Original language: English
- No. of seasons: 3
- No. of episodes: 19

Production
- Executive producers: Tara Long; Gennifer Gardiner; Tammy Rivera-Malphurs; Juaquin Malphurs; Datari Turner; Debra Antney; Lauren Gellert; Kari McFarland
- Camera setup: Multi-camera
- Production company: eOne

Original release
- Network: WE tv
- Release: March 12, 2020 – October 6, 2022

Waka & Tammy: What The Flocka is an American reality television series that premiered on March 12, 2020, and airs on WE tv. It chronicles the lives of Waka Flocka Flame and Tammy Rivera as they navigate life after their time on Marriage Boot Camp: Hip Hop Edition. The backdoor pilot for the series, which featured their wedding, aired in March 2019.

On September 29, 2020, the series was renewed for a 8-episode second season.

== Episodes ==
=== Series overview ===
Season	Episodes	Originally released	
Season	Episodes	First released	Last released
1	6	March 12, 2020	April 16, 2020
2	8	March 18, 2021	May 6, 2021
3	8	August 18, 2022	October 6, 2022

=== Season 1 (2020) ===
No. overall	No. in season	Title	Original release date	U.S. viewers (millions)
1	1	"Marriage is Chaos"	March 12, 2020	0.29
2	2	"Marriage Is Deception"	March 19, 2020	0.31
3	3	"Marriage Is a Firestorm"	March 26, 2020	0.30
4	4	"Marriage Is Madness"	April 2, 2020	0.29
5	5	"Marriage Is Lustful"	April 9, 2020	0.32
6	6	"Marriage Is WTF"	April 16, 2020	0.26

=== Season 2 (2021) ===
No. overall	No. in season	Title	Original release date	U.S. viewers (millions)
7	1	"Marriage Is Shocking"	March 18, 2021	N/A
8	2	"Marriage Is Emotional"	March 25, 2021	N/A
9	3	"Marriage Is Unpredictable"	April 1, 2021	N/A
10	4	"Marriage Is Dramatic"	April 8, 2021	N/A
11	5	"Marriage Is Intense"	April 15, 2021	N/A
12	6	"Marriage Is Stressful"	April 22, 2021	N/A
13	7	"Marriage Is Unconditional"	April 29, 2021	N/A
14	8	"Marriage Is Lit"	May 6, 2021	N/A

=== Season 3 (2022) ===
No. overall	No. in season	Title	Original release date	U.S. viewers (millions)
14	1	"Separated or Nah?"	August 18, 2022	N/A
15	2	"Separation is Getting a New Perspective"	August 25, 2022	N/A
16	3	"Separation Is Co-Parenting"	September 1, 2022	N/A
17	4	"Separation Is Extended Family Dynamics"	September 8, 2022	N/A
18	5	"Separation Is Compromising"	September 15, 2022	N/A
19	6	"Separation Is Filling in the Emptiness"	September 22, 2022	N/A
20	7	"Separation Is Finding a New Normal"	September 29, 2022	N/A
21	8	"What the Flocka: Divorce"	October 6, 2022	N/A

=== Specials ===
Title	Original release date	U.S. viewers (millions)
"Waka & Tammy Tie the Knot: Part 1"	March 21, 2019	0.55
"Waka & Tammy Tie the Knot: Part 2"	March 28, 2019	0.44
