= Mindful (song) =

2016 single by K. Michelle

Single by K. Michelle

from the album More Issues Than Vogue
- Released: February 19, 2016
- Genre: Hip-hop; R&B
- Length: 1:55
- Label: Atlantic
- Songwriter: T-Pain
- Producer: T-Pain

K. Michelle singles chronology
"Ain't You" (2016)	"Mindful" (2016)	"If It Ain't Me" (2017)

"Mindful" is a song by the American singer K. Michelle from her third album, More Issues Than Vogue (2016). T-Pain wrote and produced the song, which Atlantic Records released as the album's third single on February 19, 2016. Throughout the hip-hop and R&B track, Michelle raps the lyrics and warns people to be "mindful" of her. Some reviewers noted that its uptempo production differed from Michelle's previous singles, and she stated that it was one of the first times she recorded a more light-hearted song.

Critics praised Michelle's rapping in "Mindful", and referred to it as a highlight of her singles. The song's music video, which was released on March 10, 2016, portrays Michelle arguing with women in a trailer park, and was described by reviewers as colorful.

== Background and release ==
T-Pain wrote and produced two songs—"Mindful" and "Got Em Like"—for K. Michelle's third album More Issues Than Vogue (2016). He appeared in a 2016 episode of Michelle's reality television show K. Michelle: My Life, in which they worked together in a recording studio. Thomas Burroughs recorded "Mindful" at the Atlantic Studios in Atlanta, and it was mixed by Kevin "KD" Davis. Eric Cire produced the vocals and Chris Athens mastered the track, along with those for the rest of the album, at his personal studio in Austin, Texas.

Atlantic Records released "Mindful" as the third single from the album on February 19, 2016. It was made available as a digital download; one of these releases has the explicit and clean versions as well as the music video. "Mindful" is the first track on More Issues Than Vogue, which was released on March 25, 2016. Michelle performed the song in 2016 at the album's release party at Webster Hall in New York City and the Hot 104.1's Super Jam concert in St. Louis.

The music video for "Mindful" was released on March 10, 2016, through Michelle's YouTube channel. It was one of four videos to promote More Issues Than Vogue, along with "Not a Little Bit", "Got Em Like", and "Ain't You". The production of the "Mindful" video was shown on the reality television series Love & Hip Hop: Atlanta, in which cast member Karlie Redd appeared on the set to have a discussion with Michelle.

In an article for Revolt, Seriah Buckler summarized that the video was about "an all female crew vs. crew battle" in a trailer park. It begins with Michelle playing cards with her friends outside of her pink mobile home. When she notices her neighbors gossiping about her, she confronts them and dances in the street. For these scenes, Michelle wears a fur coat and has a rainbow-colored wig. Several critics described the video as colorful. It is intercut with sequences of Michelle cleaning her house while wearing a sheer dress, pink heels, and a blonde bob cut. She wears a pink jacket with the words "Slay Michelle", which The Boombox's Victoria Johnson compared to those worn by the Pink Ladies in the 1978 film Grease.

== Music and lyrics ==
"Mindful"
In "Mindful", K. Michelle raps over an instrumental that includes hand claps and a guitar, which critics described as funky.

"Mindful" is a one-minute, 55-second uptempo song with an instrumental featuring hand claps and a guitar. Alex Macpherson for Brooklyn Magazine described the production as "ridiculous guitar squiggles". Critics associated various elements of the single with funk. Michelle raps throughout the song, which she had previously done on her 2012 mixtape 0 Fucks Given and a remix of Yo Gotti's 2015 single "Down in the DM". Reviewing More Issues Than Vogue for The Philadelphia Inquirer, Bill Chenevert classified all its tracks, including "Mindful", as "full-on urban R&B and hip-hop".

Throughout "Mindful", Michelle warns critics and "hoes" to be "mindful" around her, trash talks them, and tells them to stay away from her. The Guardian's Ben Beaumont-Thomas interpreted the song's opening line "Who the fuck told you hoes to open up" as establishing the album's tone, which he said had "a fair bit of sass" and was "low on bland aggro". Michelle directs the song toward "all kinds of hos" while comparing herself to Uma Thurman from the films Kill Bill: Volume 1 (2003) and Kill Bill: Volume 2 (2004). Michael Cragg, also writing for The Guardian, singled out the lyric "I'm coming straight from the gut" as one of her warnings. In an article for Rap-Up, Andres noted that the song had an "in-your-face" approach with its lyrics, and a writer for Vibe referring to Michelle's rapping style as "fiery".

Some critics have compared the single with Michelle's other songs and albums. In a 2016 interview with the St. Louis Post-Dispatch, Michelle said "Mindful" and "Rich" were some of the few instances she has done "fun songs", and described More Issues Than Vogue as having "a lot of light songs". Kevin C. Johnson, a writer for the newspaper, characterized the album as a "more carefree effort" for Michelle, noting it was "not as heavy as what she's used to delivering". In a review for Cape Argus, Helen Herimbi cited the song, as well as "Nightstand" and "Rich", as examples of how Michelle was "not trying to be a pretty R&B diva".

== Critical reception ==
Andres for Rap-Up cited "Mindful" as part of a "hot streak" of music released by Michelle, and HotNewHipHop critic Danny Schwartz wrote that he was the most impressed with "Mindful" out of the More Issues Than Vogue singles. Reviewing the album, Bill Chenevert complimented the song, calling it "outstanding" and a "blast". AllMusic's Andy Kellman praised T-Pain's songs for providing a "strong, strutting start" to the album; however, he picked "Got Em Like" as a high point and not "Mindful".

Reviewers enjoyed Michelle's rapping. Seriah Buckler wrote that she "rides the beat like a seasoned lyricist", and described the song as "laden with raw bars and a flow that your favorite rapper couldn't carry". Renowned for Sound's Michael Smith said Michelle exerts her "dominance and strength" throughout the single. Trevor Smith of HotNewHipHop and Pitchfork's Britt Julious commended Michelle for showcasing her personality through her rapping. Although Julious criticized the song's brevity, she remarked that Michelle rapped with a "rapid fire confidence". In Out, Ty Cole praised Michelle's range as a musician, highlighting her rapping for "Mindful" and her vocals for ballads, and referred to her as having a "captivating flow".

== Track listing ==
Digital download
No.	Title	Length
1.	"Mindful" (Explicit)	1:55
2.	"Mindful" (Clean)	1:55
3.	"Mindful" (Video)	2:08

== Credits and personnel ==
Credits adapted from the liner notes of More Issues Than Vogue:

Recording locations

- Recorded in the Atlantic Studios in Atlanta and mastered in Chris Athens's studio in Austin, Texas

Personnel

- T-Pain – writing and production
- Thomas Burroughs – recording
- Kevin "KD" Davis – mixing
- Eric Cire – vocal production
- Chris Athens – mastering
