= Nicolino =

Nicolino is a surname. Notable people with the surname include:

- Fabrice Nicolino (born 1955), French journalist
- Justin Nicolino (born 1991), American baseball pitcher
- Venus Nicolino (born 1972), American media personality, author, and doctor of clinical psychology

== See also ==
- Nicolò Grimaldi
