= List of Marriage Boot Camp episodes =

Marriage Boot Camp is an American reality television series aired on We TV that debuted on May 31, 2013, as Marriage Boot Camp: Bridezillas which initially aired as a spin-off to Bridezillas. The series was renamed from Marriage Boot Camp: Bridezillas to Marriage Boot Camp: Reality Stars following the second season. The first two seasons documented couples who had previously been featured on Bridezillas, as they move into a house together to receive help in repairing their relationship. Following the second season, the series began featuring current and former reality stars moving into the house with their significant others to receive help in repairing their relationships also.

== Series overview ==
Season	Episodes	Originally released	
Season	Episodes	First released	Last released
1	10	May 31, 2013	July 26, 2013
2	11	March 7, 2014	May 16, 2014
3	8	May 30, 2014	July 25, 2014
4	10	January 9, 2015	March 13, 2015
5	12	May 29, 2015	August 21, 2015
6	10	December 4, 2015	February 19, 2016
7	10	June 3, 2016	August 12, 2016
8	10	October 7, 2016	December 16, 2016
9	10	January 6, 2017	March 10, 2017
10	8	April 28, 2017	June 23, 2017
11	10	October 13, 2017	December 22, 2017
12	10	March 9, 2018	May 11, 2018
13	10	September 7, 2018	November 9, 2018
14	10	January 10, 2019	March 14, 2019
15	11	October 11, 2019	December 27, 2019
16	11	February 6, 2020	April 16, 2020
17	11	July 2, 2020	September 10, 2020
18	10	October 7, 2021	December 16, 2021
19	10	March 31, 2022	June 2, 2022

== Episodes ==
=== Season 1 (2013) ===
No. overall	No. in season	Title	Original release date
Bridezillas
1	1	"Who Needs Therapy"	May 31, 2013
2	2	"Grave Loss"	June 7, 2013
3	3	"Love and Warfare"	June 14, 2013
4	4	"Spouse Swap"	June 21, 2013
5	5	"Dance With the Devil"	June 28, 2013
6	6	"Sex, Lies & Cellphones"	July 5, 2013
7	7	"The Plunge"	July 12, 2013
8	8	"Liars Exposed"	July 19, 2013
9	9	"I Do or I Don't"	July 26, 2013
10	10	"Bridezillas Reunion"	July 26, 2013

=== Season 2 (2014) ===
No. overall	No. in season	Title	Original release date
Bridezillas 2
11	1	"Booze and Breakdowns"	March 7, 2014
12	2	"Death or Divorce"	March 14, 2014
13	3	"She Shot Her Husband!"	March 21, 2014
14	4	"Don't Touch My Woman!"	March 28, 2014
15	5	"A Maze and Confused"	April 4, 2014
16	6	"Spouse Swap"	April 11, 2014
17	7	"Sex is the Glue"	April 18, 2014
18	8	"Leap or Die Frying"	April 18, 2014
19	9	"The Lie Detector"	May 2, 2014
20	10	"Proposal or Disposal"	May 9, 2014
21	11	"The Aftermath"	May 16, 2014

=== Season 3 (2014) ===
No. overall	No. in season	Title	Original release date
Reality Stars
22	1	"The Ambush"	May 30, 2014
23	2	"Ring of Fire"	June 6, 2014
24	3	"The Morgue"	June 13, 2014
25	4	"Secrets and Lies"	June 20, 2014
26	5	"Daters and Traitors"	June 27, 2014
27	6	"Sex and the Secret"	July 11, 2014
28	7	"Fate Comes Knocking"	July 18, 2014
29	8	"Proposal or Disposal"	July 25, 2014

=== Season 4 (2015) ===
No. overall	No. in season	Title	Original release date	U.S. viewers (millions)
Reality Stars 2
30	1	"House of Lies"	January 9, 2015	0.606
31	2	"Death and Divorce Court"	January 16, 2015	0.662
32	3	"Played and Betrayed"	January 23, 2015	0.629
33	4	"Picture Perfect Revenge"	January 30, 2015	0.518
34	5	"Shock It To Me"	February 6, 2015	0.472
35	6	"Lust or Bust"	February 13, 2015	0.688
36	7	"The Exorcism"	February 20, 2015	0.519
37	8	"Let Them Eat Cake"	February 27, 2015	0.516
38	9	"Deception Indicated"	March 6, 2015	0.591
39	10	"The Ultimatum"	March 13, 2015	0.676

=== Season 5 (2015) ===
No. overall	No. in season	Title	Original release date	U.S. viewers (millions)
Reality Stars 3
40	1	"Shotgun Wedding"	May 29, 2015	0.986
41	2	"Death Wish"	June 5, 2015	0.863
42	3	"Sex, Lies and Audiotape"	June 12, 2015	0.762
43	4	"Disorderly Courtship"	June 19, 2015	0.861
44	5	"Troubled Waters"	June 26, 2015	0.883
45	6	"Dangerous Liaisons"	July 10, 2015	0.701
46	7	"The Confession"	July 17, 2015	0.792
47	8	"The Sex Tape"	July 24, 2015	0.798
48	9	"Grave Injustice"	July 31, 2015	0.659
49	10	"The Long Lie"	August 7, 2015	0.659
50	11	"Web of Lies"	August 14, 2015	0.751
51	12	"Diamonds Aren't Forever"	August 21, 2015	1.06

=== Season 6 (2015–16) ===
No. overall	No. in season	Title	Original release date	U.S. viewers (millions)
Reality Stars 4
52	1	"An Affair to Remember"	December 4, 2015	0.78
53	2	"The Secret Weapon"	December 11, 2015	0.65
54	3	"Dancing With the Devil"	December 18, 2015	0.71
55	4	"The Low Blow"	January 8, 2016	0.62
56	5	"Sugar Coated Lies"	January 15, 2016	0.67
57	6	"Kiss and Tell"	January 22, 2016	0.86
58	7	"Mocked and Rocked"	January 29, 2016	0.75
59	8	"Love and Behold"	February 5, 2016	0.58
60	9	"Poly-Wrath"	February 12, 2016	0.73
61	10	"The Broken Heart"	February 19, 2016	0.68

=== Season 7 (2016) ===
No. overall	No. in season	Title	Original release date	U.S. viewers (millions)
Reality Stars 5
62	1	"Taradise Lost"	June 3, 2016	0.85
63	2	"Over My Dead Body"	June 10, 2016	0.73
64	3	"Loose Lips Kill Relationships"	June 17, 2016	0.62
65	4	"Memp-hitz The Fan"	June 24, 2016	0.61
66	5	"Hit Me With Your Best Shock"	July 8, 2016	0.53
67	6	"Puppet Master"	July 15, 2016	0.56
68	7	"Trainwrecking"	July 22, 2016	0.52
69	8	"Panic in the Control Room"	July 29, 2016	0.58
70	9	"Lying Up a Storm"	August 5, 2016	0.51
71	10	"Unveil the Betrayal"	August 12, 2016	0.67

=== Season 8 (2016) ===
No. overall	No. in season	Title	Original release date	U.S. viewers (millions)
Reality Stars 6
72	0	"Most Outrageous Moments"	October 7, 2016	0.28
73	1	"Can I Get a Witness?"	October 7, 2016	0.76
74	2	"The Deadly Storm"	October 14, 2016	0.47
75	3	"Blood in the Water"	October 21, 2016	0.50
76	4	"Stranger Danger"	October 28, 2016	0.44
77	5	"Pedal to the Meddle"	November 4, 2016	0.49
78	6	"I Want a Husband and a Wife!"	November 11, 2016	0.59
79	7	"The Weakest Link"	November 18, 2016	0.57
80	8	"Black Heart Down"	December 2, 2016	0.51
81	9	"Jersey House Lies"	December 9, 2016	0.51
82	10	"Make Merika Great Again"	December 16, 2016	0.52

=== Season 9 (2017) ===
No. overall	No. in season	Title	Original release date	U.S. viewers (millions)
Reality Stars 7
83	1	"100 Questions and Counting"	January 6, 2017	0.53
84	2	"Two of a Crime"	January 13, 2017	0.39
85	3	"Bust a Move"	January 20, 2017	0.43
86	4	"Children of the Scorned"	January 27, 2017	0.47
87	5	"Let Them Eat Pie"	February 3, 2017	0.42
88	6	"I'm Too Sexy for My Dirt"	February 10, 2017	0.39
89	7	"Joe Blows"	February 17, 2017	0.46
90	8	"What the Buck"	February 24, 2017	0.45
91	9	"Lying in Wait"	March 3, 2017	0.60
92	10	"You Booze, You Lose"	March 10, 2017	0.68

=== Season 10 (2017) ===
No. overall	No. in season	Title	Original release date	U.S. viewers (millions)
Reality Stars - Family Edition
93	1	"Wreck the Halls"	April 28, 2017	0.74
94	2	"Close Your Coffin"	May 5, 2017	0.59
95	3	"Another Brick in the Wall"	May 12, 2017	0.51
96	4	"Mama Don't Play"	May 19, 2017	0.51
97	5	"Can't Escape the Situation"	June 2, 2017	0.58
98	6	"Ding Dong the Witch is Wed!"	June 9, 2017	0.45
99	7	"Mamageddon"	June 16, 2017	0.57
100	8	"The F Bomb"	June 23, 2017	0.57

=== Season 11 (2017) ===
No. overall	No. in season	Title	Original release date	U.S. viewers (millions)
Reality Stars 8
101	1	"Becky With the Good Hair"	October 13, 2017	0.40
102	2	"Murder He Wrote"	October 20, 2017	0.46
103	3	"Great Balls of Blame!"	October 27, 2017	0.50
104	4	"Single and Ready to Strangle"	November 3, 2017	0.49
105	5	"Man Overboard"	November 10, 2017	0.51
106	6	"There's No Crying in Threesomes!"	November 17, 2017	0.46
107	7	"Prison Breakdown"	December 1, 2017	0.35
108	8	"Playing With Fire"	December 8, 2017	0.35
109	9	"Petty Little Liars"	December 15, 2017	0.37
110	10	"The Ex-orcism"	December 22, 2017	0.57

=== Season 12 (2018) ===
No. overall	No. in season	Title	Original release date	U.S. viewers (millions)
Reality Stars - Family Edition 2
111	1	"Show and Hell"	March 9, 2018	0.41
112	2	"Snake in the Grass"	March 16, 2018	0.50
113	3	"Who Let the Dogs Out?"	March 23, 2018	0.49
114	4	"Rose All Day"	March 30, 2018	0.53
115	5	"Boot Camping"	April 6, 2018	0.53
116	6	"Come Hell or High Water"	April 13, 2018	0.52
117	7	"Scrooged and Abused"	April 20, 2018	0.44
118	8	"Don't Hate, Participate"	April 27, 2018	0.45
119	9	"The Last Lie"	May 4, 2018	0.55
120	10	"A Family Affair"	May 11, 2018	0.56

=== Season 13 (2018) ===
No. overall	No. in season	Title	Original release date	U.S. viewers (millions)
Reality Stars - Family Edition 3
121	1	"Prom Night"	September 7, 2018	0.45
122	2	"Check Your Baggage"	September 14, 2018	0.47
123	3	"Death Wish"	September 21, 2018	0.42
124	4	"Love Shock"	September 28, 2018	0.44
125	5	"Drunk in Love"	October 5, 2018	0.41
126	6	"Talk Dirty to Me"	October 12, 2018	0.39
127	7	"Night Terrors"	October 19, 2018	0.46
128	8	"Ice Ice Baby"	October 26, 2018	0.43
129	9	"Bachelor Secret Revealed!"	November 2, 2018	0.44
130	10	"End of the Road"	November 9, 2018	0.50

=== Season 14 (2019) ===
No. overall	No. in season	Title	Original release date	U.S. viewers (millions)
Hip Hop Edition
131	1	"It Ain't All Gucci"	January 10, 2019	0.65
132	2	"Drop It Like It's Hot"	January 17, 2019	0.53
133	3	"Road Rage"	January 24, 2019	0.56
134	4	"Hashtag Drama"	January 31, 2019	0.56
135	5	"Mazed and Confused"	February 7, 2019	0.60
136	6	"Sex, Lies & Facetime"	February 14, 2019	0.62
137	7	"Breaking Bad"	February 21, 2019	0.67
138	8	"Mo Honey, Mo Problems"	February 28, 2019	0.69
139	9	"Lyin' Dirty"	March 7, 2019	0.66
140	10	"Re-lit or Quit"	March 14, 2019	0.78

=== Season 15 (2019) ===
No. overall	No. in season	Title	Original release date	U.S. viewers (millions)
Reality Stars - Family Edition 4
141	1	"Family Secrets Ahead"	October 11, 2019	0.35
142	2	"The Pop Star Always Win"	October 18, 2019	0.32
143	3	"Family Lock Up"	October 25, 2019	0.25
144	4	"Off the Deep End"	November 1, 2019	0.28
145	5	"Wet and Whining"	November 8, 2019	0.30
146	6	"Lost at Sea"	November 15, 2019	0.25
147	7	"Cycling Through the Past"	November 22, 2019	0.35
148	8	"Dogged Pursuit"	December 6, 2019	0.20
149	9	"Burned Question"	December 13, 2019	0.19
150	10	"The Last Resort"	December 20, 2019	0.14
151	11	"Secrets Revealed"	December 27, 2019	N/A

=== Season 16 (2020) ===
No. overall	No. in season	Title	Original release date	U.S. viewers (millions)
Hip Hop Edition 2
152	1	"Hashtag Not Winning"	February 6, 2020	0.36
153	2	"Drop the Mic"	February 13, 2020	0.33
154	3	"Bae Watch"	February 20, 2020	0.39
155	4	"Shock to the System"	February 27, 2020	0.45
156	5	"Dirty Little Secrets"	March 5, 2020	0.53
157	6	"Boot Camp Betrayal"	March 12, 2020	0.49
158	7	"The Naked Truth"	March 19, 2020	0.39
159	8	"Scarred Pasts"	March 26, 2020	0.38
160	9	"Love the Way You Lie"	April 2, 2020	0.40
161	10	"Put a Ring On It"	April 9, 2020	0.42
162	11	"Secrets Revealed"	April 16, 2020	0.26

=== Season 17 (2020) ===
No. overall	No. in season	Title	Original release date	U.S. viewers (millions)
Hip Hop Edition 3
163	1	"Electing to Face the Music"	July 2, 2020	0.39
164	2	"Drama Said Knock You Out"	July 9, 2020	0.48
165	3	"Swap It Like It's Hot"	July 16, 2020	0.48
166	4	"Pod Clash"	July 23, 2020	0.49
167	5	"Hard Shock Life"	July 30, 2020	0.49
168	6	"Luv Ya Self"	August 6, 2020	0.49
169	7	"Talk Dirty to Me"	August 13, 2020	0.52
170	8	"Break the Cycle"	August 20, 2020	0.45
171	9	"Truth Hurts"	August 27, 2020	0.45
172	10	"Vow or Never"	September 3, 2020	0.47
173	11	"Secrets Revealed"	September 10, 2020	N/A

=== Season 18 (2021) ===
No. overall	No. in season	Title	Original release date	U.S. viewers (millions)
Hip Hop Edition 4
174	1	"Lovers on Lockdown"	October 7, 2021	0.27
175	2	"Rap Battle"	October 14, 2021	0.23
176	3	"Public Enemies"	October 21, 2021	0.27
177	4	"Drop it Like It's T.H.O.T."	October 28, 2021	0.27
178	5	"Speak of the Devil"	November 4, 2021	0.26
179	6	"High on Mally"	November 11, 2021	0.30
180	7	"Diss-Respect"	November 18, 2021	0.28
181	8	"Breaking the Cycle"	December 2, 2021	0.20
182	9	"All Lies On Me"	December 9, 2021	0.26
183	10	"Put a Ring On It?"	December 16, 2021	0.29

=== Season 19 (2022) ===
No. overall	No. in season	Title	Original release date	US viewers (millions)
Hip Hop Edition 5
184	1	"Welcome to Boot Camp"	March 31, 2022	0.33
185	2	"That's a Rap"	April 7, 2022	0.32
186	3	"Poison Envy"	April 14, 2022	0.29
187	4	"All Shook Up"	April 21, 2022	0.32
188	5	"Fail to Communicate"	April 28, 2022	0.30
189	6	"50 Shades of K"	May 5, 2022	0.36
190	7	"Diss-Respectful"	May 12, 2022	0.32
191	8	"Hard Knock Life"	May 19, 2022	0.27
192	9	"Liar, Liar?"	May 26, 2022	0.32
193	10	"Shoulda Put a Ring On It"	June 2, 2022	0.38
