= Black Cocaine (Margeaux EP) =

EP by Margeaux
- Released: October 12, 2017
- Recorded: 2016
- Genres: Electronic; hip hop
- Length: 12:57
- Label: HOFM
- Producer: Jaakko Manninen

Margeaux chronology
Animal House (2010)	Black Cocaine (2017)

Singles from Black Cocaine
- 1. "Bad Chick" Released: June 14, 2017

Black Cocaine is the second EP by Canadian singer-songwriter Margeaux. It was released on October 12, 2017. The lead single, "Bad Chick", was released on June 14, 2017.

== Track listing ==
Black Cocaine
No.	Title	Writer(s)	Producer(s)	Length
1.	"Bad Chick"	Margo Simms	Jaakoo Manninen	3:16
2.	"Black Cocaine"	Simms	Manninen	3:08
3.	"Insane"	Simms	Manninen	3:37
4.	"Killer Cops"	Simms	Manninen	2:56
Total length:				12:57

== Release history ==
Region	Date	Format	Label	Ref.
Worldwide	October 12, 2017	Digital download	HOFM	
