= Marriage Boot Camp =

American reality television series

- Also known as: Marriage Boot Camp: Bridezillas; Marriage Boot Camp: Reality Stars; Marriage Boot Camp: Reality Stars - Family Edition; Marriage Boot Camp: Hip Hop Edition
- Genre: Reality
- Country of origin: United States
- Original language: English
- No. of seasons: 19
- No. of episodes: 193 (list of episodes)

Production
- Executive producers: Adam Freeman; Adam Reed; Lauren P. Gellert; Leslie Grief; Erin Kelly; Antonia Mattia; Moriah Muse; Suzanne Murch; Jim Carroll; Elizabeth Carroll
- Running time: 42 minutes
- Production companies: Thinkfactory Media; September Films

Original release
- Network: We TV
- Release: May 31, 2013 – June 2, 2022

Related
- Bridezillas

Marriage Boot Camp (also known as Marriage Boot Camp: Bridezillas, Marriage Boot Camp: Reality Stars, Marriage Boot Camp: Reality Stars - Family Edition and Marriage Boot Camp: Hip Hop Edition) is an American reality television series which debuted on May 31, 2013, on WE TV. It is a spin-off of Bridezillas and is based on the Marriage Boot Camp non-profit seminar created by Jim Carroll in 1994. It was announced on August 1, 2013, that the series had been renewed for a ten-episode second season. Production began in late 2013. Season 2 dropped Bridezillas from the title, and premiered on March 7, 2014.

The fifteenth season of the series (the fourth season of Marriage Boot Camp: Reality Stars - Family Edition) premiered on October 11, 2019.

On January 8, 2020, it was announced that the sixteenth season of the series (the second season of Marriage Boot Camp: Hip Hop Edition) would premiere on February 6, 2020.

On May 20, 2020, it was announced that the seventeenth season of the series (the third season of Marriage Boot Camp: Hip Hop Edition) would premiere on July 2, 2020.

== Synopsis ==
The first two seasons of Marriage Boot Camp chronicle the lives of five couples from previous seasons of Bridezillas as they move into one house together for approximately ten days in order to save their marital bonds. Following the second season, the show chronicles the lives of five couples from various reality shows. The couples do a number of exercises to see if their marriages are worth saving. In the end, the couples decide if they should divorce or make up. Leading the program for the first seven seasons is marriage counselor team Jim Carroll and his wife Elizabeth.

== Cast ==
=== Marriage Boot Camp: Bridezillas Cast ===
==== Season 1 – Marriage Boot Camp: Bridezillas ====
- Danni and Marlon Starr
- Kirsten and Seth Walker
- Melissa and Chris Moore
- Porsha and Byron Martin
- Remy (Reham) and Rob Maaddi
- Hosts and Counselors: Jim Carroll, Elizabeth Carroll, David Bishop, Dana Hamman

==== Season 2 – Marriage Boot Camp: Bridezillas 2 ====
- Blanca and Julian Lujan
- Mai-Lee and Tomas Acea
- Gloria and Mark Darrington
- Sofia and Shaun Sulligan
- Tasha Daniel and Jeff Webster
- Hosts and Counselors: Jim Carroll, Elizabeth Carroll, Bobby Davis and Ilsa Norman

=== Marriage Boot Camp: Reality Stars Cast ===
==== Season 3 – Marriage Boot Camp: Reality Stars ====
- Jennifer "JWoww" Farley and Roger Mathews (from Jersey Shore and Snooki & Jwoww)
- Traci Braxton and Kevin Surratt (from Braxton Family Values)
- Tanisha Thomas and Clive Muir (from Bad Girls Club, Tanisha Gets Married and Celebrity Fit Club)
- Gretchen Rossi and Slade Smiley (from The Real Housewives of Orange County)
- Ryan and Trista Sutter (from The Bachelor, The Bachelorette and Dancing with the Stars)
- Hosts and Counselors: Jim Carroll, Elizabeth Carroll, Bobby Davis and Ilsa Norman

==== Season 4 – Marriage Boot Camp: Reality Stars 2 ====
- Natalie Nunn and Jacob Payne (from Bad Girls Club and Celebrity Big Brother UK)
- Spencer Pratt and Heidi Montag (from The Hills, I'm a Celebrity...Get Me Out of Here!, Famous Food and Celebrity Big Brother UK)
- Syleena Johnson and Kiwane Garris (from R&B Divas: Atlanta)
- Tyson Apostol and Rachel Foulger (from Survivor)
- Aviva and Reid Drescher (from The Real Housewives of New York City)
- Hosts and Counselors: Jim Carroll, Elizabeth Carroll, David Bishop and Ilsa Norman

==== Season 5 – Marriage Boot Camp: Reality Stars 3 ====
- Aubrey O'Day and Travis Garland (from Making the Band, All About Aubrey, The Celebrity Apprentice and Celebrity Big Brother UK)
- Michael "The Situation" Sorrentino and Lauren Pesce (from Jersey Shore, The Sorrentinos, Dancing with the Stars and Celebrity Big Brother UK)
- Tami Roman and Reggie Youngblood (from The Real World and Basketball Wives)
- Jeff Schroeder and Jordan Lloyd (from Big Brother and The Amazing Race)
- Kendra Wilkinson and Hank Baskett (from The Girls Next Door, Kendra, Kendra on Top, I'm a Celebrity...Get Me Out of Here! and Dancing with the Stars)
- Hosts and Counselors: Jim Carroll, Elizabeth Carroll, David Bishop and Ilsa Norman

==== Season 6 - Marriage Boot Camp: Reality Stars 4 ====
- June "Mama June" Shannon and Mike "Sugar Bear" Thompson (from Here Comes Honey Boo Boo)
- Sarah Oliver and Jimmy "Inkman/Ink" Coney (from Bad Girls Club)
- Sundy and Cedric Carter (from Basketball Wives LA)
- Benzino and Althea Heart (from Love & Hip Hop: Atlanta)
- Sean Lowe and Catherine Giudici (from The Bachelor and Dancing with the Stars)
- Hosts and Counselors: Jim Carroll, Elizabeth Carroll, David Bishop and Ilsa Norman

==== Season 7 - Marriage Boot Camp: Reality Stars 5 ====
- Tara Reid and Dean May (from Taradise and Celebrity Big Brother UK)
- Lisa D'Amato and Adam Friedman (from America's Next Top Model and Celebrity Rehab)
- Michelle Money and Cody Sattler (from The Bachelor, The Bachelorette, Bachelor Pad and Bachelor in Paradise)
- Toya and Mickey "Memphitz" Wright (from Tiny and Toya and Toya: A Family Affair)
- Brittish Williams and Lorenzo Gordon (from Basketball Wives LA)
- Hosts and Counselors: Jim Carroll, Elizabeth Carroll, David Bishop and Ilsa Norman

==== Season 8 - Marriage Boot Camp: Reality Stars 6 ====
- Jade Roper and Tanner Tolbert (from The Bachelor, The Bachelorette and Bachelor in Paradise)
- Keke Wyatt and Michael Ford (from R&B Divas: Atlanta)
- Amber Marchese and Jim Marchese (from The Real Housewives of New Jersey)
- Karen Gravano and Giovan "Storm" (from Mob Wives)
- Margeaux, Merika Palmiste and Nikko London (from Love & Hip Hop: Atlanta)
- Hosts and Counselors: Dr. Ish Major and Dr. Venus "Dr. V" Nicolino

==== Season 9 - Marriage Boot Camp: Reality Stars 7 ====
- Ashley Hebert and J.P. Rosenbaum (from The Bachelorette)
- Amy Duggar and Dillon King (from 19 Kids and Counting)
- PreMadonna and Buck Thomas (from Love & Hip Hop: Atlanta)
- Gabrielle Victor and Victor Tarrats (from Bad Girls Club)
- Renee Graziano and Joey Gambino (from Mob Wives and Celebrity Big Brother UK)
- Hosts and Counselors: Dr. Ish Major and Dr. Venus "Dr. V" Nicolino

==== Season 11 - Marriage Boot Camp: Reality Stars 8 ====
- Kailyn Lowry and Javi Marroquin (from 16 and Pregnant and Teen Mom 2)
- Mehgan James and DeAndre Perry (from Bad Girls Club and Basketball Wives LA)
- JJ Lane and Juelia Kinney (from Bachelor in Paradise)
- Asifa Mirza and Bobby Panahi (from Shahs of Sunset)
- Amina Buddafly, Peter Gunz and Tara Wallace (from Love & Hip Hop: New York)
- Hosts and Counselors: Dr. Ish Major and Dr. Venus "Dr. V" Nicolino

=== Marriage Boot Camp: Reality Stars - Family Edition Cast ===
==== Season 10 – Marriage Boot Camp: Reality Stars - Family Edition ====
- Chad "Ochocinco" and Paula Johnson (from Ochocinco: The Ultimate Catch and Dancing with the Stars)
- Michael "The Situation", Marc and Frank "Maximo" Sorrentino (from Jersey Shore, The Sorrentinos, Dancing with the Stars and Celebrity Big Brother UK)
- Kendra and Patti Wilkinson (from The Girls Next Door, Kendra, Kendra on Top, I'm a Celebrity...Get Me Out of Here! and Dancing with the Stars)
- Farrah, Debra and Michael Abraham (from 16 and Pregnant, Teen Mom and Celebrity Big Brother UK)
- Hosts and Counselors: Dr. Ish Major and Dr. Venus "Dr. V" Nicolino

==== Season 12 – Marriage Boot Camp: Reality Stars - Family Edition 2 ====
- Brandi and Guy Glanville (from The Real Housewives of Beverly Hills, Celebrity Big Brother U.S., Celebrity Big Brother UK and The Apprentice)
- Renee, Jenniffer and Lana Graziano (from Mob Wives and Celebrity Big Brother UK)
- Jim Jones, Chrissy Lampkin and Nancy "Mama Jones" Jones (from Love & Hip Hop: New York, Chrissy & Mr. Jones and Jim & Chrissy: Vow or Never)
- Amber, Tonya Portwood, and Matt Baier (from 16 and Pregnant and Teen Mom)
- Hosts and Counselors: Dr. Ish Major and Dr. Venus "Dr. V" Nicolino

==== Season 13 - Marriage Boot Camp: Reality Stars - Family Edition 3 ====
- Aubrey O'Day and Pauly D (from Making the Band, All About Aubrey, The Celebrity Apprentice, Jersey Shore, Famously Single and Celebrity Big Brother UK)
- Kim Richards and Wynn Katz (from The Real Housewives of Beverly Hills)
- Desiree Hartsock and Chris Siegfried (from The Bachelorette)
- Quani Robinson and Paul "Puma" Robinson (from Black Ink Crew)
- Momma Dee and Ernest Bryant (from Love & Hip Hop: Atlanta)
- Hosts and Counselors: Dr. Ish Major and Dr. Venus "Dr. V" Nicolino

==== Season 15 – Marriage Boot Camp: Reality Stars - Family Edition 4 ====
- Aaron and Jane Carter (from House of Carters)
- Alexis and Penelope Bellino (from The Real Housewives of Orange County)
- Laura, Gloria and Michael Govan (from Basketball Wives LA and The Next :15)
- Corey, Eden and Courtney Feldman (from The Two Coreys)
- Hosts and Counselors: Dr. Ish Major and Dr. Venus "Dr. V" Nicolino

=== Marriage Boot Camp: Hip Hop Edition Cast ===
==== Season 14 - Marriage Boot Camp: Hip Hop Edition ====
- Waka Flocka Flame and Tammy Rivera (from Love & Hip Hop: Atlanta)
- Lil' Mo and Karl Dargan (from Love & Hip Hop: New York and R&B Divas: Los Angeles)
- Lil' Fizz and Tiffany Campbell (from Love & Hip Hop: Hollywood)
- Soulja Boy and Nia Riley (from Love & Hip Hop: Hollywood)
- Jessica "Dimepiece" Chatman-Williams and Shawne Williams (from Love & Hip Hop: Atlanta)
- Hosts and Counselors: Dr. Ish Major and Dr. Venus "Dr. V" Nicolino

==== Season 16 - Marriage Boot Camp: Hip Hop Edition 2 ====
- Cee-Lo Green and Shani James
- Styles P and Adjua Styles
- Michel'le and Robert "Stew" Stewart (from R&B Divas: Los Angeles)
- Bianca Bonnie and Mustafaa "Chozus" (from Love & Hip Hop: New York)
- Joseline Hernandez and Robin "DJ Ballistic Beats" Ingouma (from Love & Hip Hop: Atlanta and Love & Hip Hop: Miami)
- Hosts and Counselors: Dr. Ish Major and Judge Lynn Toler

==== Season 17 - Marriage Boot Camp: Hip Hop Edition 3 ====
- Tahiry Jose and Vado (from Love & Hip Hop: New York)
- Willie Taylor and Shanda Denyce (from Love & Hip Hop: Hollywood)
- Kurupt and Toni Calvert
- Phaedra Parks (from The Real Housewives of Atlanta) and Medina Islam
- Hazel E. (from Love & Hip Hop: Hollywood) and De'Von Waller
- Host and Counselors: Dr. Ish Major and Judge Lynn Toler

==== Season 18 - Marriage Boot Camp: Hip Hop Edition 4 ====
- Amber Laura and Miles Brock (from Love & Hip Hop: Hollywood)
- Mally Mall (from Love & Hip Hop: Hollywood) and Tresure Price (from Love & Hip Hop: Atlanta)
- Noreaga and Neri Santiago (from Love & Hip Hop: Miami)
- Monie Love and Tuff
- Host and Counselors: Dr. Ish Major and Judge Lynn Toler

==== Season 19 - Marriage Boot Camp: Hip Hop Edition 5 ====
- K. Michelle and Kastan Sims (from Love & Hip Hop: Hollywood)
- Mariahlynn and Rich Dollaz (from Love & Hip Hop: New York)
- Lyrica Anderson and A1 Bentley (from Love & Hip Hop: Hollywood)
- Gangsta Boo (from Three 6 Mafia) and Emmett Flores
- Host and Counselors: Dr. Ish Major and Judge Lynn Toler

== International broadcast ==
Marriage Boot Camp: Bridezillas premiered with double episodes in Australia on 9 May 2015 on Arena. and Marriage Boot Camp: Reality Stars began on 27 June 2015 on the same channel. In the UK, Marriage Boot Camp: Reality Stars premiered in May 2016 on ITVBe, while the Marriage Boot Camp: Bridezillas (title changed to Bridezillas: The Boot Camp) began airing on 18 June 2016 on the same channel.
