= Venus Nicolino =

American doctor and author (born 1972)

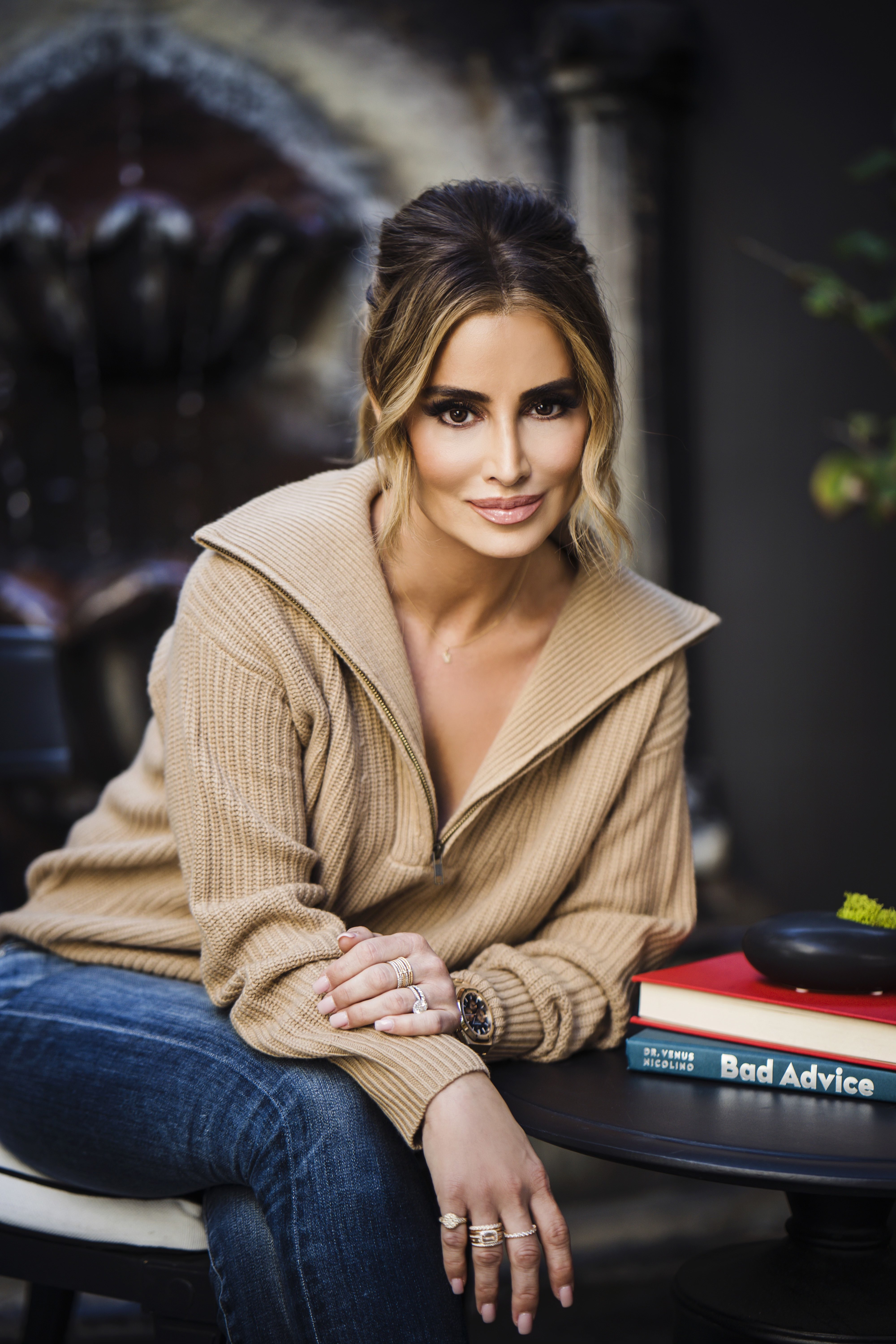
- Dr. V in 2020
- Born: March 14, 1972 (age 54); United States
- Other name: Dr. V
- Education: New York University, BA, MA; CSPP, MA, PhD
- Medical career
- Profession: Clinical psychology
- Institutions: Mt. Sinai; USC

Venus Nicolino, known on television as Dr. V, is an American media personality, author and doctor of clinical psychology. Her first book, Bad Advice: How to Survive and Thrive in an Age of Bullshit appeared on USA Today's National Bestseller List and debuted at number one on the LA Times Bestseller List for Hardcover Nonfiction. Dr. V is the host of Marriage Boot Camp: Reality Stars on We TV. She began hosting the show in its sixth season and has also appeared in a reality television series on Bravo, L.A. Shrinks.

== TV career ==
Dr. V began hosting Marriage Boot Camp: Reality Stars in its sixth season. She is also the host of the spin-off Marriage Boot Camp: Family Edition. The thirteenth season of the show aired on August 9, 2019.

Beginning with L.A. Shrinks in 2013, Dr. V appeared on other television shows, including Real Housewives of New Jersey, Millionaire Matchmaker and Marriage Boot Camp: Reality Stars and as a recurring guest on Watch What Happens Live, The Dr. Oz Show, The Doctors, MeTime with Frangela, Access Live, and Rachael Ray. She is also a revolving panelist on Steve.

Dr. V is a proponent of balanced diets, exercise, and healthy eating.

L.A. Shrinks producers described her as "sharp tongued with a mind to match", and said that she "serves up the sass" while being empathic with her clients.

Critic Robert Lloyd in the Los Angeles Times wrote that the show felt "uncomfortably contrived", and that Nicolino appeared to be "auditioning here for a show of her own"; Lloyd criticized the show for overemphasizing pop-culture topics such as sex. However, A Bella LA interview observed that "Dr. V’s edgy and humorous yet philosophical take on "How to Human" has made her an audience favorite."
