= Bridezillas =

American reality television series

- Genre: Reality
- Narrated by: Mindy Burbano; Jamie Zimmer; Laura Halperrin; Loni Love
- Country of origin: United States
- Original language: English
- No. of seasons: 13
- No. of episodes: 220

Production
- Executive producers: Mary Pelloni (2004–06); Jeff Collins; David Green; Laura Halperin; Lauren P. Gellert; Suzanne Murch
- Running time: 42 minutes
- Production company: September Films

Original release
- Network: WE tv
- Release: June 1, 2004 – October 11, 2013
- Release: March 2, 2018 – December 10, 2020

Related
- Marriage Boot Camp

Bridezillas is an American reality television series that airs on WE tv and debuted on June 1, 2004. It chronicles the lives of women engaged to be married, casting their busy schedules in an emphatic and sometimes humorous fashion.

The word "bridezilla" is a portmanteau combining bride with the fictional Japanese rampaging beast "Godzilla" to indicate a difficult bride. The word was first used by a Boston Globe writer named Diane White in a 1995 article about difficult brides.

== Format ==
A typical episode presents the stories of two brides-to-be, splitting time between both brides. The story begins as the bride and groom are introduced, and they describe how they first met and fell in love. The bride then explains what she has envisioned for her wedding. The remainder of the story shows the events leading up to the wedding, centering primarily on the bride's interactions with members of her family, her groom's family, members of the wedding party and even the wedding's various service providers (wedding planners, caterers, etc.). The interactions are generally negative, exposing the featured bride-to-be as uncontrollable, bullying, emotional and using whatever means necessary to get what she wants. The story ends with the wedding, the reception and a final concluding interview with the now-wedded couple.

Episodes are intended to run in sequence, as a single bride's story is told over two episodes. For example, the start of Bride B's story will be presented in tandem with the conclusion of Bride A's story. On the next sequential episode, Bride B's story concludes while Bride C's story begins.

== Production ==
In 2003, filming began on the first season for a show initially entitled Manhattan Brides, with the premise that cameras would follow a majority of young, white, wealthy residents of New York as they prepared for their wedding days. However, with the completion of filming, the footage was edited to emphasize the women's bad behavior and it was renamed Bridezillas. Consequently one bride, Julia Swinton-Williamson, sued the producers for misleading her about the nature of the project. The first season was co-produced by MetroTV and September Films with the first two seasons aired on MetroTV. Fox aired a one-hour Bridezillas special culled from Season 1 in January 2004. In the summer of 2004, the show began airing on WE tv. Since the second season, it has been the highest-rated original program on WE tv.

After the first season, the show has diversified to include older couples, more ethnicities, and financial statuses, as well as filming in different states coast to coast. In the third season, the show's first male bride was introduced — referred to as "Gayzilla" - Jon Taylor Carter, who was planning a wedding for himself and his partner, Isaac in Massachusetts (which was the first US state to legalize same sex marriage).

In March 2013, WE tv renewed the series for a 22-episode tenth and final season plus a spinoff titled Marriage Boot Camp, which follows five couples who were featured on Bridezillas that have come together under one roof to save their marriage.

Episodes of the series will be offered in broadcast syndication beginning September 16, 2013, mainly from the fifth, sixth and seventh seasons.

WE tv have officially announced the return of the program for an eleventh season airing on March 2, 2018 and a mid-season premiere on June 1, 2018. On July 7, 2018, a special edition spinoff called Bridezillas: Scared Fit was aired and hosted by personal trainer Donna Sexton.

The show returned for its twelfth season on March 15, 2019.

On August 27, 2020, it was announced that the thirteenth and final season will premiere on September 24, 2020.

AMC Networks announced a fourteenth season would premiere November 18, 2025 on All Reality, a subscription-based streaming service. The narrator for this season was singer and TV personality, Tamar Braxton.

== International broadcasts ==
In the Middle East, MBC 4 broadcast the show. The show also aired on ITVBe in the United Kingdom.

== Series overview ==
| Season | Episodes | Original airing | |
| Season | Episodes | Season premiere | Season finale |
|---|---|---|---|
| 1 | 8 | June 1, 2004 | July 26, 2004 |
| 2 | 8 | June 1, 2005 | July 20, 2005 |
| 3 | 18 | June 12, 2006 | October 9, 2006 |
| 4 | 18 | June 17, 2007 | October 14, 2007 |
| 5 | 22 | June 1, 2008 | October 26, 2008 |
| 6 | 22 | June 7, 2009 | November 1, 2009 |
| 7 | 23 | June 6, 2010 | November 7, 2010 |
| 8 | 22 | June 12, 2011 | November 6, 2011 |
| 9 | 22 | June 17, 2012 | November 4, 2012 |
| 10 | 22 | May 31, 2013 | October 11, 2013 |
| 11 | 14 | March 2, 2018 | July 6, 2018 |
| 12 | 10 | March 15, 2019 | July 12, 2019 |
| 13 | 11 | September 24, 2020 | December 10, 2020 |
| 14 | 8 | November 18, 2025 | January 2, 2026 |
