= Not a Little Bit =

Single by K. Michelle

from the album More Issues Than Vogue
- Released: January 21, 2016
- Recorded: 2015
- Genre: Soul; R&B
- Length: 3:28
- Label: Atlantic
- Songwriters: Kelly Price; Elvis Williams
- Producers: Blac Elvis; Eric Cire; G-Eron

K. Michelle singles chronology
"Hard to Do" (2015)	"Not a Little Bit" (2016)	"Ain't You" (2016)

"Not a Little Bit" is a song recorded by American singer-songwriter K. Michelle for her third studio album More Issues Than Vogue (2016). It was written by Michelle, Elvis Williams, and Kelly Price, and produced by Blac Elvis. The track was released on January 21, 2016, as the lead single from the album through Atlantic Records. It was later serviced to rhythmic contemporary radio. Backed by a piano, the soul and R&B song draws some influences from 1990s rhythm and blues, with lyrics about moving on from a difficult relationship.

The song samples "Love, Need and Want You" by American singer Patti LaBelle. "Not a Little Bit" received widespread acclaim from social media outlets. An accompanying video directed by Alan Ferguson was released on March 25, 2016. Michelle performed the track on The Wendy Williams Show. She also performed it during her Hello Kimberly Tour (2016). "Not a Little Bit" was nominated for the BET Her Award at the BET Awards 2016.

== Background ==
In an interview with Billboard's Adelle Platon, K. Michelle said that the song is "about those last steps that a person takes after a breakup: when you can acknowledge the importance of the relationship but also see that you're better off alone." She also said, "It's about taking your power back as a woman so you can stand strong as a single person, without regret." Michelle shared a preview of the song via her Instagram account. On January 21, 2016, she released "Not a Little Bit" as the lead single from her album More Issues Than Vogue. "It's in the name," Michelle said regarding the album. "The title means we all have issues. There are a lot of issues of Vogue, but I have more issues than anybody. The first time I heard the phrase I laughed out loud because it fit me so well. Every song focuses on one of those issues. This ties everything together."

== Critical reception ==
Writing for HotNewHipHop, Kevin Goddard wrote: "Kicking off the album campaign, the R&B singer decides to come through tonight and share her new single called "Not A Little Bit"." He addedː "Going over the piano-laced production, K Michelle delivers a heartfelt ballad that finds her singing about moving on from her past relationship and not looking back." Rap-Up added to their blog "K. Michelle is back. The Memphis songstress makes her triumphant return on her soulful new single "Not a Little Bit." Over a piano instrumental, she sings about moving on from a relationship and not looking back." Vibe praised "the piano-drenched mid-tempo single", noting how "K sings of finding the good in goodbye and realizing she's better off alone." The song was applauded by Idolator as "a welcome return to the music scene" for K. Michelle, adding, "The first taste of the R&B diva's third LP is a soulful ballad that showcases her powerful pipes and fiery attitude." While reviewing the video, Ni'Kesia Pannell of This Is RnB described the song as a "soulful woman empowerment tune". Elle Breezy of Singersroom gave the song a positive review, saying that Michelle showed that there is "life after a tough breakup" and also said that the pre-chorus seemed very relatable.

The Navigator praised the song and said it is "the perfect example when I say that this is true, pure, classic R&B. This song took me back to the early 2000s. If K. Michelle came out ten years ago, when this style of music dominated the charts and reality shows weren't about who could get into the most fights per episode, she'd be a legend by now. There's no doubt in my mind about that." Michael Cragg of The Guardian said that Michelle channeled early Mary J. Blige on the song. Anna Gaca from Spin described the song as a "moving on-ballad".

== Music video ==
=== Background and release ===
The accompanying music video for "Not a Little Bit" was directed by Alan Ferguson. It was shot in Atlanta, Georgia The video features K. Michelle walking, bathing, and even drinking Jack Daniels in the rain as she reflects on her bad relationship. But soon, she steps out of the rain into a sunnier, new phase in life, allowing the rain to follow her ex instead. Michelle first shared a behind-the-scenes shoot from the music video on Instagram on March 11, 2016. The music video was released on YouTube on March 25, 2016.

=== Plot and synopsis ===
Michelle in the video walking away from her love interest's house.

The music video begins with Michelle walking down the streets in the downtown of Atlanta. Michelle then notices a storm cloud appearing as she looks up and pulls out an umbrella to hold on top of her head as it rains. At home, she and her lover talk while sitting at the dining table, admiral blue light shining in from the back window. She stands up and gives him a kiss. Wearing a silver bathrobe, she walks toward him in the kitchen and shoves his phone in his face, demanding to know the real name of the contact listed. He says nothing and walks to the back of the window. Michelle is shown wearing a black dress in a beige background with rain pouring as she is singing and dancing throughout the video. During the second verse, Michelle walks into her living room and sits down on the couch as she pulls out a bottle of Jack Daniel's whiskey and pours it into a cup. As she is drinking, she looks at a picture of her and her ex lover. Another rain cloud comes into the ceiling of the living room and begins pouring over her head as she is sitting on the couch, causing her mascara to start running. She is later seen in a bathtub wearing a crown as she is singing the bridge. Michelle then walks into her living room in a white wrap dress as she packs her ex lover's belongings along with a picture of her and him in a duffel bag. She is then seen walking toward his house holding the bag with his belongings and then rings the doorbell and throws the bag on his porch and he walks out of the house as Michelle is leaving. Near the end, as she walks away the cloud leaves her behind and positions itself over her ex and rain begins pouring on him.

=== Reception ===
The music video for "Not a Little Bit" was well received by critics. Rap-Up expressed their interest of the video, writing: "The star of VH1's K. Michelle: My Life walks through the city with a cloud over her head, representing the drama in her life. At home, she confronts her man after discovering his cheating text messages.". Christina Lee from Idolator showed her admiration of the plot of the music video and described the video as "effective" just like the song itself. Virginia Lowman from Essence complimented Michelle's "drool-worthy beauty looks". Bianca Gracie of Fuse called the music video an "empowering visual" and said that it gives the song an extra dose of drama. Ken Hamm of SoulBounce said that the clip showed a bit of the creative side of Michelle, adding that it was "far and away better than most of the basic music videos that come across our timeline."

Brittany Burton of Respect said that the music video was "simple yet effective". Ebony described the video as a "heartbreak visual", writing: "As she goes through a heartbreak, in the video she turns to Jack Daniels, but not long before realizing she doesn't need him any more.".

== Charts ==
Chart (2016)	Peak position
US Hot R&B Songs (Billboard)	18
US R&B/Hip-Hop Airplay (Billboard)	30

== Release history ==
Country	Date	Format	Label	Ref.
United Kingdom	22 January 2016	Digital download	Atlantic Records	
