= Tony Gaskins =

American sports journalist

- Born: Tony Allen Gaskins Jr. March 8, 1984 (age 41)
- Occupations: Motivational speaker self-help author life coach
- Years active: 2007–present
- Spouse: Sheri Gaskins

Tony Gaskins is a motivational speaker, author and life coach. Having appeared on The Oprah Winfrey Show, The Tyra Banks Show and TBN's The 700 Club. He speaks on various topics including business, success and self-development but is most known for his love and relationship advice for young girls which has garnered him a large Facebook, Instagram, and Twitter following. In 2011, he made Under30Ceo's Top 50 Most Motivational People on the Web.

== Books ==
- A Woman's Influence (2020)
- Make it Work (2019)
- What Daddy Never Told His Little Girl (2007)
- Eight Mistakes Women Make in Relationships (2011)
- The Road to Destiny (2011)
- Notebook of Love (2011)
- Mrs. Right (2012)
- The New Guy Code (2013)
- CEO of Me (2013)
- Single is Not a Curse (2013)
