= More Issues Than Vogue =

Studio album by K. Michelle
- Released: March 25, 2016
- Recorded: 2015–2016
- Genres: R&B; pop
- Length: 46:24
- Label: Atlantic
- Producers: Ayo the Producer; Blac Elvis; Corparal; CritaCal; Danja; Eric Cire; Eric Dawkins; Eric Hudson; Foreign Teck; Hitmaka; Kelly Price; KEYZBABY; Lil' Ronnie; Longombas; OZ; Pop & Oak; Sam Salter; Sauce; T-Collar; T-Pain

K. Michelle chronology
Anybody Wanna Buy a Heart? (2014)	More Issues Than Vogue (2016)	Kimberly: The People I Used to Know (2017)

Singles from More Issues Than Vogue
- 1. "Not a Little Bit" Released: January 22, 2016; 2. "Ain't You" Released: February 12, 2016; 3. "Mindful" Released: February 19, 2016

More Issues Than Vogue is the third album by the American singer-songwriter K. Michelle. It was released on March 25, 2016, by Atlantic Records. The album was preceded by the release of the singles "Not a Little Bit" and "Ain't You".

More Issues Than Vogue received critical acclaim following its release and peaked at number two on the US Billboard 200 and number one on the US Top R&B/Hip-Hop Albums, accumulating 59,158 album-equivalent units in the first week. It also charted at number 32 on the UK R&B Albums Chart. The album was met with critical acclaim, earning a score of 80 out of 100 on Metacritic.

== Background ==
K. Michelle revealed on the second season of her show, K. Michelle: My Life and in an interview with Billboard on January 25, 2016, that she wanted to release her next album without it being an urban sound. "I want to be able to sing what I want, If I want to be able to sing country, I want to be able to show that. I want to be able to sing ballads that touch the world and not just one demographic. I’m just not going to be told that because I’m black, I have to do this anymore." The track listing and cover art was revealed on Pate's Instagram and Twitter account on February 12, 2016.

== Singles ==
"Not a Little Bit" was released as the lead single from the album on January 22, 2016. Upon release, the song debuted on the US Hot R&B/Hip-Hop Songs chart at number 18 on February 18, 2016. The official music video was released on March 25, 2016.

"Ain't You" was released as the second single from the album on February 12, 2016. The song debuted on the US R&B/Hip-Hop Digital Songs chart at number 41 on March 5, 2016. The music video for the single premiered on June 8, 2016.

=== Promotional singles ===
"Mindful" was released as the album's first promotional single on February 19, 2016. The song was written and produced by T-Pain. The official music video was released on March 10, 2016.

"Time" was released as the album's second promotional single on February 25, 2016.

"Got Em Like" was released as the album's third promotional single on May 6, 2016. The official music video was released on May 6, 2016.

== Critical response ==
Professional ratings
Review scores
Source	Rating
AllMusic	3.5/5 stars
The Guardian	4/5 stars

Upon its release, More Issues Than Vogue received positive reviews, scoring an 80 out of 100 on Metacritic based on five reviews. Complex gave the album a favorable review, stating that "the album is a bit less cohesive sonically than her sophomore effort, Anybody Wanna Buy a Heart? That’s not a condemnation. The last album was sadder in overall tone. Here, there is a sparkle and an easiness pronounced throughout the project. I say this as a compliment: More Issues Than Vogue gives me fusion restaurant. Like, it's still catfish, only some spiffy sauce is on it and it's kale with turkey neck meat versus collard greens."

AllMusic's Andy Kellman gave the album 3.5 stars out of 5, commenting that "More Issues Than Vogue wisely sticks to roughly the same makeup of Pate's first two albums. "Make the Bed," featuring Jason Derulo, takes a somewhat surprising shot at crossover play, but it's mostly in the production and the deployment of a melodic "oh-oh-oh-oh-oh-oh" in the background, something like the umpteenth instance of its use in contemporary dance-pop."

== Commercial performance ==
In the United States, the album debuted at number two on the Billboard 200, and number one on the Top R&B/Hip-Hop Albums, with 59,158 album equivalent units (over 54,066 in sales) in the first week, and it was streamed nearly five million times. The album also debuted at number 32 on the UK R&B Albums Chart. In its second week, the album dropped to number 23 on the Billboard 200, to begin selling further to 22,484 copies in the United States. In its third week the album dropped to number 74 on the Billboard 200 and remained for its fourth week. In its fifth week the album dropped to 145 on the Billboard 200.

== Track listing ==
More Issues Than Vogue — Standard edition
No.	Title	Writer(s)	Producer(s)	Length
1.	"Mindful"	Faheem Najm	Najm; Eric Cire^{[a]}	1:56
2.	"Got Em Like"	Najm; André Benjamin; Patrick L. Brown; Antwan André Patton	Najm	3:50
3.	"Ain't You"	Christian Ward; Jeremy Felton; Arin Ray; Drew Love; Michael Hernandez; Ozan Yildirim; James Foye III; Austin Owens	Mekanics; Oz; Sam Salter^{[a]}; Hitmaka^{[b]}; Foye^{[c]}; Owens^{[c]}	4:15
4.	"Not a Little Bit"	Kelly Price; Elvis Williams	Price; Williams; Cire^{[a]}	3:29
5.	"If It Ain't Love"	Floyd Nathanial Hills; Ilsey Juber; Rosina Russell; Patrick Hayes; Marcella Araica	Danja; Curtis Wilson^{[a]}	4:26
6.	"Make the Bed" (featuring Jason Derulo)	Lovy Longomba; Tinashe Sibanda; James Abrahart; Carmen Reece; Jason Derulo	Lovy Longomba; T-Collar; C. Wilson^{[a]}	3:37
7.	"Nightstand"	Ward; Ray; Foye; Owens; Calvin James Price	Salter^{[a]}; Foye^{[c]}; Owens^{[c]}; Hitmaka^{[a]}^{[d]}; CritaCal^{[d]}	4:20
8.	"These Men"	Kimberly Pate; Williams; Cire	Williams; Cire^{[a]}	4:29
9.	"All I Got"	Pate; Ronnie Jackson; Jesse Wilson; Williams; Andrae Alexander; Priscilla Renea	J. Wilson; Lil' Ronnie; Williams^{[d]}	3:51
10.	"Time"	Pate; Eric Hudson; Renea	Hudson; Eric Dawkins^{[a]}	4:38
11.	"Rich" (featuring Yo Gotti and Trina)	Pate; Jackson; Renea; Mario Mims; Katrina Taylor	Ronnie; Salter^{[a]}; J. Wilson^{[d]}	4:05
12.	"Sleep Like a Baby"	Pate; Warren Felder; Andrew Wansel; Sevyn Streeter; Bianca Atterberry	Pop & Oak; Cire^{[a]}	3:28
Total length:				46:24

More Issues Than Vogue — Best Buy edition (bonus tracks)
No.	Title	Writer(s)	Producer(s)	Length
13.	"Memphis"	Pate; Renea; J. Wilson; Alexander; Keith Eaddy; Reggie Johnson	J. Wilson; C. Wilson^{[a]}	3:05
14.	"Life I Chose"	Hudson; Renea	Hudson; Dawkins^{[a]}	3:35
Total length:				53:04

Notes

- ^{^[a]} signifies a vocal producer
- ^{^[b]} signifies a producer and vocal producer
- ^{^[c]} signifies an additional producer
- ^{^[d]} signifies a co-producer
- "Mindful" contains additional vocals by T-Pain

Sampling credits

- "Got Em Like" samples elements of "SpottieOttieDopaliscious", written by André Benjamin, Patrick L. Brown and Antwan André Patton.

== Charts ==
=== Weekly charts ===
Weekly chart performance for More Issues Than Vogue
Chart (2016)	Peak position
UK R&B Albums (Official Charts)	32
US Billboard 200	2
US Top R&B/Hip-Hop Albums (Billboard)	1

=== Year-end charts ===
Year-end chart performance for More Issues Than Vogue
Chart (2016)	Position
US Top R&B/Hip-Hop Albums (Billboard)	29

== Release history ==
Release history for More Issues Than Vogue
Region	Date	Format	Label	Ref
United States	March 25, 2016	Digital download	Atlantic	
United States	March 25, 2016	CD	Atlantic	
United Kingdom	March 25, 2016	CD	Atlantic	
Spain	March 26, 2016	Digital download	Atlantic	
France	March 26, 2016	Digital download	Atlantic	
Germany	March 26, 2016	Digital download	Atlantic	
