= Nikko London =

American singer

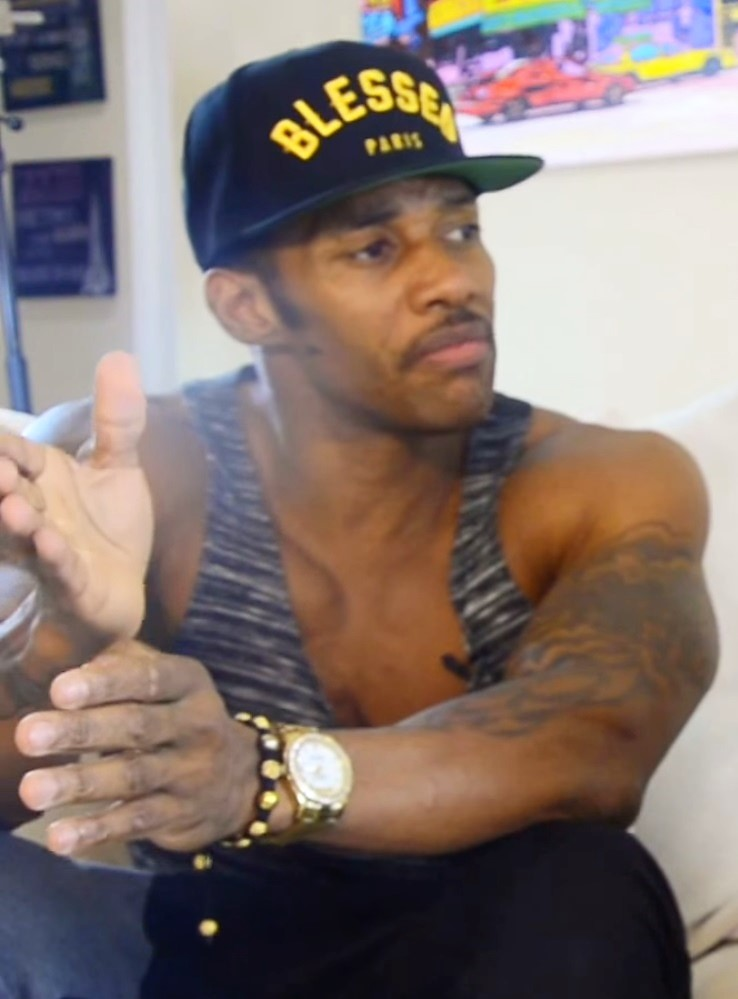
- London interviewed by Princess Halliday in 2016
- Born: Londell Smith; Brooklyn, New York, U.S.
- Other names: Nikko; Nikko Smith
- Occupations: Television personality; singer; record producer; songwriter
- Spouse: Margeaux Simms (m. 2007; sep. 2015)
- Musical career
- Genres: Pop; R&B; hip hop
- Instrument: Vocals

Londell Smith, better known by his stage name Nikko London, is an American television personality, singer and record producer. He is best known on the VH1's reality show Love & Hip Hop: Atlanta.

== Career ==
In 2011 Nikko started working on a new project with Margeaux, called Invaderz. The duo released their dubstep mixtape Just Landed in the fall of that year.

In 2014, a sex tape featuring Nikko and Love & Hip Hop: Atlanta star Mimi Faust, was released through Vivid Entertainment entitled Scandal in Atlanta. It has become one of the most popular sex tapes released by the pornography company. It was nominated for an AVN Award for Best Celebrity Sex Tape in 2015, losing out to Tila Tequila. Nikko and Faust had stated that their luggage containing the sex tape was stolen and the tape was sent to Vivid Entertainment through an anonymous source.

== Discography ==
=== Mixtapes ===
Title	Album details
Just Landed (with Margeaux as Invaderz)	Released: 2011; Label: Self-released; Format: Digital download
Forever Young	Released: December 11, 2017; Label: Self-released; Format: Digital download

=== Singles ===
Title	Year	Album
"I'm Ready Girl"	2013	—N/a
"Shower Rod"	2014	—N/a
"Exclusive (Da'Half)"	2015	—N/a
"Sexy Bad Bitches"	2015	—N/a
"Tripped Out"	2015	—N/a

== Filmography ==
=== Film ===
Year	Title	Role	Notes
2014	Scandal in Atlanta: Mimi and Nikko	Himself	Sex tape

=== Television ===
Year	Title	Role	Notes
2013–15	Love & Hip Hop: Atlanta	Himself	Supporting role
2016	Marriage Boot Camp: Reality Stars	Himself	Main cast
