= Ain't You =

Single by K. Michelle

from the album More Issues Than Vogue
- Released: February 12, 2016
- Recorded: 2015
- Genre: Trap; R&B
- Length: 4:14
- Label: Atlantic
- Songwriters: Kimberly Pate; Jeremy Felton; Melvin Moore; Andrew Neely; Christian Ward; Ozan Yildirim; Michael Hernandez; Arin Ray; Adam Woods
- Producers: Oz; The Mekanics; Hitmaka; Ayo & Keys

K. Michelle singles chronology
"Not a Little Bit" (2016)	"Ain't You" (2016)	"Mindful" (2016)

"Ain't You" is a song by American R&B singer K. Michelle. It was released on February 12, 2016, as the second single from her third studio album, More Issues Than Vogue (2016).

== Critical reception ==
The song received positive reviews from music critic's. Fuse reviewed the song stating "Ain't You" was "a soul-bearing affair, in which the singer gripes about the emotional pain and pitfalls of romance. She sings as part of the chorus: "Baby I ain't tryin' to change you" over an atmospheric beat that features a thumping snare drum." Rap-Up reviewed the song "On the honest and soulful ballad, the Jack Daniels spokeswoman keeps it 100 as she sings about relationship drama. “I done dodged so many ceremonies / Could have had 50 mill in alimony / Give you everything, what you want from me, you know,” she sings."

== Music video ==
The music video for the song premiered on June 8, 2016.

== Chart performance ==
"Ain't You" debuted at number 41 on US Billboard R&B/Hip-Hop Digital Songs on March 5, 2016.

=== Charts ===
Chart (2016)	Peak position
US R&B Digital Songs (Billboard)	14
US R&B/Hip-Hop Digital Songs (Billboard)	41
