= Margeaux =

Canadian singer, songwriter, fashion designer and television personality

- Born: Margo Elaine Simms; Toronto, Ontario, Canada
- Occupations: Singer; songwriter; fashion designer; television personality
- Years active: 2004–present
- Spouse: Nikko London (m. 2007; sep. 2015)
- Musical career
- Genres: Pop; hip hop; electronic
- Instruments: Vocals; guitar
- Website: houseofmargeaux.com

Margo Elaine Simms, known professionally as Margeaux (/mɑːrˈɡoʊ/ mar-GOH), is a Canadian singer, songwriter, fashion designer and television personality. She appeared on the VH1 reality television series Love & Hip Hop: Atlanta. Born in Toronto, Canada, she first pursued her music career in 2004. While attending Ryerson University, where she studied fashion design, Margeaux first started singing mostly on hip hop tracks. In 2005, she moved to New York City to become a fashion designer, but soon decided to start a career as a professional musician. She formed the group Test Drive with Nikko London and together they worked with producers such as Timbaland, Danja and The Runners along with DJ Khaled.

After an unsuccessful record deal with Universal, Margeaux moved to Los Angeles and began working on her solo material. She released her debut EP, Animal House, in 2010 under the name Margo. She went on to work on various music projects including the dubstep duo Invaderz, with Nikko London and joining the band Roma!, after her return to New York City. In 2015, Margeaux joined the cast of Love & Hip Hop: Atlanta.

== Early life ==
Margeaux was born Margo Elaine Simms in Toronto, Ontario, Canada. She is of Jamaican descent. Her father was a chemist and he died when Margeaux was 24 years old. She has two sisters.

== Career ==
=== 2005–09: Career beginnings and Test Drive ===
Margeaux first started writing songs at the age of 14. She later enrolled at the Ryerson University in Toronto where she studied fashion design. After finishing college, she moved to New York City, New York to pursue her career as a fashion designer. She interned with the designer Betsey Johnson but soon decided she wanted to become a professional musician and put together the group Test Drive. They worked with producers such as Timbaland, Danja and The Runners along with DJ Khaled.

=== 2010–13: Animal House, Invaderz and Roma! ===
Margeaux released her debut EP, Animal House, in September 2010 and announced that she was working on a full-length album called Gunpowder. On November 2, she released the song "Walking In L.A." – a cover version of Missing Persons' song of the same name, accompanied by a music video. In 2011, Margeaux started working on a new project with Nikko London, called Invaderz. The duo released their dubstep mixtape Just Landed on September 19.

In 2012, Margeaux moved back to New York City and in August, she joined the rock band Roma! under the stage name "Bomba!". However, she departed from the band by the end of the year. Around the same time, she started working at the nightclub and concert venue Webster Hall as a bartender.

=== 2014–present: Love & Hip Hop: Atlanta and Black Cocaine ===
In January 2014, she appeared in an episode of an online docu-series Second Skin for the website StyleLikeU. In April 2015, it was announced that Margeaux would appear on the fourth season of the VH1 reality television series Love & Hip Hop: Atlanta alongside her husband Nikko London. His sex tape with Mimi Faust was the main subject of the season. That same year, she released her single "Start a War", which she also performed on the show. In September, Margeaux announced that her EP, Yellow Dirty Rose, would be released later that month. On June 15, 2017, Margeaux released a music video for "Bad Chick" as the lead single from her upcoming EP Black Cocaine (2017) scheduled to be released on June 23.

== Other ventures ==
=== Fashion ===
Besides her music career, Margeaux has her own creative brand House of Margeaux, a clothing line and hand-painted skateboard line called Tokiebow.

== Personal life ==
Margeaux married her boyfriend and long-time music collaborator, Nikko London, in 2007. In August 2014, it was announced that she had been secretly married to London.

== Discography ==
- Animal House (2010)
- Black Cocaine (2017)

== Filmography ==
Year	Title	Role	Notes
2015	Love & Hip Hop: Atlanta	Herself	Supporting Role
