= Tammy Rivera =

American television personality

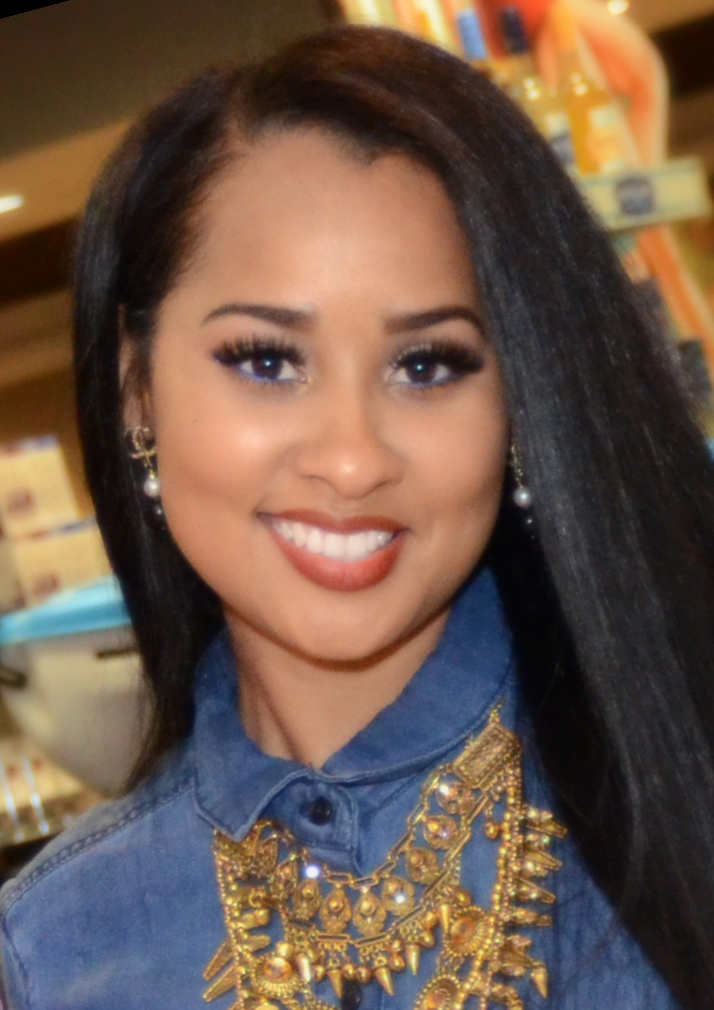
- Rivera in 2016
- Born: July 30, 1986 (age 40); Tappahannock, Virginia, U.S.
- Occupations: Businesswoman; television personality; singer; fashion designer
- Years active: 2012–present
- Spouse: Waka Flocka Flame (m. 2014; div. 2022)
- Children: 1

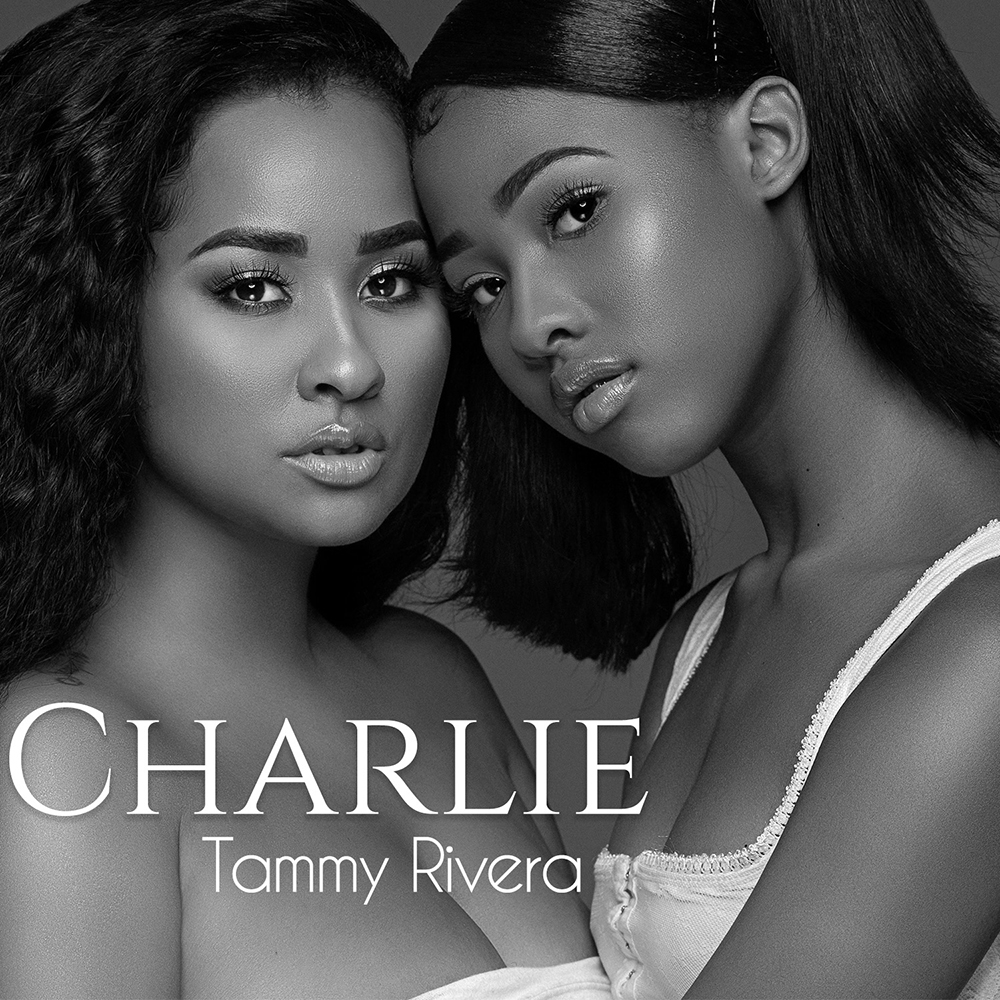
Rivera posing with her daughter Charlie in 2020

Tammy Rivera Malphurs (born July 30, 1986) is an American television personality, singer, fashion designer, and businesswoman. She is a former cast member of the VH1 reality show Growing Up Hip Hop: Atlanta.

== Early life ==
Rivera grew up in West Baltimore, Maryland. She met her father Oscar for the first time when she was 14 years old, as he was serving a 30-year prison term.

== Career ==
In 2013, it was announced that Rivera's husband, Waka Flocka Flame, had joined the cast of the Atlanta franchise of Love & Hip Hop.

In 2015, Rivera started a swimwear line, T-Rivera. The T-Rivera website claims, "The swimwear line features all sizes for women taking a fashion forward approach. Its inspiring designs & patterns are cutting edge, yet constructed to hug all those delicious curves in the right way to beautifully accentuate the female body."

On June 12, 2017, Rivera released her first single "All These Kisses".

In March 2020, WeTV aired "Waka & Tammy: What The Flocka", a look into the marital dynamic between the pop singer and her rap-star husband Waka Flocka.

== Personal life ==
Tammy has a daughter named Charlie Rivera. Tammy Rivera married the rapper Waka Flocka Flame on May 25, 2014. On October 6, 2022, Rivera and Waka Flocka Flame finalized divorce after eight years of marriage.

== Discography ==
Extended plays

- Fate (2018)

Singles

List of singles, with selected chart positions
Year	Title	Peak chart positions		Album
Year	Title	US	US R&B	Album
2017	"All These Kisses"			Fate
2018	"Only One"	—	—	Fate
2019	"Sex With You"	—	—	Conversations
2020	"Charlie"	—	—	Conversations
2021	"Babymama"	—	—	Conversations

== Filmography ==
Year	Series	Role	Notes
2014—2016–2017	Love & Hip Hop: Atlanta	Herself	59 Episodes
2015	Love & Hip Hop Atlanta: After Party Live	Herself	1 episode
2017–2022	Tales	Diamond	7 episodes
2019	Marriage Boot Camp: Hip Hop Edition Season 14	Herself	10 episodes
2019	Waka & Tammy Tie the Knot	Herself	2 episodes
2019	Growing Up Hip Hop: Atlanta Season 3	Herself	11 episodes
2020	Waka & Tammy: What The Flocka	Herself	19 episodes
2022	I Got a Story to Tell	Bree	Episode: “Before I Let Go”
