= K. Michelle: My Life =

- Genre: Reality
- Directed by: David Wolfgang; Jade Sandberg
- Starring: K. Michelle
- Theme music composer: K. Michelle
- Opening theme: "My Life"
- Country of origin: United States
- Original language: English
- No. of seasons: 3
- No. of episodes: 26

Production
- Executive producers: Mona Scott-Young; Stephanie R. Gayle; Toby Barraud; Stefan Springman; Mala Chapple; Jeff Grogan; Carmen Mitcho; Chad Gruelach; Thomas Jaeger; K. Michelle; Jeff Robinson; Susan Levison; Nina L. Diaz; Vivian Gomez; Daniel Blau Rogge
- Running time: 20–23 minutes
- Production companies: Eastern TV; Monami Entertainment

Original release
- Network: VH1
- Release: November 3, 2014 – February 6, 2017

Related
- Love & Hip Hop: New York; Love & Hip Hop: Atlanta; Love & Hip Hop: Hollywood; Stevie J & Joseline: Go Hollywood

K. Michelle: My Life is a reality television series featuring K. Michelle. It premiered on November 3, 2014, on VH1 and is the first spin-off of Love & Hip Hop: Atlanta. In January 2015, VH1 renewed the show for a second season, which premiered on January 25, 2016.

== Series synopsis ==
=== Overview and casting ===
K. Michelle: My Life chronicles the everyday life of R&B/soul singer and songwriter K. Michelle.

Several members of K's inner circle appear as supporting cast members in confessional interview segments throughout the series. They include K's best friend Paris Phillips, her "gay husband", make-up artist and hair stylist Jonathan Fernandez, night club promoter Nema Kamar and Tracie Renee, K's old friend from Memphis, Tennessee, who is attempting to repair her relationship with K after allegedly stealing money from her. The first season ended with an epilogue, with K revealing that Paris allegedly stole money from her and they are no longer friends, and that she had also cut ties with Nema and Tracee. K's son Chase Bowman, her mother Angles Pate, life coach Tony Gaskins, Arsenio Hall, Joseline Hernandez, Karlie Redd and Russell Simmons made guest appearances.

The show returned for a second season, with P. London, an aspiring rapper, joining the cast. London made headlines in 2014 when a female police officer was suspended for appearing in her music video "What's Up, Bitch?". The season featured guest appearances from K's on-again, off-again boyfriend Bobby Maze, his aunt Aunt CC, Trina, producers Pop & Oak, Safaree Samuels, Prince Mario Max Schaumburg-Lippe and Love & Hip Hop: Atlanta's Jessica Dime.

The show was renewed for a third season, with K's sister Shalah Pate, an aspiring motivational speaker and social worker, joining the cast. K. Michelle announced on social media that it would be her last. The season featured guest appearances from K's ex-girlfriend Melisia Lomax, her boyfriend Dr. Kastan Sims, high school friend Viara Iyadunni, her father Eddie Pate, her artist Gabby Green, T-Pain, Harmony Samuels, Dreezy and Big Tigger. The show ended with its series finale on February 6, 2017.

=== Cast timeline ===
Cast member	Seasons		
Cast member	1	2	3
K. Michelle	Starring	Starring	Starring
Paris Phillips	Supporting		
Jonathan Fernandez	Supporting	Supporting	Supporting
Nema Kamar	Supporting		
Tracie Renee	Supporting		
P. London		Supporting	Supporting
Shalah Pate		Guest	Supporting

=== Storylines ===
The first season chronicles K. Michelle's move to New York City and the recording of her second album Anybody Wanna Buy a Heart?. The second season chronicles her life in Los Angeles and the recording of her third album More Issues Than Vogue. The third season chronicles her return to Atlanta and the launch of her new restaurant Puff & Petals, as well as a trip to her hometown of Memphis and the recording of her fourth album Kimberly: The People I Used to Know.

K. Michelle's love life is also a focus of the show, including her volatile, on-again, off-again relationship with basketball player Bobby Maze and her romantic dalliances with Safaree Samuels and Prince Mario Max Schaumburg-Lippe. In season three, Michelle reveals her bisexuality and reunites with her ex-girlfriend Melisia. The series ends with her finding love and planning a family with Memphis dentist Dr. Kastan Sims.

== Episodes ==
=== Series overview ===
Season	Episodes	Originally released	
Season	Episodes	First released	Last released
1	6	November 3, 2014	December 8, 2014
2	10	January 25, 2016	March 28, 2016
3	8	December 19, 2016	February 6, 2017

=== Season 1 (2014) ===
No. overall	No. in season	Title	Original release date	US viewers (millions)
1	1	"New York State of Mind"	November 3, 2014	2.17
K. Michelle has a #1 record and a new place to call home, New York City. The future looks bright but a blast from the past rains on K's parade. guest stars: Chase (K. Michelle's son)
2	2	"Friends Without Benefits"	November 10, 2014	1.77
K's dream house turns into a nightmare, as old friends become new roommates. K jets off to LA to perform on The Arsenio Hall Show. guest stars: Shari (SVP Atlantic Records), Blush (songwriter), Arsenio Hall
3	3	"Chase What Matters"	November 17, 2014	2.19
K's family visits and she celebrates her birthday. Things get complicated when new tensions arise with old friend Tracie. guest stars: Angles Pate (K. Michelle's mom), Chase (K. Michelle's son), Tony Gaskins (life coach) cameo: Brian (Jonathan's boyfriend), Eddie Pate
4	4	"Body of Work"	November 24, 2014	1.68
K gets a little nip and tuck. K has an encounter with a handsome stranger at her album listening party. guest stars: Dr. Shahine, Oak Felder, Pop Wansel, Joseline, Bobby Maze
5	5	"Man Oh Man"	December 1, 2014	1.68
K performs for Jonathan to help propose to his boyfriend. guest stars: Bobby Maze, Karlie Redd, Tony Gaskins (life coach), Brian (Jonathan's boyfriend), Katie (Brian's mom)
6	6	"Take Me Back to Cali"	December 8, 2014	1.92
K returns to LA for a business trip and to confront with her son's father. guest stars: Russell Simmons, Aisha Francis (choreographer), Brian Bowman (Chase's father)

=== Season 2 (2016) ===
No. overall	No. in season	Title	Original release date	US viewers (millions)
7	1	"She's Back!"	January 25, 2016	2.25
K moves to LA to create her next album. K reunites with Bobby. guest stars: Miss Diddy (K. Michelle's friend), Trina (rapper), Danielle (Sugaring LA), Tony Gaskins (life coach), Dallas (SVP of Urban A&R / Atlantic Records), Tiffany J (A&R / Artist Management), Karen (K. Michelle's assistant), Bobby
8	2	"Take Me on Safaree"	February 1, 2016	1.90
K decides whether to be back with Bobby. guest stars: Bobby, Miss Diddy (K. Michelle's friend), Safaree (rapper/music producer), Cindy Rocker (interior designer)
9	3	"Housewarming Is Where the Heart Is"	February 8, 2016	1.85
K throws her housewarming party and finds out that Bobby is seeing another woman. P. London arrives in LA. guest stars: Miss Diddy (K. Michelle's friend), Bobby, Chase, Shalah (K. Michelle's sister), Aunt CC (Bobby's aunt), Cindy Rocker (interior designer), Erica Arana cameo: Sham Ibrahim P. London joins the supporting cast
10	4	"No Fake Jewels, No Fake Music"	February 22, 2016	1.95
K is ready to move on from Bobby after finding some of his fake jewelry. K wants to explore a new genre in her next album. guest stars: Bobby, Aunt CC (Bobby's aunt), Miss Diddy (K. Michelle's friend), Karen (K. Michelle's assistant), Oak (songwriter/producer), Pop (songwriter/producer), Dallas (SVP of Urban A&R / Atlantic Records), Rudy (K. Michelle's micro-poodle), Patrick (jewelry appraiser), Tony Gaskins (life coach) cameo: Blush, Tiffany J
11	5	"The German Prince and the Puerto Rican Princess"	February 29, 2016	1.61
K meets a royal prince from a far country. guest stars: Sham Ibrahim (pop artist), Prince Mario-Max Schaumburg-Lippe, Safaree (music producer/rapper), Joseline cameo: Bobby Trendy, Dallas
12	6	"Conquering the Bear"	March 7, 2016	1.49
K is concerned on whether the prince owns up to his word. K tries to train a bear. guest stars: Rudy (K. Michelle's micro-poodle), David (K. Michelle's dog trainer), Pacer (K. Michelle's dog), Oak (songwriter/producer), Dallas (SVP of Urban A&R / Atlantic Records), Prince Mario-Max Schaumburg-Lippe, Keith (animal trainer) cameo: Pop, Tiffany J, Blush
13	7	"Piper Takes the Pole"	March 14, 2016	1.05
K returns to Atlanta to open her new hookah bar and visit her old strip club. guest stars: Gerri (the accountant), Dr Simon Ourian (M.D.), Karlie Redd (K. Michelle's friend), Nicole (interior designer), Jessica Dime (K. Michelle's friend), Andy (K. Michelle's regular)
14	8	"The T-Pain of Love"	March 21, 2016	1.78
K's house has a break-in. Bobby wants his jewels back and K wants her phone back. guest stars: T-Pain (superstar), Dontae (K. Michelle's security), Angela (Bobby's ex), Bobby cameo: Tiffany J, Karen
15	9	"See You Tamara"	March 28, 2016	1.77
K is performing at the BET Awards with Patti LaBelle, but she'll have to share the stage with Tamar Braxton. guest stars: Miss Diddy cameo: Tyrese Gibson, Tracee Ellis Ross, Tiffany J
16	10	"London Calling"	March 28, 2016	1.57
K's new album is almost finished, but she tries to decide whether or not she is also done with America. Jessica Dime comes to town with some upsetting news. guest stars: Harmony (music producer), Jessica Dime (K. Michelle's friend), Safaree (music producer/rapper), Nelly (studio engineer), Gerrick Kennedy (L.A. Times journalist) cameo: Blush, Tiffany J

=== Season 3 (2016–17) ===
No. overall	No. in season	Title	Original release date	US viewers (millions)
17	1	"Between a Tour and a Hard Place"	December 19, 2016	1.62
K takes a break from her multi-city tour for the grand opening of her new restaurant Puff & Petals. When the opening doesn’t go as planned and Jonathan beefs with P. London, K is anything but relaxed. guest stars: Shalah (K. Michelle's sister), Mrs. Pate (K. Michelle's mom), Shema (K. Michelle's business partner), Nicole (K. Michelle's project manager), Melisia (K. Michelle's friend), Trina (recording artist)
18	2	"Finding Kimberly, Part 1"	December 26, 2016	1.57
K travels home to Memphis to escape the stress of her life and business and to spend time with her family and her boyfriend. When sister Shalah abruptly announces she’s giving up her career to move to Atlanta, K is shocked. guest stars: Angles Pate, Dr. Kastan Sims (K. Michelle's Boyfriend), Viara (K. Michelle's high school friend), Garmer (K Michelle's ex-boyfriend), Judy (real estate agent), Ra (K. Michelle's assistant), Eddie Pate (K. Michelle's dad), Chase (K. Michelle's son) Shalah joins the supporting cast
19	3	"Finding Kimberly, Part 2"	January 2, 2017	1.59
A ghost tour of Memphis scares up plenty of drama as K's high school friend Viara goes on the attack with Jonathan. K drops in at her old high school to inspire a new generation of young artists. guest stars: Theodore (K. Michelle's Granddaddy), Tanya (tour guide), Viara (K. Michelle's high school friend), Omma (Wiccan Hostess), Nicole (K. Michelle's project manager), Ra (K. Michelle's assistant), Ephraim (landlord of building), Greg (principal, Overton High School)
20	4	"Restaurant Impossible"	January 9, 2017	1.40
K returns to Atlanta and is disappointed with the progress on her restaurant, but when a team building exercise goes off the rails her staffing problems prove even worse. K babysits for identical twins and an old flame tries to break up her relationship with Dr. Sims. guest stars: Shema (K. Michelle's business partner), Melisia, Nicole (K. Michelle's project manager), Ra (K. Michelle's assistant)
21	5	"You Should Be With Me"	January 16, 2017	1.56
Things go left when K tries to discover why an old flame is trying to break up her relationship with Dr. Sims. K auditions the first act for her record label and has a tasting for her restaurant menu. guest stars: Melisia, Nilka (K. Michelle's chef), Shema (K. Michelle's business partner), Blush (K. Michelle's writing partner), Mandi (aspiring singer), Tori (aspiring singer)
22	6	"Wigged Out"	January 23, 2017	1.77
When a wig-snatching confrontation with Melisia puts her friendship with K on pause, P. London steps in to resolve the issue. guest stars: Melisia, Kaye (hydrocolonic therapist), Gabby (aspiring singer)
23	7	"Love Is On The Air"	January 30, 2017	1.44
K, high on love, rolls the dice on a departure from her signature sound with her fourth album and fixes P. London and Melisia up on some hot dates. guest stars: Eric (vocal coach), Thomas (K. Michelle's producer), Gabby (aspiring singer), Dreezy (rapper), Reggie (V103 program director), Big Tigger (V103 DJ), Melisia
24	8	"Will Puff Go Poof?"	February 6, 2017	1.40
K must decide to open her restaurant or delay further. K gets a pair of surprises; one pleasant, and one that pits two of her best friends against each other. guest stars: Gabby (K. Michelle's protege), Tobey (interior decorator), Melisia, Eric (vocal coach), Shema (K. Michelle's business partner), Dr. Kastan Sims (K. Michelle's boyfriend)
