= List of Joseline's Cabaret episodes =

Reality television series episodes

Joseline's Cabaret is a reality television series starring Joseline Hernandez that premiered on January 19, 2020, on the Zeus Network. As of November 23, 2025, 88 original episodes of the series have aired.

== Series overview ==
Season	Episodes	Originally released	
Season	Episodes	First released	Last released
1	7	January 19, 2020	March 1, 2020
Special	4	June 14, 2020	July 5, 2020
2	14	April 18, 2021	August 8, 2021
3	13	January 16, 2022	May 8, 2022
4	14	July 23, 2023	November 12, 2023
5	20	September 8, 2024	February 2, 2025
6	17	August 3, 2025	January 29, 2026

== Episodes ==
=== Joseline's Cabaret: Miami (2020) ===
Joseline's Cabaret Season 1 Episodes
No. overall	No. in season	Title	Original release date
1	1	"Welcome to Joseline's Cabaret Miami, Bitch"	January 19, 2020
Joseline returns to G5ive Miami, her old stomping grounds, where she plans to open a cabaret show. She recruits several dancers, who clash immediately. guest stars: Balistic Beats (Joseline's fiancé), Disco Rick (G5IVE manager) additional music: "Hate Me Now", "Run Me My Money"
2	2	"The Last Supper"	January 26, 2020
Joseline takes the girls out for dinner, where all hell breaks loose. guest stars: Balistic Beats (Joseline's fiancé) additional music: "Slay", "Finger Fuck a Check"
3	3	"Don't Forget Your Self Worth"	February 2, 2020
Lucky opens up about her past struggles, while Joseline comforts an emotional Jaa, who is street walking to make ends meet. guest stars: Shabazz (The OG), Balistic Beats (Joseline's fiance)
4	4	"You Can't Handle My Sex Drive"	February 9, 2020
Joseline films her music video for "Sex Drive", using it as an opportunity to teach Daisy and Chazzity a lesson for bullying Lucky and Jaa. guest stars: Xavier (director), Joshua (hair stylist), Lionel (make up artist), Jay (director), Jordan (armorer), Balistic Beats (Joseline's fiancé)
5	5	"Why We Not in the Video?!"	February 16, 2020
The girls' first rehearsal ends in violence, with Joseline having to put Chazzity in check after a heated confrontation.
6	6	"Locker Room Brawl"	February 23, 2020
With the future of the cabaret now in turmoil, Joseline turns on Lucky. guest stars: Balistic Beats
7	7	"We'll Always Have New Girls"	March 1, 2020
Joseline meets up with Chazzity and Daisy for the first time since their brawl. However, Joseline decides the damage has already been done, and decides to move on rather than go ahead with the cabaret. guest stars: Shabazz

=== Joseline's Cabaret: Auditions (2020) ===
No. overall	No. in season	Title	Original release date
SP101	-	"Joseline's Cabaret: Auditions – Part 1"	June 14, 2020
Joseline reviews audition tapes for next season of Joseline's Cabaret. featuring: Blue Face Barbie, Sidney Starr, Aqua, Lucky Hustla
SP102	-	"Joseline's Cabaret: Auditions – Part 2"	June 21, 2020
Joseline views and critiques another round of Joseline's Cabaret hopefuls. featuring: Lexi Blow
SP103	-	"Joseline's Cabaret: Auditions – Part 3"	June 28, 2020
Joseline gives her thoughts on a gothic, possibly cannibalistic dancer, and a graveyard twerker. featuring: BossTec, Big Lex
SP104	-	"Joseline's Cabaret: Auditions – Part 4"	July 5, 2020
Joseline reviews the tapes of a dominatrix, and a little stripper in a pool. featuring: Mz Natural, Chanel Tso, Jordan, Yummie P

=== Joseline's Cabaret: Atlanta (2021) ===
No. overall	No. in season	Title	Original release date
8	1	"Double Homicide"	April 18, 2021
Joseline recruits Lucky, Sapphire and a new group of girls to live with her in a mansion in Atlanta to work on the cabaret, however things get heated when one of the girls reveals that she has just aborted twins. Later, Lucky's past with Blue Face Barbie is revealed, and the two come to blows.
9	2	"Cabaret Captain"	April 25, 2021
In the aftermath of the fight, two cliques form in the house, with Lucky, Sapphire, Big Lex and Lexi Blow on one side, and Barbie, BossTec, Aqua and Chanel on the other. After Joseline rewards Lucky with the "bottom bitch" title, a jealous Barbie attacks her at the cabaret's first rehearsal.
10	3	"Work it Out or Get Out"	May 2, 2021
Joseline attempts to squash the beef between Lucky and Barbie. By the next morning, Barbie has packed up her stuff and left the house.
11	4	"Bye Bye Barbie"	May 9, 2021
Joseline is furious when she learns that Barbie has left the house. Later, after the girls struggle through Joseline's choreography, Aqua gets into a fight with production and gets jumped by Big Lex.
12	5	"You Got Me Fvcked Up"	May 16, 2021
The fight between Aqua and the other girls continues, ending with Aqua storming off set. Later, Joseline takes the girls out to the club to bond. guest stars: Manny (talent manager), Melissa (events manager)
13	6	"Meet & Greet"	May 23, 2021
Joseline organizes a "meet & greet" event with the girls, where she announces that she will be demoting Lucky from the role of "cabaret captain", and giving it to Yummie.
14	7	"A Serious Problem"	May 30, 2021
The girls confront BossTec's drinking problem, while tensions flair between Yummie and Natural. Later, Joseline demotes Yummie and makes Sapphire cabaret captain. guest stars: Rachel (pole instructor)
15	8	"Get That Crazy Bitch Out of Here"	June 6, 2021
Joseline arranges a sit-down with Yummie and Natural to resolve their issues. It backfires, and Joseline threatens to kick Natural out of the house.
16	9	"I Think You Need to Go"	June 13, 2021
The house turns on Yummie for escalating the fight between Joseline and Natural. Later, the girls open up about their traumatic pasts with a psychiatrist. guest stars: Dr. Ralph Harris (therapy counsellor)
17	10	"Show Me What You Got"	June 20, 2021
Joseline forgives Natural, but gives a stern warning to Yummie. Later, the girls are ranked ahead of their final performance.
18	11	"The Big Day is Finally Here"	June 27, 2021
The day of Joseline's cabaret performance arrives. The girls perform for Joseline a final time before she picks the top four.
19	12	"You're the Winner"	July 11, 2021
Joseline names Natural as one of her top four, prompting a meltdown from Yummie, who attacks Natural and Chanel. Joseline picks Chanel over BossTec, Lexi over Big Lex, and Lucky over Sapphire after she messes up her choreography. Joseline, Natural, Chanel, Lexi and Lucky perform "Ghetto Fantasy", with Chanel ultimately being named winner.
20	13	"The Reunion – Part 1"	August 1, 2021
Joseline, Balistic and the girls reunite to discuss the events of the season, moderated by Janeisha John and comedian Luenell. The show quickly goes off the rails when Joseline makes an hurtful comment about Sapphire's recently deceased baby daddy, before verbally sparring with Big Lex and storming off set during a confrontation with Natural. co-hosts: Janeisha John, Luenell
21	14	"The Reunion – Part 2"	August 8, 2021
The drama continues, with Balistic losing his cool and screaming at Big Lex, before Joseline throws a candelabra at her. Lex and Natural are escorted off stage, with many of the cast's beefs left unresolved by the show's end. co-hosts: Janeisha John, Luenell

=== Joseline's Cabaret: Las Vegas (2022) ===
No. overall	No. in season	Title	Original release date
22	1	"It's Vegas Baby!"	January 16, 2022
While scouting a location with Balistic for the cabaret, Joseline recruits Chanel and Lexi to manage a new group of dancers in Vegas. Things heat up on the bus ride to the first photoshoot, where Amber and Ms. Wet Wet come to blows. guest stars: Skydirects (agent)
23	2	"You're Not Needed in the Cabaret"	January 23, 2022
An enraged Joseline arrives to the photoshoot, making clear she will not tolerate any disrespect this time around. After threatening to kick out Amber, Wet Wet, Raven and "Christian porn star" Gaia, Joseline decides to give them a second chance, and the girls go back to the mansion to have drinks with Princess, Ray J's wife. During the night, more tensions between the dancers emerge, until the whole house turns on Gaia for allegedly threatening Joseline behind her back. guest stars: Princess Love (producer/reality star)
24	3	"Who Said Anything Was About Dancing?"	January 30, 2022
The girls gang up on Gaia, who has a religious meltdown and wrestles Lexi to the ground before she leaves the house. Later, Joseline puts the girls to work scrubbing floors at the club. Amber blows up at Chanel and Lexi, furious that Joseline has put them in charge. Gaia calls Joseline to apologise, and the girls are shocked when she returns as a "special guest".
25	4	"I Chose You"	February 6, 2022
Gaia shows off her moves for Joseline, but quits again when the other girls continue to attack her. The next night, Joseline picks the top four dancers for the opening night of the cabaret, eliminating Raven, BlckDiamond, Kapri, Wet Wet and Henny after the first round. Gaia returns and gives an alluring performance involving holy water which Joseline enjoys, however she doesn't think she's the right fit for the cabaret. After another round of dancing, Joseline chooses ReRe, Lollipop, Jordan and Lexi to perform with her, then surprises everyone by adding a fifth girl, Amber over Chanel. Meanwhile, tensions between Kapri and Wet Wet explode.
26	5	"1 vs 4"	February 13, 2022
The brawl continues with Wet Wet taking on Kapri, Raven and BlckDiamond in succession. Kapri's face is split open by a thrown bottle, while Diamond hurts her own arm. Wet Wet is taken to a back room by security before being attacked by Gaia, who wrestles her to the ground to try and "cast the demon out of her". After a final face off between the two, Gaia quits the show, tired of the drama, while Wet Wet is sent to stay in a hotel while things calm down. guest stars: Bigg Chris (security), Tameka (producer)
27	6	"We're Having A Pool Party!"	February 20, 2022
To ease tensions, Joseline throws a topless pool party for the girls. Raven and BlckDiamond confront Amber, Kapri and Lollipop for allegedly making fun of their dancing abilities. Later, Wet Wet returns to the house.
28	7	"Shake Something"	February 27, 2022
The top five dancers perform at the opening night of the cabaret. At the end of the night, Lollipop goes off at Lexi for keeping tips to herself. Amber discovers her dress has been sabotaged by another dancer back at the house, and vows to get revenge.
29	8	"What Did You Say?!"	March 6, 2022
Tensions rise between Amber, Diamond and Raven over Diamond's use of the word "nigga", while Joseline schools Lollipop for her attitude. The "losers" battle it out one by one for a spot in the cabaret for its second performance, before Joseline confronts Chanel for going behind her back and spilling tea to her makeup team. guest stars: Carlos (make-up artist)
30	9	"The More, The Sexier"	March 13, 2022
The argument continues, with Joseline getting physical with Amber and ordering her to her room. She decides to replace her and gives a spot in the cabaret to both Kapri and Raven. During the performance, ReRe sets her vagina on fire, while Raven is brought onstage for a special birthday performance by Joseline. guest stars: Carlos (make-up artist)
31	10	"And the Final Lady is..."	March 20, 2022
Joseline takes some time off to rest her voice ahead of the cabaret's final performance, leaving Lexi and Balistic to cast the seventh and last dancer. After eliminating Wet Wet and Henny, they choose Diamond over Chanel and Amber. guest stars: Valentino (Blume Kitchen & Cocktails)
32	11	"The Final Performance"	March 27, 2022
The crowd goes wild as Joseline and the ladies give it their all for the final Vegas performance.
33	12	"The Reunion – Part 1"	May 8, 2022
The cast (with the exception of Chanel) come together for a reunion, after beefing over social media for weeks. Joseline has been touring the cabaret with Lollipop, Jordan, Raven and Diamond. Barely after coming out on stage, a fight breaks out between Kapri and Lollipop. co-hosts: Janeisha John, Brittany Renner
34	13	"The Reunion – Part 2"	May 15, 2022
Joseline finally arrives, deeming half of the stage "losers" (Lexi, Amber, Henny, Gaia, ReRe and Kapri) who are jealous of her touring success with the other girls. Shortly thereafter, more fights break out. ReRe is attacked by Raven and Diamond, Kapri spits at Lollipop before being dragged off stage screaming, and Joseline rips into Lexi, calling her a traitor. Eventually Joseline and Amber's argument over whether Joseline can be considered black or not turns physical, and all hell breaks loose when Balistic jumps in and hits Amber. Production is shut down. co-hosts: Janeisha John, Brittany Renner

=== Joseline's Cabaret: New York (2023) ===
No. overall	No. in season	Title	Original release date
35	1	"New York, New York!"	July 23, 2023
Joseline travels to New York to open a cabaret residency. She kicks Raven and BlckDiamond off the show for causing drama and performs the first night solo, where she tearfully admits to the audience that she is performing for the first time sober. She then has an open audition night ("One Night Only") for new dancers. Old faces return, including Ms. Wet Wet, Mz Natural, Daisy, Yummy P and Lucky Hu$tla. Raven and Diamond show up but are not invited to participate, an angry Raven storms out and is confronted by Joseline, who chokes her to the ground. guest stars: Balistic Beats (Joseline’s husband), Melissa (Joseline’s friend/manager), Bonnie Bella (Joseline’s daughter)
36	2	"It's Still Up"	July 30, 2023
Raven and Diamond walk off set. Joseline returns to the club and auditions more dancers, whittling them down from 100 to 36. She plans on cutting another 20 the next round until there is 16 girls for the cabaret. Meanwhile, Natural and Yummy's old feud is revived, with Yummy threatening Natural with a blade and attacking Wet Wet. At the next round at Starlets NYC, the girls audition in groups of four. While deciding on who to pick first, Joseline threatens Lucky in front of everyone, then kicks her out. Joseline picks Holiday, Precious, Egypt and Natural as her first four to go into the house. After Natural and Joseline make up, Natural sees an opportunity and jumps Yummy. guest stars: Balistic Beats (Joseline’s husband), Andraya (contestant), Holiday (contestant), Ricardo (choreographer)
37	3	"The House is Open"	August 6, 2023
Joseline picks 12 more girls for the cabaret, including Andraya, Yummy, Abby, Dani, Spin, TeLovee, Wet Wet and Daisy. They move into a mansion in Long Island with Joseline's choreographer Ricardo. The girls quickly clash with Andraya for allegedly possessing a Voodoo doll, before another fight breaks out between Yummy and Wet Wet. guest stars: Balistic Beats (Joseline’s husband)
38	4	"Why Do You Wanna Stay?"	August 13, 2023
The girls perform Ricardo's choreography for Joseline, to determine who will join her upcoming performance at Floyd Mayweather Jr.'s fight in Miami. She picks Natural, Yummy, Andraya and Dani, and asks them to decide who should be eliminated next. Abby reveals to Joseline that she is transgender. Joseline takes a peak at Abby's "designer vagina", which leaves her in tears. The girls eliminate "Blow up Doll", "Big Mama" and "Pretty Baby", and try to get rid of Wet Wet, but Joseline overrides them and gets rid of another dancer ("Crybaby") instead. Abby, TeLovee, Ms. Egypt, Spin, Holiday and Precious are allowed to stay in the house. Lucky returns bearing gifts for Joseline as an apology. Although Joseline is against it, the other girls vote to keep her in the house.
39	5	"Practice Makes Perfect"	August 20, 2023
Lucky asks the girls for advice on how to get back in Joseline's good graces. Precious reveals she dated Holiday over a decade ago. Later, Joseline surprises the girls by showing up at their rehearsal. She still can't forgive Lucky and kicks her out of the room. As the four cabaret girls practice for their upcoming performance, a fight breaks out between Wet Wet and TeLovee. guest stars: Balistic Beats (Joseline’s husband)
40	6	"Somebody is Leaking"	August 27, 2023
Wet Wet and Egypt have back-to-back brawls with TeLovee and Daisy.
41	7	"Time to Play"	September 3, 2023
While Joseline takes a few ladies to Miami, the other cabaret girls stay back and have some much needed fun.
42	8	"Fight after the Fight"	September 10, 2023
Chaos breaks out between Joseline and a former Cabaret lady after the Mayweather exhibition fight.
43	9	"Cabaret Kisses"	September 17, 2023
From the hot tub to the bedroom, while Joseline is away the Cabaret girls continue to play.
44	10	"10 Toes Down"	September 24, 2023
Lucky is placed in a compromising position between Joseline and her friend.
45	11	"All Together Now"	October 1, 2023
Every lady gets to participate in an epic NYC performance.
46	12	"You Can Make It Anywhere"	October 8, 2023
After a successful New York Cabaret, Joseline and the ladies celebrate their hard work.
47	13	"Reunion: Part 1"	November 5, 2023
Hosts Jess Hilarious and Janeisha John hold court as The Puerto Rican Princess reunites with her Season 4 cast.
48	14	"Reunion: Part 2"	November 12, 2023

=== Joseline's Cabaret: Texas (2024–2025) ===
No. overall	No. in season	Title	Original release date
49	1	"BIG and BAD in Texas"	September 8, 2024
Joseline brings her Cabaret to the state of Texas and it’s already up the first night.
50	2	"Get Out My House"	September 15, 2024
Joseline decides to eliminate a few of the ladies.
51	3	"Wet, Wild and Up"	September 22, 2024
The ladies enjoy a pool party before throwing down at the elimination.
52	4	"Hasta La Wet Wet"	September 29, 2024
Wet Wet’s bold move gets her sent packing.
53	5	"Cabaret Ninja"	October 6, 2024
Joseline has the ladies compete against each other in an obstacle course challenge.
54	6	"Friend Or Foe"	October 13, 2024
The ladies attempt to pit Rose and Henneseyy against each other.
55	7	"Yee Haw!"	October 20, 2024
The Cabaret girls compete in a cowgirl dance challenge.
56	8	"We Brawlin"	October 27, 2024
It’s an all out brawl amongst the ladies in the house.
57	9	"X's and O's"	November 3, 2024
Joseline takes a few of the ladies to her XO Beauty Launch.
58	10	"Lights, Camera, Action"	November 10, 2024
Joseline removes one of the ladies from her music video shoot.
59	11	"The Final Performance... For Some"	November 17, 2024
Joseline performs her last show in Houston before eliminating several more ladies.
60	12	"What's The Worst That Could Happen?"	November 24, 2024
Joseline and the ladies arrive in Dallas and immediately hit the stage.
61	13	"It's Gettin' Hot in Here"	December 1, 2024
Joseline and her ladies perform before a sold-out San Antonio crowd.
62	14	"Battle Of The Exes"	December 8, 2024
Upon arriving in Cancun, Rose and Henneseyy square up.
63	15	"Save The Last Dance"	December 15, 2024
Joseline and the ladies give their final performance in Cancun, Mexico.
64	16	"Playboy Mexico"	December 22, 2024
Joseline posts for the cover of Playboy Mexico.
65	17	"In the Money"	December 29, 2024
It's an all out brawl among the ladies before Joseline announces the $50K winner.
66	18	"Reunion: Part 1"	January 19, 2025
67	19	"Reunion: Part 2"	January 26, 2025
The ladies have beef to settle after some online beef.
68	20	"Reunion: Part 3"	February 2, 2025
