= Joseline's Cabaret season 2 =

2021 season of television series

Joseline's Cabaret
- Season 2
- Starring: Joseline Hernandez
- No. of episodes: 14

Release
- Original network: Zeus Network
- Original release: April 18 – August 8, 2021

Season chronology
- ← Previous; Season 1 Next → Season 3

The second season of Joseline's Cabaret, titled Joseline's Cabaret: Atlanta, aired on Zeus Network from April 18, 2021, to August 8, 2021.

== Cast ==
List of Joseline's Cabaret Atlanta main cast members
Name	Age	Hometown
Joseline Hernandez	35	Miami, Florida
Alexandria "Yummy P" Lynn	28	Long Beach, California
Ariel "Mz.Natural” Robinson	32	Gary, Indiana
Anaiah "Chanel Tso" Wilson	26	Houston, Texas
Alexius "Big Lex" Ray	29	Colombia, South Carolina
Fonda "BossTec" Foster	35	Atlanta, Georgia
Kasie "Aqua" McCalvin	22	Detroit, Michigan
Lauren "Blueface Barbie" Woods		Miami, Florida
Lexi Blow		York, Pennsylvania
Nieja "Lucky" Howell	24	Miami, Florida
Tierra "Sapphire" Williams	34	Cleveland, Ohio

=== Cast duration ===
Cast member	Episodes												Reunion	
Cast member	1	2	3	4	5	6	7	8	9	10	11	12	13	14
Chanel	Featured	Featured	Featured	Featured	Featured	Featured	Featured	Featured	Featured	Featured	Featured	Won	Featured	Featured
Joseline	Featured	Featured	Featured	Featured	Featured	Featured	Featured	Featured	Featured	Featured	Featured	Featured	Featured	Featured
Lexi	Featured	Featured	Featured	Featured	Featured	Featured	Featured	Featured	Featured	Featured	Featured	Featured	Featured	Featured
Lucky	Featured	Featured	Featured	Featured	Featured	Featured	Featured	Featured	Featured	Featured	Featured	Featured	Featured	Featured
Mz Natural	Featured	Featured	Featured	Featured	Featured	Featured	Featured	Featured	Featured	Featured	Featured	Featured	Featured	Featured
BossTec	Featured	Featured	Featured	Featured	Featured	Featured	Featured	Featured	Featured	Featured	Featured	Eliminated (Note: Big Lex, BossTec, Sapphire, and Yummie are eliminated before the final performance.)	Featured	Featured
Big Lex	Featured	Featured	Featured	Featured	Featured	Featured	Featured	Featured	Featured	Featured	Featured	Eliminated	Featured	Featured
Sapphire	Featured	Featured	Featured	Featured	Featured	Featured	Featured	Featured	Featured	Featured	Featured	Eliminated	Featured	Featured
Yummy P	Featured	Featured	Featured	Featured	Featured	Featured	Featured	Featured	Featured	Featured	Featured	Eliminated	Featured	Featured
Aqua	Featured	Featured	Featured	Featured	Quit (Note: Aqua quits after a physical altercation with Big Lex.)								Featured	Featured
Barbie	Featured	Featured	Featured	Quit (Note: Barbie quits after expressing that the cabaret was not worth her time.)									Featured	Featured

== Episodes ==
No. overall	No. in season	Title	Original release date
8	1	"Double Homicide"	April 18, 2021
Joseline recruits Lucky, Sapphire and a new group of girls to live with her in a mansion in Atlanta to work on the cabaret, however things get heated when one of the girls reveals that she has just aborted twins. Later, Lucky's past with Blue Face Barbie is revealed, and the two come to blows.
9	2	"Cabaret Captain"	April 25, 2021
In the aftermath of the fight, two cliques form in the house, with Lucky, Sapphire, Big Lex and Lexi Blow on one side, and Barbie, BossTec, Aqua and Chanel on the other. After Joseline rewards Lucky with the "bottom bitch" title, a jealous Barbie attacks her at the cabaret's first rehearsal.
10	3	"Work it Out or Get Out"	May 2, 2021
Joseline attempts to squash the beef between Lucky and Barbie. By the next morning, Barbie has packed up her stuff and left the house.
11	4	"Bye Bye Barbie"	May 9, 2021
Joseline is furious when she learns that Barbie has left the house. Later, after the girls struggle through Joseline's choreography, Aqua gets into a fight with production and gets jumped by Big Lex.
12	5	"You Got Me Fvcked Up"	May 16, 2021
The fight between Aqua and the other girls continues, ending with Aqua storming off set. Later, Joseline takes the girls out to the club to bond. guest stars: Manny (talent manager), Melissa (events manager)
13	6	"Meet & Greet"	May 23, 2021
Joseline organizes a "meet & greet" event with the girls, where she announces that she will be demoting Lucky from the role of "cabaret captain", and giving it to Yummie.
14	7	"A Serious Problem"	May 30, 2021
The girls confront BossTec's drinking problem, while tensions flair between Yummie and Natural. Later, Joseline demotes Yummie and makes Sapphire cabaret captain. guest stars: Rachel (pole instructor)
15	8	"Get That Crazy Bitch Out of Here"	June 6, 2021
Joseline arranges a sit-down with Yummie and Natural to resolve their issues. It backfires, and Joseline threatens to kick Natural out of the house.
16	9	"I Think You Need to Go"	June 13, 2021
The house turns on Yummie for escalating the fight between Joseline and Natural. Later, the girls open up about their traumatic pasts with a psychiatrist. guest stars: Dr. Ralph Harris (therapy counsellor)
17	10	"Show Me What You Got"	June 20, 2021
Joseline forgives Natural, but gives a stern warning to Yummie. Later, the girls are ranked ahead of their final performance.
18	11	"The Big Day is Finally Here"	June 27, 2021
The day of Joseline's cabaret performance arrives. The girls perform for Joseline a final time before she picks the top four.
19	12	"You're the Winner"	July 11, 2021
Joseline names Natural as one of her top four, prompting a meltdown from Yummie, who attacks Natural and Chanel. Joseline picks Chanel over BossTec, Lexi over Big Lex, and Lucky over Sapphire after she messes up her choreography. Joseline, Natural, Chanel, Lexi and Lucky perform "Ghetto Fantasy", with Chanel ultimately being named winner.
20	13	"The Reunion – Part 1"	August 1, 2021
Joseline, Balistic and the girls reunite to discuss the events of the season, moderated by Janeisha John and comedian Luenell. The show quickly goes off the rails when Joseline makes an hurtful comment about Sapphire's recently deceased baby daddy, before verbally sparring with Big Lex and storming off set during a confrontation with Natural. co-hosts: Janeisha John, Luenell
21	14	"The Reunion – Part 2"	August 8, 2021
The drama continues, with Balistic losing his cool and screaming at Big Lex, before Joseline throws a candelabra at her. Lex and Natural are escorted off stage, with many of the cast's beefs left unresolved by the show's end. co-hosts: Janeisha John, Luenell
