= Joseline's Cabaret =

- Genre: Reality
- Starring: Joseline Hernandez
- Opening theme: "Sex Drive" (ep. 1–4); "Finger Fvck a Check" (ep. 5–7); "Live Your Best Life" (ep. 8–21); "Vegas" (ep. 22–34); "New York" (ep. 35–36); "Let's Get Right" (ep. 37-52); ”DAMELO” (ep. 52-72); ”I Like The Way You Are (Disco Shoes)” (ep. 73+)
- Country of origin: United States
- Original language: English
- No. of seasons: 6
- No. of episodes: 88 (list of episodes)

Production
- Executive producers: Lemuel Plummer; Jason L. Tolbert; Joseline Hernandez; Balistic Beats; LJ Plummer; Angelica Nwandu; Jason Thomas Scott; Tameka Stevenson; Janeisha John; Jeffrey Elmont; Diane Kimbrough
- Production locations: Miami, Florida (season 1); Atlanta, Georgia (season 2); Las Vegas, Nevada (season 3); New York City, New York (season 4); Houston, Texas (season 5)
- Running time: 40-56 minutes

Original release
- Network: Zeus Network
- Release: January 19, 2020 – January 29, 2026

Joseline's Cabaret is a reality television series that premiered on January 19, 2020, on the Zeus Network. It documents the interactions between Puerto Rican rapper Joseline Hernandez and several young women that compete to dance with Hernandez during her cabaret shows, which often involve verbal and physical altercations. Many cast members are invited back for multiple seasons, while the second, fifth, and sixth seasons see the women compete for a cash prize.

The series has aired six seasons, which are uniquely subtitled after where they were filmed – Miami (2020), Atlanta (2021), Las Vegas (2022), New York (2023) Texas (2024), and Los Angeles (2025). A four-episode audition special aired in between the first and second seasons in 2020.

== Development ==
On June 1, 2017, Joseline Hernandez quit Love & Hip Hop: Atlanta after six seasons, amid tensions with creator Mona Scott-Young and the show's producers. In January 2018, Hernandez signed a deal with We TV to star in her own docu-series, produced by Carlos King. The project, then titled Joseline Takes Miami, began filming in July 2018. On March 4, 2019, it was reported that production on Joseline Takes Miami had been stalled and that the network was requesting reshoots.

In October 2019, Joseline signed a deal with Zeus Network, a subscription-based influencer-driven streaming service, to star and produce her own projects. On October 22, 2019, Zeus released a teaser of Joseline's Cabaret. On December 18, 2019, Zeus released an official trailer.

On January 10, 2020, it was announced that Joseline's Cabaret: Miami, the first incarnation of a planned reality television franchise, would premiere January 19, 2020. Joseline's Cabaret: Miami was one of three shows featuring Joseline to air simultaneously throughout January and February 2020. She also appeared on VH1's Love & Hip Hop: Miami and We TV's Marriage Boot Camp: Hip Hop Edition.

In February 2020, Joseline announced that season two of Joseline's Cabaret would be filmed in Atlanta. In September 2020, Zeus confirmed that they had renewed the series. The show's second incarnation, Joseline's Cabaret: Atlanta, premiered on April 18, 2021. In December 2020, We TV acquired the television rights to Joseline's Cabaret: Miami and The Real Blac Chyna, which aired from April 15, 2021, albeit in censored form.

On March 2, 2021, Joseline confirmed that the third season will be filmed in Las Vegas. The show's third incarnation, Joseline's Cabaret: Las Vegas premiered on January 16, 2022.

== Series synopsis ==
=== Overview and casting ===
==== Miami (season 1) ====
Joseline's Cabaret: Miami chronicles the everyday life of Joseline Hernandez as she struggles to launch a cabaret show in Miami, Florida. The show is set in G5ive Miami, a strip club where Joseline worked a decade ago, and provides an inside look into the everyday lives of strippers. The dancers featured in the cabaret appear as supporting cast members in confessional interview segments throughout the series. They include Daisy (Seanyce Bishop) from Miami, Joseline's friend and self-professed "bottom bitch", and dancers Ms. JaaDreams (Coriana Singleton), Lucky Hu$tla (Nieja Howell), Chazzity Leslie and Sapphire Eden (Tierra Williams) from Cleveland, Ohio.

The show features interludes with original music by Joseline and her fiancé Ballistic Beats (Robin Ingouma), who is credited as the show's music producer. Midway through the season, after Joseline and Chazzity get into a brawl, the cabaret's future hangs in balance. After several sit-downs with the cast, Joseline meets with Daisy, Chazzity, Lucky and Sapphire at the club for a final "trial run" of the cabaret. Ultimately, she decides to scrap the project and move it to Atlanta, with only Lucky and Sapphire returning.

==== Atlanta (season 2) ====
Joseline's Cabaret: Atlanta is set in a mansion in Atlanta, Georgia, and chronicles Joseline's second attempt to launch a cabaret show. The show introduces a reality competition element, with ten girls living together in the mansion with Joseline and Ballistic. The top four dancers are cast in the cabaret performance, with an overall winner given a cash prize of $10,000 and the opportunity to perform the cabaret in Vegas. Lucky and Sapphire return, along with eight new cast members who previously appeared in Joseline's Cabaret: Auditions.

New cast members included Blue Face Barbie (Lauren Woods) from Miami, Aqua (Kasie McCalvin) from Detroit, Lexi Blow from York, Pennsylvania, BossTec (Fonda Foster) from Atlanta, Big Lex (Alexius Ray) from South Carolina, Mz Natural (Ariel Robinson) from Gary, Indiana, Chanel Tso (Anaiah Wilson) from Houston and Yummie P (Alexandria Patino) from Long Beach, California. Blue Face Barbie and Aqua quit the show early into the season, while Joseline rewards one of the girls with the title of a "cabaret captain", first Lucky, then Yummie, and finally Sapphire. Ultimately, Natural, Chanel, Lexi Blow and Lucky are chosen to perform with Joseline in the cabaret, with Chanel winning the $10,000 prize.

==== Las Vegas (season 3) ====
Joseline's Cabaret: Las Vegas is set in Las Vegas, Nevada with Chanel and Lexi Blow returning as "cabaret captains", alongside ten new cast members. They include Jordan Monroe (Jordan Lawrence) from New Jersey, ReRe (Rio Danielle O'Dell), Lollipop (Jeni Pollard) from Denver, Amber Ward from Chicago, Raven Diaz from Miami, BlckDiamond (Amanda) from Kissimmee, Florida, K. Kapri (Ka'Raun Hunter) from Atlanta, Henny (Genesis Castro) from Brooklyn, New York City, Gaia Love (Halla Woodson) from Tennessee and Ms. Wet Wet (Latasha Smith) from the Bay Area.

Gaia quits the show early into the season. For the opening night of the cabaret in episode four, Joseline casts five dancers, Lexi, ReRe, Lollipop, Jordan and Amber, the other girls are benched. Joseline kicks Amber off for the cabaret's second night in episode nine, casting K.Kapri and Raven in her place. For the final performance, Lexi and Ballistic add BlckDiamond to the cabaret in episode ten, eliminating the rest.

==== New York (season 4) ====
Joseline's Cabaret: New York is set in New York City. Returning cast members include Daisy from Miami, Lucky Hu$tla from Miami and Atlanta, Mz Natural and Yummy P from Atlanta and Raven, BlckDiamond and Ms. Wet Wet from Las Vegas. Raven and BlckDiamond quit the show early into the season, Lucky also leaves before returning.

New cast members include TeLovee (Natasha Jayce) from Milwaukee, WI, Ms. Egypt Beauty (Jeanette Moore) from Kalamazoo, Michigan, Andraya Alexander from Houston, Texas, Holiday Goldenchild (Olivia Bennett) from New York, Dani (Shanice Emmanie Brown) from The Bronx, Abby Molina from Salinas, California, Spin (JuneMarie Gonzalez) from Brooklyn and Precious (Jocelyn James). During the season, the girl live in a mansion in Long Island with Joseline's choreographer Richard "Rícardo" Brickus III, who appears as a cast member.

==== Texas (season 5) ====
On March 22, 2024, it was announced via Instagram by Zeus that a fifth season is in production titled “Joseline’s Cabaret: Texas” and will primarily take place in Houston, Texas, Dallas, Texas, San Antonio, Texas, and Cancun, Mexico. Previous dancers Black Diamond, Raven, Andraya, OGDaniFantastic and Ms. Wet-Wet (as house mother) are set to return.

Newcomers include Lexi Gold (Alexus Dorsey) from Memphis, Jayla The Russian Dream (Jayla Clark) form Fort Worth, Texas, Envy Erica from Los Angeles, California, Queen Envi (Dana Clark) from Chicago, Illinois, Sa'hy Isis from Saginaw, Michigan, Spicy Monii from Tacoma, Washington, Oceans (Jateaya Wright) from Miami, Florida, ShowGirlNeek (Shaniqua Hood) from Baltimore, Maryland, Des (Desiree Perez), Kay Bennis from Miami, Chinx from Houston, Texas, Fetish (Rachel Richie) from Houston, Henesseyy (Shylasia Capehart) from Bronx, New York and Rosé (Erin Davis) from Houston. It is set to premiere on the network on September 8, 2024.

==== California (season 6) ====
On June 7, 2025, it was announced via Instagram by Zeus that a sixth season is in production titled “Joseline’s Cabaret: California” and will primarily take place in San Diego, California, Oakland, California, Las Vegas, Nevada, and Los Angeles, California. Previous dancers Mz. Natural, Andraya, OGDaniFantastic, Ms. Egypt Beauty, TeLovee, Isis, Chinx, Lexi Gold, ShowGirlNeek, Envy Erica, Des, and Henesseyy are set to return.

Newcomers include ToaoJayne Doe (Jesscoyia Kline) from Baltimore, Maryland, Miss Kaniyah (Kaniyah Whipple) from New York City, New York, Skyy (Skyylie Kay) from Toledo, Ohio, G Baby (Gabriella) from Atlanta, Georgia, former professional wrestler The Hottest Flame (Kiera Hogan) from Atlanta, Gypsy Nino (Ninoshka Aponte) from Orlando and Love (Ceaira Winston) from Baltimore. It is set to premiere on the network on August 3, 2025. Henneseyy left on the first episode after altercations with Joseline, leading in her refusing to film, her face was blurred during her scenes.

===== Cast Duration (season 6) =====
Cabaret Ladies	Episodes																	
Cabaret Ladies	1	2	3	4	5	6	7	8	9	10	11	12	13	14	15	16	17	18
Skyy	APP	APP	APP	APP	APP	APP	APP	APP	APP	APP	APP	APP	APP	APP	APP	APP	APP	WINNER
Andraya	APP	APP	APP	APP	APP	APP	APP	APP	APP	APP	APP	APP	APP	APP	APP	APP	APP	ON TOUR
Dani	APP	APP	APP	APP	APP	APP	APP	APP	APP	APP	APP	APP	APP	APP	APP	APP	APP	ON TOUR
Oceans	APP	APP	APP	APP	APP	APP	APP	APP	APP	APP	APP	APP	APP	APP	APP	APP	APP	ON TOUR
ShowGirlNeek	APP	APP	APP	APP	APP	APP	APP	APP	APP	KICK		APP	BACK	APP	APP	APP	APP	ON TOUR
Egypt	APP	APP	APP	APP	APP	APP	APP	APP	APP	LEFT			BACK	APP	APP	APP	APP	ON TOUR
Des	APP	APP	APP	APP	APP	APP	APP	APP	APP	APP	APP	APP	APP	APP	APP	APP	APP	ON TOUR
Envy Erica	APP	APP	APP	APP	APP	APP	APP	APP	APP	APP	APP	APP	APP	APP	APP	APP	APP	ON TOUR
Lexi Gold	APP	APP	APP	APP	APP	APP	APP	APP	APP	APP	APP	APP	APP	APP	APP	APP	APP	ON TOUR
Chinx	APP	APP	APP	APP	APP	APP	APP	APP	APP	APP	APP	APP	APP	APP	APP	APP	APP	ON TOUR
Telovee	APP	APP	APP	APP	APP	APP	APP	APP	APP	APP	APP	APP	APP	APP	APP	APP	APP	ON TOUR
Miss Kaniyah	APP	APP	APP	APP	APP	APP	APP	APP	APP	APP	APP	APP	APP	APP	APP	APP	APP	ON TOUR
GBaby	APP	APP	APP	APP	APP	APP	APP	APP	APP	APP	APP	APP	APP	ELIM				
Toao Jayne Doe	APP	APP	APP	APP	APP	APP	APP	APP	APP	APP	APP	APP	ELIM					
Natural	APP	APP	APP	APP	APP	APP	APP	APP	APP	LEFT								
Hottest Flame	APP	APP	APP	APP	APP	APP	APP	APP	APP	ELIM								
Love	APP	APP	APP	APP	APP	APP	APP	ELIM										
Isis	APP	APP	APP	APP	APP	APP	APP	ELIM										
Gypsy	APP	APP	LEFT															
Hennessy	KICK																	

=== Cast duration ===
Color key
Appears as cast member during season in green screen confessional segments
Quits show midway through the season
Appears as a guest star during the season

Cast member	Seasons					
Cast member	Miami	Atlanta	Las Vegas	New York	Texas	California
Joseline Hernandez	Starring	Starring	Starring	Starring	Starring	Starring
Ballistic Beats	Guest	Featuring	Featuring	Featuring	Guest	Guest
Rícardo				Featuring	Featuring	Featuring
Erica Mena					Guest	Guest
Dancers
Nieja "Lucky Hustla" Howell	Featuring	Featuring		Featuring		
Seanyce "Daisy Delight" Bishop	Featuring			Featuring		
Tierra "Sapphire" Williams	Featuring	Featuring				
Chazzity Leslie	Featuring					
Coriana "JaaDreams" Singleton	Featuring					
Ariel "Natural" Robinson		Featuring		Featuring		Featuring
Alexandria "Yummy P" Lynn		Featuring		Featuring		
Alexius "Big Lex" Ray		Featuring		Guest		
Anaiah "Chanel Tso" Wilson		Featuring	Featuring			
Lexi Blow		Featuring	Featuring			
Fonda "BossTec" Foster		Featuring				
Kasie "Aqua" McCalvin		Featuring				
Lauren "BlueFace Barbie" Woods		Featuring				
Raven Diaz			Featuring	Featuring	Featuring	
Amanda "Blck Diamond" -			Featuring	Featuring	Featuring	
Latasha "Wet-Wet" Smith			Featuring	Featuring	Featuring	
Rio "ReRe" O'Dell			Featuring			
Jeni "Lollipop" Polard			Featuring			
Jordan "Jordan Monroe" Lawrence			Featuring			
Ka'Raun "K.Kapri" Hunter			Featuring			
Amber "Amber Ali" Ward			Featuring			
Genesis "Henny" Castro			Featuring			
Halla "Gaia Love" Woodson			Featuring			
Andraya Alexander				Featuring	Featuring	Featuring
Shanice "Dani" Brown				Featuring	Featuring	Featuring
Natasha "TeLovee" Jayce				Featuring		Featuring
Jeanette "Egypt" Moore				Featuring		Featuring
Olivia "Holiday" Bennett				Featuring		
JuneMarie "Spin" Gonzalez				Featuring		
Jocelyn "Precious" James				Featuring		
Abby Molina				Featuring		
Sa’hy Isis				Guest	Featuring	Featuring
Alexus "Lexi Gold" Dorsey					Featuring	Featuring
Erica "Envy Erica" Scott					Featuring	Featuring
Jateaya "Oceans" Wright					Featuring	Featuring
Shaniqua "ShowGirlNeek" Hood					Featuring	Featuring
Desiree "Des" Perez					Featuring	Featuring
Chinx					Featuring	Featuring
Shylasia "Henneseyy" Capehart					Featuring	Featuring
Jayla "The Russian Dream" Clark					Featuring	
Dana "Queen Envi" Clark					Featuring	
Mónica "Spicy Monii" Sandoval					Featuring	
Kay Bennis					Featuring	
Rachel "Fetish" Richie					Featuring	
Erin "Rosé" Davis					Featuring	
Ceiara "Love" Winston						Featuring
Kaniyah "Miss Kaniyah" Whipple						Featuring
Gypsy Nino						Featuring
Kiera "Hottest Flame" Hogan						Featuring
Skyylie "Skyy" Kay						Featuring
Jesscoyia "Toao Jayne Doe" Kline						Featuring
Gabriella “G Baby”						Featuring

== Episodes ==
Season	Episodes	Originally released	
Season	Episodes	First released	Last released
1	7	January 19, 2020	March 1, 2020
Special	4	June 14, 2020	July 5, 2020
2	14	April 18, 2021	August 8, 2021
3	13	January 16, 2022	May 8, 2022
4	14	July 23, 2023	November 12, 2023
5	20	September 8, 2024	February 2, 2025
6	17	August 3, 2025	January 29, 2026
