= Joseline's Cabaret season 3 =

2022 season of television series

Joseline's Cabaret
- Season 3
- Starring: Joseline Hernandez
- No. of episodes: 13

Release
- Original network: Zeus Network
- Original release: January 16 – May 15, 2022

Season chronology
- ← Previous; Season 2 Next → Season 4

The third season of Joseline's Cabaret, titled Joseline's Cabaret: Las Vegas, aired on Zeus Network from January 16, 2022, to May 15, 2022.

== Cast ==
List of Joseline's Cabaret Las Vegas main cast members
| Name | Age | Hometown |
|---|---|---|
| Amber Ward | 28 | Chicago, Illinois |
| Anaiah "Chanel Tso" Wilson | 27 | Houston, Texas |
| Amanda "Black Diamond" | 26 | Kissimmee, Florida |
| Genesis "Henny" Castro | 26 | Brooklyn, New York |
| Halla "Gaia Love" Woodson | 24 | Dickson, Tennessee |
| Jeni "Lollipop" Pollard | 26 | Denver, Colorado |
| Jordan Monroe | | Atlantic City, New Jersey |
| Ka'Raun "K. Kapri" Hunter | 27 | Atlanta, Georgia |
| Latasha "Wet-Wet" Smith | 31 | San Francisco, California |
| Lexi Blow | | York, Pennsylvania |
| Raven Diaz | 27 | Miami, Florida |
| Rio "ReRe" O'Dell | | Portland, Oregon |

=== Cast duration ===
| Cast member | Episodes | | | | | | | | | | | Reunion | |
| Cast member | 1 | 2 | 3 | 4 | 5 | 6 | 7 | 8 | 9 | 10 | 11 | 12 | 13 |
|---|---|---|---|---|---|---|---|---|---|---|---|---|---|
| Joseline | Featured | Featured | Featured | Featured | Featured | Featured | Featured | Featured | Featured | Featured | Featured | Featured | Featured |
| Diamond | Featured | Featured | Featured | Featured | Featured | Featured | Featured | Featured | Featured | Featured | Featured | Featured | Featured |
| Lexi | Featured | Featured | Featured | Featured | Featured | Featured | Featured | Featured | Featured | Featured | Featured | Featured | Featured |
| Jordan | Featured | Featured | Featured | Featured | Featured | Featured | Featured | Featured | Featured | Featured | Featured | Featured | Featured |
| K. Kapri | Featured | Featured | Featured | Featured | Featured | Featured | Featured | Featured | Featured | Featured | Featured | Featured | Featured |
| Lollipop | Featured | Featured | Featured | Featured | Featured | Featured | Featured | Featured | Featured | Featured | Featured | Featured | Featured |
| Raven | Featured | Featured | Featured | Featured | Featured | Featured | Featured | Featured | Featured | Featured | Featured | Featured | Featured |
| ReRe | Featured | Featured | Featured | Featured | Featured | Featured | Featured | Featured | Featured | Featured | Featured | Featured | Featured |
| Wet Wet | Featured | Featured | Featured | Featured | Featured | Featured | Featured | Featured | Featured | Eliminated (Note: Amber, Chanel, Henny, and Wet Wet are eliminated before the third and final performance.) | | Featured | Featured |
| Amber | Featured | Featured | Featured | Featured | Featured | Featured | Featured | Featured | Featured | Eliminated | | Featured | Featured |
| Henny | Featured | Featured | Featured | Featured | Featured | Featured | Featured | Featured | Featured | Eliminated | | Featured | Featured |
| Chanel | Featured | Featured | Featured | Featured | Featured | Featured | Featured | Featured | Featured | Eliminated | | | |
| Gaia | Featured | Featured | Featured | Featured | Quit (Note: Gaia quits after physical altercations with Lexi in episode 3 and Wet Wet in episode 5.) | | | | | | | Featured | Featured |

== Episodes ==
| No. overall | No. in season | Title | Original release date |
|---|---|---|---|
| 22 | 1 | "It's Vegas Baby!" | January 16, 2022 |
While scouting a location with Balistic for the cabaret, Joseline recruits Chanel and Lexi to manage a new group of dancers in Vegas. Things heat up on the bus ride to the first photoshoot, where Amber and Ms. Wet Wet come to blows. guest stars: Skydirects (agent)
| 23 | 2 | "You're Not Needed in the Cabaret" | January 23, 2022 |
An enraged Joseline arrives to the photoshoot, making clear she will not tolerate any disrespect this time around. After threatening to kick out Amber, Wet Wet, Raven and "Christian porn star" Gaia, Joseline decides to give them a second chance, and the girls go back to the mansion to have drinks with Princess, Ray J's wife. During the night, more tensions between the dancers emerge, until the whole house turns on Gaia for allegedly threatening Joseline behind her back. guest stars: Princess Love (producer/reality star)
| 24 | 3 | "Who Said Anything Was About Dancing?" | January 30, 2022 |
The girls gang up on Gaia, who has a religious meltdown and wrestles Lexi to the ground before she leaves the house. Later, Joseline puts the girls to work scrubbing floors at the club. Amber blows up at Chanel and Lexi, furious that Joseline has put them in charge. Gaia calls Joseline to apologise, and the girls are shocked when she returns as a "special guest".
| 25 | 4 | "I Chose You" | February 6, 2022 |
Gaia shows off her moves for Joseline, but quits again when the other girls continue to attack her. The next night, Joseline picks the top four dancers for the opening night of the cabaret, eliminating Raven, BlckDiamond, Kapri, Wet Wet and Henny after the first round. Gaia returns and gives an alluring performance involving holy water which Joseline enjoys, however she doesn't think she's the right fit for the cabaret. After another round of dancing, Joseline chooses ReRe, Lollipop, Jordan and Lexi to perform with her, then surprises everyone by adding a fifth girl, Amber over Chanel. Meanwhile, tensions between Kapri and Wet Wet explode.
| 26 | 5 | "1 vs 4" | February 13, 2022 |
The brawl continues with Wet Wet taking on Kapri, Raven and BlckDiamond in succession. Kapri's face is split open by a thrown bottle, while Diamond hurts her own arm. Wet Wet is taken to a back room by security before being attacked by Gaia, who wrestles her to the ground to try and "cast the demon out of her". After a final face off between the two, Gaia quits the show, tired of the drama, while Wet Wet is sent to stay in a hotel while things calm down. guest stars: Bigg Chris (security), Tameka (producer)
| 27 | 6 | "We're Having A Pool Party!" | February 20, 2022 |
To ease tensions, Joseline throws a topless pool party for the girls. Raven and BlckDiamond confront Amber, Kapri and Lollipop for allegedly making fun of their dancing abilities. Later, Wet Wet returns to the house.
| 28 | 7 | "Shake Something" | February 27, 2022 |
The top five dancers perform at the opening night of the cabaret. At the end of the night, Lollipop goes off at Lexi for keeping tips to herself. Amber discovers her dress has been sabotaged by another dancer back at the house, and vows to get revenge.
| 29 | 8 | "What Did You Say?!" | March 6, 2022 |
Tensions rise between Amber, Diamond and Raven over Diamond's use of the word "nigga", while Joseline schools Lollipop for her attitude. The "losers" battle it out one by one for a spot in the cabaret for its second performance, before Joseline confronts Chanel for going behind her back and spilling tea to her makeup team. guest stars: Carlos (make-up artist)
| 30 | 9 | "The More, The Sexier" | March 13, 2022 |
The argument continues, with Joseline getting physical with Amber and ordering her to her room. She decides to replace her and gives a spot in the cabaret to both Kapri and Raven. During the performance, ReRe sets her vagina on fire, while Raven is brought onstage for a special birthday performance by Joseline. guest stars: Carlos (make-up artist)
| 31 | 10 | "And the Final Lady is..." | March 20, 2022 |
Joseline takes some time off to rest her voice ahead of the cabaret's final performance, leaving Lexi and Balistic to cast the seventh and last dancer. After eliminating Wet Wet and Henny, they choose Diamond over Chanel and Amber. guest stars: Valentino (Blume Kitchen & Cocktails)
| 32 | 11 | "The Final Performance" | March 27, 2022 |
The crowd goes wild as Joseline and the ladies give it their all for the final Vegas performance.
| 33 | 12 | "The Reunion – Part 1" | May 8, 2022 |
The cast (with the exception of Chanel) come together for a reunion, after beefing over social media for weeks. Joseline has been touring the cabaret with Lollipop, Jordan, Raven and Diamond. Barely after coming out on stage, a fight breaks out between Kapri and Lollipop. co-hosts: Janeisha John, Brittany Renner
| 34 | 13 | "The Reunion – Part 2" | May 15, 2022 |
Joseline finally arrives, deeming half of the stage "losers" (Lexi, Amber, Henny, Gaia, ReRe and Kapri) who are jealous of her touring success with the other girls. Shortly thereafter, more fights break out. ReRe is attacked by Raven and Diamond, Kapri spits at Lollipop before being dragged off stage screaming, and Joseline rips into Lexi, calling her a traitor. Eventually Joseline and Amber's argument over whether Joseline can be considered black or not turns physical, and all hell breaks loose when Balistic jumps in and hits Amber. Production is shut down. co-hosts: Janeisha John, Brittany Renner
