= Joseline's Cabaret season 1 =

2020 season of television series

Joseline's Cabaret
- Season 1
- Starring: Joseline Hernandez
- No. of episodes: 7

Release
- Original network: Zeus Network
- Original release: January 19 – March 1, 2020

Season chronology
- Next → Season 2

The first season of Joseline's Cabaret, titled Joseline's Cabaret: Miami, aired on Zeus Network from January 19, 2020, to March 1, 2020.

== Cast ==
List of Joseline's Cabaret Miami main cast members
Name	Age	Hometown
Joseline Hernandez	34	Miami, Florida
Seanyce "Daisy Delight" Bishop	24	Miami, Florida
Chazzity Leslie	29	Miami, Florida
Nieja "Lucky Hustla" Howell	23	Miami, Florida
Tierra "Sapphire" Williams	33	Cleveland, Ohio
Coriana "Ms. Jaadreams" Singleton	26	Miami, Florida

=== Cast duration ===
Cast member	Episodes						
Cast member	1	2	3	4	5	6	7
Joseline	Featured	Featured	Featured	Featured	Featured	Featured	Featured
Lucky	Featured	Featured	Featured	Featured	Featured	Featured	Featured
Sapphire	Featured	Featured	Featured	Featured	Featured	Featured	Featured
Daisy	Featured	Featured	Featured	Featured	Featured	removed (Note: Chazzity and Daisy are removed from the cabaret in episode 6 by Joseline after gets into a physical altercation.)	Appeared (Note: Chazzity and Daisy made an appearance.)
Chazzity	Featured	Featured	Featured	Featured	Featured	removed	Appeared
Ms. JaaDreams	Featured	Featured	Featured	Featured	Left (Note: Jaa is not seen after episode 5, without explanation.)		

== Episodes ==
Joseline's Cabaret Season 1 Episodes
No. overall	No. in season	Title	Original release date
1	1	"Welcome to Joseline's Cabaret Miami, Bitch"	January 19, 2020
Joseline returns to G5ive Miami, her old stomping grounds, where she plans to open a cabaret show. She recruits several dancers, who clash immediately. guest stars: Balistic Beats (Joseline's fiancé), Disco Rick (G5IVE manager) additional music: "Hate Me Now", "Run Me My Money"
2	2	"The Last Supper"	January 26, 2020
Joseline takes the girls out for dinner, where all hell breaks loose. guest stars: Balistic Beats (Joseline's fiancé) additional music: "Slay", "Finger Fuck a Check"
3	3	"Don't Forget Your Self Worth"	February 2, 2020
Lucky opens up about her past struggles, while Joseline comforts an emotional Jaa, who is street walking to make ends meet. guest stars: Shabazz (The OG), Balistic Beats (Joseline's fiance)
4	4	"You Can't Handle My Sex Drive"	February 9, 2020
Joseline films her music video for "Sex Drive", using it as an opportunity to teach Daisy and Chazzity a lesson for bullying Lucky and Jaa. guest stars: Xavier (director), Joshua (hair stylist), Lionel (make up artist), Jay (director), Jordan (armorer), Balistic Beats (Joseline's fiancé)
5	5	"Why We Not in the Video?!"	February 16, 2020
The girls' first rehearsal ends in violence, with Joseline having to put Chazzity in check after a heated confrontation.
6	6	"Locker Room Brawl"	February 23, 2020
With the future of the cabaret now in turmoil, Joseline turns on Lucky. guest stars: Balistic Beats
7	7	"We'll Always Have New Girls"	March 1, 2020
Joseline meets up with Chazzity and Daisy for the first time since their brawl. However, Joseline decides the damage has already been done, and decides to move on rather than go ahead with the cabaret. guest stars: Shabazz
