= Joseline's Cabaret season 4 =

2023 season of television series

Joseline's Cabaret
- Season 4
- Starring: Joseline Hernandez
- No. of episodes: 14

Release
- Original network: Zeus Network
- Original release: July 23 – November 12, 2023

Season chronology
- ← Previous; Season 3

The fourth season of Joseline's Cabaret, titled Joseline's Cabaret: New York, aired on Zeus Network from July 23, 2023, to November 12, 2023.

== Cast ==
List of Joseline's Cabaret New York main cast members
Name	Age	Hometown
Abby Molina		Salinas, California
Andraya Alexander	24	Houston, Texas
Amanda "Black Diamond"	28	Kissimmee, Florida
Alexandria "Yummy P" Lynn	30	Long Beach, California
Ariel "Mz.Natural" Robinson	35	Gary, Indiana
Olivia "Holiday The Goldenchild" Bennett	36	New York City, New York
Jocelyn "Precious" James	36	New York City, New York
JuneMarie "Spin" González	27	Brooklyn, New York
Latasha "Wet-Wet" Smith	33	San Francisco, California
Natasha "TeLovee" Jayce	32	Milwaukee, Wisconsin
Nieja "Lucky" Howell	26	Miami, Florida
Raven Diaz	28	Miami, Florida
Seanyce "Daisy Delight" Bishop	27	Miami, Florida
Shanice "Dani" Brown	30	Bronx, New York
Jeanette "Egypt" Moore	30	Kalamazoo, Michigan

=== Cast duration ===
Cast member	Episodes												Reunion	
Cast member	1	2	3	4	5	6	7	8	9	10	11	12	13	14
Joseline	Featured	Featured	Featured	Featured	Featured	Featured	Featured	Featured	Featured	Featured	Featured	Featured	Featured	Featured
Mz Natural	Featured	Featured	Featured	Featured	Featured	Featured	Featured	Featured	Featured	Featured	Featured	Featured	Featured	Featured
Wet Wet	Featured	Featured	Featured	Featured	Featured	Featured	Featured	Featured	Featured	Featured	Featured	Featured	Featured	Featured
Yummy P	Featured	Featured	Featured	Featured	Featured	Featured	Featured	Featured	Absent	Featured	Featured	Featured	Featured	Featured
Daisy	Featured	Featured	Featured	Featured	Featured	Featured	Absent	Featured	Featured	Featured	Featured	Featured	Featured	Featured
Egypt	Absent	Featured	Featured	Featured	Featured	Featured	Featured	Featured	Featured	Featured	Featured	Featured	Featured	Featured
Holiday	Absent	Featured	Featured	Featured	Featured	Featured	Featured	Featured	Featured	Featured	Featured	Featured	Featured	Featured
Precious	Absent	Featured	Featured	Featured	Featured	Featured	Featured	Featured	Featured	Featured	Featured	Featured	Featured	Featured
Andraya	Absent	Featured	Featured	Featured	Featured	Featured	Featured	Featured	Absent	Featured	Featured	Featured	Featured	Featured
Dani	Absent	Absent	Featured	Featured	Featured	Featured	Featured	Featured	Absent	Featured	Featured	Featured	Featured	Featured
Spin	Absent	Absent	Featured	Featured	Featured	Featured	Featured	Featured	Featured	Featured	Featured	Featured	Featured	Featured
TeLovee	Absent	Absent	Featured	Featured	Featured	Featured	Featured	Featured	Featured	Featured	Featured	Featured	Featured	Featured
Abby	Featured	Featured	Featured	Featured	Featured	Featured	Featured	Featured	Featured	Quit (Note: Abby quits because of a family emergency.)				
Lucky	Featured	Featured	Absent	Featured	Featured	Featured	Featured	Featured	Featured	Quit (Note: Lucky quits after learning of the physical altercation between Joseline and Big Lex.)			Featured	Featured
Diamond	Featured	Quit (Note: Diamond quit during the auditions after she found out she was pregnant.)											Featured	
Raven	Featured	Quit (Note: Raven quit during the auditions after a physical altercation with Joseline.)											Featured	

== Episodes ==
No. overall	No. in season	Title	Original release date
35	1	"New York, New York!"	July 23, 2023
Joseline travels to New York to open a cabaret residency. She kicks Raven and BlckDiamond off the show for causing drama and performs the first night solo, where she tearfully admits to the audience that she is performing for the first time sober. She then has an open audition night ("One Night Only") for new dancers. Old faces return, including Ms. Wet Wet, Mz Natural, Daisy, Yummy P and Lucky Hu$tla. Raven and Diamond show up but are not invited to participate, an angry Raven storms out and is confronted by Joseline, who chokes her to the ground. guest stars: Balistic Beats (Joseline's husband), Melissa (Joseline's friend/manager), Bonnie Bella (Joseline's daughter)
36	2	"It's Still Up"	July 30, 2023
Raven and Diamond walk off set. Joseline returns to the club and auditions more dancers, whittling them down from 100 to 36. She plans on cutting another 20 the next round until there is 16 girls for the cabaret. Meanwhile, Natural and Yummy's old feud is revived, with Yummy threatening Natural with a blade and attacking Wet Wet. At the next round at Starlets NYC, the girls audition in groups of four. While deciding on who to pick first, Joseline threatens Lucky in front of everyone, then kicks her out. Joseline picks Holiday, Precious, Egypt and Natural as her first four to go into the house. After Natural and Joseline make up, Natural sees an opportunity and jumps Yummy. guest stars: Balistic Beats (Joseline's husband), Andraya (contestant), Holiday (contestant), Ricardo (choreographer)
37	3	"The House is Open"	August 6, 2023
Joseline picks 12 more girls for the cabaret, including Andraya, Yummy, Abby, Dani, Spin, TeLovee, Wet Wet and Daisy. They move into a mansion in Long Island with Joseline's choreographer Ricardo. The girls quickly clash with Andraya for allegedly possessing a Voodoo doll, before another fight breaks out between Yummy and Wet Wet. guest stars: Balistic Beats (Joseline's husband)
38	4	"Why Do You Wanna Stay?"	August 13, 2023
The girls perform Ricardo's choreography for Joseline, to determine who will join her upcoming performance at Floyd Mayweather Jr.'s fight in Miami. She picks Natural, Yummy, Andraya and Dani, and asks them to decide who should be eliminated next. Abby reveals to Joseline that she is transgender. Joseline takes a peak at Abby's "designer vagina", which leaves her in tears. The girls eliminate "Blow up Doll", "Big Mama" and "Pretty Baby", and try to get rid of Wet Wet, but Joseline overrides them and gets rid of another dancer ("Crybaby") instead. Abby, TeLovee, Ms. Egypt, Spin, Holiday and Precious are allowed to stay in the house. Lucky returns bearing gifts for Joseline as an apology. Although Joseline is against it, the other girls vote to keep her in the house.
39	5	"Practice Makes Perfect"	August 20, 2023
Lucky asks the girls for advice on how to get back in Joseline's good graces. Precious reveals she dated Holiday over a decade ago. Later, Joseline surprises the girls by showing up at their rehearsal. She still can't forgive Lucky and kicks her out of the room. As the four cabaret girls practice for their upcoming performance, a fight breaks out between Wet Wet and TeLovee. guest stars: Balistic Beats (Joseline's husband)
40	6	"Somebody is Leaking"	August 27, 2023
Wet Wet and Egypt have back-to-back brawls with TeLovee and Daisy.
41	7	"Time to Play"	September 3, 2023
While Joseline takes a few ladies to Miami, the other cabaret girls stay back and have some much needed fun.
42	8	"Fight after the Fight"	September 10, 2023
Chaos breaks out between Joseline and a former Cabaret lady after the Mayweather exhibition fight.
43	9	"Cabaret Kisses"	September 17, 2023
From the hot tub to the bedroom, while Joseline is away the Cabaret girls continue to play.
44	10	"10 Toes Down"	September 24, 2023
Lucky is placed in a compromising position between Joseline and her friend.
45	11	"All Together Now"	October 1, 2023
Every lady gets to participate in an epic NYC performance.
46	12	"You Can Make It Anywhere"	October 8, 2023
After a successful New York Cabaret, Joseline and the ladies celebrate their hard work.
47	13	"Reunion: Part 1"	November 5, 2023
Hosts Jess Hilarious and Janeisha John hold court as The Puerto Rican Princess reunites with her Season 4 cast.
48	14	"Reunion: Part 2"	November 12, 2023
