= List of Love & Hip Hop: Miami episodes =

Love & Hip Hop: Miami is the fourth installment of the Love & Hip Hop reality television franchise. It premiered on January 1, 2018 on VH1 and chronicles the lives of several people in the Miami area who are involved with hip hop music.

== Series overview ==
| Season | Episodes | | Originally released | | |
| Season | Episodes | | First released | Last released | Network |
|---|---|---|---|---|---|
| 1 | 12 | | January 1, 2018 | March 19, 2018 | VH1 |
| 2 | 14 | | January 2, 2019 | March 25, 2019 | VH1 |
| 3 | 14 | | January 6, 2020 | April 6, 2020 | VH1 |
| 4 | 25 | 12 | August 23, 2021 | November 8, 2021 | VH1 |
| 4 | 25 | 13 | August 8, 2022 | October 17, 2022 | VH1 |
| 5 | 25 | 12 | August 14, 2023 | October 30, 2023 | VH1 |
| 5 | 25 | 13 | January 22, 2024 | April 15, 2024 | VH1 |
| 6 | 24 | | November 18, 2024 | April 28, 2025 | VH1 |
| 7 | 24 | 12 | November 5, 2025 | January 28, 2026 | BET |
| 7 | 24 | 12 | April 8, 2026 | June 24, 2026 | BET |

== Episodes ==
=== Season 1 (2018) ===
| No. overall | No. in season | Title | Original release date | US viewers (millions) |
|---|---|---|---|---|
| 1 | 1 | "Welcome To Miami" | January 1, 2018 | 1.83 |
| 2 | 2 | "Forbidden Fruit" | January 8, 2018 | 1.67 |
| 3 | 3 | "Hey Stranger" | January 15, 2018 | 1.57 |
| 4 | 4 | "Fashion Victims" | January 22, 2018 | 1.72 |
| 5 | 5 | "Good Hair" | January 29, 2018 | 1.88 |
| 6 | 6 | "Saints & Sinners" | February 5, 2018 | 1.75 |
| 7 | 7 | "I'm Done" | February 12, 2018 | 1.55 |
| 8 | 8 | "Real Talk" | February 19, 2018 | 1.78 |
| 9 | 9 | "Crossroads" | February 26, 2018 | 1.64 |
| 10 | 10 | "TNT" | March 5, 2018 | 1.68 |
| 11 | 11 | "Reunion – Part 1" | March 12, 2018 | 1.65 |
| 12 | 12 | "Reunion – Part 2" | March 19, 2018 | 1.96 |

=== Season 2 (2019) ===
| No. overall | No. in season | Title | Original release date | US viewers (millions) |
|---|---|---|---|---|
| 13 | 1 | "Take It to the House" | January 2, 2019 | 1.09 |
| 14 | 2 | "Family Matters" | January 9, 2019 | 0.87 |
| 15 | 3 | "Familiar Feuds" | January 16, 2019 | 0.84 |
| 16 | 4 | "Nada, Nada Empanada" | January 23, 2019 | 0.82 |
| 17 | 5 | "Girl Talk" | January 30, 2019 | 0.95 |
| 18 | 6 | "Family Treason" | February 4, 2019 | 1.07 |
| 19 | 7 | "Me Too" | February 11, 2019 | 1.11 |
| 20 | 8 | "To Serve and Protect" | February 18, 2019 | 1.10 |
| 21 | 9 | "Petty Hurts" | February 25, 2019 | 1.04 |
| 22 | 10 | "Performance Anxiety" | March 4, 2019 | 1.00 |
| 23 | 11 | "Rockstarrs and Reflections" | March 11, 2019 | 1.12 |
| 24 | 12 | "Ready, Set, Release" | March 18, 2019 | 1.06 |
| 25 | 13 | "Reunion – Part 1" | March 18, 2019 | 1.12 |
| 26 | 14 | "Reunion – Part 2" | March 25, 2019 | 1.53 |

=== Season 3 (2020) ===
| No. overall | No. in season | Title | Original release date | US viewers (millions) |
|---|---|---|---|---|
| 27 | 1 | "There's No Way" | January 6, 2020 | 1.41 |
| 28 | 2 | "On the Record" | January 13, 2020 | 1.09 |
| 29 | 3 | "Trick or Treat" | January 20, 2020 | 1.06 |
| 30 | 4 | "Blurred Lines" | January 27, 2020 | 1.09 |
| 31 | 5 | "Overstepping Boundaries" | February 3, 2020 | 1.05 |
| 32 | 6 | "Apology Tour" | February 10, 2020 | 1.04 |
| 33 | 7 | "One Call Away" | February 17, 2020 | 1.04 |
| 34 | 8 | "The Ugly Truth" | February 24, 2020 | 0.92 |
| 35 | 9 | "Take A Bow" | March 2, 2020 | 1.05 |
| 36 | 10 | "Homecoming" | March 9, 2020 | 0.97 |
| 37 | 11 | "Pressing Forward" | March 16, 2020 | 1.25 |
| 38 | 12 | "Full Circle" | March 23, 2020 | 1.25 |
| 39 | 13 | "Reunion – Part 1" | March 30, 2020 | 1.38 |
| 40 | 14 | "Reunion – Part 2" | April 6, 2020 | 1.20 |

=== Season 4 (2021–22) ===
| No. overall | No. in season | Title | Original release date | US viewers (millions) |
|---|---|---|---|---|
Part 1
| 41 | 1 | "Miami is the Moment" | August 23, 2021 | 0.61 |
| 42 | 2 | "Island Time" | August 30, 2021 | 0.63 |
| 43 | 3 | "Thicker Than Water" | September 6, 2021 | 0.57 |
| 44 | 4 | "Keep It Nasty" | September 13, 2021 | 0.65 |
| 45 | 5 | "Banned in the M.I.A." | September 20, 2021 | 0.52 |
| 46 | 6 | "Tiger Queen" | September 27, 2021 | 0.51 |
| 47 | 7 | "Wrong Way" | October 4, 2021 | 0.44 |
| 48 | 8 | "The Harder They Fall" | October 11, 2021 | 0.38 |
| 49 | 9 | "Show Up and Show Out" | October 18, 2021 | 0.46 |
| 50 | 10 | "Line In the Sand" | October 25, 2021 | 0.37 |
| 51 | 11 | "Indecent Proposal" | November 1, 2021 | 0.38 |
| 52 | 12 | "Bottoms Up" | November 8, 2021 | 0.41 |
Part 2
| 53 | 13 | "Make Some Noise" | August 8, 2022 | 0.72 |
| 54 | 14 | "Blessings and Curses" | August 15, 2022 | 0.51 |
| 55 | 15 | "Grab the Mic" | August 22, 2022 | 0.51 |
| 56 | 16 | "Stomping Grounds" | August 22, 2022 | 0.45 |
| 57 | 17 | "Throw That Thang" | August 29, 2022 | 0.49 |
| 58 | 18 | "Secret Sauce" | September 5, 2022 | 0.55 |
| 59 | 19 | "A Thin Line Between Love & Haiti" | September 12, 2022 | 0.47 |
| 60 | 20 | "Nothing's Sacred" | September 19, 2022 | 0.57 |
| 61 | 21 | "Return of the Hat" | September 26, 2022 | 0.44 |
| 62 | 22 | "Bad Connection" | October 3, 2022 | 0.47 |
| 63 | 23 | "Deep Cuts" | October 10, 2022 | 0.42 |
| 64 | 24 | "Beyond Repair" | October 17, 2022 | 0.46 |
| 65 | 25 | "Reunion" | October 17, 2022 | 0.37 |

=== Season 5 (2023–24) ===
| No. overall | No. in season | Title | Original release date | US viewers (millions) |
|---|---|---|---|---|
Part 1
| 66 | 1 | "Out With the Gold" | August 14, 2023 | 0.32 |
| 67 | 2 | "Don't Read the Comments" | August 21, 2023 | 0.34 |
| 68 | 3 | "Fight for Your Wife" | August 28, 2023 | 0.31 |
| 69 | 4 | "Caribbean Rhapsody" | September 4, 2023 | 0.26 |
| 70 | 5 | "Red Flags" | September 11, 2023 | 0.30 |
| 71 | 6 | "Mean Girls" | September 18, 2023 | 0.32 |
| 72 | 7 | "Purseholders" | September 25, 2023 | 0.31 |
| 73 | 8 | "Dog Eat Dog" | October 2, 2023 | 0.33 |
| 74 | 9 | "Claws Out" | October 9, 2023 | 0.41 |
| 75 | 10 | "No-Shows and Low Blows" | October 16, 2023 | 0.34 |
| 76 | 11 | "Falling Out" | October 23, 2023 | 0.42 |
| 77 | 12 | "What We're Not Gonna Do" | October 30, 2023 | 0.47 |
Part 2
| 78 | 13 | "Unfinished Business" | January 22, 2024 | 0.32 |
| 79 | 14 | "Watch Yourself" | January 29, 2024 | 0.31 |
| 80 | 15 | "Guess Who's Back" | February 5, 2024 | 0.31 |
| 81 | 16 | "All of the Lytes" | February 12, 2024 | 0.29 |
| 82 | 17 | "Get Out" | February 19, 2024 | 0.23 |
| 83 | 18 | "Keep It on The Low" | February 26, 2024 | 0.30 |
| 84 | 19 | "My Messy Valentine" | March 4, 2024 | 0.36 |
| 85 | 20 | "Safaree Ride" | March 11, 2024 | 0.37 |
| 86 | 21 | "Hopeless Romantics" | March 18, 2024 | 0.34 |
| 87 | 22 | "Island Inferno" | March 25, 2024 | 0.34 |
| 88 | 23 | "A Slap in the Face" | April 1, 2024 | 0.34 |
| 89 | 24 | "Stunt Queen" | April 8, 2024 | 0.39 |
| 90 | 25 | "Nasty Work" | April 15, 2024 | 0.28 |

=== Season 6 (2024–25) ===
| No. overall | No. in season | Title | Original release date | US viewers (millions) |
|---|---|---|---|---|
| 91 | 1 | "Blac & White" | November 18, 2024 | 0.25 |
| 92 | 2 | "Stand on Business" | November 25, 2024 | 0.28 |
| 93 | 3 | "Lovesick" | December 2, 2024 | 0.31 |
| 94 | 4 | "Blinded by the Lies" | December 9, 2024 | 0.26 |
| 95 | 5 | "Breaking Point" | December 16, 2024 | 0.25 |
| 96 | 6 | "Take the Cake" | December 23, 2024 | 0.19 |
| 97 | 7 | "Somebody's Husband" | December 30, 2024 | 0.23 |
| 98 | 8 | "Lashing Out" | January 6, 2025 | 0.25 |
| 99 | 9 | "Sound & Fury" | January 13, 2025 | 0.29 |
| 100 | 10 | "Tea N' Tea" | January 20, 2025 | 0.30 |
| 101 | 11 | "Certified Hater" | January 27, 2025 | 0.29 |
| 102 | 12 | "Curse Control" | February 3, 2025 | 0.24 |
| 103 | 13 | "Screaming, Crying, Thwowing Up" | February 10, 2025 | 0.28 |
| 104 | 14 | "Small Fry" | February 17, 2025 | 0.30 |
| 105 | 15 | "Throw the Book at Him" | February 24, 2025 | 0.27 |
| 106 | 16 | "Acting Up" | March 3, 2025 | 0.25 |
| 107 | 17 | "Want That Old Thing Back" | March 10, 2025 | 0.26 |
| 108 | 18 | "He Loves Me Not" | March 17, 2025 | 0.30 |
| 109 | 19 | "Secret Agenda" | March 24, 2025 | 0.24 |
| 110 | 20 | "Fights & Feelings" | March 31, 2025 | 0.22 |
| 111 | 21 | "Chaos in Curacao" | April 7, 2025 | 0.30 |
| 112 | 22 | "Heaven Is a Place on Earth" | April 14, 2025 | 0.23 |
| 113 | 23 | "Paradise Lost" | April 21, 2025 | 0.24 |
| 114 | 24 | "Uncharted Waters" | April 28, 2025 | 0.30 |

=== Season 7 (2025–26) ===
| No. overall | No. in season | Title | Original release date |
|---|---|---|---|
| 115 | 1 | "The Last Laugh" | November 4, 2025 |
| 116 | 2 | "Sister Circle" | November 11, 2025 |
| 117 | 3 | "Wife on the Line" | November 18, 2025 |
| 118 | 4 | "Mama's Baby, Daddy's Maybe" | November 25, 2025 |
| 119 | 5 | "Scorned" | December 2, 2025 |
| 120 | 6 | "Identity Crisis" | December 9, 2025 |
| 121 | 7 | "Ten Toes Down" | December 16, 2025 |
| 122 | 8 | "Guilt by Association" | December 23, 2025 |
| 123 | 9 | "Bootz on the Ground" | January 7, 2026 |
| 124 | 10 | "On the Outs" | January 14, 2026 |
| 125 | 11 | "Grand Theft Auto" | January 21, 2026 |
| 126 | 12 | "The Tables Turn" | January 28, 2026 |
| 127 | 13 | "Mami Said Knock You Out" | April 8, 2026 |
| 128 | 14 | "Holy Smoke" | April 15, 2026 |
| 129 | 15 | "Diss & Tell" | April 22, 2026 |
| 130 | 16 | "You Got Swurved" | April 29, 2026 |
| 131 | 17 | "Laugh Now Cry Later" | May 6, 2026 |
| 132 | 18 | "Your Time Is Up" | May 13, 2026 |
| 133 | 19 | "You're Ghana Love Me" | May 20, 2026 |
| 134 | 20 | "The Final Cut" | May 27, 2026 |
| 135 | 21 | "Heal or No Heal" | June 3, 2026 |
| 136 | 22 | "Taken for a Ride" | June 10, 2026 |
| 137 | 23 | "Namaste Mad" | June 17, 2026 |
| 138 | 24 | "Mic Drop" | June 24, 2026 |

== Ratings ==
Love & Hip Hop: Miami : U.S. viewers per episode (millions)

| Season | Episode number | | | | | | | | | | | | | | | | | | | | | | | | |
| Season | 1 | 2 | 3 | 4 | 5 | 6 | 7 | 8 | 9 | 10 | 11 | 12 | 13 | 14 | 15 | 16 | 17 | 18 | 19 | 20 | 21 | 22 | 23 | 24 | 25 |
|---|---|---|---|---|---|---|---|---|---|---|---|---|---|---|---|---|---|---|---|---|---|---|---|---|---|
| Season 1 (2018) | 1.83 | 1.67 | 1.57 | 1.72 | 1.88 | 1.75 | 1.55 | 1.78 | 1.64 | 1.68 | 1.65 | 1.96 | – | | | | | | | | | | | | |
| Season 2 (2019) | 1.09 | 0.87 | 0.84 | 0.82 | 0.95 | 1.07 | 1.11 | 1.10 | 1.04 | 1.00 | 1.12 | 1.06 | 1.12 | 1.53 | – | | | | | | | | | | |
| Season 3 (2020) | 1.41 | 1.09 | 1.06 | 1.09 | 1.05 | 1.04 | 1.04 | 0.92 | 1.05 | 0.97 | 1.25 | 1.25 | 1.38 | 1.20 | – | | | | | | | | | | |
| Season 4 (2021–22) | 0.61 | 0.63 | 0.57 | 0.65 | 0.52 | 0.51 | 0.44 | 0.38 | 0.46 | 0.37 | 0.38 | 0.41 | 0.72 | 0.51 | 0.51 | 0.45 | 0.49 | 0.55 | 0.47 | 0.57 | 0.44 | 0.47 | 0.42 | 0.46 | 0.37 |
| Season 5 (2023–24) | 0.32 | 0.34 | 0.31 | 0.26 | 0.30 | 0.32 | 0.31 | 0.33 | 0.41 | 0.34 | 0.42 | 0.47 | 0.32 | 0.31 | 0.31 | 0.29 | 0.23 | 0.30 | 0.36 | 0.37 | 0.34 | 0.34 | 0.34 | 0.39 | 0.28 |
| Season 6 (2024–25) | 0.25 | 0.28 | 0.31 | 0.26 | 0.25 | 0.19 | 0.23 | 0.25 | 0.29 | 0.30 | 0.29 | 0.24 | 0.28 | 0.30 | 0.27 | 0.25 | 0.26 | 0.30 | 0.24 | 0.22 | 0.30 | 0.23 | 0.24 | 0.30 | – |

Audience measurement performed by Nielsen Media Research
