= Jess Hilarious =

American comedian

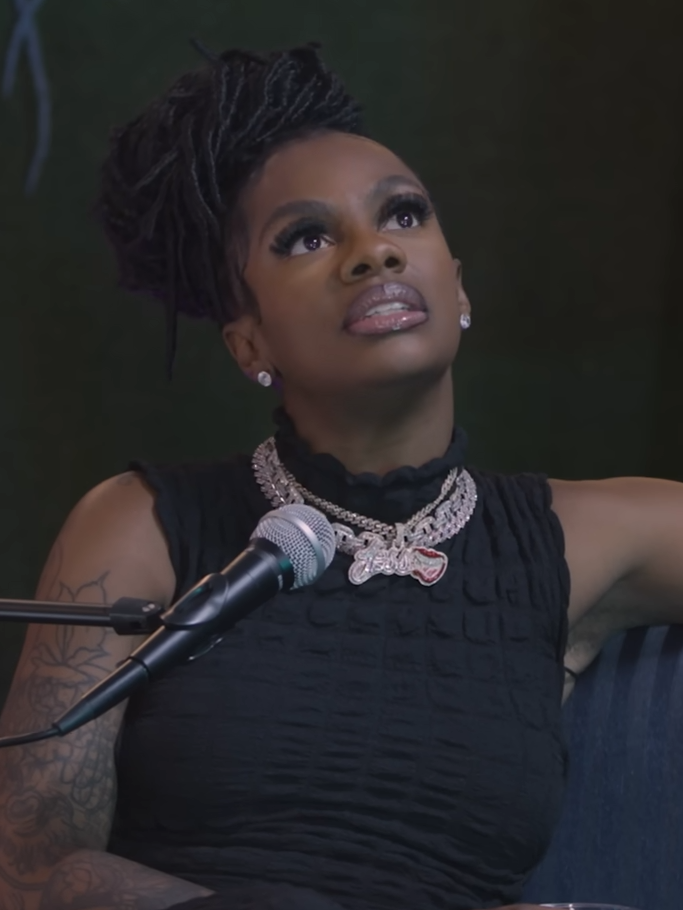
- Hilarious in 2023
- Born: Jessica Robin Moore; February 13, 1992 (age 34); Baltimore, Maryland, U.S.
- Occupations: Comedian; actress; radio personality; social media personality
- Years active: 2017–present
- Children: 2

Jessica Robin Moore (born February 13, 1992), known professionally as Jess Hilarious, is an American comedian, actress, radio personality, and social media personality. Since 2024, she has co-hosted the radio show The Breakfast Club.

Hilarious rose to prominence with her weekly "Jess with the Mess" pop culture news segment on Instagram starting in 2017. On television, she recurred on the MTV series Wild 'n Out (2017–2018) and starred in the short-lived Fox sitcom Rel (2018–2019) as Brittany. From 2020 to 2025, she hosted the podcast Carefully Reckless.

== Early life ==
Jessica Robin Moore was born on February 13, 1992 in Baltimore, Maryland. She has described herself as having "a nice foundation and structured family" as a child. As a teenager, Moore's mother sent her from Baltimore to Pennsylvania due to her marijuana usage and rebellious behavior, where she attended a predominantly white high school.

Prior to working in comedy, she aspired to be a model. She worked various jobs, including at McDonald's, Walmart, and with children, all of which she was fired from, before studying mortuary science at a trade school. She dropped out after being scared by the embalming process and soon decided to pursue a career in comedy instead.

== Career ==
=== Social media and stand-up comedy ===
Hilarious started her comedy career in stand-up. In 2017, she rose to prominence with her weekly Instagram series "Jess with the Mess", in which she recounted prominent pop culture and news items from throughout the previous week. Delores Shante of The St. Louis American reviewed her 2017 stand-up performance in St. Louis negatively, writing, "Jess found out the hard way that poppin' off on celebrities for 60 seconds and engaging an audience ... for a full-length routine, are night and day."

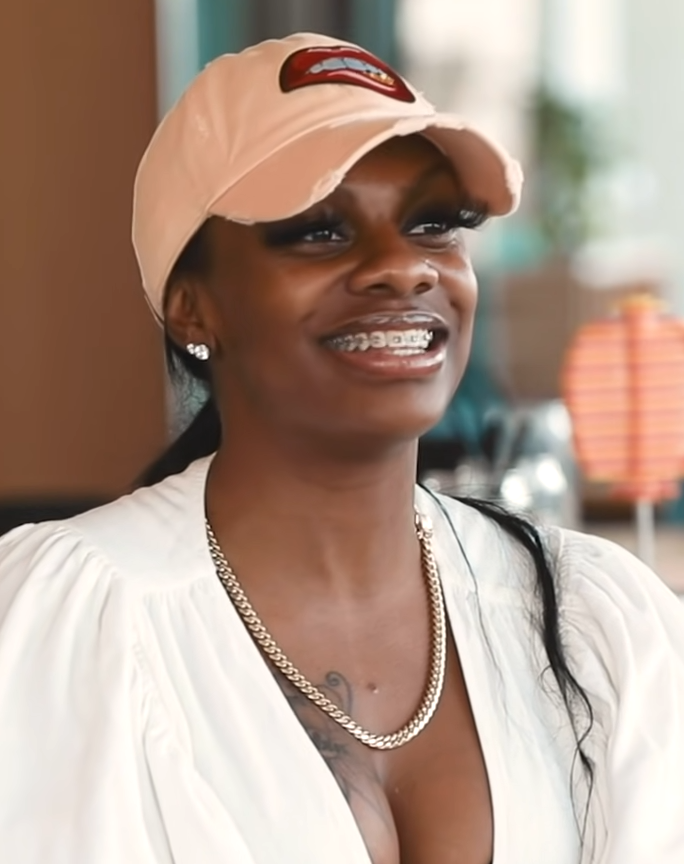
Hilarious in 2019

In 2018, Hilarious had more than four million Instagram followers. In July 2018, her comedic Instagram rant about being confused for a New Yorker and explaining aspects of the Baltimore dialect went viral online, and a Baltimore club remix of the video by DJ BooMan, titled "Jess H Bmore Anthem", was released in September 2018. She co-hosted the BET Social Awards with D.C. Young Fly in March 2019.

=== Television and film ===
After Nick Cannon direct messaged Hilarious, she made her television debut on his MTV series Wild 'n Out in 2017, on which she appeared for three seasons. She made her television acting debut on the Fox sitcom Rel—which premiered in September 2018 and was named after and starred comedian Lil Rel Howery as Rel—playing Brittany, Rel's stubborn best friend. She replaced Angel Laketa Moore, whose role was recast after the pilot's table read in March 2018. Anna Moeslein of Glamour described Hilarious's as a breakout role, writing that she "steals the show", while Decider's Joel Keller praised her in a review of the show as "elevat[ing] every scene she was in" and "grounding the show in some realism". The series was cancelled in April 2019 after its first season.

Hilarious also starred in the 2019 film I Got the Hook-Up 2 as Officer Keisha. She later claimed in 2023 that she had not been properly compensated by Master P for her role in the film. She later starred in the 2023 BET+ biographical film First Lady of BMF: The Tonesa Welch Story, which was Vivica A. Fox's directorial debut and premiered in October of that year, and as Leah in the drama film I Hate I Love You, which was directed by Jabriel McIntosh and released in late 2024.

=== Radio and podcasting ===
Hilarious's podcast Carefully Reckless, in which she discussed topics such as sexuality, politics, and dating, premiered in 2020 as part of the launch lineup of Charlamagne Tha God's Black Effect Podcast Network. It was one of the first podcasts to be released by Facebook as part of their in-platform podcast streaming service in June 2021. The podcast was hosted at the Roots Picnic in 2022 as part of their Podcast Stage. By 2023, the podcast was part of the iHeartPodcasts network and had entered its third season.

Hilarious appeared on the scripted, Kym Whitley–helmed Audible podcast Kym, which premiered in October 2022. She guest co-hosted the radio show The Breakfast Club several times throughout 2023, including during a December interview with Sexyy Red during which the rapper confronted her over her alleged "sneak dissing". She also had a brief feud with Lil Meech and his then–girlfriend Summer Walker after calling Lil Meech "deli smelly" and a "cheater" on the show in June of that year. She announced at a party in Baltimore in December 2023 that she had been hired as a permanent host of the show, replacing Angela Yee, who had left the show in August 2022.

It was officially announced in a video on The Breakfast Club's social media accounts in January 2024 and she began her tenure on the show the following month. She announced later that month that she was pregnant with her second child and went on maternity leave that summer, picking producer Loren LoRosa to fill in for her "Jess with the Mess" segment.

==== Loren LoRosa feud ====
Following Hilarious's return to The Breakfast Club in November 2024, LoRosa stayed on the show and began hosting her own segment, "Latest with Loren". Social media users largely praised LoRosa's role on the show and compared it favorably to Hilarious's, with some saying LoRosa exhibited more professionalism than Hilarious. Partly in response to comments made by comedian Corey Holcomb, who criticized Hilarious as untalented and opined that LoRosa was a better fit for the show,

Hilarious stated in an Instagram Live stream in March 2025 that she had not been made aware of plans to add LoRosa as a fourth co-host, that she was upset that "Latest with Loren" had been pushed into the time slot originally reserved for "Jess with the Mess", that the show was being run "like a high school", and that she did not receive support from her co-hosts in the face of hate comments. LoRosa and Hilarious discussed her comments on-air on The Breakfast Club the next morning, with Hilarious expressing her initial distaste for LoRosa still being on the show after she came back and stating that the energy had been "weird" in the studio since her return, and LoRosa responding that the two had previously had workplace meetings regarding their relationship and that everything "was going to be fine".

Blavity's Arielle Poteau and Essence's Jasmine Browley both described Hilarious's behavior, particularly her telling LoRosa to "shut up" due to her "overtalking", as unprofessional, and her anger toward LoRosa as "misplaced", while social media responses were polarized and compared the discussion to a human resources meeting. Later that month, Hilarious and LoRosa sang and released a parody of the Brandy and Monica song "The Boy is Mine" titled "The Job is Mine", which spoofed their feud over Hilarious's position on the show and was praised by commenters.

== Personal life ==
Hilarious's son was born to her and her then–boyfriend Rome when she was 20 years old. The two later separated and began co-parenting. In 2017, she appeared in a nude photoshoot with her son when he was five years old, which attracted controversy online and discussions over its appropriateness.

She dated fellow comedian Kountry Wayne for several months in 2019, later discovering that he was married during their relationship. She dated Daniel Parsons and appeared with him on the series VH1 Couples Retreat in 2022. She publicly announced her relationship with a truck driver named Chris in June 2023, with whom she had her second child, a daughter, in August 2024.

She lived in Atlanta until 2023.

== Public image ==
Hilarious has described Martin Lawrence and Kevin Hart as comedic inspirations. Rolling Out's Raquelle "Rocki" Harris described her comedy as "bold and raw" in 2018, while Keith Golden Jr. of The Washington Informer called it "high-energy" and "unfiltered" and wrote that she was "known for blending personal stories with sharp social observations" in 2025. In 2017, Blavity included her on their list of the 15 funniest Black women on Instagram.

In February 2019, she ranked at number two on The Hollywood Reporter's Top Comedians chart, which ranked comedians by their engagement and growth on social media. In 2023, CT Jones of Rolling Stone described her as "one of the internet's biggest Black comedians".

In August 2018, Hilarious launched 50 Strands of Jess, a hair care line, at the Bronner Bros. International Beauty Show.

=== Sikh airplane videos ===
In March 2019, Hilarious posted a series of videos in which she described feeling "threatened" and "scared" upon seeing a group of turbaned Sikh men boarding the same flight as her. They were soon deplaned following an evacuation, which she called "ironic". Following backlash against the videos, which social media users widely criticized as xenophobic racial profiling and connected to the Christchurch mosque shootings which had taken place days earlier, she posted an apology on Instagram in which she denied being racist and wrote that she had been "totally unaware of the different types of Muslim" until then.

Her apology also faced criticism for misidentifying Sikhism as a sect of Islam. She posted a follow-up apology video in which she called her prior actions, including her initial apology, "insensitive", "ignorant", and "defensive", and pledged to donate $15 thousand to the families of the victims of the Christchurch shootings.

=== Comments on transgender women ===
In July 2023, Hilarious posted a video on Instagram in response to transgender TikTok user Blessing Rose, who stated in a video that cis women did not "own" womanhood nor menstruation, by referring to cisgender women as "real women" and "the gatekeepers for periods" and likening trans women, whom she called "delusion[al]", to the "mentally insane". The video went viral and received polarized reactions online. Trans entertainer Ts Madison posted a tweet soon after the posts circulated, in which she wrote that anger from "'real' women" often stemmed from their being confused as transgender themselves, which resulted in a back-and-forth on social media between her and Hilarious.

Trans actress Angelica Ross and trans writer Raquel Willis also both responded negatively to Hilarious's posts. DJ Akademiks tweeted in response to the video that he "thought [Hilarious] was trans this whole time". Them and Rolling Stone described Hilarious's video as transphobic. Armstrong Williams wrote for CBS Austin that she "quite rightly" stated the "simple truth that only biological women can menstruate and bear children."

During an interview with influencer Lynae Vanee on The Breakfast Club in May 2025, Hilarious stated that "only women could have babies", to which Vanee responded that anyone with a uterus could have a child and Hilarious agreed. Social media users interpreted her comments as transphobic and she soon posted photos of herself pregnant on Instagram with the caption, "My uterus is my superpower!" According to her, her scheduled appearance on the BET+ series The Ms. Pat Show was cancelled because of the comment.

In October 2025, when Charlamagne Tha God suggested on The Breakfast Club that Ts Madison could appear in a reboot of the stand-up comedy film The Queens of Comedy, she replied, "We already got a Kings of Comedy." Madison responded in a tweet that Hilarious looked "like Robert Townsend in the face" and needed "to take her freak-a-leek Petey Pablo-looking ass to a pillow and rest". Henry Giardina of Queerty described Hilarious's repeated comments about Madison as a transphobic "bullying campaign".

== Filmography ==
=== Film ===
Year	Title	Role	Notes
2019	I Got the Hook-Up 2	Officer Keisha Smith	
2020	2 Minutes of Fame	Zena	
2021	Hip Hop Family Christmas	T the Rapper	TV movie
2023	Pretty Stoned	Herself	TV movie
2023	First Lady of BMF: The Tonesa Welch Story	Lisa	Video
2024	The Realtor	Deanna	
2024	I Hate I Love You	Leah Branson	
2025	Flood	Detective Camp	

=== Television ===
Year	Title	Role	Notes
2017	All Def Comedy	Herself	Episode: "Episode #1.5"
2017	Face Value	Herself	Episode: "Jess Hilarious vs. Adrianne Moore"
2017–23	Wild 'n Out	Herself	Main Cast: Season 9-10 & 15-20
2018	Black Card Revoked	Herself	Episode: "DC Young Fly, Billy Sorrells, Jess Hilarious"
2018	Hip Hop Squares	Herself/Panelist	Episode: "Ceaser vs Ryan Henry"
2018–19	Rel	Brittany	Main Cast
2019	Dish Nation	Herself/Guest Co-Host	Recurring Guest Co-Host: Season 7
2019	The Real	Herself/Guest Co-Host	Recurring Guest Co-Host: Season 6
2019	Love & Hip Hop: Hollywood	Herself	Episode: "With Friends Like These"
2021	Love & Hip Hop: Atlanta	Herself	Episode: "Love & Hip Hop Atlanta: Inside the A"
2022	I Got a Story to Tell	Divine	Episode: "If You Only Knew"
2023	Joseline's Cabaret: New York	Herself/Host	Episode: "Joseline's Cabaret New York Reunion: Part 1"
2025	Lil Kev	Loretta (voice)	Episode: "Driving Miss Nancy Crazy"
2026	Hacks	Herself	Episode: "The Garden"
