= Luenell =

American comedian and actress

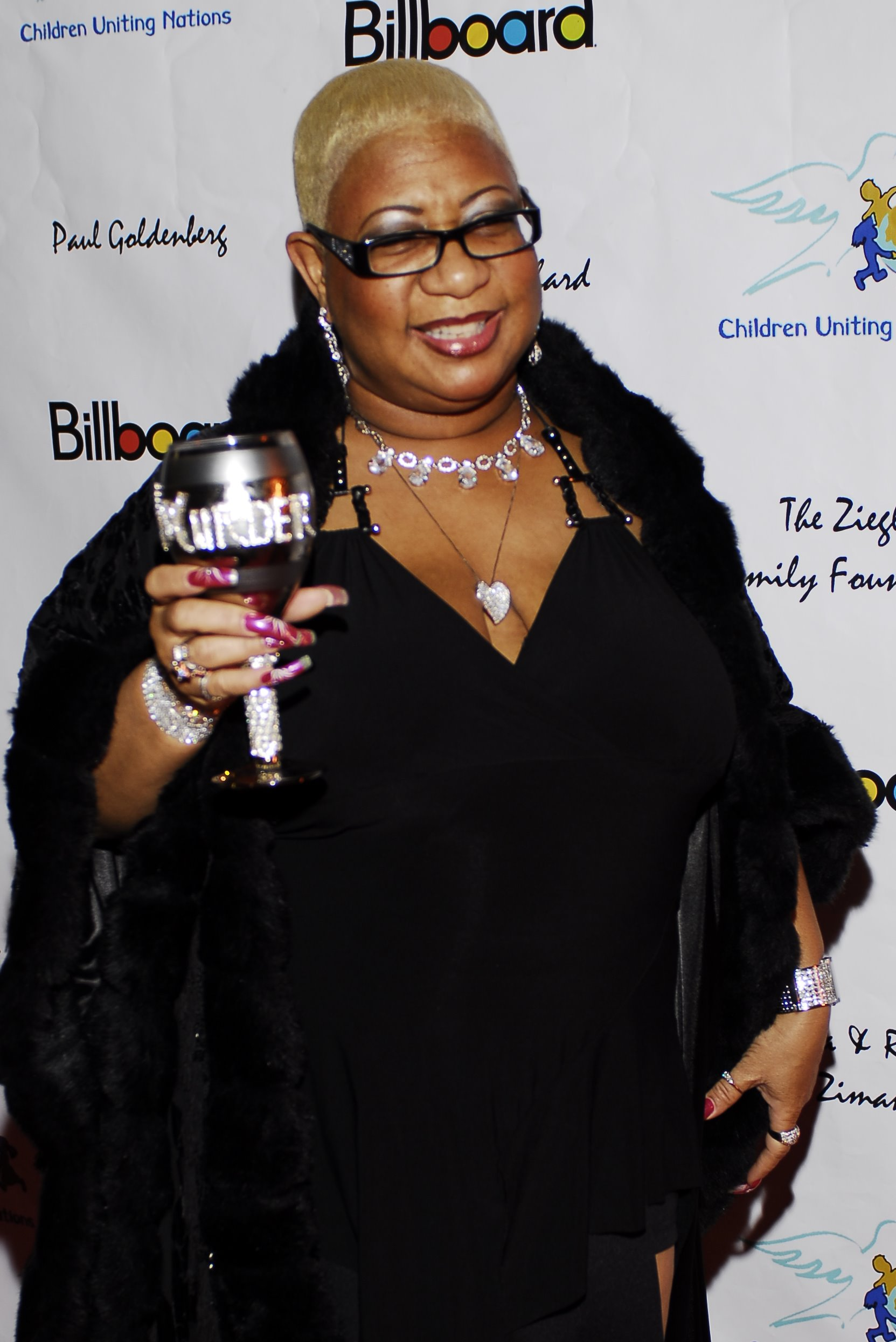
- Luenell at the 79th Annual Academy Awards Children Uniting Nations/Billboard afterparty in February 2007
- Born: Luenell Campbell; March 12, 1959 (age 67); Tollette, Arkansas, U.S.
- Occupations: Comedian, actress
- Years active: 1993–present
- Children: 1

Luenell Campbell (born March 12, 1959), known mononymously as Luenell, is an American comedian and actress. She is best known for her appearance in the mockumentary comedy film Borat (2006).

Her other film roles include Think Like a Man (2012), Taken 2 (2012), Think Like a Man Too (2015), A Star Is Born (2018), Dolemite Is My Name (2019), and Coming 2 America (2021).

Luenell also voiced a Shrunken Head in Hotel Transylvania (2012) and its 2015 sequel.

She has had recurring television roles as Rhonda in Showtime comedy-drama series Californication (2009–2014) and as Miss Loretta on HBO Max dark comedy series Hacks (2021–2025).

== Career ==
In the early 1990s, Luenell appeared regularly on Soul Beat TV on the Oakland, California cable station KSBT, along with prominent Bay Area African-American journalist Chauncey Bailey, an interviewer and talk show host on the program. Luenell was one of the hired actors in the 2006 hit mockumentary comedy film Borat, playing the role of a prostitute.

== Personal life ==
Luenell lived in Castro Valley, California, through most of her teen years. On June 18, 2001, Luenell married her husband Ronald Duane Christian, whom she refers to as Mr. Rarely. She also has a daughter, Da'Nelle.

Although Luenell and Mr. Rarely eventually divorced, they remained close. She revealed that he had undergone treatment for prostate cancer and was living with COPD. On June 23, 2024, Luenell announced on Instagram that he had died following a prolonged illness: “No more breathing machines, no more needles, no more suffering… Even though we were no longer legally married, we remained in each other’s hearts until the very end.”

== Filmography ==
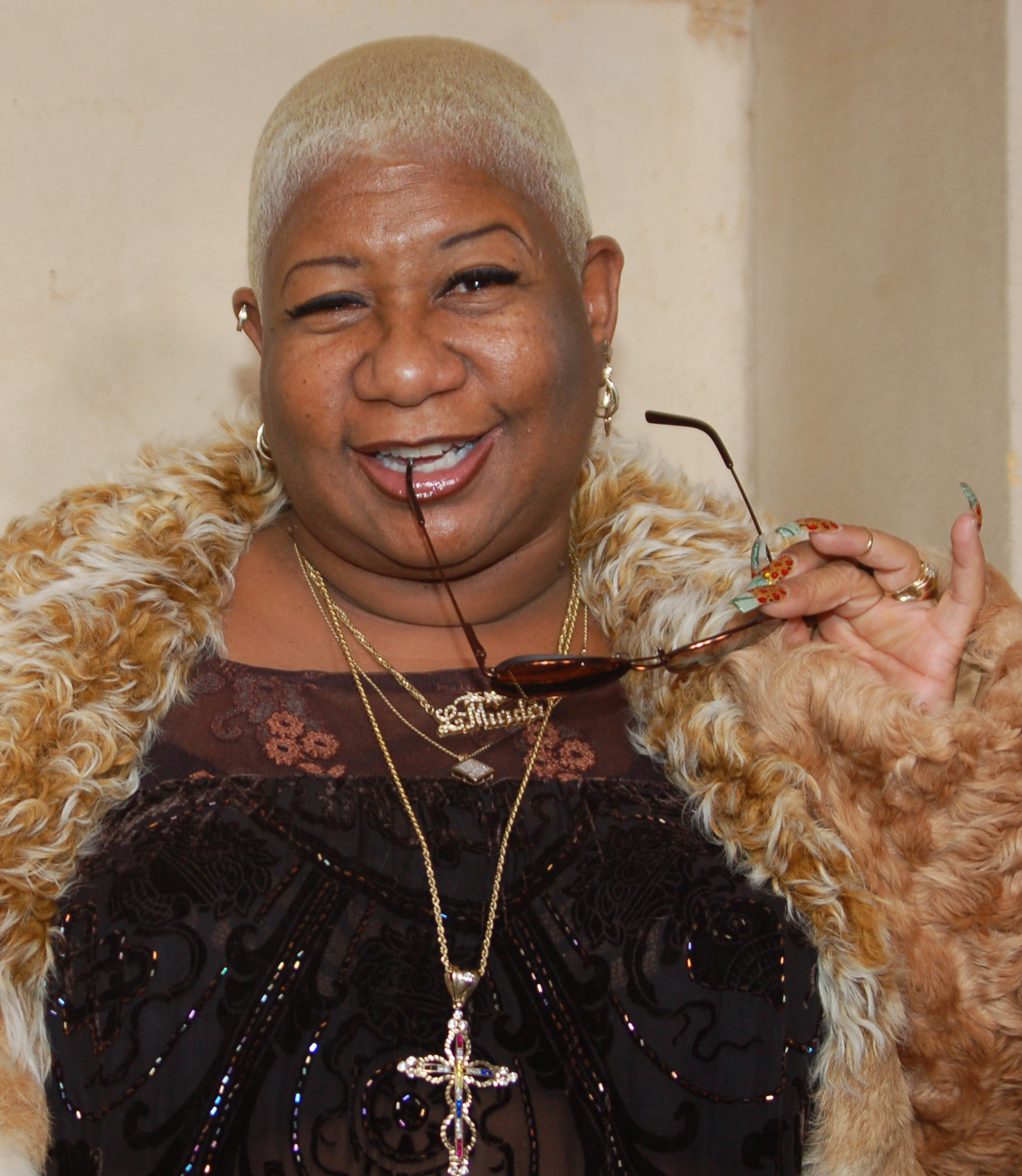
Luenell in December 2010

=== Film ===
Year	Title	Role	Notes
1993	So I Married an Axe Murderer	Police Records Officer	
1996	The Rock	Female Tourist	
2004	Never Die Alone	Jasper	
2005	So Fresh, So Clean... a Down and Dirty Comedy	Mrs. Keyes	
2006	Borat	Luenell	
2007	Katt Williams: American Hustle	Herself	Video
2007	Divine Intervention	Sister Jones	
2008	The Hustle	Metermaid	
2009	Spring Breakdown	Hooker	
2009	All About Steve	Protester Lydia	
2011	Kiss and Tell: The History of Black Romance in Movie	Herself	Video
2011	35 and Ticking	Donya	
2011	Budz House	Mary Jane Howard	
2012	Think Like a Man	Aunt Winnie	
2012	That's My Boy	Champale	
2012	C'mon Man	Joyce	
2012	Mac & Devin Go to High School	Principal Cummings	
2012	Taken 2	Driving Instructor	
2012	Hotel Transylvania	Shrunken Heads (voice)	
2013	In Transition	Marla Stevens	Video
2013	Dealin' with Idiots	Big Time Sara	
2013	A Christmas Blessing	Sheila	TV movie
2014	Think Like a Man Too	Aunt Winnie	
2014	School Dance	Mamma Tawanna	
2014	Matthew 18	Aunt Jessie	
2015	Where Have All the Fathers Gone	Herself	Documentary
2015	Hotel Transylvania 2	Shrunken Heads (voice)	
2015	The HOA	Chanel	TV movie
2016	Definitely Divorcing	Eunice	
2016	LAPD African Cops	Mylanta	
2016	What Are the Chances?	Miss King	
2016	The Clean	Dr. Anastasia Sparks	
2017	Sremm Break	Doña Escopeda	Short
2017	Broken Dreams Blvd	Shelley	TV movie
2018	Don't Get Caught	Mrs. King	Video
2018	A Star Is Born	Cashier	
2019	Funny Women of a Certain Age	Herself	TV movie
2019	I Got the Hook Up 2	Ms. Pam Dickerson	
2019	Dolemite Is My Name	Rudy’s Aunt	
2020	Ballbuster	Cari	
2020	She Ball	Mrs. Mack	
2021	Coming 2 America	Aunt Livia	
2021	Miracles Across 125th Street	-	TV movie
2022	The American King-As told by an African Priestess	Herself	
2022	Block Party	Debra	
2022	God Save the Queens	God	
2025	Dog Man	Milly (voice)	
TBA	All-Star Weekend †	Monique	Completed

=== Television ===
Year	Title	Role	Notes
1993	Hip Hop Slam TV	Herself/host	Episode: "9 & 16 Oct 1993"
1996	Nash Bridges	Street Car Reporter	Episode: "Vanishing Act"
2004	The Tracy Morgan Show	Woman In Hat	Episode: "Church"
2005	ComicView	Herself	Episode: "Episode #14.2"
2006	Laffapalooza	Herself	Episode: "Laffapalooza Volume 7"
2007	Comics Unleashed	Herself	Episode: "23 February 2007"
2007	Comedy Central Roast	Herself	Episode: ″Comedy Central Roast of Flavor Flav″
2008	I Love the New Millennium	Herself	Recurring Guest
2008	Reality Bites Back	Herself	Episode: "Shock of Love"
2008	1st Amendment Stand Up	Herself	Episode: "Angelo Lozada/Luenell/Rod Man/Will-E Robo"
2008	Reality Bites Back	Herself	Episode: ″Episode 2″
2008	Head Case	Twinkle Finkelstein	Episode: "Come Together"
2008	Chocolate News	Candleabra's Mother/Monica Jefferson	Episode: "Episode #1.5" & "#1.9"
2009	Black to the Future	Herself	Episode: "Hour 4: The 00s"
2009–2014	Californication	Rhonda	Recurring cast: season 3, guest: season 7
2010	Undateable	Herself	Episode: "Hour 1-5"
2010	The Boondocks	Nellie Ruckus (voice)	Episode: "The Color Ruckus"
2010–2011	Latino 101	Herself	Main Guest
2011	Way Black When: Primetime	Herself	Episode: "Episode #1.4"
2011	Laugh Out Loud Comedy Festival	Herself	Episode: "Luenell 'Hey Luenell'"
2011	Funny or Die Presents	Herself	Episode: "Episode #2.6"
2011	In the Flow with Affion Crockett	Herself	Episode: "Glee Auditions"
2011	Breaking In	Lunch Truck Lady	Episode: "Tis Better to Have Loved and Flossed"
2011	It's Always Sunny in Philadelphia	Catfish	Episode: "The ANTI-Social Network"
2011	The Middle	Security Woman	Episode: "Hecks on a Plane"
2012	Dishing Tea with Big Meach	Herself	Episode: "From Tollette, AK to Hotel Transylvania, SHE Is Going Places"
2012	StandUp in Stilettos	Herself	Episode: "StandUp in Stilettos, Best of - Melissa Villasenor, Luenell and Nadine Rajabi"
2012	DTLA	Racine	Episode: "Episode #1.5"
2013	Who Gets the Last Laugh?	Herself	Episode: "Finesse Mitchell/Luenell Campbell/Alan Thicke"
2013-16	Apollo Night LA	Herself/Celebrity Host	TV series
2014	Camille Solari's Glaminlalaland	Herself	Episode: "One Year Anniversary at The Comedy Store Hosted by Camille Solari & Adam Barnhardt with Tom Rhodes"
2014	Comedy Underground with Dave Attell	Herself	Episode: "Episode #1.6"
2014	Black Dynamite	Moms Mabley (voice)	Episode: "‘Sweet Bill's Badass Singalong Song’ or ‘Bill Cosby Ain't Himself’"
2015	The Real Housewives of Atlanta	Herself	Episode: "Fix It Therapy"
2015	Real Husbands of Hollywood	Herself	Episode: "When Kevin Met Salli"
2015	Raising Whitley	Herself	Episode: "Beauty Shop Returns"
2015	Lucas Bros. Moving Co.	DMV Lady (voice)	Episode: "Lucas Burgers" & "Escape from Momma"
2015	Breaking In	Lunch Truck Lady	Episode: "Tis Better to Have Loved and Flossed"
2015	Axe Cop	Waitress	Episode: "Axe Cop Saves God"
2015	Black Jesus	Laverne	Episode: "Tasty Tudi's"
2016	Botched	Herself	Episode: "Pinched Perfect"
2016	Shahs of Sunset	Herself	Episode: "Six Persians Walk Into a Bar"
2016	Unsung Hollywood	Herself	Episode: "Rudy Ray Moore" & "Guy and Joe Torry"
2016	Bunnicula	Ted's Wife	Episode: "Alligator Tears"
2017	Unsung	Herself	Episode: "Lenny Williams"
2017	Lopez	Miss Wendy	Recurring cast
2018	Black Card Revoked	Herself	Episode: "K. Michelle, Andra Fuller, Luenell"
2018	Braxton Family Values	Herself	Recurring cast: season 6
2018	Comedians and Cocktails	Herself	Episode: "Grown People Talk"
2018	Abelism	Neighbor	Episode: "Roomful of Assholes"
2019	Black Jesus	Laverne	Episode: "Hair Tudi"
2020	Iyanla: Fix My Life	Herself	Episode: "The Masks We Wear"
2020	The Last O.G.	Aunt Elaine	Episode: "Family Feud"
2020	Game On: A Comedy Crossover Event	Peaches	Episode: "Family Reunion: Remember the Family's Feud?"
2020	Power Book II: Ghost	Ms. Richards	Episode: "Family First"
2021	Dark Humor	Herself	Recurring Guest
2021	Joseline's Cabaret	Herself/co-host	Episode: "Joseline's Cabaret Atlanta: The Reunion Part 1 & 2"
2021	Let's Talk Hair	Herself	Episode: "The Big Chop"
2021	Dad Stop Embarrassing Me!	Sheila	Episode: "BlackPeopleDontGoToTherapy"
2021	Ten Year Old Tom	Lunch Lady (voice)	Recurring cast
2021–2025	Hacks	Miss Loretta	Recurring cast
2022	Phat Tuesdays: The Era Of Hip Hop Comedy	Herself	Main Guest
2022	Celebrity Wheel of Fortune	Herself/Celebrity Contestant	Episode: "Paul Scheer, Luenell and Mary Lynn Rajskub"
2023	Jimmy Kimmel Live!	Herself/Guest	Episode: October 4
2024	John Mulaney Presents: Everybody's in LA	Herself	Episode: "Earthquakes"
