= Carlos Reginald King =

CEO of a television production company

Carlos Reginald King (born October 2, 1979) is the CEO of television production company Kingdom Reign Entertainment which produces shows such as Belle Collective (2020), and Love & Marriage: Huntsville (2019) seen on the Oprah Winfrey Network (OWN), Hollywood Divas and The Next:15, seen on TV One, Selling It: In the ATL, on WeTV, and My Super Sweet 16 featuring rapper Lil Wayne and his daughter Reginae on MTV.

Additionally, Carlos has executive produced four seasons of Bravo's hit show The Real Housewives of Atlanta (Seasons 6, 7, 8 and 9), as well as franchise spinoffs Don't Be Tardy for the Wedding, The Real Housewives of Atlanta: Kandi's Wedding, and I Dream of NeNe: The Wedding, all seen on Bravo. Additional work on the Bravo network include his contributions as a producer on seasons 1 and 2 of The Real Housewives of New Jersey. King has also co-executive produced Love & Hip Hop: Atlanta on VH1, and worked as a producer on Season 25: Oprah Behind the Scenes for the OWN network.

King's work has transitioned from behind-the-scenes to in front of the camera with many television appearances, including hosting the reunion shows for Hollywood Divas and The Next :15. Additional appearances have been made on HLN, VH1, TV One, and others. More recently, he signed a first look deal with OWN: Oprah Winfrey Network.

== Education ==
Before his sophomore year at Wayne State University ended, the Detroit native decided to transfer to Hunter College to pursue a bachelor's degree in mass communications.
