= Season 25: Oprah Behind the Scenes =

- Genre: Documentary
- Starring: Oprah Winfrey
- Country of origin: United States
- No. of seasons: 1
- No. of episodes: 31

Production
- Executive producers: Christina Norman; Oprah Winfrey
- Running time: 45 minutes (excluding commercials)
- Production companies: Harpo Productions; True Entertainment

Original release
- Network: Oprah Winfrey Network
- Release: January 1 – August 14, 2011

Season 25: Oprah Behind The Scenes is an American documentary television series. The series began airing on OWN on January 1, 2011 and concluded on August 7, 2011. Each episode follows production for one or two episodes of the final season of The Oprah Winfrey Show, featuring interview segments with Oprah Winfrey and the production staff. Three special edition episodes produced in house at Harpo were filmed on the Oprah set, featuring Oprah and her producers discussing highlights of the season's episodes with select viewers via Skype.

== Episodes ==
No.	Title	Original release date
1	"Premiere Pressure"	January 1, 2011
Guest appearances: Gayle King, John Travolta and Don Johnson
2	"Back to West Virginia"	January 1, 2011
Guest appearances: Wynonna Judd and Naomi Judd
3	"Liza's Razzle Dazzle"	January 7, 2011
Guest appearance: Liza Minnelli
4	"Camping Craziness"	January 14, 2011
Guest appearances: Jon Stewart, Stephen Colbert, Gayle King
5	"The Guest Who Wasn't There"	January 21, 2011
Guest appearance: Gayle King
6	"Jacksons, Jacksons and More Jacksons"	January 28, 2011
7	"Cold Feet"	February 4, 2011
Guest appearance: Mark Fuhrman
8	"Of Favorite Things and Fog Machines"	February 11, 2011
Guest appearance: The Black Eyed Peas
9	"President Bush"	February 18, 2011
Guest appearances: President George W. Bush, President George H. W. Bush, Barbara Bush
10	"Reconciliation"	February 25, 2011
Guest appearances: Sally Jessy Raphael, Ricki Lake, Phil Donahue, Montel Williams, Geraldo Rivera; Whoopi Goldberg, Quincy Jones and Danny Glover
11	"Oprah's Dinner Date"	March 4, 2011
Guest appearances: Jackie Jackson, Peter Frampton, Shaun Cassidy, The Backstreet Boys; Suze Orman and Nadya Suleman
12	"G'Day Oprah"	March 27, 2011
Guest appearances: Gayle King, Curtis Stone, Australian Prime Minister Julia Gillard
13	"Hugh's High Anxiety"	April 3, 2011
Guest appearances: Gayle King, Russell Crowe, Bono, Hugh Jackman
14	"Oprah's Birthday"	April 10, 2011
Guest appearances: Adam Sandler and Jennifer Aniston; Goldie Hawn
15	"First Lady Michelle Obama"	April 17, 2011
Guest appearances: Michelle Obama; Kathy Freston, Lisa Ling
16	"Fashionably Late"	April 24, 2011
Guest appearances: Jennifer Hudson and Susan Lucci
17	"Reunions"	May 1, 2011
Guest appearances: Iyanla Vanzant; Diana Ross and Billy Dee Williams
18	"Season 25: Oprah Behind the Scenes: Special Edition #1"	May 8, 2011
Guest appearance: Rosie O'Donnell videoed a question to Oprah and the producers about the Jennifer Hudson and Iyanla Vanzant shows.
19	"The View From Here"	May 15, 2011
Guest appearances: Barbara Walters, Whoopi Goldberg, Joy Behar, Elisabeth Hasselbeck, Sherri Shepherd; and Rosie O’Donnell
20	"Oscar Night Sick Day"	May 22, 2011
21	"Rock Star Surprise"	May 29, 2011
Guest appearances: Willow Smith, Melania Trump, Lenny Kravitz, Ivanka Trump, Eric Trump, Donald Trump Jr. and Donald Trump
22	"Saturday Night Live Takes Over The Oprah Show"	June 5, 2011
Guest appearances: Tina Fey, Molly Shannon, Julia Sweeney, Gayle King, Garrett Morris, Dana Carvey, Chevy Chase and Ana Gasteyer
23	"Oprah's Outtakes"	June 12, 2011
Guest appearances: Cee Lo Green, Kirstie Alley, Tom Bergeron; Stevie Nicks, Sheryl Crow, Pat Benatar, Avril Lavigne, Joan Jett, Miley Cyrus and Salt 'n' Pepa
24	"Hello Mr. President"	June 19, 2011
Guest appearances: James Frey; President Barack Obama and Michelle Obama
25	"The Duchess Dilemma"	June 26, 2011
Guest appearances: Sarah, Duchess of York; Michael Kors, Diane von Fürstenberg, Tory Burch
26	"Tom Hanks and Julia Roberts Visit Oprah"	July 10, 2011
Guest appearances: Tom Hanks, Julia Roberts; Ken Ehrlich
27	"The Surprise of Oprah's Life"	July 17, 2011
28	"Season 25: Oprah Behind the Scenes: Special Edition #2"	July 24, 2011
29	"The Beginning of the End"	July 31, 2011
30	"Farewell"	August 7, 2011
Guest appearances: Gayle King, Kirby Bumpus (Gayle's daughter)
31	"Season 25: Oprah Behind the Scenes: Special Edition #3"	August 14, 2011
