= Love & Hip Hop: Miami =

American reality television series

- Genre: Reality television
- Created by: Mona Scott-Young
- Starring: Trina; Prince; Amara La Negra; Gunplay; Veronica Vega; Bobby Lytes; Shay Johnson; Trick Daddy; Jojo Zarur; PreMadonna; Hood Brat; Sukihana; Brisco; Joseline Hernandez; Florence El Luche; Ace Hood; Shelah Marie; N.O.R.E.; Neri Santiago; Ray J; Princess Love; Safaree Samuels; Blac Chyna; Derrick Milano; Zoey Brinxxx; Michael Blackson; Rada Darling; Nadia Beddini
- Country of origin: United States
- Original language: English
- No. of seasons: 7
- No. of episodes: 126 (list of episodes)

Production
- Executive producers: Mona Scott-Young; Stephanie R. Gayle; James Knox; Lashan Browning; Donna Edge-Rachell; Paris Bauldwin; Daniel Wiener; Brian Schornak; Eric Cyphers; Markus Burns; Sitarah Pendelton; Phakiso Collins; Shay Johnson (season 7); Amara La Negra (season 7); Eliza Reign (season 7); Safaree Samuels (season 7); Katrina Laverne Kearse (season 7); Benjamin Kearse Jr. (season 7); Maurice Samuel Young (season 7); Kenisha Renee Myree (season 7); Joy Young (season 7); Gaelle Jacques (season 7)
- Running time: 42–44 minutes
- Production companies: Monami Productions; Eastern TV; Big Fish Entertainment; New Group Productions; VH1; BET

Original release
- Network: VH1
- Release: January 1, 2018 – April 28, 2025
- Network: BET
- Release: November 5, 2025 – June 24, 2026

Related
- Love & Hip Hop: New York; Love & Hip Hop: Atlanta; Love & Hip Hop: Hollywood

Love & Hip Hop: Miami is an American reality television series that premiered on VH1 on January 1, 2018. It chronicles the lives of several people in the Miami area involved with hip hop music. The show features appearances from notable figures associated with Southern hip hop, as well as Latin music and reggaeton. It is the fourth installment of the Love & Hip Hop franchise.

The series' seventh season premiered on BET on November 4, 2025.

== Series synopsis ==
=== Overview and casting ===
==== Seasons 1–3 ====
The cast of the first season, from left to right: Veronica, Bobby, Gunplay, Trick Daddy, Trina, Amara, Shay and Prince.

Love & Hip Hop: Miami revolves around the personal and professional struggles of several rappers, singers and socialites in Miami's music scene. The series is notable for its diverse cast, which reflects Miami's racially and economically diverse community. It has a sprawling supporting cast, who (in most cases) share the same amount of screen time and storyline focus as the show's leads. The premiere episode deals with colorism and eurocentrism within the Latin community, including a scene where light-skinned producer Young Hollywood criticises dark-skinned singer Amara La Negra's afro.

The original cast consisted of Trina, Trick Daddy, Gunplay, Afro-Latina singer Amara La Negra, Cuban-Venezuelan rapper Veronica Vega, openly gay rapper Bobby Lytes, socialite and party promoter Prince, and Flavor of Love's Shay Johnson. The first season's supporting cast would include Steph Lecor, Latin trap producer Young Hollywood, Keyara Stone, urban model and girlfriend of Gunplay, Grammy Award-nominated singer Pleasure P and his Pretty Ricky bandmate Baby Blue Whoaaaa, stripper-turned rapper Miami Tip, Joy Young, estranged wife of Trick Daddy, celebrity stylist Jojo Zarur, Jeffrey White, JT Money's openly gay son and boyfriend of Bobby Lytes, stylist Malik Williams, DJ Michelle Pooch, Prince's girlfriend Liz Cifuentes, model Gabby Davis, and mother-and-daughter brand ambassadors Chinese Kitty and Chinese Nicky. Although not mentioned in the initial cast announcement, Amara's mother Mami Ana and Jojo's mother Faride Nemer would appear in minor supporting roles. Love & Hip Hop: New York's Juju C. and Love & Hip Hop: Atlanta's Lil Scrappy would make special crossover appearances.

On November 19, 2018, VH1 confirmed that nearly all of the show's cast would return for a second season, with Jojo promoted to the main cast. New supporting cast members would include Haitian-Canadian comedienne Jessie Woo, rapper Khaotic and Spectacular of Pretty Ricky. Khaotic made headlines during filming, after he was allegedly involved in a hit-and-run incident.

On November 15, 2019, Jojo Zarur announced that the show would return on January 6, 2020. On December 9, 2019, VH1 confirmed the season's premiere date, along with a promo featuring new cast members Sukihana, Brisco, Hood Brat and waist trainer entrepreneur PreMadonna, who had previously been attached to the show when it first started filming in 2016. Jojo would return in a supporting role, while Veronica Vega left the series entirely. Prince, Gunplay and Baby Blue Whoaaaa, Pleasure P and Spectacular of Pretty Ricky filmed scenes for the season and were included as cast members in the season's press release, however were cut from the season when it eventually aired. On December 11, 2019, VH1 announced the return of Love & Hip Hop: Atlanta's Joseline Hernandez to the franchise, who would join the cast alongside Shay Johnson's brother EmJay Johnson and model Nikki Natural, while rapper KaMillion and social media personality Saucy Santana, best known for his friendship with Yung Miami of City Girls, would appear as recurring guest stars. Despite being credited as a main cast member for the entire season and heavily featured in its promotional material, Joseline disappeared from the show entirely after four episodes, after a series of interviews in which she criticised producer Mona Scott-Young.

==== Seasons 4–present ====
After over a year long hiatus due to the COVID-19 pandemic, the show was retooled for season four, with only Trina, Amara, Trick and Sukihana returning to the main cast. New cast members include Ace Hood and his wife Shelah Marie, Noreaga and his wife Neri, and Florence El Luche. Bobby Lytes was demoted to supporting cast, along with Florence's sister Gaelle and husband Marlon, Suki's fiancé Kill Bill and cousin Isaiah, Trina's boyfriend Raymond Taylor and manager C.O. Love & Hip Hop: Hollywood's Ray J and Princess Love make crossover appearances. The season continued a year later without Ace and Shelah, and with the return of Shay Johnson in a supporting role.

On July 11, 2023, VH1 announced that the show would return for a fifth season on August 14, 2023. It will be preceded by three clip show specials, Love & Hip Hop Miami: Top 10 Most Outrageous Moments on July 24, 2023, Love & Hip Hop Miami: Top 10 Most Legendary Moments on July 31, 2023 and Love & Hip Hop Miami: The Rewind on August 7, 2023, featuring cast members recapping moments of the show.

Season five saw the promotion of Ray J and Princess to the main cast, as well as Safaree Samuels, making the latter the first ever cast member to appear in all four incarnations (Hollywood, New York, and Atlanta) of the franchise, replacing Noreaga and his wife Neri who did not return. New cast members include rapper Zoey Brinxx, manager Supa Cindy, businesswoman Eliza Reign, and Shay Johnson's boyfriend, rapper Fabo, aspiring rap stars the Hollywood Twins Aisha and Daisha, Shay's mother, Sandra Johnson appears in a supporting roles as well as Miami Tip who also appears in a supporting role after a two-year absence. Original cast member Gunplay also appears in a supporting role after a three-year absence with his wife Vonshae. Love & Hip Hop: Atlanta's Momma Dee makes crossover appearances during the season.

The second half of season five resumed on January 22, 2024, with mostly the cast returning, with the exception of Sukihana. Love & Hip Hop: Hollywood alumni Brooke Valentine, husband Marcus Black and Love & Hip Hop: Atlanta's Estelita Quintero appear in supporting roles.

== Cast timeline ==
Main cast (appears in opening credits)
Secondary cast (appears in green screen confessional segments and in end credits alongside the main cast)
Guest cast (appears in a guest role or cameo)

Main cast members
Cast member	Seasons								
Cast member	1	2	3	4A	4B	5A	5B	6A	6B
Trina	Starring								
Trick Daddy	Starring								
Amara La Negra	Starring								
Shay Johnson	Starring			Guest (Note: Appears in the Love & Hip Hop Miami: Inside the 305 special only.)	Supporting			Starring	
Bobby Lytes	Starring			Supporting					
Gunplay	Starring			Guest		Supporting			
Prince	Starring								
Veronica Vega	Starring								
Jojo Zarur	Supporting	Starring	Supporting						
Sukihana			Starring						
PreMadonna			Starring						
Hood Brat			Starring						
Brisco			Starring						
Joseline Hernandez			Starring						
Florence El Luche				Starring					
Noreaga		Guest		Starring					
Neri Santiago				Starring					
Ace Hood	Guest			Starring					
Shelah Marie				Starring					
Ray J		Guest		Supporting		Starring		Supporting	
Princess Love				Supporting		Starring		Supporting	
Safaree Samuels						Starring			
Zoey Brinxx						Supporting		Starring	
Blac Chyna									Starring
Derrick Milano									Starring
Supporting cast members
Cast member	Seasons								
Cast member	1	2	3	4A	4B	5A	5B	6A	6B
Young Hollywood	Supporting								
Mami Ana	Supporting	Guest							
Keyara Stone	Supporting								
Pleasure P	Supporting								
Miami Tip	Supporting					Supporting			
Joy Young	Supporting								
Gabby Davis	Supporting								
Jeffrey White	Supporting								
Michelle Pooch	Supporting								
Malik Williams	Supporting								
Liz Cifuentes	Supporting								
Steph Lecor	Supporting								
Juju C.	Supporting								
Lil Scrappy	Supporting			Guest					
Chinese Nicky	Supporting	Guest							
Chinese Kitty	Supporting								
Faride Nemer	Supporting	Guest							
Baby Blue Whoaaaa	Supporting								
Jessie Woo		Supporting							
Spectacular	Guest	Supporting							
Khaotic		Supporting	Guest						
Nikki Natural			Supporting						
Emjay Johnson			Supporting		Supporting				
Gaelle Jacques				Supporting					
Kill Bill				Supporting					
Raymond Taylor	Guest			Supporting			Guest		
C.O. Piscapo			Guest	Supporting	Guest				
Marlon Dure				Supporting					
Isaiah Henderson				Supporting					
One Snoop Monzta				Guest	Supporting				
Momma Dee					Supporting				
Jay Kelly					Supporting				
Jullian Boothe		Guest			Supporting				
Sandra Sims					Supporting				
Vonshae						Supporting			
Fabo						Supporting	Guest		
Supa Cindy						Supporting			
Aisha Hollywood						Supporting			
Daisha Hollywood						Supporting			
Allan Muses				Guest			Supporting		
Estelita Quintero							Supporting		
Claudia						Supporting			
Eliza Reign						Supporting			
Bigg D							Supporting		
Brooke Valentine							Supporting		
Marcus Black							Supporting		

== Episodes ==
Season	Episodes		Originally released		
Season	Episodes		First released	Last released	Network
1	12		January 1, 2018	March 19, 2018	VH1
2	14		January 2, 2019	March 25, 2019	VH1
3	14		January 6, 2020	April 6, 2020	VH1
4	25	12	August 23, 2021	November 8, 2021	VH1
4	25	13	August 8, 2022	October 17, 2022	VH1
5	25	12	August 14, 2023	October 30, 2023	VH1
5	25	13	January 22, 2024	April 15, 2024	VH1
6	24		November 18, 2024	April 28, 2025	VH1
7	24	12	November 5, 2025	January 28, 2026	BET
7	24	12	April 8, 2026	June 24, 2026	BET

== Development ==
Producers first considered a Love & Hip Hop spin-off set in Miami in 2012, before settling on Atlanta instead, with producer Stefan Springman revealing in the behind-the-scenes special Love & Hip Hop: Dirty Little Secrets: "we found great characters there but it just didn't feel right". Several episodes in Love & Hip Hop: New York's second season were filmed in Miami, originally intended to set up a spin-off starring Teairra Marí and Erica Mena. On July 4, 2014, Scott-Young discussed expanding the franchise to other cities: "we have looked at a bunch of other cities, Miami I’ve looked at as well, so we’re always looking to expand." On November 20, 2014, rapper Trina revealed she had turned down an offer for Love & Hip Hop: Miami.

On February 28, 2016, it was reported that potential spin-offs set in Miami and Houston were in pre-production and the producers were auditioning potential cast members. In April 2016, Trick Daddy and Trina confirmed their involvement in Love & Hip Hop: Miami, despite the latter turning down the offer years earlier. Filming was set to begin in May 2016, with Trick's storyline centered on managing his artists Mike Smiff and Love & Hip Hop: Atlanta's PreMadonna. Plies, Brianna Perry and PreMadonna's husband Buck Thomas were also reported to be cast members at this time, however, all their scenes were left on the cutting room floor during the show's nearly two year development and filming process. On April 20, 2017, after over a year of development hell, it was reported that the show's producers had been granted permission to start filming in South Florida. At some point, the show's producers approached Gucci Mane and his fiancée Keyshia Ka'oir to star in the series, however, they turned it down to film a wedding special for BET.

On May 8, 2017, Gunplay appeared on Love & Hip Hop: Atlanta, leading to speculation that his appearance was intended to set up Love & Hip Hop: Miami.

On August 25, 2017, VH1 announced Love & Hip Hop: Miami would make its series premiere on January 1, 2018.

== Reception ==
=== Critical response ===
Ebony praised the show and Afro-Latina star Amara La Negra for "inviting cultural conversations" about misogynoir and the underrepresentation of black Latinas in mainstream entertainment, hoping the franchise would continue to go in a more "conscious" direction. La Negra was dubbed by Billboard as the show's "breakout star", landing a multi-album record deal with BMG hours after the show's premiere. Critics say that La Negra’s attractiveness has helped the ratings on the show. However, the show was not well received by some Miami locals, including Khia and TS Madison who reviewed it negatively on their web show The Queen's Court, comparing it to a "telemundo" and criticising the casting and production values, with Khia stating "they had everything bad but a bad bitch on there".

=== Ratings ===
The series premiere garnered 1.8 million viewers, making it VH1's best launch since Hip Hop Squares the previous year. The show has struggled with ratings overall compared to its predecessors, which has been attributed to its confusing scheduling changes, having had several different time slots in season two, before settling on Monday nights after Love & Hip Hop: New York.

== Distribution ==
Love & Hip Hop: Miami episodes air regularly on VH1 in the United States.
