= Joseline Hernandez =

Puerto Rican television personality (born 1986)

- Born: November 3, 1986 (age 40); Ponce, Puerto Rico
- Other names: The Puerto Rican; Princess; Shenellica Bettencourt
- Occupations: Television personality; rapper; actress; producer
- Years active: 2012–present
- Partners: Stevie J (2011–2016); Balistic Beats (2017–present)
- Children: 1
- Website: joselinescabaret.com

Joseline Hernandez (born November 3, 1986) is a Puerto Rican reality television personality, rapper, and actress. She is best known for starring in the first six seasons of the VH1 reality television series Love & Hip Hop: Atlanta and the spin-off Stevie J & Joseline: Go Hollywood with Stevie J. She also stars in and co-produces a show on Zeus Network reality series Joseline's Cabaret which premiered in 2020.

== Early life ==
Joseline Hernandez was born in Ponce, Puerto Rico, on November 3, 1986, and grew up in the public housing system of Puerto Rico. Her biological father died from a drug overdose. She moved to Florida at the age of 6, along with her mother, stepfather, her older sister, and her four brothers. Her youngest brother has autism and requires special care. From the age of 15, she began stripping in order to provide for her family. During this time, she was arrested in 2003 and 2007 under the name Shenellica Bettencourt, for lewd and lascivious behavior.

== Career ==
In 2007, Hernandez filmed a failed television pilot for Showtime, centered around a group of strippers working at the Diamond Cabaret in Miami, where she gave her name as Shenellica Bettencourt.

=== Breakthrough, Love & Hip Hop: Atlanta (2012–2017) ===
Hernandez was discovered by Grammy Award-winning record producer Stevie J while performing as a stripper at the Onyx Club in Atlanta. In 2012, she became part of the original cast of Love & Hip Hop: Atlanta, appearing as Stevie J's new artist, an aspiring rapper, singer and actress. It was later revealed that the two were romantically involved, much to the anger of his girlfriend, Mimi Faust. The trio's love triangle became Love & Hip Hop: Atlanta's leading storyline and Hernandez continued as a main cast member for six seasons. It became the highest rated show of the Love & Hip Hop franchise and is one of the highest rating shows on VH1 overall, averaging 3.5 million viewers per episode.

The show's success and notoriety catapulted Hernandez to stardom, leading to appearances at the 2013 AVN Awards, the 2013 BET Hip Hop Awards and the 2015 BET Awards, as well as guest spots on This Is Hot 97, K. Michelle: My Life, The Wendy Williams Show and Hip Hop Squares. She also made several cameo appearances with Stevie in various hip hop and R&B videos, including the music videos for Trey Songz's "Hail Mary", The Game's "I Remember", Ciara's "Body Party" and Faith Evans' "I Deserve It".

During the course of the show, Hernandez released a series of reggaeton and dancehall-influenced singles and music videos, many of which are sung and spoken in Spanish, her native tongue. She performed her songs "Church" and "Stingy with My Kutty Katt" live at Love & Hip Hop: Atlanta's fourth season reunion. She also appeared on Rocko's mixtape Wordplay 2 on the track "Girls Gone Wild" (with Young Dro). In 2016, Hernandez starred with Stevie in the spin-off show Stevie J & Joseline: Go Hollywood, which premiered to 2.6 million viewers.

On June 5, 2016, Hernandez revealed that she had filmed an acting role on Lee Daniels' television series Star. She appeared as Michelle, a stripper, in the pilot episode, which aired December 14, 2016, on Fox. She returned in a recurring role for three more episodes in 2017. She appeared as a guest co-host on The Real from January 23 to 27, 2017, and again from May 1 to 5, 2017. Also in May 2017, she starred in her own television special, Joseline's Special Delivery, which premiered on VH1 and documented the birth of her child. On June 1, 2017, Hernandez quit Love & Hip Hop: Atlanta during the taping of the sixth season's reunion, amid tensions with creator Mona Scott-Young and the show's producers.

=== Joseline's Cabaret (2017–present) ===
On August 6, 2017, Hernandez teased a preview of the song "Run Me My Money" on her Instagram account with the hashtag "#MONAFEA" (Mona, in reference to Mona Scott-Young, and fea, the feminine form of "ugly" in Spanish). It was immediately alleged that "Run Me My Money" is a diss record aimed at Scott-Young. Hernandez commented that "The show people, let's just get this very clear, all them bitches that go through Love & Hip Hop, they work for me. I get royalties on all them asses, so that was the inspiration." However, she did not directly confirm whether she was taking aim at Scott-Young.

Over the next few weeks, Hernandez released snippets of eight new songs, "Mi Cualto", "Slay", "Playboy Bunny", "Papi Lindo", "Finger Fuck a Check", "Spanish Rocksta", "No Me Importa" and "Gold" (feat. Latto). On October 8, 2017, she released "Run Me My Money" in full as a digital download. The following month, she released "Hate Me Now". This song was widely reported to be as a diss track against Cardi B. Although "Hate Me Now" was poorly received by critics, it peaked at number nine on HotNewHipHop's Top 100 Songs chart due to "beef-centric content". In January 2018, Hernandez released a preview of the music video for "Hate Me Now" on her Instagram.

On January 8, 2018, it was reported that Hernandez was filming a new reality show, Joseline Takes Miami, produced by Carlos King. Joseline appeared as a commentator (via satellite link) on the talk show Bossip on WE tv from August 30 until October 4. On March 4, 2019, it was reported that production on Joseline Takes Miami had been stalled and that the network was requesting reshoots. The project never made it to air. On September 29, 2019, Joseline appeared as a guest star on Bravo's Married to Medicine.

On October 11, 2019, it was announced that Joseline had signed a deal with streaming service Zeus Network to create, produce and star in her own reality show franchise. The first incarnation, Joseline's Cabaret: Miami, would premiere January 19, 2020. On January 9, 2020, WE tv announced that Joseline and her boyfriend, Balistic Beats, would appear on an upcoming season of Marriage Boot Camp: Hip Hop Edition, which premiered on February 6, 2020.

== Personal life ==
Hernandez is openly bisexual.

Hernandez and Stevie J once claimed to have married in 2013. However, he admitted in 2016 that the marriage was faked for publicity and in court documents released later that year, she confirmed they were in a long-term relationship and never legally married. The couple's break up was documented in Love & Hip Hop: Atlanta's fifth season. During filming of the show's fifth season reunion special, Hernandez revealed she was pregnant with Stevie's sixth child. She gave birth to their daughter on December 28, 2016.

In 2017, Hernandez began dating music producer Robin Ingouma, known professionally as Balistic Beats. The couple made their relationship public in April 2019 and got engaged soon after. Hernandez later announced via instagram that the two had married on October 11, 2022.

In June 2023, Hernandez was arrested for several misdemeanors, resisting arrest with violence, and two counts of battery on a law enforcement officer in Fort Lauderdale, Florida.

In April 2026, Hernandez announced she is expecting her second child with Balistic Beats.

== Discography ==
=== E.P.s ===
- Rachetera (2023)

=== Compilations ===
- DunChaCha Tour SetList (2024)

=== Singles ===
Title	Year
"Bailar"	2012
"Micolta"	2013
"Shotz" (as Ms. Joseline)	2013
"Been Getting Money" (featuring Cap 1)	2014
"La Negra"	2014
"Stingy with My Kutty Katt" (featuring Stevie J)	2015
"Church"	2016
"Baby Daddy"	2017
"Run Me My Money"	2017
"Hate Me Now"	2017
"SEX Drive"	2020
"Live Your Best Life"	2020
"Finger Fvck a Check"	2021
"Slaaayyy"	2021
"Que Rico"	2021
"Red Velvet Cake"	2021
"Dunchacha"	2021
"Vegas (I Wanna Ride)"	2022
"Every Night of the Week"	2022
"Ghetto Fantasy"	2022
"I Want To"	2022
"Vegas (Sped Up) I Wanna Ride I Wanna Ride"	2023
"Ratchetera"	2023
"No Saving"	2024
"With You"	2024
"DAMELO"	2024
"I Like The Way You Are (Disco Shoes)"	2025
"Bad Bitches"	2026

=== Guest appearances ===
Year	Artist	Song	Album
2016	Rocko	"Gurls Gon Wow" (feat. Joseline Hernandez & Young Dro)	Wordplay 2
2016	Fly Dantoni	"Rico" (feat. Joseline Hernandez)	single
2017	Zaytoven	"All Eyes on Me!" (feat. Joseline Hernandez)	Zaytown Sorority, Vol. 2

== Filmography ==
=== Television ===
Year	Title	Role	Notes
2012–17	Love & Hip Hop: Atlanta	Herself	Main Cast: Season 1-6
2014	This Is Hot 97	Herself	Episode: "Odd Couples"
2014–16	K. Michelle: My Life	Herself	Guest Cast: Season 1-2
2016	Stevie J & Joseline: Go Hollywood	Herself	Main Cast
2016–17	Star	Michelle	Recurring Cast: Season 1
2017	The Real	Herself/Guest Co-Host	Recurring Guest Co-Host: Season 3
2017	Hip Hop Squares	Herself/Contestant	Guest Cast: Season 3-4
2019	Married to Medicine	Herself	Episode: "Ballin' on a Budget"
2020	Love & Hip Hop: Miami	Herself	Main Cast: Season 3
2020-2026	Joseline's Cabaret	Herself	Main Cast
2021	One Mo' Chance: The Reunion	Herself/Guest Co-Host	Episode: "One Mo' Chance The Reunion Part 1-4"
2022	P-Valley	Herself	Episode: "White Knights"
2022	Bobby I Love You, Purrr	Herself	Episode: "It Better Give Seduction"
2023	College Hill: Celebrity Edition	Herself	Main Cast: Season 2
