= List of Baddies episodes =

Baddies is an American reality television series which premiered on the Zeus Network on May 16, 2021. It was developed as an unofficial spin-off to the reality series Bad Girls Club.

As of November 15, 2026, a total of 189 original episodes and 40 specials (reunions and auditions) of Baddies have aired.

== Series overview ==
Season	Episodes	Originally released	
Season	Episodes	First released	Last released
1	12	May 16, 2021	August 22, 2021
2	17	June 12, 2022	October 9, 2022
3	16	January 22, 2023	May 21, 2023
4	23	September 17, 2023	February 25, 2024
5	23	May 5, 2024	October 20, 2024
6	26	November 3, 2024	April 27, 2025
7	25	May 11, 2025	November 2, 2025
8	22	November 23, 2025	April 26, 2026
9	22	May 17, 2026	October 25, 2026
10	TBD	November 8, 2026	TBD, 2027

== Episodes ==
=== Season 1: Baddies ATL (2021) ===
Seven Craft, Judith Jackson, Natalie Nunn, Sarah Oliver, Christina Salgado, Janelle Shanks, Sidney Starr and Tanisha Thomas are introduced as series regulars. Mehgan James served in a recurring capacity.

Baddies season 1 episodes
No. overall	No. in season	Title	Original release date
1	1	"Reunited and It Feels So...BAD"	May 16, 2021
2	2	"Now You See Me, Now You Don't"	May 23, 2021
3	3	"Sit Down or Throw Down"	May 30, 2021
4	4	"Let's Get to the Bag"	June 6, 2021
5	5	"It's About to Go Down"	June 13, 2021
6	6	"Even Baddies Need a Break"	June 20, 2021
7	7	"You and All Yo BULL"	June 27, 2021
8	8	"SURPRISE!"	July 11, 2021
9	9	"It's Time for the TWERKULATOR!"	July 18, 2021
10	10	"All Bad Things Come to An End"	July 25, 2021
11	11	"The Reunion Part 1"	August 15, 2021
12	12	"The Reunion Part 2"	August 22, 2021

=== Season 2: Baddies South (2022) ===
Craft, Jackson, Oliver, Salgado, Shanks and Thomas departed as series regulars. Starr served in a recurring capacity. Elliadria "Persuasian" Griffin, Jelaminah Lanier, Chrisean "Rock" Malone, Gia "Rollie" Mayham, Sashanna "Slim" McLaurin, Anne Moore, Scotlynd Ryan, and Briana Walker joined the cast.

Baddies season 2 episodes
No. overall	No. in season	Title	Original release date
13	1	"Out With the Old, In With the New"	June 12, 2022
14	2	"I Cleaned You Up"	June 19, 2022
15	3	"You Don't Want These Problems"	June 26, 2022
16	4	"Looking Like Luther Vandross"	July 3, 2022
17	5	"Stop The Bus"	July 10, 2022
18	6	"All Good Things Must Come to an End"	July 17, 2022
19	7	"Cashville Ten-a-key!"	July 24, 2022
20	8	"A House Divided"	July 31, 2022
21	9	"Business Before Pleasure"	August 7, 2022
22	10	"Girls Gone Wild"	August 14, 2022
23	11	"Hide & Seek"	August 21, 2022
24	12	"A Baddie Keeps It Pushing"	August 28, 2022
25	13	"Into The Thick of It"	September 4, 2022
26	14	"The End of The Road"	September 11, 2022
27	15	"The Reunion: Part 1"	September 25, 2022
28	16	"The Reunion: Part 2"	October 2, 2022
29	17	"The Reunion: Part 3"	October 9, 2022

=== Season 3: Baddies West (2023) ===
Griffin, Lanier, McLaurin, Moore and Walker departed as series regulars. Damerlin "Biggie" Baez, Stunna Girl, Tommie Lee, Lo London, Cleo "DJ Sky High Baby" Rahman, Monique "Razor" Samuels and Catya Washington joined the cast.

Baddies season 3 episodes
No. overall	No. in season	Title	Original release date
-	SP101	"Auditions: Part 1"	October 23, 2022
"Season 2 stars Rollie, Jela, Scotlynd and Bri pre-screen new potential Baddie cast members."
-	SP102	"Auditions: Part 2"	October 30, 2022
"It’s time to face Natalie, Tommie, and Sukihana on the mainstage. The auditioners have no idea what is in store."
-	SP103	"Auditions: Part 3"	November 6, 2022
"Some girls just can't handle the heat and the judges are not taking it easy on them."
30	1	"The Wild Wild West"	January 22, 2023
"Natalie and the Baddies of the West come together for an epic promo shoot."
31	2	"Welcome to LA"	January 29, 2023
"The ladies head to the Los Angeles Baddie house with tensions already on high alert."
32	3	"Stunna vs Everybody"	February 5, 2023
"Things continue to go left as the girls express their frustrations with Stunna Girl."
33	4	"What Happens in Vegas..."	February 12, 2023
"The ladies take turn up to another level on the Baddie Bus."
34	5	"Stranger In The House"	February 19, 2023
"Natalie attempts to bring Tommie and Stunna together for a talk but the ladies have little to say."
35	6	"Here Comes The Bad Luck"	February 26, 2023
"The Baddies make sure that minor problems don't stop big business."
36	7	"Who's Bad?"	March 5, 2023
"Tommie puts some of the Baddies to the test on the way to Phoenix."
37	8	"I'm The Special Guest"	March 12, 2023
"Things get heated as the Baddies discuss how to split their bag."
38	9	"A Bad Supper"	March 19, 2023
"The Baddies come together for a dinner that they won’t soon forget."
39	10	"Messy Bestie"	March 26, 2023
"An upset Natalie turns on her good friend."
40	11	"Baddie Missing"	April 2, 2023
"Natalie and Scotty discuss the future of their friendship."
41	12	"Back to the Bay"	April 9, 2023
"The Baddies head back to where it started...the Bay Area."
42	13	"Tear the Club Up"	April 16, 2023
"Things become active in the Bay."
43	14	"From The Bay to the Islands"	April 23, 2023
"After a close call in Oakland the Baddies head to St. Croix."
44	15	"Reunion: Part 1"	May 14, 2023
"The Baddies reunite in Los Angeles where things immediately go up!"
45	16	"Reunion: Part 2"	May 21, 2023
"Things become more intense once producer Tommie Lee joins the stage."

=== Season 4: Baddies East (2023–24) ===
Washington, Samuels, Jordan, and Jefferson departed as series regulars. Suzanne "Stunna Girl" Brown, and Cleo "DJ Sky High Baby" Rahman, came back as supporting cast members. Latifa "Tesehki" Malone, Camilla Poindexter, Mariahlynn Araujo, Michele "Siya" Sherman, JaKieta "Sky" Days, Krystal "Smiley" Borrego, Anyssa "Ahna Mac" Santiago, Tamera "Tee" Kissen, Victoria "Woah Vicky" Waldrip, Etheria "Scarface" Ruffin, Destiny "Sukihana" Henderson, and Sapphire Blaze joined the cast.

Baddies season 4 episodes
No. overall	No. in season	Title	Original release date
-	SP101	"Auditions: Part 1"	June 18, 2023
-	SP102	"Auditions: Part 2"	June 25, 2023
"It's time for the contestants to face the main stage judges to show who is a real Baddie."
46	1	"Bad in D.C."	September 17, 2023
"The Baddies arrive on the East Coast and it’s immediately clear that not everyone is welcome."
47	2	"No Promo"	September 24, 2023
"After a failed brunch, Natalie turns the promo shoot all the way up as well."
48	3	"Meet Me Outside"	October 1, 2023
"The Baddies stepped out for their first night in D.C. but not everyone was a fan"
49	4	"Greener Grass"	October 8, 2023
"Tesehki decides to address her issues one-on-one."
50	5	"We Gon' Eat"	October 15, 2023
"After Tesehki gets her lick back, a few of the other ladies feel the need to settle some issues."
51	6	"On to the Next"	October 22, 2023
"The Baddies prepare to make their way to Philly."
52	7	"Go-Kart Road Rage"	October 29, 2023
"The Baddies hope to enjoy a day out in Philly."
53	8	"Someone Came with Baggage"	November 5, 2023
"Once a previous season Baddie returns, the house immediately descends into chaos."
54	9	"Baddies and A Hot Boy"	November 12, 2023
"The Baddies take the night by storm and turn up with Bobby Shmurda!"
55	10	"The Chain Gang"	November 19, 2023
"Suki and Sapphire, aka The Coochie Girls, show up intent on settling some festering beefs."
56	11	"Time to Bite the Apple"	November 26, 2023
"After a heated ending to their Philly excursion, the Baddies head to NYC with more beef to settle."
57	12	"National Forgiveness Day"	December 3, 2023
"The Baddies unite to forgive but all things are definitely not forgotten."
58	13	"Eviction Day"	December 10, 2023
"Rollie has decided it's time for people to go."
59	14	"Time for a Swim"	December 17, 2023
"Natalie calls all the Baddies together for a good ole pool party."
60	15	"Harlem Nights"	December 24, 2023
"The Baddies celebrate their success and enjoy an epic dinner in Harlem."
61	16	"Jamaica Me Crazy"	January 7, 2024
"After the Baddies arrive in Jamaica, Smiley experiences a medical emergency."
62	17	"Hangry Friends"	January 14, 2024
"An otherwise friendly dinner in Jamaica quickly goes left."
63	18	"You Gotta Handle Her"	January 21, 2024
"Sapphire and Suki are on the outs after Suki's fight with Rollie and Scarface."
64	19	"Up Shitz Creek"	January 28, 2024
"Sapphire, Suki, and Mariahlynn clash during a Jamaican raft tour."
65	20	"One Love"	February 4, 2024
"The Baddies unite at the Marley estate for a farewell toast."
66	21	"Reunion: Part 1"	February 11, 2024
"Hosted by the queen of reality television Nene Leakes, along with Janeisha John, the Baddies gather all together for the first time since their East Coast and Jamaican excursions."
67	22	"Reunion: Part 2"	February 18, 2024
"After an explosive start to the reunion, things go up even more."
68	23	"Reunion: Part 3"	February 25, 2024
"As the reunion comes to an end, the Baddies depart with unresolved issues and thoughts of who will return for the next season."

=== Season 5: Baddies Caribbean (2024) ===
Kissen, Borrego, Days, Malone, Poindexter, Ruffin, Sherman, and Waldrip departed as series regulars. Destiny "Sukihana" Henderson, Atasha "Tommie Lee" Jefferson, Aubrey O’Day, Shannon and Shannade Clermont, Misharron "Asian Doll"Allen, Keva "Bigg Keva" Donaldson, JeLisa "Jelly Bean" Bean, Shameika "Nunu" Brailsford, Lajerrika "J.O." Welch, and Etheria "Scarface" Ruffin appeared as supporting cast members. Bianca "Bianca Bonnie" Dupree, Johnece "Kaliwae" Miller, Tatyana "Tinkaabellaaa" Williams, Dayjia "Meatball" Blackwell, Sydonie "Diamond The Body" Person, Tyrrion "Slim2bad" Turner, Fredia "Its Dia" Major, and Gretchen "Big Gretch" Cotto joined the cast.

Baddies season 5 episodes
No. overall	No. in season	Title	Original release date
-	SP101	"Auditions: Part 1"	March 3, 2024
Scores of ladies arrive in Miami from all over to prove why they should be the next Baddie.
-	SP102	"Auditions: Part 2"	March 10, 2024
Things heat up in the pre-screening, before getting even hotter on the main stage.
-	SP103	"Auditions: Part 3"	March 17, 2024
The mainstage goes crazy when one of the contestants challenges Natalie.
69	1	"We Outside Tonight"	May 5, 2024
Before heading to the Caribbean, the Baddies link up in Miami where the tone is immediately set.
70	2	"Flew'd Out"	May 12, 2024
The Baddies make their way to Barbados after a chaotic welcome dinner.
71	3	"Don't Get To Comfortable"	May 19, 2024
After arriving in Barbados, the Baddies turn the house into a Battle Royale.
72	4	"Let's Get Ready To Rumblllllle"	May 26, 2024
The Newbies and Replacements square up in all out battle on the beach in Barbados.
73	5	"Drowned You"	June 2, 2024
Natalie and Tommie rumble in the ocean.
74	6	"Last Night in Barbados"	June 9, 2024
For their last night in Barbados, the Baddies head to the mountain top to clear the air and each other.
75	7	"Welcome To Puerto Rico"	June 16, 2024
The Baddies leave Barbados behind, but make sure to bring the drama with them.
76	8	"We Outside...Fighting"	June 23, 2024
The Baddies ride ATV's through Puerto Rico.
77	9	"Unfriended"	June 30, 2024
As Mariahlynn and Asian Doll continue their beef, Bianca's involvement comes into focus.
78	10	"Eviction Notice"	July 7, 2024
It's the last night in Puerto Rico, but some of the ladies won't make it to the D.R.
79	11	"What You Say About My Momma?"	July 14, 2024
Before leaving for the DR, Ahna gets into a fight with Mariahlynn's mom and aunt.
80	12	"Frenemies And Allies"	July 21, 2024
Kali and Gretchen's bond strengthens after taking on half of the house.
81	13	"Mama Said Knock You Out!"	July 28, 2024
A showdown pops off between Mariahlynn and Ahna, over Ahna fighting Mariah's mom.
82	14	"Fly Like An Eagle"	August 4, 2024
The Baddies zipline through a Dominican forest before getting back to the drama.
83	15	"Happy Birthday Lemmie!"	August 11, 2024
The Baddies turn up at the Zeus CEO's birthday party.
84	16	"Time to Eat or EAT!"	August 18, 2024
The Baddies are going to dinner, but Natalie and Rollie have some unfinished business to settle with ET beforehand.
85	17	"Welcome Home?"	August 25, 2024
The replacements move into the house but aren't met with a warm welcome.
86	18	"Guess Who's Back"	September 1, 2024
Bianca returns and both Sapphire & Mariahlynn have a score to settle with her.
87	19	"It's a Family Reunion"	September 8, 2024
Biggie stops to see her family in Santo Domingo on the last days of the baddies Caribbean tour.
88	20	"Any Last Words?"	September 15, 2024
The ladies spend their final night together at a dinner fit for the baddies.
89 (Note: The three-part Baddies Midwest and Baddies Gone Wild auditions special aired before the Baddies Caribbean reunion.)	21	"Reunion Part 1"	October 6, 2024
The ladies reunite in Los Angeles to settle things once and for all.
90	22	"Reunion Part 2"	October 13, 2024
Gretchen and Jela get their lick back. Ahna and Nunu finally get their fair fight.
91	23	"Reunion Part 3"	October 20, 2024
Heaven and Dia finally get their fair fight after Dia shaded Heaven in a song. Rollie and Tommie unexpectedly get into a fight.

=== Season 6: Baddies Midwest (2024–25) ===
Blackwell, Araujo, Turner, Major, Cotto, Miller, Lewis, and Dupree departed as series regulars. Chrisean "Rock" Malone, Valerie "Akbar V" Raven, Jaidyn Alexis, Sashanna "Slim" McLaurin, and Atasha "Tommie Lee" Jefferson appeared/returned as supporting cast members. Ivori Minor, Jazmin Re’Nae, Rachel "Badd Dolly" Stevenson, Alexis "Big Lex, Not Da Lil One" Radcliff, Raven “Yoshi Banks” Mitchell, Paula "Pretty P" Peterson, Emma Alayo, and Summer "None Other" Monroe joined the cast. Melanie "Big Shroom" Fox makes an appearance throughout the series.

Baddies season 6 episodes
No. overall	No. in season	Title	Original release date
-	SP101	“Auditions: Part 1”	September 15, 2024
-	SP102	“Auditions: Part 2”	September 22, 2024
-	SP103	“Auditions: Part 3”	September 29, 2024
92	1	“Sister Sister”	November 3, 2024
93	2	“Welcome To Detroit”	November 3, 2024
94	3	“Motor City Mouth”	November 10, 2024
95	4	“BaddieMania”	November 17, 2024
96	5	“Outside in the D”	November 24, 2024
97	6	“Cider Anymore?”	December 1, 2024
98	7	“Your Tour Stops Here!”	December 8, 2024
99	8	“Where’s The Beef?”	December 15, 2024
100	9	“BFF No More”	December 22, 2024
101	10	“Who’s Going Home Now?”	December 29, 2024
102	11	“Prank Gone Wrong”	January 5, 2025
103	12	“Wild’n! Wild’n!”	January 12, 2025
104	13	“You Not a Baddie, Period!”	January 19, 2025
105	14	“Slim vs Summer: Round 2”	January 26, 2025
106	15	“Baddies of the Corn”	February 2, 2025
107	16	“Tear The Club Up”	February 9, 2025
108	17	“It’s Eviction Day”	February 16, 2025
109	18	“Bunnies, Brawls and BB’s”	February 23, 2025
110	19	“Aloha!”	March 2, 2025
111	20	“She and Her vs She and Her”	March 9, 2025
112	21	“911”	March 16, 2025
113	22	“Dolly Vengeance”	March 23, 2025
114	23	“The Final Chapter”	March 30, 2025
115	24	“Reunion Part 1”	April 13, 2025
116	25	“Reunion Part 2”	April 20, 2025
117	26	“Reunion Part 3”	April 27, 2025

=== Season 7: Baddies Africa (2025) ===
Alayo, Lanier, Chrisean “Rock” Malone, Latifa “Tesehki” Malone, Williams, Jaidyn Alexis, Akbar V, Jazmine, Mitchell, McLaurin and Yarber departed as series regulars. Suzanne “Stunna Girl” Brown and Atasha “Tommie Lee” Jefferson appeared/returned as supporting cast members. Damerlin "Biggie" Baez was put in “Baddie Timeout”, which means that she may or may not make an appearance during the season. Amber Rose, Marissa Da’Nae, Choco Brown, Elsie Kay, Russian Kream, Javen “Kold Killa” Starghill, Fania “Fana” Cherry, Tavii Babii, Kamae “Kay Rican” Rodriguez and Latina Rose joined the cast.

Baddies season 7 episodes
No. overall	No. in season	Title	Original release date
-	SP101	“Auditions: Part 1”	March 23, 2025
-	SP102	“Auditions: Part 2”	March 30, 2025
-	SP103	“Auditions: Part 3”	April 6, 2025
118	1	“Before the Motherland”	May 11, 2025
119	2	“Battle of the Baddies”	May 18, 2025
120	3	“Meet Me Out Back”	May 25, 2025
121	4	“Trio vs. Trio vs. Trio”	June 1, 2025
122	5	“Baddie Trouble”	June 8, 2025
123	6	“Baddies in Safari”	June 15, 2025
124	7	“No Fine Wine”	June 22, 2025
125	8	“Chain Reaction”	June 29, 2025
126	9	“Drumbeats and BEATS”	July 6, 2025
127	10	“She’s Baaaack!”	July 13, 2025
128	11	“Brawls “R” Us”	July 20, 2025
129	12	"Oh Where Is Dolly"	July 27, 2025
130	13	"Baddie Ninjitsu"	August 3, 2025
131	14	“Welcome to Kenya”	August 10, 2025
132	15	“Scores to Settle”	August 17, 2025
133	16	“Saddle Up”	August 24, 2025
134	17	“Tavii Said, “Sh$! Got Real!”	August 31, 2025
135	18	“Baddies Give Back”	September 7, 2025
136	19	“Get Down Off that Camel”	September 14, 2025
137	20	“London Bridges”	September 21, 2025
138	21	“Fists and Chips”	September 28, 2025
139	22	“Dinner’s Canceled”	October 5, 2025
140	23	“Reunion Part 1”	October 19, 2025
141	24	“Reunion Part 2”	October 26, 2025
142	25	“Reunion Part 3”	November 2, 2025

=== Season 8: Baddies USA: Chapter 1 (2025–26) ===
Lanier, Mariahlynn, Chrisean "Rock" Malone, Latifa "Tesehki" Malone, Williams, Ford, Smiley, Big Gretch, Henderson, Jefferson, and Shanks will return as series regulars. DJ Sky, Poindexter, Judi Jai, Sarah Oliver, Persuasian, Lo London, Bri, Seven, Cat and Daisy Dukes appeared as supporting cast members.

==== Baddies season 8 episodes ====
No. overall	No. in season	Title	Original release date
143	1	"Founder's Day"	November 23, 2025
"The Baddies return to launch Chapter 1, setting the stage for new dynamics and immediate confrontations."
144	2	"Man Down"	November 30, 2025
"An early argument escalates quickly, forcing the ladies to choose sides right at the beginning of the journey."
145	3	"The Executive Branch"	December 7, 2025
"The hierarchy of the house is tested when major figures try to establish ground rules."
146	4	"Bad Meets Wild"	December 14, 2025
"The energy reaches a boiling point during a wild night out, leading to fractured alliances."
147	5	"Unlikely Alliances"	December 21, 2025
"Surprising friendships form as some of the girls realize they need backup to survive the house drama."
148	6	"A Big Fight in the Big Apple"	December 28, 2025
"The tour stops in New York City, where old beef resurfaces in a massive public showdown."
149	7	"Family Matters"	January 4, 2026
"Personal histories and outside relationships complicate the situation inside the house."
150	8	"Watch Your Mouth!"	January 11, 2026
"Words cut deep during a heated dinner discussion, resulting in immediate physical retaliation."
151	9	"Windy City Welcome"	January 18, 2026
"The Baddies touch down in Chicago, but the cold weather does nothing to cool down their tempers."
152	10	"Baddie Fragmentation"	January 25, 2026
"The house officially splits into two distinct factions after an intense morning meeting."
153	11	"Get in Formation"	February 1, 2026
"Preparation for the upcoming live events forces the girls to try and work together, despite the tension."
154	12	"What Up Doe"	February 8, 2026
"The tour heads to Detroit, bringing local drama to the forefront as the cast expands."
155	13	"Big ME"	February 15, 2026
"Individual egos clash when the focus turns to who is pulling the most weight on the tour."
156	14	"Cabinet Meeting"	February 22, 2026
"A serious sit-down meeting is called to address safety and behavior concerns before the next city."
157	15	"Maced"	March 1, 2026
"Chaos erupts in the transport vans, leading to an extreme intervention to separate the fighting cast members."
158	16	"Dinner For Two"	March 8, 2026
"Two major rivals attempt to clear the air in a private setting, but things don't go as planned."
159	17	"Shaking the Table"	March 15, 2026
"A celebratory dinner turns upside down when a sudden revelation catches everyone off guard."
160	18	"Baddie Invasion"	March 22, 2026
"The final tour performance brings out massive crowds and peak performance energy from the entire crew."
161	19	"Shattered Glass"	March 29, 2026
"The final night in the house ends with a bang as lingering issues are settled before packing up."
162	20	"Reunion Part 1"	April 12, 2026
"The cast reunites on stage to address the early season drama, and hands are thrown immediately."
163	21	"Reunion Part 2"	April 19, 2026
"The reunion hosts try to maintain order as the supporting cast members hit the stage to air their grievances."
164	22	"Reunion Part 3"	April 26, 2026
"The dramatic conclusion of Chapter 1 features final face-offs and a look ahead to what is next."

=== Season 9: Baddies USA: Chapter 2 (2026) ===
Suzanne "Stunna Girl" Brown, Etheria "Scarface" Ruffin and Ivori Minor will return as series regulars. Cast members from Joseline's Cabaret include Latasha "Ms. Wet-Wet" Smith, Shaniqua "ShowGirlNeek" Hood, Envy Erica, Lexi Gold, Jeanette "Ms. Egypt" Moore, Kaniyah "Miss Kaniyah" Whipple and Amber "Amber Ali" Ward.

Cast members from Baddies Gone Wild include Dru Emery "Hurricane Em" Smith, Oxy Pirl, Bahati Hassani and Tierrinie "Tee-Tee" Favors. Cast members from NowThatsTV alumni include Shamisha "Pressure" Adams, who will appear as part of the main cast. Scotlynd "Scotty" Ryan and Yaritza "DJ Blue Diamond" Attias will also appear as supporting cast members.

==== Baddies season 9 episodes ====
No. overall	No. in season	Title	Original release date
165	1	"Home of the Brave"	May 17, 2026
"The Baddies touch down for Chapter 2, bringing intense energy, unresolved rivalries, and fresh faces ready to claim their spot."
166	2	"Checked at Soundcheck"	May 24, 2026
"Tensions explode during the first official soundcheck as the girls struggle to coordinate and personal issues take center stage."
167	3	"It's Indeed Showtime"	May 31, 2026
"It is officially performance night, but backstage chaos threatens to derail the entire show before it even starts."
168	4	"We Know What This Means"	June 7, 2026
"In the dramatic aftermath of their first major event, the cast is left dealing with the fallout of fractured alliances."
169	5	“Hostile Takeover”	June 14, 2026
“Uninvited guests crash a Baddie meeting, forcing the ladies to stand on business.”
170	6	“Baddies Bus Brawlsss”	June 21, 2026
“A road trip to Phoenix turns into complete mayhem as beefs are addressed in an enclosed space.”
171	7	“From Setlists to Set Ups”	June 28, 2026
“The Baddies as they face each other for the first time since arriving in Phoenix.”
172	8	“Let the Show Continue”	July 5, 2026
“The Baddies put on a show for the next tour stop in Phoenix, AZ.”
173	9	“What Was The Treason?”	July 12, 2026
“The Baddies met up to get to the bottom of broken aillances and group beefs.”
174	10	“What Happens In Vegas..”	July 19, 2026
“The Baddies hit the road full throttle as they head to Sin City.”
175	11	“A Real Baddie Party”	July 26, 2026
“The Baddies host a day party for their tour stop in Sin City.”
176	12	“The Electric Slide”	August 2, 2026
“The Baddies head to Dallas, where a night at the club ends with a shocking turn.”
177	13	“Line It Up Dance”	August 9, 2026
“A line dancing activity ends early when the Baddies put more than boots on the ground.”
178	14	“New Baddies in Town”	August 16, 2026
“In Dallas, some Baddies bow out as new faces join the tour.”
179	15	“Newbies to the Front”	August 23, 2026
“New girls step in, causing a roller coaster of drama as the Baddies head to Orlando.”
180	16	“Space and Opp-ortunity”	August 30, 2026
“Resolutions turn into retaliation when Natalie brings the new ladies face-to-face with old opps.”
181	17	“Amuse Me”	September 6, 2026
“The Baddies take the stage for their final show before one last roller coaster of a meeting.”
182	18	“The Big Drop”	September 13, 2026
“The Baddies go off the rails as the final meetup erupts into complete chaos.”
183	19	“Reunion: Part 1”	October 4, 2026
“The Baddies reunite on stage to discuss the bonds that were broken during the season.”
184	20	"Reunion: Part 2"	October 11, 2026
"The battle of the trios tests friendships and leaves shocking results on the reunion stage."
185	21	“Reunion: Part 3”	October 18, 2026
“The reunion stage heats up as the BGW and Cabaret girls take the stage and add to the chaos.”
186	22	“Reunion: Part 4”	October 25, 2026
“The reunion closes the night with final fades as the epilogue to Chapter 2.”

=== Season 10: Baddies USA Chapter 3 (2026-2027) ===
Christina Salgado, Kendra “Sapphire Blaze” Lewis, Destiny “Sukihana” Henderson, Krystal “Smiley” Borrego, Jaidyn Alexis and Johnece “Kaliwae” Miller will return as series regulars. Cast members from Baddies Gone Wild include Lauren Michelle Kinsey, Carla “Dava” Dawson, Baby Tyson, Chelsea “Marie Minksss” Walker, Becky London and Alana Dorsey.

Cast members from NowThatsTv alumni include Kashmere and Lori The Biggest.

Baddies season 10 episodes

No. overall	No. in season	Title	Original release date
187	1	“Kick This Off The Right Way”	November 8, 2026
“The Baddies steps into their Diamond season, where big personalities meet big expectations.”
188	2	“Hiiiiii. What We Doing?”	November 8, 2026
“A bar room brawl erupts after Natalie welcomes the newbies to the Diamond season.”
189	3	“Let's Get the Ball Rolling”	November 15, 2026
“The Baddies head to San Francisco, but old tensions and new feuds threaten a fresh start.”
