= Baddies season 6 =

2024 American reality television season

Baddies
- Season 6
- Starring: Natalie Nunn; Jelaminah "Jela" Lanier; Gia "Rollie" Mayham; Scotlynd "Scotty" Ryan; Damerlin "Biggie" Baez; Latifa "Tesehki" Malone; Anyssa "Ahna Mac" Santiago; Sydonie "Diamond The Body" Person; Tatyana "Tinkaabellaaa" Williams; Jaidyn Alexis; Ivori Minor; Jazmin Re'Nae; Rachel "Badd Dolly" Stevenson; Alexis "Big Lex, Not Da Lil' One" Radcliff; Raven "Yoshi Banks" Mitchell; Emma Alayo; Paula "Pretty P" Peterson; Summer "Summer None Other" Thomas; Shameika "NuNu" Brailsford
- No. of episodes: 26

Release
- Original network: Zeus Network
- Original release: November 3, 2024 – April 27, 2025

Season chronology
- ← Previous; Season 4 Next → Season 7

The sixth season of Baddies, officially titled Baddies Midwest, premiered on the Zeus Network on November 3, 2024 and was filmed throughout the Midwest subregion of the United States. The season was announced with a teaser video on July 15, 2024, and casting auditions were held in Detroit, Michigan along with its spinoff series "Baddies Gone Wild" on July 27, 2024.

== Production ==
Auditions for Baddies Midwest and its spin-off Baddies Gone Wild were held in Detroit, Michigan on July 27, 2024. The trailer was released on October 27, 2024, and the premiere date was announced for November 3. A premiere party was held at the Fine Arts Theatre in Beverly Hills, California that evening.

== Cast ==
List of Baddies Midwest main cast members
Name	Age (Note: Age at time of filming)	First appearance	Hometown
Natalie Nunn	39	Bad Girls Club 4: Los Angeles	Oakland, California
Jelaminah "Jela" Lanier	34	Bad Girls Club 14: Back for More	Houston, Texas
Gia "Rollie" Mayham	32	Jerry Springer	North Las Vegas, Nevada
Scotlynd "Scotty" Ryan	27	Baddies South	Charlotte, North Carolina
Damerlin "Biggie" Baez	28	Baddies West	Providence, Rhode Island
Latifa "Tesehki" Malone	29	Blueface & Chrisean: Crazy in Love	Jessup, Maryland
Anyssa "Ahna Mac" Santiago	24	Baddies East	Plainfield, New Jersey
Sydonie "Diamond The Body" Person	32	DejaVu Miami	Miami, Florida
Tatyana "Tinkaabellaaa" Williams	25	Baddies Caribbean	Philadelphia, Pennsylvania
Valerie "Akbar V" Raven	35	Love & Hip Hop: Atlanta 8	Atlanta, Georgia
Jaidyn Alexis	25	Bad vs. Wild	Los Angeles, California
Ivori Minor	21	Baddies of Las Vegas 1	Los Angeles, California
Aneshia "Badd Dolly" Sibley	32	Pick a Side	Ridgeland, Mississippi
Raven "Yoshi Banks" Mitchell	25	Bad 2 Da Bone	Chicago, Illinois
Jazmine Re'Nae Miller	32	Baddies Midwest Auditions	Detroit, Michigan
Alexis "Big Lex" Radcliff	23	Baddies Midwest Auditions	Akron, Ohio
Emma Alayo	23	Baddies Midwest Auditions	Grand Rapids, Michigan
Paula "Pretty P" McEwen	30	Baddies Midwest Auditions	Milwaukee, Wisconsin
Summer "Summer None Other" Thomas	27	Baddies Midwest Auditions	Detroit, Michigan

List of Baddies Midwest replacements & supporting cast members
Name	Age	First appearance	Hometown	Replaced
Shameika "NuNu" Brailsford	29	Baddies Caribbean	Miami, Florida	Yoshi

Supporting cast	Age	First appearance	Hometown
Chrisean "Rock" Malone	24	Blue Girls Club 1	Baltimore, Maryland
Sashanna "Slim" McLaurin	27	One Mo' Chance 2	Salisbury, Maryland
Sidney “Starr” Favors	35	Love & Hip Hop: New York 9	Chicago, Illinois
Atasha "Tommie Lee" Jefferson	40	Love & Hip Hop: Atlanta 5	Newark, New Jersey
Cleaira "Melanie Fox" Yarber	24	Young And Reckless	Milwaukee, Wisconsin

=== Cast duration ===
Cast member	Episodes																							Reunion		
Cast member	1	2	3	4	5	6	7	8	9	10	11	12	13	14	15	16	17	18	19	20	21	22	23	24	25	26
Natalie	Featured	Featured	Featured	Featured	Featured	Featured	Featured	Featured	Featured	Featured	Featured	Featured	Featured	Featured	Featured	Featured	Featured	Featured	Featured	Featured	Featured	Featured	Featured	Featured	Featured	Featured
Rollie	Featured	Featured	Featured	Featured	Featured	Featured	Featured	Featured	Featured	Featured	Featured	Featured	Featured	Featured	Featured	Featured	Featured	Featured	Featured	Featured	Featured	Featured	Featured	Featured	Featured	Featured
Jela	Featured	Featured	Featured	Featured	Featured	Featured	Featured	Featured	Featured	Featured	Featured	Featured	Featured	Featured	Featured	Featured	Featured	Featured	Featured	Featured	Featured	Featured	Featured	Featured	Featured	Featured
Scotty	Featured	Featured	Featured	Featured	Featured	Featured	Featured	Featured	Featured	Featured	Featured	Featured	Featured	Featured	Featured	Featured	Featured	Featured	Featured	Featured	Featured	Featured	Featured	Featured	Featured	Featured
Biggie	Featured	Featured	Featured	Featured	Featured	Featured	Featured	Featured	Featured	Featured	Featured	Featured	Featured	Featured	Featured	Featured	Featured	Featured	Featured	Featured	Featured	Featured	Featured	Featured	Featured	Featured
Ahna Mac	Featured	Featured	Featured	Featured	Featured	Featured	Featured	Featured	Featured	Featured	Featured	Featured	Featured	Featured	Featured	Featured	Featured	Featured	Featured	Featured	Featured	Featured	Featured	Featured	Featured	Featured
Tinkaabellaaa	Featured	Featured	Featured	Featured	Featured	Featured	Featured	Featured	Featured	Featured	Featured	Featured	Featured	Featured	Featured	Featured	Featured	Featured	Featured	Featured	Featured	Featured	Featured	Featured	Featured	Featured
Tesehki	Featured	Featured	Featured	Featured	Featured	Featured	Featured	Featured	Featured	Featured	Featured	Featured	Featured	Featured	Featured	Featured	Featured	Featured	Featured	Featured	Featured	Featured	Featured	Featured	Featured	Featured
Jaidyn	Featured	Featured	Featured	Featured	Featured	Featured	Featured	Featured	Featured	Featured	Featured	Featured	Featured	Absent	Featured	Featured	Featured	Featured	Featured	Featured	Featured	Featured	Featured	Featured	Featured	Featured
Jazmin	Featured	Absent	Featured	Featured	Featured	Featured	Featured	Featured	Featured	Featured	Featured	Featured	Featured	Featured	Featured	Featured	Featured	Featured	Featured	Featured	Featured	Featured	Featured	Featured	Featured	Featured
Pretty P	Featured	Absent	Featured	Featured	Featured	Featured	Featured	Featured	Featured	Featured	Featured	Featured	Featured	Featured	Featured	Featured	Featured	Featured	Featured	Featured	Featured	Featured	Featured	Featured	Featured	Featured
Summer	Featured	Absent	Featured	Featured	Featured	Featured	Featured	Featured	Featured	Featured	Featured	Featured	Featured	Featured	Featured	Featured	Featured	Featured	Featured	Featured	Featured	Featured	Featured	Featured	Featured	Featured
Big Lex	Featured	Absent	Featured	Featured	Featured	Featured	Featured	Featured	Featured	Featured	Featured	Featured	Featured	Featured	Featured	Featured	Featured	Featured	Featured	Featured	Featured	Featured	Featured	Featured	Featured	Featured
Ivori	Featured	Absent	Featured	Featured	Featured	Featured	Featured	Featured	Featured	Featured	Featured	Featured	Featured	Featured	Featured	Absent	Absent	Absent	Featured	Featured	Featured	Featured	Featured	Featured	Featured	Featured
NuNu													Entered (Note: NuNu replaces Yoshi.)	Featured	Featured	Featured	Featured	Featured	Featured	Featured	Featured	Featured	Featured	Featured	Absent	Featured
Badd Dolly	Featured	Absent	Featured	Featured	Featured	Featured	Featured	Featured	Featured	Featured	Featured	Featured	Featured	Featured	Featured	Featured	Featured	Featured	Featured	Featured	Featured	Left (Note: Badd Dolly left from Hawaii due to health issues.)		Featured	Featured	Featured
Akbar V	Featured	Featured	Featured	Featured	Featured	Featured	Featured	Featured	Absent	Featured	Featured	Featured	Featured	Featured	Featured	Featured	Absent	Featured	Left (Note: Akbar V quit from St. Louis out of fear for her safety.)							
Emma	Featured	Absent	Featured	Featured	Featured	Featured	Featured	Featured	Featured	Featured	Featured	Featured	Featured	Featured	Removed (Note: Emma was sent home in Indianapolis due to Natalie feeling like she wasn't entertaining enough.)									Featured	Absent	Featured
Diamond	Featured	Featured	Featured	Featured	Featured	Featured	Featured	Featured	Featured	Featured	Featured	Featured	Featured	Featured	Left (Note: Diamond quit from Indianapolis due to a family emergency.)									Featured	Featured	
Yoshi	Featured	Absent	Featured	Featured	Featured	Featured	Removed (Note: Yoshi was sent home in Detroit due to Natalie feeling like the house wasn't good for her.)																	Featured	Absent	Featured
Supporting cast members
Chrisean	Featured (Note: Chrisean meet with the cast in Tulsa for a sit-down with Tesehki.)	Featured																								
Slim								Entered (Note: Slim enters as an assistant.)	Featured	Absent	Featured	Absent	Featured	Featured	Featured	Featured	Removed (Note: Slim was sent home in St. Louis after multiple physical alterations with Rollie and Summer and quitting her assistant job.)							Featured	Absent	Featured
Sidney											Appeared (Note: Sidney appears with the Baddies at the club in Chicago.)															
Tommie																	Appeared (Note: Tommie appears in a videocall with Natalie.)	Featured (Note: Tommie visits the cast in St. Louis.)	Featured							
Mel																						Featured (Note: Melanie appears in Hawai during a physical altercation with Ivori.)	Featured	Featured		

=== Reunion ===
The final episode was followed by a three-part reunion special, hosted by Janeisha John, Bobby Lytes and Saucy Santana, which was released on April 13, 2025. Chrisean Rock, Tommie Lee and Akbar V were not present at the reunion taping. Slim and Melanie Fox appeared at the reunion despite being supporting cast. Melanie Fox, Jela and Diamond The Body all left the reunion during filming.

Baddies S6 Reunion Seating Arrangement
Viewer's Left						HOSTS		Viewer's Right				
Emma	Tinkaabellaaa	Ivori	PrettyP	Jazmin	Ahna Mac	Saucy Santana	Janeisha John	~~Melanie~~ (Note: Mel attends the reunion, but leaves before enters the stage.)	Badd Dolly	Big Lex	Summer	~~Diamond~~
~~Jela~~	Biggie	Tesehki	Rollie	Scotty	Natalie	Saucy Santana	Janeisha John	Slim	Jaidyn	Yoshi	NuNu	

== After filming ==
- Natalie, Scotlynd, Jela, Ahna Mac, Biggie, Diamond The Body, Rollie, Tinkaabellaaa, Summer, Big Lex and Badd Dolly were judges for the Baddies Africa Audtions.
- Natalie, Scotlynd, Rollie, Ahna Mac, Diamond The Body, Summer, Big Lex, Badd Dolly,.Pretty P & Ivori returned for the seventh season of Baddies Africa with Tommie making an appearance while Biggie is on timeout and did not return for this season.
- Tesehki, Chrisean and Rollie appeared as guests on The Jason Lee Show.
- Natalie, Scotlynd, Rollie, Jela, Ahna Mac, Diamond The Body, Biggie, Tesehki, Summer, Big Lex, Badd Dolly, Tinkaabellaaa, Chrisean, Nunu and Tommie returned for the eighth season of Baddies USA
- Natalie, Rollie, Diamond The Body, Biggie, Tesekhi, Summer, Big Lex, Badd Dolly, Tinkaabellaaa, Tommie and Ivori returned for the ninth season of Baddies USA Chapter Two.
- Natalie, Scotlynd, Rollie, Tesekhi, Biggie, Summer, Big Lex, Badd Dolly, Tinkaabellaaa, Tommie, Ivori, Pretty P, and Jaidyn Alexis returned for the iconic tenth season of Baddies USA Chapter Three

== Episodes ==
Baddies season 6 episodes
No. overall	No. in season	Title	Original release date
92	1	"Sister Sister"	November 3, 2024
93	2	"Welcome to Detroit"	November 3, 2024
94	3	"Motor City Mouth"	November 10, 2024
95	4	"BaddieMania"	November 17, 2024
96	5	"Outside in the D"	November 24, 2024
97	6	"Cider Anyone?"	December 1, 2024
98	7	"Your Tour Stops Here!"	December 8, 2024
99	8	"Where's the Beef?"	December 15, 2024
100	9	"BFF No More"	December 22, 2024
101	10	"Who's Going Home Now?"	December 29, 2024
102	11	"Prank Gone Wrong"	January 5, 2025
103	12	"Wild'n Wild'n!"	January 12, 2025
104	13	"You Not a Baddie, Period!"	January 19, 2025
105	14	"Slim vs. Summer: Round 2"	January 26, 2025
106	15	"Baddies of the Corn"	February 2, 2025
107	16	"Tear The Club Up"	February 9, 2025
108	17	"It's Eviction Day"	February 16, 2025
109	18	"Bunnies, Brawls and BB's"	February 23, 2025
110	19	"Aloha!"	March 2, 2025
111	20	"She and Her vs. She and Her"	March 9, 2025
112	21	"911"	March 16, 2025
113	22	"Dolly Vengeance"	March 23, 2025
114	23	"The Final Chapter"	March 30, 2025
115	24	"Baddies Midwest Reunion: Part 1"	April 13, 2025
116	25	"Baddies Midwest Reunion: Part 2"	April 20, 2025
117	26	"Baddies Midwest Reunion: Part 3"	April 27, 2025
