= Baddies season 4 =

2023 American reality television season

Baddies
- Season 4
- Starring: Natalie Nunn; Chrisean "Rock" Malone; Gia "Rollie" Mayham; Scotlynd "Scotty" Ryan; Damerlin "Biggie" Baez; Suzanne "Stunna Girl" Brown; JaKeita "Sky" Days; Tamera "Tee" Kissen; Victoria "Woah Vicky" Waldrip; Michele "Siya" Sherman; Krystal "Smiley" Borrego; Anyssa "Ahna Mac" Santiago; Latifa "Tesehki" Malone; Camilla Poindexter; Mariahlynn Carattini; Etheria "Scarface" Ruffin; Kendra "Sapphire" Lewis; Destiny "Sukihana" Henderson
- No. of episodes: 23

Release
- Original network: Zeus Network
- Original release: September 17, 2023 – February 25, 2024

Season chronology
- ← Previous; Season 3 Next → Season 5

The fourth season of Baddies, officially titled Baddies East, premiered on the Zeus Network on September 17, 2023. It was filmed throughout the Eastern part of the United States, including Atlanta, Charlotte, Nashville, New Orleans, and Houston, with a vacation to Jamaica.

== Cast ==
List of Baddies East main cast members
Original Cast	Age (Note: Age at time of filming)	First appearance	Hometown
Anyssa "Ahna Mac" Santiago	25	Baddies East Auditions	Plainfield, New Jersey
Camilla Poindexter	39	Bad Girls Club 8: Las Vegas	Long Beach, California
Chrisean "Rock" Malone	25	Blue Girls Club 1	Baltimore, Maryland
Gia “Rollie” Mayham	33	One Mo' Chance 1	North Las Vegas, Nevada
JaKeita "Sky" Days	42	Black Ink Crew	Harlem, New York
Krystal "Smiley" Borrego	29	Baddies East Auditions	Miami, Florida
Latifa "Tesehki" Malone	30	Blueface & Chrisean: Crazy in Love	Jessup, Maryland
Mariahlynn Jacoby Araujo	35	Love & Hip Hop: New York 6	Jersey City, New Jersey
Michele "Siya" Sherman	39	Sisterhood of Hip Hop	Brooklyn, New York
Natalie Nunn	41	Bad Girls Club 4: Los Angeles	Oakland, California
Scotlynd "Scotty" Ryan	28	Baddies South	Charlotte, North Carolina
Suzanne "Stunna Girl" Brown	27	Baddies West	Sacramento, California
Tamera "Tee" Kissen	31	Wild n' Out	Los Angeles, California
Victoria "Woah Vicky" Waldrip	26	Baddies East	Atlanta, Georgia

List of Baddies East replacement cast members
Replacement Cast	Age	First appearance	Hometown	Replaced
Etheria "Scarface" Ruffin	27	South Central Baddies 1	Los Angeles, California	Stunna Girl
Destiny "Sukihana" Henderson	33	Love & Hip Hop: Miami 3	Wilmington, Delaware	Woah Vicky
Kendra "Sapphire" Lewis	35	Love & Hip Hop: Miami	Miami, Florida	Chrisean
Damerlin "Biggie" Baez	29	Baddies West	Providence, Rhode Island	Siya

List of Baddies East supporting cast members
Supporting Cast	Age	First appearance	Hometown
Cleo "DJ Sky High Baby" Rahman	33	Bad Boys: Los Angeles	Baltimore, Maryland
Janet "Jay" Guzman	29	Blueface & Chrisean: Crazy in Love	Montebello, California
Marchinee “Marsh” Lewis	28	Blueface & Chrisean: Crazy in Love	Los Angeles, California
Catya "Cat" Washington	39	Bad Girls Club 5: Miami	Philadelphia, Pennsylvania

== Cast duration ==
Cast member	Episodes																				Reunion		
Cast member	1	2	3	4	5	6	7	8	9	10	11	12	13	14	15	16	17	18	19	20	21	22	23
Ahna	Featured	Featured	Featured	Featured	Featured	Featured	Featured	Featured	Featured	Featured	Featured	Featured	Featured	Featured	Featured	Featured	Featured	Featured	Featured	Featured	Featured	Featured	Featured
Camilla	Featured	Featured	Featured	Featured	Featured	Featured	Featured	Featured	Featured	Featured	Featured	Featured	Featured	Featured	Featured	Featured	Featured	Featured	Featured	Featured	Featured	Featured	Featured
Mariahlynn	Featured	Featured	Absent	Featured	Featured	Featured	Featured	Featured	Featured	Featured	Featured	Featured	Featured	Featured	Featured	Featured	Featured	Featured	Featured	Featured	Featured	Featured	Featured
Natalie	Featured	Featured	Featured	Featured	Featured	Featured	Featured	Featured	Featured	Featured	Featured	Featured	Featured	Featured	Featured	Featured	Featured	Featured	Featured	Featured	Featured	Featured	Featured
Rollie	Featured	Featured	Featured	Featured	Featured	Featured	Featured	Featured	Featured	Featured	Featured	Featured	Featured	Featured	Featured	Featured	Featured	Featured	Featured	Featured	Featured	Featured	Featured
Scotty	Featured	Featured	Featured	Featured	Featured	Featured	Featured	Featured	Featured	Featured	Featured	Featured	Featured	Featured	Featured	Featured	Featured	Featured	Featured	Featured	Featured	Featured	Featured
Sky	Featured	Featured	Featured	Featured	Featured	Featured	Featured	Featured	Featured	Featured	Featured	Featured	Featured	Featured	Featured	Featured	Featured	Featured	Featured	Featured	Featured	Featured	Featured
Tesehki	Featured	Absent	Featured	Featured	Featured	Featured	Featured	Featured	Featured	Featured	Featured	Featured	Featured	Featured	Featured	Featured	Featured	Featured	Featured	Featured	Featured	Featured	Featured
Scarface						Entered (Note: Scarface replaces Stunna Girl.)	Featured	Featured	Featured	Featured	Featured	Featured	Featured	Featured	Featured	Featured	Featured	Featured	Featured	Featured	Featured	Featured	Featured
Biggie					Appeared			Entered (Note: Biggie replaces Siya.)	Featured	Featured	Featured	Featured	Featured	Featured	Featured	Featured	Featured	Featured	Featured	Featured	Featured	Featured	Featured
Sapphire								Entered (Note: Sapphire replaces Chrisean.)	Absent	Featured	Featured	Featured	Featured	Featured	Featured	Featured	Featured	Featured	Featured	Featured	Featured	Featured	Featured
Sukihana								Entered (Note: Sukihana replaces Woah Vicky.)	Absent	Featured	Featured	Featured	Featured	Featured	Featured	Absent	Featured	Featured	Featured	Featured	Featured	Featured	Featured
Smiley	Featured	Featured	Featured	Featured	Featured	Featured	Featured	Featured	Featured	Featured	Featured	Featured	Featured	Featured	Featured	Featured	Left (Note: Smiley voluntarily left the show after being ganged up by majority of the house.)				Featured	Featured	Featured
Tee	Featured	Featured	Featured	Featured	Featured	Featured	Featured	Featured	Featured	Featured	Absent	Featured	Featured	Featured	Featured	Left (Note: Tee voluntarily left the show due to a family emergency.)					Featured	Featured	Featured
Siya	Featured	Featured	Featured	Featured	Featured	Left (Note: Siya voluntarily left the show due to mental health concerns.)																	
Chrisean	Featured	Absent	Featured	Featured	Featured	Left (Note: Chrisean voluntarily left the show to focus on her pregnancy.)																	
Woah Vicky	Featured	Featured	Featured	Featured	Left (Note: Woah Vicky voluntarily left the show after a physical altercation with Janet.)																		
Stunna Girl	Featured	Left (Note: Stunna Girl is not seen after episode 2, after leaving the show before filming wrapped due to issues behind the scenes.)																					
Supporting cast members
DJ Sky	Appeared			Supporting	Supporting	Supporting		Supporting	Supporting		Supporting	Supporting		Supporting	Supporting		Supporting	Supporting	Supporting	Supporting		Supporting	Supporting
Janet				Appeared (Note: Janet and Marsh appear during a physical altercation against Mariahlynn, Tesekhi and Woah Vicky.)	Appeared	Appeared																	
Marsh				Appeared	Appeared	Appeared																	
Cat								Appeared (Note: Cat appears with the Baddies at the clubs in Philadelphia.)	Appeared														

== Reunion ==
The final episode was followed by a three-part reunion special, hosted by John and Nene Leakes, which was released from February 11, 2024 to February 25, 2024. Brown, Chrisean Malone, Sherman, and Waldrip were not present at the reunion taping, after Malone announced she wouldn't be returning to the series. Waldrip did not attend due to her impending legal actions towards Malone and Zeus Network.

At the reunion, Camilla Poindexter, Kissen, and Mayham all left the reunion after their physical altercations. DJ Sky High Baby appeared at the reunion.

Baddies S4 Reunion Seating Arrangement
Viewer's Left							HOSTS		Viewer's Right							
Smiley	Scarface	~~Rollie~~	Sky	Scotty	Mariahlynn	Natalie	Nene Leakes	Janeisha John	Sapphire	Sukihana	Tesehki	Biggie	Ahna	~~Camilla~~	~~Tee~~	DJ Sky

== After filming ==
- Natalie, Scotlynd, Rollie, Mariahlynn, Sapphire, Biggie, Tesehki & Ahna Mac returned for the fifth season of Baddies Caribbean with Sukihana & Scarface making guest appearances.
- Natalie, Scotlynd, Mariahlynn, Sapphire, Biggie, Tesehki, & Ahna Mac were judges for the Baddies Caribbean Auditions.
- Natalie, Scotlynd, Rollie, Ahna Mac, Mariahlynn, Tesehki, Biggie, Sky, Sukihana, Sapphire, Siya & DJ Sky High Baby all made guest appearances on Bad vs. Wild.
- Camilla appeared on the second season of House of Villains.
- Natalie, Scotlynd, and Rollie appeared on Aunt Tea Podcast.
- Natalie, Scotlynd, Rollie, Biggie, Mariahlynn, Ahna Mac, Tesehki and Sapphire were judges for the Baddies Midwest & Gone Wild Auditions.
- Natalie, Scotlynd, Rollie, Biggie, Ahna Mac and Tesehki returned for the sixth season of Baddies Midwest with Chrisean making a special guest appearance.
- Tee had a recurring role in Beauty in Black on Netflix.
- Natalie, Scotlynd, Rollie, Biggie, Ahna Mac and Sapphire were judges for the Baddies Africa Auditions.
- Natalie, Scotlynd, Rollie, Ahna Mac and Stunna Girl returned for the seventh season of Baddies Africa while Biggie is on timeout.
- Tesehki, Chrisean, Rollie and Sky appeared as guests on The Jason Lee Show.
- Natalie, Scotlynd, Rollie, Camilla, Tesekhi, Chrisean, Sukihana, Ahna Mac, Mariahlynn, Smiley, Sapphire, Biggie and DJ Sky High Baby returned for the eighth season of Baddies USA with Marsh making a guest appearance.
- Natalie, Rollie, Mariahlynn, Tesekhi, Scarface, Biggie and DJ Sky High Baby returned for the ninth season of Baddies USA Chapter Two with Camilla making a guest appearance.
- Natalie, Scotlynd, Rollie, Biggie, Tesekhi, Sapphire, Scarface, Smiley, and DJ Sky High Baby returned for the iconic tenth season of Baddies USA Chapter Three.

== Controversy ==
On August 14, 2023, multiple internet sources reported that Victoria Waldrip, better known online as Woah Vicky, was allegedly pressing charges on fellow cast member, Chrisean Malone for second-degree assault. According to sources close to Waldrip's team, Waldrip was under a clause that did not allow any physical contact to take place while filming for the network. Later that day, Waldrip uploaded a twenty-four minute video to her YouTube entitled "YES! I SNITCHED!"

In the video, Waldrip implied that she was set up by Malone into getting jumped by unnamed cast members. She also stated that Malone threw an object at her.

Castmate "Smiley" proceeded to reveal secrets, some lies and some true, about Zeus employees, managers and fellow cast members, causing a lot of controversy.

== Episodes ==
Baddies season 4 episodes
No. overall	No. in season	Title	Original release date
-	SP101	"Auditions: Part 1"	June 18, 2023
-	SP102	"Auditions: Part 2"	June 25, 2023
"It's time for the contestants to face the main stage judges to show who is a real Baddie."
46	1	"Bad in D.C."	September 17, 2023
"The Baddies arrive on the East Coast and it’s immediately clear that not everyone is welcome."
47	2	"No Promo"	September 24, 2023
"After a failed brunch, Natalie turns the promo shoot all the way up as well."
48	3	"Meet Me Outside"	October 1, 2023
"The Baddies stepped out for their first night in D.C. but not everyone was a fan"
49	4	"Greener Grass"	October 8, 2023
"Tesehki decides to address her issues one-on-one."
50	5	"We Gon' Eat"	October 15, 2023
"After Tesehki gets her lick back, a few of the other ladies feel the need to settle some issues."
51	6	"On to the Next"	October 22, 2023
"The Baddies prepare to make their way to Philly."
52	7	"Go-Kart Road Rage"	October 29, 2023
"The Baddies hope to enjoy a day out in Philly."
53	8	"Someone Came with Baggage"	November 5, 2023
"Once a previous season Baddie returns, the house immediately descends into chaos."
54	9	"Baddies and A Hot Boy"	November 12, 2023
"The Baddies take the night by storm and turn up with Bobby Shmurda!"
55	10	"The Chain Gang"	November 19, 2023
"Suki and Sapphire, aka The Coochie Girls, show up intent on settling some festering beefs."
56	11	"Time to Bite the Apple"	November 26, 2023
"After a heated ending to their Philly excursion, the Baddies head to NYC with more beef to settle."
57	12	"National Forgiveness Day"	December 3, 2023
"The Baddies unite to forgive but all things are definitely not forgotten."
58	13	"Eviction Day"	December 10, 2023
"Rollie has decided it's time for people to go."
59	14	"Time for a Swim"	December 17, 2023
"Natalie calls all the Baddies together for a good ole pool party."
60	15	"Harlem Nights"	December 24, 2023
"The Baddies celebrate their success and enjoy an epic dinner in Harlem."
61	16	"Jamaica Me Crazy"	January 7, 2024
"After the Baddies arrive in Jamaica, Smiley experiences a medical emergency."
62	17	"Hangry Friends"	January 14, 2024
"An otherwise friendly dinner in Jamaica quickly goes left."
63	18	"You Gotta Handle Her"	January 21, 2024
"Sapphire and Suki are on the outs after Suki's fight with Rollie and Scarface."
64	19	"Up Shitz Creek"	January 28, 2024
"Sapphire, Suki, and Mariahlynn clash during a Jamaican raft tour."
65	20	"One Love"	February 4, 2024
"The Baddies unite at the Marley estate for a farewell toast."
66	21	"Reunion: Part 1"	February 11, 2024
"Hosted by the queen of reality television Nene Leakes, along with Janeisha John, the Baddies gather all together for the first time since their East Coast and Jamaican excursions."
67	22	"Reunion: Part 2"	February 18, 2024
"After an explosive start to the reunion, things go up even more."
68	23	"Reunion: Part 3"	February 25, 2024
"As the reunion comes to an end, the Baddies depart with unresolved issues and thoughts of who will return for the next season."

== Notes ==
This was the final season to feature Chrisean Rock and Stunna Girl as cast members. Chrisean Rock appeared as a 'Special Guest' two seasons later on "Baddies Mid-west" to have a sitdown talk with previous castmate/sister 'Tesehki' to hopefully resolve past issues, which ended in tears and arguing.

Stunna Girl appeared as a 'Special Guest' three seasons later on "Baddies Africa" to have a sitdown talk with previous castmate 'Ahna Mac' to hopefully resolve past issues, which immediately turns physical, ending in multiple fights and injuries.
