= Saucy Santana =

American rapper (born 1993)

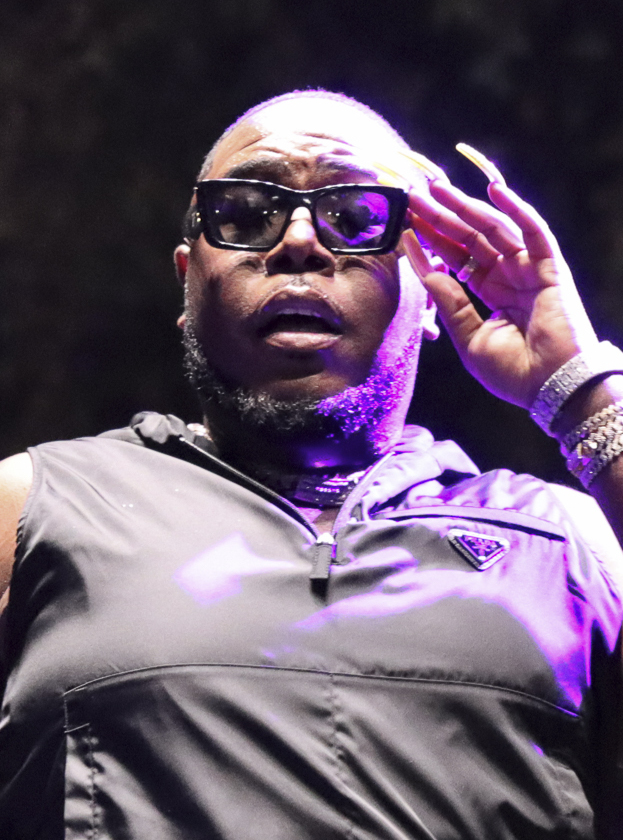
- Saucy Santana in 2022

Background information
- Born: Rashad Jamiyl Spain; October 8, 1993 (age 33); Bridgeport, Connecticut, U.S.
- Origin: Perry, Florida, U.S.
- Genres: Southern hip-hop; pop rap
- Occupations: Rapper; songwriter
- Years active: 2019–present
- Labels: Arena Music; RCA; Streamcut
- Website: saucy-santana.com

Rashad Jamiyl Spain (born October 8, 1993), known professionally as Saucy Santana, is an American rapper. He began his career as a makeup artist for the hip hop duo City Girls, and soon after embarked on a recording career in February 2019 with his debut single "Walk Em Like a Dog". Meanwhile, he became a recurring guest on the reality television franchise Love & Hip Hop: Miami. In 2021, Santana gained further prominence when his singles "Walk" and "Here We Go" spawned viral challenges on TikTok. That same year, he released the song "Material Girl", and later released the song's remix "Material Gworrllllllll!" with Madonna.

== Early life ==
Santana was born in Bridgeport, Connecticut on October 8, 1993. He grew up in Bridgeport, Connecticut, before moving to Florida when he was 10 years old. Santana is of Afro-Dominican descent through his grandmother. He started his career in the music industry by working as a makeup artist for City Girls, and started rapping in February 2019 when he created a theme song for the podcast that he hosted with his friends at the time.

== Career ==
Santana uploaded his debut single "Walk 'Em Like a Dog" to the audio distribution platform SoundCloud in August 2019. This release was followed by his debut EP, Dog Walkers, in September 2019, and then the mixtape Imma Celebrity in January 2020. Santana featured as a recurring guest on the third season of the reality television franchise Love & Hip Hop: Miami, which aired on VH1 from January 6, 2020, to April 6, 2020.

In July 2020, Santana released his second mixtape Pretty Little Gangsta, bolstered by the singles "Up & Down" featuring American rapper Latto, and "Back It Up" featuring American rapper LightSkinKeisha. Santana featured on American rapper Sukihana's single "Food Stamp Hoe" in August 2021. His 2020 single "Walk" went viral in 2021 after being used for the popular TikTok #WalkChallenge, and earned him a cosign from rapper Nicki Minaj.

In 2021, his singles "Here We Go" and "Material Girl" gained prominence on the platform. Material Girl received a cosign from Madonna, who performed a medley of both her song "Material Girl" and Santana's "Material Girl" with him at NYC Pride in 2022. They later released the version they performed as a single, entitled "Material Gworrllllllll!" His debut studio album Keep It Playa was released on December 16, 2021, and featured the single "Shisha", his first collaboration with City Girls, with whom he originally began his career as a makeup artist.

In August 2022, Santana made his debut on The Tonight Show, performing "Booty". Santana also performed "Booty" at the 2022 MTV Video Music Awards "Pre-Show".

In January 2024, Santana joined the cast of the reality television show, Love & Hip Hop: Atlanta during the second half of the eleventh season, in a supporting role. He was promoted to the main cast for the twelfth season.

He coined the term "quiet on the creek" in a 2024 livestream. A repost of a clip went viral on social media in 2026, and Santana released the single "Quiet on the Creek" in July 2026.

== Artistry ==
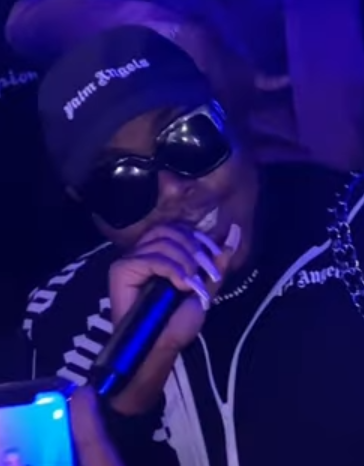
Santana in 2021

Santana has cited Gucci Mane, Trina, and Tampa Tony as influences.

== Personal life ==
Santana came out as gay at age 17.

On December 11, 2019, Santana and two others were shot in a drive-by shooting in Miami. Santana, who was hospitalized for his injuries, stated that he believes the shooting was motivated by homophobia. He said of the shooting, "I got shot in the top of my shoulder, you was aiming at my face or at my head, that's an instant kill." This incident inspired him to write the song "You Can't Kill Me".

== Filmography ==
Year	Title	Role	Notes
2020	Love & Hip Hop: Miami	Himself	5 episodes
2022	The Tonight Show Starring Jimmy Fallon	Himself	Guest; performer
2022	MTV Push	Himself	Guest
2023	Good Morning America	Himself	Guest
2023	Lil Nas X: Long Live Montero	Himself	Guest
2023	Celebrity Squares	Himself	1 episode
2024	Love & Hip Hop: Atlanta	Himself	Main
2024	BET Awards	Himself	Presenter
2024	Bad vs. Wild	Himself	Guest; performer
2024	College Hill: Celebrity Edition	Himself	8 episodes
2024	Baddies Caribbean	Himself	Reunion host
2025	Baddies Africa Auditions	Himself	Judge
2025	Baddies Midwest	Himself	Reunion host
2025	Baddies Africa	Himself	Reunion host
2026	Baddies USA	Himself	Reunion host

== Selected discography ==
=== Studio albums ===
Title	Details
Keep It Playa	Released: December 16, 2021; Format: Digital download, streaming; Label: Arena Music Productions
Haute Sauce	Released September 24, 2025; Format: Digital download, streaming; Label: Arena Music Productions

=== Mixtapes ===
Title	Details
Imma Celebrity	Released: January 14, 2020; Format: Digital download, streaming; Label: Arena Music Productions
Pretty Little Gangsta	Released: July 29, 2020; Format: Digital download, streaming; Label: Arena Music Productions
It's a Vibe	Released: December 17, 2020; Format: Digital download, streaming; Label: Arena Music Productions
Outside	Released: August 5, 2021; Format: Digital download, streaming; Label: Arena Music Productions

=== Extended plays ===
Title	Details
Dog Walkers	Released: July 6, 2019; Format: Digital download, streaming; Label: Arena Music Productions

=== Singles ===
==== As lead artist ====
Title	Year	Peak chart positions		Album
Title	Year	US R&B/HH	UK Down.	Album
"Walk Em Like a Dog"	2019	—	—	Imma Celebrity
"Material Girl"	2019	—	—	Imma Celebrity
"You Can't Kill Me"	2019	—	—	Imma Celebrity
"Up & Down" (featuring Latto)	2020	—	—	Pretty Little Gangsta
"Back It Up" (featuring LightSkinKeisha)	2020	—	—	Pretty Little Gangsta
"Walk"	2020	—	—	It's a Vibe
"Here We Go"	2021	—	—	Outside
"Boom"	2021	—	—	Outside
"B4 (Remix)" (with Kidd Kenn)	2021	—	—	Celebrating Pride: Kidd Kenn
"Rent Due!"	2021	—	—	Non-album single
"Get TF Out My Face"	2021	—	—	Keep It Playa
"Shisha" (with City Girls)	2021	—	—	Keep It Playa
"Hello" (with Tay Money)	2022	—	—	Non-album singles
"Put Your Hands on My" (with R3hab)	2022	—	—	Non-album singles
"Booty" (featuring Latto)	2022	—	—	Non-album singles
"Material Gworrllllllll!" (with Madonna)	2022	—	69	Non-album singles
"Bop Bop"	2022	—	—	Non-album singles
"1-800-Bad-Bxtch"	2023	—	—	Non-album singles
"Whole Family" (featuring Flo Milli)	2023	—	—	Non-album singles
"Meet Me in da Skreets"	2023	—	—	Non-album singles
"Walk It Like I Talk It"	2023	—	—	Non-album singles
"Standin' on Bidness"	2024	—	—	Non-album singles
"Bizerk"	2024	—	—	Non-album singles
"Shoot Up Da Club"	2024	—	—	Non-album singles
"Bounce"	2025	—	—	Non-album singles
"Westside Party" (with The Bam)	2025	—	—	Non-album singles
"Quiet on the Creek"	2026	40	—	Non-album singles

==== As featured artist ====
Title	Year	Album
"Food Stamp Hoe" (Sukihana featuring Saucy Santana and Dontaye Williams)	2021	Non-album singles
"Bossy" (RealXman featuring Saucy Santana)	2022	Non-album singles
"Pinot Noir" (IDK featuring Jucee Froot and Saucy Santana)	2023	Non-album singles
"Broke" (Khadijah featuring Saucy Santana)	2023	Non-album singles

== Awards and nominations ==
=== Results ===
Year	Award	Nomination	Work	Result	Ref.
2022	MTV Europe Music Awards	Best Push	Himself	Nominated	
2022	People's Choice Awards	The New Artist of 2022	Himself	Nominated	
2023	MTV Video Music Awards	Push Performance of the Year	"Booty"	Nominated	
2025	Pride Awards	Best Music Video	"Bounce"	Nominated	
