= Baddies (TV series) =

2021 American reality television

- Genre: Reality television
- Created by: Natalie Nunn
- Inspired by: Bad Girls Club
- Theme music composer: Matt Cash (seasons 1–6) Natalie Nunn (seasons 7–10)
- Country of origin: United States
- Original language: English
- No. of seasons: 10
- No. of episodes: 189 (list of episodes)

Production
- Executive producers: Lemuel Plummer; Jason L. Tolbert; Tanisha Thomas; Darryl Farmer; LJ Plummer; Ray J; Princess Love; Mark Sheibal; Natalie Nunn; Tommie Lee
- Production locations: Atlanta (season 1); South (season 2); West (season 3); East (season 4); Caribbean (season 5); Midwest (season 6); Africa (season 7); US (seasons 8–10)
- Camera setup: Multiple
- Running time: 40–54 minutes

Original release
- Network: Zeus Network
- Release: May 16, 2021 – present

Related
- The Conversation; Bad Boys; Bad Girls Club

Baddies is an American reality television series that premiered on May 16, 2021, on the Zeus Network. A spiritual successor to the former Oxygen series Bad Girls Club, the show documents groups of women living together, and, in later seasons, touring and hosting promotional events and concerts at nightclubs. The show is most well known for the women's interactions, often involving verbal and physical altercations, and frequently criticised for the encouragement of these altercations. Culturally, the show is considered a Black reality television series.

The concept was derived from an ill-fated unofficial Bad Girls Club reunion on OnlyFans created by previous cast members and a subsequent two-part special of The Conversation that aired on Zeus in December 2020. Many Baddies cast members were previously featured on Bad Girls Club, including creator and executive producer Natalie Nunn.

In 2025, the series spawned a spin-off called Baddies Gone Wild featuring an entirely new cast of women each season, a format more authentically reminiscent to Bad Girls Club.

== Development ==
In October 2020, former Bad Girls Club cast members Natalie Nunn and Tanisha Thomas announced plans for an unofficial reunion series, with other fan favorite previous cast members set to feature alongside them. Shortly after the announcement, Nunn and Thomas publicly disagreed over the reunion's production, with Nunn opposing a return to the original network, Oxygen. The reunion was initially developed for release on the online platform OnlyFans.

In December 2020, former members Jada Cacchilli, Sarah Oliver, Christina Salgado, Raquel "Rocky" Santiago and Shannon Sarich who were involved in the initial OnlyFans project appeared together on a two-part special of The Conversation with Nunn to confront their issues surrounding it's production. Shortly after, it was announced that the Baddies series was picked up and in production. Nunn later said that she pitched the concept to Zeus and that the special was used to gauge audience interest in a new series. In February 2021, Zeus Network released a teaser trailer for the new series, Baddies ATL, with the show's premise being the reunion of several former Bad Girls Club cast members as they live together in a mansion in Atlanta.

== Broadcast ==
Baddies is distributed through the Zeus Network subscription streaming service, with new episodes generally released weekly on Sundays. The platform also releases audition specials and reunion episodes alongside the main seasons.

== Reception ==
The series takes its name from the slang term "baddie", referring to a woman who is perceived as attractive and self-assured, particuarly on social media. Natalie Nunn's practice of awarding "Baddies chains" to selected cast members she felt had 'earned their spot on the show' became a recurring feature of the series and, at times, a source of disagreement. Writing for EBONY in 2025, Kia Turner described Baddies as part of the evolution of Black reality television, highlighting its emphasis on conflict, social media visibility and subscription-based streaming. Turner also identified the idea of "earning a Baddies chain" as a cultural reference that had spread beyond the programme.

The franchise has also expanded into live tours, concerts and club appearances providing cast members with opportunities to promote their careers beyond the series. In 2024, Natalie Nunn featured on John Mackk's song Pose For Me, with heavy reference to 'Baddies'. Her segment later became a viral sound on TikTok. The show has also featured cast members philanthropically giving back to initiatives concerning global issues facing Black individuals, such as poverty whilst visiting Kenya during Baddies Africa.

However, the show has also frequently been criticised for reinforcing negative stereotypes towards Black women due to the majority of the show's plot being centred around the women’s unfiltered verbal and physical altercations of which are usually encouraged, and for including some non-Black cast members perceived to be appropriating Black culture. Writing for ESSENCE Girls United in 2024, Kenyatta Victoria criticised the show's rushed editing and lack of character development, arguing that cast members were largely portrayed through their conflicts. In a 2026 episode of NPR's It's Been a Minute, Africana studies scholar Donnetrice C. Allison raised concerns that participants could struggle to pursue other entertainment careers after becoming associated with confrontational reality television.

Concerns have also been raised in regards to the shows morals, ethics and safety, as cast members are often not appropriately penalized for violence or use of weapons such as tasers and mace. The shooting of a security guard at an event for the Baddies USA: Chapter Three tour intensified questions towards the show and the real-world consequences of the culture that develops around turning conflict and violence into content. Although it's spiritual predecessor Bad Girls Club also focused on verbal and physical conflict, for which it also received heavy criticism, the show enforced much stricter policies on violence.

== Series ==
Season	Episodes	Originally released	
Season	Episodes	First released	Last released
1	12	May 16, 2021	August 22, 2021
2	17	June 12, 2022	October 9, 2022
3	16	January 22, 2023	May 21, 2023
4	23	September 17, 2023	February 25, 2024
5	23	May 5, 2024	October 20, 2024
6	26	November 3, 2024	April 27, 2025
7	25	May 11, 2025	November 2, 2025
8	22	November 23, 2025	April 26, 2026
9	22	May 17, 2026	October 25, 2026
10	TBD	November 8, 2026	TBD, 2027

=== Season 1 (2021) ===
The first season, Baddies ATL, featured Seven Craft, Judi Jai, Sarah Oliver, Christina Salgado, Janelle Shanks, Sidney Starr, and executive producers Natalie Nunn and Tanisha Thomas as main cast members. The cast lived together in a mansion in Atlanta during filming. Mehgan James also made guest appearances during the season. Baddies ATL only consisted of ten main episodes, as the season halted production early due to production conflict amongst the former 'Bad Girls' and less popularity than initially anticipated. This was followed by a two-part reunion, in which the cast revisited conflicts that had arisen during and after filming.

=== Season 2 (2022) ===
The second season, Baddies South, featured returning cast member Natalie Nunn alongside a largely new cast. The new cast members included Elliadria "Persuasian" Griffin, Jelaminah Lanier, Chrisean "Rock" Malone, Gia "Rollie" Mayham, Sashanna "Slim" McLaurin, Anne Moore, Scotlynd Ryan and Briana "Bri" Walker. Starr served in a recurring capacity, whilst Oliver and Shanks made guest appearances during the season.

Baddies South became a breakout success for the franchise, helping bring Baddies to a wider and more mainstream audience. During an October 2022 interview with Nunn, No Jumper described Baddies South as Zeus Network's number-one programme at the time. This season retained the series' raw, confrontational style but introduced a travelling format, unlike the first season, with the cast visiting different cities across the south of the US. Chrisean "Rock" Malone was a series regular whose highly publicized relationship with rapper Blueface and legal issues attracted media attention during the season's run.

=== Season 3 (2023) ===
Prior to the third-season premiere, a three-part special titled Baddies West Auditions aired on Zeus, featuring pre-screen judges Lanier, Mayham, Ryan and Walker; main stage judges Nunn, Tommie Lee and Sukihana; and Janeisha John. The third season, Baddies West, featured Nunn, Malone, Mayham and Ryan as the only returning series regulars from the previous season. In addition to the returning cast, Damerlin "Biggie" Baez, Stunna Girl, Tommie Lee, Lo London, Cleo "DJ Sky High Baby" Rahman, Monique "Razor" Samuels and Catya Washington were featured as main cast members.

=== Season 4 (2023–2024) ===
By May 2023, Zeus had announced the fourth season, Baddies East. Auditions for the Baddies East Auditions special were held in McLean, Virginia, near Washington, DC. The two-part special began airing on June 18, 2023, and featured pre-screen judges Baez, Jordan, Mayham, Ryan, and Washington; main stage judges Nunn, Rubi Rose, and Tokyo Toni; and host Janeisha John, joined by special guests Malone and Angela White. In early August 2023, the official cast of the fourth season was announced.

Baddies East premiered on September 17, 2023, with Nunn, Malone, Mayham, and Ryan reprising their roles as series regulars. Baez later returned as a replacement cast member, while Stunna Girl and Rahman returned as supporting cast. Although Stunna Girl returned, she later said she left early on in the season because filming conflicted with her music performance schedule. In addition to the returning cast, JaKeita "Sky" Days, Tamera "Tee" Kissen, Victoria "Woah Vicky" Waldrip, Siya, Krystal "Smiley" Borrego, Anyssa "Ahna Mac" Santiago, Latifa "Tesehki" Malone, Camilla Poindexter, and Mariahlynn Araujo were featured as initial cast members.

=== Season 5 (2024) ===
On December 31, 2023, Zeus announced the upcoming fifth season titled Baddies Caribbean. The Baddies Caribbean Auditions special was held in Miami, Florida, featuring pre-screen judges Araujo, Baez, Kendra "Sapphire" Blaze, Latifa "Tesehki" Malone, Ryan and Santiago; main-stage judges Nunn, Shenseea and Spice; and special guest Nene Leakes. On March 14, 2024, Zeus announced the official cast of the fifth season, excluding the audition selections. Nunn, Araujo, Baez, Blaze, Latifa "Tesehki" Malone, Sukihana, and Ryan were announced as returning series regulars from the previous season, while Jelaminah "Jela" Lanier was set to return as a series regular for the first time since Baddies South.

Cast member Mayham initially announced that she would not return for the fifth season while recovering from a medical procedure. However, according to the official Zeus announcement, Mayham and Santiago were listed as "injured reserve" cast members, and both appeared during the season. In addition to the returning cast, Bianca Bonnie, Johnece "Kaliwae" Miller and Dayjia "Meatball" Blackwell joined the season alongside Big Gretch, Slim2bad, It's Dia, Tinkaabellaaa, and Diamond the Body. Atasha "Tommie" Jefferson returned for a special appearance following her time on Baddies West, alongside singer Aubrey O'Day and influencers Shannon and Shannade Clermont. In addition to the main cast, the season featured replacement candidates Bigg Keva, NuNu, Jelly Bean, J.O., Heaven Marina and Wendollie; Scarface also made a guest appearance.

Despite being announced as a returning cast member for Baddies Caribbean, Sukihana appeared only in the season premiere. Rapper Asian Doll was also announced as a cast member for the season. Ahead of the season's premiere, Zeus released a teaser followed by an official trailer for Baddies Caribbean.

=== Season 6 (2024–2025) ===
On July 16, 2024, Zeus Network announced auditions for Baddies Midwest and Baddies Gone Wild, scheduled to take place on July 27 in Detroit. The auditions were co-hosted by Tiffany Pollard, with Rollie, Scotty, Jela, Ahna, Biggie, Mariah, Tesehki, Sapphire, Tinkaabellaaa, and Meatball serving as pre-screen judges, Natalie Nunn, DreamDoll and Kash Doll as main-stage judges, and Asian Doll as a guest judge.

In September 2024, the cast for Baddies Midwest was announced, with Natalie, Rollie, Scotty, Jela, Ahna, Biggie, Tesehki, Tinkaabellaaa and Diamond returning as cast members, while Jaidyn Alexis and Akbar V were announced as new celebrity cast members. Chrisean Rock, Tommie Lee, and Slim also made appearances during the season. Slim had previously been a series regular on Baddies South. Zeus released the official trailer for Baddies Midwest on October 27, 2024, ahead of the season's premiere on November 3.

=== Season 7 (2025) ===
In January 2025, the seventh season of Baddies, titled Baddies Africa, was announced. Auditions for the season were also announced for January 31, 2025, in Atlanta. On March 27, 2025, the cast for Baddies Africa was announced, with Natalie, Rollie, Scotty, Ahna Mac, Diamond the Body, Ivori, Big Lex, Summer, Badd Dolly and Pretty P returning as cast members.

Tinkaabellaaa did not return for the season due to her pregnancy, while Biggie was placed on a “baddie timeout” and was not included in the announced cast. Amber Rose and Marissa Da’Nae were announced as celebrity guests alongside Tommie Lee and Stunna Girl, a former cast member of Baddies West. Zeus released the official trailer for Baddies Africa on May 4, 2025, ahead of the season's premiere on May 11.

=== Season 8 (2025–2026) ===
On October 11, 2025, the cast for the eighth season, titled Baddies USA: Chapter One, was announced. The season featured returning cast members from previous seasons including, Tommie Lee, Chrisean Rock, Sukihana and Biggie. The season also featured former Bad Girls Club cast members, beginning with a reunion in Washington D.C, before following the cast on performances across the US. Zeus released an official teaser on November 9, 2025, ahead of the season's premiere on November 23.

=== Season 9 (2026) ===
The ninth season, titled Baddies USA: Chapter Two, premiered on May 17, 2026. It featured returning cast members alongside participants from other Zeus series, including Baddies Gone Wild and Joseline's Cabaret. The season followed the cast during performances and appearances in cities including Los Angeles, Phoenix, Las Vegas and Dallas. Its 18-episode main run concluded on September 13, followed by a four-part reunion hosted by Janeisha John and Saucy Santana, which ended on October 25.

=== Season 10 (2026–2027) ===
On September 24, 2026, the cast of the tenth season, titled Baddies USA: Chapter Three, was announced, with Natalie Nunn, Rollie, Scotty, Biggie and Tesehki among the returning cast members. Filming was underway by October, with the production also featuring live cast appearances, including a concert at The Warfield in San Francisco on October 2. Zeus subsequently released an official teaser for the season. In reference to the show's tenth anniversary, Nunn coined it the 'diamond season'.

== Cast ==
= Cast member features in this series as part of the main cast
= Cast member features in this series as recurring
= Cast member features in this series as a guest, judge or contestant

Name	Seasons									
Name	ATL	South	West	East	Caribbean	Midwest	Africa	USA Chapter One	USA Chapter Two	USA Chapter Three
Natalie Nunn	Main									
Christina Salgado	Main	Recurring								Main
Janelle Shanks	Main	Guest						Main		
Sarah Oliver	Main	Guest						Recurring		
Judith “Judi” Jackson	Main							Recurring		
Seven Craft	Main							Recurring		
Tanisha Thomas	Main							Recurring		
Sidney Starr	Main	Recurring		Guest		Guest				
Gia “Rollie Pollie” Mayham		Main								
Scotlynd “Scotty” Ryan		Main							Guest	Main
Elliadria "Persuasian" Griffin		Main						Recurring	Main	
Chrisean "Rock" Malone		Main				Guest		Main		
Jelaminah "Jela" Lanier		Main	Judge		Main		Judge	Main		
Briana "Bri" Walker		Main	Judge					Recurring		
Sashanna "Slim" McLaurin		Main			Contestant	Recurring				
Anne Moore		Main								
Damerlin "Biggie" Baez			Main				Judge	Main		
Atasha "Tommie Lee" Jefferson			Main		Recurring	Guest		Main		
Cleo "DJ Sky High Baby" Rahman			Main	Recurring	Guest			Main		
Suzanne “Stunna Girl” Brown			Main	Recurring			Recurring		Recurring	
Catya "Cat" Washington			Main	Guest				Recurring		
Loren "Lo London" Jordan			Main	Judge				Recurring		
Monique "Razor" Samuels			Main							
Latifa "Tesehki" Malone				Main				Main		
Etheria "Scarface" Ruffin			Contestant	Main	Recurring				Main	
Kendra "Sapphire" Lewis				Main		Judge		Main		Main
Destiny "Sukihana" Henderson			Judge	Main	Recurring			Main		Main
Krystal "Smiley" Borrego				Main				Main	Guest	Main
Anyssa "Ahna Mac" Santiago				Main						Recurring
Mariahlynn Araujo				Main		Judge		Main		
Camilla Poindexter				Main				Recurring		
JaKeita "Sky" Days				Main	Guest					
Tamera "Tee" Kissen				Main						
Victoria “Woah Vicky” Waldrip				Main						
Michele "Siya" Sherman				Main						
Tatyana "Tinkaabellaaa" Williams					Main		Guest	Main		
Johnece "Kaliwae" Miller					Main					Main
Sydonie "Diamond the Body" Person					Main			Recurring	Main	
Shameika "NuNu" Brailsford					Main			Main		
Gretchen "Big Gretch" Cotto					Main			Main		
Dayjia "Meatball" Blackwell					Main	Judge				
Misharron "Asian Doll" Allen					Main	Judge				
Lajerrika "J.O." Welch				Contestant	Main					
Bianca "Bianca Bonnie" Dupree					Main					
Tyrrion "Slim2bad" Turner					Main					
Fredia "Its Dia" Major					Main					
Keva "Bigg Keva" Donaldson					Main					
JeLisa "Jelly Bean" Morris					Main					
Aneshia "Badd Dolly" Sibley					Contestant	Main				
Summer "Summer None Other" Thomas						Main				
Alexis "Big Lex, Not Da Lil One" Radcliff						Main				
Ivori Minor						Main			Main	
Paula "Pretty P" McEwen						Main				Main
Jaidyn Alexis						Main				Main
Valerie "Akbar V" Raven						Main				
Jazmin Re'Nae Miller						Main				
Raven "Yoshi Banks" Mitchell						Main				
Emma Alayo						Main				
Jeffania "Fania" Cherry							Main			
Javen "Kold Killa" Starghill							Main			
Octavia "Tavii Babii" Poulos							Main			
Kamae "Kay Rixan" Bunch							Main	Recurring	Main	
Elsie "K" Kandawasvika							Main			
Briana "Russian Kream" Bass							Main			
Abidemi “Choco Brown” Bolanle							Main			
Amber Rose Levonchuck							Main			
Latina Rose							Main			
Ariel "DJ Ari" Thomas				Contestant				Main		
Johnell "Ciroc Galore" Hickman								Recurring	Main	
Tierrinie “Tee-Tee” Favors						Contestant			Main	
Shamisha “Pressure” Adams							Contestant		Main	
Kaniyah “Miss Kaniyah” Whipple									Main	
Amber “Amber Ali” Ward					Contestant		Contestant		Main	
Latasha “Wet-Wet” Smith					Contestant				Main	
Alexus “Lexi Gold” Dorsey					Contestant				Main	
Ivy “Oxy Pirl” Oakley						Contestant			Main	
Sharon “Shay” Carr						Contestant			Main	
Daze "Daisy Dukes" Smith								Guest	Main	
Bahati Hassani									Main	
Dru Emery “Hurricane Em” Smith									Main	
Shaniqua “ShowGirl Neek” Hood									Main	
Jeanette “Egypt” Moore									Main	
Erica “Envy Erica” Scott									Main	
Cleaira "Melanie Fox" Yarber						Recurring				Main
Antrivia “Mz. Treve” Smith									Recurring	Main
Lori The Biggest									Guest	Main
Erika “Lucci Vee” Jordan										Main
Akira "Nevaeh" Williams										Main
Lauren Michelle Kinsey									Guest	Main
Lauren “Baby Tyson”									Guest	Main
Carla “Dava” Lawson									Guest	Main
Chelsea “Marie Minksss” Walker									Guest	Main
Aliyah “Becky London”									Guest	Main
Alana Dorsey									Guest	Main
Imani "Kashmere" Robertson-Gwin										Main
Supporting cast members
Mehgan James	Recurring									
Marchinee "Marsh" Lewis			Contestant	Recurring				Recurring		
Janet "Jay" Guzman				Recurring						
Aubrey O'Day					Recurring					
Shannon Clermont					Recurring					
Shannade Clermont					Recurring					
Wendy “Wendollie” Cabrera					Recurring					
Heaven "Heaven Marina" De Leon			Contestant		Recurring					
Marissa Da'Nae Rogers							Recurring			
Yaritza “DJ Blue Diamond” Attias									Recurring	
Victoria “Bro Rilla” Woods									Recurring	
Shantae “Pretty Dolly” Santiago									Recurring	
