= Sky Days =

American television personality

- Born: JaKeita Days; September 19, 1983 (age 42); Harlem, New York City, U.S.
- Other name: Fly Tatted Sky
- Occupations: Television personality; businesswoman
- Years active: 2013–present
- Television: Black Ink Crew; Baddies
- Children: 2

JaKeita Days (born September 19, 1983), known professionally as Sky Days or Fly Tatted Sky, is an American television personality and businesswoman best known for appearing on the VH1 reality television series Black Ink Crew.

== Career ==
Days first became known as a cast member on VH1's reality television series Black Ink Crew (also credited as Black Ink Crew: New York), appearing across multiple seasons as a receptionist and on-screen personality associated with the Harlem tattoo shop featured on the program.

In March 2017, Days began appearing as a panelist on VH1's Hip Hop Squares. In October 2017, Days competed on VH1's celebrity competition series Scared Famous, which featured reality stars undertaking horror-themed challenges. In October 2018, Days opened her own clothing boutique Her Little Secret in Miami, Florida, which was accompanied by a grand opening event. The business shuttered in 2019 after Days allegedly failed to pay rent twice. In 2020, Days announced she launched her own production company, Days Media, and was developing a Netflix docuseries, Trolling.

In 2023, Days joined the cast of the Zeus Network reality series Baddies (season 4, marketed as Baddies East) alongside other established television personalities. In 2025, Days hosted Crashout, a Punk'd-inspired series on NowThatsTV.

== Personal life ==
Days is from Harlem, New York City and has two sons, Genesis and Dessalines.

Days got involved in a credit card fraud scheme in Arizona around 2005; she was found guilty, given a one-year jail sentence, and put on probation that required her to stay in Arizona. In defiance of that probation, she later relocated to Atlanta, Georgia. In May 2014, two U.S. Marshals arrested and returned her to Arizona; she reportedly served about two months for the parole violation despite facing a possible longer sentence. Days addressed the incident in June 2016, saying:

"10 years ago I got caught committing credit card fraud in Arizona and I was sentenced to one year. After I did my year in jail I was put on probation and I went on the run for a few years. While I was in Atlanta recently, two U.S. Marshals knocked on my door and came and got my pretty ass."

In October 2019, Days announced that she began dating American rapper 600Breezy as they both attended BET Hip Hop Awards together. In January 2020, 600Breezy announced that they broke up.

== Filmography ==
=== Television ===
Year	Title	Role	Notes
2013–2020	Black Ink Crew	Herself	Guest (season 1); Main cast (seasons 2-8)
2017	Brunch with Tiffany	Herself	Guest
2017	Scared Famous	Herself	8 episodes; celebrity horror competition
2017–2018	Hip Hop Squares	Herself	Panelist/contestant (5 episodes)
2018–2019	Wild 'N Out	Herself	2 episodes
2023–2024	Baddies	Herself	Main cast (season 4); Guest (season 5)
2024	Bad vs. Wild	Herself	Guest
2025	CrashOut	Herself	Host
