= Saviii 3rd =

American rapper (born c. 1996)

- Born: Tyrus Washington c. 1996 (age 29–30)
- Origin: Long Beach, California, US
- Genres: Hip hop, trap
- Instrument: Vocals
- Label: Cash Money West

Tyrus Washington (born c. 1996), known by his stage name Saviii 3rd, is an American rapper from Long Beach, California.

== Early life ==
Washington was born c. 1996. His parents were divorced. His mother often played Carl Thomas, Musiq Soulchild and R. Kelly. His father often hosted barbuecues, playing Snoop Dogg. He got into hip hop after hearing Dr. Dre's 2001. He downloaded the instrumental to "Still D.R.E." from the internet and wrote to it. He attended Long Beach Polytechnic High School.

== Career ==
In 2019, Wack 100 and Birdman signed Washington to Cash Money West, the West Coast division of Cash Money Records—their first signee. His second album with them, Snowboy 2, contained features from Mozzy, Jacquees, Birdman and O.T. Genasis.

In 2022, Washington was arrested after stealing US$3,000 worth of recording equipment. He gave police the fake name Johnnie Lee Brown. Codeine cough syrup was found from a search. He was booked in Burbank jail. The fake name was discovered when he was fingerprinted. They also found an active probation warrant.

In 2023, after being released from prison, he released the 15-song album 3 Against the World, which contained one feature from Ray Vaughn.

== Discography ==
- Against All Opps (2024)
- 3 Against the World (2023)
- Let Me Be Clear (2023)
- SNOWBOY 3 (2021)
- Snowboy 2 (2019)
- All Eyez On 3 (2019)
- Snowboy (2019)
