= Deuces (film) =

2017 film directed by Jamal Hill

- Film release poster
- Directed by: Jamal Hill
- Written by: Jamal Hill; Curtis Bryant
- Produced by: Otis Best; Justin Moritt; Ron Robinson
- Starring: Larenz Tate; Meagan Good; Lance Gross; Siya
- Production companies: Flavor Unit Entertainment; BET
- Distributed by: Netflix
- Release date: April 1, 2017
- Running time: 87 minutes
- Country: United States
- Language: English

Deuces is an American crime drama written and directed by Jamal Hill. The film stars Larenz Tate, Meagan Good, Lance Gross and Siya. The film is executive produced by Queen Latifah for her production company Flavor Unit Entertainment. Deuces premiered on Netflix on April 1, 2017.

== Synopsis ==
Detective Jason Foster goes undercover to take down a crime ring that has been impenetrable by the police department for years. However, Foster finds himself drawn in by the unique persona of ringleader Stephen "Deuces" Brooks and the dual life that he leads. The mission is further complicated when Foster's sister Janet also falls under Deuce's spell.

== Cast ==
- Larenz Tate as Stephen “Deuces” Brooks
- Meagan Good as Janet Foster
- Lance Gross as Jason Foster
- Siya as Diggs
- Antonique Smith as Tanya
- La La Anthony as Detective Sonya Diaz
- Rick Gonzalez as "Papers"
- Rotimi as "Face"
- Andra Fuller as Detective Solomon Garret

== See also ==
- List of hood films
