= Mr. Take Ya Bitch =

2023 single by Lil Mabu and Chrisean Rock

Single by Lil Mabu and Chrisean Rock

from the album Young Genius
- Released: October 17, 2023
- Length: 1:48
- Label: Young Genius Academy Inc. / Empire
- Songwriters: Matthew DeLuca; Chrisean Malone
- Producers: Lil Mav; NAT08; BS Beats; Mxrcy

Lil Mabu singles chronology
| "At What Cost?" (2023) | "Mr. Take Ya Bitch" (2023) | "Teach Me How To Drill" (2023) |

Chrisean Rock singles chronology
| "Pain" (2023) | "Mr. Take Ya Bitch" (2023) | "N.A.L.B." (2023) |

Music video
- "Mr. Take Ya Bitch" on YouTube

"Mr. Take Ya Bitch" (stylized as "MR. TAKE YA B*TCH") is a song by American rappers Lil Mabu and Chrisean Rock, released on October 17, 2023, alongside a music video. It is the seventh single from Lil Mabu's second mixtape, Young Genius (2024). It is a diss track aimed at rapper Blueface and his manager Wack 100.

== Background and content ==
Chrisean Rock dated Blueface from 2020 to 2023. The hook finds Lil Mabu boasting about "taking" her from Blueface. Rock additionally brags about her apparent new relationship with Mabu and takes shots at Blueface. In his verse, Mabu disses Wack 100 chiefly for his association with rapper 6ix9ine.

== Chart performance ==
The song quickly charted in Billboard's Hot R&B/Hip-Hop Songs and TikTok Billboard Top 50 charts, respectively peaking at number 33 and at number one by November 2, 2023. It debuted at number 96 on the Billboard Hot 100, becoming Chrisean Rock's first song to reach the chart.

== Charts ==
Chart performance for "Mr. Take Ya Bitch"
| Chart (2023) | Peak position |
|---|---|
| Canada (Canadian Hot 100) | 72 |
| New Zealand Hot Singles (RMNZ) | 13 |
| UK Singles (OCC) | 99 |
| US Billboard Hot 100 | 96 |
| US Hot R&B/Hip-Hop Songs (Billboard) | 24 |
