= Wack 100 =

American music manager and record executive (born 1977)

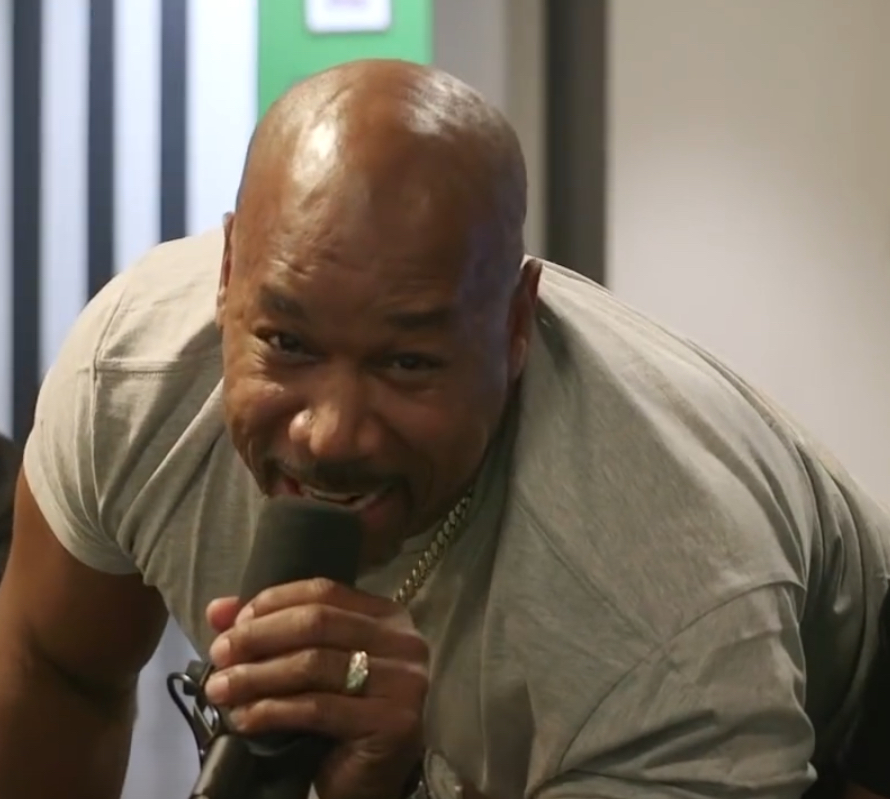
- Jones in 2020

Background information
- Born: Cash McElroy Jones; April 7, 1977 (age 49); Los Angeles, California, U.S.
- Genre: West Coast hip-hop
- Occupations: Talent manager; record executive

Cash McElroy Jones (born April 7, 1977), known professionally as Wack 100, is an American music manager and record executive. He co-founded the record label 100 Entertainment in 2021, as well as Cash Money Records' subdivision Cash Money West in 2018. He was also associated with Prolific Records, Blood Money Entertainment, and Death Row Records, and served as talent manager for rappers the Game, Blueface and 6ix9ine.

== Early life and career ==
Jones was born on April 7, 1977, in Pacoima, Los Angeles. He attended the University of Houston. He was formerly married to a woman named Kimberly, with who he had two children. He later dated a woman named Rekeita. As of 2024, he has an estimated net worth of US$5,000,000.

In 2018, Jones and Birdman launched Cash Money West, a division of Cash Money Records for the West Coast of the United States. They were given a budget of $20,000,000 from Universal Music Group—Cash Money's parent company. Saviii 3rd was their first signee. Ronald "Slim" Williams, Birdman's brother, was named vice president of the division.

In 2021, Jones became 6ix9ine's manager, and helped renegotiate his contracts and release new music. After 6ix9ine was assaulted in an LA Fitness bathroom, Jones wished him a speedy recovery. Opposingly, Boosie Badazz started a fundraiser for his attacker. While 6ix9ine was struggling financially, Jones confirmed it, saying he sent him $20 for gas.

== Legal history ==
In 2019, The Game was found guilty of sexually assaulting Priscilla Rainey, a contestant on She's Got Game. Rainey was awarded $7,000,000 in damages, plus the royalties to his album Born 2 Rap. Jones claimed that he owned all the royalties to the album, and that he didn't owe her anything.

In 2021, Ken Lawson sued Jones for assault, claiming he knocked out him and his wife, causing his jaw to be wired.

In 2022, Jones claimed he had a second, "more graphic" sex tape of Kim Kardashian and Ray J. Kim threatened a lawsuit if the alleged footage was released.

In June 2024, Jones offered to post bail for Duane "Keffe D" Davis, who was awaiting trial for the 1996 murder of Tupac Shakur. The proposal was denied by Clark County District Court Judge Carli Kierny, who stated that she suspected Jones and Davis were attempting to profit from Davis' story. Under Nevada law, it is illegal for convicted killers to profit from their crime.

In March 2025, Jones was mentioned six times under the moniker "Wack 100" in the federal RICO case of the United States vs. Eugene "Big U" Henley Jr. and other parties, according to documents released by the United States Attorney's Office, Central District of California. Henley claimed Jones was an informant to the FBI, which he denied.

== Personal feuds ==
In October 2019, after the death of Nipsey Hussle, Jones made statements saying the artist was not a legend and received fans more so posthumously. Later, in December, Nipsey's former bodyguard J Roc attacked Jones backstage during a Rolling Loud concert.

On June 15, 2023, Gucci Mane and Lil Baby released the song "Bluffin", where Gucci Mane dissed Jones in the line: "I ain't arguin' on no internet, I'm not Wack 100".

On October 17, 2023, Lil Mabu and Chrisean Rock released "Mr. Take Ya Bitch", a diss tracked aimed at both Blueface and Jones.
