= Lil RT =

American rapper (born 2014)

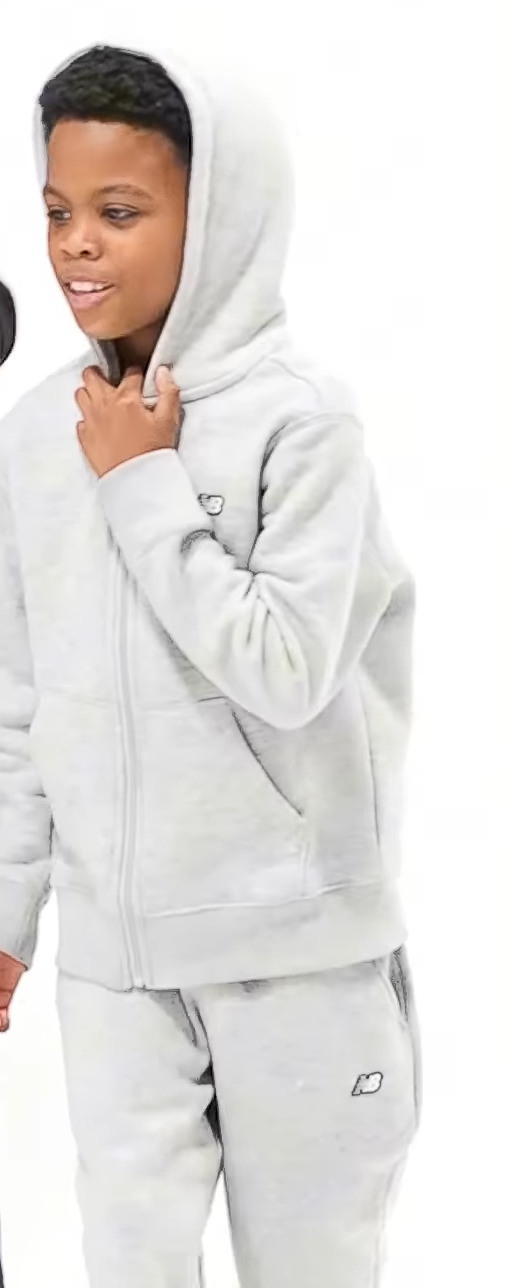
- Lil RT in 2024

Background information
- Born: June 3, 2014 (age 11); Atlanta, Georgia, US
- Genres: Hip hop; drill; gangsta rap
- Occupations: Rapper; songwriter
- Instrument: Rapping
- Years active: 2023–present

Robert Thompson (born June 3, 2014), known professionally as Lil RT, is an American rapper. He gained attention after his song "60 Miles" went viral on YouTube. He and his parents have been criticized for the mature themes and explicit content that are seen in his music.

== Early life ==
Robert Thompson was born on June 3, 2014 in the West Atlanta neighborhood of Bankhead. He lives with his mother Danotta Thomas. He has an older brother who goes by his rap name, PCF Lil Kari.

== Career ==
Lil RT's debut single, "60 Miles," was released in October 2023 with Batmaan Jay. The song quickly went viral on YouTube, amassing over 4 million views within a few months. The track features themes of street life and urban struggles. Critics have noted the song's explicit lyrics and mature themes, which have sparked both praise and controversy by prominent commentators. He released a sequel, titled "60 Miles 2," in October 2023 and followed up with "60 Miles 3" featuring Doe Boy.

In November 2023, Lil RT appeared on a livestream with Twitch streamer Kai Cenat. During the stream, Lil RT performed a freestyle rap in which he appeared to use the word "rape," rapping "And I got her number, and I'm finna rape her." Cenat then took off his belt as if he was about to discipline him. Both Lil RT and Cenat were criticized for this. Cenat later attempted to clarify the situation by asking Lil RT if he had said "rate" instead, after which Lil RT claimed he did.

In February 2024, Lil RT performed at a party in Miami's Little River neighborhood. The performance included provocative elements, such as dancers twerking on him and an OnlyFans model dressed in a thong. Conservative commentators criticized the performance. Candace Owens called it as an example of "sinister, evil people trying to invade our souls with filth." Owens had previously claimed his lyrics "speak to the corrosion of our culture." West Atlanta rapper Lil Tony defended Lil RT on a podcast, saying "He's been like this. I can't even say it's his fault. This is just where he comes from."

In March 2024, Lil RT released a single titled "BIG DOG SH*T" with New York rapper Lil Mabu.

In June 2024, a video from his 10th birthday party went viral on social media. The footage depicted adult women dancing and twerking on Lil RT. Some users called for legal action against his parents.
