= Mathematical Disrespect =

2023 single by Lil Mabu

Single by Lil Mabu

from the album Young Genius
- Released: May 5, 2023
- Genre: Drill, Brooklyn drill
- Length: 1:28
- Songwriter: Matthew DeLuca
- Producer: Hemz

Lil Mabu singles chronology
"Trip to the Hood" (2023)	"Mathematical Disrespect" (2023)	"Rich Scholar" (2023)

Music video
- "Mathematical Disrespect" on YouTube

"Mathematical Disrespect" (stylized in all caps) is a song by American rapper Lil Mabu, released on May 5, 2023, as the fourth single from his second mixtape, Young Genius (2024). It is considered his breakout single, having gained attention on the video-sharing platform TikTok, and is his first charting song, peaking at number 47 on the Billboard Hot 100.

== Background ==
Self-released on May 4, 2023, the song was used in nearly 80,000 clips on TikTok, which has been instrumental in its rise to popularity. According to Luminate, it amassed 7.2 million official streams in the United States in the May 5–11 tracking week.

== Composition ==
The songs main composition consists of trap based beats and electronic synths/ a drum machine.

In the song, Lil Mabu mentions being an independent artist and raps about how he lies in his songs, which he addresses to the NYPD. At one point, he references the web-based game Wordle. The track closes with him singing, "I invested money in myself and it paid / I can't take a break 'til Mabu is a household name".

== Music video ==
The song's official music video was released on May 18, 2023. It was directed by JordieDotCom and co-directed by Mabu himself. It shows Mabu rapping in various settings, including an office and in front of a police station. As of May 2024, it has received over 12 million views.

== Charts ==
Chart performance for "Mathematical Disrespect"
Chart (2023)	Peak position
Australia (ARIA)	21
Australia Hip Hop/R&B (ARIA)	6
Canada (Canadian Hot 100)	21
Global 200 (Billboard)	78
Ireland (IRMA)	26
Lithuania (AGATA)	83
Netherlands (Single Top 100)	78
New Zealand (Recorded Music NZ)	23
UK Singles (OCC)	27
UK Indie (OCC)	3
UK Hip Hop/R&B (OCC)	11
US Billboard Hot 100	47
US Hot R&B/Hip-Hop Songs (Billboard)	13
