= Sisterhood of Hip Hop =

- Genre: Reality
- Starring: Brianna Perry; Diamond; Siya; Bia; Nyemiah Supreme; Chloe Riley; Lee Mazin; Audra the Rapper
- Country of origin: United States
- Original language: English
- No. of seasons: 3
- No. of episodes: 26

Production
- Executive producer: T.I.
- Production company: 51 Minds Entertainment

Original release
- Network: Oxygen
- Release: August 12, 2014 – September 13, 2016

Sisterhood of Hip Hop is an American reality television series on Oxygen starring five female rappers who "navigate their way through the male-dominated music industry". The show is executive produced by rapper T.I. and premiered on August 12, 2014.

== Cast ==
=== Main ===
==== Brianna Perry ====
Brianna Perry is a former Missy Elliott protégée who has been active in the music industry since the age of 5. She was formerly signed to Elliott's label The Goldmind Inc. alongside Trina's Diva Enterprises. Perry would go on to gain viral exposure in 2012 for her single "Marilyn Monroe", which was featured on Beyoncé's official website.

==== Siya ====
Michele Sherman, better known as her stage name Siya, is an openly gay rapper, who became infamously known for feuding with Kreayshawn associate V-Nasty.

==== Diamond ====
Brittany Nicole Carpentero, better known by her stage name Diamond, is best known for being one-sixth of the rap group Crime Mob.

==== Bia (seasons 1–2) ====
Bianca Treal, best known as Bia Landrau or simply Bia, is infamously known for her song "High" and her remixes, alongside her working relationship with Grammy Award-winning artist Pharrell. She is currently signed to his label i Am Other.

==== Nyemiah Supreme (seasons 1–2) ====
Nyemiah Streeter, best known as Nyemiah Supreme, is an American female rapper who is best known for her 2013 debut single "Rock & Roll", featuring mentor Timbaland. She has also danced backup for numerous r&b acts. In 2015 she released "No Questions featuring K-Camp.

==== Chloe Riley (season 2) ====
Chloe Riley is a San Diego-raised native who has garnered a record deal with Slip-N-Slide, former home to fellow female rapper Trina.

==== Lee Mazin (season 3) ====
Real Name: Taliyah Smith

==== Audra the Rapper (season 3) ====
Real Name & Birthdate: Audra Green on October 4, 1989

== Cast timeline ==
Main cast (appears in opening credits)
Secondary cast (appears in green screen confessional segments and in end credits alongside the main cast)
Guest cast (appears in a guest role or cameo)

Main cast members
Cast member	Seasons		
Cast member	1	2	3
Brianna Perry	Starring		
Siya (Note: Credited onscreen as "Michelle Sherman".)	Starring		
Diamond (Note: Credited onscreen as "Brittany Nicole Carpentero".)	Starring		
Bia (Note: Credited onscreen as "Bianca Treal".)	Starring		
Nyemiah Supreme (Note: Credited onscreen as "Nyemiah Streeter".)	Starring		
Chloe Riley		Starring	
Lee Mazin			Starring
Audra The Rapper (Note: Credited onscreen as "Audra Green".)			Starring

=== Guest appearances ===
- Trina — Fellow platinum-selling female rapper and Brianna Perry's former mentor
- Eve — Grammy Award-winning female rapper, fashion designer and actress
- Soulja Boy — Rapper and Diamond's ex-boyfriend
- Irv Gotti — Record producer and label owner of The Inc. Records, which established multi-platinum recording artists: Ashanti, Ja Rule and Lloyd
- Timbaland — Multi-platinum producer and musician and childhood friend of Missy Elliott
- Tank — R&B singer-songwriter and Siya's manager
- Tristan "Mack" Wilds — Actor and musician
- Travie McCoy — Rapper and member of Gym Class Heroes
- Rico Love — R&B singer-songwriter
- Ja Rule — Multi-platinum recording artist and actor
- Pharrell Williams — Grammy Award-winning artist from the production duo The Neptunes and rap trio N*E*R*D
- Rick Ross — Platinum-selling rapper and Brianna Perry's former collaborator
- Fat Joe — Grammy Award-winning rapper & CEO of Terror Squad Entertainment, a label responsible for introducing female rapper Remy Ma
- DJ Khaled — DJ, rapper and label owner of We The Best Music Group
- Lil Jon — Multi-platinum rapper and producer
- Da Brat — Fellow female rapper & Diamond's friend
- T-Pain — Grammy Award-winning singer
- Brooke Valentine — Girl Fight
- Adrienne Bailon — Host of The Real, Singer, Actress

== Episodes ==
=== Series overview ===
Season	Episodes	Originally released	
Season	Episodes	First released	Last released
1	8	August 12, 2014	September 30, 2014
2	8	June 9, 2015	July 28, 2015
3	10	July 12, 2016	September 13, 2016

=== Season 1 (2014) ===
No. overall	No. in season	Title	Original release date	US viewers (millions)
1	1	"Femme-C's"	August 12, 2014	N/A
2	2	"Rap Battles"	August 19, 2014	N/A
3	3	"Love or Hip Hop"	August 26, 2014	N/A
4	4	"Mo' Managers, Mo' Problems"	September 2, 2014	N/A
5	5	"Miami Vices"	September 9, 2014	N/A
6	6	"Image"	September 16, 2014	N/A
7	7	"Momma Drama"	September 23, 2014	N/A
8	8	"Bringing Down the House"	September 30, 2014	N/A

=== Season 2 (2015) ===
No. overall	No. in season	Title	Original release date	US viewers (millions)
9	1	"California Love"	June 9, 2015	0.24
10	2	"Fantastic Voyage"	June 16, 2015	0.24
11	3	"It's all About the Benjamins"	June 23, 2015	0.38
12	4	"Run This Town"	June 30, 2015	0.22
13	5	"Berzerk"	July 7, 2015	0.28
14	6	"Aftermath"	July 14, 2015	0.25
15	7	"Tha Crossroads"	July 21, 2015	0.28
16	8	"U-n-i-t-y"	July 28, 2015	0.25

=== Season 3 (2016) ===
No. overall	No. in season	Title	Original release date	US viewers (millions)
17	1	"Beats, Rhymes, and Life"	July 12, 2016	0.16
18	2	"Can't Nobody Hold Me Down"	July 19, 2016	0.19
19	3	"Start From Scratch"	July 26, 2016	0.21
20	4	"Show Up & Show Out"	August 2, 2016	0.20
21	5	"Check Yo Self"	August 9, 2016	0.17
22	6	"None of Your Business"	August 16, 2016	0.17
23	7	"Papa'z Song"	August 23, 2016	0.14
24	8	"Gotta Have It"	August 30, 2016	0.15
25	9	"Hustler Musik"	September 6, 2016	0.16
26	10	"If I Ruled the World"	September 13, 2016	0.20

== Broadcast ==
The series debuted in the United States on Oxygen on August 12, 2014. The second season premiered on June 9, 2015.

Internationally, the series premiered in Australia on September 24, 2015 on Channel [V].
