= Lil Mabu =

American rapper (born 2005)

- Born: Matthew Peter DeLuca; April 4, 2005 (age 21)
- Genres: Hip-hop; Brooklyn drill
- Occupations: Rapper; songwriter
- Years active: 2018–present

Matthew Peter DeLuca (born April 4, 2005), known professionally as Lil Mabu, is an American rapper from Manhattan, New York City. He first gained some recognition in 2020 for his song "Miss Me", earned further recognition with the 2022 song "No Snitching", and became best known for his 2023 single "Mathematical Disrespect", which entered the top 50 of the Billboard Hot 100.

== Career ==
DeLuca began his rap career in 2018. He gained traction with the release of his song "Miss Me" in 2020. In 2022, his song "No Snitching" a collaboration with Dusty Locane, became increasingly popular on the social media app TikTok. DeLuca's debut mixtape, Double M's, was released on June 30, 2022, which featured guest appearances from Dusty Locane, Sha EK, Dougie B, DThang and Rah Swish.

On December 23, 2022, he released a song titled "Throw" featuring New York drill rapper DD Osama, which was the number one trending music video on YouTube for a week at the time of its release.

In May 2023, DeLuca released the song "Mathematical Disrespect". It charted in the US, UK and Ireland, becoming his first entry on any worldwide major music chart. A month later, he graduated from high school and released another single, titled "Rich Scholar". On August 22, 2023, he announced that he was going to college and on September 1, released the single "At What Cost?" accompanied by a music video.

On October 17, 2023, DeLuca and rapper Chrisean Rock released "Mr. Take Ya Bitch", a diss track aimed at Blueface and his manager Wack 100. It quickly charted on both Billboard's Hot R&B/Hip-Hop Songs and Hot 100 chart, peaking at numbers 33 and 96 respectively. Additionally, it charted on the TikTok Billboard Top 50, peaking at number one by November 2, 2023. Rock and DeLuca feuded with Blueface over social media.

On December 21, 2023, DeLuca and rapper Fivio Foreign released "Teach Me How to Drill", accompanied by a music video.

In April 2024, DeLuca almost injured himself when a gun he was holding discharged while he was filming a music video.

== Personal life ==
In 2022, it was revealed by the New York Post that DeLuca was a model student at the prestigious Collegiate School, a $60,000 tuition prep school in Manhattan, and that his family owned properties totaling $12 million. Some commentators have noted the contrast between DeLuca's upper-class socioeconomic background, and the subject matter of DeLuca's drill music.

DeLuca is currently a business student at Emory University, and records music in his dorm room. DeLuca describes himself as being in "school by day, being in the streets at night time".

Additionally, DeLuca was dating adult actress Bonnie Blue in March 2025.

== Discography ==
=== Mixtapes ===
List of mixtapes, with selected details
Title	Mixtape details
Double M's	Released: June 30, 2022; Label: Self-released; Format: Digital download, streaming
Young Genius	Released: April 5, 2024; Label: Young Genius Academy; Format: CD, digital download, streaming

=== Singles ===
==== As lead artist ====
List of charted singles, with selected chart positions
Title	Year	Peak chart positions									Album
Title	Year	US	US R&B/HH	US Rap	AUS	CAN	IRE	NZ	UK	WW	Album
"Man Down"	2019	—	—	—	—	—	—	—	—	—	Non-album singles
"Slide" (with R3ady)	2020	—	—	—	—	—	—	—	—	—	Non-album singles
"Heartbreaking"	2020	—	—	—	—	—	—	—	—	—	Non-album singles
"Miss Me"	2020	—	—	—	—	—	—	—	—	—	Non-album singles
"Move It"	2021	—	—	—	—	—	—	—	—	—	Non-album singles
"Demon Time"	2021	—	—	—	—	—	—	—	—	—	Non-album singles
"King of the World" (Note: A remix to the song featuring Dusty Locane is also included on Double M'S.)	2021	—	—	—	—	—	—	—	—	—	Double M's
"I'm Done"	2022	—	—	—	—	—	—	—	—	—	Non-album singles
"Wicked Witch"	2022	—	—	—	—	—	—	—	—	—	Non-album singles
"Throw" (with DD Osama)	2022	—	—	—	—	—	—	—	—	—	Young Genius
"On the Radar Freestyle"	2023	—	—	—	—	—	—	—	—	—	Young Genius
"Trip to the Hood"	2023	—	—	—	—	—	—	—	—	—	Young Genius
"Mathematical Disrespect"	2023	47	13	7	21	21	26	23	27	78	Young Genius
"Rich Scholar"	2023	—	—	—	—	—	—	— (Note: "Rich Scholar" did not enter the NZ Top 40 Singles Chart, but peaked at number 25 on the NZ Hot Singles Chart.)	—	—	Young Genius
"At What Cost?"	2023	—	—	—	—	—	—	—	—	—	Young Genius
"Mr. Take Ya Bitch" (featuring Chrisean Rock)	2023	96	24	—	—	72	—	— (Note: "Mr. Take Ya Bitch" did not enter the NZ Top 40 Singles Chart, but peaked at number 13 on the NZ Hot Singles Chart.)	99	—	Young Genius
"Teach Me How to Drill" (with Fivio Foreign)	2023	—	—	—	—	—	—	—	—	—	Young Genius
"Big Dog Shit" (with Lil RT)	2024	—	—	—	—	—	—	—	—	—	Young Genius
"Engine" (featuring YoungBoy Never Broke Again)	2024	—	—	—	—	—	—	—	—	—	TBA
"Bang! Bang!"	2024	—	—	—	—	—	—	—	—	—	TBA

==== As featured artist ====
List of singles as featured artist
Title	Year	Album
"Shotta Flow 7" (Remix) (NLE Choppa featuring Lil Mabu)	2024	Shotta Flow Series
"Fuck Then Dub Her" (B-Lovee featuring Lil Mabu)	2024	TBA
"Explosive" (DD Osama featuring Lil Mabu)	2024	Before The Album
