= Audra the Rapper =

American rapper and singer (born c.1990)

Audra The Rapper
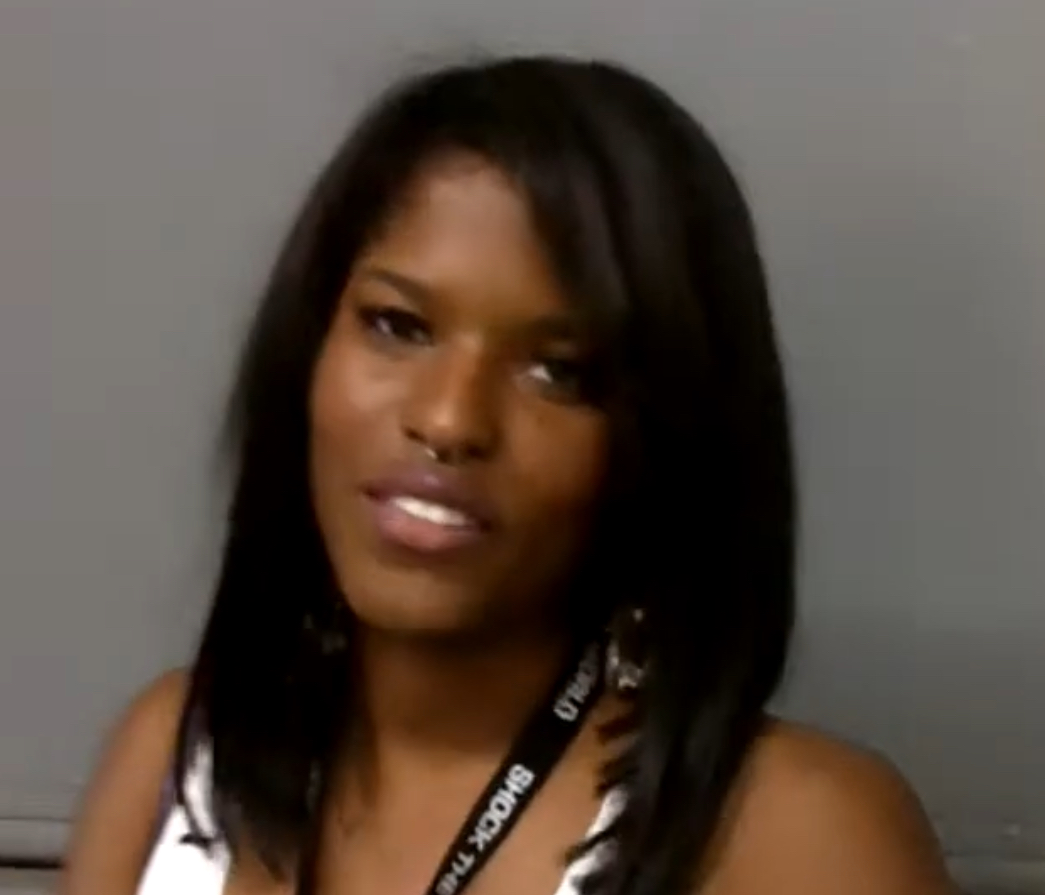
- Audra the Rapper in 2010

Background information
- Born: c. 1990 (age 35–36); Washington, DC
- Genres: Hip hop, RnB
- Occupations: Rapper, singer
- Instrument: Vocals
- Years active: 2005–present
- Website: soulfullyratchet.com

Audra The Rapper is the stage name of Audra M. Green (born c. 1990) is an American rapper, songwriter, and television personality. She is a cast member on the third season of Oxygen Network's hit series 'Sisterhood of Hiphop' executive produced by T.I. Audra started writing music at the age of six years old and recording herself at age thirteen in her mother's closet. She released her first mixtape, Sweet and Sour Vol. I at age 16 and sold it at local malls and car washes. Audra has released 5 studio projects including her most recent, 'Anti Love Songs' which she released under her own label alongside Sony Music's RED Distribution.

== Early years ==
Audra was born in Washington, DC and raised in Richmond, Virginia by her single-mother and grandmother. Audra has said music was a great inspiration to her, especially when it comes to jazz and rhythm and blues. Listening to Anita Baker, Louis Armstrong and Ella Fitzgerald with her grandmother made singing an early priority for her. Audra was raised in the church and joined the choir at age 5 and was leading solos by age 6. Audra says she was 6 years old when she got her first CD, Brandy Norwood's (aka Brandy) self-titled debut album and it fixed her attention on having a music career. Audra has stated that her major musical influences are Lauryn Hill, The Diplomats, Kanye West, and Floetry.

== Music ==
In the summer of 2009, Audra The Rapper and Rick Ross crossed paths when by chance they were both at iPower 92.1 radio station in Audra's hometown of Richmond, Virginia. The two met a second time in October 2010 at a university homecoming concert in Richmond where Audra opened for Ross and her performance led Ross to endorse, mentor, and co-sign her.

Audra The Rapper on numerous occasions has said how Lauryn Hill is her all time inspiration, so much so that Audra's 2010 mixtape, Miseducation of Audra was a tribute to Lauryn.

Unlike a lot of rappers, whose rap style have easily been categorized as Trap, Hardcore or Conscious, Audra The Rapper has partnered her lyrics with a variety of sounds, reflecting various styles and has described her style is "Ratchet Soul".

== Discography ==
=== Songs ===
- 2011 "Love Song Remix" ft Mickey Factz and Raheem DeVaughn
- 2013 "Hit and Run" ft Abir
- 2015 "China.Bus"
- 2016 "Done.Did"
- 2016 "Sometimes"
- 2016 "Bxtchlxss"

=== Mixtapes ===
- 2007 Sweet and Sour
- 2010 Miseducation of Audra
- 2011 No Such Thing Does Exist

=== EPs ===
- 2015 Retrospectrum

=== Albums ===
- 2016 Anti Love Songs

== Videos ==
- 2014 "Nutter Butters"
- 2015 No.Body
- 2016 Sometimes

== Honors and awards ==
Year	Category	Honors and Awards	Notes
2006	HipHop Songwriter of The Year	Song of The Year International Competition (supported by VH1 Foundation)	Winner
2009	Role Model of The Year	Southern Entertainment Awards (S.E.A.s)	Nominated
2009	Community Activist of The Year	Southern Entertainment Awards (S.E.A.s)	Nominated
2010	Breakthrough Female Artist of the Week	WorldStarHipHop.com	April 21, 2010
2010	BET - The Deal	BET Television	Appeared in March 2010, May 2010 and July 2010
2010	Role Model of The Year	Southern Entertainment Awards (S.E.A.s)	Nominated
2011	Virginia - Best Female Rap Artist	DC, Maryland, Virginia (DMV) Awards	Winner
2011	Mixtape of the Year for Miseducation of Audra	Southern Entertainment Awards (S.E.A.s)	Nominated
2011	MTV2 Sucker Free Freestyle Featured Artist	MTV2 Television	MTV2
