= Sukihana =

American television personality and rapper (born 1991)

- Also known as: Suki; Suki with the Good Coochie
- Born: Destiny Lanette Henderson; November 15, 1991 (age 34); Wilmington, Delaware, U.S.
- Genre: Hip-hop
- Occupations: Rapper; television personality
- Years active: 2017–present
- Label: 12th and Collins

Destiny Lanette Henderson (born November 15, 1991), best known by her stage name Sukihana, is an American reality television personality and rapper who rose to prominence as a cast member on the VH1 reality series Love & Hip Hop: Miami in 2020. That same year, she released her debut mixtape, Wolf Pussy. In 2023, she appeared as a cast member on the reality show Baddies.

== Early life and education ==
Henderson was born and raised in Wilmington, Delaware. She spent her formative years at a creative arts school based in Atlanta, Georgia, before moving to Miami, Florida.

== Career ==
Henderson starred on the third season of Love & Hip Hop: Miami (2020). She made a cameo appearance in the music video for the Cardi B single "WAP", released on August 7, 2020.

In September 2020, she released her debut mixtape Wolf Pussy.

In February 2024 while being interviewed by Bobbi Althoff, Henderson appeared to confuse the words "musician" and "magician", becoming annoyed with the interviewer for referring to her as the former. A snippet of the interview that included this apparent misunderstanding went viral with 1.5 million likes.

"I'm not a musician. I make music. I make music. And that's not all I do: I make music, I act; I'm a TV star too. ... I'm not confusing nothing [sic]. You don't know. You thought that all I was is a magician or whatever the fuck you said. ... No, I don't think baby; I don't think. What's that? That's ghetto. I don't think. I know."

— Destiny Lanette Henderson aka "Sukihana", February 2024

== Personal life ==
The rapper’s alias "Sukihana" comes from the Suki Hana Japan chain of restaurants. This is one of the chain’s many locations.

Henderson's stage name "Sukihana" is an allusion to an Asian restaurant in the Christiana Mall, as someone joked she "tasted like Sukihana". She has 4 kids.

=== Feud with Cupcakke ===
In 2020, rapper Cupcakke released a diss track entitled "How to Rob (Remix)", dissing many artists, including Henderson. Henderson released her own diss track titled "Rob Who?" Cupcakke released another diss titled "The Gag Is", and Henderson released her final diss titled "Cupcakke Bummy".

=== YK Osiris controversy ===
In the summer of 2023, rapper YK Osiris stirred controversy online after a clip leaked of him attempting to "playfully" grab Henderson by the neck and mouth and forcefully kiss her, during the taping of a The Crew League basketball game (provided by Revolt, a digital cable network founded by Sean "Diddy" Combs). At the time, Henderson was seated between two other male friends as YK Osiris stood behind her.

Initially, Henderson appeared to be laughing as he held her face, but quickly was pushing him off of her and saying to "stop". After he received backlash for what users assumed was attempted sexual assault, Osiris apologized to Henderson (who later forgave him) and his fans.

=== Arrest and imprisonment ===
On April 24, 2024, Henderson was arrested in North Lauderdale, Florida, on two felony charges of possession of ecstasy with intent to sell, manufacture or deliver and possession of codeine with intent to sell, manufacture or deliver. Henderson responded to the arrest in an Instagram Live post on April 29, 2024, saying, "I don't need to sell no fuckin' drugs, bitch; I'm already rich." Jail records show she was being held in the Broward County Sheriff's Office Paul Rein detention facility in Pompano Beach on a $7,500 bond.

== Discography ==
=== Mixtapes ===
- Wolf Pussy (2020)

=== Singles ===
- "Hood Rat" (featuring Cuban Doll; 2019)
- "All in Your Throat" (2020)
- "Pretty and Ratchet" (2020)
- "You Forgot to Love Me" (2020)
- "No One" (2020)
- "Food Stamp Hoe" (featuring Saucy Santana; 2021)
- "Everywhere" (2021)
- "Grinch" (2022)
- "Eating" (2023)
- "Casamigos (Pour It in My Cup)" (with Afro B; 2023)
- "Selling" (featuring OJ Da Juiceman; 2024)
- "Pilates" (with Vybz Kartel and Jonny Blaze; 2024)
- "Cocaine" (2024)
- "Up On Me" (2025)

=== Appearances ===
- "Drug Dealer" – Cuban Doll (featuring Sukihana; 2018)
- "Smack a Bitch" – Rico Nasty (featuring Rubi Rose, Sukihana, ppcocaine; 2020)
- "Thot Thoughts" – Muni Long (featuring Sukihana; 2021)
- "Born by the River" – Sexyy Red (featuring Sukihana; 2022)
- "Thangin" – Lil Scrappy (with BeatKing and Sukihana; 2022)
- "Bad Gyal Team" – Dovey Magnum (featuring Sukihana; 2022)
- "Princess Treatment" – Khaotic (featuring Sukihana; 2023)
- "Sukisada" – Sada Baby (featuring Sukihana; 2023)
- "Slut Me Out" (remix) – NLE Choppa (featuring Sukihana; 2023)
- "Hood Rats" – Sexyy Red (featuring Sukihana; 2023)
- "On Ya Head" – Atltop20, Princess, Diamond, BeatKing (2023)
- "Throwing Stacks" – Ray J (with Sukihana; 2024)
- "Sukihana" – Juicy J (featuring Sukihana; 2024)
- ”Freak” — Diamond The Body (featuring Sukihana and Shamar Marco; 2025)

== Television ==
Year	Title	Notes
2020–2023	Love & Hip Hop: Miami	(Seasons 3-5A)
2020	Jerry Springer	Guest
2021	Judge Jerry	Guest
2022	Baddies West	Judge; 3 episodes
2023	VH1 Family Reunion: Love & Hip Hop Edition	Season 3
2023-2024	Baddies East	Main Cast (Season 4)
2023-2024	Celebrity Squares	Guest; 2 episodes
2024	Bad vs. Wild	Guest; 2 episodes
2024	Baddies Caribbean	Guest
2025-2026	Baddies USA	Main Cast (Season 8)
