= Woah Vicky =

American influencer (born 2000)

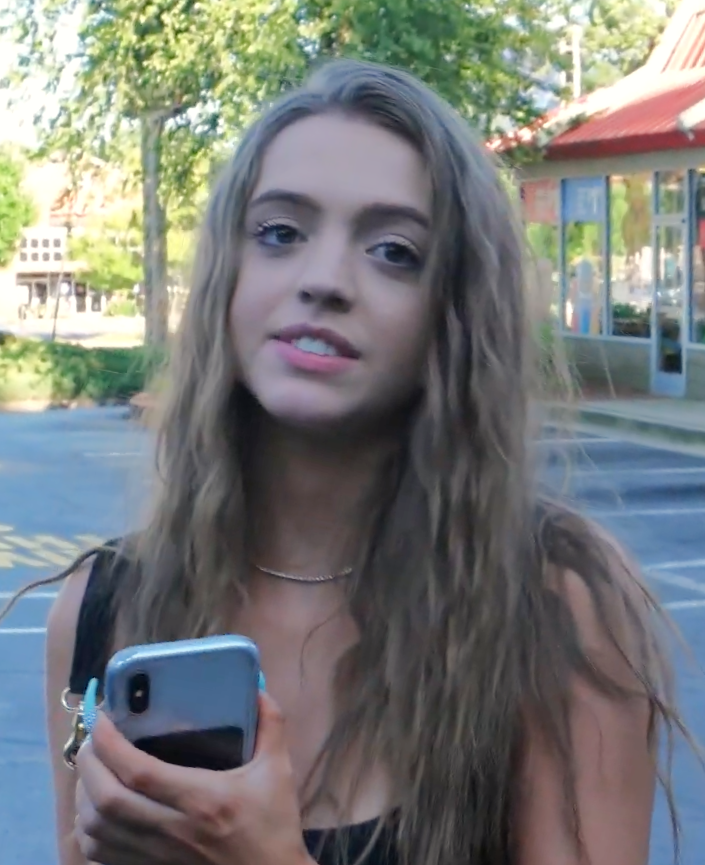
- Waldrip in 2018
- Born: Victoria Rose Waldrip; March 7, 2000 (age 26); Marietta, Georgia, U.S.
- Occupations: Influencer; media personality

Instagram information
- Page: Victoria Rose
- Followers: 3.5 million

YouTube information
- Channel: Woah Vicky
- Years active: 2017–present
- Subscribers: 1.16 million
- Views: 30.5 million
- Last updated: May 19, 2026

Victoria Rose Waldrip (born March 7, 2000), known professionally as Woah Vicky, is an American influencer and media personality. Known for garnering controversy online, she first gained attention on social media starting in 2017 after falsely claiming that she was Black and later became known for her feud with rapper Bhad Bhabie. Her feud with YouTuber RiceGum in 2017, which included a diss track, brought her further prominence on both Instagram and YouTube.

== Early life ==
Victoria Rose Waldrip was born on March 7, 2000 to Steve Waldrip and Carla Johnson in Marietta, Georgia, where she was raised. She has one half-sister on her father's side with a Colombian mother.

== Career ==
Waldrip first began gaining attention online in the summer of 2017 for erroneously claiming in a YouTube video that she was a Black woman, based on her alleged Ancestry.com results variously revealing her to either be 25 or 44 percent Black, despite her being fully white. Her claims led to comparisons between her and Rachel Dolezal. She soon started regularly using the N-word; toting guns in her videos; claiming to be from Atlanta's Zone 6, known for its gang violence; using gang signs of the Bloods; and wearing a durag. Shawn Setaro of Complex likened her behavior to "act[ing] like a caricature of a black woman" and Ben Brasch of The Atlanta Journal-Constitution described it as "mocking numerous elements of black culture". Her feud with YouTuber RiceGum later that year, which culminated in her diss track against him featuring the racial epithet "ching chong" as its hook, brought her to further prominence on both Instagram and YouTube. Waldrip gained more than two million followers on Instagram between the summer of 2017 and the following year.

Waldrip was arrested in February 2018 for refusing to leave the Four Seasons Town Centre in Greensboro, North Carolina during an active shooter warning and kicking a police officer who attempted to arrest her, the video of which she posted on her Instagram account and which quickly spread online. In April 2018, she and Bhad Bhabie got into a verbal altercation which involved fellow influencer Lil Tay and led to a spike in followers for Waldrip. Their feud escalated when a video of a physical fight between them in October 2019 at a recording studio in Atlanta went viral online after being shared by TMZ. Jonah Valdez wrote for the Los Angeles Times that, by 2023, Waldrip was "best known for her beef with rapper Bhad Bhabie".

By 2023, she became known for sharing her Christian and often anti-LGBTQ beliefs. In April 2023, Waldrip alleged on the We in Miami podcast that high school friends of the rapper Lil Nas X, who came out as gay in 2019, had told her that he was not actually gay and was only pretending to be. She also claimed that both he and nonbinary rapper Lil Uzi Vert had "sold their soul[s]". Lil Nas X responded to Waldrip's claims in a tweet, writing, "who gives af what ja rule thinks at a time like this[?]" Also that year, Waldrip was a cast member on Baddies East, the fourth season of the Zeus Network reality television series Baddies. In December 2024, a tweet from her X account alleged that the person writing it had kidnapped her and was holding her for a ransom of $1 million in Nigeria, though she later stated that she had faked it and was "just bored" when she made the tweet, which received backlash on social media. In August 2025, Waldrip announced that she and the company Ultimate AI would be launching an app, Call Vicky, in which fans would be able to speak to an AI-powered clone of her which would use an audio deepfake of her voice and information about her provided to the app.

== Public image ==
In August 2018, Kengo Tsutsumi of Mic wrote that Waldrip had gained a following by playing into the attention economy and that she was monetizing her following through ads for a spam website where one could purportedly win a free iPhone X by providing their personal data. Also that year, Ben Brasch of the Atlanta Journal-Constitution dubbed her an "Instagram troll" who "purposefully or not ... often stirs emotions online". She was referenced on Playboi Carti's verse on Tyler, the Creator's 2019 song "Earfquake".

== Filmography ==
Year	Title	Role	Notes
2023	Baddies	Herself	
