= Chrisean Rock =

American rapper (born 2000)

- Born: Chrisean Eugenia Malone; March 14, 2000 (age 26); West Baltimore, Maryland, U.S.
- Occupations: Rapper; television personality
- Known for: Baddies
- Children: 1
- Musical career
- Genre: hip-hop
- Instrument: Vocals
- Years active: 2020–present

Chrisean Eugenia Malone (born March 14, 2000), known professionally as Chrisean Rock, is an American rapper and reality television personality. She is best known for appearing on Zeus Network's reality series Baddies (2022–2026) for four seasons. She then starred in her own short-lived series, Blueface & Chrisean: Crazy in Love (2022–2023), also for the network.

== Early life ==
Malone was born in West Baltimore to Charla and Eugene Malone. There are 12 siblings in total, with Latifa "Tesehki" Malone being one of her sisters.

Her father was in prison for the majority of her childhood, while her mother struggled with drug addiction. As a result of her mother's battle with drug abuse, she was occasionally homeless.

She briefly attended a community college in Baltimore and appeared on Ultimate Tag, completing the course in 50 seconds and winning the $10,000 grand prize.

== Career ==
Malone halted her studies and began appearing on an OnlyFans show, called Blue Girls Club, by living in rapper Blueface's mansion for a month to showcase herself on his platform. Blueface had 7 million followers on Instagram and offered women the opportunity to make a name for themselves. Due to her popularity on the OnlyFans show, Blueface signed both Chrisean Rock and the other contestant, named Bonnie Lashay, as artists to his label, BluefaceLLC. The show attracted controversy, with some women stating that it was not what they had signed up for. Drinking games, sex toys, matching tattoos, and physical altercations were common parts of the show. Malone lost a front tooth in an altercation at the home.

In 2020, Malone released her debut single, called "Lonely", a collaboration with Blueface. Shortly after, she released her highly popular song, called "Vibe", which has garnered over eight million streams on Spotify. In June 2022, she was cast in the Zeus Network reality show, Baddies and its spin-off, Blueface & Chrisean: Crazy in Love. On October 17, 2023, she collaborated with rapper Lil Mabu on the release of a track, called "Mr. Take Ya Bitch", a diss song aimed at Blueface and his manager Wack 100.

On April 18, 2024, Malone announced she would begin a career as a women's American football player, playing as a running back for the Cali War of the Women's Football Alliance. She played her first game on May 4.

On Sunday, March 30, 2025, Malone performed a gospel single "Yahweh" for the first time. She sang with Tim Bowman Jr. and Arissa at Faith City Central, a church in Brandywine, Maryland.

== Personal life ==
Malone dated Blueface from 2020 until they split in 2023. In January 2023, Malone announced she was pregnant with her first child. She gave birth to a son in September, streaming the birth on Instagram Live. On September 10, she attended a church service at the Spirit of Faith Christian Center in her hometown of Baltimore to have her son blessed, where she announced her son's middle name to be Jesus.

During her pregnancy, she faced heavy criticism and rumors over allegations of actively consuming alcohol and smoking; accusations which are corroborated by pictures and videos taken of her during this time. While interviewing on the The Danza Project podcast, she stated that she "doesn't accept" medical diagnoses and said "God says what God says. I don't have to accept what you [say]. So, it's really me protecting a revelation that I heard from the Lord over my son", implying she is being led by faith rather than alleged diagnoses of mental disabilities. Blueface has repeatedly denied being the biological father but steps in as an active father occasionally. He denies that the developmental delays are from a mental disability, attributing them instead to a lack of parenting, calling Malone herself "the disability".

=== Legal issues ===
On May 7, 2020, Malone was charged with possession of marijuana and drug paraphernalia in Maryland. On July 13, 2021, a bench warrant was issued for Malone for failure to appear in court.

In February 2022, Blueface shared photos of Malone writing "I love Blue" on his wall using her blood. Malone was later arrested in rapper Blueface's stolen G-Wagon in Oklahoma while attempting to drive from California to Baltimore. Malone was charged on February 18, 2022, with two felonies, possession of Controlled Dangerous Substance with intent to distribute and possession of CDS without affixing the appropriate stamp. On March 15, 2023, Malone was sentenced to four years on probation and 120 hours of community service following her guilty plea to the charges, having until September 2023 to complete the necessary community service hours.

On August 22, 2022, Malone was charged in Arizona with disorderly conduct and criminal trespassing in the third degree, the trespassing charge later being dismissed. On September 6, 2022, Malone failed to appear in court.

On August 13, 2023, while filming an episode of Baddies East in Baltimore, Victoria "Woah Vicky" Waldrip alleged that Malone punched and threatened her. Malone was charged with assault in the second degree.

On October 26, 2023, Irby Lashala, Malone's former hairstylist, filed a civil lawsuit against Malone, the Zeus Network, and Chrisean Rock, alleging assault, battery, and intentional infliction of emotional distress. These charges relate to an incident at the Baddies premiere on January 22, 2023, where Malone allegedly punched her in the face. The network was sued for negligence.

On November 10, 2023, Malone was present at a Tamar Braxton concert, allegedly after being invited by the artist. It was later alleged that Malone assaulted a backup singer, James Wright Chanel. On January 23, 2024, Malone was charged with two misdemeanor offenses, assault with a deadly weapon and battery. On January 7, 2024, Wright filed a civil suit against Malone for injuries sustained during the alleged assault.

On February 23, 2024, the Oklahoma District Attorney submitted a request to the courts to accelerate her deferred judgement and have her extradited to Oklahoma to serve 30 days in jail for failure to complete the required community service, following the February 2022 incident. A warrant was granted. Later, on March 5, 2024, live on Instagram, Malone stated that she has no plans to turn herself in over the warrant out for her arrest in Oklahoma, explaining that she "got no time for jail" as she "has a son to raise".

On February 26, 2024, Rama Montakhabi filed a civil suit against Malone and the Zeus Network for intentional bodily injury, property damage, wrongful death (e.g., assault, battery, vandalism), based on an alleged encounter with Malone that took place around June 26, 2023, at the BET Awards after party.

In June 2024, Malone was arrested in Southern California and later extradited to Oklahoma in August 2024. If convicted, she could face up to 8 years in prison.

== Discography ==
=== Singles ===
List of singles as a lead artist, with selected chart positions, showing year released and album name
Title	Year	Peak chart positions	Album
Title	Year	US	Album
"Lonely" (with Blueface)	2020	—	Non-album singles
"Vibe"	2021	—	Non-album singles
"Word to My Brother"	2021	—	Non-album singles
"Rainy Days"	2022	—	Non-album singles
"Lit"	2023	—	Non-album singles
"Time"	2023	—	Non-album singles
"Keep Swimming" (featuring Blueface)	2023	—	Non-album singles
"The Streets"	2023	—	Non-album singles
"Baby Father Drama"	2023	—	Non-album singles
"Mr. Take Ya Bitch" (with Lil Mabu)	2023	96	Young Genius
"N.A.L.B." (with Gloss Up)	2023	—	Non-album singles
"Bow Bow Bow (F My Baby Dad)" (Remix) (with Sexyy Red)	2024	—	Non-album singles

== Filmography ==
Television
Year	Title	Role	Notes	Ref.
2020	Ultimate Tag	Herself	Contestant	
2020	Blue Girls Club	Herself	(season 1)	
2022	South Central Baddies	Herself	Seasons 1 & 2	
2022–2026	Baddies	Herself	Main cast (seasons 2–4, 8); supporting cast (season 6)	
2022–2023	Blueface & Chrisean: Crazy in Love	Herself	Executive producer	
2024	WTF Tommie Sh*t	Herself	Guest	
2023–2025	The Jason Lee Show	Herself	Season 1–3	

== Celebrity Boxing Record ==
1 fight	1 win	0 losses
By knockout	1	0

No.	Result	Record	Opponent	Type	Round, time	Date	Location	Notes
1	Win	1–0	Ku'Shiyah Williams	TKO	2 (4), 0:55	Sep 19, 2026	Hyatt Regency Hotel, Baltimore, Maryland, U.S.	Pro debut
