= The Conversation (TV series) =

American reality television series

- Genre: Reality
- Country of origin: United States
- Original language: English
- No. of seasons: 1
- No. of episodes: 14

Production
- Executive producers: Lemuel Plummer; Ray J; Princess Love
- Running time: 36–52 minutes

Original release
- Network: Zeus Network
- Release: March 15, 2020 – December 19, 2021

The Conversation is a reality television series that premiered on March 15, 2020 on Zeus Network.

== Series synopsis ==
The Conversation captures raw, real and explosive confrontations from notable personalities in the world of business, fame and celebrity, using unfiltered footage, without the intervention of mediators.

== Development ==
The first teaser was released on March 1, 2020 and features Love & Hip Hop: Hollywood stars Ray J and Princess Love. A trailer for the fourth and fifth episodes was released on June 28, 2020 and features Love & Hip Hop: Hollywood stars A1 Bentley and Lyrica Anderson as well as their mothers Pam Bentley and Lyrica Garrett.

Filming of the sixth and seventh episodes occurred on August 30, 2020 when former Love & Hip Hop: Hollywood star Hazel E took to Instagram live following an altercation with co-star Masika Kalysha. On November 8, 2020, a teaser for the eighth and ninth episodes was released and featured former Bad Girls Club cast members: Jada Cacchilli, Natalie Nunn, Sarah Oliver, Christina Rome, Rocky Santiago and Shannon Sarich.

== Episodes ==
| No. | Title | Original release date |
|---|---|---|
| 1 | "Ray J & Princess Part 1" | March 15, 2020 |
| 2 | "Ray J & Princess Part 2" | March 22, 2020 |
| 3 | "Ray J & Princess Part 3" | March 29, 2020 |
| 4 | "A1 & Lyrica Part 1" | July 5, 2020 |
| 5 | "A1 & Lyrica Part 2" | July 12, 2020 |
| 6 | "Masika & Hazel E Part 1" | September 6, 2020 |
| 7 | "Masika & Hazel E Part 2" | September 13, 2020 |
| 8 | "The Bad Girls of Reality TV Part 1" | December 6, 2020 |
| 9 | "The Bad Girls of Reality TV Part 2" | December 13, 2020 |
| 10 | "Tommie Lee & Akbar V" | October 17, 2021 |
| 11 | "Bobby Lytes & Rolling Ray Part 1" | November 7, 2021 |
| 12 | "Bobby Lytes & Rolling Ray Part 2" | November 14, 2021 |
| 13 | "Natalie Nunn & Redd Part 1" | December 12, 2021 |
| 14 | "Natalie Nunn & Redd Part 2" | December 19, 2021 |
