= Siya =

American rapper

- Born: Michele Andrea Sherman; Barstow, California, U.S.
- Origin: Brooklyn, New York, U.S.
- Genre: Hip hop
- Occupations: Rapper; songwriter
- Instrument: Vocals
- Years active: 2011–present
- Labels: Empire, R&B Money
- Website: siyamusic.com

Michele Andrea Sherman, better known by her stage name Siya, is an American rapper. In 2012, she signed with Tank's R&B Money label imprint. She starred in the Oxygen reality TV series Sisterhood of Hip Hop. Siya has collaborated with artists such as Chris Brown, Sage the Gemini and Kirko Bangz. Siya has performed alongside artists such as Wyclef Jean at the world famous B.B. Kings, as well as opened up for Fat Joe and Fabolous during a concert at Nassau Coliseum in Long Island, New York. Currently starring in the BET Plus show Angel.

== Early life ==
Siya was born in Barstow, California to an African American father and a Puerto Rican mother, and has three sisters. Due to her mother's drug abuse and her incarcerated father, Siya was sent to live with her grandmother who raised her in the Eleanor Roosevelt housing projects in Bedford–Stuyvesant, Brooklyn. Siya's childhood influence was the rap group called Bone Thugs-n-Harmony. She states: "What I loved about them was how melodic their music was and that they tried different shit."

== Musical career ==
While some in the industry were afraid of how an openly gay female rapper would fit into the genre, Siya remained determined and refused to compromise her identity and stayed true to her style.

R&B legend Tank soon found her and from there she was signed to Tank's label R&B Money LLC. Siya released her singles "I'm Gone", "Smoke Drink", and mixtape Elevator Dreams in 2011.

Siya released her singles "One Hunnid" and "Real MVP" in 2014. She released a mixtape titled Better Late Than Never, and What Never Happened in 2015. She went on to release her debut studio album SIYAvsSIYA, on December 9, 2016. The album included collaborations with artists such as Ashley Rose, Jake&Papa, Lyric Wright and Kreesha Turner with the debut single being "New York."

On February 6, 2017, Siya released a song titled "Front Door", in promotion for her six song extended play, Commitment. The EP was released on February 10, 2017, under Tank's label imprint, R&B Money LLC. The EP features the single "Don't You (Say Yes)" featuring Tank. In 2017 she released "Houston Girls" ft Kirko Bangz & "Hot Girl" with her EP 383- For Roosevelt. In 2018 she released "No Race" and "Circle Watching" as a preview for her next EP Mad Energy expected to drop fall 2018.

== Discography ==
=== Albums ===
- SIYAvsSIYA (2016)
- 383 – for Roosevelt (2017)
- Mad Energy (2018)

=== Mixtapes ===
- Elevator Music (2011)
- Better Late Than Never (2015)
- What Never Happened (2015)
- Commitment (2017)

== Filmography ==
2023	Film/TV Series	Role	Notes
2014-2016	Sisterhood of Hip Hop	Herself	Main
2016	Deuces	Diggs	
2018	The First Purge	Blaise	
2018	Street Dreams – Los Angeles	Hopper	
2020	No Escape	Sam	
2021	True to the Game 3: The Final Chapter of Gena & Quadir's Story	Fly	
2023	Baddies East	Herself	
2023	Angel	Diamond	TV Series
2024	Bad vs. Wild	Herself	Guest
2024	Station 19	Jazzy	Episode: “True Colors”
2025	On Everything I Love	Forte Gangster	
