= Zeus Network =

Video streaming service

- Website type: OTT streaming platform
- Available in: English
- Headquarters: Burbank, California, {{{location_country}}}
- Country of origin: United States
- Founders: Amanda Cerny; King Bach; DeStorm Power; Lemuel Plummer
- CEO: Lemuel Plummer
- Website: thezeusnetwork.com
- Registration: Required
- Launched: July 13, 2018; 8 years ago
- Current status: Active

Zeus Network (colloquially Zeus) is an American subscription video on-demand over-the-top streaming service. It was founded by social media personalities DeStorm Power, Amanda Cerny, King Bach, and television producer Lemuel Plummer, who serves as president and CEO. The service features original scripted and unscripted influencer- and celebrity-driven programming.

== Content ==
=== Original unscripted content ===
- Bobby I Love You, Purrr (2022)
- Bad Boys (2022–present)
- Baddies (2021–present)
- The Conversation (2020–2021)
- Joseline's Cabaret (2020–2026)
- Tokyo Toni's Finding Love ASAP! (2019)
- The Real Blac Chyna (2019)

=== Original scripted content ===
- Dr. Blackson
- Caught
