= Jonica Booth =

American actress

- Born: St. Louis, Missouri, United States
- Other name: Blu
- Occupations: Actress, reality television star
- Years active: 2013-present
- Television: Rap Sh!t, Bad Girls Club season 12

Jonica Booth, is an American actress and reality star. She is best known for playing the role of Chastity in HBO Max's, Rap Sh!t. She also took part in Oxygen Network's hit reality television series; Bad Girls Club season 12: Chicago.

== Television career ==
Booth, going by the nickname "Blu" starred in the twelfth season of Oxygen Network's hit reality television series Bad Girls Club. During her time on the show she was involved in a love triangle with fellow cast members Aysia Garza and Raesha Clanton. She guest appeared in the finale episode of the fourteenth season of the show alongside fellow season 12 cast member Loren Jordan. She co-hosted the Making it to the Mansion casting special for the fifteenth season alongside former bad girls; Camilla Poindexter, Jasmine Carter, Jelaminah Lanier and Tanisha Thomas.

Booth worked in Atlanta, Georgia before moving to Los Angeles, California to start acting and comedy classes. In 2022 she starred in HBO Max's television series Rap Sh!t. Her initial audition for the series was unsuccessful, she was given a second opportunity to audition for the series after she directly contacted the casting director through Instagram. In 2023 she starred in an episode of Peacock's original series Mrs. Davis. In 2026, it was announced Booth was cast in the Snoop Dogg upcoming biopic, Snoop.

== Personal life ==
Booth is bisexual. She is originally from Wentzville, Missouri and played basketball at Fort Zumwalt South High School. She majored in Psychology at Missouri Valley College. Her younger brother Jonigan Booth is also an actor and starred in the 2024 film; The Underdoggs.

== Filmography ==
Year	Title	Role	Notes
2014	Bad Girls Club season 12: Chicago	Self; original bad girl	17 episodes
2014	The Bianca Bee Show	Self; guest	1 episode
2015	Oddly Oden	Blair	2 episodes
2015	Bad Girls Club season 14: Back for More	Self; guest	1 episode
2016	Bad Girls Club season 15: Twisted Sisters	Self; co-host	Making it to the Mansion casting special
2016	Real Housewives of Atlanta	Self; guest	1 episode
2016	XXI: O'Day	Raya	
2018	Discovering Brooklyn	Kai Campbell	TV film
2020	Discovering Brooklyn II	Kai Campbell	Short film
2020	Turnt	Jonica	
2021	YIAY Time: The Game Show	Self; contestant	1 episode
2022-2023	Rap Sh!t	Chastity	14 episodes
2023	Mrs. Davis	Malika	1 episode
2025	Out for a Drive	Self; contestant	1 episode
2027	Snoop	Robin "The Lady of Rage" Allen	Filming
