= Bad Girls Club season 13 =

Bad Girls Club
- Season 13
- The original nine "Bad" Girls of season thirteen, left to right: Danielle, Raquel, Jada, Alyssa, Natalie, Julie, Sarah, Judith, Camilla.
- No. of episodes: 13

Release
- Original network: Oxygen
- Original release: September 30, 2014 – January 6, 2015

Season chronology
- ← Previous; Season 12 Next → Season 14

Bad Girls Club: Redemption is the thirteenth installment of the Oxygen reality television series Bad Girls Club. It premiered on October 7, 2014, and concluded on January 6, 2015. The season featured an alumni cast consisting of nine women from the previous seasons. It features life coach Laura Baron from the twelfth season.

== Cast ==
The season began with nine original bad girls. Four were removed by production. One replacement bad girl was introduced in their absence later in the season.

List of bad girls
Bad Girl	Age	Hometown	Season	Replaced
Alyssa "Redd" Carswell	25	Fort Lauderdale, Florida	Chicago	—N/a
Camilla Poindexter	27	Long Beach, California	Las Vegas	—N/a
Danielle "Danni" Victor	26	Methuen, Massachusetts	Las Vegas	—N/a
Jada Looney	28	Queens, New York	Chicago	—N/a
Judith "Judi" Jackson	25	Olympia Fields, Illinois	New Orleans	—N/a
Julie Ofcharsky	25	Boston, Massachusetts	Mexico	—N/a
Natalie Nunn	29	Oakland, California	Los Angeles	—N/a
Raquel "Rocky" Santiago	23	Pine Grove, California	Atlanta	—N/a
Sarah Oliver	29	Riverdale, Georgia	Miami	—N/a
Rimanelli "Rima" Mellal	24	Chicago, Illinois	Mexico	Natalie

=== Duration of cast ===
Bad Girl	Episodes									
Bad Girl	1	2	3	4	5	6	7	8	9	10
Camilla	Featured									
Danni	Featured									
Julie	Featured									
Rocky	Featured									
Sarah	Featured									
Jada	Featured							removed (Note: Jada was removed from the house by production after throwing her high heel in the limousine, which struck Danielle's eyebrow during an altercation with Camilla.)		
Judi	Featured					removed (Note: Judi was removed from the house by production after sending death threats to roommates, and production believed the house was not a good environment for her to stay in.)				
Redd	Featured			removed (Note: Alyssa was removed from the house by production for jumping and biting Natalie's arm, resulting in a wound, during her fight with Raquel.)						
Natalie	Featured			removed (Note: Natalie was removed from the house by production after a physical altercation with Raquel.)						
Rima								Entered (Note: Rimanelli replaced Natalie.)	Featured	

== Episodes ==
No. overall	No. in season	Title	Original release date	Viewers (millions)
209	1	"Return to the Mansion"	September 30, 2014	0.653
The Girls who will soon arrive at the Los Angeles mansion for season 13 are introduced, though they come from different seasons and backgrounds, they all have one thing in common, they are seeking redemption.
210	2	"Bad Girls Don't Cry"	October 7, 2014	1.286
Season 13 opens with an all-star cast of "bad girls" returning to the fold, but Judi proves that old habits die hard. The girls don't believe that Natalie has changed into a bigger woman and slowly see through her evil ways. Judi's friendships with Julie and Danni start to crack due to Judi's old drinking ways.
211	3	"Judging Judi"	October 14, 2014	1.186
Judi forges an alliance with two unlikely housemates, irritating Julie and Danni. After Natalie said that she wanted Judi out of the house, and then see her being friends with her the next day, the other girls question her loyalty leading to Camilla throw a drink at Natalie, and Redd spitting at her in the face. Rocky tries to understand Judi's low self esteem through a tearful conversation which brings them closer together.
212	4	"Lashing Out"	October 21, 2014	1.510
A different side of Jada emerges as Judi continues to live in Natalie's shadow. Meanwhile, Camilla finds out someone took her eyelashes without asking her. After she confronted everyone, Judi tells Sarah, Natalie and Rocky that she took the eyelashes, sparking a huge argument between Camilla and Jada against Judi. After Jada's cigarettes go missing, she immediately targets Judi, leading to Judi to throw a cup of alcohol in Jada's face. Judi is ultimately sent to a hotel.
213	5	"Birthday Blowout"	October 28, 2014	1.077
Judi comes back to the house after spending the night in a hotel. Natalie calls out Camilla which sparks a huge argument leading to Rocky to defend Camilla which eventually ends up in a physical altercation between Natalie and Rocky & Redd. Natalie is sent packing after starting the fight, and Redd is sent packing for physically attacking Natalie and biting her arm. Elsewhere, Danni celebrates her first birthday without her twin sister Gabi and tries to make the best of it. After the girls start talking about how happy they were to see Natalie get beat up, Sarah and Judi decide to leave Danni's birthday dinner and hide all of the family pictures that are on the wall. Note: Natalie and Redd are both removed from the house.
214	6	"Glitter Beef"	November 4, 2014	1.518
Sarah and Judi unite and face off with their housemates after the other girls found out they hid the family photos. While an attempt at bonding together for charity, it eventually drives the girls further apart.
215	7	"Rocky-ing the Boat"	November 11, 2014	1.236
Rocky and Jada continue to feud with Sarah and Judi. Judi and Sarah continue to face off with the rest of the roommates. Judi makes a shocking decision to leave the house after getting tired of the girl's bullying antics. Tension slowly starts to mount between Camilla & Jada. Note: Judi is removed from the house.
216	8	"Trouble In Paradise"	November 18, 2014	1.511
The girls fly to Hawaii. Danni and Judi's friendship gets driven apart even more. Sarah joins the Camilla and Danni clique. Jada destroys Camilla's camera sparking in a huge argument on the way back home from Hawaii.
217	9	"Mama Drama"	November 25, 2014	1.293
The girls come home and see the new girl, Rima. Camilla and Jada have a huge altercation in the limo, leading to Jada throwing a heal across the bus, which eventually hits Danni in the eyebrow, leading to her eyebrow to be busted open and bleeding. Jada is sent home for causing physical harm to Danni. The girls' family arrive for parents weekend. Notes: Rima replaces Judi. Jada is removed from the house.
218	10	"Twerk It Out"	December 2, 2014	1.641
Family Weekend continues, as long-established issues surface. Meanwhile the passing of a friend impacts Camilla.
219	11	"Girl, Bye!"	December 9, 2014	1.681
Rocky bravely admits her sexuality to her dad. Camilla calls Jada and apologizes for what she said about her mother. The girls leave.
220	12	"Reunion: Part 1"	December 16, 2014	1.736
The Bad Girls return to Los Angeles, except Julie, who didn't want to come, Natalie, who couldn't come, and Redd, who was not allowed to come. Natalie shares shocking news with Judi and Sarah.
221	13	"Reunion: Part 2"	December 23, 2014	1.749
Sarah's craziness comes to a boil leading to a physical altercation between her and Rocky, leading to Sarah getting kicked off the reunion for the second time. Jada comes out resulting in a nightmare on stage between her and Camilla. After Jada punches Danni in the face, Tanisha has some words for her, resulting in a huge argument.
222	14	"Reunion: Part 3"	January 6, 2015	1.528
The episode picks up with Tanisha yelling at Jada and Rima. Rima decides to try and attack Judi when she comes out onto stage, leading to her getting kicked off the reunion. Redd shares her experience about this season via Skype, and Natalie shares her experience via video. The all stars officially say goodbye to this season of Bad Girls Club Redemption.
