= Love Games: Bad Girls Need Love Too season 4 =

Love Games: Bad Girls Need Love Too
- Season 4
- No. of episodes: 9

Release
- Original network: Oxygen
- Original release: November 5, 2012 – January 15, 2013

Season chronology
- ← Previous; Season 3

The fourth season of Love Games: Bad Girls Need Love Too premiered on November 5, 2012, and ran for nine episodes. It is hosted by Bad Girls Club alumni Tanisha Thomas.

== Format ==
Alumni from previous seasons of Bad Girls Club are "looking for the man of their dreams." Three "bad girls" have a choice of 14 bachelors to explore love, friendships, etc. Each week features a variety of challenges. The "bad girls" battle it out and compete to be the "HBIC" - Head Bad Girl In Charge.

The "HBIC" chooses who is up for elimination. The HBIC gets a card that gives her power that causes twists throughout the game. Two alumni bad boys have come back to compete for love, Taylor from Love Games 2 and Joey from Love Games 3. The girls are Amy, Danni, and Camilla from season eight, making this the first season of Love Games to feature three girls from the same Bad Girls Club season, and the first to feature a replacement Bad Girl as a cast member.

== Cast ==
=== "Bad Girls" ===
Name	Age	BGC season	Eliminated
Amy Cieslowski	24	Season 8	Winner
Camilla Poindexter	25	Season 8	2nd place
Danielle "Danni" Victor	24	Season 8	3rd place

=== Contestants ===
Name	Age	Hometown	Title name	Eliminated
Joey Paggi	23	Miami, Florida	The Comeback Kid	Winner
Shane Steinman	26	West Palm Beach, Florida	Chef Surf & Turf	Episode 9 (runner-up)
Tyrone Geary	22	Philadelphia, Pennsylvania	Little Big Man	Episode 9
Andre Parr	27	Atlanta, Georgia	The Smooth Operator	Episode 9
Casey Cartel	25	Brooklyn, New York	Casey Cartel	Episode 9
Taylor Fortinberry	26	Tuscaloosa, Alabama	The Preppy	Episode 8
Brandon Lamar	30	New York, New York	BraNNue Life	Episode 7
Jamin Olivencia	26	Louisville, Kentucky	The Bodyslammer	Episode 6
Josh Norris	26	Washington, D.C.	The Magic Man	Episode 5
Danny Myers	24	San Mateo, California	The Tough Guy	Episode 5
Travis Hatfield	24	Austin, Texas	Guy-Liner	Episode 4
Devin Lewis	33	Atlanta, Georgia	Mr. Touchdown	Episode 3
Mo Saaidi	23	East Lansing, Michigan	The Pretty Boy	Episode 2
Javier Diaz	22	Miami, Florida	Mr. South Beach	Episode 1

== Game history ==
Contestants	Episodes								
Contestants	1	2	3	4	5	6	7	8	9
Amy	SAFE	SAFE	HBIC	HBIC	SAFE	SAFE	SAFE	SAFE	WINNER
Camilla	HBIC	SAFE	SAFE	SAFE	SAFE	HBIC	SAFE	SAFE	ELIM
Danni	SAFE	HBIC	SAFE	SAFE	HBIC	SAFE	HBIC	ELIM	
Joey	SAFE	SAFE	SAFE	SAFE	SAFE	SAFE	SAFE	SAFE	WINNER
Shane	SAFE	SAFE	BTM 3	SAFE	SAFE	BTM 3	SAFE	BTM 3	ELIM
Tyrone	BTM 3	SAFE	ELIM	SAFE	SAFE	SAFE	BTM 3	BTM 3	ELIM
Andre	SAFE	SAFE	SAFE	SAFE	SAFE	BTM 3	SAFE	SAFE	ELIM
Casey	SAFE	BTM 3	SAFE	SAFE	BTM 5	SAFE	SAFE	SAFE	ELIM
Taylor	SAFE	SAFE	SAFE	BTM 3	SAFE	SAFE	BTM 3	ELIM	
Brandon	SAFE	SAFE	SAFE	SAFE	BTM 5	SAFE	ELIM		
Jamin	SAFE	SAFE	SAFE	SAFE	BTM 5	ELIM			
Josh	SAFE	SAFE	SAFE	BTM3	ELIM				
Danny	BTM 3	SAFE	SAFE	SAFE	ELIM				
Travis	SAFE	SAFE	SAFE	ELIM					
Devin	SAFE	BTM3	ELIM						
Mo	SAFE	ELIM							
Javier	ELIM								

The contestant is the Bad Girl
The contestant is a male
This contestant was the HBIC
This contestant was placed on a date by the HBIC
This contestant was chosen to go on a second date by one of the girls
This contestant was chosen to go on a second date but was also in the bottom 3
This contestant was put in the bottom 3 by the HBIC
This contestant was eliminated
This contestant was eliminated by the other girls but then saved by the HBIC
This contestant was place on a date by the HBIC but was also immune due to a previous power
This contestant was originally put in the bottom 3 by the HBIC, but was swapped by the HBIC for another guy to be up for elimination

== Episodes ==
No.	Title	Original release date	U.S. viewers (millions)
1	"Let the Badness Begin"	November 5, 2012	N/A
A game changing twist shakes things up while the girls kiss and grope their way into the guys' hearts.
2	"Sex, Lies and Condiments"	November 12, 2012	0.53
Sexual tension escalates when a sex therapist pays a visit. Elsewhere, rumors swirl about a rival competitor, sparking a battle royal among the bachelors.
3	"Step Up and Strip Down"	November 19, 2012	0.58
A rivalry between two bachelors heats up when they vie for the attention of a bad girl. Elsewhere, the ladies showcase their dancing skills for choreographer Lil' C.
4	"Hollywood Heartbreak"	November 26, 2012	0.42
The ladies and the bachelors participate in a sizzling beachfront challenge. Anger swells when Amy woos one of Danni’s favorite bachelors.
5	"Up in the Fight Club"	December 3, 2012	0.55
A challenge puts the bachelors in the hot seat when everyone gets to hear clips from their interviews. Drama starts when a contestant tells Dani that another one of the contestant has a girlfriend at home. Joey and Danny get into a physical altercation at the club, which get them kicked out. Joey and Danny get into another physical altercation again at the house. Taylor wanted to start a fight with Shane. The two get into a physical altercation too. Camilla gets in a physical altercation with a contender after he insults her and gets mad at her for not bringing him to her date.
6	"Ex Marks the Spot"	December 10, 2012	0.43
The guys' ex-girlfriends arrive and rattle the ladies. Elsewhere, deceit jeopardizes Camilla's island date.
7	"For Love Games or Money..."	December 17, 2012	0.43
The guys had to spend top dollar one the bad girls. Camilla and Danni feud over one of the guys.
8	"Three Girls Enter, One Girl Leaves"	January 8, 2013	0.78
Three nemeses from the ladies' pasts pay a visit and one bad girl is eliminated.
9	"...And In The End"	January 15, 2013	1.11
The winning couple is revealed in the Season 4 finale, which comes with a twist.
