= Love Games: Bad Girls Need Love Too season 3 =

Love Games: Bad Girls Need Love Too
- Season 3
- No. of episodes: 8

Release
- Original network: Oxygen
- Original release: December 5, 2011 – January 23, 2012

Season chronology
- ← Previous; Season 2 Next → Season 4

The third season of Love Games: Bad Girls Need Love Too premiered on December 5, 2011, with Tanisha Thomas returning as the host. The season ran for eight episodes and concluded on January 23, 2012.

== Format ==
Alumni from previous seasons of The Bad Girls Club are "looking for the man of their dreams." Three "bad girls" have a choice of 13 bachelors to explore love, friendships, etc. The bad girls are Sydney and Kori from Season 6 and Judi from Season 7. Each week features a variety of challenges. The "bad girls" battle it out and compete to be the "HBIC" - Head Bad Girl In Charge. The "HBIC" chooses who is up for elimination.

== Cast ==
=== "Bad Girls" ===
From left to right: Kori, Sydney, Judi

Name	BGC season	Eliminated
Judi Jai	Season 7	Winner
Kori Koether	Season 6	Runner-up
Sydney Steinfeldt	Season 6	Episode 7

=== Contestants ===
Name	Age	Hometown	Title name	Eliminated
Matthew Goodman	23	Atlanta, Georgia	The Gentleman G.	Winner
John "Slim" Marshal	23	Atlanta, Georgia	The Player	Episode 8, runner-up
Joey Paggi	21	Gainesville, Florida	The Funny Guy	Episode 8, runner-up
Edson Segarra	23	Atlantic City, New Jersey	The Silly Guy	Episode 8
Nick Heldreth	25	Kailua, Hawaii	Mr. All American	Episode 8
Jonathan Peterburs	23	Trenton, New Jersey	Freaky Jon P	Episode 7
Chris Kirk	21	San Diego, California	The Boy Next Door	Episode 6
Robby Fiore	25	Chicago, Illinois	The Model	Episode 5
Pasquale Ugenti	24	New Rochelle, New York	Mr. In Your Face	Episode 4
Jordan Cuesta	21	Miami, Florida	The Latin Rapper	Episode 3
Michael Vaidik	24	Bloomington, Indiana	The Ultimate Bro	Episode 2
Nick Freeman	24	Baltimore, Maryland	Mr. Keeping It Real	Episode 1
Dusty Humfeld	23	La Crosse, Wisconsin	The Farm Boy	Episode 1

== Game history ==
Contestants	Episodes							
Contestants	1	2	3	4	5	6	7	8
Judi	SAFE	HBIC	SAFE	SAFE	SAFE	HBIC	HBIC	WINNER
Kori	HBIC	SAFE	SAFE	SAFE	HBIC	SAFE	SAFE	ELIM
Sydney	SAFE	SAFE	HBIC	HBIC	SAFE	SAFE	ELIM	
Matthew	SAFE	SAFE	SAFE	BTM 3	SAFE	SAFE	SAFE	WINNER
John	BTM 3	SAFE	SAFE	SAFE	SAFE	SAFE	SAFE	ELIM
Joey	BTM 3	BTM 3	SAFE	SAFE	SAFE	BTM 3	BTM 3	ELIM
Nick H.	SAFE	SAFE	SAFE	SAFE	SAFE	BTM 3	BTM 3	ELIM
Edson	BTM 3	SAFE	SAFE	SAFE	BTM 3	SAFE	SAFE	ELIM
Jonathan	BTM 3	SAFE	BTM 3	SAFE	BTM 3	SAFE	ELIM	
Chris	SAFE	BTM 3	SAFE	BTM 3	SAFE	ELIM		
Robby	SAFE	SAFE	SAFE	SAFE	ELIM			
Pasquale	SAFE	SAFE	BTM 3	ELIM				
Jordan	SAFE	SAFE	ELIM					
Michael	SAFE	ELIM						
Nick F.	ELIM							
Dusty	ELIM							

The contestant is the Bad Girl
The contestant is a male
This contestant was the HBIC
This contestant was put in the bottom 3 by the HBIC
This contestant was eliminated

== Episodes ==
No.	Title	Original release date	U.S. viewers (millions)
1	"Let the Bad Begin"	December 5, 2011	0.58
Three former Bad Girls meet 13 eligible guys looking for love. Tensions between Kori and Sydney come to blows.
2	"Boys and Battle Raps"	December 12, 2011	0.68
The ladies must show rhyme and reason by displaying their rap skills before guest judge Too $hort. In other news, drama swells and alliances alter when Judi inches toward one of Sydney's suitors.
3	"Rock the Boat"	December 19, 2011	0.53
The ladies bask in a bash on a tiki boat, but it doesn't go swimmingly well when one suitor irritates the others.
4	"Heartbeats and Heartache"	December 26, 2011	0.54
Anger erupts when Sydney and Kori conspire against Judi. Meanwhile, Sydney's fixation with a suitor affects her game; and the ladies get down and dirty in a ploy to win over the bachelors.
5	"Ex's and Oh's"	January 2, 2012	0.76
Exes from the men's pasts make an unforeseen visit, turning the matchmaking competition upside down. Their surprise arrival aggravates Sydney. The girls and the contestants are split up into 3 teams where they put on a show for the boys' exes. Afterward, the girls ask the contestants and their exes intimate questions pertaining to their love life.
6	"Diamonds Are a Bad Girl's Best Friend"	January 9, 2012	0.77
The guys buy jewelry for the girls, and the girl with the highest dollar amount will win HBIC. Judi's insecurities get the best of her and John continues to play mind games with Sydney.
7	"Players Will Play"	January 16, 2012	0.80
A succession of extreme dares challenges the women, and the game comes to a swift end for one lady. Natalie Nunn makes an appearance, fraying nerves in the process.
8	"Happily Ever After"	January 23, 2012	N/A
The winning couple is revealed in the Season 3 finale.
