= Bad Girls Club season 12 =

Bad Girls Club
- Season 12
- The original seven bad girls, from left to right: Aysia, Jonica, Jada, Loren, Alexandria, Brittany, and Alyssa. Aysia is pictured in Linsey's absence despite being a replacement
- No. of episodes: 17

Release
- Original network: Oxygen
- Original release: May 13 – September 9, 2014

Season chronology
- ← Previous; Season 11 Next → Season 13

The twelfth season of the Oxygen reality television series Bad Girls Club is titled Bad Girls Club: Chicago. Life coach Laura Baron makes appearances throughout the season to help the girls, starting a recurring role that lasts until the end of Season 15. Filming for the season ran from August to October 2013.

== Local reception ==
Prior to filming, residents of Highland Park voiced concern over production due to the show's negative image. Chicago Tribune community contributor Peter Lubin cited the Sherman Oaks residents' complaints during the production of the show's sixth season in 2011. However, Sally Higginson of the Sun-Times Media Group countered the criticism, arguing that the publicity would contribute to the city's history, writing, '"Ferris Bueller's Day Off" is a paean to playing hooky. "Risky Business" pays homage to the world's oldest profession. "Ordinary People" dwells on drowning and suicide. What reputation are we upholding?'

== Residence ==
The cast lived at 65 Vine Avenue in Highland Park, Illinois, a northern suburb of Chicago. The residence included a private courtyard entry, an enthralling entrance hall, a resplendent foyer, a circular living room, an oval-shaped dining room that was converted to the "subway-themed" phone room, a wet bar which was converted into the computer area, an avant-garde kitchen, a library in which was substituted as the therapy room for the girls' one on one interviews with Laura the Life Coach, and a swimming pool which overlooked Lake Michigan.

The 2.6 acre property was designed by Arnold S. Schaffner and built by Jerome Factor. The official house tour was posted via YouTube on April 4, 2014, and presented by production designer Jeff Eyser and art director Alexis Karpf. In 2017, the original construction and landscape of the house was demolished to make way for a new home.

== Cast ==
=== Original Bad Girls ===
Name	Age (Note: Age at the time of filming)	Hometown	Nickname
Alexandria "Alex" Rice	22	Sherwood, Wisconsin	The Hot Model
Alyssa "Redd" Carswell	24	Fort Lauderdale, Florida	The Luscious Loudmouth
Brittany "Britt" Britton	24	Louisville, Kentucky	The Country Hustler
Jada Looney	28	Queens, New York	The Rough Rhymer
Jonica "Blu" Booth	25	St. Louis, Missouri	The Chick Magnet
Linsey Berardi †	21	Brooklyn, New York	The Brooklyn Brat
Loren "Lo" Jordan (Note: Loren and Raesha are cousins.)	23	Mobile, Alabama	The Mobile Belle

=== Replacement Bad Girls ===
Name	Age (Note: Age at the time of filming)	Hometown	Nickname	Replaced
Aysia Garza	22	Klein, Texas	The Texas Temptress	Linsey
Dalila Ortiz	26	Chicago, Illinois	The Chicago Wildcard	Alyssa
Raesha Clanton	23	Mobile, Alabama	The Alabama Slammer	Brittany

=== Duration of Cast ===
Bad Girl	Episodes													
Bad Girl	1	2	3	4	5	6	7	8	9	10	11	12	13	14
Jada	Featured													
Jonica	Featured													
Loren	Featured													
Alex	Featured													Kicked (Note: Alexandria was kicked out of the house by the rest of the girls after a heated altercation with Loren, Jonica and Jada, and being forced to leave.)
Britt	Featured											removed (Note: Brittany was removed from the house after physically attacking and causing harm to Dalila.)		
Redd	Featured										removed (Note: Alyssa was removed from the house after multiple physical altercations with Jada and being violent towards the production crew.)			
Linsey	Featured	removed (Note: Linsey was removed from the house after multiple physical altercations with Jada and physically attacking the production crew.)												
Aysia			Entered (Note: Aysia replaced Linsey.)	Featured										
Dalila												Entered (Note: Dalila replaced Alyssa.)	Left (Note: Dalila voluntarily left the house after multiple altercations with Loren and Jonica.)	
Raesha													Entered (Note: Raesha replaced Brittany)	Featured

== Episodes ==
No. overall	No. in season	Title	Original release date	Viewers (millions)
191	0	"Making It to the Mansion"	May 6, 2014	0.617
Camilla Poindexter & Natalie Nunn introduce the 12th season cast.
192	1	"Breaking Bad Girls"	May 13, 2014	1.494
Seven Bad Girls take to the Windy City, but one bad girl starts multiple arguments and fights over the smallest things. Linsey and Jada have multiple fights in the limo ending with a cliffhanger.
193	2	"Model Behavior"	May 20, 2014	1.248
The fight between Linsey and Jada leads Linsey to snap. Linsey attacks the camera crew which leads to her departure. Jada's flip-flopping antics lead Loren to snap which leads to a huge blowout. Note: Linsey is removed from the house.
194	3	"A Change For The Bad!"	May 27, 2014	1.222
New girl Aysia wastes no time coming to make friends leading to a physical altercation between her and Jada. After quickly realizing she messed up, Aysia and Jada make amends. Redd's tormenting pushes Jada closer to the brink. Note: Aysia replaces Linsey.
195	4	"The Fabtastic Four"	June 3, 2014	1.736
Dynamics are questioned when Jonica's girlfriend arrives. Loren, Redd, Brittany and Jonica start a clique, excluding Aysia, Alex and Jada. Loren has a huge argument with Aysia.
196	5	"Seeing Redd"	June 10, 2014	1.827
The roommates try to put their differences aside as they head north on a trip to Lake Geneva, but Redd finds herself on the warpath as her simmering feud with one roommate leads to a fiery altercation.
197	6	"Reddemption"	June 17, 2014	1.307
After Jonica notices Redd's constant pleads for attention, the rest of the girls decide to take a step back. Meanwhile, Britt aims for a new target.
198	7	"A Diamond Is Not Forever"	June 24, 2014	1.418
As Jada continues to get on the girls' nerves, Loren steps up to handle the situation. Meanwhile, Aysia slips up and mentions something about her and Jonica.
199	8	"Rapper's Anonymous"	July 1, 2014	1.773
Jada finally comes back to the house but Loren won't let her get a pass until a fight occurs. Jada decides to make her music career to a higher level. Redd gets some bad news leading to her departure. Note: Redd voluntarily leaves the house.
200	9	"That's A Rap"	July 8, 2014	1.132
As Jada begins to focus more on her career, she aligns herself with fellow outcast Alex. Meanwhile, Aysia starts to fit in with the other girls. Redd returns to the house. Note: Redd returns to the house.
201	10	"Bad News Britt"	July 15, 2014	1.545
Britt tries to find her purpose in the house, and considers leaving the house. Aysia finds out her grandma died. She leaves to go to her funeral, but comes back later in the episode. The girls go to the Sears Tower. Note: Aysia voluntarily leaves the house, but returns.
202	11	"Family Affairs"	July 29, 2014	1.816
The girls' families come to visit, and try to view their time in the house in a different perception. Meanwhile, the tension between Redd and Jada leads into a huge blowout in the limo which leads to a shocking departure. Note: Redd is removed from the house.
203	12	"Insults and Injuries"	August 5, 2014	1.719
New girl Dalila enters the house insulting everyone. Britt finally has had enough and decides to take her anger out on Dalila leaving the girls confused on why Britt attacked Dalila after a couple of minutes. The girls have a calendar photo shoot. Note: Dalila replaces Redd. Britt is removed from the house.
204	13	"Easy Come, Easy Go"	August 12, 2014	1.645
Loren and Jonica declare war on Dalila leading to an altercation between Loren leaving her to throw pickle juice and sugar on Dalila leading to Dalila's departure. New replacement Raesha arrives to the mansion. Raesha and Loren tell the other girls they are cousins. Raesha immediately fits in with everyone except for Aysia. The girls head off to Barcelona leaving Alex starting to wonder who her real friends are in the house after an altercation with Loren and Jonica. Note: Dalila voluntarily leaves the house. Raesha replaces Brittany.
205	14	"Smell Ya Later!"	August 19, 2014	1.500
Jonica tells Loren everything Alex has said about her. Jada, Loren and Jonica confront Alex which leads to a heated confrontation and leads to another departure. Aysia questions Jonica how she really feels about her. The girls say goodbye to Chicago. Note: Alex is kicked out of the house.
206	15	"Reunion: Part 1"	August 26, 2014	1.745
The girls reunite in Los Angeles to settle things once and for all but tempers flare when Aysia has a physical altercation with Blu's ex-girlfriend Diamond.
207	16	"Reunion: Part 2"	September 2, 2014	1.948
The episode picks up with the fight between Diamond and Aysia leading to Jada jump in which irritates everyone. After Jada goes backstage stating she's leaving, that doesn't sit well with Redd and Britt. After Diamond states Jada tried to jump her, that sparks anger between Redd and Britt leading to a huge blowout behind stage.
208	17	"Reunion: Part 3"	September 9, 2014	1.932
The episode picks up with the fight between Jada and Britt. Jada and Loren get into another fight leading to Raesha jump in. Dalila comes out and has unfinished business with Britt leading to Dalila slapping Britt. Redd comes out with a lot to say to Jada. Laura comes to the reunion and has a talk with the girls.
