= List of Bad Girls Club episodes =

The following is a list of episodes of the American reality television series Bad Girls Club broadcast on Oxygen. It was first shown on December 5, 2006 and ended on in mid-2017. As of 2017, 275 episodes have aired, including specials. Bad Girls Club has spawned four spin-off series: Bad Girls Road Trip, Bad Girls All-Star Battle, Love Games: Bad Girls Need Love Too and Tanisha Gets Married.

== Series overview ==
Season	Episodes	Originally released	
Season	Episodes	First released	Last released
1	22	December 5, 2006	June 5, 2007
2	24	December 4, 2007	May 20, 2008
3	15	December 2, 2008	March 31, 2009
4	16	December 1, 2009	March 23, 2010
5	16	August 3, 2010	November 23, 2010
6	15	January 10, 2011	May 9, 2011
7	15	August 1, 2011	November 14, 2011
8	15	January 23, 2012	May 7, 2012
9	16	July 9, 2012	November 5, 2012
10	17	January 15, 2013	May 21, 2013
11	17	August 13, 2013	December 17, 2013
12	17	May 13, 2014	September 9, 2014
13	14	October 7, 2014	January 6, 2015
14	12	August 11, 2015	November 3, 2015
15	13	March 15, 2016	June 7, 2016
16	12	September 13, 2016	December 13, 2016
17	12	February 14, 2017	May 2, 2017

== Episodes ==
=== Season 1 (2006–07) ===
No. overall	No. in season	Title	Original release date	Prod. code
1	1	"It's Easier to Be Bad"	December 5, 2006	101
2	2	"A Rude Awakening"	December 12, 2006	102
3	3	"Quick Fix"	December 19, 2006	103
4	4	"A Tomik Bomb"	January 2, 2007	104
5	5	"Out With the Old, in With the New"	January 9, 2007	105
6	6	"The Trouble With Boys"	January 16, 2007	106
7	7	"Miss Understanding"	January 23, 2007	107
8	8	"Not a Happy Camper"	January 30, 2007	108
9	9	"Smack My Beach Up"	February 6, 2007	109
10	10	"And the Walls Come Tomberlin Down"	February 13, 2007	110
11	11	"Drop of a Hat"	February 20, 2007	111
12	12	"She Said, She Said"	February 27, 2007	112
13	13	"Holy Ghost"	March 6, 2007	113
14	14	"What Are Little Girls Made Of?"	March 13, 2007	114
15	15	"Kiss and Tell"	March 20, 2007	115
16	16	"Rocky Road"	March 27, 2007	116
17	17	"Chicken Scratch"	April 3, 2007	117
18	18	"A Little Ditty About Steve and DeAnn"	April 10, 2007	118
19	19	"Lord of the Lies"	April 17, 2007	119
20	20	"Happy Ending"	April 24, 2007	120
21	21	"Shrink Wrapped: Reunion"	May 1, 2007	121
22	22	"Outrageous & Unseen"	June 5, 2007	122

=== Season 2 (2007–08) ===
No. overall	No. in season	Title	Original release date	Prod. code
23	1	"Bad Company"	December 4, 2007	201
24	2	"Battle Lines"	December 11, 2007	202
25	3	"Spilled Milk"	December 18, 2007	203
26	4	"Music and Lyric"	January 1, 2008	204
27	5	"Pop Off!"	January 8, 2008	205
28	6	"Prank Wars Part 1: Party Girls Strike Back"	January 15, 2008	206
29	7	"Prank Wars Part 2: Mark Your Territory"	January 22, 2008	207
30	8	"Prank Wars Part 3: Phat Lady"	January 29, 2008	208
31	9	"Love Conquers All"	February 5, 2008	209
32	10	"Return of the Juice, Death of the Truce"	February 12, 2008	210
33	11	"Sucker Punched"	February 19, 2008	211
34	12	"Taken for a Ride"	February 26, 2008	212
35	13	"Cordelia and the Chamber of Secrets"	March 4, 2008	213
36	14	"Bad Riddance"	March 11, 2008	214
37	15	"With Friends Like These..."	March 18, 2008	215
38	16	"Threesome and Then Some"	March 25, 2008	216
39	17	"Disorderly Conduct"	April 1, 2008	217
40	18	"The Ugly Drunkling"	April 8, 2008	218
41	19	"Ghouls Gone Wild"	April 15, 2008	219
42	20	"Three's a Crowd"	April 22, 2008	220
43	21	"Happy Trails"	April 29, 2008	221
44	22	"Pimp Down"	May 6, 2008	222
45	23	"All BAD Things Must Come to an End"	May 13, 2008	223
46	24	"Unfinished Business"	May 20, 2008	224

=== Season 3 (2008–09) ===
No. overall	No. in season	Title	Original release date	Viewers (millions)
47	1	"Breaking and Entering"	December 2, 2008	0.807
48	2	"I Got Your Backbone"	December 9, 2008	1.012
49	3	"Boston Tea Party"	December 16, 2008	1.129
50	4	"The Naked Truth"	January 6, 2009	0.862
51	5	"The Tipping Point"	January 13, 2009	1.314
52	6	"Popping In!"	January 20, 2009	1.207
53	7	"Who Is This B..."	January 27, 2009	1.333
54	8	"What Happens In Vegas...Airs on TV"	February 3, 2009	1.198
55	9	"This Is NOT The Amber Show"	February 10, 2009	0.874
56	10	"Ailea of the Storm"	February 24, 2009	1.201
57	11	"Make a Run For the Border"	March 3, 2009	1.230
58	12	"The Cookie Crumbles"	March 10, 2009	1.620
59	13	"This is the Amber Show"	March 17, 2009	1.009
60	14	"All's Well That Ends Bad"	March 24, 2009	1.446
61	15	"Unresolved Issues"	March 31, 2009	1.570

=== Season 4 (2009-10) ===
No. overall	No. in season	Title	Original release date	Viewers (millions)
62	1	"Off the Wall"	December 1, 2009	0.874
63	2	"I Run LA!"	December 8, 2009	1.412
64	3	"No More Nice Girls"	December 15, 2009	1.420
65	4	"Can Buy Me Love"	December 22, 2009	1.767
66	5	"Don't Sweat the New Bitch"	January 5, 2010	1.682
67	6	"Paul and Kate Plus Hate"	January 12, 2010	1.773
68	7	"Bad Break"	January 19, 2010	2.009
69	8	"Friend??? Or Frenemy?"	January 26, 2010	1.908
70	9	"Sex, Lies and Bigfoot"	February 2, 2010	1.617
71	10	"Go With the Flo"	February 9, 2010	2.227
72	11	"The Puppet Master"	February 16, 2010	2.139
73	12	"Clip Show"	February 23, 2010	1.784
74	13	"Amber Alert!"	March 2, 2010	1.667
75	14	"Out With a Bang"	March 9, 2010	1.905
76	15	"Reunion: Part 1"	March 16, 2010	2.003
77	16	"Reunion: Part 2"	March 23, 2010	2.062

=== Season 5 (2010) ===
No. overall	No. in season	Title	Original release date	Viewers (millions)
78	1	"Welcome to Miami Beyotch"	August 3, 2010	1.34
79	2	"Check Your Baggage"	August 10, 2010	1.57
80	3	"Where's The Money Honey"	August 17, 2010	1.54
81	4	"Talkin' Smack"	August 24, 2010	1.47
82	5	"Beach Blanket Bad Girls"	August 31, 2010	1.96
83	6	"Jamaican Me Crazy"	September 14, 2010	1.94
84	7	"Threesome's A Crowd"	September 21, 2010	1.87
85	8	"Departures and Arrivals"	September 28, 2010	1.72
86	9	"Life's a Bleach"	October 5, 2010	1.77
87	10	"Who Runs Miami?"	October 19, 2010	1.70
88	11	"Brandi On The Rocks"	October 26, 2010	1.54
89	12	"The Wicked Witch of Key West"	November 2, 2010	1.73
90	13	"Punching Out"	November 9, 2010	1.71
91	14	"Reunion: Part 1"	November 16, 2010	2.07
92	15	"Reunion: Part 2"	November 23, 2010	1.90
93	16	"BGC: Top 10 OMG's"	November 30, 2010	1.14

=== Season 6 (2011) ===
No. overall	No. in season	Title	Original release date	Viewers (millions)
94	1	"Hotter in Hollywood"	January 10, 2011	1.71
95	2	"Broverload"	January 17, 2011	1.49
96	3	"Pool Charks"	January 24, 2011	1.85
97	4	"From Ashes to Clashes"	February 7, 2011	1.63
98	5	"Kentucky Fried and Char Broiled"	February 14, 2011	1.13
99	6	"Play With It"	February 21, 2011	1.41
100	7	"Beat-Down Barbie"	March 7, 2011	1.43
101	8	"Weak Sauce"	March 14, 2011	1.46
102	9	"Power Trippin"	March 21, 2011	1.57
103	10	"Wilma Goes BAMM-BAMM"	March 28, 2011	1.63
104	11	"Don't Hate La Playa"	April 11, 2011	1.36
105	12	"Army of One"	April 18, 2011	1.61
106	13	"Only the Bad Remain"	April 25, 2011	1.36
107	14	"Reunion: Part 1"	May 2, 2011	1.55
108	15	"Reunion: Part 2"	May 9, 2011	1.48

=== Season 7 (2011) ===
No. overall	No. in season	Title	Original release date	Viewers (millions)
109	1	"I Got the Voodoo for U"	August 1, 2011	1.38
110	2	"Call Me Karma"	August 8, 2011	1.25
111	3	"A Tale of Two Cliques"	August 15, 2011	1.30
112	4	"Can I Bayou A Drink?"	August 22, 2011	1.28
113	5	"Playing for the Other Team"	August 29, 2011	1.28
114	6	"Better Off Dread"	September 5, 2011	1.28
115	7	"Cat Scratch Fever"	September 12, 2011	1.49
116	8	"An Eye for An Eye"	September 19, 2011	1.64
117	9	"Revenge Is a Dish Best Served Cold"	September 26, 2011	1.75
118	10	"Tirades, Truces and Tiaras"	October 3, 2011	1.81
119	11	"Keeping It 100"	October 17, 2011	1.77
120	12	"Can't Teach Old Dogs New Tricks"	October 24, 2011	1.62
121	13	"Parting Shots"	October 31, 2011	1.52
122	14	"Reunion: Part 1"	November 7, 2011	1.89
123	15	"Reunion: Part 2"	November 14, 2011	1.48

=== Season 8 (2012) ===
No. overall	No. in season	Title	Original release date	Viewers (millions)
124	1	"Throw Up. Throw Down."	January 23, 2012	1.702
125	2	"Weaving Las Vegas"	January 30, 2012	1.383
126	3	"Chicks Before Hicks"	February 6, 2012	1.333
127	4	"Sink or Swim"	February 13, 2012	1.247
128	5	"A New Elease on Life"	February 20, 2012	1.397
129	6	"Bed, Bathing Suit and Beyond"	February 27, 2012	1.629
130	7	"Invasion of the Scavengers"	March 5, 2012	1.503
131	8	"Sister Act"	March 12, 2012	1.632
132	9	"Evil Pair"	March 19, 2012	1.640
133	10	"Double Trouble"	March 26, 2012	1.888
134	11	"Bad Girl Players"	April 2, 2012	1.446
135	12	"Breakup Breakdown"	April 16, 2012	1.716
136	13	"Go Big Go Home"	April 23, 2012	1.802
137	14	"Reunion: Part 1"	April 30, 2012	2.076
138	15	"Reunion: Part 2"	May 7, 2012	2.162

=== Season 9 (2012) ===
No. overall	No. in season	Title	Original release date	Viewers (millions)
139	1	"One Night In Mexico"	July 9, 2012	1.34
140	2	"Wash, Rinse, Re-beat"	July 16, 2012	1.47
141	3	"The Devil Wears Nada"	July 23, 2012	1.84
142	4	"Girls Gone Ham"	July 30, 2012	1.94
143	5	"Pretty Girl Bounced"	August 6, 2012	1.87
144	6	"Mexican Meltdown"	August 20, 2012	1.50
145	7	"Stage Bite"	August 27, 2012	1.65
146	8	"Miserella"	September 3, 2012	1.28
147	9	"The Tipping Point"	September 10, 2012	1.57
148	10	"Cruisin' for a Brusin'"	September 17, 2012	1.27
149	11	"Hate-Lanta'"	October 1, 2012	1.25
150	12	"Match Made in Mexico"	October 8, 2012	1.22
151	13	"Fist, Fist, Bang Bang"	October 22, 2012	1.56
152	14	"Reunion: Part 1"	October 29, 2012	1.86
153	15	"Reunion: Part 2"	November 5, 2012	1.99
154	16	"Reunion: Part 3"	November 11, 2012	1.90

=== Season 10 (2013) ===
No. overall	No. in season	Title	Original release date	Viewers (millions)
155	0	"Making it to the Mansion, ATL"	January 8, 2013	0.596
156	1	"Southern Discomfort"	January 15, 2013	1.62
157	2	"Houston Ho Down"	January 22, 2013	1.35
158	3	"Molly-Whopped"	January 29, 2013	1.13
159	4	"The Girl Who Cried Mommy"	February 5, 2013	1.15
160	5	"There's Something About Jerry..."	February 12, 2013	1.18
161	6	"Anger Mismanagement"	February 19, 2013	1.31
162	7	"Bottled Up and Beat Down"	February 26, 2013	1.41
163	8	"Gone with the Weave"	March 5, 2013	1.22
164	9	"Between A Rocky and A Hard Place"	March 12, 2013	1.08
165	10	"Don't Cry For Me, Valentina!"	March 19, 2013	1.12
166	11	"Who's Laughing Now"	March 26, 2013	1.21
167	12	"Rocky Like a Hurricane"	April 9, 2013	1.31
168	13	"Greece Up, Get Down"	April 16, 2013	1.16
169	14	"Home Is Where the Hurt Is"	April 23, 2013	1.41
170	15	"Reunion: Part 1"	May 7, 2013	1.38
171	16	"Reunion: Part 2"	May 14, 2013	1.50
172	17	"Reunion: Part 3"	May 21, 2013	1.99

=== Season 11 (2013) ===
No. overall	No. in season	Title	Original release date	Viewers (millions)
173	0	“BGC: Makin’ it to Miami”	August 6, 2013	0.48
174	1	“Premature Evacuation”	August 13, 2013	1.20
175	2	“Waiting, Hating, Instigating”	August 20, 2013	1.03
176	3	“Tap In Tap Out”	August 27, 2013	1.09
177	4	“Hair Today, Gone Tomorrow”	September 3, 2013	1.07
178	5	“Juice-tify My Love”	September 10, 2013	1.24
179	6	“The Queens of Key West”	September 17, 2013	1.47
180	7	“The Bullyguard”	October 1, 2013	1.22
181	8	“Public Enemy Number Two”	October 8, 2013	1.05
182	9	“Weaving With a Bang”	October 15, 2013	0.89
183	10	“Nae, ‘Nae Go Away”	October 22, 2013	1.11
184	11	“Knock Your Socks Off”	October 29, 2013	1.18
185	12	“Cowgirl, Crapshoot”	November 5, 2013	1.35
186	13	“Tropical Punch”	November 19, 2013	1.19
187	14	“Paradise Lost”	November 26, 2013	1.45
188	15	“Reunion: Part 1”	December 3, 2013	1.34
189	16	“Reunion: Part 2”	December 10, 2013	1.65
190	17	“Reunion: Part 3”	December 17, 2013	1.51

=== Season 12 (2014) ===
No. overall	No. in season	Title	Original release date	Viewers (millions)
191	0	"Making It to the Mansion"	May 6, 2014	0.617
192	1	"Breaking Bad Girls"	May 13, 2014	1.494
193	2	"Model Behavior"	May 20, 2014	1.248
194	3	"A Change For The Bad!"	May 27, 2014	1.222
195	4	"The Fabtastic Four"	June 3, 2014	1.736
196	5	"Seeing Redd"	June 10, 2014	1.827
197	6	"Reddemption"	June 17, 2014	1.307
198	7	"A Diamond Is Not Forever"	June 24, 2014	1.418
199	8	"Rapper's Anonymous"	July 1, 2014	1.773
200	9	"That's A Rap"	July 8, 2014	1.132
201	10	"Bad News Britt"	July 15, 2014	1.545
202	11	"Family Affairs"	July 29, 2014	1.816
203	12	"Insults and Injuries"	August 5, 2014	1.719
204	13	"Easy Come, Easy Go"	August 12, 2014	1.645
205	14	"Smell Ya Later!"	August 19, 2014	1.500
206	15	"Reunion: Part 1"	August 26, 2014	1.745
207	16	"Reunion: Part 2"	September 2, 2014	1.948
208	17	"Reunion: Part 3"	September 9, 2014	1.932

=== Season 13 (2014–15) ===
No. overall	No. in season	Title	Original release date	Viewers (millions)
209	1	"Return to the Mansion"	September 30, 2014	0.653
210	2	"Bad Girls Don't Cry"	October 7, 2014	1.286
211	3	"Judging Judi"	October 14, 2014	1.186
212	4	"Lashing Out"	October 21, 2014	1.510
213	5	"Birthday Blowout"	October 28, 2014	1.077
214	6	"Glitter Beef"	November 4, 2014	1.518
215	7	"Rocky-ing the Boat"	November 11, 2014	1.236
216	8	"Trouble In Paradise"	November 18, 2014	1.511
217	9	"Mama Drama"	November 25, 2014	1.293
218	10	"Twerk It Out"	December 2, 2014	1.641
219	11	"Girl, Bye!"	December 9, 2014	1.681
220	12	"Reunion: Part 1"	December 16, 2014	1.736
221	13	"Reunion: Part 2"	December 23, 2014	1.749
222	14	"Reunion: Part 3"	January 6, 2015	1.528

=== Season 14 (2015) ===
No. overall	No. in season	Title	Original release date	Viewers (millions)
223	0	"BGC XIV: Casting Sneak Peek"	August 4, 2015	0.532
224	1	"Once Upon a Turnt Up Time"	August 11, 2015	0.615
225	2	"Double Trouble"	August 18, 2015	0.561
226	3	"Birthday Ho-Down"	August 25, 2015	0.636
227	4	"Flirting With Kat-Tastrophe"	September 1, 2015	0.827
228	5	"Return to Sender"	September 8, 2015	0.690
229	6	"The Keys to Happiness"	September 15, 2015	0.477
230	7	"A Royal Tumble"	September 29, 2015	0.642
231	8	"Twerking for Change"	October 6, 2015	0.709
232	9	"Bye Bye Baby"	October 13, 2015	0.501
233	10	"Going Bye With A Bang"	October 20, 2015	0.521
234	11	"Reunion: Part 1"	October 27, 2015	0.705
235	12	"Reunion: Part 2"	November 3, 2015	0.838

=== Season 15 (2016) ===
No. overall	No. in season	Title	Original release date	Viewers (millions)
236	0	"Casting Special"	March 8, 2016	0.249
237	1	"Sis and The City"	March 15, 2016	0.575
238	2	"Twin Some, Lose Some"	March 22, 2016	0.508
239	3	"Release the Beast and Other Tall Tales"	March 29, 2016	0.620
240	4	"No Room for T.H.O.T.S."	April 5, 2016	0.487
241	5	"A Family Affair (& other tall tales) Part Deux"	April 12, 2016	0.519
242	6	"Recipe for Disaster"	April 19, 2016	0.636
243	7	"Birthday Blowout"	April 26, 2016	0.599
244	8	"OG Overthrow"	May 3, 2016	0.573
245	9	"Bids, Breakthroughs and Barbecues"	May 10, 2016	0.614
246	10	"Five Dollar Farewell"	May 17, 2016	0.608
247	11	"Reunion: Part 1"	May 24, 2016	0.701
248	12	"Reunion: Part 2"	May 31, 2016	0.592
249	13	"Reunion: Part 3"	June 7, 2016	0.556

=== Season 16 (2016) ===
No. overall	No. in season	Title	Original release date	Viewers (millions)
250	0	"Casting Special"	September 13, 2016	0.221
251	1	"#LikeItOrNah"	September 20, 2016	0.524
252	2	"#shabully"	September 27, 2016	0.551
253	3	"#FriendorFoe"	October 4, 2016	0.481
254	4	"GANG GANG #GONE"	October 11, 2016	0.601
255	5	"#GERMWARFARE"	October 25, 2016	0.514
256	6	"Welcome To #KANDYLAND"	November 1, 2016	0.498
257	7	"#helloGOODBYE"	November 8, 2016	0.628
258	8	"#shadesofgay"	November 15, 2016	0.482
259	9	"#LoveGoneBad"	November 22, 2016	0.579
260	10	"#SHABYE"	November 29, 2016	0.611
261	11	"Reunion: Part 1"	December 6, 2016	0.709
262	12	"Reunion: Part 2"	December 13, 2016	0.804

=== Season 17 (2017) ===
No. overall	No. in season	Title	Original release date	Viewers (millions)
263	0	"Casting Special"	February 7, 2017	0.180
264	1	"Coastal Clash"	February 14, 2017	0.323
265	2	"See Ya Later, INSTIgator"	February 21, 2017	0.412
266	3	"24 Hours in the BGC"	February 28, 2017	0.338
267	4	"Squad Goals"	March 7, 2017	0.410
268	5	"Blonde Sided"	March 14, 2017	0.411
269	6	"Strike Up a Match"	March 21, 2017	0.504
270	7	"Balls to the Wall"	March 28, 2017	0.428
271	8	"Swimming With Sharks"	April 4, 2017	0.389
272	9	"Sin City Showdown"	April 11, 2017	0.432
273	10	"The Final Countdown"	April 18, 2017	0.501
274	11	"Reunion: Part 1"	April 25, 2017	0.634
275	12	"Reunion: Part 2"	May 2, 2017	0.535
