= Shannon and Shannade Clermont =

American television personalities and models

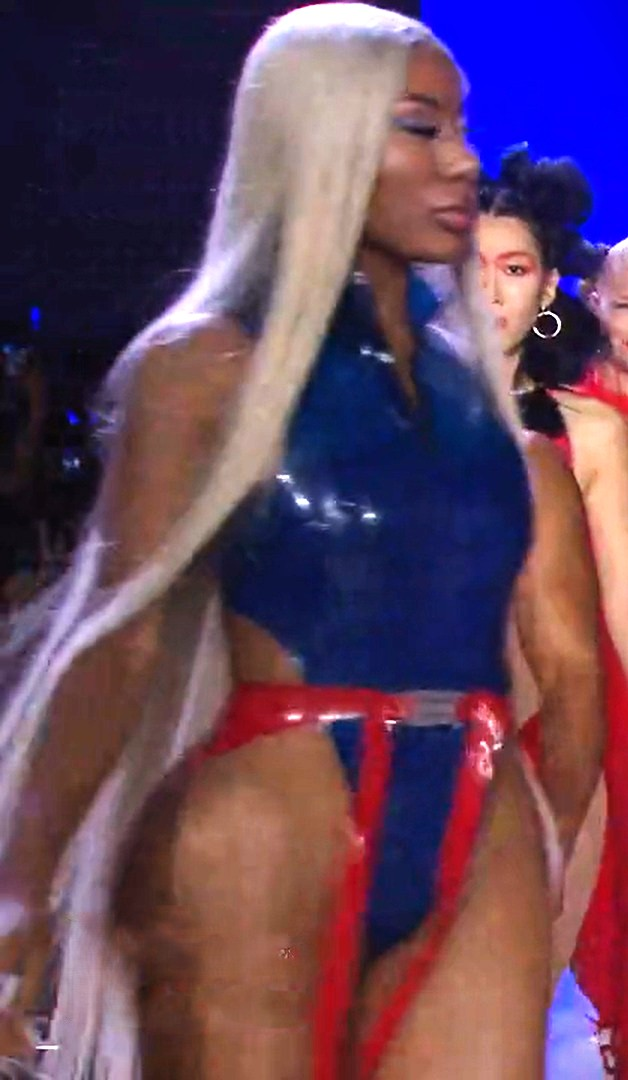
- Shannon Clermont walks for Chromat at New York Fashion Week 2020.
- Born: March 21, 1994 (age 32); Montclair, New Jersey, U.S.
- Other name: Clermont twins
- Education: Fashion Institute of Technology (Shannon); Parsons School of Design (Shannade)
- Occupations: Models; fashion designers; television personalities
- Years active: 2008–present
- Website: theclermonttwins.com

Shannade and Shannon Clermont (born March 21, 1994), also known as the Clermont Twins, are American models, fashion designers, reality television stars and escorts. They are best known for their appearance on the fourteenth season of Oxygen's hit reality television series, Bad Girls Club in 2015.

== Early lives ==
The Clermont twins were born in Montclair, New Jersey, on March 21, 1994. They are the youngest of five siblings, with one sister and two brothers. They relocated to Dallas, Georgia when they were nine years old and began modeling at the age of fourteen.

The twins developed an interest in fashion from their aunt, a fashion designer in New York City.

Despite both receiving full college scholarships in Georgia, Shannade attended Parsons School of Design for strategic design and Shannon attended the Fashion Institute of Technology for fashion merchandising. They have since relocated to Los Angeles, California.

== Television careers ==
The Clermont twins began their television career after winning a six-month program at an acting and modeling school, which led them to working as stand-ins for various television shows, including Tyler Perry's House of Payne.

In 2015, the Clermont twins appeared as cast members on the fourteenth season of Oxygen's hit reality television series Bad Girls Club. They were removed from the show in the seventh episode, after an altercation occurred involving other cast members destroying their personal belongings. This led to the twins and fellow cast member Jelaminah Lanier filing a lawsuit against the Oxygen network. Shannon has since stated they only took part in the show because they wanted to be known on a "national level", and claimed they would never do the show again.

In 2024, the twins made guest appearances on Zeus Network's web series Baddies Caribbean.

== Modeling careers ==
The twins began modeling in late 2015 for the fall 2015 Married to the Mob collection. They launched their Mont Boudoir fashion label in 2017, they successfully relaunched the brand in 2020. They acknowledged Ashley and Mary-Kate Olsen as being among their inspirations for their collections. They had previously interned for fashion labels including Jovani and Yves Saint Laurent.

The Clermont twins' public profile significantly increased after they were featured in Kanye West's Yeezy Season 6 collection in January 2018, alongside Paris Hilton. They were unaware of West and Kim Kardashian's interest in their participation until the day before the campaign was shot.

In June, they released a nude photo shoot hugging each other, alongside a separate nude photoshoot released during the airing of Bad Girls Club, which showed the twins pressing their tongues together, sparking incest accusations.

The twins modeled for Gypsy Sport during New York Fashion Week in 2018. In January 2019, they walked together for The Blonds and in September 2019, Shannon walked independently for Chromat.

The twins have appeared as models in several music videos for artists including Future, Nicki Minaj, Travis Scott, and Wiz Khalifa.

== Legal issues ==
On July 11, 2018, Shannade Clermont was arrested and charged with aggravated identity theft, access device fraud, and conspiracy to commit wire fraud. Despite not being suspected for involvement in the death of Manhattan-based real estate broker James Alesi, while working as an escort, she was investigated after Alesi's account information was connected to money transfers and purchases, including account sign-ups to zoophilia websites, made by Clermont after his death. She pleaded guilty in November and was sentenced to one year in prison in April 2019.

Clermont turned herself in to FCI Dublin on June 4, 2019. She was released early on March 9, 2020.

Her lawyer, Jeffrey Lichtman, stated that the twins began the Clermont Foundation for mental health support after Shannade experienced suicidal thoughts stemming from her legal proceedings.

== Personal lives ==
The twins share two Yorkshire Terrier dogs named Chase and Chloe, which they rotate between their apartments so the dogs are not separated.

After their appearance on Bad Girls Club, the twins became victims of online trolling due to their drastic plastic surgery.

== Filmography ==
Television
Year	Title	Role	Notes
2015	Bad Girls Club season 14: Back for More	Self; cast members	7 episodes
2024	Baddies season 5: Caribbean	Self; guests	3 episodes, web series

Music videos
Year	Title	Artist	Role
2012	Same Damn Time	Future	Models
2015	Real Sisters	Future	Models
2018	Gin and Drugs	Wiz Khalifa	Models
2018	Good Form	Nicki Minaj	Human chairs
2023	Topia Twins	Travis Scott featuring 21 Savage and Rob49	Models
