= Jonathan Daviss =

American actor (born 2000)

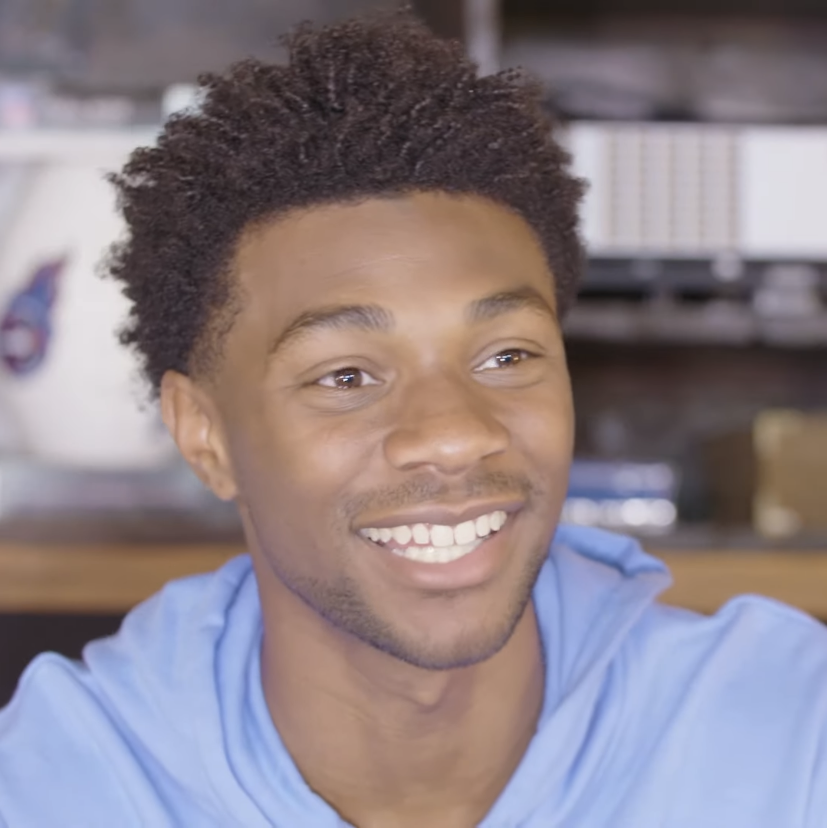
- Daviss in 2021
- Born: February 28, 2000 (age 26); Nashville, Tennessee, U.S.
- Occupation: Actor
- Years active: 2013–present
- Agent: Creative Artists Agency

Jonathan Pierce Daviss (born February 28, 2000), also known simply as J.D. or JD, is an American actor. He starred as Pope Heyward in the Netflix drama series Outer Banks.

== Early life ==
Daviss was raised in Conroe, Texas, and attended Conroe High School, where he played football and participated in Speech and Debate. He has a younger sister. Following high school, his mother sold their house, and they moved to California for him to pursue an acting career.

== Career ==
Signed for representation at CAA March 2026. It was revealed at the CinemaCon 2026 that Daviss was slated to star as Snoop Dogg in an upcoming biopic Snoop for Universal Pictures with Craig Brewer directing.

== Filmography ==
=== Film ===
Year	Title	Role	Notes
2014	Deliverance Creek	Samuel Washington	TV movie
2017	All the Marbles	Young Spike	Short
2018	Edge of the World	Jay Tibbs	
2018	Age of Summer	Mathis	
2018	Shattered Memories	Teddy	TV movie
2022	Do Revenge	Elliot	Netflix film
2027	Snoop	Calvin "Snoop Dogg" Broadus	Universal Pictures

=== Television ===
Year	Title	Roles	Notes
2013	Revolution	Kid	One episode
2020−2026	Outer Banks	Pope Heyward	Main cast
2020	Baselines	Lavar	Post Production
