= Camilla Poindexter =

American actress and model

- Born: August 30, 1986 (age 40); Long Beach, California, U.S.
- Occupations: Reality television star, model
- Years active: 2008-present
- Television: Bad Girls Club season 8, Love Games: Bad Girls Need Love Too season 4, Bad Girls All Star Battle, House of Villains
- Children: 3

Camilla Poindexter is an American reality television star and model, she is best known for her appearance on season eight of Oxygen network's hit reality show, Bad Girls Club. She was also the runner-up on the fourth season of Bad Girls Club spin-off Love Games: Bad Girls Need Love Too, and was a contestant on the second season of Bad Girls All Star Battle. In 2014 she was a cast member on Bad Girls Club season 13 Redemption. In 2025 Poindexter starred in E! network's House of Villains season 2.

== Early life ==
Poindexter was born and raised in Long Beach, California. She studied broadcasting in hopes to become a television host and spokesmodel, abandoning her earlier aspirations of being a doctor or lawyer.

== Modeling career ==
In 2008, Poindexter appeared as a contestant on America's Next Top Model Cycle 10. In 2011, she made a cameo appearance as a model in an episode of The Real Housewives of Orange County.

In 2015, Poindexter posed for King Magazine.

== Television career ==
Poindexter's first reality television appearance was as a contestant on NBC's Momma's Boys in 2008, where she was eliminated in the season finale. She also appeared as a contestant on America's Next Top Model Cycle 10, where she placed in the top 20.

In 2012, Poindexter was a replacement on Oxygen network's hit reality show; Bad Girls Club season 8: Las Vegas. She entered the show in the eleventh episode alongside cast member Christine Moon, replacing Danielle & Gabrielle Victor. Poindexter only appeared in three episodes, being removed in the season finale after multiple physical altercations with fellow cast members Amy Cieslowski, Demitra Roche, Elease Donovan and Erica Figueroa.

Despite this, she quickly became the season eight fan favorite. During one of her altercations Poindexter coined the catchphrase "I'm not the one!". She called her mother during a physical altercation, to which her mother could be heard yelling through the phone "Whoop that ass Camilla!". Poindexter appeared in the three reunion special episodes.

In 2012, Poindexter starred in Bad Girls Club spin-off Love Games: Bad Girls Need Love Too season 4. She featured in all episodes, coming in second place, losing to former season eight cast member, Amy Cieslowski. She famously punched cast member Taylor Fortinberry in the face, causing his nose to bleed.

Poindexter began to co-host the Bad Girls Club Making it to the Mansion casting specials, for seasons 10 Atlanta, 11 Miami and 12 Chicago, alongside Bad Girl alumni, Natalie Nunn. She co-hosted the casting special for the fifteenth season, Twisted Sisters.

In 2013, she co-hosted the Bad Girls Club seasons 6-10 OMG Moments special and Bad Girls Club: Funniest Bad Girls of All Time in 2014. In 2013, she starred in a Smurfs 2 commercial alongside Tanisha Thomas.

Poindexter was a contestant on the second season of Bad Girls Club spin-off, Bad Girls All Star Battle. She was eliminated in the sixth episode, placing tenth overall. She appeared in the two part reunion special.

In 2014, Poindexter was a cast member on the thirteenth season of the Bad Girls Club, Redemption. The season featured an all-stars cast, back to redeem their past bad behaviors. She featured in all episodes and all three reunion special episodes. During the show she engaged in feuds with cast members Jada Cacchilli, Julie Ofcharsky, Raquel Santiago, Rimanelli Mellal and most famously, her former friend Natalie Nunn.

In 2023, Poindexter featured in Zeus Network's, reality series, Baddies East. She appeared in all episodes, aside from the final part of the reunion special.

In 2024, Poindexter was a contestant on the second season of E! Network's, House of Villains. Poindexter placed ninth, featuring in six episodes.

== Personal life ==
Poindexter has three children. One of her children is with NFL football player, Donald Penn.

== Filmography ==
=== Film and television ===
Year	Title	Role	Notes
2008	Momma's Boys	Self; contestant	6 episodes
2008	Bedtime Stories	Extra	
2008	America's Next Top Model Cycle 10	Self; contestant	1 episode, Top 20
2008-2009	The Game	Extra	2 episodes
2011	The Real Housewives of Orange County	Model	1 episode
2011	Friends With Benefits	Cake mix girl	
2012	Bad Girls Club season 8: Las Vegas	Self; replacement	6 episodes
2012	Love Games: Bad Girls Need Love Too season 4	Self; contestant	Runner-up, 9 episodes
2012	The Eric Andre Show	Self; guest	1 episode
2013	Bad Girls Club season 10: Atlanta	Self; co-host	Making it to the Mansion casting special
2013	Bad Girls Club Top 10 OMG Moments 6-10	Self; co-host	TV special
2013	Bad Girls Club season 11: Miami	Self; co-host	Making it to the Mansion casting special
2014	Bad Girls All Star Battle season 2	Self; contestant	10th place, 9 episodes
2014	Bad Girls Club: Funniest Bad Girls of All Time	Self; co-host	TV special
2014	Bad Girls Club season 12: Chicago	Self; co-host	Making it to the Mansion casting special
2014	Let's Make A Deal	Self; contestant	1 episode
2014	YG: Blame it on the Streets	Sha Sha	Short film
2014	Bad Girls Club season 13: Redemption	Self; original	13 episodes
2015	Apollo Night LA	Self; guest	1 episode
2016	Bad Girls Club season 15: Twisted Sisters	Self; co-host	Making it to the Mansion casting special
2018	Fade Away	Cameo	Short film
2022	I Hear The Sirens	Krista	Short film
2023	Baddies East	Self; cast member	Web series, 22 episodes
2024	House of Villains season 2	Self; contestant	9th place, 6 episodes
2025-2026	Baddies USA	Self; recurring cast member	Web series, 3 episodes
