= Snoop (film) =

- Directed by: Craig Brewer
- Screenplay by: Joe Robert Cole; Craig Brewer
- Produced by: Snoop Dogg; Brian Grazer; Sara Ramaker; Allan Mandelbaum
- Starring: Jonathan Daviss; Myles Bullock; Lauren London; Camron Jones; Algee Smith; Tre Hale; Jonica Booth; Cynthia Erivo; Aaron Paul; Giovanni Ribisi
- Cinematography: Amy Vincent
- Production companies: Death Row Pictures; Imagine Entertainment
- Distributed by: Universal Pictures
- Release date: August 6, 2027
- Country: United States
- Language: English

Snoop is an upcoming American hip-hop biographical drama film depicting the life and career of the rapper Snoop Dogg, directed by Craig Brewer, co-written by Joe Robert Cole, and produced by Dogg, Brian Grazer and Sara Ramaker. It stars Jonathan Daviss in the title role, alongside Myles Bullock, Lauren London, Camron Jones, Algee Smith, Tre Hale, Jonica Booth, Cynthia Erivo, Aaron Paul, and Giovanni Ribisi.

Snoop is scheduled to be released in the United States on August 6, 2027, by Universal Pictures.

== Cast ==
- Jonathan Daviss as Calvin "Snoop Dogg" Broadus
- Myles Bullock as Andre "Dr. Dre" Young
- Lauren London as Beverly Tate
- Camron Jones as Tupac Shakur
- Algee Smith as Warren "Warren G" Griffin III
- Tre Hale as Suge Knight
- Laya DeLeon Hayes as Shante Taylor
- Olly Sholotan as Ricardo "Kurupt" Brown
- Corey Champagne as Nathaniel "Nate Dogg" Hale
- Jonica Booth as Robin "The Lady of Rage" Allen
- Cynthia Erivo as Afeni Shakur
- Aaron Paul as Jimmy Iovine
- Giovanni Ribisi as David Kenner
- SwayvoTwain as Christopher "Biggie Smalls" Wallace/the Notorious B.I.G.
- Bentley Green as Eric "RBX" Collins
- G Perico as Big Reecie Cup
- Hercy Miller as Percy Robert "Master P" Miller
- Zachariah Rogers as Tracy Lynn "The D.O.C" Curry
- Tyquan Givens as B. Mack
- Ice-T

== Production ==
In November 2022, it was announced that a film about the life and career of Snoop Dogg had entered development at Universal Pictures, in partnership with Death Row Pictures, in which he would serve as a producer, alongside Allen Hughes and Sara Ramaker, with Joe Robert Cole writing the screenplay. In June 2025, Craig Brewer had been hired to direct, replacing Hughes, with Jonathan Daviss being cast as Snoop Dogg. In August 2026, Myles Bullock, Lauren London, Camron Jones, Algee Smith, Tre Hale, Laya DeLeon, Olly Sholotan, Corey Champagne, and Jonica Booth were cast as Dr. Dre, Beverly Tate, Tupac Shakur, Warren G, Suge Knight, Shante Taylor, Kurupt, Nate Dogg, and The Lady of Rage. In September, SwayvoTwain, Bentley Green, and G Perico were cast as The Notorious B.I.G., RBX, and Big Reecie Cup. In October, Ice-T announced that he had joined the cast. In November, it was announced that Cynthia Erivo, Aaron Paul, and Giovanni Ribisi joined the cast as Afeni Shakur, Jimmy Iovine and David Kenner.

Principal photography began in mid-September 2026, in Los Angeles.

== Release ==
Snoop is scheduled to be released in the United States on August 6, 2027, by Universal Pictures.
