= Bad Girls Club season 14 =

Bad Girls Club
- Season 14
- The original seven "Bad" Girls of season 14 left to right: Jasmine, Christina, Lauren, Shannon, Shannade, Jelaminah and Kathryn
- No. of episodes: 12

Release
- Original network: Oxygen
- Original release: August 11 – November 3, 2015

Season chronology
- ← Previous; Season 13 Next → Season 15

Bad Girls Club: Back for More is the fourteenth season of the Oxygen reality television series Bad Girls Club. It premiered on August 11, 2015, and concluded on November 3, 2015. It was the seventh season of Bad Girls Club filmed in Los Angeles California. The cast also worked with a life coach, Laura Baron, who has helped multiple girls on previous seasons navigate their way through enternal conflicts, conflicts within the house, and self-growth.

== Residence ==
While filming, the cast lived at 22133 Tulsa Street in the Chatsworth neighborhood of Los Angeles, according to the cast member Jelaminah Lanier. Due to the excessive amount of damage done to the residence, Oxygen producers were forced to reuse the house for the following season, Bad Girls Club: Twisted Sisters. The property was once owned by the Spice Girls member Mel B.

== Cast ==
=== Original Bad Girls ===
Name	Age	Hometown	Nickname
Christina "Tina" Aviles	22	Queens, New York	The Sultry Showstopper
Jasmine Carter	21	Chicago, Illinois	The Southside Slugger
Jelaminah "Jela" Lanier	25	Houston, Texas	The Houston Hustler
Kathryn "Kat" Florek	23	Zion, Illinois	The Lusty Loudmouth
Lauren Lewis	23	Covington, Georgia	The Red Hot Redneck
Shannade Clermont (Note: Shannade and Shannon are twins.)	20	Montclair, New Jersey	The Power Princess
Shannon Clermont	20	Montclair, New Jersey	The Uptown Princess

=== Replacement Bad Girls ===
Name	Age	Hometown	Nickname	Replaced
Jenna Charland	22	Albany, New York	The Queen of Trash Talk	Christina
Beatrice "Ginger" Miller	21	Yonkers, New York	The Red Headed Rebel	Shannon
Amber Zadora	21	Philadelphia, Pennsylvania	The Dolled Up Dynamite	Shannade
Alicia "Ally" Ramsdell	22	Atlanta, Georgia	The Bad Ass Beauty Queen	Jelaminah

=== Duration of cast ===
Bad Girl	Episodes									
Bad Girl	1	2	3	4	5	6	7	8	9	10
Jasmine	Featured									
Kat	Featured									
Lauren	Featured									
Jela	Featured						removed (Note: Jelaminah, Shannade and Shannon were removed from the house after a physical altercation with Kat, Jenna and Lauren, threatening production and destroying the house in anger of finding their items destroyed and scattered around the house.)			
Shannade	Featured						removed (Note: Jelaminah, Shannade and Shannon were removed from the house after a physical altercation with Kat, Jenna and Lauren, threatening production and destroying the house in anger of finding their items destroyed and scattered around the house.)			
Shannon	Featured						removed (Note: Jelaminah, Shannade and Shannon were removed from the house after a physical altercation with Kat, Jenna and Lauren, threatening production and destroying the house in anger of finding their items destroyed and scattered around the house.)			
Tina	Featured			Left (Note: Christina voluntarily left the house after Jelaminah placed her belongings outside.)						
Jenna					Entered (Note: Jenna replaced Christina.)	Featured				
Amber							Entered (Note: Amber and Beatrice replaced Shannon and Shannade respectively.)	Featured		
Beatrice							Entered (Note: Amber and Beatrice replaced Shannon and Shannade respectively.)	Featured		
Ally								Entered (Note: Alicia replaced Jelaminah.)	Left (Note: Alicia voluntarily left the house after multiple altercations with Jasmine and Lauren.)	

== Episodes ==
No. overall	No. in season	Title	Original release date	Viewers (millions)
223	0	"BGC XIV: Casting Sneak Peek"	August 4, 2015	0.532
224	1	"Once Upon a Turnt Up Time"	August 11, 2015	0.615
The Bad Girls meet each other and alliances are quickly formed. A surprised seventh girl shocks and confuses the house. Drama erupts about everything from cigarettes to baby daddies. One Bad Girl embarrasses everyone else.
225	2	"Double Trouble"	August 18, 2015	0.561
Battle lines are drawn when Lauren becomes fed up with Jela and the twins. Tina starts to be bothered on her boyfriends poor amusement while she is gone. Meanwhile, Jasmine's insecurities come to light, leading everyone to wonder where her true loyalty lies. Life coach Laura returns to the house to help the girls.
226	3	"Birthday Ho-Down"	August 25, 2015	0.636
The girls attempt to draw out Kat's inner bad girl. Meanwhile, the twins celebrate their birthday with some "cops". Jela and Lauren start arguing about Lauren saying a swear word from a song, not meaning to be racist, but Jela thought she was, sparking a physical altercation between the two.
227	4	"Flirting With Kat-Tastrophe"	September 1, 2015	0.827
Jasmine celebrates her birthday, but things quickly turn sour when she starts arguing with her friends about a mistake she made. After thinking Jasmine was in the wrong, Shannon gets annoyed turning their limo ride home physical. The girls have their photo shoot, sparking a heated altercation between the twins and Jela. Jela makes it her mission to kick one of the peasants out of the house. Note: Tina voluntarily leaves the house.
228	5	"Return to Sender"	September 8, 2015	0.690
A new girl, Jenna, comes into the house sparking tension between her, the twins and Jela, leading to a limo altercation between the twins and Jenna. After Jela locks Jenna out of the house she has some words for her, leading to multiple physical altercations between them both. Still dealing with her insecurities, Kat realizes that she needs to figure out what she wants most from the Bad Girls Club. Note: Jenna replaces Tina.
229	6	"The Keys to Happiness"	September 15, 2015	0.477
Jasmine's plan to conduct a seance in the house does not sit well with some of the other girls. Laura comes to give much needed insight, resulting in an emotional Jenna and Lauren; The girls volunteer for a homeless charity; Lauren, Jenna, and Kat comfort Jasmine after she has a big breakdown, following a one-night stand.
230	7	"A Royal Tumble"	September 29, 2015	0.642
The twins and Jela decide to leave the other girls at home to go out to the club without any arguments. After Lauren, Jasmine, Kat and Jenna destroy their things, this leads to an epic physical altercation and leading to the twins and Jela to destroy the house, ending their time in the bad girls club. Lauren and Jenna pick up guys in order to alleviate Jasmine's guilt about hooking up with Mike. Two new girls, Ginger and Amber, arrive in the house. Notes: Jela, Shannon and Shannade are removed from the house. Amber and Ginger replace Shannade and Shannon.
231	8	"Twerking for Change"	October 6, 2015	0.709
Lauren lets the other girls know that she is very familiar with the new girl, Ally. After Ally annoys Jasmine and Lauren, they decide to try and kick her out of the house, which backfires. Note: Ally replaces Jela.
232	9	"Bye Bye Baby"	October 13, 2015	0.501
After Ally becomes irate with everyone and their bullying ways, she decides that she no longer wants to be in the bad girls house. Knowing that the girls were invited to a yacht party, Ally goes home, but not without a bang. Note: Ally voluntarily leaves the house.
233	10	"Going Bye With A Bang"	October 20, 2015	0.521
Jenna and Kat confront Lauren and Jasmine about what happened with Ally. Former season 12 Bad Girls Loren and Jonica make an appearance. Ginger decides to spend the night with Jonica, angering Kat. Amber decides to stick up for Ginger, following an argument in the limo, leading to a physical altercation between Kat and Amber. The girls say their goodbyes to the Bad Girls Club and Los Angeles.
234	11	"Reunion: Part 1"	October 27, 2015	0.705
The episode starts with all the girls (minus the twins who were not allowed at the reunion) meeting up with each other and discussing their game plans. After Lauren and Jasmine bring out mannequins of the twins, Amber, Ginger and Ally have things to say to the other girls, sparking a heated argument between Ally and Tanisha. The episode ends with a cliffhanger between a fight with Ginger and Kat.
235	12	"Reunion: Part 2"	November 3, 2015	0.838
The episode starts with Beatrice and Kat fighting. Jela comes out on the stage coming at everyone who ruined her and the twins' clothes leading to her punching Kat in the face. The girls officially say goodbye to Los Angeles.
