= Bad Girls Club =

American reality television series

- Genre: Reality television
- Created by: Mary-Ellis Bunim; Jonathan Murray
- Opening theme: "Love Me or Hate Me" by Lady Sovereign (season 1); "Bad Girls" by Tokyo Diiva (seasons 2–4); "Bad Girls" (remix) by Tokyo Diiva (seasons 5–15); "Bad Girls Anthem" by unknown artist (seasons 16–17)
- Country of origin: United States
- Original language: English
- No. of seasons: 17
- No. of episodes: 275 (list of episodes)

Production
- Executive producers: Jonathan Murray; Gil Goldschein; Maria Pepin; Troy Vanderheyden
- Camera setup: Multiple
- Running time: 20–22 minutes (seasons 1–2); 40–43 minutes (seasons 3–17)
- Production company: Bunim/Murray Productions

Original release
- Network: Oxygen
- Release: December 5, 2006 – May 2, 2017

Related
- Bad Girls Road Trip; Tanisha Gets Married; Love Games: Bad Girls Need Love Too; Bad Girls All-Star Battle; Baddies

Bad Girls Club (abbreviated BGC) is a 2006 American reality television series created by Jonathan Murray for the Oxygen network in the United States. The show focused on the altercations and physical confrontations of seven aggressive, quarrelsome, unruly women. They were featured on the show as "charismatic tough chicks." The cast, deemed "bad girls," enjoyed a luxurious lifestyle in a mansion for three months, during which they obeyed specified rules. Their lives inside and outside the house were recorded by a production team.

Bad Girls Club aired on at least seven networks in other countries: Sky Living in the United Kingdom and Ireland, MTV in Australia, New Zealand and Russia, RTL 5 in the Netherlands, TV11 in Sweden, SIC Radical in Portugal, Velvet in the Philippines, and Channel [V] in Southeast Asia. If a cast member violated production rules, she was evicted from the show and often replaced. The fourth season was the series' "breakthrough season" as Oxygen's first series to average over one million viewers per episode.

There were four spin-offs, including Bad Girls Road Trip, Tanisha Gets Married, Love Games: Bad Girls Need Love Too, and Bad Girls All-Star Battle. In late 2016, Bad Girls Club was renewed for a 17th season, Bad Girls Club: East Meets West. In February 2017, the series' future was put in limbo with the network's announcement that it would convert to a true crime programming format, which was instituted in July 2017. Of the series' future, NBCUniversal Cable Entertainment Lifestyle Networks president Frances Berwick said, "Bad Girls Club, at this stage, I don't see it on Oxygen linear," suggesting that it could air in a non-linear media form. "Beyond that, we haven't figured it out yet."

In October 2026, a reunion special for the seventh season of the show was announced for Fandango hosted by Tanisha Thomas. That same month Bunim/Murray Productions announced the auditions for a new Bad Girls Club spinoff show, Bad Girls Club: Battle of the Baddest, a competition-style show from the likes of Bad Girls All Star Battle.

== Format ==
The format of the first season of Bad Girls Club differs from subsequent seasons, but its rules apply in all subsequent seasons. One feature continued from season one was the way the show opened: viewers were shown the biggest and most intense physical altercation of the season, and the program then went back to a time before it happened. This fight usually gives the viewer an idea of who is going to be the baddest, or one of the baddest, girls in the house. This altercation draws in many viewers and keeps them wondering what will happen next.

In the second season, the show's format changed drastically. The maximum age dropped from 31 to 28. The cast of season two were given mandatory nonprofit jobs to help them build a work ethic and experience the stabilizing effect of being interdependent with others, for example in teamwork and commitment, to equip them for success in later life. Quitting the job or failure to attend resulted in removal from the show. The girls were given the jobs of planning, decision making, and building cooperation. Season two was the first and only season of the Bad Girls Club to do this, and also the last to air 30-minute episodes.

The Bad Girls Club creed, introduced in season three, is:

A Bad Girl knows what she wants and how to get it. She makes her own way, makes her own rules and she makes no apologies. A Bad Girl blazes her own trail and removes obstacles from her path. A Bad Girl fights and forces her way to the top with style and beauty. A Bad Girl believes in jumping first and looking later. People will love you. People will hate you. Others will secretly wish to be you. A Bad Girl is you.

The bad girls typically form cliques, create havoc, book parties in night clubs, and engage in sexual antics while attempting to maintain their personal lives. They come from different backgrounds. Earlier in the series, they try to cope and adjust their behavior to become role models for young women. Some cast members try to accomplish specific goals. Throughout, the bad girls must adapt to their housemates' moods and behavioral changes. They interview in reality TV confessionals. They are allowed to contact their families and friends on landline telephones and a computer connected to a large-screen television, but prohibited from watching nationally and locally televised programming or using mobile phones.

If cast members engage in violence or break other rules, they are considered for eviction under the show's policy, which is enforced by the producers. Security guards and production crew members intervene in violent altercations. Other reasons for departure include bullying, ostracism, alienation from other housemates, problems at home, or court proceedings. Multiple bad girls leave in every season. If a bad girl departs early in the season, a replacement arrives within one or two episodes. Replacement housemates are commonly hazed.

In August 2010, during the OxygenLive TV recap episode, the show combined Facebook and Twitter with a live broadcast. Fans submitted opinions and comments about the show and its cast, which aired during the 10 pm hour. In January 2011, Oxygen released OxygenLive!, an online talk show hosted by Tanisha Thomas, one of the bad girls of season two. It was broadcast after season six debuted on Oxygen, and focused on the cast of season six, occasionally bringing in bad girls from earlier seasons. Thomas asked the girls several questions to prompt rumors and confessions.

== List of cast members ==
Indicates replacement bad girl

Season	Name	Nickname	Age (Note: Age at time of filming)	Hometown
1	Aimee Landi	—N/a	24	South Philadelphia, Pennsylvania
1	Hripsime "Ripsi" Terzian	—N/a	23	Watertown, Massachusetts
1	Jodie Howell	—N/a	29	Columbia, Maryland
1	Kerry Harvick	—N/a	31	Nashville, Tennessee
1	Leslie Ramsue	—N/a	24	Atlanta, Georgia
1	Tyla "Ty" Colliers	—N/a	25	Alpharetta, Georgia
1	Zara Sprankle	—N/a	22	Cicero, New York
1	DeAnn Witt	—N/a	24	McKinney, Texas
1	Joanna "JoJo" Hernandez	—N/a	23	Sacramento, California
1	Andrea Laing	—N/a	26	High Point, North Carolina
2	Cordelia Carlisle	—N/a	22	Wallingford, Connecticut
2	Darlen Escobar	—N/a	24	Austin, Texas
2	Hanna Thompson	—N/a	22	Brooklyn, New York
2	Jennavecia Russo	—N/a	26	Las Vegas, Nevada
2	Melissa "Lyric" Greene	—N/a	22	Phoenix, Arizona
2	Neveen Ismail	—N/a	24	Portland, Oregon
2	Tanisha Thomas	—N/a	21	Flatbush, New York
2	Andrea Sharples	—N/a	22	Portland, Oregon
3	Ailea Carr	The Instigator	21	Buford, Georgia
3	Amber Buhl	The Narcissist	23	Pittsburgh, Pennsylvania
3	Amber "Cookie" Meade	The Firecracker	25	Montevideo, Minnesota
3	Kayla "KC" Carter	The Loose Cannon	23	Compton, California
3	Sarah Michaels	The Party Girl	23	Milwaukee, Wisconsin
3	Tiffany "Tiff" Torrence-Davis	The Warden	24	Chicago, Illinois
3	Whitney Collings	The Straight Shooter	21	Boston, Massachusetts
3	Ashley Weaver	The Female Fatale	21	Seattle, Washington
4	Amber McWha	The Trash Talker	23	Morgantown, West Virginia
4	Annie Andersen	The Control Freak	25	Los Angeles, California
4	Florina "Flo" Kaja	The Enforcer	26	New Dorp, New York
4	Kate Squillace	The Prima Donna	23	Gloucester, Massachusetts
4	Kendra James	The Double Standard	22	Charlotte, North Carolina
4	Natalie Nunn	The Socialite	24	Oakland, California
4	Portia Beaman	The Pistol	24	Kansas City, Missouri
4	Lexie Woltz	The Wild Child	21	Belleville, Illinois
5	Brandi "Venus" Arceneaux	The Sneaky Stripper	26	Inglewood, California
5	Catya "Cat" Washington	The Elite Player	24	Philadelphia, Pennsylvania
5	Danielle Rosario	The Scrapper	21	Massapequa, New York
5	Erica Langston	The Trash Talking Cheerleader	25	Anaheim, California
5	Kristen Guinane	The Pageant Princess	23	Manchester-by-the-Sea, Massachusetts
5	Lea Beaulieu	The South Beach Rebel	22	South Beach, Florida
5	Morgan Osman	The Uber Bitch	21	Miami Beach, Florida
5	Kayleigh Severn	The Kung Fu Diva	22	San Diego, California
5	Ashley Cheatham	The Southern Belle	21	Houston, Texas
5	Christina Hopkins	Agent Orange	22	Richmondtown, New York
6	Charmaine "Char" Warren	The C.E.B a.k.a. Chief Executive Bitch	27	Chicago, Illinois
6	Jade Bennett	The Party Diva	22	Milwaukee, Wisconsin
6	Jessica Rodriguez	The Mouth	22	Chicago, Illinois
6	Kori Koether	Botox Barbie	21	Phoenix, Arizona
6	Lauren Spears	The Southern Spitfire	21	Lexington, Kentucky
6	Nicole "Nikki" Galladay	The Prankster	22	Annandale, New Jersey
6	Sydney Steinfeldt	The Sexy Siren	21	Dallas, Texas
6	Ashley King	The Bombshell	21	Norfolk, Virginia
6	Jennifer "Jenn" Buonagurio	The Jersey Princess	21	Fair Lawn, New Jersey
6	Wilmarie "Wilma" Sena	Rough Rider	27	Passaic, New Jersey
7	Angelic "Angie" Castillo	The Bronx Bombshell	21	South Bronx, New York
7	Judith "Judi" Jackson	The Voodoo Vixen	21	Olympia Fields, Illinois
7	Nastasia "Stasi" Townsend	The Powerhouse	23	Huntington Beach, California
7	Priscilla Mennella	The Staten Island Spitfire	25	New Springville, New York
7	Shelly Hickman	The Lady Killer	23	Wentzville, Missouri
7	Tasha Malek	The Posh Princess	23	Miami, Florida
7	Tiara Hodge	The Goofy Gangsta	22	Gary, Indiana
7	Cheyenne Evans	The Texas Vixen	22	Round Rock, Texas
8	Amy Cieslowski	The Hot Mess	23	Chicago, Illinois
8	Danielle "Danni" Victor	The Black Sheep	23	Methuen, Massachusetts
8	Demitra "Mimi" Roche	The Miami Maverick	25	Miami, Florida
8	Erica Figueroa	The Red-Headed Hustler	23	Atlanta, Georgia
8	Gabrielle "Gabi" Victor	The Queen B	23	Methuen, Massachusetts
8	Gia Sapp-Hernandez	The Scandalous School Girl	22	Newark, Delaware
8	Jenna Russo	The Naughty New Yorker	24	Wantagh, New York
8	Elease Donovan	The Brick House	24	Miami, Florida
8	Christine Moon	The Tennessee Temptation	23	Nashville, Tennessee
8	Camilla Poindexter	The Cali Cutthroat	24	Long Beach, California
9	Ashley Dye	The Platinum Party Girl	21	Bartlett, Illinois
9	Christina Salgado	The Sultry Spitfire	21	Jersey City, New Jersey
9	Erika Jordan	The Boss Bitch	23	Chicago, Illinois
9	Falen Ghirmai	The D.C. Celebrity	25	Fairfax, Virginia
9	Julie Ofcharsky	The Devious Diva	23	Boston, Massachusetts
9	Mehgan James	The Texas Temptation	21	Texas City, Texas
9	Rimanelli "Rima" Mellal	The Wild Child	22	Chicago, Illinois
9	Andrea "Drea" Jones	The Pin-Up Princess	27	Bethpage, New York
9	Zuly Ramos	The Caribbean Cassanova	28	Tampa, Florida
9	Natasha Smoot	The Spunky Spitfire	21	Monroe, New York
10	Alicia Samaan	Ms. Chi-Fly	24	Bolingbrook, Illinois
10	Janae Bradford	The Houston Hellraiser	23	Houston, Texas
10	Nicole "Nicky" Vargas	The Jersey Joker	22	Fort Lee, New Jersey
10	Paula Hellens	Hell On Heels	26	Chicago, Illinois
10	Shannon Sarich	Buff Barbie	26	Hillsboro, Oregon
10	Stephanie "Steph" George	The Harlem Heartbreaker	21	Harlem, New York
10	Valentina Anyanwu	The Sexy Socialite	22	Hyattsville, Maryland
10	Jenniffer "Jenn" Hardwick	The Fun-Loving Firecracker	21	San Bernardino, California
10	Raquel "Rocky" Santiago	The Cali Contender	21	Pine Grove, California
10	Nancy Denise	The Tennessee Toughy	22	Memphis, Tennessee
11	Jazmone "Jaz" Adams	The Misbehavin Model	22	Glendale, California
11	Milyn "Mimi" Jensen	The Star Chaser	24	Los Angeles, California
11	Sarah Oliver	The Bootylicious Blondie	27	Riverdale, Georgia
11	Stephanie "Steph" Rivera	The Sultry Siren	21	New Haven, Connecticut
11	Teresa Bordeaux	The Inked Queen	22	Newark, Ohio
11	Tess Mett	The Rough Rider	21	Louisville, Kentucky
11	Tiana Small	The Harlem Hothead	21	Harlem, New York
11	Gina "Gigi" Lopez	The Brooklyn Baller	23	Brooklyn, New York
11	Shanae "Nae" Thomas	The A-Town Aggressor	21	Atlanta, Georgia
11	Janelle Shanks	The Weave-ologist	22	Houston, Texas
11	Andrea Bowman	The Rhinestone Cowgirl	21	Wichita, Kansas
11	Mercedies "Benze" Webber	The Replacement's Replacement	24	Brooklyn, New York
11	Hailey Wade	The Twerkin' Texan	21	Spring, Texas
12	Alexandria "Slim" Rice	The Hot Model	22	Sherwood, Wisconsin
12	Alyssa "Redd" Carswell	The Luscious Loudmouth	24	Fort Lauderdale, Florida
12	Brittany "Britt" Britton	The Country Hustler	24	Louisville, Kentucky
12	Jada Cacchilli	The Rough Rhymer	28	Queens, New York
12	Jonica "Blu" Booth	The Chick Magnet	25	St. Louis, Missouri
12	Linsey Berardi	The Brooklyn Brat	21	Brooklyn, New York
12	Loren Jordan	The Mobile Belle	23	Mobile, Alabama
12	Aysia Garza	The Texas Temptress	22	Klein, Texas
12	Dalila Ortiz	The Chicago Wild Card	26	Chicago, Illinois
12	Raesha Clanton	The Alabama Slammer	23	Mobile, Alabama
13	Alyssa "Redd" Carswell	—N/a	24	Fort Lauderdale, Florida
13	Camilla Poindexter	—N/a	27	Long Beach, California
13	Danielle "Danni" Victor	—N/a	26	Methuen, Massachusetts
13	Jada Cacchilli	—N/a	28	Queens, New York
13	Judith "Judi" Jackson	—N/a	25	Olympia Fields, Illinois
13	Julie Ofcharsky	—N/a	25	Boston, Massachucetts
13	Natalie Nunn	—N/a	29	Oakland, California
13	Raquel "Rocky" Santiago	—N/a	23	Pine Grove, California
13	Sarah Oliver	—N/a	29	Riverdale, Georgia
13	Rimanelli "Rima" Mellal	—N/a	24	Chicago, Illinois
14	Christina "Tina" Aviles	The Sultry Showstopper	23	Queens, New York
14	Jasmine Carter	The Southside Slugger	21	Chicago, Illinois
14	Jelaminah "Jela" Lanier	The Houston Hustler	25	Houston, Texas
14	Kathryn "Kat" Florek	The Lusty Loudmouth	24	Zion, Illinois
14	Lauren Lewis	The Backwoods Barbie	23	Covington, Georgia
14	Shannade Clermont	The Power Princess	20	Montclair, New Jersey
14	Shannon Clermont	The Uptown Princess	20	Montclair, New Jersey
14	Jenna Charland	The Queen of Trash Talk	22	Albany, New York
14	Amber Zadora	The Dolled Up Dynamite	21	Philadelphia, Pennsylvania
14	Beatrice "Ginger" Miller	The Red Headed Rebel	21	Yonkers, New York
14	Alicia "Ally" Ramsdell	The Bad Ass Beauty Queen	22	Atlanta, Georgia
15	Amber Thorne	The Sultry Siren	26	Houston, Texas
15	Angela Babicz	The Competitive Cutie	25	Clifton, New Jersey
15	Annalisa "Anna" Giordano	The Staten Stunner	23	Arden Heights, New York
15	Asia Jeudy	The Sultry Siren	24	Brooklyn, New York
15	Diamond "Dime" Jimenez	The Swanky Swindler	23	Harlem, New York
15	Jessica Giordano	The Staten Stunner	23	Arden Heights, New York
15	Kristina Babicz	The Competitive Cutie	22	Clifton, New Jersey
15	Olivia "Liv" Adams	The Swanky Swindler	26	Allentown, Pennsylvania
15	Amanda Hepperle	—N/a	28	Guttenberg, New Jersey
15	Victoria Hepperle	—N/a	28	Guttenberg, New Jersey
15	Jaimee Wallace	The Queen of Twerkville	22	Miami, Florida
15	Jazmyn "Jaz" Wallace	The Queen of Twerkville	21	Philadelphia, Pennsylvania
15	Allison Green	The Rock-N-Roll Barbie	24	Las Vegas, Nevada
15	Melissa Green	The Rock-N-Roll Barbie	27	Las Vegas, Nevada
15	Hanan Ibrahim	The Devious Divorcee	24	Covina, California
15	Suha "Susu" Ibrahim	The Devious Divorcee	26	Covina, California
16	Adryan "Ryan" Jones	@RidiculouslyRyan	23	Philadelphia, Pennsylvania
16	Brynesha Seegers	@TaloneMusic	22	Washington, D.C.
16	Elliadria "Persuasian" Griffin	@iampersuasian	25	Dallas, Texas
16	Kaila "Winter" Wilkey	@wiintrr	22	Richmond, California
16	Kailie Lima	@KailieBijou	21	Allenstown, New Hampshire
16	Tabatha Robinson	@DreamDoll__	23	The Bronx, New York
16	Zee Carrino	@lady.westcoast	24	San Jose, California
16	Stephanie Tejada	@StephanieTejadaa	27	Orlando, Florida
16	Kandyce "Kandy" Hogan	@kruel_kandyy	24	Riverdale, Illinois
16	Kabrina Nashayé	@BossyBrina	23	Chicago, Illinois
16	Tiara Nicole	@mytiaranicole	26	Memphis, Tennessee
17	Deshayla "Shay" Harris	The Firecracker Fashionista	22	Norfolk, Virginia
17	Francesca Jacovino	The Rockin' Barbie	22	Torrington, Connecticut
17	Keyaira "Key" Hamilton	The Raging Rapper	26	Compton, California
17	Kiyanna Bygrave	The Mouthy Matchmaker	23	Brooklyn, New York
17	Sayyora Badalbaeva	The Exotic Engima	21	Northridge, California
17	Seven Craft	The Seventh Wonder of the Hood	21	Fort Washington, Maryland
17	Susan Shermann	The Ticking Bombshell	21	Lynnwood, Washington
17	Briana Walker	The High-Rolling Hustler	23	Las Vegas, Nevada

== Critical reception ==
In 2006, Brian Lowry of Variety thought that the producers made the "wrong decision" when they created the show. He believed that the cast of Bad Girls Club auditioned for the show for their "15 minutes of fame". He said that Bad Girls Club "arrived a little late in this game, on a channel lacking the kind of exposure or public footprint to qualify the show even as the stuff guilty pleasures are made of". Lowry believed that the show "loses" and that Oxygen attracts viewers who generally get drunk at bars and make a scene. He also suggested that "maybe it's time to 'BAG' these bad-attitude girls and beat a hasty retreat back to the real world".

In 2006, Anita Gates of The New York Times referred to Bad Girls Club as "a great argument for bringing back programming with actors". She believed that the "average emotional age" appeared to be 15, in contrast to the girls' real ages. She stated that the "unpleasant villains cancel one another out and actually make badness uninteresting", commenting that their behavior might not be "bad enough". Gates concluded by suggesting that Bad Girls Club is the on-location equivalent of The Jerry Springer Show. Kelly West of Cinemablend stated that Bad Girls Club is "so much fun to watch".

In 2011, homophobic slurs caught the attention of media outlets. Adolescents emulated The Bad Girls Club. Mary Mitchell of Sun Times stated that the show was "hazardous to the female psyche" and wrote, "Just like some teens try to emulate rappers in their dress and behavior, the same is true for 'bad girls'." She also commented that the show gives a "distorted picture" of how to live the good life, calling the cast "wannabes" who are "sleeping in a mansion they can't pay for". Mitchell believes that most people know the cast are living "a bogus lifestyle", and assesses the message of the Bad Girls Club as "disturbing".

In 2016, The New York Times released a study of the 50 TV shows with the most Facebook Likes, finding that Bad Girls Club was especially popular in the south, with the greatest popularity in Orangeburg, South Carolina. The show has received negative criticism from African-American viewers, believing that it is "not what being a black woman is all about." Mary Chase Breedlove of Reflector objected that "there are several TV programs devoted to acting as trashy and mean as possible ('Bad Girls' Club, ' ...)". The New York Daily News suggested that Bad Girls Club was the equivalent of professional wrestling. In 2008, Kris De Leon of BuddyTV described the show as "crude, rude and pointless, but sort of addictive to some people."

== Controversies ==
=== Season 4 ===
During "Off the Wall", the first episode of the fourth season, Natalie Nunn told Annie Andersen that Chris Brown was at a night club she wanted to attend, and asked Anderson if she was a fan. Anderson said no, because of the domestic violence case Brown was involved in. Nunn defended Brown, saying "Who cares, Rihanna was a punk bitch, and she got her ass beat for a reason". Nunn called Rihanna a "crazy bitch" and claimed to know her, unlike Anderson. After the episode aired, Brown reportedly said he did not know who Nunn was. Nunn questioned this during the reunion show, claiming that Brown had said it because the cast of the show had not yet been revealed.

Perez Hilton, the host of the reunion, asked Nunn if Rihanna had confronted her about her comments. Nunn said yes, saying that the two had argued during a dinner party in New York City. During the reunion, Nunn claimed to have had a "fling" with Brown before the show. Shortly before the end of the reunion, Nunn said that she did not condone domestic violence and apologized if her comment had enraged fans and people who had been victims of it.

=== Season 5 ===
"I had no idea where I was and [I] had to go to the ER over night. They later discovered someone put PCP in my drink. They can't show it on the show because then that guy could sue for slander. I am honestly really upset they didnt explain that [during] the show. I think its [sic] really messed up how the entire story [wasn't ever] shown [on air], whatever. DONE!"

— Kristen Kelly in 2010 describing an incident that ensued prior to her altercation with Lea.

During the episode "The Wicked Witch of Key West", a stranger at a bar offered to buy drinks for Kristen Guinane and Christina Marie Hopkins. He spiked the drinks with PCP hallucinogenic pills, and Guinane became intoxicated. She claimed to have suffered bruises on her body when the man grabbed her and handled her roughly. Guinane reported that the show's producers did not want to identify the man on television for fear of a lawsuit. She blamed the drug for her hitting cast member Lea Beaulieu in the face, leading to a fight.

After season five wrapped, Catya Washington was sentenced to jail for possession of a concealed weapon and illegal use of drugs.

=== Season 6 ===
During season six production, residents of Sherman Oaks, Los Angeles, complained that noise levels and swearing were unbearable and inappropriate for them and their children to listen to during the night. The residents called local law enforcement agencies four or five times to deal with the late-night disturbances. Clarissa Keller, a Sherman Oaks resident, complained that she had a six-year-old son and did not want him to listen to the swearing. She set up a petition calling for a ban on all production companies in the Sherman Oaks hills.

Location managers and production crew declined to discuss the neighbors' complaints. The Bad Girls Club permit required the entire production to abide by a "minimum outdoor activity and noise" rule, but local residents claimed that the show did not keep noise levels down. The house for season six was rented for $20,000 a month. The owner said that he would not allow this type of production to rent his home in the future.

=== Season 7 ===
On April 12, 2011, cast member Tasha Malek complained to an on-duty police officer outside the Bad Girls house about the conduct of fellow cast member Nastasia Townsend. She claimed that Townsend had placed her personal belongings into a garbage bag, telling her "she needed to leave the house", and that the incident had escalated into a fight. The two were issued summonses by the police for disturbing the peace and disorderly conduct.

Malek released a statement saying "I don't think it's right to be gay", offending many fans of the show.

=== Season 12 ===
The twelfth season of the Bad Girls Club sparked a debate with The Village Board of Trustees of Highland Park, Illinois, who argued against filming the series in the Chicago North Shore suburb.

=== Season 15 ===
During the filming of season 15, "Bad Girls" Amanda and Victoria Hepperle, who are twins, were brought on the show to replace two girls who had left. As the two entered the house, the other cast members pranked them by covering them in flour. The incident later escalated into a fight and the twins left the house and the show. They later filed a lawsuit against the production company, the network, the network's parent company, Atrium Entertainment, the cast members who were on the show at the time of the incident, and 50 unknown individuals. The incident aired on the show but the twins' faces were blurred out.

== Spin-offs ==
=== Love Games: Bad Girls Need Love Too ===
Love Games: Bad Girls Need Love Too premiered on March 16, 2010. The show follows three past bad girls in their search for true love. The first of the Bad Girls Club, Amber Meade and Sarah Michaels from the third season and Kendra Jones from the fourth season. The season concluded on April 27, 2010. Oxygen renewed the show for a second run, with Tanisha Thomas (from season two of the Bad Girls Club) as the host. In this season, Natalie Nunn (season four), Amber Buell (season three) and Lea Beaulieu (season five) competed for true love.

The second season of eight one-hour episodes aired between April 18, 2011, and June 13, 2011. The third season aired on December 5, 2011, with Thomas as host. Kori Koether, Sydney Steinfeldt, and Judi Jai were cast members. Kori Koether and Sydney Steinfeldt were on season six of Bad Girls Club, while Jai was on Season 7. Season 4 aired on November 5, 2012, with Tanisha Thomas as the host. This marked Tanisha's third time being the host in the series. This season also featured Season 8 girls, Danielle "Danni" Victor, Amy Cieslowski, and Camilla Poindexter as the cast members looking for love.

=== Bad Girls All-Star Battle ===
Bad Girls All-Star Battle show features bad girls competing for $100,000 and the title of "Baddest Bad Girl of All Time." The series has the girls divided into two teams, put to the test every week in an array of physical and mental challenges. It is hosted by R&B singer, Ray J. Bad Girls All-Star Battle premiered on May 21, 2013. Bad Girls Club season 10 alumnus Jenniffer "Jenn" Hardwick won the competition, with season 4 alumnus Florina "Flo" Kaja being the runner-up. The second season premiered on January 7, 2014. Season 11 alumnus Tiana Small won the competition, with season 11 alumnus Sarah Oliver being the runner-up.

=== Other spin-offs ===
Bad Girls Road Trip premiered on June 12, 2007. It featured season one cast members Zara Sprankle, Aimee Landi, and Leslie Ramsue touring their respective hometowns in search of casting opportunities for the second season of Bad Girls Club. On the series, they also visited their former housemates.

Bad Girls Club: Flo Gets Married is a one-hour special that centers on season-four cast member Florina "Flo" Kaja, who had a traditional Albanian wedding, and on her pregnancy. It aired on Oxygen on February 28, 2011 and was watched by 859,000 viewers.

A documentary series titled Tanisha Gets Married premiered on May 7, 2012. It follows Bad Girls Club season 2 cast member Tanisha Thomas as she prepares for her wedding. With preparations for the wedding in order, issues arise between Tanisha and her soon-to-be husband Clive. The show covers the family drama that occurs. Former bad girls featured in the series include Natalie Nunn and Florina from season 4, as well as Amber M. from season 3; all appear as bridesmaids. The series also shows how Natalie's and Florina's issues with each other turn violent, and how this affects Tanisha. The series was produced by 495 Productions with SallyAnn Salsano as executive producer.

A webshow, Baddies ATL, produced by former cast members Tanisha Thomas and Natalie Nunn, aired in 2021 consisting of former bad girls.

On October 15, 2026, a two-episode unscripted special titled Bad Girls Club: Unfinished Business was picked up by Fandango, making it the service's first original series. The special will reunite the original cast of Bad Girls Club: New Orleans. Six out of seven cast members Angelic Castillo, Judi Jackson, Nastasia Townsend, Priscilla Mennella, Shelly Hickman, and Tiara Hodge will appear, and it is hosted by Tanisha Thomas.

== Series overview ==
Season	Episodes	Originally released	
Season	Episodes	First released	Last released
1	22	December 5, 2006	June 5, 2007
2	24	December 4, 2007	May 20, 2008
3	15	December 2, 2008	March 31, 2009
4	16	December 1, 2009	March 23, 2010
5	16	August 3, 2010	November 23, 2010
6	15	January 10, 2011	May 9, 2011
7	15	August 1, 2011	November 14, 2011
8	15	January 23, 2012	May 7, 2012
9	16	July 9, 2012	November 5, 2012
10	17	January 15, 2013	May 21, 2013
11	17	August 13, 2013	December 17, 2013
12	17	May 13, 2014	September 9, 2014
13	14	October 7, 2014	January 6, 2015
14	12	August 11, 2015	November 3, 2015
15	13	March 15, 2016	June 7, 2016
16	12	September 13, 2016	December 13, 2016
17	12	February 14, 2017	May 2, 2017
