= Bad Girls Club season 6 =

Bad Girls Club
- Season 6
- The original seven bad girls, from left to right: Nicole, Sydney, Kori, Charmaine, Jessica, Jade, and Lauren
- No. of episodes: 15

Release
- Original network: Oxygen
- Original release: January 10 – May 9, 2011

Season chronology
- ← Previous; Season 5 Next → Season 7

The sixth season of Bad Girls Club is titled Bad Girls Club: Hollywood and premiered on January 10, 2011, on Oxygen. Season 6 was nominated for "Favorite Reality-Show Guilty Pleasure" for the second annual IVillageawards.

== Production ==
Unlike previous seasons where a half-a-year break in production occurred between seasons, casting for the sixth season began simultaneously during production of the Miami season and was filmed several months thereafter, coinciding with the airing of season five. One-on-one interviews with Bunim/Murray Productions were an option from eligible applicants, who needed to include their email, full name, phone number, and a brief biography telling the casting productions what makes them a "bad girl".

Applicants were told to include two recent photos of themselves before submissions, or otherwise the application wouldn't be accepted. The minimum age to apply was 21. Bunim/Murray Productions were also recruiting on Facebook and MySpace, along with a five-minute casting tape to Bunim-Murray Productions. Production for season six began in October 2010 in Sherman Oaks, California, and debuted with 1.71 million viewers, up 25% from the prior season, which earned 1.34 million viewers.

=== Controversy ===
During production of season six, residents from Sherman Oaks complained that noise levels and swearing was extremely unbearable and inappropriate for them and their children to listen to during the night. Residents from Ocean Beach called local enforcements four to five times to defused the corruptions, the girls were showcasing, in the middle of the night. A local Ocean Beach resident complained that she has a six-year-old son and didn't want him to listen to the swearing. She went as far as creating a petition drive to ban all production companies in the Ocean Beach hills.

Location managers and production crew declined to discuss the neighbors complaints. The Bad Girls Club permit announced that the entire production was to abide the "minimum outdoor activity noise" rule. Neighbors stated that the show did not keep noise levels at a low range.

== Residence ==
During filming, the cast lived at 14888 Round Valley Drive in Sherman Oaks, California. The 8,000 sqft "Hollywood themed" home, previously owned by actress Jane Russell, included 8 bedrooms, 6.5 bathrooms and featured a long gated driveway met with a bachelor-pad style exterior with double country western doors. Pigmented on the foyer's twenty-four foot wall read The Bad Girls Club Creed, which was the largest creed of the series thus far, and reviews of the series from publications such as TV Guide, Los Angeles Times, and Salt Lake City Weekly.

The cast photos, which were digital monitors, lined the staircase wall across from the computer area. The dining room was dual purposed as the "hot tub room". The living room was substituted as the game room, featuring a bar, beer pong table, an Olhausen pool table, and an adult claw machine. Also in the game room were entrances to the gym and a purple themed phone room, containing black and white photos of Los Angeles and Melrose Avenue. The master bedroom was converted into the girls' makeup room, where they shared the master closet. The backyard included a swimming pool and cabana.

The tour of season six's mansion was released for public viewing on December 15, 2010 Oxygen's website, and was hosted by production designer Steve Leonhardt several days prior to the arrival of the cast of season six, in September 2010.

== Cast ==
The season began with seven original bad girls. Two left voluntarily and one was removed by production. Three replacement bad girls were introduced in their absences later in the season.

| Name | Age (Note: Age at time of filming) | Hometown | Nickname | Replaced |
|---|---|---|---|---|
| Charmaine "Char" Warren | 27 | Chicago, Illinois | The C.E.B. aka (Chief Executive Bitch) | —N/a |
| Jade Bennett | 21 | Milwaukee, Wisconsin | The Party Diva | —N/a |
| Jessica Rodriguez | 22 | Chicago, Illinois | The Mouth | —N/a |
| Kori Koether | 21 | Phoenix, Arizona | Botox Barbie | —N/a |
| Lauren Spears | 21 | Lexington, Kentucky | The Southern Spitfire | —N/a |
| Nicole "Nikki" Galladay | 22 | Annandale, New Jersey | The Prankster | —N/a |
| Sydney Steinfeldt | 21 | Dallas, Texas | The Sexy Siren | —N/a |
| Ashley King | 21 | Norfolk, Virginia | The Bombshell | Jade |
| Jennifer Buonagurio | 21 | Fair Lawn, New Jersey | The Jersey Princess | Sydney |
| Wilmarie "Wilma" Sena | 27 | Passaic, New Jersey | Rough Rider | Ashley |

=== Duration of Cast ===
| Bad Girl | Episodes | | | | | | | | | | | | |
| Bad Girl | 1 | 2 | 3 | 4 | 5 | 6 | 7 | 8 | 9 | 10 | 11 | 12 | 13 |
|---|---|---|---|---|---|---|---|---|---|---|---|---|---|
| Charmaine | Featured | | | | | | | | | | | | |
| Jessica | Featured | | | | | | | | | | | | |
| Kori | Featured | | | | | | | | | | | | |
| Lauren | Featured | | | | | | | | | | | | |
| Nicole | Featured | | | | | | | | | | | | |
| Sydney | Featured | | | Left (Note: Sydney returns to the house and left the house voluntarily in the same episode after a heated argument with Charmaine.) | | | | | | | | | Appeared (Note: Jade and Sydney made an appearance for a photo shoot with Oxygen.) |
| Jade | Left (Note: Jade left the house voluntarily after multiple altercations with Nikki.) | | | | | | | | | | | | Appeared |
| Ashley | | | Entered (Note: Ashley replaced Jade.) | Featured | | | | removed (Note: Ashley was removed from the house by production after a physical altercation with Kori.) | | | | | |
| Jennifer | | | | | | Entered (Note: Jennifer replaced Sydney.) | Featured | | Left (Note: Jennifer left the house voluntarily after a heated altercation with Wilmarie, Nikki, and Lauren.) | | | | |
| Wilmarie | | | | | | | | Entered (Note: Wilmarie replaced Ashley.) | Featured | | | | removed (Note: Wilmarie was removed from the house by production after multiple physical altercations with Nikki.) |

== Episodes ==
| No. overall | No. in season | Title | Original release date | Viewers (millions) |
|---|---|---|---|---|
| 94 | 1 | "Hotter in Hollywood" | January 10, 2011 | 1.71 |
Seven self-proclaimed "bad girls" are ready to tear up the streets of Hollywood for the sixth installment of the Bad Girls Club. Tempers begin to flare between Nikki and a drunken Jade making her the "weak girl" of the house. Lauren and Jessica go head to head with each other which leads to an altercation. Jade ultimately packs her bags and leaves the "Bad Girls" Mansion. Note: Jade voluntarily leaves the house.
| 95 | 2 | "Broverload" | January 17, 2011 | 1.49 |
Nikki toys with one girl's tolerance levels, leading to Nikki "accidentally" cutting open Kori's hand which send Kori to the hospital.
| 96 | 3 | "Pool Charks" | January 24, 2011 | 1.85 |
Sydney voluntarily leaves the house after a family emergency. Meanwhile, Nikki pushes Char to boiling point, dividing the house and leaving one side at a massive numbers disadvantage. New girl Ashley arrives to the house, leading Nikki to try and swoop Ashley to her side. After Ashley's friends start to try and fight with the roommates, this sparks a huge fight between Ashley, Kori, Nikki and Lauren ending in a shocking cliffhanger. Notes: Ashley replaces Jade. Sydney temporarily leaves the house.
| 97 | 4 | "From Ashes to Clashes" | February 7, 2011 | 1.63 |
The episode picks up with the huge brawl between Ashley and her friends versus the other roommates leading to the cops arriving at the mansion. After realizing that if the girls press charges on Ashley, she could easily press charges back on them, leading to take matters into their own hands. Sydney returns to the house, but leaves again after being sick of Char's antics. Note: Sydney returns to the house, but voluntarily leaves.
| 98 | 5 | "Kentucky Fried and Char Broiled" | February 14, 2011 | 1.13 |
Char's and Lauren's friendship cease in the house when the two engage in a confrontation. Kori opens up about a turbulent past, which binds her even closer to Char.
| 99 | 6 | "Play With It" | February 21, 2011 | 1.41 |
New girl Jennifer arrives to the house. Lauren comes to blows with two of her roommates, leaving one girl reduced to tears. Jennifer recruits two of the girls to audition for Playboy. Nikki and Lauren decide to ruin the girls day by taking both cars for the whole day, leading to Jenn, Ashley and Kori to try and find a ride to their Playboy audition. Note: Jennifer replaces Sydney.
| 100 | 7 | "Beat-Down Barbie" | March 7, 2011 | 1.43 |
The girls go on air with Dr. Drew and Psycho Mike. Char is once again the focal point of house drama as Kori and Ashley square off to defend her honour.
| 101 | 8 | "Weak Sauce" | March 14, 2011 | 1.46 |
The girls find out Ashley will not be returning to the house. The arrival of a new roommate shakes the house from the jump. Trouble looms for Jennifer when nemeses Nikki and Lauren gain an unforeseen ally. Notes: Ashley is removed from the house. Wilmarie replaces Ashley.
| 102 | 9 | "Power Trippin" | March 21, 2011 | 1.57 |
Nikki puts herself in the line of fire after jumping into an altercation between Lauren and Jessica. One roommate is subject to relentless torture as new girl Wilmarie solidifies her dominance in the house. Note: Jennifer is removed from the house.
| 103 | 10 | "Wilma Goes BAMM-BAMM" | March 28, 2011 | 1.63 |
Old alliances begin to crumble as Nikki's constant provoking pushes another roommate to a dark place.
| 104 | 11 | "Don't Hate La Playa" | April 11, 2011 | 1.36 |
The episode picks up with Wimarie and Nikki getting into a fight in the limo. An unlikely alliance forms between two top dogs as Lauren reaches the end of her tether with Nikki.
| 105 | 12 | "Army of One" | April 18, 2011 | 1.61 |
Nikki continues to make enemies as her antagonizing ways cause Wilmarie to snap. Meanwhile, Kori sees fit to loosen herself from Char's tight grip.
| 106 | 13 | "Only the Bad Remain" | April 25, 2011 | 1.36 |
Wilmarie showcases to Nikki exactly what she thinks of her, but not without consequences. Jade and Sydney return to the show for a photo shoot. Nikki, Kori, Jessica, Lauren and Char bid an emotional farewell to the Hollywood house. Notes: Wilmarie is removed from the house. Jade and Sydney make an appearance.
| 107 | 14 | "Reunion: Part 1" | May 2, 2011 | 1.55 |
Sparks start to fly as Perez Hilton reunites the cast to discuss unfinished business. Char learns exactly how her actions in the house have ruined past friendships, and Sydney enters the reunion stage with a violent surprise for one girl.
| 108 | 15 | "Reunion: Part 2" | May 9, 2011 | 1.48 |
Jessica celebrates her birthday with special guests Amber M. of season 3 and Kristen of season 5. A food fight turns serious when an unexpected culprit is at the center of a physical altercation between Kori and Jade.

== Nominations ==
| Year | Awards ceremony | Award | Results |
|---|---|---|---|
| 2011 | iVillage Entertainment Awards | Favorite Reality-Show Guilty Pleasure | Nominated |
