= Bad Girls Club season 15 =

Bad Girls Club
- Season 15
- The original eight "Bad" Girls of season 15 left to right: Asia, Amber, Jessica, Annalisa, Kristina, Angela, Olivia, and Diamond

Release
- Original network: Oxygen
- Original release: March 15 – June 7, 2016

Season chronology
- ← Previous; Season 14 Next → Season 16

Bad Girls Club: Twisted Sisters is the fifteenth season of the Oxygen reality television series Bad Girls Club. This is the eighth edition of Bad Girls Club to film in Los Angeles. In a change from the original casting format, this season features a complete cast of sisters. Life coach Laura Baron returns for a fourth and final season.

== Cast ==
=== Original Bad Girls ===
The season began with eight original bad girls. Two left voluntarily and three were removed by production. Six replacement bad girls were introduced in their absences later in the season.

Name	Age (Note: Age at time of filming)	Hometown	Nickname
Angela Babicz	25	Clifton, New Jersey	The Competitive Cuties
Kristina Babicz	22	Clifton, New Jersey	The Competitive Cuties
Annalisa "Anna" Giordano	23	Arden Heights, New York	The Staten Stunners
Jessica Giordano	23	Arden Heights, New York	The Staten Stunners
Amber Thorne	26	Houston, Texas	The Sultry Sirens
Asia Jeudy	24	Brooklyn, New York	The Sultry Sirens
Olivia "Liv" Adams (Note: Diamond and Olivia claimed to be half-sisters, and later revealed that they are actually exes in episode 5.)	25	Allentown, Pennsylvania	The Swanky Swindlers
Diamond "Dime" Jimenez	25	Harlem, New York	The Swanky Swindlers

=== Replacement Bad Girls ===
Name	Age	Hometown	Nickname	Replaced
Amanda Hepperle (Note: Amanda and Victoria left the house voluntarily before they were properly introduced to the season. Therefore their age, hometown, and nicknames are unknown.)	26	Guttenberg, New Jersey	The Ghost Twins	Annalisa
Victoria Hepperle	26	Guttenberg, New Jersey	The Ghost Twins	Jessica
Jaimee Wallace	22	Miami, Florida	The Queens of Twerkville	Victoria
Jazmyn Wallace	21	Miami, Florida	The Queens of Twerkville	Victoria
Allison Green	24	Las Vegas, Nevada	The Rock-N-Roll Barbies	Amanda
Melissa Green	27	Las Vegas, Nevada	The Rock-N-Roll Barbies	Amanda
Hanan Ibrahim	24	Covina, California	The Devious Divorcees	Diamond
Suha "Susu" Ibrahim	26	Covina, California	The Devious Divorcees	Olivia

=== Duration of Cast ===
Bad Girl	Episodes									
Bad Girl	1	2	3	4	5	6	7	8	9	10
Amber	Featured									
Asia	Featured									
Angela	Featured							removed (Note: Angela was removed from the house after causing harm to Hanan during a physical altercation with Hanan and Suha.)	Appeared (Note: Angela appeared on video calls with Kristina.)	
Kristina	Featured									
Diamond	Featured					removed (Note: Diamond and Olivia were removed from the house after admitting that they were not sisters but in fact exes.)				
Olivia	Featured					removed				
Annalisa	Featured	Left (Note: Annalisa and Jessica voluntarily left the house after a heated argument with Angela and an altercation with Angela, Amber, Asia and Kristina.)								
Jessica	Featured	Left								
Amanda			Left (Note: Amanda and Victoria replaced Annalisa and Jessica, but voluntarily left the house in the same episode after being physically attacked by Amber, Angela, Asia and Kristina.)							
Victoria			Left							
Jaimee				Entered (Note: Jaimee & Jazmyn and Allison & Melissa replaced Amanda and Victoria.)	Featured					
Jazmyn				Entered	Featured					
Allison				Entered	Featured			Left (Note: Allison and Melissa voluntarily left the house after multiple physical altercations with Jaimee and Jazmyn.)		
Melissa				Entered	Featured			Left		
Hanan							Entered (Note: Hanan and Suha replaced Diamond and Olivia.)	Featured		removed (Note: Hanan and Suha were removed from the house after multiple physical altercations with Amber and Kristina.)
Suha							Entered	Featured		removed

== Hepperle lawsuit against production ==
In the season's third episode, twin sisters Amanda and Victoria Hepperle were brought in as replacements for Annalisa and Jessica, who had left the episode prior. Upon their entry, the Hepperles, who were handcuffed as a part of their introduction, were showered with powder and accosted by the rest of the girls, which then led to their physical altercation with Kristina, Amber, Asia, and Angela, resulting in one of the Hepperles' glasses breaking. Subsequently, their faces and identities were obscured.

In June 2016, the Hepperles filed a lawsuit against Oxygen Network's parent companies Bunim/Murray Productions, Atrium Entertainment, and NBC Universal Media, and the show's producers and cast members, with the claim that the attack was orchestrated by production for ratings, seeking punitive damages for assault, battery, false imprisonment, conspiracy, intentional infliction of emotional distress and negligence. Prior to their participation, the Hepperles claim producers assured that "No fighting, no touching, no slapping, no grabbing, no biting, and no violence of any sort will be permitted," and "fighting inside or outside of the premises" would result in removal from the show. The lawsuit claimed the Hepperles left "bleeding, bruised, dazed, confounded, scared, in shock, terrorized and completely blindsided by what just occurred," and were taken to urgent care.

== Episodes ==
No. overall	No. in season	Title	Original release date	Viewers (millions)
236	0	"Casting Special"	March 8, 2016	0.249
Bad Girl alums Tanisha Thomas, Jelaminah Lanier, Camilla Poindexter, Jasmine Carter and Jonica Booth introduce the 8 new sisters to the season.
237	1	"Sis and The City"	March 15, 2016	0.575
The 8 new bad girls come into the house. Olivia shares a secret to the other girls which shocks the whole house leading to an emotional night. Sisters Kristina and Angela can't stop fighting with each other, and Annalisa and Jessica are pegged as the outsiders.
238	2	"Twin Some, Lose Some"	March 22, 2016	0.508
Annalisa and Jessica face off with the other roommates, leading to them squirting sprite on them with water guns, leading to their departure. The producers dig deeper into Olivia's story. Note: Annalisa and Jessica voluntarily leave the house.
239	3	"Release the Beast and Other Tall Tales"	March 29, 2016	0.620
The girls see their new replacements and decide to pull a prank on them. When the cops show up to the house, they wonder what they did, but when they see the new girls with strippers, they pull their prank on them which started with throwing flour all over them, sparking a physical altercation between them and Kristina, Angela, Asia and Amber. The new girls decide to leave after getting brutally attacked. Olivia must deal with consequences after lying about her having cancer. After a fun day of indoor soccer, Angela and Kristina start fighting again. Note: Amanda and Victoria replaced Annalisa and Jessica, but voluntarily left the house on the same episode.
240	4	"No Room for T.H.O.T.S."	April 5, 2016	0.487
4 new girls come into the house, shocking all the other girls as to why there are 4 of them. Jazmyn and Jaimee's big mouths stir up a huge limo fight. Note: Jazmyn, Jaimee, Allison and Melissa replaced Amanda and Victoria.
241	5	"A Family Affair (& other tall tales) Part Deux"	April 12, 2016	0.519
Olivia spills a huge secret about her and Diamond not being sisters, leading to the house being shocked and confused. The episode ends with a cliffhanger fight between Jazmyn and Jaimee vs. Asia and Amber on the staircase.
242	6	"Recipe for Disaster"	April 19, 2016	0.636
The episode picks up with the huge stairs fight resulting in Amber and Asia getting sent to a hotel with a bloody nose for Amber. Diamond and Olivia are sent packing after admitting they weren't sisters after this show was about sisters. Kristina and Angela start yet again another fight with Jazmyn and Jaimee in the limo. Note: Diamond and Olivia are removed from the house.
243	7	"Birthday Blowout"	April 26, 2016	0.599
Angela celebrates her birthday with a scavenger hunt. After new girls Hanan and Susu surprise the other girls at Angela's birthday, they immediately click with Jaz and Jaimee. Angela starts a fight with Hanan leading to a huge bar fight which eventually left Hanan with a bloody face after Angela threw a glass at her. Angela and Kristina go to a hotel, while Allison starts a fight with Jazmyn in the limo. Note: Hanan and Suha replaced Diamond and Olivia.
244	8	"OG Overthrow"	May 3, 2016	0.573
Angela is officially removed from the house after throwing a glass at Hanan. The producers say that they would like Kristina to come back to the house and continue their life coach sessions with Angela via skype. They both agree and Kristina returns to the house without her sister. After another fight with Jazmyn and Jaimee, Allison and Melissa contemplate their reasons to be in the house and ultimately decide to leave the house. Hanan, Susu, Jazmyn and Jaimee lock the other 3 originals out of the house. After an argument about twerking, this sparks a huge fight in the computer room, leading to all the girls except Hanan and Susu to be sent to a hotel. Notes: Angela is removed from the house. Allison and Melissa voluntarily leave the house.
245	9	"Bids, Breakthroughs and Barbecues"	May 10, 2016	0.614
The girls auction themselves off for charity. Parent's weekend arrives! Jaz and Jaimee's parents can't seem to stop fighting, and Angela and Kristina talk to their parents with Laura about what has happened. The episode ends with another stairs fight between Hanan and Susu vs. Kristina. Note: Angela makes an appearance.
246	10	"Five Dollar Farewell"	May 17, 2016	0.608
The episode picks up with the fight between Hanan and Susu and Kristina resulting in Susu throwing glass pictures at the other girls. Hanan and Susu are sent to a hotel but eventually return in the morning. After Kristina makes a comment about Susu's kids, Susu and Hanan have had enough with the disrespect and attack Kristina and Amber. After Susu threw glass pictures at Kristina and Amber and Hanan threw a chair at Amber, the producers decide that they are too violent to remain in the house. They are sent packing, leading to an emotional goodbye between them and Jazmyn and Jaimee. The rest of the girls say goodbye. Notes: Hanan and Suha are removed from the house. Angela makes an appearance.
247	11	"Reunion: Part 1"	May 24, 2016	0.701
The girls all arrive to the reunion (minus Annalisa, Jessica, Amanda and Victoria.) The final five girls come to stage with tensions being raised between Jaz and Jaimee and the other 3 girls.
248	12	"Reunion: Part 2"	May 31, 2016	0.592
Diamond and Olivia return to stage resulting in 3 physical fights between each other. Life coach Laura comes to stage.
249	13	"Reunion: Part 3"	June 7, 2016	0.556
After Jazmyn and Jaimee continued to fight with the other girls, they are officially kicked off stage. Hanan and Susu come to stage with revenge against Kristina and Angela, sparking in multiple physical altercations between them. The girls officially say goodbye. A small preview of the next season Social Disruption is posted at the end.
