= Bad Girls Club season 7 =

Bad Girls Club
- Season 7
- The original seven bad girls, from left to right: Tasha, Nastasia, Angelic, Priscilla, Tiara, Judith, and Shelly
- No. of episodes: 15

Release
- Original network: Oxygen
- Original release: August 1 – November 14, 2011

Season chronology
- ← Previous; Season 6 Next → Season 8

The seventh season of Bad Girls Club is titled Bad Girls Club: New Orleans and premiered on August 1, 2011, on Oxygen. Production of the season began in February 2011, and was primarily filmed in New Orleans, Louisiana.

On October 15, 2026, it was announced that the original cast, sans Tasha Malek, are slated to appear on Bad Girls Club: Unfinished Business, a 2-episode unscripted special hosted by Tanisha Thomas on Fandango.

== Production ==
On February 16, 2011, it was reported that the production was using the home of former Hornets basketball coach Byron Scott in Kenner, Louisiana for what was then called "Bad Girls Boot Camp." Interim Code Enforcement Director Tamithia Shaw said "[she] understands the site will be used for four months, but that pre-production work apparently has been going on for two or three weeks." She said that the cast was not there. The news initially created outrage among the neighbors. The production budget for the season was $6.5 million.

In March 2011, three cast members modeled House of Lounge lingerie at New Orleans Fashion Week.

=== Controversy ===
On March 13, 2011, TMZ.com reported that production was banned from at least eight night clubs due to the clubs "not wanting to be associated with the show's bad image." The cast were also not allowed to attend Pierre Thomas's Mardi Gras party at The Metropolitan Night Club.

== Residence ==
The cast lived at a house at 100 Chateau Saint Michel Drive, in Kenner, Louisiana, a suburb of New Orleans. The 9,300-square-foot house, which was last sold in 2013 for $825,000 features 6 bedrooms, 7 bathrooms, a landscaped front garden, a pool, an entertainment room, and an outdoor bungalow. The residence was designed by production designer Jeff Eyser and set decorator Alexis Karpf. The official house tour was uploaded to YouTube on July 6, 2011.

Eyser noted that everything in the main room, such as the indoor bar, was custom made. The walls were decorated with New Orleans artist Sarah Dunn's botanical paintings. The dining room was a small blue room with no doors and a large painting of New Orleans in the early 20th century. The kitchen, which featured a marble table, included furniture from IKEA. Unlike previous seasons where all bedrooms were not similar, these bedrooms looked the same.

The make-up room featured early 20th-century furniture. Karpf said that the make-up room is her favorite and has an "industrial feel". In the same room, the girls were given Voodoo dolls that resembled themselves. The champagne room had dark furniture of a mixture of red and black pillows and sofas. In the middle of the room was a stripper pole. The back yard had a pool table, swimming pool, lounge chairs and a pond.

== Police incident ==
On April 12, 2011, the Kenner Police Department was dispatched to 100 Chateau Saint Michel Drive, following a call from cast member Tasha Malek stating that she was physically assaulted by her housemate, Nastasia Townsend. Upon arrival, Malek told Officer Peter Foltz that Townsend had packed her personal belongings in garbage bags then physically assaulted her, and that she wanted to file a formal complaint. Police then questioned Townsend, to which she claimed that Malek had assaulted her first, causing the altercation. The two were issued summons by the police for disturbing the peace and disorderly conduct.

== Cast ==
The season began with seven original bad girls, of which three were removed by production. One replacement bad girl was introduced in their absences later in the season.

Name	Age (Note: Age at time of filming)	Hometown	Nickname	Replaced
Angelic "Angie" Castillo	21	Bronx, New York	The Bronx Bombshell	—N/a
Judith "Judi" Jackson	21	Olympia Fields, Illinois	The Voodoo Vixen	—N/a
Nastasia "Stasi" Townsend	23	Huntington Beach, California	The Powerhouse	—N/a
Priscilla Mennella	25	Staten Island, New York	The Staten Island Spitfire	—N/a
Shelly Hickman	23	St. Louis, Missouri	The Lady Killer	—N/a
Tasha Malek	23	Miami, Florida	The Posh Princess	—N/a
Tiara Hodge	23	Gary, Indiana	The Goofy Gangsta	—N/a
Cheyenne Evans	22	Round Rock, Texas	The Texan Vixen	Priscilla

=== Duration of Cast ===
Bad Girl	Episodes												
Bad Girl	1	2	3	4	5	6	7	8	9	10	11	12	13
Angie	Featured												
Judi	Featured												
Shelly	Featured												
Tiara	Featured												
Nastasia	Featured												removed (Note: Nastasia was removed from the house by production after physically attacking Shelly multiple times.)
Tasha	Featured											removed (Note: Tasha was removed from the house by production after starting a physical altercation with Nastasia.)	
Priscilla	Featured								removed (Note: Priscilla was removed from the house by production after causing harm and threatening Judi with a baton during a physical altercation.)				
Cheyenne									Entered (Note: Cheyenne replaced Priscilla.)	Featured			Kicked (Note: Cheyenne was kicked out of the house by Tiara after being tricked into leaving thinking it was her time to leave.)

== Episodes ==
No. overall	No. in season	Title	Original release date	Viewers (millions)
109	1	"I Got the Voodoo for U"	August 1, 2011	1.38
Seven new "bad girls" enter the mansion in New Orleans. Their new friendships are tested, and Judi's partying way creates a night of havoc in the house. Tension starts to build between Judi and Shelly that leads to a heated altercation. The girls try to calm the situation down but after Judi secretly spits in the girls pizza's, she becomes the house outcast and Shelly, Priscilla and Tasha get sent to a hotel for the night.
110	2	"Call Me Karma"	August 8, 2011	1.25
Shelly, Tasha, and Priscilla return to the house the next morning. Judi apologizes to everyone, only to have her apology rebuffed. Tasha, discovering her bed trashed, confronts Angelic. Judi denies any involvement, having been drunk the previous night. This resulted in a heated argument between Judi and Angelic. Shelly teams with the rest of the girls to kick Judi out of the house. Nastasia gets tired of the girls ganging up on Judi and decides to have a talk with her. After reaching her breaking point, Judi makes amends with Nastasia, Angelic, and Tiara.
111	3	"A Tale of Two Cliques"	August 15, 2011	1.30
Judi is left in the middle while the house splits into two cliques. Later, the girls head out to a Mardi Gras celebration. Priscilla and Nastasia get into an argument in the laundry room.
112	4	"Can I Bayou A Drink?"	August 22, 2011	1.28
Nastasia and Shelly argue at dinner, which results in an altercation and a bad girl leaving soaked. After that dinner, Judi's driving habits result in an altercation between her and Tiara. At the end of the episode, after getting tattoos, Tiara and Judi make amends.
113	5	"Playing for the Other Team"	August 29, 2011	1.28
The Bad Girls book a suite for an upcoming Mardi Gras party, while Shelly is uncertain of who her real friends are. She reaches her breaking point after her girlfriend leaves to return to war. Meanwhile, tensions reach a peak between Shelly and Judi to the point where a physical altercation occurs.
114	6	"Better Off Dread"	September 5, 2011	1.28
Tiara and Tasha fight over a boy. Meanwhile, Angie finds herself caught in the middle of the two cliques, which climaxes in a fight when one clique refuses to return for the other. The tensions between the two cliques result in a physical fight in the limousine, ending the episode with a cliffhanger.
115	7	"Cat Scratch Fever"	September 12, 2011	1.49
This episode picks up with the fight among Tiara, Nastasia, and Judi in the limo, which lands Shelly and Angielic in jail for the evening. While they are gone, the other girls go to a hotel to cool off for the night. Angelic and Shelly return home to find their possessions trashed. A physical altercation occurs between Angelic and Tiara. While Angelic and Shelly were in jail, a prank war started between Judi Priscilla and Tasha. Meanwhile, Angelic, Priscilla, and Tasha model for the House of Lounge lingerie and New Orleans Fashion Week. While out at a strip club, Angelic and Tiara engage in another physical altercation, which ends their friendship.
116	8	"An Eye for An Eye"	September 19, 2011	1.64
After arriving to witness their beds destroyed, Shelly and Angie conspire to have Nastasia confess. After their failed attempt with sabotaging Nastasia's bleach, Angie and Shelly decide to ruin Natasia's contact lenses. Nastasia intimidates her fellow cast-members to find the culprit, on whom she swears revenge. Meanwhile, Judi gradually concocts a way to evict Priscilla. Angie and Tiara mend their fractured friendship. The next night, Judi takes a cooking pot and mixes cold cereal with milk. She then throws the contents on Priscilla's bed while she is asleep. Judi tries to awake Priscilla by tapping on her window. Priscilla awakens and attacks Judi. The episode ends with the two fighting in the hallway outside of Priscilla and Tasha's bedroom.
117	9	"Revenge Is a Dish Best Served Cold"	September 26, 2011	1.75
The fight between Priscilla and Judi continues in the makeup room. Tasha attempts to jump in, but she is stopped by Nastasia and Tiara. Priscilla is evicted because of the fight, leaving Judi's face covered in blood. The other Bad Girls reflect on the shocking events that got Priscilla sent home. A new bad girl then enters the house to replace Priscilla. Meanwhile, the pranks continue, and several altercations occur. Nastasia throws a drink on Tasha and throws trash all over her room. Shelly gets into a physical fight with Judi and Nastasia, and then after Judi calls Angie fake they get into a fight. Notes: Priscilla is removed from the house. Cheyenne replaces Priscilla.
118	10	"Tirades, Truces and Tiaras"	October 3, 2011	1.81
Tiara celebrates her birthday weekend. The girls temporarily put their drama on hold. Cheyenne alienates herself after making a racial comment about clubs. Cheyenne and Nastasia get into an argument. Nastasia then gets angry with Judi after Judi fails to carry the cake from Tiara's birthday party. Nastasia and Shelly go out to brunch and call a truce to discuss plans to get rid of Tasha and Judi.
119	11	"Keeping It 100"	October 17, 2011	1.77
Nastasia and Shelly start to get along more, and Judi seeks to get her voodoo doll fixed. The Bad Girls travel to the New Orleans Voodoo Museum, which creeps them out. When the girls arrive home, they find out that they will be going to Barbados. The girls want to forget the drama and have a good time. However, Judi starts drinking and making a scene in public, and Tasha's constant complaining annoys the other girls. Nastasia tries to send Tasha and Judi home, which results in a physical altercation between Tasha and Nastasia.
120	12	"Can't Teach Old Dogs New Tricks"	October 24, 2011	1.62
The episode starts with the fight between Nastasia and Tasha. Tasha calls the cops on Nastasia. Tasha decides to leave the house. Nastasia and Judi make up and Tiara tells Nastasia that Angelic told her that it was Shelly who messed with her contacts. Nastasia makes a plan to attack Shelly on the last day. Judi, Shelly, Angelic, and Cheyenne raise money for an animal charity. Judi and Cheyenne get in an argument. The girls are all sick of Cheyenne's dirty ways, being rude, and leaving a mess everywhere, so Nastasia, Judi, and Tiara decide to throw her bed into the pool. Tiara wants Cheyenne to leave. Note: Tasha is removed from the house.
121	13	"Parting Shots"	October 31, 2011	1.52
The episode picks up with Tiara, Judi and Nastasia throwing Cheyenne's mattress in the pool. Cheyenne then confronts them. Later that night, Tiara doesn't want Cheyenne to go to dinner with the girls. The next day, Tiara tricks Cheyenne into leaving by putting her luggage in her room, calling the limousine to pick her up and telling her she needs to go. Cheyenne believes Tiara and leaves. The remaining 5 girls head to the club later that night. Once they get home Nastasia confronts Angie and Shelly about the contacts. Nastasia then physically attacks Shelly. Nastasia is removed from the house. Angie, Tiara, Shelly, and Judi say their goodbyes and leave. Notes: Cheyenne is kicked out of the house. Nastasia is removed from the house.
122	14	"Reunion: Part 1"	November 7, 2011	1.89
Perez Hilton hosts the first part of a two-part reunion where the Bad Girls look back on their experience in the house, but not without some drama. Nastasia and Shelly get into a physical altercation.
123	15	"Reunion: Part 2"	November 14, 2011	1.48
Things get heated as the girls wrap up their season in the second part of the reunion. Priscilla and Angie get into a heated argument, which leads to a physical altercation.
