= Bad Girls Club season 8 =

Bad Girls Club
- Season 8
- The original seven "Bad" Girls of season eight, left to right: Top: Gia, Erica, Jenna, Amy, Demitra Bottom: Gabrielle, Danielle
- No. of episodes: 15

Release
- Original network: Oxygen
- Original release: January 23 – May 7, 2012

Season chronology
- ← Previous; Season 7 Next → Season 9

The eighth season of Bad Girls Club is titled Bad Girls Club: Las Vegas and premiered on January 23, 2012 on the Oxygen channel. Production of the season began in late 2011, and was located in Las Vegas, Nevada.

== Residence ==
The cast for the eighth season lived at the Thunderbolt Estate, located at 3730 Topaz Street. The 13,000-square-foot mansion sits on 2.3 acres and includes seven bedrooms and nine bathrooms with a double-height living room, a pool, a white-sand lounging area, a gym, a ballet room, a theater, an outdoor meditation area, and a tennis court.

== Cast ==
The season began with seven original bad girls. Three left voluntarily, and two were removed by production. Three replacement bad girls were introduced in their absences later in the season.

Name	Age (Note: Age at time of filming)	Hometown	Nickname	Replaced
Amy Cieslowski	23	Chicago, Illinois	The Hot Mess	—N/a
Danielle "Danni" Victor (Note: Danielle and Gabrielle are identical twins.)	23	Methuen, Massachusetts	The Black Sheep	—N/a
Demitra "Mimi" Roche †	25	Miami, Florida	The Miami Maverick	—N/a
Erica "Venetia" Figueroa	23	Atlanta, Georgia	The Red-Headed Hustler	—N/a
Gabrielle "Gabi" Victor	23	Methuen, Massachusetts	The Queen B	—N/a
Gia Sapp-Hernandez	22	Newark, Delaware	The Scandalous Schoolgirl	—N/a
Jenna Russo	24	Wantagh, New York	The Naughty New Yorker	—N/a
Elease Donovan	24	Miami, Florida	The Brick House	Jenna
Christine Moon	23	Nashville, Tennessee	The Tennessee Temptation	Danielle
Camilla Poindexter	24	Long Beach, California	The Cali Cutthroat	Gabrielle

=== Duration of cast ===
Bad Girl	Episodes												
Bad Girl	1	2	3	4	5	6	7	8	9	10	11	12	13
Amy	Featured												
Demitra	Featured								Featured (Note: Demitra left the house temporarily because of a missing passport in episode 9, and was convinced by Erica, Gia, Amy, and Elease to return in episode 10.)		Featured		
Erica	Featured												
Gia	Featured												
Danni	Featured									Left (Note: Danielle and Gabrielle left the house voluntarily after a physical altercation with Gia, Elease, Erica, and Demitra.)			
Gabi	Featured									Left			
Jenna	Featured		removed (Note: Jenna was removed from the house by production after multiple physical altercations with Erica, Gia, Danni, and Gabi, and throwing a pool ball.)	Appeared (Note: Jenna made an appearance for the Oxygen photo shoot.)									
Elease				Entered (Note: Elease replaced Jenna.)	Featured								
Camilla											Entered (Note: Camilla replaced Danielle.)	Featured	removed (Note: Camilla was removed from the house by production after physically attacking Demitra, Amy and Elease.)
Christine											Left (Note: Christine replaced Gabrielle and voluntarily left the house in the same episode after being homesick.)		

== Episodes ==
No. overall	No. in season	Title	Original release date	Viewers (millions)
124	1	"Throw Up. Throw Down."	January 23, 2012	1.702
Bad Girls Club hits for a new city Las Vegas with a surprise of twin sisters entering the Bad Girls Mansion. Tensions rises between Gia, Amy and Jenna causing multiple physical altercations into the house. One bad girl voluntarily left the house and her fate is in limbo.
125	2	"Weaving Las Vegas"	January 30, 2012	1.383
Amy has a "pretend wedding" but regrets it when she thinks about her ex boyfriend. Gia returns to the house. Meanwhile, Erica wants Jenna out of the house but Jenna won't leave without a fight.
126	3	"Chicks Before Hicks"	February 6, 2012	1.333
Erica, Gia and the twins team up in a plot to get Jenna out of the house but Jenna won't leave without a fight. Meanwhile, Mimi switches onto Amy and Jenna's side but not without consequences. Note: Jenna is removed from the house.
127	4	"Sink or Swim"	February 13, 2012	1.247
Jenna returns to the house for a photoshoot, and Erica is not to happy to see her. New girl Elease arrives and is immediately not liked by any of the girls. Season 7 Girls Tiara and Nastasia invite the girls to a party. After the girls leave Elease at the party, they go on and destroy all of her things. Elease comes to the house and tries to destroy Gia, Amy, and Erica's stuff leading to Gia pushing her in the pool. Then the girls all team up to attack Elease. Notes: Jenna makes an appearance. Elease replaces Jenna.
128	5	"A New Elease on Life"	February 20, 2012	1.397
Drama causes weariness on some of the "bad" girls. Meanwhile, Amy finds a boy toy, while still having one at home. Following an argument, Gabi provokes Elease by drawing pictures of her by the computer. After Elease pushes Gabi of the desk, Gabi pulls Elease's hair making her fall to the ground. After Elease tries to attack Gabi, Danni jumps in and shows Elease who the bosses are of the house. The girls start to go against the twins after they jump Elease once again.
129	6	"Bed, Bathing Suit and Beyond"	February 27, 2012	1.629
After the truce with Elease is formed, Erica, Gia and Demitra decide to make an alliance with her. However, the twins are still very adamant on getting Elease out of the house causing the others to rethink their relationship with the twins.
130	7	"Invasion of the Scavengers"	March 5, 2012	1.503
Erica and Gia decide to join forces with the twins once again after the other roommates agitate them. Meanwhile, Mimi becomes the next target after she befriends Elease. Erica, Gia and the twins lock out Amy, Elease and Mimi of their hotel room making Mimi snap.
131	8	"Sister Act"	March 12, 2012	1.632
Elease's sister pays a visit to the house, much to the annoyance of the twins. Meanwhile, Flo Rida and Pleasure P visit the house to party with the Bad Girls.
132	9	"Evil Pair"	March 19, 2012	1.640
The twins decide to create some drama. This plan backfires. The girls go south of the border to Cabo San Lucas, except for Mimi who forgot her passport at home and decides to go back home. Note: Demitra temporarily left the house.
133	10	"Double Trouble"	March 26, 2012	1.888
The twins are the center of a major fight, which leads to their departure. Meanwhile, the other girls plan to bring a fallen Bad Girl back to the house. Notes: Demitra returns to the house. Danielle and Gabrielle both voluntarily leave the house.
134	11	"Bad Girl Players"	April 2, 2012	1.446
Erica is determined to make her music career to a higher level and meets a rapper named Jazzy and is interested in Gia. Two new girls enter the house but one just leaves 3 days after she arrived. Demitra is attacked in the club and everyone helps her including the two new girls which marks their stay in the house. Note: Christine and Camilla replace Danielle and Gabrielle.
135	12	"Breakup Breakdown"	April 16, 2012	1.716
The episode picks up with Christine being attacked in the limo leading to her official departure. After disagreeing with what the girls did to Christine, Demitra fears that she is the next target; while Amy and Camilla have a sexy night, things backfire and it ends up with a fight. Note: Christine voluntarily leaves the house.
136	13	"Go Big Go Home"	April 23, 2012	1.802
Elease, Amy and Mimi want Camilla out but their plan backfires at first which leads to Camilla attacking Mimi & Amy. After pretty much attacking everyone in the house, Camilla is sent home. The girls say goodbye to Las Vegas. Note: Camilla is removed from the house.
137	14	"Reunion: Part 1"	April 30, 2012	2.076
Tanisha Thomas hosts the reunion as the bad girls of Las Vegas reunite in Los Angeles to discuss the fights, arguments, and relationships they had while in the house. Blowups quickly fold when three bad girls get into physical altercations.
138	15	"Reunion: Part 2"	May 7, 2012	2.162
The second part of the reunion continues with bad blood between Elease and Camilla going on. Erica and Danni face off and it leads to a shocking conclusion. Meanwhile, Jenna returns and decides to go head to head with Gia.

== See also ==
- List of television shows set in Las Vegas
