= Baddies season 1 =

2021 American reality television season

Baddies
- Season 1
- Starring: Seven Craft; Judith Jackson; Natalie Nunn; Sarah Oliver; Christina Salgado; Janelle Shanks; Sidney Starr; Tanisha Thomas
- No. of episodes: 12

Release
- Original network: Zeus Network
- Original release: May 16 – August 22, 2021

Season chronology
- Next → Season 2

The first season of Baddies, officially titled Baddies ATL, aired on the Zeus Network from May 16, 2021, to August 22, 2021, and is filmed in Atlanta, Georgia.

The season focuses on the original Bad Girls of reality television, Seven Craft, Judi Jackson, Natalie Nunn, Sarah Oliver, Christina Salgado, Janelle Shanks,Tanisha Thomas and Newbie Sidney Starr. Mehgan James is featured in a recurring capacity. The season had 12 episodes, including a two-part reunion special hosted by Tamar Braxton and Jason Lee.

This was the final season for Craft, Jackson, Shanks and Thomas. This was also the final season for Oliver and Starr as full-time cast members.

== Production and crew ==
In early 2019, talks for a potential reboot of the Bad Girls Club came about when Natalie Nunn announced that a reunion special was in the works. The reunion was initially developed for release on the platform, OnlyFans. In December 2020, six former Bad Girls Club cast members, including Nunn, Oliver and Salgado appeared together on an episode of The Conversation to confront their issues surrounding the OnlyFans project.

After the final episode of The Conversation special aired, it was announced that the Baddies series was in production. On February 14, 2021, Zeus Network released a teaser trailer for Baddies ATL, which saw eight former Bad Girls Club cast members from various seasons reunite. The entire season was filmed in a mansion in Atlanta.

== Cast ==
List of Baddies ATL main cast members
Main Cast	Age (Note: Age at time of filming)	First appearance	Hometown
Christina Salgado	31	Bad Girls Club 9: Mexico	Jersey City, New Jersey
Janelle Shanks	31	Bad Girls Club 11: Miami	Houston, Texas
Judith “Judi” Jackson	32	Bad Girls Club 7: New Orleans	Olympia Fields, Illinois
Natalie Nunn	36	Bad Girls Club 4: Los Angeles	Oakland, California
Sarah Oliver	36	Bad Girls Club 11: Miami	Riverdale, Georgia
Seven Craft	26	Bad Girls Club 17: East Meets West	Fort Washington, Maryland
Sidney “Starr” Favors	32	Love & Hip Hop: New York 9	Chicago, Illinois
Tanisha Thomas	35	Bad Girls Club 2: Los Angeles	Brooklyn, New York

List of Baddies ATL supporting cast members
Supporting Cast	Age	First appearance	Hometown
Mehgan James	31	Bad Girls Club 9: Mexico	Texas City, Texas

== Cast duration ==
Baddie	Episodes										Reunion	
Baddie	1	2	3	4	5	6	7	8	9	10	11	12
Christina	Featured											
Janelle	Featured											
Natalie	Featured											
Sarah	Featured											
Seven	Featured											
Sidney	Featured											
Tanisha	Featured											
Judi	Featured							Left (Note: Judi left the show after multiple altercations with Sidney and to care for her dog.)	Appeared (Note: Judi appears at Sidney’s birthday party.)		Featured	
Supporting cast members
Mehgan								Supporting (Note: Mehgan visits Sidney at the house before her birthday party.)				Supporting (Note: Mehgan appears in the second episode of the reunion as a guest.)

== Reunion ==
The final episode was followed by a two-part reunion special, hosted by Tamar Braxton and Jason Lee, which was released on August 15, 2021, and August 22, 2021. Oliver chose not to attend the taping due to ongoing conflict with her cast members, with the reunion special focusing on the audio recordings she released of Nunn on the day of filming.

Baddies S1 Reunion Seating Arrangement
Viewer's Left				HOSTS		Viewer's Right			
Sidney	Seven	Christina	Tanisha	Tamar Braxton	Jason Lee	Natalie	Judi	Janelle	Mehgan

Indicates a main cast member.
Indicates a supporting cast member present for parts of the Reunion.

== After filming ==
- Natalie continues to appear in every subsequent season, reunion and audition of Baddies as the self-proclaimed creator and CEO.
- Natalie appeared on The Conversation, Aunt-Tea Podcast, Scotty With The Baby and many other Zeus productions, due to her close ties to the network.
- Christina, Janelle, Sarah and Sidney made guest appearances on Baddies South.
- Natalie, Janelle, Seven, Sidney and Mehgan all made guest appearances on Bad vs. Wild.
- Tanisha appeared on the first season of House of Villains.
- Sidney made a cameo appearance on Baddies Midwest.
- Sarah, Judi, Janelle, Seven and Tanisha returned for a special 'Bad Girls' reunion segment of Baddies USA: Chapter One.

== Episodes ==
Baddies season 1 episodes
No. overall	No. in season	Title	Original release date
1	1	"Reunited and It Feels So...BAD"	May 16, 2021
2	2	"Now You See Me, Now You Don't"	May 23, 2021
3	3	"Sit Down or Throw Down"	May 30, 2021
4	4	"Let's Get to the Bag"	June 6, 2021
5	5	"It's About to Go Down"	June 13, 2021
6	6	"Even Baddies Need a Break"	June 20, 2021
7	7	"You and All Yo BULL"	June 27, 2021
8	8	"SURPRISE!"	July 11, 2021
9	9	"It's Time for the TWERKULATOR!"	July 18, 2021
10	10	"All Bad Things Come to An End"	July 25, 2021
11	11	"The Reunion Part 1"	August 15, 2021
12	12	"The Reunion Part 2"	August 22, 2021
