= Baddies season 2 =

2022 American reality television season

Baddies
- Season 2
- Starring: Natalie Nunn; Christina Salgado; Elliadria "Persuasian" Griffin; Jelaminah “Jela” Lanier; Chrisean "Rock" Malone; Gia "Rollie" Mayham; Sashanna "Slim" McLaurin; Anne Moore; Scotlynd “Scotty” Ryan; Briana “Bri” Walker
- No. of episodes: 17

Release
- Original network: Zeus Network
- Original release: June 12 – October 9, 2022

Season chronology
- ← Previous; Season 1 Next → Season 3

The second season of Baddies, officially titled Baddies South, aired on the Zeus Network from June 12, 2022, to October 9, 2022, and is filmed in the Southern region of the United States.

The season focuses on new faces amongst the Baddies group as they take The Dirty South by storm. It features Natalie Nunn, Elliadria "Persuasian" Griffin, Jelaminah Lanier, Chrisean "Rock" Malone, Gia “Rollie" Mayham, Sashanna "Slim" McLaurin, Anne Moore, Scotlynd Ryan and Briana Walker. Sidney Starr from the previous season appears in a recurring capacity throughout the series. Oliver, Salgado and Shanks appeared as guests.

The season had 17 episodes, including a three-part reunion special hosted by Trina and Janeisha John. This was the final season for Moore.

== Production and crew ==
The second season featured ten baddies as they toured around the Southern States of the US in a "decked-out" tour bus, with cameras capturing club performances and their luxurious vacations in mansions throughout various States. The majority of the cast from the previous season was replaced due to ongoing conflicts following the Baddies ATL Reunion.

The second season saw the cast travelling through the Southern states from Atlanta to Charlotte, Nashville, New Orleans, and Houston. Amongst the luxurious homes, hottest clubs and wildest parties, the season gave an insight into Southern culture, as the women prove why they are the "baddest" girls of the South.

== Cast ==
List of Baddies South main cast members
Main Cast	Age (Note: Age at time of filming)	First appearance	Hometown
Anne Moore	25	Baddies South	Miami, Florida
Briana “Bri” Walker	29	Bad Girls Club 17: East Meets West	Las Vegas, Nevada
Chrisean "Rock" Malone	22	Blue Girls Club 1	Baltimore, Maryland
Christina Salgado	32	Bad Girls Club 9: Mexico	Jersey City, New Jersey
Elliadria "Persuasian" Griffin	32	Bad Girls Club 16: Social Disruption	Dallas, Texas
Gia "Rollie" Mayham	29	One Mo' Chance 1	North Las Vegas, Nevada
Jelaminah "Jela" Lanier	32	Bad Girls Club 14: Back for More	Houston, Texas
Natalie Nunn	37	Bad Girls Club 4: Los Angeles	Oakland, California
Sashanna "Slim" McLaurin	24	One Mo' Chance 2	Salisbury, Maryland

List of Baddies South replacement cast members
Replacement Cast	Age	First appearance	Hometown	Replaced
Scotlynd “Scotty” Ryan	25	Baddies South	Charlotte, North Carolina	Christina

List of Baddies South supporting cast members
Supporting Cast	Age	First appearance	Hometown
Sarah Oliver	37	Bad Girls Club 11: Miami	Riverdale, Georgia
Sidney “Starr” Favors	33	Love & Hip Hop: New York 9	Chicago, Illinois

== Cast duration ==
Baddie	Episodes														Reunion		
Baddie	1	2	3	4	5	6	7	8	9	10	11	12	13	14	15	16	17
Anne	Featured																
Briana	Featured																
Jela	Featured																
Natalie	Featured																
Persuasian	Featured																
Rollie	Featured																
Slim	Featured																
Scotty				Entered (Note: Scotlynd replaced Christina.)	Featured												
Chrisean	Featured											removed (Note: Chrisean gets arrested by the U.S. Marshals.)		Returned (Note: Chrisean returns to the house and is featured for the rest of the episode.)	Featured		
Christina	Left (Note: Christina appeared in a confessional, but did not feature in the season, without explanation.)																
Supporting cast members
Sarah		Appeared (Note: Sarah has a conversation with Natalie at the house in Atlanta, resulting in an altercation.)															
Sidney									Supporting (Note: Sidney interrupts the cast at a club in Nashville.)			Supporting (Note: Sidney interrupts the cast at a party in Houston and showed up outside the reunion.)					

== Reunion ==
The season finale was followed by a three-part reunion special, hosted by Trina and Janeisha John, which was released from September 25, 2022, to October 9, 2022. Due to Salgado's absence from the season, she was not in attendance at the reunion. Oliver did not appear at the reunion taping. Starr showed up at the reunion taping unannounced.

Baddies S2 Reunion Seating Arrangement
Viewer's Left				HOSTS		Viewer's Right				
Briana	Persuasian	Jelaminah	Natalie	Trina	Janeisha John	Chrisean	Rollie	Slim	Anne	Scotty

Indicates a main cast member.

== After filming ==
- Natalie, Scotlynd, Rollie & Chrisean returned for the third season of Baddies West.
- Natalie, Scotlynd, Rollie, Jela & Bri were judges for the Baddies West Auditions.
- Natalie, Chrisean, Scotlynd & Rollie returned for the fourth season of Baddies East.
- Natalie, Chrisean, Scotlynd & Rollie were judges for the Baddies East Auditions.
- Natalie, Scotlynd, Rollie, Slim, Anne, Bri & Jela made guest appearances on Bad vs. Wild.
- Natalie & Scotlynd were judges for the Baddies Caribbean Auditions with Slim making a guest appearance.
- Natalie, Scotlynd, Rollie & Jela returned for the fifth season of Baddies Caribbean.
- Rollie had her own show titled Transforming Rollie.
- Natalie, Scotlynd, and Rollie appeared on Aunt Tea Podcast.
- Natalie, Scotlynd, Rollie and Jela were judges for the Baddies Midwest & Gone Wild Audtions.
- Natalie, Scotlynd, Rollie, Jela and Slim returned for the sixth season of Baddies Midwest with Chrisean making a special guest appearance and Sidney.
- Natalie, Scotlynd, Rollie and Jela were judges for the Baddies Africa Audtions.
- Natalie, Scotlynd and Rollie returned for the seventh season of Baddies Africa.
- Chrisean and Rollie appeared as guests on The Jason Lee Show.
- Natalie, Scotlynd, Jela, Bri, Persuasian, Chrisean, Rollie and Sarah returned for the eighth season of Baddies USA: Chapter One.
- Natalie, Rollie, and Persuasian returned for the ninth season, "Baddies USA: Chapter Two".

== Episodes ==
Baddies season 2 episodes
No. overall	No. in season	Title	Original release date
13	1	"Out With the Old, In With the New"	June 12, 2022
14	2	"I Cleaned You Up"	June 19, 2022
15	3	"You Don't Want These Problems"	June 26, 2022
16	4	"Looking Like Luther Vandross"	July 3, 2022
17	5	"Stop The Bus"	July 10, 2022
18	6	"All Good Things Must Come to an End"	July 17, 2022
19	7	"Cashville Ten-a-key!"	July 24, 2022
20	8	"A House Divided"	July 31, 2022
21	9	"Business Before Pleasure"	August 7, 2022
22	10	"Girls Gone Wild"	August 14, 2022
23	11	"Hide & Seek"	August 21, 2022
24	12	"A Baddie Keeps It Pushing"	August 28, 2022
25	13	"Into The Thick of It"	September 4, 2022
26	14	"The End of The Road"	September 11, 2022
27	15	"The Reunion: Part 1"	September 25, 2022
28	16	"The Reunion: Part 2"	October 2, 2022
29	17	"The Reunion: Part 3"	October 9, 2022
