= Bad Girls All-Star Battle season 2 =

Bad Girls All-Star Battle
- Season 2
- The cast of Bad Girls All-Star Battle (season 2)
- No. of episodes: 12

Release
- Original network: Oxygen
- Original release: January 7 – April 1, 2014

Season chronology
- ← Previous; Season 1

The Second season of Bad Girls All-Star Battle premiered on January 7, 2014, with Ray J returning as the host. This season has 16 girls competing, compared to its first season with 14 girls. The season's format has been noted for its enhanced challenges compared to the first season.

== Contestants ==
Bad Girl	Original season	Team	Outcome
Tiana Small	Season 11: Miami	Red	1st place
Sarah Oliver	Season 11: Miami	Red	2nd place
**Mehgan James**	Season 9: Mexico	Gold	3rd place
**Raquel Santiago**	Season 10: Atlanta	Red	4th place
Nancy Denise	Season 10: Atlanta	Gold	5th place
Shelly Hickman	Season 7: New Orleans	Red	6th place
Valentina Anyawu	Season 10: Atlanta	Gold	7th place
Elease Donovan	Season 8: Las Vegas	Red	8th place
Janelle Shanks	Season 11: Miami	Gold	9th place
Camilla Poindexter	Season 8: Las Vegas	Gold	10th place
Alicia Samaan	Season 10: Atlanta	Gold	11th place
Stephanie George	Season 10: Atlanta	Red	12th place
Amy Cieslowski	Season 8: Las Vegas	Gold	13th place
**Paula Hellens**	Season 10: Atlanta	Red	14th place
Andrea Bowman	Season 11: Miami	Red	15th place
**Danielle Victor**	Season 8: Las Vegas	Gold	16th place

^Note 1:Returning contestants are in bold.

== Contestant progress ==
Contestant	Episode										
Contestant	1	2 (Note: Andrea was nominated for elimination in Episode 2, but quit the competition the morning after she was nominated after feeling like her team was betraying her. Since she was originally nominated, Ray J came to the house and told the red team they had to nominate another person to take Andrea's place. The red team chose Elease. Paula was still however nominated.)	3	4	5	6	7	8	9	10	
Tiana	WIN	SAFE	WIN	SAFE	WIN	SAFE	SAFE	SAFE	SAFE	NOM	WINNER
Sarah	WIN	WON	WIN	SAFE	WIN	SAFE	SAFE	SAFE	SAFE	STAR	RUNNER-UP
Mehgan	SAFE	WIN	SAFE	WIN	SAFE	STAR	SAFE	NOM	NOM	NOM	THIRD
Rocky	CAPT	SAFE	WIN	SAFE	WIN	NOM	STAR	STAR	STAR	OUT	
Nancy	SAFE	WIN	SAFE	CAPT	SAFE	SAFE	NOM	SAFE	OUT		
Shelly	WIN	SAFE	WIN	WON	WIN	SAFE	SAFE	SAFE	OUT		
Valentina	SAFE	WIN	NOM	WIN	SAFE	SAFE	SAFE	OUT			
Elease	WIN	NOM	CAPT	NOM	CAPT	SAFE	OUT				
Janelle	SAFE	WIN	WON	WIN	WON	OUT					
Camilla	WON	CAPT	SAFE	WIN	NOM	OUT					
Alicia	SAFE	WIN	SAFE	WIN	OUT						
Stephanie	WIN	SAFE	WIN	OUT							
Amy	NOM	WIN	OUT								
Paula	WIN	OUT									
Andrea	WIN	QUIT									
Danni	OUT										

=== Notes ===
The contestant won the competition.
The contestant came in 2nd Place.
The contestant was eliminated by coming in last in the First Round of a 2 Round Competition.
The contestant won the Team's Challenge.
The contestant won the Bad Girls All Star Battle Challenge.
The contestant won both the Captain's Challenge and the Team's Challenge.
The contestant won the Captain's Challenge, but lost the Team's Challenge.
The contestant lost the Team's Challenge or Bad Girls All Star Battle Challenge, but was not put up for elimination.
The contestant was nominated for elimination and was in the bottom two or the bottom three.
The contestant was eliminated from the competition.
The contestant was nominated for elimination, but quit the competition.

== Voting history ==
	Episode 1	Episode 2	Episode 3	Episode 4	Episode 5	Episode 6	Episode 7	Episode 8	Episode 9	Episode 10	
	Episode 1	Episode 2	Episode 3	Episode 4	Episode 5	Episode 6	Episode 7	Episode 8	Episode 9	Elimination	Finale
Challenge Winner(s)	Red Team	Gold Team	Red Team	Gold Team	Red Team	Mehgan	Rocky	Rocky	Rocky	Sarah	Tiana
Team Captains	Camilla; **Rocky**	**Camilla**; Sarah	**Elease**; Janelle	**Nancy**; Shelly	**Elease**; Janelle	(none)					
Elimination Nominees	Amy; Danni	~~Andrea~~; Elease; Paula	Amy; Valentina	Elease; Stephanie	Alicia; Camilla	Camilla; **Janelle**; Rocky	Elease; Nancy	Mehgan; Valentina	**Mehgan**; Nancy; Shelly	Mehgan; Rocky; Tiana	(none)
Tiana	Danni	Lost Team; Challenge	Amy	Lost Team; Challenge	Camilla	Camilla, Janelle	Elease	Valentina	Nancy, Shelly	Rocky	**WINNER**
Sarah	Danni	Losing Team; Captain	Amy	Lost Team; Challenge	Camilla	Camilla, Janelle	Elease	Valentina	Nancy, Shelly	Rocky	**RUNNER-UP**
Mehgan	Lost Team; Challenge	Elease	Lost Team; Challenge	Stephanie	Lost Team; Challenge	Camilla, Rocky	Elease	Nominated	Nominated	Rocky	**THIRD**
Rocky	Amy	Lost Team; Challenge	Amy	Lost Team; Challenge	Alicia	Nominated	Elease	Valentina	Nancy, Shelly	Mehgan	Out (Episode 10)
Nancy	Lost Team; Challenge	Elease	Lost Team; Challenge	Stephanie	Lost Team; Challenge	Janelle, Rocky	Nominated	Valentina	Eliminated	Out (Episode 9)	
Shelly	Danni	Lost Team; Challenge	Valentina	Losing Team; Captain	Alicia	Camilla, Janelle	Elease	Valentina	Eliminated	Out (Episode 9)	
Valentina	Lost Team; Challenge	Paula	Nominated	Stephanie	Lost Team; Challenge	Camilla, Rocky	Elease	Eliminated	Out (Episode 8)		
Elease	Danni	Nominated	Valentina	Nominated	Alicia	Camilla, Janelle	Eliminated	Out (Episode 7)			
Janelle	Lost Team; Challenge	Paula	Losing Team; Captain	Stephanie	Losing Team; Captain	Eliminated	Out (Episode 6)				
Camilla	Losing Team; Captain	Paula	Lost Team; Challenge	Stephanie	Nominated	Eliminated	Out (Episode 6)				
Alicia	Lost Team; Challenge	Elease	Lost Team; Challenge	Stephanie	Eliminated	Out (Episode 5)					
Stephanie	Danni	Lost Team; Challenge	Amy	Eliminated	Out (Episode 4)						
Amy	Nominated	Paula	Eliminated	Out (Episode 3)							
Paula	Amy	Eliminated	Out (Episode 2)								
Andrea	Danni	Walked	Quit (Episode 2)								
Danni	Eliminated	Out (Episode 1)									
Walked	none	**Andrea**	none								
Eliminated	**Danni**; 6 of 8 votes to eliminate	**Paula**; 4 of 7 votes to eliminate	**Amy**; 4 of 6 votes to eliminate	**Stephanie**; 6 of 6 votes to eliminate	**Alicia**; 5 of 5 votes to eliminate	**Camilla**; 6 of 7 votes to eliminate	**Elease**; 6 of 6 votes to eliminate	**Valentina**; 5 of 5 votes to eliminate	**Shelly**; 3 of 3 votes to eliminate	**Rocky**; 3 of 4 votes to eliminate	**Mehgan**; Third
Eliminated	**Danni**; 6 of 8 votes to eliminate	**Paula**; 4 of 7 votes to eliminate	**Amy**; 4 of 6 votes to eliminate	**Stephanie**; 6 of 6 votes to eliminate	**Alicia**; 5 of 5 votes to eliminate	**Camilla**; 6 of 7 votes to eliminate	**Elease**; 6 of 6 votes to eliminate	**Valentina**; 5 of 5 votes to eliminate	**Shelly**; 3 of 3 votes to eliminate	**Rocky**; 3 of 4 votes to eliminate	**Sarah**; Runner-Up
Eliminated	**Danni**; 6 of 8 votes to eliminate	**Paula**; 4 of 7 votes to eliminate	**Amy**; 4 of 6 votes to eliminate	**Stephanie**; 6 of 6 votes to eliminate	**Alicia**; 5 of 5 votes to eliminate	**Janelle**; 5 of 7 votes to eliminate	**Elease**; 6 of 6 votes to eliminate	**Valentina**; 5 of 5 votes to eliminate	**Nancy**; 3 of 3 votes to eliminate	**Rocky**; 3 of 4 votes to eliminate	**Tiana**; Winner

=== Notes ===
- **^Note 1**: This bad girl won the team challenge.
- **^Note 2**: This bad girl won the captain's challenge and the team challenge. Their name is listed in **Bold** under "Team Captains"
- **^Note 3**: This bad girl won the captain's challenge but lost the team challenge.
- **^Note 4**: This bad girl won the battle challenge.
- **^Note 5**: This bad girl was nominated for elimination.
- **^Note 6**: Andrea and Paula were the initial nominees in episode 2, but Andrea quit the game, and the red team voted Elease as the replacement nominee.
- **^Note 7**: Episodes 6 and 9 were double eliminations. In a double elimination, the house, besides the battle challenge winner, votes for a third nominee. The person with the most votes becomes a nominee. This nominee is listed in **Bold**

== Episodes ==
=== Pushed to the Edge ===
First aired: January 7, 2014

Sixteen bad girls arrive to compete for the $100,000 cash prize. Returning cast members Rocky, Mehgan, Paula, and Danni all feel targeted because of their veteran rank. Old friends Camilla, Danni, and Amy immediately form an alliance, which Valentina suspects and plans to disband. The next day, the girls compete for team captain in "The Mud Challenge" which consisted of a limited amount of green balls lined up in a large mud pit. Host Ray J instructs each of the contestants to cross the finish line with a ball, which was reduced every round, in order to carry on to the next round. Those without a ball would be eliminated.

The first winner would be captain of the Gold Team, and second winner captain of the Red Team. Camilla and Rocky won the Captain's challenge and selected members to be a part of the Red and Gold teams. With the Gold and Red teams formed, the Team Challenge is up next. The Red Team pushes their way to victory, leaving the Gold Team to nominate two of their teammates for elimination. In an effort to break up Camilla's alliance, the Gold Team nominates Amy and Danni for elimination. The first elimination ceremony arrives. With 6 votes, Danni is the first Bad Girl eliminated from the competition.

Captain's Challenge

Round	Winners
1	Valentina, Stephanie, Alicia, Rocky, Andrea, Amy, Shelly, Tiana, Elease, Camilla
2	Alicia, Valentina, Camilla, Rocky, Stephanie, Andrea
3	Camilla, Rocky

The contestant won Team Captain

Team Challenge

Ray J instructs each team to push the other team off a platform above water by pushing a wall that would dump them into the water.

- Winner: Red Team
- Team Captain: Rocky
- Bottom 2: Danni: 6 votes and Amy: 2 votes
- Eliminated: Danni

=== Bad Girl Breakout ===
First aired: January 14, 2014

After the previous elimination the Gold teams feels relieved. Sarah suspects an alliance between Paula and opposing team member Mehgan, which causes a rift between the Red Team. Camilla and Elease form a secret alliance that no one suspects. Due to health concerns Shelly decides not to compete in the Captains Challenge, but participate in the Team Challenge to support her team. The girls arrive to the "Give Me the Money Honey" Captain's Challenge. Each team is instructed to lather up in honey to collect coins and deposit them inside of the piggy bank. The person with the most coins collected wins team captain. Sarah and Camilla win the captain's challenge.

For the Team Challenge, each team was instructed to free each team member from 6 barriers that held each team. One member of the team would use a saw to free the first teammate from the barrier behind wooden bars. Once that teammate is released, those two must use bolt cutters to create a hole in a chain link fence, to free the third teammate. Those three team members would then get a ladder to throw over a wooden wall to free the fourth teammate. The four teammates would then knock the solid concrete wall into pieces using a sledgehammer to free the fifth teammate. Those five teammates would then use the battering ram to bust the metal door and free the sixth teammate.

For the final barrier, the remaining six members must chisel their way through a dry rock wall to free the seventh teammate. Once every barrier is broken, the team that rings the bell first wins the Team Challenge. Tension arises with Andrea, as her team feel offended with her actions during the Team Challenge. The Gold Team is victorious and causes the Red Team to nominate Andrea and Paula. Andrea quits the competition, forcing a revote, with Paula and Elease being nominees. Elease decides to plea with the Gold Team. During elimination Paula gets emotional as she is eliminated.

Captain's Challenge
Give Me The Money Honey

Place	Contestant
1	Sarah
2	Andrea
Place	Contestant
1	Camilla
2	Alicia

The contestant won the challenge and became the Team captain.
The contestant placed second in the challenge

Team Challenge

Barrier	Unrestrained teammates	Confined teammate	Team Winner
1	Alicia; Sarah	Camilla; Rocky	Gold
2	Camilla, Alicia; Rocky, Sarah	Mehgan; Andrea	Gold
3	Camilla, Alicia, Mehgan, Rocky, Sarah, Andrea	Nancy; Shelly	Gold
4	Camilla, Alicia, Mehgan, Nancy, Rocky, Sarah, Andrea, Shelly	Amy; Paula	Gold
5	Camilla, Alicia, Mehgan, Nancy, Amy; Rocky, Sarah, Andrea, Shelly, Paula	Valentina; Tiana	Gold
6	Camilla, Alicia, Mehgan, Nancy, Amy, Valentina; Rocky, Sarah, Andrea, Shelly, Paula, Tiana	Janelle; Elease	Gold

- Stephanie was chosen to sit out at the Team Challenge

- Winner: Gold Team
- Team Captain: Camilla
- Quit: Andrea
- Bottom 2: Elease: 3 votes and Paula: 4 votes
- Eliminated: Paula

The Team won the challenge and became safe from elimination.

=== What a Tangled Web ===
First aired: January 21, 2014

Camilla and Amy worry about being outnumbered by the Gold Team. From the previous challenge, Amy suffers injuries on her legs. The girls arrive to the Bad Girls Brain Game, a Captain's Challenge. Host Ray J instructs each girl to stand inside an open stall to answer questions on geography, pop culture, trivia, and spelling. Every girl eliminated is showered in cow brains and cow blood. The remaining teammates advance to the next round, until the girl with the most correct answers wins team captain. Janelle and Elease respectively win team captain.

The Red team worry about Elease's loyalty to them because of her interactions with the Gold Team. For the Team Challenge, Ray J instructs each girl to untangle themselves from knotted ropes while harnessed 30 feet in the air. The Gold Team, with more teammates, pick Alicia to sit out. The Red Team wins, which shocks Elease who attempted to hijack the challenge. Out of frustration, Nancy and Camilla destroy Elease belongings.

Elease attempts to explain herself to Camilla which ends in a fight. Elease is now vulnerable, and becomes a target to everyone. During nominations for Gold team things get heated as Amy confronts her team about their loyalty. Valentina and Amy are put up as nominees. Meanwhile, celebrating victory, Rocky injures her knee yet decides to continue throughout the competition. Amy is eliminated and Camilla's alliance is weakened. Later, Camilla decides to make amends with Elease.

Captain's Challenge
Bad Girl Brain Games

Place	Contestant
1	Janelle
2	Alicia
Place	Contestant
1	Elease
2	Tiana, Stephanie

Team Challenge

Each team is harnessed 30 feet in the air and must untangle themselves.

- Winner: Red Team
- Team Captain: Elease
- Bottom 2: Valentina: 2 votes and Amy: 4 votes
- Eliminated: Amy

=== Unbeweaveable ===
First aired: January 28, 2014

The gold team feel pressured to win from the previous elimination. Elease is now a target to both teams. Rocky's knee injury cause her to be unable to compete in the Captain's Challenge. Ray J instructs each team to complete an obstacle course that involves a puzzle, which unlocks a key, to open a box with heels inside. Then to dress in costume to reel in a handbag hooked on a rope. The last course event is an eating competition. Each contender that finished last couldn't advance to the next course. Shelly and Nancy win team captain.

Valentina feels Nancy will put her up for nomination because of previous nominations. For the "Tug Of Weave", Team Challenge each team must collect weaves in a one-on-one freestyle tug of war inside a sandpit. Mehgan and Stephanie end up needing medical attention after the challenge, causing the Red Team to hold nominations.

Once nominations take place, Stephanie and Elease are put up. Elease feels as though Tiana should be put up because of her performance during the challenges. The Red Team hope for Elease to be sent home and use Stephanie as a decoy to ensure that. Stephanie gets eliminated. Afterwards Tiana confronts Elease for being in an alliance with the Gold Team.

Captain's Challenge

Course	Red Team: winners	Eliminated	Gold Team: winners	Eliminated
1:Puzzle	Shelly; Tiana; Stephanie; Elease	Sarah	Nancy; Alicia; Valentina; Janelle	Mehgan; Camilla
2: Handbag Reel	Shelly; Elease; Tiana	Stephanie	Nancy; Valentina; Janelle	Alicia
3:Eating Competition	Shelly; Tiana	Elease	Nancy; Valentina	Janelle
4: Frozen Drink Challenge	Shelly	Tiana	Nancy	Valentina

The contestant was eliminated for finishing last on the course

Team Challenge
Each girl is to play in a one on one, freestyle tug of war using a small braided piece of hair weave. The team captain decided the match ups.

Round	Match Up	Winner
1	Shelly vs. Alicia	Alicia
2	Nancy vs. Tiana	Nancy
3	Sarah vs. Mehgan	Sarah
4	Janelle vs. Stephanie	Stephanie
5	Camilla vs. Elease	Camilla
6	Shelly vs Valentina	Shelly
7	Alicia vs Sarah	Alicia

The contestant won a weave for the Red Team.
The contestant won a weave for the Gold Team.

- Rocky was prohibited from both challenges due to an knee injury
- Mehgan and Stephanie both received medical attention during the Team Challenge, causing the Red Team nominations to be held a day after.
- Winner: Gold Team
- Team Captain: Nancy
- Bottom 2: Elease: 0 votes and Stephanie: 4 votes
- Eliminated: Stephanie

=== Sometimes You Have to Play Dirty ===
First aired: February 4, 2014

Red Team discuss Elease being in an alliance with the opposing team. Camilla and Nancy start to get romantically involved, but others assume Camilla has ulterior motives. For the Captain's Challenge the girls are assigned a male partner to hang onto, while he is harnessed onto a crane held over a harbor, testing their endurance and strength. Camilla unsuccessfully tries to bargain with Janelle to drop down. Janelle wins team captain. Elease wins the Captain's challenge, which infuriates her team.

The girls head to the "Battle Bowl" Team Challenge, which Ray J instructs the girls will play a game of flag football in the mud. The referee flips a coin and the Gold Team starts the game. Sarah injures herself, causing Mehgan to confront Sarah and the two almost end up in an altercation. Janelle becomes frustrated with Alicia for taking her position as the center. Though suffering from a bad knee, Rocky leads the Red Team to victory.

Janelle and Nancy discuss nomination. Janelle is unsure whom to nominate. Nancy tries to convince Janelle to save Camilla. Mehgan worries that Camilla's relationship with Nancy isn't genuine. During nomination, the Gold Team decide to vote Alicia, leaving a tiebreaker between Camilla and Mehgan. Team captain Janelle nominates Camilla. Elease notices that Alicia develops a suspicious new friendship with the Red Team after she was nominated. Camilla worries and confides in her secret alliance. Elease convinces the Red team that Alicia is a threat.

During elimination, Ray J asks each girl why they should stay in the competition. As Alicia explains herself, she calls out Janelle for being "weak", which causes an argument between the two. Alicia mentions Mehgan for knowing how to "play the game". Camilla then calls out Mehgan for being "weak and fake". Camilla walks off the elimination platform to confront Mehgan. As tensions settle, Alicia is eliminated from the competition.

Captain's Challenge

Team	Place					
Team	1	2	3	4	5	6
Gold	Janelle	Camilla	Valentina	Alicia	Nancy	Mehgan
Red	Elease	Rocky	Sarah	Tiana	Shelly	

'Team Challenge'
Battle Bowl

Final
Red Team	19
Gold Team	14

- Winner: Red Team
- Team Captain: Elease
- Bottom 2: Alicia: 3 votes and Camilla: 0 votes
- Eliminated: Alicia

=== All Hail The Queen ===
First aired February 11, 2014

As the episode begins, Janelle and Mehgan are seen having a conversation about the previous elimination. Ray J comes into the house revealing to the girls that there are no more teams and that there will be only one battle challenge, and gifted the girls new uniforms. Though teams were disbanded, Red Team members continued to be an alliance. The girls arrive to the tournament style Battle Challenge. Ray J reveals that there will be a double elimination. The winner of the challenge will be able to nominate two contestants.

In the Battle Challenge, consisting of 3 rounds, each girl was matched up in a one on-one battle, while harnessed back to back by a 7-foot rope. The girl who scores a basket inside the bin first wins that round and advances onto the next. Rocky disqualifies herself and Nancy from advancing to the next round, after being unable to score her basket. With a strong strategy Mehgan wins against Shelly, and is the winner of the Battle Challenge. With Mehgan winning, the Red Team becomes fearful.

Rocky feels she will be considered a nominee due to Mehgan wanting vengeance for her elimination last season. Janelle tries to persuade Mehgan to keep Rocky, but Mehgan is obstinate to nominate Camilla and Rocky. Camilla announces she will not plead her case to Mehgan during a conversation with Nancy. Unwillingly, Camilla tries to convince Mehgan to reconsider nominating her for elimination. Sarah, realizing that a third person will be put up for nomination, discusses with her alliance that Janelle would be the best choice, in order to disband Mehgan's alliance.

Mehgan decides to put Camilla and Rocky up for elimination. Ray J introduces "Bad Girls Revenge" which allowed every girl, except Mehgan, to vote a third girl for elimination. The girl's vote results in a tie between Sarah and Janelle, leaving Elease as the deciding factor. Elease sticks to her alliance, voting for Janelle to be put up for elimination. Rocky has a conversation with Elease and convinces her that Camilla is more of a threat to her than she thinks, and that it would be her best interest to send her home.

Before elimination, Camilla and Elease have a conversation in the bathroom where Camilla makes sure she's secure with Elease. During elimination, as Camilla makes her exit, Camilla attacks Elease from behind. After tensions settle Janelle leaves the show, leaving Nancy and Mehgan short of a strong alliance.

Quarter-finals
Elease	Lose
Valentina	Win
Mehgan	Win
Sarah	Lose
Camilla	Win
Tiana	Lose
Janelle	Lose
Shelly	Win

Semi-finals
Mehgan	Win
Valentina	Lose
Shelly	Win
Camilla	Lose

Final
Shelly	Lose
Mehgan	Win

- Rocky and Nancy were disqualified as, Rocky was unable to score in the bin.

- Battle Challenge Winner: Mehgan
- Bottom 3: Camilla: 6 votes Janelle: 5 votes Rocky: 3 votes
- Eliminated: Camilla and Janelle

=== Twerk It Out ===
First aired February 25, 2014

As the episode starts, Sarah, Tiana, and Rocky discuss what's to come and that they will eventually have to vote each other out. Nancy feels lonely since Camilla is eliminated. Elease feels relieved since Camilla is gone, and feels she can be trusted within her alliance. Elease states Rocky is her target. Mehgan and Nancy all believe Rocky is only keeping Sarah and Tiana around, because she has an athletic advantage. The girls arrive to the Battle Challenge "Bad Girls Pentathlon". The first event orders the girls to twerk as fast as possible with pedometers on their back, a luggage toss, hurdle jump in heels, stiletto standing, and a money booth.

Unsurprisingly, Rocky wins the pentathlon. Tiana discusses how she believes Elease would be disloyal to their alliance if she had won, in which Shelly thinks otherwise. Rocky and Shelly get into a heated argument. In the kitchen, Tiana asks Elease who would she had put up for nomination. Elease states she'd choose someone from the Red and Gold alliance. Confiding in Rocky, Tiana tells her of Elease's statement, which persuades Rocky to nominate Elease.

During a trip to the club, two guys ask Nancy and Sarah to dance for them and begin to throw money. Rocky begins to collect some of the money thrown on the floor, which causes Nancy to confront Rocky about it. Rocky unsure whom to nominate, is stuck between Elease, Mehgan, and Nancy to go up for nomination. Worried she'll be nominated, Mehgan convinces Rocky not to nominate her. In return Rocky asks Mehgan to vow she won't nominate her anytime.

Rocky decides to nominate Nancy and Elease, which worries Elease. Mehgan tells Elease that she won't vote for her to go home during a conversation in the closet. During eliminations, Ray J asks Elease to plead her case and she states "[Rocky] She plays dirty and shady", which causes a small argument between the two. Elease is eliminated from the competition with a unanimous decision.

- Bad Girls Pentathlon Placements

Winner : Rocky

Runner-Up: Elease

2nd Runner-Up : Valentina

- Bottom 2: Elease: 6 votes and Nancy: 0 votes
- Eliminated: Elease

=== Nobody Eats For Free ===
First aired March 4, 2014

Mehgan feels relieved Camilla is sent home because it restrengthens her alliance with Nancy. Shelly worries she won't win, and relies on her Red Team alliance to save her if she's unable to. Tiana talks to Rocky about how her brothers motivate her during the challenges. The girls head to the Battle Challenge, "The Price of Beauty" where each girl goes through five eating stunts, that will entail ingesting vile animal parts and blended concoctions, in order to gain face pieces of themselves, to cover a barefaced self-portrait.

Shelly puts up little effort to win, and goes to cheer on Rocky during the challenge. Rocky wins her second Battle Challenge, and is annoyed with Shelly's performance and reliance on their alliance. Rocky discusses who she wants to nominate, and targets Valentina due to her athletic ability. Tiana gets emotional, due to her losing every challenge. Meanwhile, Mehgan becomes annoyed with Rocky and her alliance because she feels Shelly and Sarah aren't independent and rely on Rocky, and feels Rocky keeps them around because their easy competition. Rocky set on nominating Valentina, discusses with Sarah how Mehgan isn't a threat to her, and confronts Shelly on being a quitter.

During a visit to the club, Sarah notices a surprising new found bond between Mehgan and Shelly. Meanwhile, Valentina spirals out of control after too many drinks. The Red Team alliance discusses how Shelly is floating by and question her loyalty to their alliance. Rocky decides to nominate Valentina and Mehgan. Valentina is sent home with 3 votes. After elimination, Mehgan and Nancy are heated at the Red Team's reliance on their alliance and Mehgan plots her revenge.

- Battle Challenge Winner: Rocky
- Bottom 2: Valentina: 3 votes Mehgan: 2 votes
- Eliminated: Valentina

=== The Battle Dome ===
First aired March 11, 2014

Ray J wakes the girls up early to ask them what they want to do with the money. Then they go to their next challenge called Bad Girls Battle Dome, which will be played in 3 different rounds. The first round is called Push Over. Players have to push their opponent to get to their flag.

The second round is called The Diamond Ring. The 3 girls who win the push over challenge, will compete in this challenge. Each player holds onto the ring and tries to rip it away from the other girls. The first girl to let go of the ring will be eliminated.

The final round is called Wrap Up. The final 2 girls have their right arms tied together by a rope thing and will try and pull the other girl to their specific flag. The girl who gets to their flag first, will win the challenge.

Push Over: Nancy vs. Tiana. Winner: Nancy. Eliminated: Tiana Sarah vs. Rocky. Winner: Rocky. Eliminated: Sarah. Mehgan vs. Shelly. Winner: Shelly. Eliminated: Mehgan.

The Diamond Ring: Nancy vs. Rocky vs. Shelly Winners: Rocky and Shelly. Eliminated: Nancy

Wrap Up: Rocky vs. Shelly Winner: Rocky Eliminated: Shelly

- Battle Challenge Winner: Rocky
- Bottom 3: Mehgan: 0 votes Nancy: 3 votes Shelly: 3 votes
- Eliminated: Nancy, Shelly

=== Winner Take All ===
First aired March 18, 2014

- First Place Winner: Tiana
- Second Place: Sarah
- Third Place: Mehgan
- Eliminated: Raquel

== U.S. Ratings ==
No.	Title	Original release date	U.S. viewers (millions)
1	"Pushed to the Edge"	January 7, 2014	1.04
2	"Bad Girl Breakout"	January 14, 2014	0.95
3	"What a Tangled Web"	January 21, 2014	0.96
4	"Unbeweavable"	January 28, 2014	0.99
5	"Sometimes You Have to Play Dirty"	February 4, 2014	0.97
6	"All Hail The Queen"	February 11, 2014	0.88
7	"Twerk It Out"	February 25, 2014	1.04
8	"Nobody Eats For Free"	March 4, 2014	0.98
9	"The Battle Dome"	March 11, 2014	1.04
10	"Winner Take All"	March 18, 2014	1.04
11	"Reunion — Part 1"	March 25, 2014	1.13
12	"Reunion — Part 2"	April 1, 2014	1.08
