= Mehgan James =

American TV personality and rapper

- Born: Mehgan Elisse James; February 11, 1990 (age 36); Houston, Texas, U.S.
- Education: University of Houston (BA)
- Occupations: Television personality; rapper
- Years active: 2008-present
- Television: Bad Girls Club; Bad Girls All-Star Battle; Basketball Wives; Marriage Boot Camp: Reality Stars

Mehgan James is an American television personality and rapper, best known for her appearance on the ninth season of Oxygen network's hit reality television series Bad Girls Club.

== Early life ==
Mehgan Elisse James was born on February 11, 1990 in Houston, Texas and grew up in Texas City, Texas. James attended and graduated from the University of Houston, where she earned a bachelor's degree in communication.

== Career ==
In 2008, James competed on 50 Cent's MTV reality television series 50 Cent: The Money and the Power. She was eighteen at the time, and placed on the Team Power team. James was the youngest contestant on the show, and ended up as the longest-lasting female and earned fourth place overall.

In 2012, James starred in the ninth season of Oxygen network's hit reality television series Bad Girls Club. James voluntarily left the show in the eighth episode after a physical altercation with cast members Falen Ghirmai and Rimanelli Mellal. James appeared on the Bad Girls Club spin offs Bad Girls All Star Battle season 1 where she placed twelfth and on Bad Girls All Star Battle season 2 where she placed third in the season finale. James also co-hosted Bad Girls Club Top 10 OMG Moments seasons 6-10.

In 2015, James joined the main cast of the VH1 reality television series, Basketball Wives LA season 4. In 2016, James was set to join the cast of spin-off Love & Hip Hop: Houston, but the show never aired after filming was cut short. In 2018, James starred in WE TV's Marriage Boot Camp season 11: Reality Stars 8, alongside her then-partner DeAndre Perry. She also starred in the first season of Mind Your Business with Mahisha in 2018. In 2021, she made a guest appearance in Zeus Network web series Baddies ATL. She also starred in reality series Notorious Queens in 2021.

In 2022, James began hosting her own podcast titled The Hollywood Group Chat. In 2023, she starred in Basketball Wives Orlando. In 2024, James was the executive producer for Roku reality series The Real Side Chicks of Los Angeles.

== Personal life ==
Her brother, Brian Allen, plays professional football for the Pittsburgh Steelers.

James has previously dated NBA player Kedrick Brown and college football player DeAndre Perry.

== Filmography ==
Film and television
Year	Title	Role	Notes
2008-2009	50 Cent: The Money and the Power	Self; contestant	4th place, 9 episodes
2012	Bad Girls Club season 9: Mexico	Self; cast member	12 episodes
2013	Bad Girls Club Top 10 OMG Moments 6-10	Self; co-host	TV special
2013	Bad Girls All Star Battle season 1	Self; contestant	12th place, 3 episodes
2013	Bad Girls All Star Battle: Twinstant Replay	Self; guest	TV special
2014	Bad Girls All Star Battle season 2	Self; contestant	3rd place, 12 episodes
2014	AfterBuzz TV: Bad Girls All Star Battle season 2	Self; guest	1 episode
2014	The Holy Spoof	Mehgan	Short film
2015	Dumbish	M.J.	Short film
2015	Reality Television Awards	Self; co-host	TV special
2015	Minay TV	Self; guest	1 episode
2015	Basketball Wives LA season 4	Self; cast member	13 episodes
2017	The Fighters Prayer	Glory	
2017	Hollywood Unlocked with Jason Lee Uncensored	Self; guest	1 episode
2018	Marriage Boot Camp season 11: Reality Stars 8	Self; cast member	11 episodes
2018	Mind Your Business with Mahisha	Self; cast member	8 episodes
2019	Swallow It	Self; guest	1 episode, podcast
2021	Wild 'n Out	Self; guest	1 episode
2021	Baddies ATL	Self; guest	3 episodes, web series
2021	Notorious Queens	Self; cast member	6 episodes, web series
2021	Blood Sacrifice	Temptation	
2022	Hip Hop Family Christmas Wedding	Waitress #1	
2022–present	The Hollywood Groupchat	Self; host	Podcast
2023	Masquerade	Alexis	
2023	BET Hip Hop Awards	Self; guest	TV special
2023	Sidewalks Entertainment	Self; guest	1 episode
2023	Basketball Wives Orlando	Self; cast member	
2023	Dish Nation	Self; guest	1 episode
2024	Young and Reckless	Self; reunion host	
2024	Bad vs. Wild	Self; team captain	1 episode, web series
2024	The Real Side Chicks of Los Angeles	Self; executive producer	3 episodes, web series

== Discography ==
Singles
Year	Title	Notes
2021	Playbook	
2021	All I Want for Christmas	
2022	Hello	
2022	Just Fuckin	
2022	Spinnin' Em'	featuring Lucci Vee
2023	Motion	

EP
Year	Title	Notes
2025	Just for Fun	Debut EP

== Awards and accomplishments ==
Bad Girls Club Hall of Fame

- Greatest season (2015)
