= Baddies season 3 =

2023 American reality television season

Baddies
- Season 3
- Starring: Natalie Nunn; Chrisean Rock; Gia "Rollie" Mayham; Scotlynd “Scotty” Ryan; Damerlin "Biggie" Baez; Suzanne "Stunna Girl" Brown; Atasha "Tommie Lee" Jefferson; Loren "Lo London" Jordan; Cleo "DJ Sky High Baby" Rahman; Monique "Razor Behaviour" Samuels; Catya “Cat” Washington
- No. of episodes: 16

Release
- Original network: Zeus Network
- Original release: January 22 – May 21, 2023

Season chronology
- ← Previous; Season 2 Next → Season 4

The third season of Baddies, officially titled Baddies West, aired on the Zeus Network from January 22, 2023, to May 21, 2023, and is filmed in the Western region of the United States, visiting cities Los Angeles, Las Vegas, Phoenix, Oakland, Portland and the U.S. Virgin Islands.

The season focuses on the personal lives and relationships of some of the "baddest" and "wildest" Baddies yet, including Natalie Nunn, Chrisean "Rock" Malone, Goldie "Rollie" Martin, Scotlynd Ryan, Damerlin "Biggie" Baez, Stunna Girl, Lo London, Tommie Lee, Cleo "DJ Sky High Baby" Rahman, Monique "Razor" Samuels and Catya Washington. The season had 19 episodes, including a three-part auditions special and a two-part reunion special hosted by Janeisha John and Stevie J.

== Production and crew ==
The third season featured eleven baddies as they toured around the Western States of the US in a "decked-out" tour bus, with cameras capturing club performances and their luxurious vacations in mansions throughout various States.

On December 26, 2022, an official teaser for the season was released. On January 15, 2023, the final super trailer was released.

The season shows the cast as they travel from Los Angeles to Las Vegas, Phoenix, Oakland, and Portland and St Croix, U.S. Virgin Islands. Whilst travelling, some friendships crumble as other relationships form, strengthen and blossom.

== Cast ==
=== Auditions ===
Prior to the release of the show's third season, a three-part auditions special was aired from October 23, 2022, to November 6, 2022. Natalie Nunn and main stage judges Tommie Lee and Sukihana, pre-screen judges Jelaminah Lanier, Goldie "Rollie" Martin, Scotlynd Ryan and Briana Walker from the show's second season, and host Janeisha John, sought out cast members for the upcoming season.

List of Baddies West main cast members
| Main Cast | Age (Note: Age at time of filming) | First appearance | Hometown |
|---|---|---|---|
| Atasha “Tommie Lee” Jefferson | 38 | Love & Hip Hop: Atlanta 5 | Newark, New Jersey |
| Catya “Cat” Washington | 36 | Bad Girls Club 5: Miami | Philadelphia, Pennsylvania |
| Chrisean "Rock" Malone | 22 | Blue Girls Club 1 | Baltimore, Maryland |
| Cleo "DJ Sky High Baby" Rahman | 30 | Bad Boys: Los Angeles | Baltimore, Maryland |
| Damerlin "Biggie" Baez | 26 | Baddies West Auditions | Providence, Rhode Island |
| Gia “Rollie” Mayham | 30 | One Mo' Chance 1 | North Las Vegas, Nevada |
| Loren "Lo London" Jordan | 33 | Bad Girls Club 12: Chicago | Mobile, Alabama |
| Monique "Razor" Samuels | 27 | Baddies West Auditions | Chillum, Maryland |
| Natalie Nunn | 38 | Bad Girls Club 4: Los Angeles | Oakland, California |
| Scotlynd “Scotty” Ryan | 26 | Baddies South | Charlotte, North Carolina |
| Suzanne “Stunna Girl” Brown | 24 | Baddies West Auditions | Sacramento, California |

== Cast duration ==
| Cast member | Episodes | | | | | | | | | | | | | | Reunion | |
| Cast member | 1 | 2 | 3 | 4 | 5 | 6 | 7 | 8 | 9 | 10 | 11 | 12 | 13 | 14 | 15 | 16 |
|---|---|---|---|---|---|---|---|---|---|---|---|---|---|---|---|---|
| Biggie | Featured | Featured | Featured | Featured | Featured | Featured | Featured | Featured | Featured | Featured | Featured | Featured | Featured | Featured | Featured | Featured |
| Cat | Featured | Featured | Featured | Absent | Featured | Featured | Featured | Featured | Featured | Featured | Featured | Featured | Featured | Featured | Featured | Featured |
| DJ Sky | Featured | Featured | Featured | Featured | Featured | Featured | Featured | Featured | Featured | Featured | Featured | Featured | Featured | Featured | Featured | Featured |
| Lo London | Featured | Featured | Featured | Featured | Featured | Featured | Featured | Featured | Featured | Featured | Featured | Featured | Featured | Featured | Featured | Featured |
| Natalie | Featured | Featured | Featured | Featured | Featured | Featured | Featured | Featured | Featured | Featured | Featured | Featured | Featured | Featured | Featured | Featured |
| Razor | Featured | Featured | Featured | Featured | Featured | Featured | Featured | Featured | Featured | Featured | Featured | Featured | Featured | Featured | | |
| Rollie | Featured | Featured | Featured | Featured | Featured | Featured | Featured | Featured | Featured | Featured | Featured | Featured | Featured | Featured | Featured | Featured |
| Scotty | Featured | Featured | Featured | Featured | Featured | Featured | Featured | Featured | Featured | Featured | Featured | Featured | Featured | Featured | Featured | Featured |
| Stunna Girl | Featured | Featured | Featured | Absent | Featured | Featured | Featured | Featured | Featured | Featured | Featured | Featured | Featured | Featured | Featured | Featured |
| Tommie | Featured | Appeared (Note: Tommie appeared only by via FaceTime with Natalie.) | Featured | Featured | Featured | Featured | Featured | Featured | Featured | Featured | Featured | Featured | Featured | Featured | Featured | Featured |
| Chrisean | Featured | Featured | Featured | Featured | Featured | Featured | Absent | Featured | Featured | Featured | Left (Note: Chrisean left the show after an altercation with Natalie.) | | Appeared (Note: Chrisean performed at the last tour stop and delivered her final thoughts of the season in her confessional.) | Appeared | | Appeared (Note: Chrisean sent in a video message in physical absence.) |

== Reunion ==
The final episode was followed by a two-part reunion special, hosted by John and Stevie J, which was released from May 14, 2023 to May 21, 2023. Chrisean and Razor were not present at the reunion, with Chrisean's announcement to the cast that she was expecting her first child via a pre-recorded video, and Razor missing her flight, hence their absence from the special.

Baddies S3 Reunion Seating Arrangement
| Viewer's Left | | | | HOSTS | | Viewer's Right | | | | |
|---|---|---|---|---|---|---|---|---|---|---|
| Stunna Girl | Scotty | Rollie | Natalie | Stevie J | Janeisha John | Tommie Lee | Biggie | Lo London | Catya | DJ Sky |

Indicates a main cast member.

== After filming ==
- Natalie, Scotlynd, Chrisean, Rollie, Biggie, Stunna Girl & DJ Sky High Baby all returned for the fourth season of Baddies East with Catya making a guest appearance.
- Natalie, Lo London, Scotlynd, Catya, Rollie, Chrisean, & Biggie were judges for the Baddies East Auditions.
- Natalie, Lo London, Catya, Rollie, Scotlynd, Biggie, & DJ Sky High Baby all made guest appearances on Bad vs. Wild.
- Natalie, Scotlynd, Rollie, & Biggie all returned for the fifth season of Baddies Caribbean with Tommie making a special guest appearance and DJ Sky High Baby.
- Natalie, Scotlynd and Biggie were judges for the Baddies Caribbean Auditions.
- Rollie had her own show titled Transforming Rollie.
- Stunna Girl had her own network titled RedRum and show titled Stunna Girls.
- Natalie, Scotlynd, and Rollie appeared on Aunt Tea Podcast.
- Natalie, Scotlynd, Rollie and Biggie were judges for the Baddies Midwest & Gone Wild Audtions.
- Natalie, Scotlynd, Rollie and Biggie returned for the sixth season of Baddies Midwest with Chrisean and Tommie making special guest appearances.
- Natalie, Scotlynd, Rollie and Biggie were judges for the Baddies Africa Audtions.
- Natalie, Scotlynd, Rollie, Tommie and Stunna Girl returned for the seventh season of Baddies Africa while Biggie is on timeout.
- Chrisean and Rollie appeared as guests on The Jason Lee Show.
- Natalie, Scotlynd, Rollie, Chrisean, Tommie, Biggie, Catya, Lo London and DJ Sky High Baby returned for the eighth season of Baddies USA.

== Episodes ==
Baddies season 3 episodes
| No. overall | No. in season | Title | Original release date |
|---|---|---|---|
| - | SP101 | "Auditions: Part 1" | October 23, 2022 |
"Season 2 stars Rollie, Jela, Scotlynd and Bri pre-screen new potential Baddie cast members."
| - | SP102 | "Auditions: Part 2" | October 30, 2022 |
"It’s time to face Natalie, Tommie, and Sukihana on the mainstage. The auditioners have no idea what is in store."
| - | SP103 | "Auditions: Part 3" | November 6, 2022 |
"Some girls just can't handle the heat and the judges are not taking it easy on them."
| 30 | 1 | "The Wild Wild West" | January 22, 2023 |
"Natalie and the Baddies of the West come together for an epic promo shoot."
| 31 | 2 | "Welcome to LA" | January 29, 2023 |
"The ladies head to the Los Angeles Baddie house with tensions already on high alert."
| 32 | 3 | "Stunna vs Everybody" | February 5, 2023 |
"Things continue to go left as the girls express their frustrations with Stunna Girl."
| 33 | 4 | "What Happens in Vegas..." | February 12, 2023 |
"The ladies take turn up to another level on the Baddie Bus."
| 34 | 5 | "Stranger In The House" | February 19, 2023 |
"Natalie attempts to bring Tommie and Stunna together for a talk but the ladies have little to say."
| 35 | 6 | "Here Comes The Bad Luck" | February 26, 2023 |
"The Baddies make sure that minor problems don't stop big business."
| 36 | 7 | "Who's Bad?" | March 5, 2023 |
"Tommie puts some of the Baddies to the test on the way to Phoenix."
| 37 | 8 | "I'm The Special Guest" | March 12, 2023 |
"Things get heated as the Baddies discuss how to split their bag."
| 38 | 9 | "A Bad Supper" | March 19, 2023 |
"The Baddies come together for a dinner that they won’t soon forget."
| 39 | 10 | "Messy Bestie" | March 26, 2023 |
"An upset Natalie turns on her good friend."
| 40 | 11 | "Baddie Missing" | April 2, 2023 |
"Natalie and Scotty discuss the future of their friendship."
| 41 | 12 | "Back to the Bay" | April 9, 2023 |
"The Baddies head back to where it started...the Bay Area."
| 42 | 13 | "Tear the Club Up" | April 16, 2023 |
"Things become active in the Bay."
| 43 | 14 | "From The Bay to the Islands" | April 23, 2023 |
"After a close call in Oakland the Baddies head to St. Croix."
| 44 | 15 | "Reunion: Part 1" | May 14, 2023 |
"The Baddies reunite in Los Angeles where things immediately go up!"
| 45 | 16 | "Reunion: Part 2" | May 21, 2023 |
"Things become more intense once producer Tommie Lee joins the stage."
