= Drea Dominique =

American TV personality and rapper

Andrea Dominique Jones, also known as Drea Dominique, is an American model, rapper, singer-songwriter, and reality TV personality.

== Early life ==
Andrea Dominique Jones was born in Bethpage, New York to an African American father and Puerto Rican mother. She was raised in between San Diego, California and Bethpage. Dominique grew up having a passion for music. She was imspired by Aaliyah and her father, who was a DJ. In school, she was in choir.

== Career ==
Dominique started modeling young. In magazines, she was models for KING Magazine, Vixens Magazine, Super Street Bike, and 2 Wheel Tuner. In music videos, Dominique has been videos for Snoop Dogg, Robin Thicke, Baby Bash, Ginuwine, Ray-J, 50 Cent, NeYo, and The-Dream. In 2012, she appeared as a replacement on Bad Girl's Club Season 9. She came to the show on episode 5 to replace Erika Jordan and left the show on episode due to getting jumped by four girls on the show: Ashley Dye, Falen Ghirmai, Julie Ofcharsky, and Rima Mellal. During her stay, she became a fan-favorite.

As a singer and songwriter, Dominique released her first album 'Toy-Box' with Safaree in 2021. In 2025, she released the song 'Catch My Wave' and in 2026, she released the album 'Romantic Tragedies' with the single 'Lue Viton'.

== Personal life ==
Dominique currently resides back in San Diego. she has a daughter who is on the autism spectrum.
