= Baddies season 5 =

2024 American reality television season

Baddies
- Season 5
- Starring: Natalie Nunn; Jelaminah "Jela" Lanier; Gia “Rollie" Mayham; Scotlynd “Scotty” Ryan; Damerlin "Biggie" Baez; Latifa "Tesehki" Malone; Mariahlynn Araujo; Anyssa "Ahna Mac" Santiago; Kendra "Sapphire Blaze" Lewis; Destiny "Sukihana" Henderson; Misharron "Asian Doll" Allen; Bianca "Bianca Bonnie" Dupree; Johnece "Kaliwae" Miller; Dayjia "Meatball" Blackwell; Sydonie "Diamond the Body" Person; Tatyana "Tinkaabellaaa" Williams; Tyrrion "Slim2Bad" Turner; Fredia "It's Dia" Major; Gretchen "Big Gretch" Cotto; Keva "Bigg Keva" Donaldson; Shameika "Nunu" Brailsford; Wendy "Wendollie" Cabrera; Heaven "Heaven Marina" De Leon; Lajerrika "J.O." Welch; JeLisa "Jelly Bean" Morris
- No. of episodes: 23

Release
- Original network: Zeus Network
- Original release: May 5 – October 20, 2024

Season chronology
- ← Previous; Season 4 Next → Season 6

The fifth season of Baddies, officially titled Baddies Caribbean, premiered on the Zeus Network on May 5, 2024 and is filmed throughout the Caribbean subregion of the Americas. The season was announced with a teaser video on December 31, 2023, and casting auditions were held in Miami, Florida shortly thereafter. The three-part audition special aired between March 3 and March 17, 2024.

== Cast ==
List of Baddies Caribbean main cast members
Name	Age (Note: Age at time of filming)	First appearance	Hometown
Natalie Nunn	39	Bad Girls Club 4: Los Angeles	Oakland, California
Jelaminah "Jela" Lanier	34	Bad Girls Club 14: Back for More	Houston, Texas
Gia "Rollie" Mayham	31	Jerry Springer	North Las Vegas, Nevada
Scotlynd "Scotty" Ryan	27	Baddies South	Charlotte, North Carolina
Damerlin "Biggie" Baez	27	Baddies West	Providence, Rhode Island
Mariahlynn Araujo	33	Love & Hip Hop: New York 6	Newark, New Jersey
Kendra "Sapphire" Lewis	33	Love & Hip Hop: Miami	Miami, Florida
Destiny "Sukihana" Henderson	32	Love & Hip Hop: Miami 3	Wilmington, Delaware
Latifa "Tesehki" Malone	29	Blueface & Chrisean: Crazy in Love	Jessup, Maryland
Anyssa "Ahna Mac" Santiago	23	Baddies East	Plainfield, New Jersey
Bianca "Bianca Bonnie" Dupree	32	Love & Hip Hop: New York 6	Harlem, New York
Johnece "Kaliwae" Miller	29	Blueface & Chrisean: Crazy in Love	Los Angeles, California
Sydonie "Diamond the Body" Person	32	DejaVu Miami	Miami, Florida
Dayjia "Meatball" Blackwell	22	Baddies Caribbean	Philadelphia, Pennsylvania
Misharron "Asian Doll" Allen	27	Baddies Caribbean	Dallas, Texas
Tyrrion "Slim2Bad" Turner	27	Baddies Caribbean Auditions	Baton Rouge, Louisiana
Gretchen "Big Gretch" Cotto	34	Baddies Caribbean Auditions	Tampa, Florida
Fredia "It's Dia" Major	30	Baddies Caribbean Auditions	Nassau, Bahamas
Tatyana "Tinkaabellaaa" Williams	25	Baddies Caribbean Auditions	Philadelphia, Pennsylvania

List of Baddies Caribbean replacement and recurring cast members
Replacement cast	Age	First appearance	Hometown	Replaced
Keva "Bigg Keva" Donaldson	31	Baddies Caribbean Auditions	Chicago, Illinois	Sukihana
Shameika "Nunu" Brailsford	29	Baddies Caribbean Auditions	Miami, Florida	Its Dia
JeLisa "Jelly Bean" Morris	21	Baddies Caribbean Auditions	Chicago, Illinois	Slim2bad
Lajerrika "J.O." Welch	34	Baddies Caribbean Auditions	Cleveland, Ohio	N/A
Wendy "Wendollie" Cabrera	34	Baddies Caribbean Auditions	Bronx, New York	N/A
Heaven "Heaven Marina" De Leon	25	Baddies West Auditions	San Jose, California	N/A
Supporting cast	Age	First appearance	Hometown	
Aubrey O'Day	40	Making the Band 3	San Francisco, California	
Shannade Clermont	30	Bad Girls Club 14: Back for More	New York City, New York	
Shannon Clermont	30	Bad Girls Club 14: Back for More	New York City, New York	
Atasha "Tommie Lee" Jefferson	39	Love & Hip Hop: Atlanta 5	Newark, New Jersey	
Etheria "Scarface" Ruffin	25	South Central Baddies 1	Los Angeles, California	

=== Cast duration ===
Cast member	Episodes																				Reunion		
Cast member	1	2	3	4	5	6	7	8	9	10	11	12	13	14	15	16	17	18	19	20	21	22	23
Natalie	Featured	Featured	Featured	Featured	Featured	Featured	Featured	Featured	Featured	Featured	Featured	Featured	Featured	Featured	Featured	Featured	Featured	Featured	Featured	Featured	Featured	Featured	Featured
Jelaminah	Featured	Featured	Featured	Featured	Featured	Featured	Featured	Featured	Featured	Featured	Featured	Featured	Featured	Featured	Featured	Featured	Featured	Featured	Featured	Featured	Featured	Featured	Featured
Scotty	Featured	Featured	Featured	Featured	Featured	Featured	Featured	Featured	Featured	Featured	Featured	Featured	Featured	Featured	Featured	Featured	Featured	Featured	Featured	Featured	Featured	Featured	Featured
Tesehki	Featured	Featured	Featured	Featured	Featured	Featured	Featured	Featured	Featured	Featured	Featured	Featured	Featured	Featured	Featured	Featured	Featured	Featured	Featured	Featured	Featured	Featured	Featured
Meatball	Featured	Featured	Featured	Featured	Featured	Featured	Featured	Featured	Featured	Featured	Featured	Featured	Featured	Featured	Featured	Featured	Featured	Featured	Featured	Featured	Featured	Featured	Featured
Sapphire	Featured	Featured	Featured	Featured	Featured	Featured	Featured	Featured	Featured	Featured	Featured	Featured	Featured	Featured	Featured	Featured	Featured	Featured	Featured	Featured	Featured	Featured	Featured
Mariahlynn	Featured	Featured	Featured	Featured	Featured	Featured	Featured	Featured	Featured	Featured	Featured	Featured	Featured	Featured	Featured	Featured	Featured	Featured	Featured	Featured	Featured	Featured	Featured
Biggie	Featured	Featured	Absent	Featured	Featured	Featured	Featured	Featured	Featured	Featured	Featured	Featured	Featured	Featured	Featured	Featured	Featured	Featured	Featured	Featured	Featured	Featured	Featured
Kaliwae	Featured	Featured	Absent	Featured	Featured	Featured	Featured	Featured	Featured	Featured	Featured	Featured	Featured	Featured	Featured	Featured	Featured	Featured	Featured	Featured	Featured	Featured	Featured
Tinkaabellaaa	Featured	Absent	Featured	Featured	Featured	Featured	Featured	Featured	Featured	Featured	Featured	Featured	Featured	Featured	Featured	Featured	Featured	Featured	Featured	Featured	Featured	Featured	Featured
Diamond	Featured	Absent	Featured	Featured	Featured	Featured	Featured	Featured	Featured	Featured	Featured	Featured	Featured	Featured	Featured	Featured	Featured	Featured	Featured	Featured	Featured	Featured	Featured
Ahna Mac	Featured	Absent	Absent	Absent	Absent	Absent	Absent	Absent	Featured	Featured	Featured	Featured	Featured	Featured	Featured	Featured	Featured	Featured	Featured	Featured	Featured	Featured	Featured
Rollie	Featured	Absent	Absent	Absent	Absent	Absent	Absent	Absent	Absent	Featured	Featured	Featured	Featured	Featured	Featured	Featured	Featured	Featured	Featured	Featured	Featured	Featured	Featured
Bigg Keva				Entered (Note: Bigg Keva, Jelly Bean, Nunu, J.O., Heaven and Wendollie enters the show as reserves.)	Featured	Picked (Note: Bigg Keva, Jelly Bean, Nunu and J.O were chosen as replacements.)	Absent	Absent	Absent	Absent	Absent	Absent	Absent	Featured	Featured	Featured	Featured	Featured	Featured	Featured	Featured	Featured	Featured
Nunu				Entered	Featured	Picked	Absent	Absent	Absent	Absent	Absent	Absent	Absent	Featured	Featured	Featured	Featured	Featured	Featured	Featured	Featured	Featured	Featured
Asian Doll							Entered (Note: Asian Doll joins the show.)	Featured	Featured	Featured	Absent	Absent	Absent	Featured	Featured	Featured	Featured	Featured	Featured	Featured	Featured	Featured	Featured
Bianca	Featured	Featured	Featured	Featured	Featured	Featured	Featured	Featured	Featured	Absent	Absent	Absent	Absent	Absent	Featured	Absent	Absent	Featured	Left (Note: Bianca Bonnie quit from Dominican Republic after physical altercations with Sapphire and Mariahlynn.)		Featured	Featured	
Jelly Bean				Entered	Featured	Picked	Absent	Absent	Absent	Absent	Absent	Absent	Absent	Featured	Featured	Featured	Left (Note: Jelly Bean quit from Dominican Republic to take care of her mental health due to multiple altercations with Kaliwae.)						
Gretchen	Featured	Absent	Featured	Featured	Featured	Featured	Featured	Featured	Featured	Featured	Featured	Featured	Featured	Featured	Featured	Featured	Left (Note: Gretchen quit from Dominican Republic due to an elbow injury.)				Featured	Featured	Featured
J.O.				Entered	Featured	Picked	Absent	Absent	Absent	Absent	Absent	Absent	Absent	Left (Note: J.O quit from Dominican Republic due to a family emergency.)							Featured	Featured	Featured
Slim	Featured	Featured	Featured	Featured	Featured	Featured	Featured	Featured	Featured	Featured	Evicted (Note: Dia and Slim were evicted from the Puerto Rico house after being voted by the majority of the girls.)										Featured	Featured	Featured
Dia	Featured	Absent	Featured	Featured	Featured	Featured	Absent	Featured	Featured	Featured	Evicted										Featured		Featured
Sukihana	Left (Note: Sukihana quits after the yacht ride in Miami.)																						
Supporting cast members
Aubrey	Featured	Featured	Featured	Featured	Featured	Left (Note: Aubrey left from Barbados after the nature hike.)																	
Tommie Lee				Featured	Featured	Left (Note: Tommie Lee left from Barbados after dinner for being over the experience.)															Featured	Featured	Featured
Heaven				Entered	Featured	Removed (Note: Heaven & Wendollie were not chosen and therefore were sent home.)															Featured	Featured	Featured
Wendollie				Entered	Featured	Removed															Featured	Featured	Featured
Shannade		Featured	Featured	Left (Note: Shannon and Shannade left from Barbados after feeling mistreated on their birthday.)																			
Shannon		Featured	Featured	Left																			
Scarface															Appeared (Note: Scarface appears for the Zeus CEO's Birthday Party and to talk with Rollie.)	Appeared					Featured		Featured

=== Reunion ===
The final episode was followed by a reunion special, hosted by Janeisha John, Bobby Lytes and Saucy Santana, which was released on October 6, 2024. Jelly Bean, Sukihana, Aubrey O'Day and the Clermont twins were not present at the reunion taping. Tommie Lee and Scarface appeared at the reunion. Bigg Keva, Tommie Lee, Bianca Bonnie, Meatball, Tinkaabellaaa, Biggie and Diamond The Body all left the reunion during filming.

Baddies S5 Reunion Seating Arrangement
Viewer's Left					HOSTS		Viewer's Right			
Wendollie	J.O.	Mariahlynn	~~Bigg Keva~~	Rollie	Saucy Santana	Janeisha John	It's Dia	~~Bianca~~	Big Gretch	~~Meatball~~
NuNu	Slim2Bad	Sapphire	Jelaminah		Saucy Santana	Janeisha John	Tesehki	Kaliwae	~~Tommie~~	~~Diamond~~
Asian Doll	Scotty	Heaven	Natalie		Saucy Santana	Janeisha John	~~Scarface~~	~~Tinkaabellaaa~~	Ahna Mac	~~Biggie~~

== After Filming ==
- Natalie, Scotlynd, and Rollie appeared on Aunt Tea Podcast.
- Natalie, Scotlynd, Rollie, Biggie, Mariahlynn, Ahna Mac, Tesehki, Sapphire, Jela, Meatball, Asian Doll and Tinkaabellaaa were judges for the Baddies Midwest & Gone Wild Auditions.
- Natalie, Scotlynd, Rollie, Biggie, Ahna Mac, Tesehki, Jela, Diamond The Body, Tinkaabellaaa and Nunu returned for the sixth season of Baddies Midwest with Tommie making an appearance.
- Natalie, Scotlynd, Rollie, Jela, Biggie, Ahna Mac, Diamond The Body, Tinkaabellaaa and Sapphire were judges for the Baddies Africa Auditions.
- Natalie, Scotlynd, Rollie, Ahna Mac, and Diamond The Body returned for the seventh season of Baddies Africa while Biggie is on timeout and Tommie making an appearance.
- Tesehki and Rollie appeared as guests on The Jason Lee Show.
- Natalie, Scotlynd, Rollie, Jela, Ahna Mac, Diamond The Body, Biggie, Tesehki, Big Gretch, Tinkaabellaaa, Sukihana, Sapphire, Mariahlynn, Nunu and Tommie returned for the eighth season of Baddies USA.
- Natalie, Rollie, Diamond The Body, Biggie, Scarface, Tesekhi, Tinkaabellaaa, Mariahlynn and Tommie returned for the ninth season of BaddIes USA Chapter Two.
- Natalie, Rollie, Biggie, Scarface, Tesekhi, Tinkaabellaaa, Kaliwae, Sukihana, Sapphire and Tommie returned for the iconic tenth season of Baddies USA Chapter Three.

== Episodes ==
Baddies season 5 episodes
No. overall	No. in season	Title	Original release date
-	SP101	"Auditions: Part 1"	March 3, 2024
Scores of ladies arrive in Miami from all over to prove why they should be the next Baddie.
-	SP102	"Auditions: Part 2"	March 10, 2024
Things heat up in the pre-screening, before getting even hotter on the main stage.
-	SP103	"Auditions: Part 3"	March 17, 2024
The mainstage goes crazy when one of the contestants challenges Natalie.
69	1	"We Outside Tonight"	May 5, 2024
Before heading to the Caribbean, the Baddies link up in Miami where the tone is immediately set.
70	2	"Flew'd Out"	May 12, 2024
The Baddies make their way to Barbados after a chaotic welcome dinner.
71	3	"Don't Get To Comfortable"	May 19, 2024
After arriving in Barbados, the Baddies turn the house into a Battle Royale.
72	4	"Let's Get Ready To Rumblllllle"	May 26, 2024
The Newbies and Replacements square up in all out battle on the beach in Barbados.
73	5	"Drowned You"	June 2, 2024
Natalie and Tommie rumble in the ocean.
74	6	"Last Night in Barbados"	June 9, 2024
For their last night in Barbados, the Baddies head to the mountain top to clear the air and each other.
75	7	"Welcome To Puerto Rico"	June 16, 2024
The Baddies leave Barbados behind, but make sure to bring the drama with them.
76	8	"We Outside...Fighting"	June 23, 2024
The Baddies ride ATV's through Puerto Rico.
77	9	"Unfriended"	June 30, 2024
As Mariahlynn and Asian Doll continue their beef, Bianca's involvement comes into focus.
78	10	"Eviction Notice"	July 7, 2024
It's the last night in Puerto Rico, but some of the ladies won't make it to the D.R.
79	11	"What You Say About My Momma?"	July 14, 2024
Before leaving for the DR, Ahna gets into a fight with Mariahlynn's mom and aunt.
80	12	"Frenemies And Allies"	July 21, 2024
Kali and Gretchen's bond strengthens after taking on half of the house.
81	13	"Mama Said Knock You Out!"	July 28, 2024
A showdown pops off between Mariahlynn and Ahna, over Ahna fighting Mariah's mom.
82	14	"Fly Like An Eagle"	August 4, 2024
The Baddies zipline through a Dominican forest before getting back to the drama.
83	15	"Happy Birthday Lemmie!"	August 11, 2024
The Baddies turn up at the Zeus CEO's birthday party.
84	16	"Time to Eat or EAT!"	August 18, 2024
The Baddies are going to dinner, but Natalie and Rollie have some unfinished business to settle with ET beforehand.
85	17	"Welcome Home?"	August 25, 2024
The replacements move into the house but aren't met with a warm welcome.
86	18	"Guess Who's Back"	September 1, 2024
Bianca returns and both Sapphire & Mariahlynn have a score to settle with her.
87	19	"It's a Family Reunion"	September 8, 2024
Biggie stops to see her family in Santo Domingo on the last days of the baddies Caribbean tour.
88	20	"Any Last Words?"	September 15, 2024
The ladies spend their final night together at a dinner fit for the baddies.
89 (Note: The three-part Baddies Midwest and Baddies Gone Wild auditions special aired before the Baddies Caribbean reunion.)	21	"Reunion Part 1"	October 6, 2024
The ladies reunite in Los Angeles to settle things once and for all.
90	22	"Reunion Part 2"	October 13, 2024
Gretchen and Jela get their lick back. Ahna and Nunu finally get their fair fight.
91	23	"Reunion Part 3"	October 20, 2024
Heaven and Dia finally get their fair fight after Dia shaded Heaven in a song. Rollie and Tommie unexpectedly get into a fight.
