= 50 Cent: The Money and the Power =

- Created by: 50 Cent
- Developed by: Michael Hirschorn; Michael Bloom; Madison Merritt
- Directed by: Peter Ney
- Starring: 50 Cent
- Theme music composer: 50 Cent
- Composer: Ky Miller
- Country of origin: United States
- Original language: English
- No. of seasons: 1
- No. of episodes: 10

Production
- Executive producers: 50 Cent; Michael Hirschorn; Stella Bulochnikov Stolper; Chris Choun; Michael Bloom; David Pritikin
- Cinematography: Keith Duggan
- Running time: 45–48 minutes
- Production companies: Ish Entertainment; MTV

Original release
- Network: MTV
- Release: November 6, 2008 – January 22, 2009

50 Cent: The Money and the Power is an American reality television series which premiered November 6, 2008, on MTV. The show was hosted by 50 Cent and follows the same mold as The Apprentice. It was meant to serve as a "visual companion" to 50 Cent's book The 50th Law, which he co-wrote with Robert Greene, author of The 48 Laws of Power. The show was cancelled after one season.

== Format ==
The show follows fourteen aspiring rap moguls through challenges issued by 50 Cent, with the winner receiving a $100,000 investment from 50 Cent to start his or her own business venture. A panel including G-Unit members Tony Yayo and Lloyd Banks will judge the contestants, along with guests such as Chris Lighty, Ryan Schinman, LL Cool J, DJ Whoo Kid, Miss Info, and former Danity Kane member Aubrey O'Day.

== Contestants ==
Contestant	Background	Original team	Age	Hometown	Result
Ryan Mayberry	Internet dreamer	Team Power	24	Lancaster, Pennsylvania	Winner (01–22–2009)
Larry Wade	Financial consultant	Team Money	26	Tampa, Florida	Runner-up (01–22–2009)
Maurice "Cornbreadd" Duhon Jr.	Aspiring music mogul	Team Money	26	Houston, Texas	3rd place (01–22–2009)
Mehgan James	Business major	Team Power	18	Houston, Texas	4th place (01–15–2009)
Derrick Hargrove	Civil servant	Team Power	18	Plant City, Florida	5th place (01–08–2009)
Nikki Shallwani	Advertising rep.	Team Money	26	Aurora, Illinois	6th place (01–01–2009)
Lawrence "Musso"	Bartender / entrepreneur	Team Power	23	Brooklyn, New York	7th place (01–01–2009)
Jennifer Hunt	Merchandising major	Team Money	18	San Diego, California	8th place (12–19–2008)
DaJuan Watkins	Independent promoter	Team Power	22	Gary, Indiana	9th place (12–12–2008)
Rebecca Clark	Yoga instructor	Team Power	21	Santa Monica, California	10th place (12–12–2008)
Precious Bogard	Small business owner	Team Money	20	Lancaster, California	11th place (12–04–2008)
Nima "Blue Eyes" Tabrizi	Advertising rep.	Team Money	21	Thousand Oaks, California	12th place (11–20–2008)
Nathan Strickland	Marketing director	Team Power	20	Calhoun, Georgia	13th place (11–13–2008)
Joanne Paguio	Retail manager	Team Money	25	Los Angeles, California	14th place (11–06–2008)

=== Weekly results ===
Contestant	Original team	Episode 4 team	Episode 5 team	Episode 7 team	Episode 8 team	Record as Boss
Ryan	Team Power	Team Power	Team Power	Team Power	Team Power	1–0 (win in task 1)
Larry	Team Money	Team Money	Team Money	Team Money	Team Money	1–1 (win in task 8, loss in task 6)
Cornbreadd	Team Money	Team Money	Team Money	Team Power	Team Money	1–0 (win in task 5)
Mehgan	Team Power	Team Power	Team Power	Team Power	Team Power	1–2 (win in task 7, loss in tasks 6 & 8)
Derrick	Team Power	Team Power	Team Money	Team Money	Team Power	1–0 (win in task 2)
Nikki	Team Money	Team Money	Team Money	Team Money		0–2 (loss in tasks 2 & 7)
Musso	Team Power	Team Power	Team Power			2–0 (win in tasks 3 & 4)
Jennifer	Team Money	Team Power	Team Power			0–1 (loss in task 5)
DaJuan	Team Power	Team Money				0–1 (loss in task 4)
Rebecca	Team Power	Team Money				
Precious	Team Money					0–1 (loss in task 3)
Nima	Team Money					
Nathan	Team Power					
Joanne	Team Money					0–1 (loss in task 1)

==== Bosses and underbosses ====
Bosses
Contestants	1	2	3	4	5	6	7	8	9-10
Team Money	Joanne	Nikki	Precious	DaJuan	Cornbreadd	Larry	Nikki	Larry	------
Team Power	Ryan	Derrick	Musso	Musso	Jennifer	Mehgan	Mehgan	Mehgan	------

Underbosses
Contestants	1	2	3	4	5	6	7-10
Team Money	------	Larry	Nikki	Larry	Nikki	Derrick	------
Team Power	------	Mehgan	DaJuan	Derrick	Ryan	Ryan	------

==== Contestant progress ====
50 Cent's assessments
Episodes
No.	Contestants	1	2	3	4	5	6	7	8	9	10	
1	Ryan	WIN	WIN	WIN	WIN	SAFE	SAFE	WIN	SAFE	SAFE	SAFE	WIN
2	Larry	RISK	RISK	RISK	RISK	WIN	SAFE	SAFE	WIN	SAFE	SAFE	OUT
3	Cornbreadd	SAFE	SAFE	RISK	RISK	WIN	SAFE	WIN	WIN	RISK	OUT	
4	Mehgan	WIN	WIN	WIN	WIN	SAFE	RISK	WIN	RISK	OUT		
5	Derrick	WIN	WIN	WIN	WIN	WIN	RISK	RISK	OUT			
6	Nikki	SAFE	RISK	SAFE	SAFE	WIN	RISK	OUT				
7	Musso	WIN	WIN	WIN	WIN	RISK	SAFE	OUT^{4}				
8	Jennifer	SAFE	SAFE	SAFE	WIN^{2}	OUT						
9	Dajuan	WIN	WIN	WIN	OUT^{2}							
10	Rebecca	WIN	WIN	WIN	QUIT^{2}^{3}							
11	Precious	RISK	SAFE	OUT								
12	Nima	SAFE	OUT									
13	Nathan	WIN	OUT^{1}									
14	Joanne	OUT										

The contestant won.
The contestant was eliminated.
The contestant was told that they were in risk, but ended up being safe from the chopping block.
The contestant was in risk of being eliminated, and was on the losing team.
The contestant was in risk of being eliminated, and was on the winning team.
The contestant won the challenge, and was not in risk or eliminated.
The contestant lost the challenge, but was not in risk or eliminated.
The contestant left the game towards other reasons rather than being put in the chopping block.
The contestant voluntarily left the competition.

^1In Episode 2, Nathan won the challenge, and was eliminated because 50 Cent said Nathan was in the game for the wrong reasons.

^2The Teams were changed in Episode 4 and Dajuan was named boss of Team Money, and Jennifer and Rebecca switched teams.

^3In Episode 4, Rebecca lost the challenge, and left the game because she felt she didn't need to be there.

^4In Episode 7, Musso was sent home for losing his temper.

== Episodes ==
No.	Title	Original release date
1	"Choose Your Crew Wisely"	November 6, 2008
2	"Turn S... Into Sugar"	November 13, 2008
3	"Truth Equals Money"	November 20, 2008
4	"Respect the Hustle"	December 4, 2008
5	"The Hustler's Eye"	December 12, 2008
6	"Use Your Cents to Make Change"	December 19, 2008
7	"Expand and Protect Your Turf"	January 1, 2009
8	"Move From Demand to Supply"	January 8, 2009
9	"Knowledge Reigns Supreme"	January 15, 2009
10	"Crush Your Competition"	January 22, 2009
