= Basketball Wives Orlando =

- Genre: Reality television
- Starring: Morgan Bledsoe; Nique Brown; Mulan Hernandez; Mackenzie Hyatt; Mehgan James; Danielle Miller; Ashley Snell
- Country of origin: United States
- Original language: English
- No. of seasons: 1
- No. of episodes: 12

Production
- Running time: 42–44 minutes

Original release
- Network: VH1
- Release: October 9, 2023 – January 8, 2024

Basketball Wives Orlando is an American reality television series broadcast on VH1 from October 9, 2023, until January 8, 2024. It is a spin-off of Basketball Wives, and chronicles the everyday lives of women romantically linked to men in the professional basketball industry that reside in Orlando, Florida.

== Production ==
On August 31, 2023, executive producer Shaunie Henderson announced that Basketball Wives: Orlando would make its series premiere on October 9, 2023.

The announced cast includes Ashley Snell, wife of Tony Snell, Lyndzie Marble, wife of Devyn Marble, Morgan Bledsoe, wife of Eric Bledsoe, Basketball Wives LA 's Mehgan James, Nique Brown, girlfriend of Dwayne Bacon, Mackenzie Hyatt, girlfriend of Rashad Vaughn and mother of Dwayne Bacon's children, Danielle Miller, ex-fiancée of Rashad Vaughn, Mulan Hernandez, ex-girlfriend of Bol Bol, and Black Ink Crew: Chicago's Nikki Nicole, ex-girlfriends of Josh Jackson and Phor Brumfield. The show was quietly cancelled in June 2024.

== Cast ==
=== Main ===
- Morgan Bledsoe
- Nique Brown
- Mulan Hernandez
- Mackenzie Hyatt
- Mehgan James
- Danielle Miller
- Ashley Snell

=== Recurring ===
- Lyndzie Marble
- Nikki Nicole

== Episodes ==
No.	Title	Original release date	U.S. viewers (millions)
1	"Welcome to Orlando"	October 9, 2023	0.31
2	"Grand Re-Opening, Grand Closing"	October 16, 2023	0.22
3	"Never Have I Ever"	October 23, 2023	0.28
4	"The Last Supper"	October 30, 2023	0.26
5	"You Been Around My Kids?"	November 6, 2023	0.22
6	"You've Been Served!"	November 13, 2023	0.22
7	"Riding to Hell in Gasoline Drawers"	November 20, 2023	0.15
8	"Phor-get Me Not"	November 27, 2023	0.15
9	"Friends Close, Enemies Closer"	December 4, 2023	0.15
10	"Health is Wealth"	December 11, 2023	0.17
11	"Delray Beach or Bust"	December 18, 2023	0.18
12	"A Summer to Remember"	January 8, 2024	0.20
