= Sarah Oliver =

American media personality

- Born: Sarah Lynn Oliver; March 4, 1985 (age 41); Fort Stewart, Georgia, USA
- Other name: Sarah SO Oliver
- Education: Perimeter College at Georgia State University
- Occupations: Reality television star, actress, model, video vixen, entrepreneur
- Years active: 2009–present
- Television: Bad Girls Club
- Partner: Ray J (2020)

Sarah Lynn Oliver, is an American reality television star, actress, model, video vixen and entrepreneur. She is best known for her appearances on Oxygen network's hit reality television series, Bad Girls Club.

== Modelling career ==
Oliver began modeling doing advertisements for companies such as Cuervo and TAG Body Spray, which were featured in Jezebel and Maxim magazines. She made appearances in Blackmen, KING, Playboy and Show magazines.

She later began appearing in music videos for artists such as 2 Chainz, DJ Drama, Jermaine Dupri, Keri Hilson and R. Kelly.

In 2009, she began acting, appearing in Van Wilder: Freshman Year, with her scene as "Hot Girl" being featured in Playboy magazine for "Best Erotic Scene in Cinemas". She has starred in other acting roles, featuring in the films Temptation: Confessions of a Marriage Counselor, Turnt, The Return and In This House. She starred in televisions shows Law and Order: Special Victims Unit and Star. She regularly appears in comedic skits for Kountry Wayne.

== Television career ==
In 2009, Oliver began making small television appearances including background roles in; Atlanta Fitness Beauties, Best of the Best, The Game and as a guest on The Trisha Goddard Show.

In 2012, she starred as a cast member in the pilot for a reality show titled; Mistresses of Atlanta.

In 2013, Oliver appeared on the eleventh season of the Oxygen network's hit reality television series Bad Girls Club. She was sent home in the fourth episode after a physical altercation with fellow cast member, Milyn Jensen. Oliver won the fan favorite vote with a total of 58% of the fan vote, with the other 42% being split between the other 12 cast members.

In 2014, she was a contestant on the second season of the Bad Girls Club spin-off Bad Girls All-Star Battle. She placed second overall, never facing elimination the entire competition. She co-hosted the Bad Girls Club: Funniest Bad Girls of All Time special, alongside Camilla Poindexter, Janelle Shanks, Judi Jai and Tanisha Thomas.

In 2015, she was a cast member for the thirteenth season of Bad Girls Club: Redemption, which featured all star bad girls from the previous twelve series. She was featured in the whole season and toured with Natalie Nunn after the show finished airing.

In 2015, Oliver was a cast member on We TV's reality television show, Marriage Boot Camp: Reality Stars season 4, alongside her fiancé Jimmy "Inkman" Coney.

In 2020, she appeared on Zeus Network's reality series; The Conversation. She was a cast member and producer on Baddies ATL and made guest appearances on Baddies South and Baddies USA. Her appearance on Baddies South, went viral from her greeting Natalie Nunn by saying "Oh, Ms. Nunn!". In promotion for Baddies USA, Oliver alongside former Bad Girls Club star Judi Jai, hosted TMZ's official brunch bus in Los Angeles.

== Personal life ==
She briefly dated R&B singer, Ray J. She is 1/3 (29%) Japanese.

== Filmography ==
Film and television
Year	Title	Role	Notes
2000	Ricki Lake	Self; guest	1 episode
2009	Van Wilder: Freshman Year	Hot girl	
2009	The Game	Extra	1 episode
2010	Best of the Best	Self; model	1 episode
2010	Atlanta Fitness Beauties	Self; model	1 episode
2011	The Trisha Goddard Show	Self; guest	1 episode
2012	Mistresses of Atlanta	Self; cast member	Pilot
2013	Temptation: Confessions of a Marriage Counselor	Club friend	Uncredited
2013	Bad Girls Club Season 11: Miami	Self; cast member	7 episodes
2013	The Soup	Self; guest	1 episode
2014	Bad Girls All-Star Battle Season 2	Self; contestant	2nd place, 12 episodes
2014	AfterBuzz TV: Bad Girls All Star Battle Season 2	Self; guest	1 episode
2014	Bad Girls Club: Funniest Bad Girls of All Time	Self; co-host	TV special
2014	Bad Girls Club Season 13: Redemption	Self; cast member	12 episodes
2015	Marriage Boot Camp: Reality Stars Season 4	Self; cast member	10 episodes
2016	FOX 5 Atlanta	Self; feature	1 episode
2017	Star	Monique	1 episode
2018	NBC 6	Self; feature	1 episode
2019	Couples Court	Self; witness	1 episode
2020	Turnt	Antoinette Lockett	
2020	Bad Bitch Reunion	Self; cast member	Pilot
2020	The Conversation	Self; feature	2 episodes
2021	For Real: The Story of Reality TV	Self; feature	1 episode
2021	Baddies ATL	Self; cast member	Producer, 10 episodes
2022	Baddies South	Self; guest	1 episode
2022	Law and Order: Special Victims Unit	Prisoner	1 episode
2023-present	Kountry Wayne Comedy Skit's	Various roles	Recurring role
2023	The Return	Madame	
2023	Cutler's Court	Self; witness	1 episode
2024	Playboy's Atlanta: Auditions Special	Self; host	1 episode
2024	In This House	D. Wight	
2025	Baddies USA	Self; guest	2 episodes

Music videos
Year	Title	Artist	Role
2007	5000 Ones	DJ Drama featuring. Diddy, Nelly, T.I., Twista, Willie the Kid, Young Jeezy and Yung Joc	Self; model
2009	Whooty	EDUBB	Self; model
2010	Hot and Fun	Jermaine Dupri	Self; model
2010	The Way You Love Me	Keri Hilson featuring. Rick Ross	Self; model
2011	Man Down	BoomMan featuring. Gucci Mane	Self; model
2011	Pacman	Pill featuring. Rick Ross	Self; model
2013	Like Me	2 Chainz featuring. The Weeknd	Self; model
2015	It's Your Birthday	R. Kelly	Self; model
2015	King Kong	Joe Green	Self; model
2017	D. Boy	K. Digga	Self; model

== Awards and accomplishments ==
Bad Girls Club Hall of Fame

- Most Enviable Body (2015)
