= Bad Girls Club season 16 =

Bad Girls Club
- Season 16
- The original seven "Bad" Girls of season 16 left to right: Brynesha, Kailie, Zee, Elliadria, Kaila, Adryan, and Tabatha.
- No. of episodes: 12

Release
- Original network: Oxygen
- Original release: September 20 – December 13, 2016

Season chronology
- ← Previous; Season 15 Next → Season 17

Bad Girls Club: Social Disruption is the sixteenth season of the Oxygen reality television series Bad Girls Club. On July 21, 2016, the full cast was announced with a premiere date of September 20, 2016. Before the season began, a casting special aired on September 13, 2016. This season features Bad Girls who are prominently known and have a following on social media.

== Cast ==
=== Original Bad Girls ===
| Name | Age (Note: Age at the time of filming) | Hometown | Social Media |
|---|---|---|---|
| Adryan "Ryan" Jones | 23 | Philadelphia, Pennsylvania | @ridiculouslyryan |
| Brynesha "Talone" Seegers | 22 | Washington, D.C. | @talonemusic |
| Elliadria "Sua" Griffin | 25 | Dallas, Texas | @iampersuasian |
| Kaila "Winter" Wilkey | 22 | Richmond, California | @wiintrr |
| Kailie Lima | 21 | Allenstown, New Hampshire | @kailiebijou |
| Stephanie "Zee" Carrino | 24 | San Jose, California | @lady.westcoast |
| Tabatha "DreamDoll" Robinson | 23 | Bronx, New York | @dreamdoll__ |

=== Replacement Bad Girls ===
| Name | Age (Note: Age at the time of filming) | Hometown | Social Media | Replaced |
|---|---|---|---|---|
| Stephanie Tejada | 27 | Orlando, Florida | @stephanietejadaa | Tabatha |
| Kandyce "Kandy" Hogan | 24 | Riverdale, Illinois | @Kruel_kandyy | Elliadria |
| Kabrina Nashayé | 23 | Chicago, Illinois | @BossyBrina | Kailie |
| Tiara Nicole | 26 | Memphis, Tennessee | @mytiaranicole | Kaila |

=== Duration of Cast ===
| Bad Girl | Episodes | | | | | | | | | |
| Bad Girl | 1 | 2 | 3 | 4 | 5 | 6 | 7 | 8 | 9 | 10 |
|---|---|---|---|---|---|---|---|---|---|---|
| Zee | Featured | | | | | | | | | |
| Brynesha | Featured | | | | | | | | | Left (Note: Brynesha voluntarily leaves the house after a physical altercation with Kandyce.) |
| Adryan | Featured | | | | | | | removed (Note: Adryan is removed from the house after a heated argument with the producers.) | | |
| Kaila | Featured | | | | | | Left (Note: Kaila voluntarily leaves the house after multiple heated arguments with Kandyce.) | | | |
| Elliadria | Featured | | | | removed (Note: Elliadria was removed from the house after physically harming Kaila's finger during a physical altercation.) | | | | | |
| Kailie | Featured | | | | Left (Note: Kailie voluntarily left the house after a heated argument with Brynesha, Adryan and Kaila.) | | | | | |
| Tabatha | Featured | removed (Note: Tabatha was removed from the house after bullying, and physically harming Kailie.) | | | | | | | | |
| Stephanie | | | Entered (Note: Stephanie replaced Tabatha.) | Featured | | | | | | |
| Kandyce | | | | | | Entered (Note: Kandyce replaced Elliadria.) | Featured | | | |
| Kabrina | | | | | | | Entered (Note: Kabrina and Tiara replace Kailie and Kaila respectively.) | Featured | | |
| Tiara | | | | | | | Entered | Featured | | |

== Episodes ==
| No. overall | No. in season | Title | Original release date | Viewers (millions) |
|---|---|---|---|---|
| 250 | 0 | "Casting Special" | September 13, 2016 | 0.221 |
The cast of Season 16 was revealed and previews of the season were shown.
| 251 | 1 | "#LikeItOrNah" | September 20, 2016 | 0.524 |
Six of the seven roommates arrived at the house the first day and Kaila, the last roommate, arrives at the house the second day, which irritates some of the girls. The girls put Kaila's bed downstairs as a test for her not arriving on the first day and to see how she will respond. Tabatha and Kaila displayed their wrath towards Kailie and Brynesha for not fitting in with their gang for having the lowest social media following in the house. After a night out, Kaila and Tabatha decide it is time to kick Kailie out the house by throwing her outside and deciding to pack her belongings. A frustrated Kailie fights back to stay in the house, leading to multiple physical altercations between her and Kaila.
| 252 | 2 | "#shabully" | September 27, 2016 | 0.551 |
Kailie comes back to the house with a bruised ankle after getting thrown to the ground by Tabatha and Kaila the previous episode. Brynesha calls Zee fake, leading to Zee throwing water on Brynesha, sparking a physical altercation between Brynesha and Zee. The girls leave Zee and Kailie behind at the house to go to the club, to the annoyance of Zee. Kailie seems happy that she'll be able to get some peace with the louder girls away. When the rest of the girls return from the club, Brynesha decides to fight with Zee again. At the same time, Tabatha and Kaila take their aim on Kailie. Tabatha and Kaila pull Kailie out of bed and to the ground, and throw water and milk on her while trying to physically move her. Kailie eventually leaves the room and makes her way to the production telephone. As she is walking, Kaila pushes Kailie. While she continues to walk away, Tabatha runs up to her and kicks her to the ground from behind. Following her actions, Tabatha is removed from the house, as she is deemed to be too violent and too incessant with her actions against Kailie. Note: Tabatha is removed from the house.
| 253 | 3 | "#FriendorFoe" | October 4, 2016 | 0.481 |
The girls decide to have a cleansing to get all the bad energy out of the house. They also go to a twerking class and a improv class, where they meet their new roommate Stephanie. After Elliadria becomes angry at Kaila for never hanging out with them at the club, they almost fight in the limo, leading the "Gang Gang Gang" to shatter. Note: Stephanie replaces Tabatha.
| 254 | 4 | "GANG GANG #GONE" | October 11, 2016 | 0.601 |
Half of the "Gang Gang Gang" wants to get rid of Zee. Brynesha gets a chance to work with a LA producer. Kaila and Elliadria have an argument in the limo. When they get to the house, Elliadria sticks up for Kailie after getting tired of the way Kaila has been treating her, ending up in a huge physical altercation between Elliadria and Kaila. During the fight, Kaila puts her finger in Elliadria's mouth, leading her to bite down and badly damage Kaila's finger. Elliadria is sent to a hotel and Kaila is sent to the hospital.
| 255 | 5 | "#GERMWARFARE" | October 25, 2016 | 0.514 |
Stephanie, Zee and Kailie start all hanging out with each other. Elliadria comes back to the house and tells the other girls that she has to go home, leading to an emotional goodbye between her and the other girls. Kaila comes back and finds out Elliadria was sent home. After Elliadria is gone, Kaila, Adryan and Brynesha make it their mission to get Kailie out once and for all. After being tired of being bullied by the other girls, Kailie leaves the house. Adryan gets a chance to work on her career. Brynesha and Zee have another physical altercation. Notes: Elliadria is removed from the house. Kailie voluntarily leaves the house.
| 256 | 6 | "Welcome To #KANDYLAND" | November 1, 2016 | 0.498 |
Zee finds a fun survival camp for all the girls to do, with a twist that they'll be spending the night in the woods. New Girl, Kandyce surprises the girls at the camp site and tries to understand everything going on in the house, but gets bad vibes from Kaila. Kaila's birthday weekend comes up, which causes tension between her & Kandyce. Kandyce starts to notice Kaila's true colors when she gets informed by Zee and Stephanie about some of the events that happened with Kailie from the first few weeks in the house. Kandyce decides to confront Kaila face to face & expresses her true feelings and how she feels about her, which leads to a heated argument. Security quickly steps in when Kandyce gets ready to fight Kaila. Note: Kandyce replaces Elliadria.
| 257 | 7 | "#helloGOODBYE" | November 8, 2016 | 0.628 |
Kaila decides to leave the house after multiple heated altercations with Kandyce. The girls' best friends come to the house. They then go on a yacht. Adryan spends her day on the yacht sleeping. While the girls are heading back to the house, new girls Kabrina and Tiara enter the house. Notes: Kaila voluntarily leaves the house. Kabrina and Tiara replace Kailie and Kaila.
| 258 | 8 | "#shadesofgay" | November 15, 2016 | 0.482 |
The girls find their new roommates at home. Kandyce reveals that her and new girl Kabrina know each other from back home. Adryan is confronted by the producers about her recent actions in the house and they ask her to pack up her things and leave, but she won't leave without a bang. Kandyce and Brynesha hook up. Note: Adryan is removed from the house.
| 259 | 9 | "#LoveGoneBad" | November 22, 2016 | 0.579 |
Brynesha reveals that she is not looking for a relationship with Kandyce, which irritates Kandyce to the point of no regret. The girls have a sexy slumber party. Kabrina opens up to her roommates.
| 260 | 10 | "#SHABYE" | November 29, 2016 | 0.611 |
It's mother's day, so Brynesha decides to skype with her kids and her mom. After Brynesha's mom brings up Kandyce, Kandyce comes to talk to her and it ends up in a huge altercation. The next day, Brynesha and Kandyce get into a physical altercation. After the fight, Kandyce talks badly about Brynesha's kids. Brynesha decides to leave the house after knowing that she couldn't get through the last days with Kandyce if they were in the house together, leading to a first in bad girls club history to only have 1 original remaining the last week. Stephanie hooks the girls up with a fun comedy roast. The girls leave the house. Note: Brynesha voluntarily leaves the house.
| 261 | 11 | "Reunion: Part 1" | December 6, 2016 | 0.709 |
The girls return to LA for the reunion. Tanisha invites Erica Mena to help her as a Co-Host. Kandyce returns to stage and brings a gift for Brynesha's kids and apologizes for what she said about them. Kaila and Tabatha come out on stage and Kaila runs up to Kandyce, sparking an epic cliffhanger.
| 262 | 12 | "Reunion: Part 2" | December 13, 2016 | 0.804 |
The episode picks up with Kaila vs. Kandyce. Adryan and Tanisha have a huge altercation, leading to Adryan getting sent home. Kailie and Tabatha apologize and hug each other. After the reunion has ended, the girls started to walk off stage, but Kandyce decides to sneak attack Tabatha, leading to a huge altercation with Kaila, Elliadria and Kabrina jumping in. A small sneak peek of the next season is posted at the end of the episode.
