= Bad Girls Club season 10 =

Bad Girls Club
- Season 10
- The original seven bad girls, from left to right: Janae, Alicia, Paula, Stephanie, Valentina, Nicole and Shannon
- No. of episodes: 18 (including 4 special)

Release
- Original network: Oxygen
- Original release: January 15 – May 21, 2013

Season chronology
- ← Previous; Season 9 Next → Season 11

The tenth season of Bad Girls Club is titled Bad Girls Club: Atlanta and premiered on January 15, 2013 and was filmed in Atlanta, Georgia.

== Residence ==
The house was in North Druid Hills, which is a few miles northeast of downtown Atlanta. The house was originally built for Fred Milani and was built as a replica of the White House. The exterior of the house was remodeled and included a pink roof and a Bad Girls Club logo above the door. Art directors who designed and furnished the house, Jeffrey Eyser and Alexis Karpf, said "We wanted to keep it very vintage, but modern".

The walls were painted with brights colors. The backyard had a pool and the girls' pictures were tall standing cutouts and had long magnetic strips to stick to the cutouts. The in-house confessional had pink and purple stained glass windows in the background, giving it a church "confess your sins" illusion. The walls of the living room had colorful crown molding scattered about.

The kitchen had artificial grass flooring which bleeds into the hallway. The phone room was designed as a gazebo. The beauty room had a "Southern salon vibe" and had vintage chairs and a neon sign which read "BEAUTY ROOM". The house had a stripper pole.

== Cast ==
The season began with seven original bad girls. Two left voluntarily, and two were removed by production. Three replacement bad girls were introduced in their absences later in the season.

List of Bad Girls
Name	Age (Note: Age at time of filming)	Hometown	Nickname	Replaced
Alicia Samaan	24	Bolingbrook, Illinois	Ms. Chi-Fly	—N/a
Janae Bradford	23	Houston, Texas	The Houston Hellraiser	—N/a
Nicole "Nikki" Vargas	22	Fort Lee, New Jersey	The Jersey Joker	—N/a
Paula Hellens	26	Chicago, Illinois	Hell On Heels	—N/a
Shannon Sarich	26	Hillsboro, Oregon	Buff Barbie	—N/a
Stephanie George	21	Harlem, New York	The Harlem Heartbreaker	—N/a
Valentina Anyanwu	22	Hyattsville, Maryland	The Sexy Socialite	—N/a
Jenniffer "Jenn" Hardwick	21	San Bernardino, California	The Fun-Loving Firecracker	Janae
Raquel "Rocky" Santiago	21	Pine Grove, California	The Cali Contender	Nicole
Nancy Denise	22	Memphis, Tennessee	The Tennessee Toughy	Jenniffer

=== Duration of Cast ===
Bad Girl	Episodes													
Bad Girl	1	2	3	4	5	6	7	8	9	10	11	12	13	14
Paula	Featured													
Shannon	Featured													
Stephanie	Featured													
Valentina	Featured													
Alicia	Featured													removed (Note: Alicia was removed from the house by production after starting a physical altercation with Raquel.)
Nikki	Featured			Left (Note: Nicole left the house voluntarily after multiple physical altercations with Valentina.)										
Janae	Featured		Left (Note: Janae left the house voluntarily after a physical altercation with Alicia.)											
Jenniffer				Entered (Note: Jenniffer replaced Janae.)	Featured			removed (Note: Jenniffer was removed from the house by production after almost causing harm to Raquel during a physical altercation.)						
Rocky					Entered (Note: Raquel replaced Nicole.)	Featured								
Nancy									Entered (Note: Nancy replaced Jenniffer.)	Featured				

== Episodes ==
No. overall	No. in season	Title	Original release date	Viewers (millions)
155	0	"Making it to the Mansion, ATL"	January 8, 2013	0.596
A special on the cast of Season 10. With season 4 Bad Girl Natalie and Season 8 Bad Girl Camilla.
156	1	"Southern Discomfort"	January 15, 2013	1.62
A new set of Bad Girls arrive in the Atlanta to shake things up. A night out at the club turns bad when Janae starts to argue with Paula and Nikki which leads Valentina getting into a fight with Janae.
157	2	"Houston Ho Down"	January 22, 2013	1.35
Janae gets under everyone's skin when she fails to let go of her insecurities. A prank pulled by Shannon backfires.
158	3	"Molly-Whopped"	January 29, 2013	1.13
After watching the house bully Janae repeatedly, Nikki feels like she could be the new target. Meanwhile, Stephanie finds out her new ATL boo has been keeping a secret from her. Note: Janae voluntarily leaves the house.
159	4	"The Girl Who Cried Mommy"	February 5, 2013	1.15
Nikki struggles with the choices of going home or staying. New girl Jenniffer brings a breath of fresh air to the house. Meanwhile, Shannon is confused about her feelings for a past flame after his visit leaves her uneasy. Notes: Jenniffer replaces Janae. Nikki voluntarily leaves the house.
160	5	"There's Something About Jerry..."	February 12, 2013	1.18
New girl Rocky creates problems for herself after being an instigator, while Shannon's weird house guest leaves explosive disagreements among the girls. Note: Rocky replaces Nikki.
161	6	"Anger Mismanagement"	February 19, 2013	1.31
Rocky and Shannon's clique strengthens after observing the other girls' flip-flopping ways. Meanwhile, Jenn's boyfriend comes for a visit and tries to tone down her fierce attitude.
162	7	"Bottled Up and Beat Down"	February 26, 2013	1.41
Savannah is the place to go after the house becomes too stressful for the ladies. Elsewhere, Jenn's spicy attitude heats up after frustration starts to build.
163	8	"Gone with the Weave"	March 5, 2013	1.22
Celebrity hairstylist, Derek J preps the girls for a fierce photo shoot. Stephanie and Rocky model in a photo shoot. Meanwhile, Shannon won't back down after being further condemned by Paula. Note: Jenniffer is removed from the house.
164	9	"Between A Rocky and A Hard Place"	March 12, 2013	1.08
After Rocky gets targeted by Alicia and Valentina, Shannon fails to come to the rescue. Rocky then begins to question her friendship with Shannon. Meanwhile, Paula attempts to make things right with Shannon. Note: Nancy replaces Jenniffer.
165	10	"Don't Cry For Me, Valentina!"	March 19, 2013	1.12
A shocking truce takes place between Valentina and "ShanRock," which unsettles the whole house. Meanwhile, Alicia's best friend comes to visit and decides to get comfortable with new girl Nancy.
166	11	"Who's Laughing Now"	March 26, 2013	1.21
Reconciliation is in the air for Alicia and Valentina as they realize that Rocky should be the focus of their rage. Nancy's temper worsens from all of the backstabbing in the house. A phone call between Rocky and her friend leads to an epic showdown.
167	12	"Rocky Like a Hurricane"	April 9, 2013	1.31
After Alicia jumps into Rocky and Nancy's fiery fight, Rocky then targets Alicia to show her the true meaning of a Bad Girl jumping.
168	13	"Greece Up, Get Down"	April 16, 2013	1.16
The first annual Bad Girls Games takes place in Greece. Meanwhile, revenge is on Alicia's mind as she targets Rocky.
169	14	"Home Is Where the Hurt Is"	April 23, 2013	1.41
Alicia's plan comes to fruition as she ties up some loose ends resulting in an all-out explosive battle. Note: Alicia is removed from the house.
170	15	"Reunion: Part 1"	May 7, 2013	1.38
The ladies of Atlanta meet up in Los Angeles for one final blowout as Shannon seeks her revenge.
171	16	"Reunion: Part 2"	May 14, 2013	1.50
Shannon goes toe-to-toe with the other ladies in an all-out fist fight. Meanwhile, Nancy and Stephanie's sexy hook-up becomes the main topic of discussion.
172	17	"Reunion: Part 3"	May 21, 2013	1.99
Alicia is confronted by the other "Bad" Girls about her shocking exit. Elsewhere, a raging Nikki blows off steam by confronting an unexpected target, leading to a shocking showdown.
