= Jason Lee (host) =

Founder of Hollywood Unlocked (born 1977)

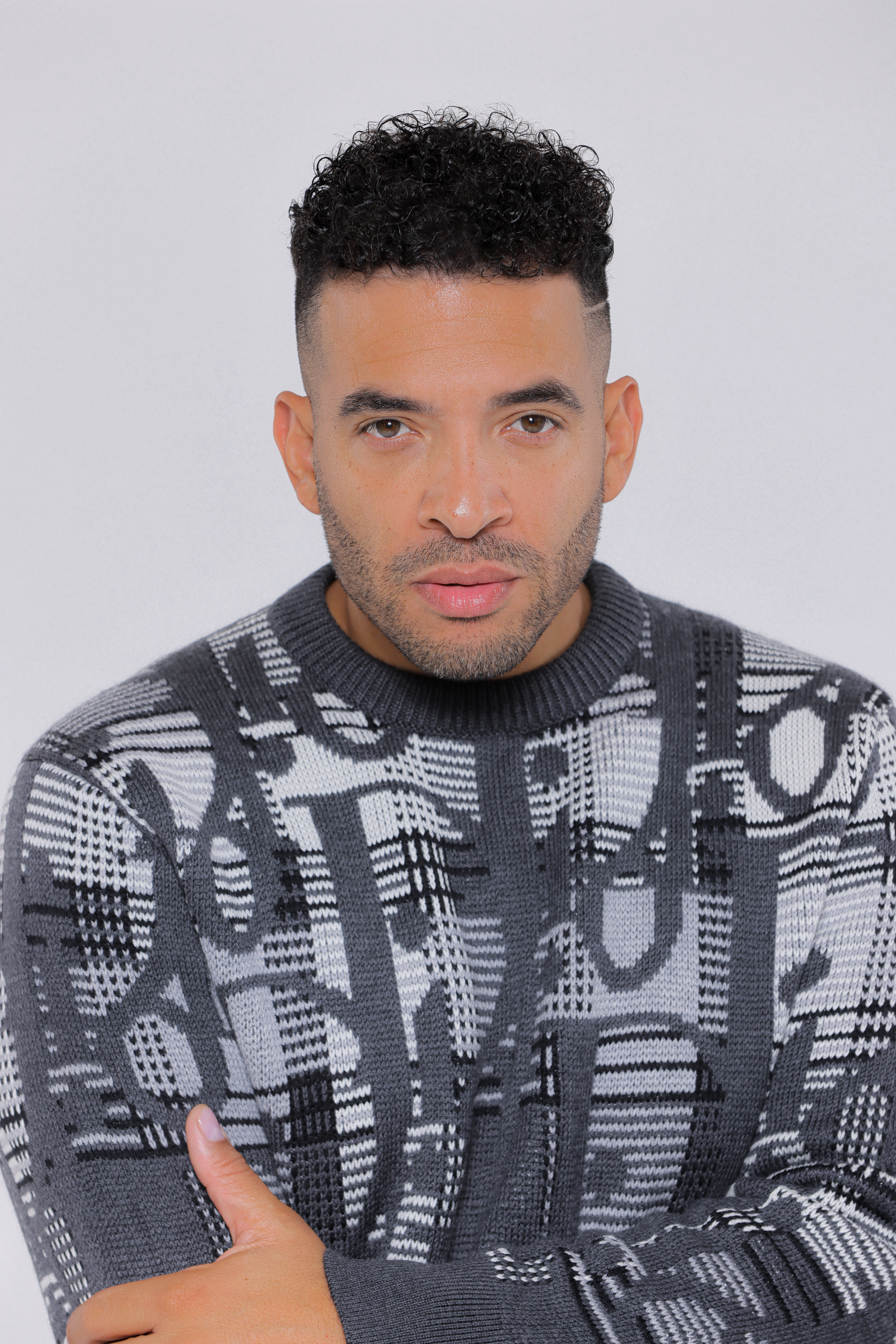
- Lee in 2021
- Born: Jason Lee Johnson; August 16, 1977 (age 49); Stockton, California, U.S.
- Occupations: Interviewer; Host; Politician
- Website: https://www.stocktonca.gov/government/city_council/district_6.php

Jason Lee Johnson (born August 16, 1977), known professionally as Jason Lee, is an American media entrepreneur, podcaster, and politician serving as vice mayor of Stockton, California, for District 6. He is the founder of Hollywood Unlocked, and former host of the podcast Hollywood Unlocked with Jason Lee and the television series The Jason Lee Show. He gained popularity for his recurring appearances in the reality series Love & Hip Hop: Hollywood. In November 2024, Lee was elected to the city council of Stockton, California, his hometown.

== Early life ==
Jason Lee Johnson was born on August 16, 1977, in Stockton, California. He was born to an African-American father and a White mother of Italian and Greek descent. His parents never married. His older brother was murdered in a drive-by shooting when Lee was fifteen years old. Lee moved to Los Angeles in 2006, where he was a labor union director until 2009.

== Career ==
=== Television ===
Lee has appeared on the reality television show Love & Hip Hop: Hollywood, first in the second season in 2015, and then again in seasons three and six. He later became a recurring cast member on the sketch television game show Wild 'N Out.

He also appeared on the Ricki Lake (1993 talk show).

In 2023, he released the eponymous Revolt TV television show The Jason Lee Show, where he also interviews public figures such as Cardi B and Laverne Cox. In February 2025 The Jason Lee Show began airing on The Zeus Network marking a transition from Revolt TV.

=== Hollywood Unlocked ===
In 2010, Lee founded an eponymous website that grew into the podcast Hollywood Unlocked with Jason Lee, which was founded in 2015. The blog and podcast earned a reputation for being a friendly environment to celebrity figures in the music and entertainment industries. On the podcast, Lee interviews public figures, and his past interviews have included public figures such as Cardi B, Amber Rose, Tiffany Haddish, Floyd Mayweather, and Kevin Hart.

Lee acts as the CEO of Hollywood Unlocked Inc. Lee is also known for his use of social media to critique contemporary American culture. In 2022, Lee raised controversy by claiming the death of Queen Elizabeth II had already occurred (it did not until later in the year).

=== Other ventures ===
Lee has also moderated live panels at conferences such as the Black Enterprise FWD Conference in 2019 and 2022 Revolt Summit x AT&T. He later signed a television production deal with Fox Soul in 2020.

In 2020, Lee launched the Hollywood Unlocked Impact Awards, an annual event to honor influencers, celebrities and icons who have made a lasting effect on Black culture. Previous Impact Award honorees include Chlöe Bailey, Law Roach, Whoopi Goldberg, Babyface, Tupac, Catherine Brewton, Floyd Mayweather, Kelis, Karen Bass and Lizzo.

From March to October 2022, Lee was the Head of Media and Partnerships for Ye, formerly known as Kanye West. Prior to that, Lee had served as a consultant on the release of Ye's album Donda 2.

== Political career ==
In November 2024, Lee was elected to the Stockton City Council representing District 6, defeating incumbent Kimberly Warmsley. He ran on the Safer Stockton Coalition slate alongside mayoral candidate Christina Fugazi and District 4 candidate Mario Enríquez. In January 2025, Fugazi appointed Lee as vice mayor, and the appointment was unanimously approved by the city council.

In August 2025, the city announced an investigation into whether Lee received payment for his involvement in bringing a May 2025 Wild 'N Out comedy show to Stockton that used $50,000 in city funds. Lee stated he volunteered without compensation and warned he may file a lawsuit, claiming the investigation was politically motivated. In October 2025, the city council considered a proposal for Hollywood Cares, a nonprofit Lee established in 2022, to use a city-owned property to support an application for state behavioral health funding. The city had turned down requests from four other nonprofits that applied for the same funding. Lee recused himself from the vote.

== Personal life ==
Lee is openly gay. He has stated that he prefers to keep his private life separate from his professional work and has emphasized wanting to be recognized for his business accomplishments rather than his sexuality.
