= Bad Girls Club season 17 =

Bad Girls Club
- Season 17
- The original seven "Bad" Girls of season 17 left to right: Francesca, Keyaira, Deshayla, Sayyora, Kiyanna, Susan, and Seven.
- No. of episodes: 12

Release
- Original network: Oxygen
- Original release: February 14 – May 2, 2017

Season chronology
- ← Previous; Season 16

Bad Girls Club: East Meets West is the seventeenth and final season of the Oxygen reality series Bad Girls Club. As in the title, the final season's cast contained women from either the East Coast or West Coast. It was the final Bad Girls Club series to air on Oxygen before its format change to a true crime network. In 2021, Baddies became the spiritual successor to the Bad Girls Club.

== Production ==
In October 2016, Executive Vice President of Original Programming and Development, Oxygen Media, Rod Aissa announced Bad Girls Club had been renewed for a seventeenth season, with production already in progress. The season consisted of Bad Girls from only the East Coast and the West Coast. On January 10, 2017, the cast was revealed, along with a premiere date of February 14, 2017. In April, Oxygen announced per their website that season 17 would be the final season of the franchise.

== Residence ==
The cast of the seventeenth season lived in a warehouse at 1931 Bay Street in the Arts District of Downtown Los Angeles. The official house tour was uploaded to YouTube on February 10, 2017, and was hosted by production designer Jeff Eyser and set decorator Sue Oneto. The open floor plan loft was boho chic inspired and featured a wall of bucket lists the girls could perform to win points for their respective coasts. The house had custom made furniture, including the phone room, a bar, an eight-foot hot tub, both bedrooms, and the upper level's beauty room.

== Cast ==
=== Original Bad Girls ===
The season began with seven original bad girls. Three were removed by production. One replacement bad girl was introduced in one of their absences later in the season.

Name	Age (Note: Age at time of filming)	Hometown	Nickname
Deshayla "Shay" Harris †	24	Norfolk, Virginia	The Firecracker Fashionista
Francesca "Fran" Jacovino	22	Torrington, Connecticut	The Rockin' Barbie
Keyaira "Key" Hamilton	26	Compton, California	The Raging Rapper
Kiyanna "Kiki" Bygrave	23	Brooklyn, New York	The Mouthy Matchmaker
Sayyora "Say" Badalbaeva	21	Northridge, California	The Exotic Enigma
Seven Craft	21	Fort Washington, Maryland	The Seventh Wonder of the Hood
Susan Shermann	21	Lynnwood, Washington	The Ticking Bombshell

=== Replacement Bad Girl ===
Name	Age	Hometown	Nickname	Replaced
Briana "Bri" Walker	23	Las Vegas, Nevada	The High-Rolling Hustler	Susan

=== Duration of cast ===
Bad Girl	Episodes									
Bad Girl	1	2	3	4	5	6	7	8	9	10
Deshayla	Featured									
Francesca	Featured									
Kiyanna	Featured									
Sayyora	Featured									
Briana					Entered (Note: Briana replaced Susan.)	Featured				
Keyaira	Featured									removed (Note: Keyaira was removed from the house after physically attacking Briana.)
Seven	Featured									removed (Note: Seven was removed from the house after physically attacking Kiyanna.)
Susan	Featured			removed (Note: Susan was removed from the house after threatening Francesca with a rat-tail comb.)						

== Episodes ==
No. overall	No. in season	Title	Original release date	Viewers (millions)
263	0	"Casting Special"	February 7, 2017	0.180
The cast of season 17 is revealed with 4 girls from the East Coast and 3 girls from the West Coast with sneak peeks shown.
264	1	"Coastal Clash"	February 14, 2017	0.323
The east and west coast girls meet and immediately form their factions. Susan's relationship status becomes a heated topic after Sayyora tells the other girls about a conversation she had with Susan and the girls initially turn against Susan. However, when Susan opens up more, the girls start to see Sayyora in a less-positive light for her sketchiness and being so quick to tell Susan's secrets. Keyaira in particular is not happy about Sayyora's behavior and the two almost come to blows. Kiyanna and Keyaira start to clique after Sayyora tries to run up on Keyaira while she's walking away, leading to Kiyanna to almost throw Sayyora to the ground.
265	2	"See Ya Later, INSTIgator"	February 21, 2017	0.412
Shifting alliances in the house see some girls making up, some girls breaking up, and others forming new friendships. A photo shoot becomes awkward when Keyaira is forced to shoot with enemies Susan and Sayyora. Kiyanna begins to instigate house drama and even draws the ire of ally Keyaira when she decides to be Sayyora's friend. In the midst of all the drama, Francesca tries to remain positive, but admits to having a hard time dealing with all the girls. Keyaira and Seven get closer to Susan when she opens up to them. Kiyanna decides to play a prank on Susan by messing with her bed, after constant arguing between the two. When Susan confronts her about it, it sparks a physical altercation between the two, leading to Susan to body slam Kiyanna on the floor. After they're broken up, Keyaira decides she's had enough with Sayyora and the two fight, ending with a cliffhanger.
266	3	"24 Hours in the BGC"	February 28, 2017	0.338
The episode picks up with Keyaira and Sayyora fighting, leading to Keyaira literally dragging Sayyora across the floor. Deshayla has issues with her boo back home, but after getting a girl's number at dinner, going to a burlesque show, and receiving advice from Keyaira, she decides to just try and have some fun. The rift between Kiyanna and Keyaira widens as cliques begin to form. Kiyanna, Sayyora and Francesca are on one side and Deshayla, Keyaira, Seven and Susan are on the other. Sayyora invites a boy over, which doesn't sit well with Keyaira. After constant arguing between the two, they eventually fight. Sayyora gets a big scratch between her eyes from Keyaira's jewelry. Keyaira is sent to a hotel. Seven decides to confront Kiyanna about her crying about all the fights, even though she has been the one instigating all of these fights. After the two almost fight, Seven is sent to a hotel. The episode ends with Keyaira and Seven's fates left up in the air.
267	4	"Squad Goals"	March 7, 2017	0.410
Keyaira and Seven return to the house. Keyaira looks to rapping as an escape from the drama. Deshayla and Francesca start to argue, leading to Deshayla to spit in Francesca's face, leading to a physical altercation between the two. After their fight, Francesca walks past Seven and puts her hand in her face, leading to an altercation. Kiyanna tries to jump Seven from the side, leading to another fight. Seven is sent to a hospital after suffering from a sore hand. Susan finds out her sister's best friend had just died. Contemplating whether she should go home or not, Seven and Keyaira tell her to stay, which she does. After an argument in the limo on the way home from a club, Susan is fed up with Francesca and Kiyanna after Francesca made a comment about Susan's husband. Susan starts going crazy, picking up a sharp rat tail comb, almost stabbing Francesca with it. Susan is sent home after threatening Francesca, leading to an emotional goodbye with her, Seven, Keyaira and Deshayla. Note: Susan is removed from the house.
268	5	"Blonde Sided"	March 14, 2017	0.411
Seven focuses more on her career as a DJ. Deshayla gets to meet with a fashion stylist. After a fun night of partying, Keyaira gets angry with Kiyanna in the limo, sparking an altercation between the two and bringing the altercation back to the house, where the two almost physically fight. The girls see their new replacement on the wall. New girl Briana comes into the house the next morning. Briana makes quick enemies with Seven, Keyaira and Deshayla. The episode ends with a mid-season trailer. Note: Briana replaces Susan.
269	6	"Strike Up a Match"	March 21, 2017	0.504
Kiyanna sets the girls up with a blind date. The girls go to a club, which Briana points out a guy she likes to the other girls. Sayyora then calls him over, but takes all the attention away from Briana. On the way back home, Briana pees in a bottle, which Kiyanna and Francesca find disgusting. Back at home, Briana physically attacks Francesca. After that fight, Kiyanna and Briana fight. After that fight, Kiyanna slaps Sayyora across the face, leading to this clique to be split in half.
270	7	"Balls to the Wall"	March 28, 2017	0.428
The episode picks up the morning after Francesca gets attacked by Briana, and she is still upset. All of the girls participate in a teambuilding exercise where they must work together to escape a locked room. The three west coast girls go out to dinner with Sayyora's new sugar daddy James. Keyaira gets angry when he leaves her to pay the tip on his $300 tab and goes off on Sayyora. James later buys Keyaira a bottle of tequila, which calms down the drama. Briana makes an emotional apology to Francesca for attacking her, which Francesca does not believe. Seven and Keyaira encourage Shay to come out of her shell more, but Shay goes over the top and Keyaira is not a fan. After the girls get back from bubble soccer, an argument starts between Keyaira, Briana, Francesca, and Kiyanna. The episode ends in a cliffhanger, when Keyaira fights Kiyanna and Francesca fights Briana.
271	8	"Swimming With Sharks"	April 4, 2017	0.389
The episode picks up with Keyaira and Kiyanna fighting in the confessional room. It then switches to Francesca and Briana fighting. Kiyanna is sent to a hotel after not being able to calm down after the fights. The next day, Francesca has a gig with the band she is a hype girl for. All the girls, minus Briana and Sayyora, go out to support her. The girls then have a day at a pool and do some synchronized swimming. Keyaira and Briana have an argument. The girls get a surprise that they are going to Las Vegas, where Keyaira will rap, and Seven will be DJing one night. This ends up in an argument over who will be driving.
272	9	"Sin City Showdown"	April 11, 2017	0.432
The episode picks up with the girls all going to Vegas. Things get heated when Keyaira decides to take the bedroom with 4 beds in it, even though their clique only has 3 people in it. Keyaira and Seven go on a radio show in the morning. Francesca, Briana, Kiyanna and Sayyora go zip-lining. Seven DJ's and Keyaira raps. After both of their performances, Keyaira's mom tells her that her uncle has died. Back at the hotel, Briana gets emotional after having to leave her friends, leading to an altercation between her and Keyaira, and a physical fight between the two. After Seven overhears Kiyanna congratulating Briana on "beating up Keyaira", Seven tries to go fight Kiyanna but gets blocked by security. Seven, Keyaira and Deshayla leave Vegas before the other girls. Back at the house, Seven and Keyaira make a plan to attack Kiyanna and Briana when they come into the house. In an explosive cliffhanger, Keyaira attacks Briana and Seven attacks Kiyanna.
273	10	"The Final Countdown"	April 18, 2017	0.501
The episode picks up with Keyaira attacking Briana and Seven attacking Kiyanna. Keyaira and Seven are both removed for the rest of the night into the next night. Sayyora pursues her plan to make her own hookah flavor. She makes a flavor and has a release party, to which she invites out all the girls, minus Keyaira and Seven. While the other girls are out, Keyaira and Seven return to the house and say that they have been removed from the house and are beyond happy they are leaving with each other, but are mad at Deshayla for going out with the other girls. The girls are beyond happy to see that Keyaira and Seven were removed. The girls try to rack up as much points on the bucket list wall. The east coast is revealed to have the most points and are rewarded with a VIP treatment. The girls say goodbye to LA. Note: Keyaira and Seven are both removed from the house.
274	11	"Reunion: Part 1"	April 25, 2017	0.634
The Bad Girls, minus Deshayla, who didn't want to come, return to Los Angeles to discuss what happened during their time in the house.
275	12	"Reunion: Part 2"	May 2, 2017	0.535
The two-part reunion continues.
