= Bad Girls Club season 11 =

Bad Girls Club
- Season 11
- The seven original bad girls, from left to right: Teresa, JazMone, Milyn, Tiana, Stephanie, Sarah, and Gina. Gina is pictured in Tess' absence despite being a replacement
- No. of episodes: 17

Release
- Original network: Oxygen
- Original release: August 13 – December 17, 2013

Season chronology
- ← Previous; Season 10 Next → Season 12

The eleventh season of the Oxygen reality television series Bad Girls Club is titled Bad Girls Club: Miami, also known as Bad Girls Club: Back in Miami and premiered on August 13, 2013. This is the second season to take place in Miami, the first being season 5, and was filmed in early 2013.

== Residence ==
The cast members lived in an 11,614 ft2 (1,078 m2) house located at 2700 North Bay Road in the Bayshore neighborhood of Miami Beach. The cast members' two-story brownstone mansion was originally constructed in 1925 but has since been expanded. The mansion included a led lit foyer which led to the cast photos along with the computer section, a do-it-yourself spray tanning booth, a confessional containing over 250 multi-colored glass bottles reflecting on light, a fish tank themed phone room, and three bedrooms. The official house tour was uploaded to YouTube on August 14, 2013, hosted once again by production designer Jeff Eyser.

== Cast ==
=== Original Bad Girls ===
Name	Age (Note: Age at the time of filming)	Hometown	Nickname
JazMone "Jaz" Adams	22	Glendale, California	The Misbehavin' Model
Milyn "Mimi" Jensen	24	Los Angeles, California	The Star Chaser
Sarah Oliver	27	Riverdale, Georgia	The Bootylicious Blondie
Stephanie Rivera	21	New Haven, Connecticut	The Sultry Siren
Teresa Bordeaux	22	Newark, Ohio	The Inked Queen
Tess Mett	21	Louisville, Kentucky	The Rough Rider
Tiana Small	21	Harlem, New York	The Harlem Hothead

=== Replacement Bad Girls ===
Name	Age	Hometown	Nickname	Replaced
Gina "Gigi" Lopez	23	Brooklyn, New York	The Brooklyn Baller	Tess
Janelle Shanks	22	Houston, Texas	The Weaveologist	Milyn
Shanae "Nae" Thomas	21	Atlanta, Georgia	The A-Town Aggressor	Sarah
Andrea Bowman	21	Wichita, Kansas	The Rhinestone Cowgirl	Teresa
Mercedies "Benze" Webber	24	Brooklyn, New York	The Replacement's Replacement	Janelle
Hailey Wade	21	Spring, Texas	The Twerkin Texan	Shanae

=== Duration of Cast ===
Bad Girl	Episodes													
Bad Girl	1	2	3	4	5	6	7	8	9	10	11	12	13	14
JazMone	Featured													
Stephanie	Featured													
Tiana	Featured													
Teresa	Featured					removed (Note: Teresa was removed from the house after almost causing injury to Janelle's eye in a physical altercation.)								
Mimi	Featured			removed (Note: Mimi was removed from the house after harming Sarah's eyeballs during a physical altercation.)										
Sarah	Featured			removed (Note: Sarah was removed from the house after being deemed a liability following physical altercations with JazMone, Gigi, Tiana, and Mimi.)										
Tess	Left (Note: Tess voluntarily left the house after feeling a lack of privacy.)													
Gigi		Entered (Note: Gina replaced Tess.)	Featured											
Shanae				Entered (Note: Janelle and Shanae replaced Mimi and Sarah.)	Featured							Left (Note: Shanae voluntarily left the house after a physical altercation with Stephanie and Gigi.)		
Janelle				Entered (Note: Janelle and Shanae replaced Mimi and Sarah.)	Featured				removed (Note: Janelle was removed from the house after a physical altercation with Tiana and punching JazMone in the face.)					
Andrea						Entered (Note: Andrea replaced Teresa.)	Featured					Left (Note: Andrea voluntarily left out of fear of being jumped.)		
Benze										Entered (Note: Mercedies replaced Janelle.)	Featured			
Hailey													Entered (Note: Hailey replaced Shanae.)	Featured

== Episodes ==
No. overall	No. in season	Title	Original release date	Viewers (millions)
173	0	"BGC: Makin' it to Miami"	August 6, 2013	0.484
Natalie Nunn and Camilla Poindexter introduce the season 11 cast with twists, scandals and secrets.
174	1	"Premature Evacuation"	August 13, 2013	1.720
Seven new Bad Girls take Miami once again and start to Co-exist with each other. Sarah's mouth starts to rub some of the girls the wrong way that leads to an argument with Tess. Tess starts to notice she doesn't feel comfortable and leaves as quickly as she came leaving an open spot in the Bad Girls House. A night out at the club and Milyn's instigating ways start tension between Sarah and Tiana which leads to a heated altercation. Note: Tess voluntarily leaves the house.
175	2	"Waiting, Hating, Instigating"	August 20, 2013	1.603
New girl Gina arrives and makes quick enemies with Sarah after saying "Replacements are stronger" sparking a physical altercation between them. Sarah, JazMone, Teresa and Tiana go and get baby monitors to spy on the new girl while Stephanie and Mimi lock Gina in the phone room. Note: Gina replaces Tess.
176	3	"Tap In Tap Out"	August 27, 2013	1.409
The episode picks up with the fight between Sarah and Gina. Sarah finally snaps with JazMone leading to a fight. The girls have a photo shoot for Oxygen.
177	4	"Hair Today, Gone Tomorrow"	September 3, 2013	1.507
The episode continues with the fight between Sarah and Tiana but Gigi, JazMone, Tiana and Milyn jump Sarah that leads to a house brawl sending Sarah and JazMone to separate hotels for the night. Sarah confronts some of the girls who jumped her for pulling out her hair that leads to a confrontation with Milyn which ignites a physical brawl sending Sarah to the hospital. Milyn and Sarah are both sent packing due to violence continuing in the house. New Girls Janelle and Shanae enter the house with a breath of fresh air. After an argument with her boyfriend, Teresa drinks the night away at the club that shockingly leads to her attacking Stephanie. Notes: Milyn and Sarah are both removed from the house. Janelle and Shanae replace Milyn and Sarah.
178	5	"Juice-tify My Love"	September 10, 2013	1.124
The episode picks up with Teresa trying to attack Stephanie. Teresa apologizes to Stephanie. Gina's friends come for a visit and one friend took Janelle's juice. Janelle overreacted leading to the other girls being fed up with her attitude and she rubbed them the wrong way.
179	6	"The Queens of Key West"	September 17, 2013	1.147
Gigi tries to fight with Janelle, which backfires when she walks away from Janelle, leading Janelle to punch Gigi. After JazMone and Teresa jump Janelle, one girl is ultimately sent packing. The girls go to Key West. New girl Andrea comes into the house to shake things up. Notes: Teresa is removed from the house. Andrea replaces Teresa.
180	7	"The Bullyguard"	October 1, 2013	1.022
Fourth Replacement Andrea offends the majority of the house by siding with outcast Janelle.
181	8	"Public Enemy Number Two"	October 8, 2013	1.105
Shanae becomes public enemy number two; Jazmone has her first fashion show in Miami.
182	9	"Weaving With a Bang"	October 15, 2013	0.989
Stephanie is determined to find romance for her and the girls, Tiana and Janelle fight leading to another girl getting removed. Note: Janelle is removed from the house.
183	10	"'Nae, 'Nae Go Away"	October 22, 2013	1.811
Shanae continues to rub everyone the wrong way, new girl Mercedies bring a breath of fresh air into the house. Note: Mercedies replaces Janelle.
184	11	"Knock Your Socks Off"	October 29, 2013	1.118
The ladies decide to take action against Shanae when her bad attitude pushes them to the breaking point. Stephanie gets in Shanae's face resulting in a fight leading to Gina to jump in.
185	12	"Cowgirl Crapshoot"	November 5, 2013	1.335
Shanae leaves the house after witnessing everyone turn against her so quickly. Andrea becomes the next target in the house after some disagreements with Tiana, meanwhile the girls throw a pool party. Note: Shanae and Andrea both voluntarily leave the house.
186	13	"Tropical Punch"	November 19, 2013	1.019
The girls set off to Puerto Rico for a vacation, but tempers flare when 1 more replacement arrives at the house. Note: Hailey replaces Shanae.
187	14	"Paradise Lost"	November 26, 2013	1.045
After Hailey gets jumped, the producers decide to call a house meeting and decide to fine all the girls. The girls put their differences aside with Hailey to celebrate Tiana's birthday. Even after getting jumped, Hailey decides to buy balloons and a bottle for Tiana. The girls say goodbye to Miami.
188	15	"Reunion: Part 1"	December 3, 2013	1.347
The girls reunite in Los Angeles to discuss what went down in Miami. Meanwhile, Tiana & Shanae clash out. Janelle comes to the stage with a lot to say.
189	16	"Reunion: Part 2"	December 10, 2013	1.635
Janelle gets into a fight with both JazMone and Tiana. Sarah comes to the stage and turns the reunion upside down. Teresa has a tearful moment which fixes her issues with Janelle.
190	17	"Reunion: Part 3"	December 17, 2013	1.519
Mercedies attacks Shanae in a shocking fight. Sarah has a surprise for Tanisha's birthday. There's a sneak peek for the upcoming season in Chicago.
