= Bad Girls Club season 9 =

Bad Girls Club
- Season 9
- The original seven bad girls, from left to right, top to bottom: Rimanelli, Ashley, Christina, Mehgan, Erika, Falen, and Julie
- No. of episodes: 16 (including the three-part reunion)

Release
- Original network: Oxygen
- Original release: July 9 – November 11, 2012

Season chronology
- ← Previous; Season 8 Next → Season 10

The ninth season of the Oxygen reality television series Bad Girls Club is titled Bad Girls Club: Mexico, which premiered on July 9, 2012, and was filmed in Cabo San Lucas, Mexico in early 2012. Bad Girls Club: Mexico was the first season to have a three-part reunion.

== Residence ==
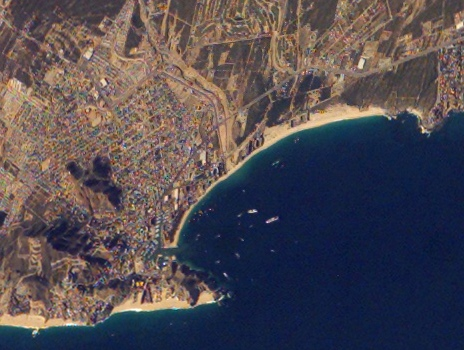
The Los Cabos Corridor, the section of Cabo where the cast lived

The cast of season nine lived at Villa Delfines beachfront property on the Los Cabos Tourist Corridor. The 'beach-chic' themed residence was once again designed by production designer Jeff Eyser and art director Alexis Karpf. Both of them presented the house tour which was posted via YouTube on August 6, 2012.

== Cast ==
The season began with seven original bad girls. One left voluntarily and two were removed by production. Three replacement bad girls were introduced in their absences later in the season.

List of Bad Girls
Name	Age (Note: Age at time of filming)	Hometown	Nickname	Replaced
Ashley Dye	21	Bartlett, Illinois	The Platinum Partygirl	—N/a
Christina Salgado	21	Jersey City, New Jersey	The Sultry Spitfire	—N/a
Erika Jordan	23	Chicago, Illinois	The Boss Bitch	—N/a
Falen Ghirmai	25	Fairfax, Virginia	The D.C. Celebrity	—N/a
Julie Ofcharsky	23	Wakefield, Massachusetts	The Devious Diva	—N/a
Mehgan James	21	Texas City, Texas	The Texas Temptation	—N/a
Rimanelli "Rima" Mellal	22	Chicago, Illinois	The Wild Child	—N/a
Andrea Jones	27	Bethpage, New York	The Pin-Up Princess	Erika
Zayden Ramos (Note: Zayden, now a transgender man, was originally known as Zuly during filming.)	28	Tampa, Florida	The Caribbean Casanova	Christina
Natasha Smoot	21	Monroe, New York	The Spunky Spitfire	Mehgan

=== Duration of Cast ===
Bad Girl	Episodes												
Bad Girl	1	2	3	4	5	6	7	8	9	10	11	12	13
Ashley	Featured												
Falen	Featured												
Julie	Featured												
Rimanelli	Featured												
Mehgan	Featured							Left (Note: Mehgan left the house after physically attacking Rima and Falen.)					Appeared (Note: Andrea, Erika, Christina, and Mehgan made an appearance for a photoshoot.)
Christina	Featured						removed (Note: Christina was removed from the house by production after a physical altercation with Rima.)						Appeared
Erika	Featured				removed (Note: Erika was removed from the house by production after a physical altercation with Rima.)								Appeared
Andrea					Entered (Note: Andrea replaced Erika.)	Featured					Left (Note: Andrea left the house voluntarily after a physical altercation with Julie, Falen, and Rima.)		Appeared
Zayden								Entered (Note: Zayden replaced Christina.)	Featured				
Natasha											Entered (Note: Natasha replaced Mehgan.)	Featured	

== Episodes ==
No. overall	No. in season	Title	Original release date	Viewers (millions)
139	1	"One Night In Mexico"	July 9, 2012	1.34
The Bad Girls go international and take Mexico by storm, but animosity takes its evil shape as feuds are formed immediately.
140	2	"Wash, Rinse, Re-beat"	July 16, 2012	1.47
Feuds continue to flare between Mehgan and Rima as well with Christina and Julie which leads to some violent surprises. Meanwhile, Christina is the target of Bad Girl wrath out at the club and leads to a house brawl between her and Julie.
141	3	"The Devil Wears Nada"	July 23, 2012	1.84
The girls put their problems aside to celebrate Mehgan's 22nd lingerie themed birthday party; however, after a spa day the house drifts further apart as two of the girls are left at home. Christina and Julie fight once again and all the roommates are over it. Meanwhile, Erika and Rima's friendship starts to tumble that leads to a shouting match.
142	4	"Girls Gone Ham"	July 30, 2012	1.94
Erika puts Rima through four days of torture, while Julie, Falen, and Mehgan oversee a plan to take down the Sad Girls once and for all. The tension between Christina and Julie explodes which leads to a confrontational fight. Notes: Erika is removed from the house.
143	5	"Pretty Girl Bounced"	August 6, 2012	1.87
Erika is sent packing after her fight with Rima. The girls go on a vacation to La Paz with their new housemate, Andrea. Meanwhile, Christina and Ashley's friendship is in ruins after Christina's fierce temper rubs Ashley the wrong way. Notes: Andrea replaces Erika.
144	6	"Mexican Meltdown"	August 20, 2012	1.50
Rima gets bad vibes from new girl Andrea after her fight with Ashley, which pushes Christina to the limit after Rima gets under her skin. Meanwhile, Andrea is questioning her relationship after a visit from her boyfriend turns ugly. Christina confronts Rima for her poor actions which leads to a fight.
145	7	"Stage Bite"	August 27, 2012	1.65
A divide begins to form within Julie, Falen and Mehgan's clique as Julie and Falen begin to notice Mehgan's true colors. Meanwhile, Rima spots a man she likes despite having a man back home. Christina is ultimately sent packing. Note: Christina is removed from the house.
146	8	"Miserella"	September 3, 2012	1.28
Mehgan realizes Julie & Falen are turning their backs on her, so she decides to stand her ground and fight back. Sexy new Bad Boy Zayden joins the cast and stirs up a night that will go down in Bad Girls Club history. Note: Zayden replaces Christina. Mehgan voluntarily leaves the house.
147	9	"The Tipping Point"	September 10, 2012	1.57
Ashley and Andrea go head to head after Andrea gets under everyone's skin. Rima tries to get Andrea out of the house. Meanwhile, one Bad Girl finds all the love she needs right in the Bad Girls Club mansion.
148	10	"Cruisin' for a Brusin'"	September 17, 2012	1.27
Andrea tries to make things right with the other girls, but backfires. Ashley is seeking out a Mr. Right, but will she find him at the clubs? Andrea is on her breaking point.
149	11	"Hate-Lanta'"	October 1, 2012	1.25
Andrea decides to battle for her stay in the house but decides to leave. The Bad Girls hit up the ATL for their final Pink Kitty dance routine, but will they be greeted with open arms or closed fists? Also, Season 8 bad girl Erica makes an appearance on the show. Note: Andrea voluntarily leaves the house. Natasha replaces Mehgan.
150	12	"Match Made in Mexico"	October 8, 2012	1.22
Falen and Julie's relationship takes a surprising turn after Julie's heartbreak gets the best of her. Meanwhile, Rima finally chooses between her two mans. Natasha questions her motives of staying in the Bad Girls Club house.
151	13	"Fist, Fist, Bang Bang"	October 22, 2012	1.56
Tempers flare when the girls are surprised to find their old roommates with unfinished business back at the house for an explosive photoshoot. Meanwhile, Falen & Julie's sexy hook-up has them unsure of their future together. Note: Erika, Christina, Mehgan and Andrea all make an appearance.
152	14	"Reunion: Part 1"	October 29, 2012	1.86
The drama-filled reunion kicks off with tensions flaring as the girls arrive at their hotel in Los Angeles and prepare to sit down face-to-face with their former roommates and rivals. Host Tanisha Thomas is ready to play referee as spitfire Andrea shows up thirsty for revenge.
153	15	"Reunion: Part 2"	November 5, 2012	1.99
The entire cast reunites in one room to talk about the most dramatic and scandalous moments of the season. Hot tempers and accusations fly as the ‘Bad Girls’ air out their dirty laundry. Mehgan gets ready to throw down against her ex-BFF’s. Erika singles out one especially devious ‘Bad Girl’ as her target.
154	16	"Reunion: Part 3"	November 11, 2012	1.90
In part 3 of the reunion, Erika and Julie face each other and talk about all the scheming and flip flopping going on into the house that leads to a fight. Rima and Mehgan consider burying the hatchet but when Julie and Falen receive an unwanted gift it leads to a final explosive "Bad" Girls blowout. Ashley and Andrea decide to make amends and be cool with one another. In addition, a first look at BGC10 is shown.
