= Natalie Nunn =

American reality television personality (born 1984)

- Born: Concord, California, U.S.
- Other name: Natalie Nunn-Payne
- Occupations: Reality television personality; rapper; executive producer
- Years active: 2004–present
- Television: Bad Girls Club; Baddies
- Spouse: Jacob Payne (m. 2012)
- Children: 1
- Website: https://www.iamnatalienunn.com/

Natalie Nunn is an American reality television personality, executive producer, and rapper. She is best known for her appearance on the fourth season of Oxygen network's reality television series Bad Girls Club. As of 2021, Nunn has been the executive producer and the main cast member of Zeus network's series Baddies.

== Early life ==
Nunn attended Aragon High School in San Mateo, California and graduated from the University of Southern California.

Nunn ran track for her high school's track team, competing in the 2002 USATF Junior Olympics. She attended the University of Southern California on a full soccer scholarship, playing as a defender on the Trojan's Women's Soccer team, with five appearances for them during the 2004 season.

== Career ==
In 2009, Nunn made her first television appearance on the fourth season of Bad Girls Club, which at the time of its premiere was the highest-rated premiere in Oxygen's history. She got into a physical altercation with fellow cast member Portia Beaman in Episode 4. On Episode 11, Nunn got into a physical altercation with fellow cast members Amber McWha, Lexie Woltz and Kendra James during a road-trip to Santa Barbara, California, and was removed from the show. During her time on the show, she coined the phrase "I Run L.A!". She became popular in media due to her large chin, which has become a meme in modern pop culture. She made further guest appearances in seasons 5, 6 and 11 of the show.

In 2011, she was a contestant on the second season of the Bad Girls Club spin-off, Love Games: Bad Girls Need Love Too. She placed second overall, losing to season 5 cast member, Lea Beaulieu. Nunn made a guest appearance on the third season of the series.

In 2012, she was featured in the Oxygen series Tanisha Gets Married, serving as a bridesmaid alongside Amber Meade and Florina Kaja for former fellow bad girl Tanisha Thomas' wedding. Later that year, her own wedding was broadcast on television to her current husband, Arizona Rattlers Arena Football League player Jacob Payne. Their wedding was broadcast on the We TV show Bridezillas, they made an appearance on The Bill Cunningham Show to discuss the wedding. Nunn went on to host her own talk show, The Tea Party with Natalie Nunn on Filmon TV.

In 2013, she began co-hosting the Bad Girls Club, Making it to the Mansion specials alongside season 8 cast member, Camilla Poindexter. She also co-hosted the Bad Girls Club Top 10 OMG Moments seasons 6-10 special. She later appeared on the first season of the spin-off Bad Girls All Star Battle, where she placed fifth overall.

In 2014, she was a cast member on the thirteenth series of Bad Girls Club: Redemption, which was a season featuring all star bad girls from the previous twelve series. She was removed in the fourth episode after a physical altercation with Alyssa Carswell and Raquel Santiago, which during the fight she was bitten by Carswell. In 2015, she was a cast member on We TV's Marriage Boot Camp: Reality Stars 2 alongside her husband, Jacob. She also was a cast member on the Lifetime reality series Mother/Daughter Experiment with her mother, Karen.

In 2018, she was a housemate in the twenty-second series of Celebrity Big Brother UK. She feuded with majority of her fellow housemates and was labelled as a "bully" by the British public, she was the first housemate evicted on Day 9. After her controversial appearance on the show she was interviewed on the The Wright Stuff.

She made other television appearances throughout the years, including on Braxton Family Values, Couples Court, Hair Battle Spectacular, The Ricki Lake Show and The Tyra Banks Show.

In 2020, she appeared on the Zeus network web series, The Conversation. In 2021, she became the creator, executive producer and main cast member of the reality web series Baddies. She also created and was the executive producer of Bad Boys.

Nunn appeared in music videos including Na Atividade by Bonde da Stronda. She has been referenced by artists in their lyrics, including by Nicki Minaj and Ceechynaa who both made fun of the length of Nunn's chin.

In 2025, she began releasing music with her first single titled Baddie Bad. She released a second single titled Doin What I Want,which trended on the social media platform, TikTok. In 2026, she performed the single at Coachella. She was featured in John Mack's single Pose for Me, which also trended on TikTok and hit the Billboard Hot 100.

== Controversies ==
In 2009, during the premier episode of the fourth season of Bad Girls Club, Nunn told fellow cast member Annie Andersen that Chris Brown was at a night club she wanted to attend, she asked Andersen if she was a fan. Andersen responded saying no, due to the domestic violence case Brown was involved in. Nunn defended Brown, saying "Who cares, Rihanna was a punk bitch, and she got her ass beat for a reason". Nunn called Rihanna a "crazy bitch" and claimed to know her, unlike Andersen. After the episode aired, Brown claimed he did not know who Nunn was.

In 2024, Nunn was accused of abusing and drugging a fan named Thomas Grimes.

== Personal life ==
Nunn dated Olamide Faison from 2003 to 2009. She has also been linked to Chris Brown, Rihanna's cousin and Shaquille O'Neal.

In 2012, she married her husband Jacob Payne. In November 2014, she revealed they were expecting their first child. In February 2015, she revealed that she suffered from a miscarriage. In late 2016, she announced that she was pregnant again. On April 16, 2017, the couple welcomed their first daughter.

== Filmography ==
Television
Year	Title	Role	Notes
2009	Bad Girls Club season 4: L.A	Self; cast member	14 episodes
2009	The Tyra Banks Show	Self; guest	2 episodes
2010	Hair Battle Spectacular	Self; judge	1 episode
2010	Bad Girls Club season 5: Miami	Self; guest	2 episodes
2010	Bad Girls Club Top 10 OMG Moments seasons 1-5	Self; co-host	TV special
2011	Run This Town	Mercury	1 episode
2011	Bad Girls Club season 6: L.A	Self; guest	2 episodes
2011	Love Games: Bad Girls Need Love Too season 2	Self; contestant	8 episodes
2011	AfterBuzz TV: Bad Girls Club season 7: New Orleans	Self; guest	1 episode
2012	Love Games: Bad Girls Need Love Too season 3	Self; guest	1 episode
2012	Tanisha Gets Married	Self; bridesmaid	8 episodes
2012	The Bill Cunningham Show	Self; guest	1 episode
2012	Bridezillas	Self; bride	3 episodes
2012-2013	The Tea Party with Natalie Nunn	Self; host	
2013	Bad Girls Club season 10: Making it to the Mansion	Self; co-host	TV special
2013	The Ricki Lake Show	Self; guest	1 episode
2013	Bad Girls All-Star Battle season 1	Self; contestant	5th place, 9 episodes
2013	AfterBuzz TV: Bad Girls All-Star Battle season 1	Self; guest	1 episode
2013	Bad Girls All-Star Battle: Twinstant Replay	Self; co-host	TV special
2013	Bad Girls Club Top 10 OMG Moments seasons 6-10	Self; co-host	TV special
2013	Bad Girls Club season 11: Making it to the Mansion	Self; co-host	TV special
2013	Bad Girls Club season 11: Miami	Self; guest	1 episode
2014	Bad Girls Club season 12: Making it to the Mansion	Self; co-host	TV special
2014	Bad Girls Club season 13: Redemption	Self; cast member	7 episodes
2015	Marriage Boot Camp: Reality Stars 2	Self; cast member	10 episodes
2015	Conversations with Cordell Capone	Self; guest	Podcast, 1 episode
2016	Mother/Daughter Experiment	Self; cast member	8 episodes
2016	The Domenick Nati Show	Self; guest	Podcast, 1 episode
2017	Citizen Dame	Self; guest	Podcast, 1 episode
2018	Celebrity Big Brother UK series 22	Self; housemate	13th place, 10 episodes
2018	Celebrity Big Brother: Bit on the Side	Self; housemate	1 episode
2018	The Wright Stuff	Self; guest	1 episode
2018	Couples Court	Self; witness	1 episode
2019	Braxton Family Values	Self; guest	2 episodes
2020	Bad Bitch Reunion	Self; cast member	Pilot
2020	The Conversation	Self; guest	Web series, 4 episodes
2021-present	Baddies	Self; cast member	Web series, executive producer
2021	Baddie Code	Self; cast member	Web series, executive producer
2021	Hollywood Unlocked	Self; guest	Podcast, 1 episode
2021	One Mo' Chance	Self; guest	Web series, 2 episodes
2021	For Real: The Story of Reality TV	Self; feature	Documentary, 1 episode
2022-present	Bad Boys	Self; producer	Web series, executive producer
2022	No Jumper	Self; guest	Podcast, 1 episode
2022	Bobby I Love You, Purr	Self; guest	Web series, 1 episode
2022	Blueface & Chrisean: Crazy in Love	Self; guest	Web series, 1 episode
2023	Basketball Wives	Self; cameo	1 episode
2023	The Breakfast Club on BET	Self; guest	1 episode
2024	Bad vs. Wild	Self; contestant	Web series, 3 episodes
2024	Transforming Rollie	Self; guest	Web series, 1 episode
2024	Aunt-Tea Podcast	Self; guest	Podcast, 1 episode
2025-present	Baddies Gone Wild	Self; cast member	Web series, executive producer
2025	Funky Friday	Self; guest	Podcast, 1 episode
2026	Scotty with the Baby	Self; guest	Web series, 1 episode
2026	The Spell Off	Self; guest	1 episode

Music video
Year	Title	Artist	Role
2010	Smack You	Kimberly Cole	Self; cameo
2011	Nawti	Olu Maintain	Self; model
2013	Na Atividade	Bonde da Stronda	Self; dancer
2024	That’s a Baddie	Matt Cash	Self; Baddies cast member
2025	Whim Whamiee	Rella Gz featuring Tee-Tee, Coco and Hurricane Em	Self; model

== Discography ==
Singles
Year	Title	Notes
2009	I Run L.A	Unreleased
2025	Baddie Bad	Debut single, featuring Lemuel Plummer
2025	Doin What I Want	
2026	YAYA	featuring Blueface, Compton Av, India Love, Lola Brooke & Steelz
2026	Say Less	
2026	Big One	featuring Diamond the Body & Koldkilla
2026	Pretty Little Secret	
2026	Bad Bitch Alarm	featuring BossMan Dlow
2026	Oh U Nasty	featuring Lola Brooke, Mariahlynn, Compton Av & Steelz
2026	Passport Baddies	
2026	Baddies In This House	featuring Zeddy Will

EP
Year	Title	Notes
2025	Queen Baddie	Debut EP
2026	Already Rich	

== Awards and accomplishments ==
Bad Girls Club Hall of Fame

- Best Twerk (2015)
