= Curtis High School =

Public school in New York City

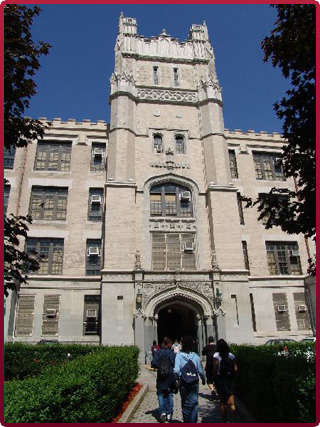

Location
- 105 Hamilton Ave; Staten Island, New York 10301; United States; 40°38′43″N 74°4′54″W

Information
- Type: Public
- Established: February 9, 1904
- School district: New York City Department of Education
- NCES School ID: 360010301939
- Principal: Nicholas Mele
- Teaching staff: 152.32 (on an FTE basis)
- Grades: 9-12
- Enrollment: 2,153 (2022-2023)
- Student to teacher ratio: 14.13
- Campus: City: Large
- Colors: Maroon and White
- Mascot: Warriors
- Newspaper: Curtis Log
- Yearbook: Crosswinds
- Website: www.curtishs.org

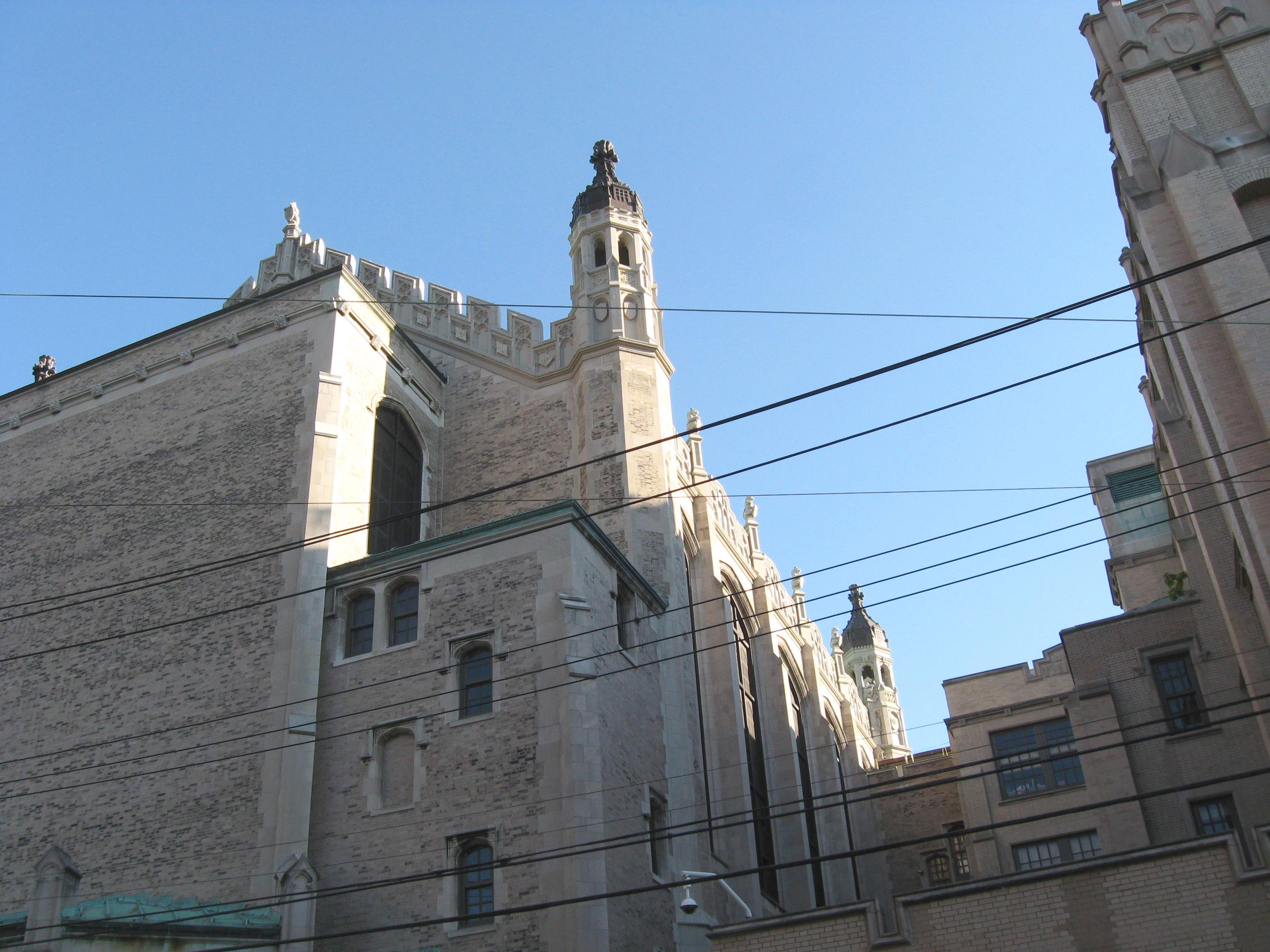
North side

Curtis High School, operated by the New York City Department of Education, is one of seven public high schools located in Staten Island, New York City, New York. It was founded on February 9, 1904, the first high school on Staten Island.

== History ==
Curtis High School is named after nationally prominent Republican writer and orator George W. Curtis, who lived nearby. The school was the first public building built following the consolidation of Greater New York. It was part of a plan to erect a major high school in each of the outlying boroughs, with Erasmus Hall High School in Brooklyn, Morris High School in the Bronx, and Flushing High School in Queens being the other three. It was designed by the architect C. B. J. Snyder. The cornerstone was laid in 1902, it was completed and opened 1904. The original building of brick and limestone is dominated by a large square turreted tower inspired by English medieval models. The first principal was Columbia graduate Oliver Durfee Clark, who served 1904 to 1906. The second principal (1906–1912) was Harry Freeman Towle, a graduate of Dartmouth College. Additions were made to the building in 1922, 1925 and 1937. John M Avent (Columbia Graduate, author) was principal from 1924 to the late 1940s. Curtis was designated a New York City Landmark on October 12, 1982. The gym and cafeteria wings were added at a later date as additions to the original building's neo-Gothic architecture.

== Academics ==
Curtis offers an International Baccalaureate Scholarship Honors programs IB-DP and IB-CP with accelerated curriculum and Advanced Placement courses, and courses include nursing, NJROTC, performing arts, visual arts, business/computer institute, CoOp, human and legal studies, and journalism.

== Extracurricular activities ==
Curtis offers a robotics team, National Honor Society, chess club, Key Club, black and Hispanic awareness clubs, film club, Moot Court, the Curtis Players, jazz band, orchestra, dance, symphonic band, the Curtis Log (newspaper), Crosswinds (yearbook), math team, criminal law and justice mentoring program, peer mediation and conflict resolution programs.

=== Sports ===
Curtis fields over thirty varsity teams, including a swimming team, as well as golf, bowling, volleyball, soccer, basketball, wrestling baseball/softball, tennis, track/cross country, gymnastics, lacrosse and football teams. In addition, Curtis club teams include boys' varsity and junior varsity, and girls' varsity Ultimate teams. The Curtis High School Track was named after Abel Kiviat and the Baseball Field was renamed Bobby Thomson Field in 2007

=== Enrollment ===
Curtis has a total enrollment of about 3,006 and is open to residents of New York City entering either ninth or tenth grade. Enrollment requirements vary depending on which of the ten "houses" the student is going to be enrolled. There are zoned programs where enrollment is based mostly on geography, with Staten Island residents having priority over all other boroughs. Within Staten Island, geographical areas closer to the school have priority over all other areas of Staten Island. Most other programs rely either on the prospective student's grades and city standardized tests or specialized enrollment tests.

The school's population is 38% African American, 31% Hispanic, 22.9% White and 7.5% Asian.

=== Feeder patterns and admissions ===
All New York City students entering high school must apply to schools, as there are no zoning boundaries for high schools in New York City. Only special zoned programs have geographical restrictions whereby certain areas of Staten Island have priority over all of the rest of New York City.

== Notable alumni ==
Name	Year	Profession	Notability	Reference
Vincent R. Capodanno	1947	Priest	Priest and Missioner who was killed in action during the Vietnam War	
Joseph F. Merrell	1944	Soldier	Medal of Honor recipient	
Jeb Stuart Magruder	1952	Politician	Advisor to Richard Nixon and Watergate scandal conspirator	
Ralph J. Lamberti	1948	Politician	Staten Island Borough president from 1984 to 1989	
Alfred E. Santangelo	1930	Politician	Former United States congressman	
Loring McMillen	1924	Historian	Official Staten Island historian	
Florina Kaja	Transferred (attended until 1998)	Reality TV personality	Bad Girls Club and Bad Girls All-Star Battle	
Lois Lowry	Transferred (attended until 1952)	Writer	Children's book author	
Amy Vanderbilt	Transferred (attended until 1924)	Writer	author of the best-selling Complete Book of Etiquette (1952	
Emily Genauer	1929	Art Critic	Pulitzer Prize for Criticism winner	
Mario Buatta	1953	Interior Designer	interior designer who designed for several famous clients	
Betty Aberlin	1959	Actress	Best known for Playing Lady Aberlin on Mister Rogers' Neighborhood	
Selita Ebanks	2001	Model	Victoria's Secret Model	
RZA	1987	Musician	hip-hop recording artist, and producer, and member of the Wu-Tang Clan	
Richie Castellano	1998	Musician	singer, songwriter, musician, guitarist and keyboard player for the Blue Öyster Cult	
David O. Stewart	1969	Author	historian and author	
Michael Henry Heim	1961	Author	literary translator, inducted as a fellow of the American Academy of Arts and Sciences	
Bobby Thomson	1942	Baseball Player	baseball player for the New York Giants, famous for "the Shot Heard 'Round the World"	
Jack Hynes	1938	Soccer Player	Soccer Hall of Fame and MVP of the American Soccer League	
Frank Fernández	1961	Baseball Player	MLB player, Yankees, Athletics, Senators, Cubs	
James Jenkins	1987	Football Player	Former Tight End for the Washington Redskins	
Dominique Easley	2010	Football Player	NFL first round pick who played for the Patriots and Rams	
Halil Kanacević	2009	Basketball Player	Professional basketball player in Europe; played college basketball at Saint Joseph's	
Abel Kiviat	1908	Runner	Olympic Silver Medalist in the 1500m run	
Hassan Martin	2013	Basketball Player	Professional basketball player in Europe and Asia; played college basketball at Rhode Island	
Hank Majeski	1935	Baseball Player	MLB Player; Braves, Yankees, Athletics, White Sox, Indians, Orioles	
Steve Gregory	2002	Football Player	NFL Player; Chargers, Patriots	
Mouhamadou Gueye	2016	Basketball Player	Forward for the Toronto Raptors	
Vernon Turner	1986	Football Player	former NFL Player	
Anthony Varvaro	2002	Baseball player	Former MLB pitcher and NYPD police officer	
Shemiah LeGrande	2004	Football Player	Former NFL Player	
Isaiah Wilkerson	2008	Basketball Player	Professional basketball player in Mexico and Europe; played college basketball at NJIT	
Irv Constantine	1928	Football Player	Played 1 NFL game for the Staten Island Stapletons	
Sonny Ruberto	1964	Baseball Player	Former MLB player and coach	
Terry Crowley	1965	Baseball Player and Coach	3x World Series Champion	
Elmer Ripley	1921	Basketball Coach	Basketball Hall of Famer	

== Parental support ==
Parents collaborate with the school's administration and its staff through monthly PTA meetings, PTA newsletters, School Leadership Team meetings, Gear-Up, Principal's Consultative Council, Health Fair, HIV AIDS Team, and the football, track, robotics and performing arts parents clubs.

== Community support ==
Partnerships:

- Liberty Partnership Mentoring Program (CSI)
- Gear-Up
- Discovery Institute (CSI)
- Brooklyn Polytechnic University Center for Youth in Engineering and Science
- Curtis HS Career Connections
- Global Ambassadors
- Corporations:
  - Infinity Broadcasting
  - MIX 102.7 FM
  - O’Melveny & Myers Law Firm
- Higher education institutions:
  - College of Staten Island
  - St. John's University
- Cultural/arts organizations:
  - Snug Harbor
- Community-based organizations:
  - NYCID
  - Liberty Partnership
  - Foward [sic] P.A.S.S.
- Hospital outreach:
  - Sea View Hospital Rehabilitation Center and Home
  - Staten Island University Hospital
  - St. Vincent's Hospital
  - Egger Nursing Home
- Financial institutions:
  - Federal Reserve Bank Mentoring Program

== Schoolwide awards and recognition ==
- 7-time PSAL Girls' Bowling Championship
- 13-time PSAL Boys' Cross Country City Championship (1928, 1929, 1930 [nationals], 1931, 1933, 1935, 1938)
- 8-time PSAL Boys' Football Championship (1998, 1999, 2002, 2007, 2009, 2016, 2017,2024)
- 3-time PSAL Boys' Golf City Championship
- 2-time PSAL Girls' Cross Country City Championship
- 3 time Boys' PSAL Indoor Track City Championships, (first one in 1909 with help of Olympic Silver medal winner Abel Kiviat),1928
- Boys' PSAL Bowling Championship
- Girls' PSAL Basketball "A" City Championship (2011, 2012, 2013)
- Girls' PSAL Golf City Championship
- 2-time Girls' PSAL Lacrosse City Championship (2015, 2016)
- Boys' PSAL Lacrosse City Championship (2016)
- Boys' PSAL Basketball "A" City Championship
- Boys' PSAL Wrestling "A" City Championship
- 4-time Girls' PSAL Wrestling Championship (2013, 2014, 2015, 2024)
- Boys' PSAL Soccer Championship (1915, 1917)
- Boys' PSAL Baseball Championship (1943, 1961, 1962)
- Boys' PSAL Tennis Singles Championship (1917)
- Boys' Lacrosse Semi Finals NYC (1915,2017,2019)

== Other ==
Curtis alumn Jason Defazio was killed on 9/11. He worked on the 104th floor of the World Trade Center at Cantor Fitzgerald.

== See also ==
- List of New York City Designated Landmarks in Staten Island
- National Register of Historic Places listings in Richmond County, New York
