= Pollo (band) =

Brazilian rap group

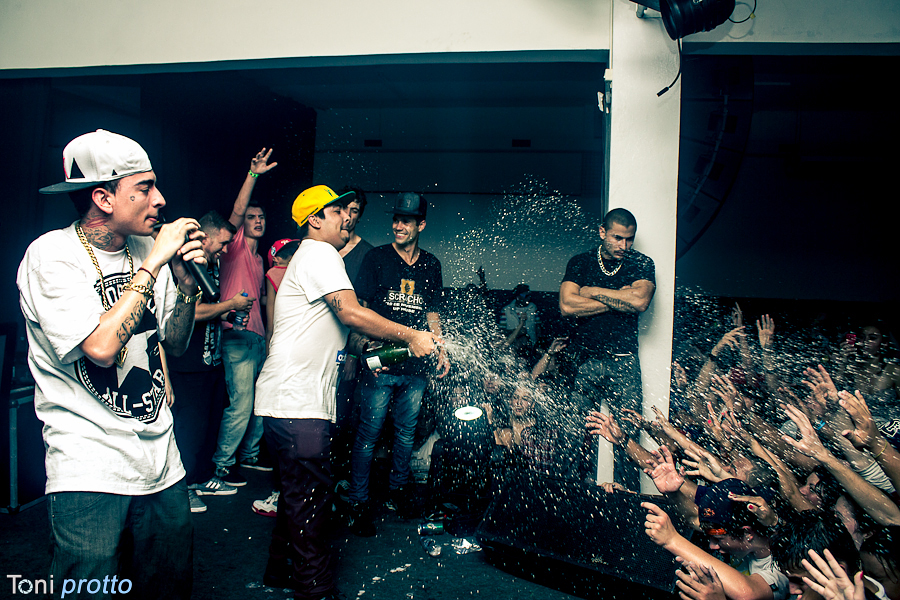
- Pollo (to the right), performing with MC Guimê.

Background information
- Origin: São Paulo, Brazil
- Genres: Hip hop, pop rap
- Years active: 2011-2013; 2013-active
- Labels: Casa 1, Maximo Produtora, Radar Records, Som Livre
- Members: Luiz Tomim; DJ Kalfani; Adriel de Menezes
- Website: www.issoepollo.com.br

Pollo (sometimes stylized as POLLO) is a rap group formed in 2010 in São Paulo, Brazil by the MCs Luiz Tomim (also known as “Tomim”), Adriel de Menezes (also known as "AdR"), and DJ Kalfani. The band found fame with its hit “Vagalumes”, which has had over 30 million views on YouTube. In September 2013, after the disappearance of Adriel Luis Tomim, DJ Kalfani and Luiz Tomim announced they were fulfilling the touring schedule and commitments until 31 December 2013, when they would disband and stop performing. Three days later, after a decision by the remaining band members, Adriel stated that the band would not discontinue.

== Biography ==
=== 2011-2012: Vim Pra Dominar o Mundo ===
The group was originally formed in 2010, recording and writing entirely in a home production environment, and distributing their music via the Internet. The first song which was professionally studio recorded was "Trama", in 2010. Pollo became known on the Internet for the song "Zica do Bagui", from collaborator Bonde da Stronda. In 2012, they announced a new member, DJ Kalfani, son of KL Jay from Racionais MC’s. In 2012, the group released the clips "Trama", "Pirituba City", "As Quatro", "Buxixos & Simpatias", and "Vagalumes".

According to Brasil Hot Airplay, the song "Vagalumes" was one of the most requested songs on radio. It was also included in the soundtrack of Rede Globo's telenovela Sangue Bom. With the participation of singer Ivo Mozart, the song was nominated in, and won, the categories of best song and music video of the year. The song currently has over 30 million views on YouTube. In the same year, the band released their first album titled "Vim Para Dominar o Mundo" which could be downloaded for free on iTunes.

=== 2013–present ===
In 2014, the band released a new album, under the label Som Livre, called "777".

== Discography ==
=== Albums ===
- Vim Pra Dominar o Mundo (2012)
- 777 (2014)

=== Singles ===
- "Vagalumes" (featuring Ivo Mozart)
- "Zika do Bagui" (with Bonde da Stronda)
- "Piritubacity"
- "As Quatro"
- "Trama"
- "Buxixo & Simpatia"
- "Exceção da Regra"
- "Fiesta Muy Loka"
- "Vim Pra Dominar O Mundo"(feat Terra Preta)

== Music videos ==
Year	Song	Album
2011	Pollo - Trama (Feat. Fernanda Chagas)	Vim Pra Dominar o Mundo
2011	Pollo - Buxixos & Simpatas	Vim Pra Dominar o Mundo
2011	Pollo - Piritubacity	Vim Pra Dominar o Mundo
2012	Pollo - Exceção da Regra	
2012	Pollo - As Quatro	Vim Pra Dominar o Mundo
2012	Pollo - Vagalumes (Feat. Ivo Mozart)	Vim Pra Dominar o Mundo
2012	Bonde da Stronda (Feat. Pollo) - Zika do Bagui	Corporação
2013	Pollo - Meu Bonde	Vim Pra Dominar o Mundo
2013	Pollo - Love Song	Vim Pra Dominar o Mundo
2014	Pollo - Seu Lugar (Feat. P.I.)	Vim Pra Dominar o Mundo
