= Bad Boys (TV series) =

2022 American reality television series

- Genre: Reality
- Created by: Natalie Nunn
- Inspired by: Bad Girls Club; Baddies
- Country of origin: United States
- Original language: English
- No. of seasons: 4
- No. of episodes: 26

Production
- Executive producers: Natalie Nunn; Leumuel Plummer; Tameka Stevenson; Jonathan Wright; Jason L. Tolbert; Mark Scheibal; Darryl Farmer
- Production locations: Los Angeles (season 1); Texas (season 2); Dominican Republic (season 3); Cancun (season 4)
- Camera setup: Multi-camera
- Running time: 40–60 minutes

Original release
- Network: Zeus Network
- Release: March 20, 2022 – present

Related
- Baddies

Bad Boys is a reality television series that premiered on March 20, 2022, on the Zeus Network. It is a spin-off from the Zeus series Baddies, which itself is inspired by the former Oxygen series Bad Girls Club. Bad Boys is executive produced by Natalie Nunn and has aired 4 seasons.

The series documents the interactions of several young men living together while participating in promotional events, which frequently involve verbal and physical altercations. The first four seasons have been filmed in different locations. The first season, Bad Boys: Los Angeles, was filmed in Los Angeles, California. The second season, Bad Boys: Texas, followed the cast on a road trip in Texas.

Following a period of uncertainty about the series’ continuation, Zeus Network CEO Lemuel Plummer teased a potential third season in March 2025, in a joint Instagram post with Natalie Nunn, the franchise’s creator and executive producer. The post featured the series’ title card and the caption “trying to see sum…”, accompanied by the song “Bad Boys” by Inner Circle, prompting speculation about the show’s return.

Zeus Network subsequently announced the third season, titled Bad Boys: Dominican Republic. The season was filmed in the Dominican Republic, with auditions held in Los Angeles in January 2026. It premiered on May 3, 2026, followed by a three-part reunion that concluded on August 16, 2026.

The fourth season, Bad Boys: Cancun, premiered on September 6, 2026. Filmed in Cancún, Mexico, the season features a new group of cast members living together while competing for the title of “Man of the House” and navigating interpersonal conflicts. The season is currently airing on Zeus Network, with new episodes released weekly.

== Overview and casting ==
In November 2021, Zeus Network announced casting calls for a new series with the working title Bad Boys Club. Natalie Nunn, who was featured on the fourth season of the former Oxygen series Bad Girls Club and the current Zeus series Baddies, was confirmed as an executive producer.

=== Series overview ===
Season	Episodes	Originally released	
Season	Episodes	First released	Last released
1	12	March 20, 2022	June 5, 2022
2	14	April 23, 2023	July 23, 2023
3	16	May 3, 2026	August 3, 2026

=== Timeline of cast members ===
Main cast members
Cast member	Seasons			
Cast member	Los Angeles	Texas	Dominican Republic	Cancún
Andrew Caldwell	Main			
Anthony Hernandez	Main	Main		
Curtis Golden	Main			
Durell "Relly B" Smylie	Main	Main		
Dylan Woods	Main			
Jonathan Wright	Main	Main		
Kabraun "Gutta K" Stone	Main			
Kerrion Franklin	Main	Main		
Mario "Rio" Skot	Main			
Maurice "Moolah Moe" Sinkler	Main			
Milan Christopher	Main			
William the Baddest	Main			
Adonis "Adonis King of Miami" DFetty		Main	Guest	
Andre "Ahrah Banga" Brown Jr.		Main	Guest	Main
Christopher "Big Lue" Hughes		Main		
Christopher "Prince Michael" Harty		Main	Guest	
De'Mario "Raz-B" Thornton		Main		
Devon "Chef Dee" Bussell		Main		
Jacobe "Mocity Jaybee" Battin		Main	Guest	
Orlando Brown		Main	Guest	
Anthony "Alpha Ant" Haynes			Main	
Dejuan "Poodie Tang" Minnieweather			Main	
Jameson "Island Boi" Strachan			Main	Main
Jayquan "Jayda" Johnson			Main	Main
John "John the Don" Canty			Main	
Korri "Korri Samaad" Benton-Pettiford			Main	
Miguel "Check the Star" Garcia			Main	
Myles “Cozy” Campbell			Main	
Noel "Big Noel" Williams			Main	
Pariz Motton			Main	
Rashod "Shoddy" Brown			Main	Main
Tremayne "Seis Blu" Bluford			Main	
Timothy "Landon Frost" Branch			Main	
Tyleel “Lynx” Lang			Main	Main
Alvin "Mustang" Albritton				Main
Big Solo				Main
Christopher “Chris” Hardie				Main
Cole "Cohl" Woolbright				Main
Darreun “Dukane” Kamara				Main
Darryl "Lil Scrappy" Richardson III				Main
David “Dway” Crutcher				Main
Eric "GMFTuTu" Adams				Main
Hakeem "Dully DMiracle" Ward				Main
Jacob "Jasty"				Main
Jermani “Krown” Leavy				Main
Osiris "YK Osiris" Williams				Main
Suge the Don				Main
Supporting cast members
Natalie Nunn	Guest	Guest	Guest	Guest
Shamar Marco			Guest	

== Bad Boys Los Angeles (2022) ==
The cast of the first season was confirmed in March 2022. The trailer was released on March 13, with a premiere date announced for March 20. This seasons reunion was cancelled due to cast members backing out last minute.

=== Cast ===
Original Cast	Age	City
Andrew Caldwell	43	Saint Louis, Missouri
Anthony Hernandez	31	Houston, Texas
Curtis Golden	27	New York City, New York
Durell "Relly B" Smylie	26	Baton Rouge, Louisiana
Dylan Woods	22	Shelbyville, Tennessee
Kabraun "Gutta K" Stone	21	Atlanta, Georgia
Kerrion Franklin	34	Fort Worth, Texas
Maurice "Moolah Moe" Sinkler	33	Rochester, New York
Milan Christopher	38	Chicago, Illinois
William the Baddest	28	Los Angeles, California

Replacement Cast	Age	City	Replaced
Jonathan Wright	25	Dallas, Texas	Andrew
Mario "Rio" Skot	29	Memphis, Tennessee	William

=== Duration of cast ===
Cast member	Episodes											
Cast member	1	2	3	4	5	6	7	8	9	10	11	12
Anthony	Featured	Featured	Featured	Featured	Featured	Featured	Featured	Featured	Featured	Featured	Featured	Featured
Curtis	Featured	Featured	Featured	Featured	Featured	Featured	Featured	Featured	Featured	Featured	Featured	Featured
Dylan	Featured	Featured	Featured	Featured	Featured	Featured	Featured	Featured	Featured	Featured	Featured	Featured
Gutta K	Featured	Featured	Featured	Featured	Featured	Featured	Featured	Featured	Featured	Featured	Featured	Featured
Kerrion	Featured	Featured	Featured	Featured	Featured	Featured	Featured	Featured	Featured	Featured	Featured	Featured
Milan	Featured	Featured	Featured	Featured	Featured	Featured	Featured	Featured	Featured	Featured	Featured	Featured
Moolah	Featured	Featured	Featured	Featured	Featured	Featured	Featured	Featured	Featured	Featured	Featured	Featured
Relly B	Featured	Featured	Featured	Featured	Featured	Featured	Featured	Featured	Featured	Featured	Featured	Featured
Rio								Entered (Note: Rio replaced William.)	Featured	Featured	Featured	Featured
Jonathan							Entered (Note: Johnathan replaced Andrew.)	Featured	removed (Note: Jonathan was removed from the house after a physical altercation with Rio.)			
William	Featured	Featured	Featured	Left (Note: William voluntarily left the show after an altercation with Moolah.)				Appeared (Note: William made an appearance for a house party.)				
Andrew	Left (Note: Andrew voluntarily left the show after several altercations and disagreements with the other cast members and production.)											

== Bad Boys Texas (2023) ==
The cast of the second season was confirmed on March 9, 2023. The trailer was released on April 16, with a premiere date announced for April 23. Bad Boys features Former B2K Member Raz B, Disney Star Orlando Brown & Celebrity Hairstylist Jonathan Wright.

=== Cast ===
Cast	Age	City
Andre "Ahrah Banga" Brown Jr.	31	Washington, D.C.
Anthony Hernandez	31	Houston, Texas
Christopher "Big Lue" Hughes	28	Miami, Florida
Christopher "Prince Michael" Harty	33	Miami, Florida
De'Mario "Raz-B" Thornton	37	Cleveland, Ohio
Devon "Chef Dee" Bussell	28	Chicago, IL
Durell "Relly B" Smylie	26	Baton Rouge, Louisiana
Jacobe "Mocity Jaybee" Battin	26	Houston, Texas
Jonathan Wright	25	Dallas, Texas
Kerrion Franklin	34	Fort Worth, Texas
Orlando Brown	35	Los Angeles, California

Cast	Age	City	Replaced
Adonis "Adonis King of Miami" DFetty	30	Miami, Florida	Anthony

=== Duration of cast ===
Cast member	Episodes													
Cast member	1	2	3	4	5	6	7	8	9	10	11	12	13	14
Ahrah	Featured	Featured	Featured	Featured	Featured	Featured	Featured	Featured	Featured	Featured	Featured	Featured	Featured	Featured
Chef Dee	Featured	Featured	Featured	Featured	Featured	Featured	Featured	Featured	Featured	Featured	Featured	Featured	Featured	Featured
Jonathan	Featured	Featured	Featured	Featured	Featured	Featured	Featured	Featured	Featured	Featured	Featured	Featured	Featured	Featured
Kerrion	Featured	Featured	Featured	Featured	Featured	Featured	Featured	Featured	Featured	Featured	Featured	Featured	Featured	Featured
Mocity	Featured	Featured	Featured	Featured	Featured	Featured	Featured	Featured	Featured	Featured	Featured	Featured	Featured	Featured
Orlando	Featured	Featured	Featured	Featured	Featured	Featured	Featured	Featured	Featured	Featured	Featured	Featured	Featured	Featured
Prince	Featured	Featured	Featured	Featured	Featured	Featured	Featured	Featured	Featured	Featured	Featured	Featured	Featured	Featured
Raz B	Featured	Featured	Featured	Featured	Featured	Featured	Featured	Featured	Featured	Featured	Featured	Featured	Featured	Featured
Relly	Featured	Featured	Featured	Featured	Featured	Featured	Featured	Featured	Left (Note: Relly voluntarily left the show after a family emergency.)		Returned (Note: Relly returned to the show.)	Featured	Featured	Featured
Adonis						Entered (Note: Adonis replaced Anthony.)	Featured	Featured	Featured	Featured	Featured	Featured	Featured	Featured
Big Lue	Featured	Featured	Featured	Featured	Featured	Featured	Featured	Left (Note: Big Lue voluntarily left the show after a health scare.)						
Anthony	Featured	Featured	Left (Note: Anthony voluntarily left the show after multiple altercations with Chef Dee and Jonathan.)											

== Bad Boys Dominican Republic (2026) ==
=== Cast ===
Original Cast	Age	Hometown
Anthony “Alpha Ant” Haynes	27	Rochester, New York
Miguel “Check the Star” Garcia	38	Tampa, Florida
Jameson “Island Boi” Strachan	37	Nassau, Bahamas
Myles “Cozy” Campbell	29	New Orleans, Louisiana
John “John the Don” Canty	27	Detroit, Michigan
Jayquan “Jayda” Johnson	26	Richmond, Virginia
Timothy “Landon” Legone	21	Jacksonville, Florida
Korri “Korri Samaad” Benton-Pettiford	28	Jersey City, New Jersey
Noel Williams	25	Oakland, California
Tyleel “Lynx” Lang	27	Philadelphia, Pennsylvania
Dejuan “Poodie” Minnie	23	Bastrop, Louisiana
Rashod “Shoddy” Brown	26	Detroit, Michigan
Pariz Motton	31	Baltimore, Maryland
Tremayne “Seis” Bluford	25	Lincoln, Nebraska

Supporting Cast	Age	Hometown
Andre “Ahrah Banga” Brown Jr.	34	St. Louis, Missouri
Adonis Difetty	33	Miami, Florida
Christopher “Prince” Harty	36	Miami, Florida
Jacobe “Mocity DL” Battin	29	Houston, Texas
Orlando Brown	38	Los Angeles, California
Shamar McCoy	29	Atlanta, Georgia

=== Duration of cast ===
Cast member	Episodes											
Cast member	1	2	3	4	5	6	7	8	9	10	11	12
Check	Featured	Featured	Featured	Featured	Featured	Featured	Featured	Featured	Featured	Featured	Featured	Featured
Cozy	Featured	Featured	Featured	Featured	Featured	Featured	Featured	Featured	Featured	Featured	Featured	Featured
Island Boi	Absent	Featured	Featured	Featured	Featured	Featured	Featured	Featured	Featured	Featured	Featured	Featured
Jayda	Featured	Featured	Featured	Featured	Featured	Featured	Featured	Featured	Featured	Featured	Featured	Featured
John	Featured	Featured	Featured	Featured	Featured	Featured	Featured	Featured	Featured	Featured	Featured	Featured
Korri	Featured	Featured	Featured	Featured	Featured	Featured	Featured	Featured	Featured	Featured	Featured	Featured
Lynx	Featured	Featured	Featured	Featured	Featured	Featured	Featured	Featured	Featured	Featured	Featured	Featured
Noel	Featured	Featured	Featured	Featured	Featured	Featured	Featured	Featured	Featured	Featured	Featured	Featured
Seis	Featured	Featured	Featured	Featured	Featured	Featured	Featured	Featured	Featured	Featured	Featured	Featured
Shoddy	Featured	Featured	Featured	Featured	Featured	Featured	Featured	Featured	Featured	Featured	Featured	Featured
Ahrah						Entered	Featured	Featured	Featured	Featured	Featured	Featured
Adonis								Entered	Featured	Featured	Featured	Featured
Shamar								Entered	Featured	Featured	Featured	Featured
Prince									Entered	Featured	Featured	Featured
Mocity											Entered	Featured
Landon	Featured	Featured	Featured	Featured	Featured	Featured	Featured	Left (Note: Landon voluntarily left the show to be with Poodie.)	Absent	Absent	Returned (Note: Landon returned to the show.)	Featured
Poodie	Featured	Featured	Featured	Featured	Featured	Featured	Featured	Left (Note: Poodie voluntarily left the show due to a broken jaw.)	Absent	Absent	Returned (Note: Poodie returned to the show.)	Featured
Pariz	Featured	Featured	Featured	Featured	Featured	Featured	Featured	Absent	Absent	Absent	Left (Note: Pariz voluntarily left the show due to a shoulder injury.)	
Ant	Featured	Featured	Featured	Featured	Left (Note: Ant voluntarily left the show after being over the experience.)							

== Bad Boys Cancun (2026) ==
=== Cast ===
Cast	Age	Hometown
Alvin “Mustang” Albritton	40	Atlanta, Georgia
Andre “Ahrah Banga” Brown Jr.	34	Washington, D.C.
Big Solo	27	Dallas, Texas
Christopher “Chris” Hardie	25	Vincent, Alabama
Cole “Cohl” Woolbright	26	Roscoe, Illinois
Darreun “Dukane” Kamara	26	Atlanta, Georgia
David “Dway” Crutcher	33	Cincinnati, Ohio
Hakeem “Dully D’Miracle” Ward	23	Petersburg, Virginia
Eric “GMFTuTu” Adams	22	Houston, Texas
Jameson “Island Boi” Strachan	38	Nassau, Bahamas
Jayquan “Jayda” Johnson	27	Richmond, Virginia
Rashod “Shoddy” Brown	26	Detroit, Michigan
Suge the Don	24	Washington, D.C.

Replacement Cast	Age	Hometown	Replaced
Jermani “Krown” Leavy	27	Las Vegas, Nevada	Chris
Jacob "Jasty"		New York City, New York	Ahrah

Supporting Cast	Age	Hometown
Osiris “YK Osiris” Williams	27	Jacksonville, Florida
Darryl “Lil Scrappy” Richardson III	42	Atlanta, Georgia

=== Duration of cast ===
Cast member	Episodes										
Cast member	1	2	3	4	5	6	7	8	9	10	11
Cohl	Featured	Featured	Featured	Featured	Featured	Featured	Featured	Featured	Featured	Featured	Featured
Dukane	Featured	Featured	Featured	Featured	Featured	Featured	Featured	Featured	Featured	Featured	Featured
Dully	Featured	Featured	Featured	Featured	Featured	Featured	Featured	Featured	Featured	Featured	Featured
Dway	Featured	Featured	Featured	Featured	Featured	Featured	Featured	Featured	Featured	Featured	Featured
Jayda	Featured	Featured	Featured	Featured	Featured	Featured	Featured	Featured	Featured	Featured	Featured
Shoddy	Featured	Featured	Featured	Featured	Featured	Featured	Featured	Featured	Featured	Featured	Featured
Solo	Featured	Featured	Featured	Featured	Featured	Featured	Featured	Featured	Featured	Featured	Featured
Suge	Featured	Featured	Featured	Featured	Featured	Featured	Featured	Featured	Featured	Featured	Featured
TuTu	Featured	Featured	Featured	Featured	Featured	Featured	Featured	Featured	Featured	Featured	Featured
Krown					Entered (Note: Krown replaced Chris.)	Featured	Featured	Featured	Featured	Featured	Featured
Jasty										Entered (Note: Jasty replaced Ahrah.)	Featured
Osiris							Entered	Featured	Featured	Featured	Featured
Scrappy										Entered	Featured
Mustang	Featured	Featured	Featured	Featured	Featured	Featured	Featured	Featured	Featured	Left (Note: Mustang voluntarily left the show due to multiple injuries.)	
Ahrah	Featured	Featured	Featured	Left (Note: Ahrah voluntarily left the show due to his injured neck from last season's reunion.)							
Chris	Featured	Left (Note: Chris voluntarily left the show due to a broken jaw.)									
