= Stronda Style =

Demo album by Bonde da Stronda
- Released: 2008
- Recorded: 2007–2008
- Genre: pop, hip hop
- Label: self-released
- Producer: Mr. Thug

Bonde da Stronda chronology
| Stronda Style | Nova Era da Stronda |

Singles from Stronda Style
- 1. "Cara Metade"; 2. "Conversas e fatos" 3. "Nossa Quimica"; 4. "Garota Diferente"

Stronda Style is the first album by Bonde da Stronda, it was recorded between 2007 and 2008. The demo contains 16 tracks, contains some of the greatest hits of the group as "Nossa Química" and "Garota Diferente".

== Track listing ==
All tracks are written by Mr. Thug with the help of Léo Stronda.

| No. | Title | Length |
|---|---|---|
| 1. | "Alguém Aqui Te Ama" (demo) |
| 2. | "Cara Metade" (demo) |
| 3. | "Conversas e fatos" (demo) |
| 4. | "Garota Diferente" (demo) |
| 5. | "Instinto Putão" (demo) |
| 6. | "Malandro Vagabundo" (demo) |
| 7. | "Manual da Stronda" (demo) |
| 8. | "Mar Playsson" (demo) |
| 9. | "Mina Mercenaria" (demo) |
| 10. | "Minha Namorada" (demo) |
| 11. | "Nossa Química" (demo) |
| 12. | "Playssonzada na área" (demo) |
| 13. | "Primeira Vista" (demo) |
| 14. | "Stronda Style" (demo) |
| 15. | "Vida de Playsson" (demo) |
| 16. | "Vida de Thug" (demo) |

Notes

- "Cara Metade" and "Conversas e fatos" were re-recorded, but only released as singles, without being part of another album.
- "Garota Diferente" and "Mar Playsson" were re-recorded and put on the album Nova Era da Stronda.
- "Nossa Química" is re-recorded numerous times in various versions, it was incorporated into the album Nova Era da Stronda and in the mixtape Corporação.

== Personnel ==
- Mr. Thug – lead vocals, composition, production
- Léo Stronda – vocals, composition
- Mc Night – vocals

== Sources ==
- http://letras.mus.br/bonde-da-stronda/cds.php
- https://web.archive.org/web/20131020120549/http://www.playssonlandia.com/2009/02/bonde-da-stronda-stronda-style-2008.html
