= A Profecia =

Studio album by Bonde da Stronda
- Released: 2 December 2011
- Recorded: 2010–2011
- Genres: Rap, hip hop, pop, rock
- Language: Portuguese
- Labels: Galerão Records , Radar Records
- Producers: Dennis DJ; Victor Júnior

Bonde da Stronda chronology
Nova Era da Stronda (2009)	A Profecia (2011)	Corporação (2012)

Singles from A Profecia
- 1. "A Profecia" Released: 8 December 2010; 2. "Tudo pra mim" Released: 8 February 2011; 3. "O Bagulho é muito Louco" Released: 30 April 2011

A Profecia (Portuguese for The Prophecy) is the second studio album by hip hop group Bonde da Stronda released in 2011 by the label "Galerão Records" and distributed by Radar Records. Were released as singles tracks "A Profecia", "Tudo pra mim" and "O Bagulho é muito Louco" in order to promote the album. The release date for the CD has been rescheduled several times until then be released on 2 December 2011.

== Track listing ==
All tracks are written by Mr. Thug with a little help of Léo Stronda.

No.	Title	Length
1.	"Intro"
2.	"É Nós Família"
3.	"Esbórnia e Alcool"
4.	"KingStar"
5.	"Paixão"
6.	"Minha da Cabeça aos Pés"
7.	"A Profecia"
8.	"Minha Voz, Minha Vida"
9.	"Garotas"
10.	"O Bagulho é muito Louco"
11.	"Fanfarrão"
12.	"Encaixe Perfeito"
13.	"Somos a Tropa"
14.	"Tudo pra mim"
15.	"Uzamigo"
16.	"Cashman"

== Personnel ==
- Mr. Thug – lead vocals, composition
- Léo Stronda – vocals

== Music videos ==
Year	Song	Info
2011	"Tudo pra Mim"	Release date: 8 February 2011; Featuring: Babí Hainni; Production: Galerão Filmes; Director(s): Ralph Richter/Tiago Cortezi
2011	"Esbórnia e Álcool"	Release date: 25 October 2011; Production: Galerão Filmes; Director(s): Tiago Cortezi
