= O Lado Certo da Vida Certa =

Studio album by Bonde da Stronda
- Released: 2013
- Recorded: 2013
- Label: Galerão Records
- Producer: Dennis Dj

Bonde da Stronda chronology
Feito pras Damas (2013)	O Lado Certo da Vida Certa (2013)

Singles from O Lado Certo da Vida Certa
- 1. "Eu Só Queria"

O Lado Certo da Vida Certa is the fifth studio album by Brazilian hip-hop group Bonde da Stronda. Production for the album took place following the release of their mixtape, Feito pras Damas in early 2013. The album was released on September 30, 2013.

== Background ==
Since early 2013, vocalist Mr. Thug had already announced a new album was underway following the 2013 release of their mixtape, Feito pras Damas. As of May, Mr. Thug and Léo Stronda have posting pictures on their social networking pages of them in the studio during the recording of the album and working on some new music.

On May 16, 2013, they posted one teaser of the song "Sozinha". In an interview with G1, Mr. Thug talks about the album, and mentions the names of some tracks like "Sozinha", "Na Atividade" and "Virtude", he also reveals that one of the tracks had the participation of MC Guimê. He also said that the song "Virtude" is a melodic hardcore that has the influence of Chorão. Bonde da Stronda had said a little bit about the new album to SRZD news. They said that, "The new album is a more mature work, but will not miss 'stronda'". Leo also talks during the interview to SRZD, that the group would be looking for a distributor to the market of the album, but also mentions that the album will be available for free digital download on their official website. On May 23 was released the second teaser of the album with the song featuring MC Guime, "Na Atividade".

On September 29, Galerão Records uploaded the entire album to their YouTube channel, one day before the album's official release. O Lado Certo da Vida Certa was released on September 30, 2013.

== Singles ==
On August 15, 2013, Bonde da Stronda released first single and music video, "Eu Só Queria", and had over 200 mil hits on YouTube during its first day and currently has more than 1 million hits. On October, the duo announces a new music video, "Na Atividade". The video told with special guest Natalie Nunn and McGuimê.

== Track listing ==
1. "Na Atividade" (feat. McGuimê)
2. "Dá Meu Copo"
3. "Sozinha"
4. "Eu Só Queria"
5. "Pureza É Pureza"
6. "Aprendi"
7. "Não Tenho Dom"
8. "Tá nos Seus Olhos"
9. "Para de Caô"
10. "Os Dias"
11. "Vivo a Lutar"
12. "Nós Somos a Stronda" (feat. Prexeca Bangers)
