= Mama Drama =

Mama Drama may refer to:

- Mama Drama (album), a 1998 album by Mia X
- Mama Drama (TV series), a reality television series
- "Mama Drama" (The Cleveland Show), an episode of the TV series The Cleveland Show
- Mama Drama (film), a 2020 Nigerian film
