= Mr. Thug =

Brazilian singer and rapper (born 1990)

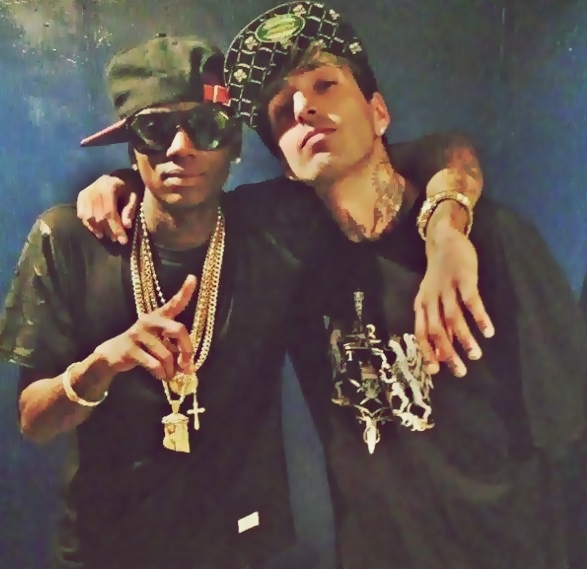
- Soujia Boy and Mr Thug

Background information
- Born: Diego Raphael Villanueva; 15 September 1990 (age 36); Rio de Janeiro, Brazil
- Genres: Hip hop, Trap, R&B
- Occupations: Singer, songwriter, rapper
- Instruments: Vocals, cavaquinho
- Years active: 2006–present
- Labels: Galerão Records, 2N Music, ZeroUM Records
- Formerly of: Bonde da Stronda

Diego Villanueva (Rio de Janeiro, September 15, 1990), better known by his stage name Mr. Thug, is a Brazilian singer-songwriter and rapper. He is the lead singer and co-founder of the group Bonde da Stronda.

== History ==
Diego Villanueva was born on September 15, 1990, in Rio de Janeiro. In 2006, along with Léo Schulz, he founded the group Bonde da Stronda. He is the main songwriter of the group. In their lyrics he portrays his life and that of his friends, talking about their daily reality and histories, usually about partying, girls, friends and his career.

On December 7, 2012, Diego released his single "Tem Espaço? Faz Tatuagem!" along with a music video. The song tells of his passion for tattoos.

He currently owns a record label called ZeroUM Records that continues to release solo works, with "Bonde da Stronda" and other artists.

== Personal life ==
Diego dated the singer Anitta between the years 2011 and 2012. The two posed for a photo session and planned to launch a music video together, which was canceled with their breakup in late 2012.

== Discography ==
=== Albums ===
Solo

- 2015 – SMOKE SWAG
- 2016 – THUGLUV
- 2017 – NOVEMBRO
- 2019 – SMOKE SWAG II
- 2020 – THUGLUV II
- 2022 - GERAÇÃO 90

with Bonde da Stronda

- 2008 - Stronda Style
- 2009 - Nova Era da Stronda
- 2011 - A Profecia
- 2012 - Corporação
- 2013 - Feito pras Damas
- 2013 - O Lado Certo da Vida Certa
- 2015 - GOLD
- 2017 - Principium
- 2020 - Praiana
- 2020 - Motorhead

=== Singles ===
Solo

- 2008 – "Verdadeira Vantagem" (feat. TonzA)
- 2008 – "S.T.R.O.N.D.A" (feat. TonzA & MC Lipy)
- 2009 – "Memorias"
- 2009 – "Ponto de Equilíbrio"
- 2012 – "Tem Espaço? Faz Tatuagem!"
- 2013 – "O Bem Que Eu Preciso"

=== Collaborations ===
- 2009 – Chaparraus Nutrs: "Alerta Brasil" (feat. Mr. Thug)
- 2010 – Diwali: "Melhor Assim" (feat. Mr. Thug)
- 2011 – TonzA: "Faço Tudo que Quiser" (feat. Mr. Thug)
- 2013 – Terra Preta: "O Bonde Segue" (feat. Mr. Thug)
- 2013 – Michael Puga [MP]: "Querem Tramar Meu Fim" (feat. Mr. Thug)
- 2013 – Hevo84: "Minha Pira" (feat. Mr. Thug)
- 2016 – Cyber: "Olha Ela" (feat. Mr. Thug, MC Tchesko e Don)
