= Bad Girls Club season 5 =

Bad Girls Club
- Season 5
- The original seven bad girls, from left to right, top to bottom: Erica, Danielle, Catya, Morgan, Brandi, Lea, and Kristen
- No. of episodes: 16

Release
- Original network: Oxygen
- Original release: August 3 – November 23, 2010

Season chronology
- ← Previous; Season 4 Next → Season 6

The fifth season of Bad Girls Club is titled Bad Girls Club: Miami and premiered on August 3, 2010, on Oxygen. This season moved filming from Los Angeles, California to Miami, Florida in an area on North Bay Road, between 41st and 64th streets, which filming began in March 2010. It premiered to 1.34 million viewers, making it the biggest premiere in Oxygen history to date.

== Production ==
Bad Girls Club: Miami was announced on January 21, 2010, while the fourth season was airing. Casting was announced at the same time with potential applicants submitting video tape submissions. Casting calls took place in Los Angeles, Atlanta, Buffalo, Oakland, Chicago, and Pittsburgh.

== House ==
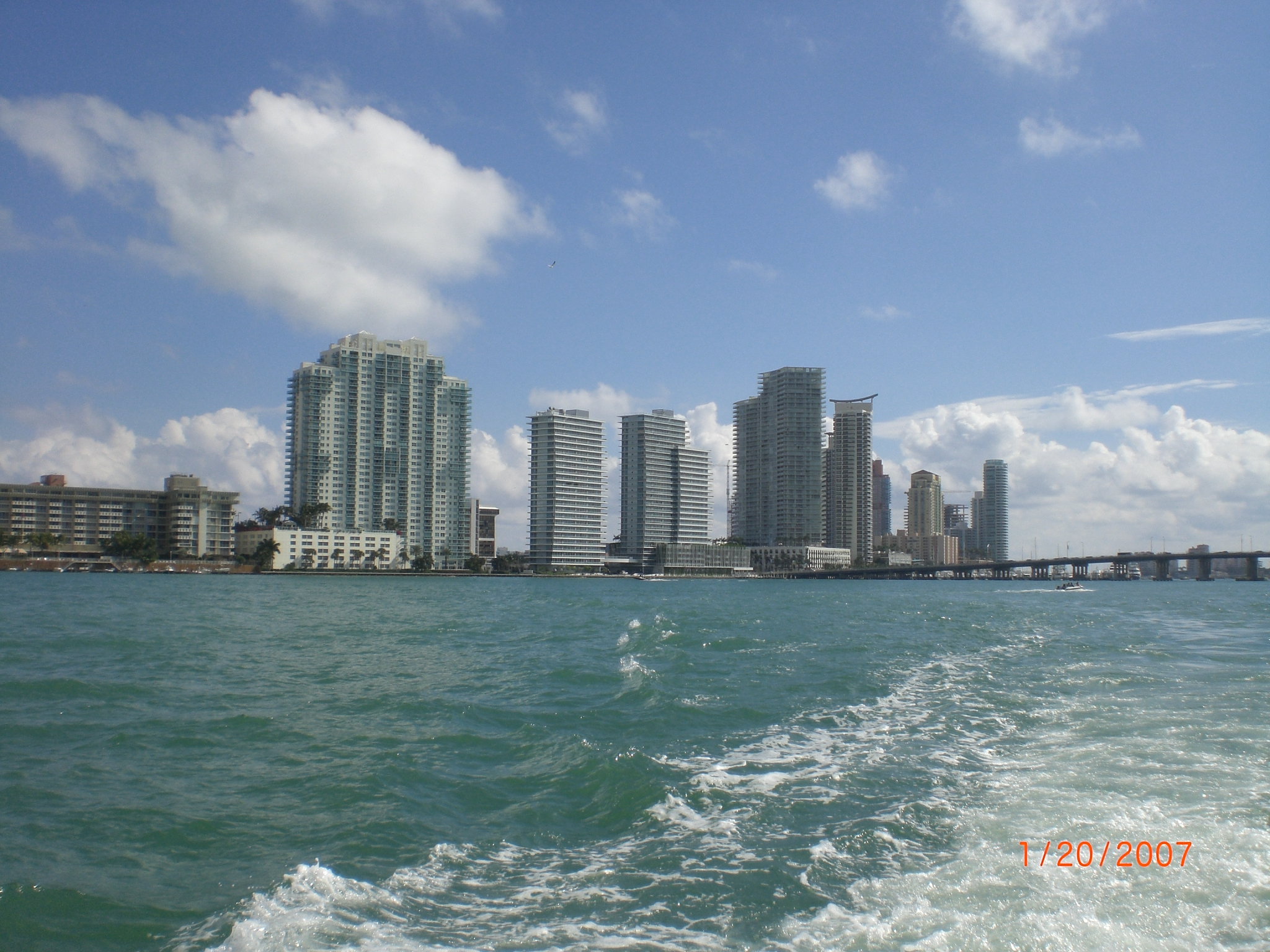
A southern portion of the South Beach skyline as seen from a boat on Biscayne Bay which the women from season 5 were during their three-month stay in the Bad Girls Club

As in previous seasons of the Bad Girls Club, the women live in a mansion that Oxygen provides for them for approximately three months while being filmed by producers who follow their every move. These women must try to navigate around each other's different personalities and lives. The mansion in season 5 was a two-story building with its own entrance, security fence, and parkway, on Biscayne Bay.

Inside the mansion's double doors, there is a small hallway in tropical colors, with red-painted walls, a green carpet, and small potted trees. At the end of the hallway there is a pet terrarium tank with a corn snake, given the name "Oliver" by the girls. Throughout the house, its decorating themes are bright summer colors, tropical colors, and Miami style. Since season 4, the producers have given the girls a chance to express themselves with given items. Season 5 girls were given replica mannequins of themselves and a wipe board and marker.

In the middle of the house, a large Hollywood-themed award adjacent to the stairs holds a ball that says "The World Is Hers". Unique furniture, such as the provided pool table, have Barbie-like dolls on it. The house pool has a small jacuzzi at its end similar to the one in season 4. The small pool beds feature girlie color, such as hot pink, finishes. On the second floor, the girls were given an ocean view beyond the pool outside. Their bedroom walls are painted red or light green. They were also given an exercise machine on the balcony, which became a smoking area for most of the girls. The modern-day kitchen tabletops were made of marble.

In every season of the Bad Girls Club, seven young women enter the mansion on the season premiere. During the show "replacements" enter the house after a girl departs for whatever reason.

== Cast ==
The season began with seven original bad girls. Two left voluntarily, two were removed by production, and one was kicked out by another cast member. Three replacement bad girls were introduced in their absences later in the season.

Name	Age (Note: Age at time of filming)	Hometown	Nickname	Replaced
Brandi "Venus" Arceneaux	26	Inglewood, California	The Sneaky Stripper	—N/a
Catya "Cat" Washington	24	Philadelphia, Pennsylvania	The Elite Player	—N/a
Danielle Rosario	21	Massapequa, New York	The Scrapper	—N/a
Erica Langston	25	Anaheim, California	The Trash Talking Cheerleader	—N/a
Kristen Guinane	23	Manchester-by-the-Sea, Massachusetts	The Pageant Princess	—N/a
Lea Beaulieu	22	South Beach, Florida	The South Beach Rebel	—N/a
Morgan Osman	21	Miami Beach, Florida	The Uber Bitch	—N/a
Kayleigh Severn	22	San Diego, California	The Kung Fu Diva	Morgan
Ashley Cheatham	21	Houston, Texas	The Southern Belle	Catya
Christina "Teeny" Hopkins	22	Richmondtown, New York	Agent Orange	Kayleigh

=== Duration of Cast ===
Bad Girl	Episodes												
Bad Girl	1	2	3	4	5	6	7	8	9	10	11	12	13
Erica	Featured												
Lea	Featured												
Kristen	Featured											removed (Note: Kristen was removed from the house by production after a physical altercation with Lea.)	Appeared (Note: Kristen and Morgan made an appearance.)
Brandi	Featured										Kicked (Note: Brandi was kicked out of the house by Kristen and Lea after starting a physical altercation with Lea and causing harm to Christina and Kristen.)		
Danielle	Featured							Left (Note: Danielle left the house voluntarily due to Kristen and Lea's actions.)					
Catya	Featured					Left (Note: Catya left the house voluntarily because she felt she was too "classy" to stay in the house any longer.)							
Morgan	Featured	removed (Note: Morgan was removed from the house by production for breaking into and destroying the production room after a physical altercation with Brandi, Danielle and Erica.)											Appeared
Kayleigh				Entered (Note: Kayleigh replaced Morgan.)	Featured		Left (Note: Kayleigh left the house voluntarily after multiple arguments with Kristen, Brandi and Lea.)						
Ashley								Entered (Note: Ashley and Christina replaced Catya and Kayleigh.)	Featured				
Christina								Entered	Featured				

== Episodes ==
No. overall	No. in season	Title	Original release date	Viewers (millions)
78	1	"Welcome to Miami Beyotch"	August 3, 2010	1.34
Seven brassy, sassy self-proclaimed bad girls arrive in Miami and try to live together under one roof for 3 months. One Bad Girl tries to show self dominance over prime and proper Kristen which shockingly backfires. Morgan's high class diva attitude starts to annoy some of the girl's in the house which makes her prime target for eviction which leads to a heated altercation ending in a cliffhanger.
79	2	"Check Your Baggage"	August 10, 2010	1.57
The episode continues with the explosive fight between Morgan, Brandi, Danielle and Erica continuing and Morgan isn't leaving without a fight. Production steps in and tries calming all the girls down and Morgan breaks into the production room and is ultimately sent packing. Lea's 23rd Birthday Bash leads to a club brawl when locals start attacking the girls. After a heated argument Kristen and Lea talk it out and start developing a friendship. Note: Morgan is removed from the house.
80	3	"Where's The Money Honey"	August 17, 2010	1.54
Erica separates herself from the group when the girls visit a tattoo parlour, leaving the rest of her roommates to wonder why she joined the club. Meanwhile, an unforgiving Catya gets revenge on Erica's fling Jeff after his bad attitude leaves her feeling wronged.
81	4	"Talkin' Smack"	August 24, 2010	1.47
Erica goes against the house when they hatch a plan to haze new girl Kayleigh. Danielle discloses information about a past heroin addiction, and is pushed to the limit when Brandi uses it against her. Note: Kayleigh replaces Morgan.
82	5	"Beach Blanket Bad Girls"	August 31, 2010	1.96
A friendship splinters due to Brandi's unreturned crush on Lea. Meanwhile, an argument at the beach results in nasty ripple effects, with Kayleigh's loyalty emerging as an issue.
83	6	"Jamaican Me Crazy"	September 14, 2010	1.94
Kristen sets her sights on Kayleigh after drama ensues on an exotic getaway in Negril, Jamaica. After a heated argument, Kristen decides to throw all of Kayleigh's clothes on the beach and break her camera. Kayleigh leaves, but goes back to the house in Miami. An unexpected exit leaves some of the roommates shocked and bewildered. Note: Catya is removed from the house.
84	7	"Threesome's A Crowd"	September 21, 2010	1.87
The girls are shocked to find out that Kayleigh is back at the house. Kayleigh hangs on tight as she fears her time in the house may be running out. Lea finds herself at the center of a sticky situation after her newfound alliance with one "bad girl" leads to problems with another. Note: Kayleigh voluntarily left the house.
85	8	"Departures and Arrivals"	September 28, 2010	1.72
Kristen and Lea prey on the vulnerability of one roommate, leading to another departure. Meanwhile, unforeseen company arrives which shakes the house. Notes: Ashley & Christina both replace Catya & Kayleigh. Danielle voluntarily left the house.
86	9	"Life's a Bleach"	October 5, 2010	1.77
Christina locks horns with mansion power players Lea and Kristen, leading to a messy dispute.
87	10	"Who Runs Miami?"	October 19, 2010	1.70
An alienated Christina takes a hiatus from house drama and finds solace in season 4 bad girl, Natalie Nunn. Brandi's failed attempt at being forgiven by Lea results in a meltdown which drives a further wedge in their relationship.
88	11	"Brandi On The Rocks"	October 26, 2010	1.54
When her wallet goes missing, a stormy Brandi runs amok and cuts a swath of destruction in her wake. Elsewhere, Kristen's resentment is at a high boil, courtesy of Lea. Note: Brandi is kicked out of the house.
89	12	"The Wicked Witch of Key West"	November 2, 2010	1.73
Brandi's parting words manifest into strong feelings of distrust between top dogs Lea and Kristen. A vacation to Key West has disastrous consequences, putting an end to Kristen's reign and cutting her journey short. Note: Kristen is removed from the house.
90	13	"Punching Out"	November 9, 2010	1.71
Ashley steps up to the plate as the house tires of Christina once and for all, leading to a fight which ends the season on a cliffhanger. Amidst the chaos, two erstwhile roomies make an uninvited return, leaving a parting gift that will go down in history. Note: Kristen & Morgan make an appearance.
91	14	"Reunion: Part 1"	November 16, 2010	2.07
The season 5 "bad girls" reunite for one last time to discuss their actions. Tensions reach a fever pitch between Christina and Ashley, and Kristen also comes under fire by several of the girls.
92	15	"Reunion: Part 2"	November 23, 2010	1.90
The conclusion of a reunion edition features the Miami roomies recalling the peaks and troughs of a whirlwind journey. Kristen is backed into a corner when Erica, Lea and Kayleigh join forces.
93	16	"BGC: Top 10 OMG's"	November 30, 2010	1.14
Bad Girls Alumni's Aimee Season 1 Tanisha Season 2 & Florina & Natalie Season 4 count down the 10 best moments from seasons 1 through 5 of Bad Girls Club.

== After the show ==
Catya Washington was arrested in November 2010, on various drug charges. She was arrested a second time in January 2011. She made several appearances on shows including Wild 'n Out as a hype-girl and as a background extra on television series Empire and Orange is the New Black.

Erica Langston released a sex-tape with Vivid Entertainment, with her then boyfriend whom she had met on the show. In 2012, she was a contestant on Playboy TV's dating show, Foursome. She was also involved in a feud with Bad Girls Club reunion host Perez Hilton.

Kristen Guinane made a brief appearance at the Bad Girls Club season 6 reunion. She began hosting a weekly show for Playboy Radio between 2012-2014. She worked as a regular panelist and eventually became the lead host for AfterBuzz TV: Bad Girls Club.

Lea Beaulieu competed and was the winner of the Bad Girls Club spin-off Love Games: Bad Girls Need Love Too season 2.

Morgan Osman became a main cast member on VH1's Mob Wives spin-off Miami Monkey in 2013. She was in a relationship with German fashion designer Philipp Plein between the years of 2017-2019. In 2023, she went viral after a verbal confrontation on an airplane.

Ashley Cheatham became a cast member on VH1's short lived reality series Mama Drama in 2012.

== Controversies ==
During the episode "The Wicked Witch of Key West", a stranger at a bar offered to buy drinks for cast members Kristen Guinane and Christina Hopkins. He spiked the drinks with PCP hallucinogenic pills, and Guinane became intoxicated. She claimed to have suffered bruises on her body when the man grabbed her and handled her roughly. Guinane reported that the show's producers did not want to identify the man on television for fear of a lawsuit. She blamed the drug for her hitting fellow cast member Lea Beaulieu in the face, leading to a fight.

In 2011, a video of cast member Christina Hopkins surfaced on the front page of TMZ of her calling fellow cast member Ashley Cheatham multiple racial slurs. The clip went viral online with Cheatham responding to Hopkins by telling her to kill herself. Oxygen network responded to the controversy with an official statement stating Hopkins would never appear on the network or any of their programming again.
