= Nova Era da Stronda =

Studio album by Bonde da Stronda
- Released: August 9, 2009
- Genre: Stronda music, hip hop, pop, funk carioca
- Language: Portuguese
- Label: Galerão
- Producer: Dennis DJ; Victor Júnior

Bonde da Stronda chronology
Stronda Style (2008)	Nova Era da Stronda (2009)	A Profecia (2011)

Nova Era da Stronda is the first studio album of the carioca group Bonde da Stronda released on August 9, 2009 by the label "Galerão Records". Already containing some of the old hits of the duo as "Nossa Quimica", "XXT" among others. On April 11, 2010 they released the video clip for the song "Playsson Raiz". Later, on September 18, 2010 they released a video clip for the song "Mansão Thug Stronda", and currently spends more than 35 million hits on YouTube.

== Track list ==
1. "Intro" - 1:18
2. "XXT" - 3:17
3. "Playsson Raiz" - 3:36
4. "Nossa Química" - 4:18
5. "Garota Diferente" - 3:11
6. "Mar Playsson" – 3:02
7. "Nova Era da Stronda" – 4:03
8. "Do Jeito que eu Quero" – 3:37
9. "O Ciclo" – 3:40
10. "Belo Par" – 3:58
11. "Romance" – 3:02
12. "Pra Ouvir No Seu Carro" – 4:44
13. "Eu Não sei Dizer" – 2:46
14. "Surf Girl" – 4:10
15. "Noite Insana" – 5:11
16. "Só Pros Verdadeiros" – 5:03
17. "Quando Você Menos Esperar" – 3:36
18. "Mansão Thug Stronda" – 6:09
19. "Come to The Floor" – 4:13
20. "Nossa Química"(Funk carioca version) – 4:44

== Video clips ==
1. Playsson Raiz
2. Mansão Thug Stronda
