= Florina Kaja =

American television personality and singer (born 1982)

- Born: September 1, 1982 (age 44); New York City, US
- Occupations: reality television star, activist, psychic medium
- Years active: 2009–present
- Television: Bad Girls Club season 4, Bad Girls All Star Battle
- Children: 1
- Relatives: Drita D'Avanzo (cousin)

Florina "Flo" Kaja (born September 1 1982) is an Albanian-American reality television star, activist and singer. She is best known for her appearance on the fourth season of the hit Oxygen network reality show Bad Girls Club. She also appeared on Bad Girls Club spin-off Bad Girls All Star Battle season 1, where she finished in second place.

== Early life ==
Born in Staten Island, New York, Kaja was the second child of an Albanian immigrant couple, Sakip Kaja and Safija. Her uncle, Verdi Kaja, who was shot three times by accused murderer Carmine Carini, was an Albanian gangster and was found deceased when Kaja was 8 years old.

Kaja attended Curtis High School until her second year and graduated from New Dorp High School in 2000.

== Television career ==
In 2009, Kaja starred in the fourth season of Oxygen Network's hit reality television show, Bad Girls Club. She was the third bisexual cast member in the show's history, and is an open advocate for the LGBTQ+ community. In the seventh episode, Kaja injured her ankle after a physical altercation with cast member Amber McWha. The altercation began when McWha stated she didn't believe in bisexuality and believed bisexual people were confused about their sexuality. Kaja confronted McWha on her homophobic comments, prompting McWha to push her in to the pool, which sprained Kaja's ankle. Kaja reacted by picking McWha up by her hair and throwing her across the floor.

McWha was then faced with the choice to send Kaja home for breaking the no violence rule, or to let her stay on the show, which McWha let her stay. Kaja voluntarily left the show in the tenth episode. She decided to leave as she believed none of her fellow cast members cared about her or respected her life choices. This episode, at the time of airing, became one of the most watched episodes of the Bad Girls Club, achieving 2.27 million viewers.

She appeared in the reunion special episodes, where she further explained she left so she would not physically harm any of her other cast members. During the reunion special Kaja got in to a physical altercation with cast member Natalie Nunn, She also famously called out reunion host Perez Hilton. Kaja responded to a criticism from Hilton stating "You know what, that's why you got punched in the face by Will.i.am cuz' you're a bitch!". Hilton retorted by claiming Kaja needed mental health help, in which Kaja replied with "You better believe it, Perez Hilton!". The clip of the argument between Hilton and Kaja went viral on TikTok in 2020.

She appeared in two episodes of The Tyra Banks Show alongside fellow Bad Girls Club season 4 cast members. She also co-hosted a Bad Girls Club special, Bad Girls Club Top 10 OMG Moments seasons 1–5, alongside season 1 cast member; Aimee Landi, season 2 cast member; Tanisha Thomas, season 3 cast member; Amber Meade and fellow season 4 cast member; Natalie Nunn.

In 2011, Kaja starred in the Bad Girls Club, two episode special, Bad Girls Club: Flo Gets Married. The show centered on Kaja's traditional Albanian wedding to her fiancée Patriot "Pat Coso" Kosovrasti and on her pregnancy. Kaja met Kosovrasti at a Staten Island nightclub and within months they decided to get married. Kosovrasti's mother Angie, sought out Kaja as the antithesis of a traditional Albanian housewife and disapproved of her "bad ways", claiming that Kaja was not the daughter-in-law that she wanted. The television special garnered 0.85 million viewers in total. In the special Kaja found out that she was pregnant. She gave birth to her first child, a girl named Elliana Kosovrasti on July 1, 2011. Kaja and Kosovrasti split shortly after the child's birth.

In 2012, Kaja landed a cameo role in horror film, Sinister. She also featured in Bad Girls Club special, Tanisha Gets Married. In 2014 she landed another small role in horror film, It Follows.

In 2013, Kaja starred in Bad Girls Club spin-off, Bad Girls All Star Battle season 1. The show was a reality challenge show where past "all star" cast members from Oxygen's Bad Girls Club compete for a cash prize of $100,000. Kaja made it to the final, where she finished in second place to Bad Girls Club season 10: Atlanta, cast member Jenniffer Hardwick. During the show, Kaja engaged in multiple feuds with multiple cast members, including Danielle "Danni" Victor, Gabrielle "Gabi" Victor, Jenniffer Hardwick, Julie Ofcharsky, Natalie Nunn and Raquel "Rocky" Santiago. Kaja got in to another physical altercation with former season 4 cast member, Natalie Nunn. Kaja appeared in the reunion specials and got in to a physical altercation with winning contestant Jenniffer Hardwick's sister, Jasmine Hardwick.

In 2020, in an interview with Justin Jay C, Kaja revealed she was asked to take part in Bad Girls Club season 13: Redemption. The season focused on past all star bad girls returning to redeem their bad behavior. Kaja turned down the show as she believed the pay was not good enough.

== Personal life ==
Kaja is openly bisexual. She is also a strong believer of Allah.

She has one daughter. As of 2025 they live together on the outskirts of New York. Kaja works as a psychic medium with a large Instagram and TikTok following and a small YouTube following, where she offers tarot card readings.

Kaja struggled with addiction issues previously, but has been clean since 2015. In 2013 she was arrested for using a friends ID to illegally obtain Percocets. Kaja was taken to Bergen County Jail where she posted $10,000 in bail and was released shortly after. In 2014, she was arrested for DWI and drug possession, after making an Illegal U-Turn. She was charged for possession of a controlled substance and DWI. She also had an outstanding warrant for harassment.

She is cousins with Mob Wives star, Drita D'Avanzo.

== Filmography ==
=== Film and television ===
Year	Title	Role	Notes
2009	Bad Girls Club season 4: L.A	Self; original cast member	13 episodes
2009	Straight from the Horses Mouth	Self; guest	Direct to video
2009	The Tyra Banks Show	Self; guest	2 episodes
2010	Bad Girls Club Top 10 OMG Moments 1–5	Self; co-host	TV special
2011	Bad Girls Club: Flo Gets Married	Self	TV special
2012	Sinister	Murder victim	
2012	Tanisha Gets Married	Self; bridesmaid	TV special
2013	Bad Girls All Star Battle season 1	Self; contestant	2nd place, 11 episodes
2014	It Follows	Amber	
2021	Life of Mayhem	Self; guest	1 episode

== Discography ==
Year	Title	Notes
2010	Tear It Up (feat. Kofi Black)	Debut single
2010	Wanda's Way	
2011	Alpha Females (feat. Maya Greene)	
