= Bad Girls All-Star Battle season 1 =

Bad Girls All-Star Battle
- Season 1
- The cast of Bad Girls All-Star Battle. Top: Erika, Amber, Nastasia, Jennifer, Paula Middle: Natalie, Florina, Judi, Mehgan, Shannon, Julie, Raquel Bottom: Danielle, Gabrielle
- No. of episodes: 11

Release
- Original network: Oxygen
- Original release: May 21 – July 30, 2013

Season chronology
- Next → Season 2

The first season of Bad Girls All-Star Battle premiered on May 21, 2013, with Ray J as the host. It was deemed a success for Oxygen raking in a record-breaking 1.73 million viewers during its premiere, making history as the highest-rated series debut for the network. Filming for the season began in March 2013.

== Format ==
In the beginning of the season, each girl is selected for a team chosen by the "fan favorite" chosen by viewers, Julie for the Pink Team and Mehgan for the Purple Team, who then select their teammates. The first half of the season featured two main challenges. The Captain's Challenge is an individual competition. The winner becomes immune from elimination and the Team Captain for either the Pink or the Purple Team. The teams compete against each other in the Team Challenge. The losing team must nominate two girls from their team for elimination.

The second half of the season disbanded the teams. It became an individual competition, with the girls competing in Battle Challenges. The winner is safe as the rest of the girls vote for who is up for elimination. The final three competitors compete in the final challenge. Whoever finishes first wins the grand prize of $100,000.

== Contestants ==
Bad Girl	Age	Original season	Team	Outcome
Jenniffer "Jenn" Hardwick	22	Season 10: Atlanta	Purple	Winner
Florina "Flo" Kaja	30	Season 4: Los Angeles	Pink	Runner-up
Danielle "Danni" Victor	24	Season 8: Las Vegas	Purple	3rd place
Gabrielle "Gabi" Victor	24	Season 8: Las Vegas	Pink	4th place
Natalie Nunn	28	Season 4: Los Angeles	Purple	5th place
Judith "Judi" Jackson	23	Season 7: New Orleans	Pink	6th place
Julie Ofcharsky	24	Season 9: Mexico	Pink	7th place
Erika Jordan	24	Season 9: Mexico	Purple	8th Place (Note: Erika withdrew from the competition in Episode 5 due to a knee injury.)
Paula Hellens	26	Season 10: Atlanta	Pink	9th place (Note: Episode 4 ended in a cliffhanger with Paula's elimination occurring at the beginning of Episode 5.)
Amber Meade	29	Season 3: Los Angeles	Pink	10th place
Nastasia "Stasi" Townsend	25	Season 7: New Orleans	Purple	11th place
Mehgan James	22	Season 9: Mexico	Purple	12th place
Shannon Sarich	27	Season 10: Atlanta	Pink	13th Place (Note: Shannon and Rocky quit the competition during the elimination during Episode 1 due to Rocky's father's death.)
Raquel "Rocky" Santiago	22	Season 10: Atlanta	Purple	13th Place

== Contestant progress ==
Contestant	Episode								
Contestant	1	2	3	4	5	6	7	8	
Jenn	SAFE	SAFE	WIN	WIN	SAFE	SAFE	WIN	NOM	WINNER
Flo	WIN	SAFE	WIN	NOM	WIN	WIN	SAFE	WIN	SECOND
Danni	SAFE	NOM	SAFE	SAFE	SAFE	SAFE	NOM	NOM	THIRD
Gabi	SAFE	SAFE	SAFE	WIN	NOM	NOM	SAFE	ELIM	
Natalie	NOM	WIN	SAFE	SAFE	SAFE	SAFE	ELIM	SAFE	
Judi	SAFE	SAFE	SAFE	SAFE	SAFE	ELIM			
Julie	SAFE	SAFE	SAFE	SAFE	ELIM				
Erika	SAFE	SAFE	SAFE	SAFE	WDR				
Paula	SAFE	WIN	NOM	ELIM					
Amber	SAFE	SAFE	ELIM						
Stasi	SAFE	ELIM							
Mehgan	ELIM								
Shannon	QUIT								
Rocky	QUIT								

=== Notes ===
The contestant won the competition.
The contestant came in 2nd place.
The contestant was eliminated by coming in last in the First Round of a 2 Round Competition.
The contestant was a part of the winning team, and was exempt from elimination.
The contestant won the Bad Girls All Star Battle Challenge.
The contestant won both the Captain's Challenge and the Team's Challenge.
The contestant won the Captain's Challenge, but lost the Team's Challenge.
The contestant lost the Team's Challenge or Bad Girls All Star Battle Challenge, but was not put up for elimination.
The contestant was nominated for elimination and was in the bottom two or bottom three.
The contestant was eliminated from the competition.
The contestant was medically withdrawn from the competition due to injury.
The contestant won the Team's challenge but quit the competition.
The contestant won the Captain's Challenge but quit the competition.

== Voting history ==
	Episode 1	Episode 2	Episode 3	Episode 4	Episode 5	Episode 6	Episode 7	Episode 8		
	Episode 1	Episode 2	Episode 3	Episode 4	Episode 5	Episode 6	Episode 7	Elimination		Finale
Challenge Winner(s)	Pink Team	Pink Team	Purple Team	Purple Team	Flo	Flo	Jenn	Flo		Jenn
Team Captains	Flo; Rocky	Natalie; Paula	Jenn; Flo	Gabi; Jenn	—N/a					
Elimination Nominees	Mehgan; Natalie	Danni; Stasi	Amber; Paula	Flo; Paula	Gabi; Julie	Gabi; Judi	Danni; Natalie	Danni, Gabi, Jenn		—N/a
Jenn	Lost Team; Challenge	Lost Team; Challenge	Amber	Flo	Julie	Judi	Natalie	Gabi		WINNER
Flo	Mehgan	Nastasia	Losing Team; Captain	Nominated	Julie	Judi	Danni	Gabi	Gabi	RUNNER-UP
Danni	Lost Team; Challenge	Nominated	Amber	Paula	Julie	Judi	Nominated	Jenn		THIRD
Gabi	Mehgan	Nastasia	Lost Team; Challenge	Losing Team; Captain	Nominated	Nominated	Natalie	Jenn		Out (Episode 8)
Natalie	Nominated	Losing Team; Captain	Paula	Paula	Julie	Judi	Eliminated	Out (Episode 7)		
Judi	Mehgan	Nastasia	Lost Team; Challenge	Lost Team; Challenge	Julie	Eliminated	Out (Episode 6)			
Julie	Mehgan	Nastasia	Lost Team; Challenge	Lost Team; Challenge	Eliminated	Out (Episode 5)				
Erika	Lost Team; Challenge	Lost Team; Challenge	Amber	Paula	Withdrawn	Quit (Episode 5)				
Paula	Natalie	Nastasia	Nominated	Eliminated	Out (Episode 4)					
Amber	Natalie	Danni	Eliminated	Out (Episode 3)						
Stasi	Lost Team; Challenge	Eliminated	Out (Episode 2)							
Mehgan	Eliminated	Out (Episode 1)								
Rocky	Quit	Quit (Episode 1)								
Shannon	Quit	Quit (Episode 1)								
Withdrew	Shannon, Rocky	—N/a			Erika	—N/a				
Eliminated	Mehgan; 4 of 6 votes to eliminate	Nastasia; 5 of 6 votes to eliminate	Amber; 3 of 4 votes to eliminate	Paula; 3 of 4 votes to eliminate	Julie; 5 of 5 votes to eliminate	Judi; 4 of 4 votes to eliminate	Natalie; 2 of 3 votes to eliminate	Gabi; 3 of 5 votes to eliminate		Danielle; Third
Eliminated	Mehgan; 4 of 6 votes to eliminate	Nastasia; 5 of 6 votes to eliminate	Amber; 3 of 4 votes to eliminate	Paula; 3 of 4 votes to eliminate	Julie; 5 of 5 votes to eliminate	Judi; 4 of 4 votes to eliminate	Natalie; 2 of 3 votes to eliminate	Gabi; 3 of 5 votes to eliminate		Florina; Runner-Up
Eliminated	Mehgan; 4 of 6 votes to eliminate	Nastasia; 5 of 6 votes to eliminate	Amber; 3 of 4 votes to eliminate	Paula; 3 of 4 votes to eliminate	Julie; 5 of 5 votes to eliminate	Judi; 4 of 4 votes to eliminate	Natalie; 2 of 3 votes to eliminate	Gabi; 3 of 5 votes to eliminate		Jennifer; Winner

=== Notes ===
The contestant won the competition.
The contestant came in 2nd place.
The contestant was eliminated by coming in last in the First Round of a 2 Round Competition.
The contestant won the Team's Challenge.
The contestant won the Bad Girls All Star Battle Challenge.
The contestant won both the Captain's Challenge and the Team's Challenge.
The contestant won the Captain's Challenge, but lost the Team's Challenge.
The contestant lost the Bad Girls All Star Battle Challenge, but was not put up for elimination.
The contestant was nominated for elimination and was in the bottom two or bottom three.
The contestant was eliminated from the competition.
The contestant withdrew from the competition due to injury.
The contestant won the Team's Challenge, but quit the competition.
The contestant won the Captain's Challenge, but quit the competition.

== Episodes ==
No.	Title	Original release date	US viewers (millions)
1	"Keep Your Friends Close and Your Enemies Closer"	May 21, 2013	1.73
14 Bad Girls come together to battle for $100,000. Tempers flare at elimination, leading to 3 Bad Girls making their exit from the competition.
2	"A Snake in the Maze"	May 28, 2013	1.11
The events of the previous elimination causes a rift among the girls. Strategies are tested as the girls take on a challenge completely in a maze. Erika and Stasi’s friendship begins to crumble. Meanwhile, Natalie's manipulative ways lead to another physical showdown at elimination.
3	"Secrets and Lies"	June 4, 2013	0.82
Natalie, Flo and Amber form an early alliance, while squealing pigs and Velcro are the focal point of this week's challenge. Friendships between teammates quickly crumble after ugly truths are revealed.
4	"Hang Tough"	June 11, 2013	1.00
Flo and Jennifer go head to head both on and off the battlefield. Meanwhile, Flo and Natalie attempt to turn Judi against her alliance with The Twins and Julie.
5	"Pink and Purple Make Camo!"	June 12, 2013	1.67
The previous elimination completes itself when Paula is eliminated. Teams are split and contestants compete solo for the cash prize leading Judi to question who her true allies are. Meanwhile, one Bad Girl is forced to leave the competition due to an injury.
6	"Breakfast in Bed"	June 25, 2013	0.91
This week's challenge involves breakfast cereal, 40 pounds of luggage and a puzzle. Flo turns to her faith when a difficult situation is put on her. Judi's drunken antics quickly turns the house against her.
7	"The Ultimate Cat Fight"	July 2, 2013	1.00
The remaining ladies square-off in a Gladiator battle. The season long rivalry between Flo and Jennifer finally reaches its boiling point. Realizing a little too late that Flo asked Jennifer to do her dirty work, Natalie is eliminated.
8	"Good Things Come to Those Who Wait"	July 9, 2013	1.83
The final four are put to the ultimate test and a shocking elimination catches the girls off guard. Flo’s bad decision of keeping Jenn cost her as the winner of the Bad Girls All-Star Battle is determined.
9	"Reunion: Part 1"	July 16, 2013	1.43
The cast reunites to settle old business once and for all. Jennifer reveals a shocking secret. Flo and Jennifer re-ignite their feud which leads to a shocking altercation.
10	"Reunion: Part 2"	July 23, 2013	1.72
While some Bad Girls make their peace with the drama that unfolded during the season, others are not in such a hurry to forgive and forget. Make-ups, breakups, trash talking and fist throwing all ensue bringing the first season of Bad Girls All-Star Battle to an explosive close.
11	"Twinstant Replay"	July 30, 2013	0.93
The Victor Twins take a look back on the most outrageous moments of the season. Natalie Nunn also gives her insight on the season. Fellow Bad Girls Judi, Mehgan James, Julie, Amber and Florina “Flo Kaja all make video call appearances to give their opinion of the drama that unfolded during the season. The Twins reveal a shocking secret.
