= Tanisha Gets Married =

American television series

- Clive Muir and Tanisha Thomas
- Genre: Documentary
- Starring: Tanisha Thomas
- Country of origin: United States
- No. of seasons: 1
- No. of episodes: 8

Production
- Executive producers: Joel Zimmer; SallyAnn Salsano
- Running time: 40 to 43 minutes (excluding commercials)
- Production company: 495 Productions

Original release
- Network: Oxygen
- Release: May 7 – July 2, 2012

Tanisha Gets Married is an American reality documentary television series that premiered on May 7, 2012 on Oxygen. The eight-part wedding special featured Bad Girls Club cast member Tanisha Thomas and her husband as they prepare for their wedding ceremony.

== Premise ==
The series follows Bad Girls Club season-two cast member Tanisha Thomas as she prepares for her wedding. With preparations for the wedding in order, tensions rise between Tanisha and her soon-to-be husband Clive. Other former "Bad Girls" cast members make several appearances on the show. The series also focuses on tensions between Natalie and Florina, and how their actions could have ruined Tanisha's big day.

== Cast ==
- Tanisha Thomas, the bride
- Clive Muir, the groom
- Lydia Thomas, Tanisha's mother
- Arkeen McGuire, maid of honor and cousin
- Florina Kaja, bridesmaid and former Bad Girl, season 4
- Natalie Nunn, bridesmaid and former Bad Girl, season 4
- Amber Meade, bridesmaid and former Bad Girl, season 3
- Wilmarie Sena, former Bad Girl, season 6

== Episodes ==
No.	Title	Original release date
1	"Countdown to a Wedding Throwdown"	May 7, 2012
The couple interviews wedding planners while scouting for venues.
2	"Can You Hear Me Now?"	May 14, 2012
Tanisha deals with Clive's hearing issues, but the drama gets noisy when his Internet secrets are discovered.
3	"You're Asking for a Fight"	May 21, 2012
Tanisha reaches out to a lawyer to draft a prenuptial agreement after discovering Clive on a dating website. Flo and Natalie butt heads at the bridal shower.
4	"Bad Girls Never Change"	June 4, 2012
The bridal shower turns chaotic. Elsewhere, a dispute between Tanisha and Clive explodes into a battle royal that could alter their relationship for good.
5	"You Say He's Just a Friend"	June 11, 2012
Clive grows jealous of Tanisha's best friend, leading to a tense cake-tasting appointment and a testy therapy session.
6	"Atlantic City Showdown"	June 18, 2012
Joint bachelor and bachelorette parties are held in Atlantic City, but Clive's jealousy issues continue to test his relationship with Tanisha.
7	"The Good, the Bad Girl and the Ugly"	June 25, 2012
The drama between Natalie and Flo in Atlantic City becomes violent leading to one of Tanisha's friends to get hurt. Meanwhile, Clive sours when the ladies ruin his bachelor party, and a monumental secret is disclosed to Tanisha.
8	"Possibly Ever After"	July 2, 2012
Emotions reach the breaking point when doubts continue to surround Tanisha's nuptials.
