= Irv Constantine =

American football player (1907–1966)

Profile
- Position: Halfback

Personal information
- Born: January 18, 1907; New York, New York, U.S.
- Died: May 14, 1966 (aged 59); New Hyde Park, New York, U.S.
- Listed height: 5 ft 9 in (1.75 m)
- Listed weight: 200 lb (91 kg)

Career information
- High school: Curtis (Staten Island, New York)
- College: Syracuse

Career history
- Staten Island Stapletons (1931)
- Stats at Pro Football Reference

C. Irving Constantine (January 18, 1907 – May 14, 1966) was an American professional football halfback who played one season with the Staten Island Stapletons of the National Football League (NFL). He played college football at Syracuse University.

== Early life ==
Constantine, a Jew, was born in New York City. He attended Curtis High School in Staten Island, New York.

== College career ==
Constantine played for the Syracuse Orange from 1928 to 1930. On September 28, 1929, he played in the first night game in the East as Syracuse beat Hobart College by a score of 77–0. He scored three touchdowns in 1929, then broke his shoulder midway through the 1930 season, ending his college career.

== Professional career ==
Constantine played in one game for the Staten Island Stapletons in 1931.

== See also ==
- List of Jews in sports#American football
