= Shemiah LeGrande =

American football player (born 1986)

Profile
- Position: Defensive tackle

Personal information
- Born: September 16, 1986 (age 40); Staten Island, New York, U.S.
- Listed height: 6 ft 0 in (1.83 m)
- Listed weight: 290 lb (132 kg)

Career information
- High school: Curtis (Staten Island)
- College: Hofstra
- NFL draft: 2008: undrafted

Career history
- Detroit Lions (2008); Arizona Cardinals (2009)*; Bloomington Extreme (2010); Hartford Colonials (2010)*
- * Offseason or practice squad member only

Shemiah LeGrande (born September 16, 1986) is an American former football defensive tackle. He was signed as an undrafted free agent by the Detroit Lions in 2008. He played college football at Hofstra.

He was also a member of the Arizona Cardinals, Bloomington Extreme and Hartford Colonials.

== Professional career ==
=== Detroit Lions ===
On May 29, the Detroit Lions signed Shemiah LeGrande as an undrafted free agent. On June 24, he was placed on injured reserve.

=== Arizona Cardinals ===
In 2009, LeGrande spent training camp with the Arizona Cardinals. He was cut before the regular season started.

=== Bloomington Extreme ===
On December 1, 2009, the Bloomington Extreme announced that they had signed LeGrande for the 2010 season.
