= Orlando Brown =

Orlando Brown may refer to:

- Orlando Brown (Kentucky politician) (1801–1867), American newspaper editor, historian and politician
- Orlando Brown (Wisconsin politician) (1828–1910), American farmer and legislator
- Orlando Brown (American football, born 1970) (1970–2011), American football player
- Orlando Brown (American football, born 1996), American football player, son of the above
- Orlando Brown (actor) (born 1987), American actor and rapper
