= Bad Girls All-Star Battle =

American reality television series

- Genre: Reality competition
- Presented by: Ray J
- Country of origin: United States
- Original language: English
- No. of seasons: 2
- No. of episodes: 23

Production
- Executive producers: Sam Berns; Erin Cristall; Rick de Oliveira; Gil Goldschein; Zach Kozeck; Jonathan Murray
- Running time: 40 to 44 minutes
- Production company: Bunim/Murray Productions

Original release
- Network: Oxygen
- Release: May 21, 2013 – April 1, 2014

Bad Girls All-Star Battle is a reality competition series that aired on Oxygen, and is the fourth spin-off of Bad Girls Club. It is the Bad Girls Club version of MTV's The Challenge. It premiered on May 21, 2013, with Ray J as the host.

== Series overview ==
Season	Episodes	Originally released		Winner	Runner-up	Third Place
Season	Episodes	First released	Last released	Winner	Runner-up	Third Place
1	11	May 21, 2013	July 30, 2013	Jenniffer Hardwick	Florina Kaja	Danielle 'Danni' Victor
2	12	January 7, 2014	April 1, 2014	Tiana Small	Sarah Oliver	Mehgan James

== Format ==
Alumni from previous seasons of Bad Girls Club battle for a grand prize of $100,000. It takes place in a mansion located in Los Angeles. A group of bad girls are separated into two teams and compete in two competitions. In the Captain's Challenge, the winner will be Captain of the team and will be safe for the week. In the Team's Challenge, both teams compete and the winning team will be safe for the week.

The losing team has to put up two girls for elimination. Halfway through the season, the teams are dissolved. The remaining contestants compete in the Battle Challenge, where the battle challenge winner will be safe for the last few weeks. In the season finale, there is a final challenge, where the final three are put to the ultimate test to win the prize and title.

In season 1, fourteen bad girls competed for the grand prize and title of "The Baddest Bad Girl of All Time." Production began in March 2013.

Introduced in season 2, sixteen bad girls competed through enhanced challenges, which were more extreme than last season. This season, four of the girls returned from last season. The winner won the prize and title of "The Baddest Bad Girl on the Planet." Production began in September 2013.
