= Hair Battle Spectacular =

- Genre: Reality competition
- Presented by: Brooke Burns (Season 1); Eva Marcille (Season 2)
- Judges: Derek J; Taylor Jacobson
- Country of origin: United States
- Original language: English
- No. of seasons: 2
- No. of episodes: 16

Production
- Executive producers: J.D. Roth; Todd A. Nelson
- Running time: 42 minutes
- Production company: 3 Ball Productions

Original release
- Network: Oxygen
- Release: August 10, 2010 – October 3, 2011

Hair Battle Spectacular is an American reality competition series that aired on Oxygen from August 10, 2010, to October 3, 2011. The series features ten hair stylists as they compete for a $100,000 grand prize and to see who can create the most outrageous hair styles that resemble everything from multilayer wedding cakes to toys with movable pieces.

== Cast ==
- Brooke Burns, Host — Season 1
- Eva Marcille, Host — Season 2
- Derek J, Judge — Hair designer
- Taylor Jacobson, Judge — Stylist

== Season 1 ==
=== Eliminated ===
- Josh 'Roo' Wixom – Hometown: Las Vegas, Nevada
- Keleigh 'Malibu' Laier – Hometown: Laguna Niguel, California (Left for medical reasons)
- Bryson 'Boss' Conley – Hometown: Los Angeles, California
- Tara 'Cajmonet' Merritt – Hometown: Woodland Hills, California
- Jerome 'J-Rok' Allen – Hometown: Atlanta, Georgia
- Valerie 'Valley Girl' St. George – Hometown: Burbank, California
- Sexi Lexi Hopper — Hometown: Denver, Colorado
- Moira 'Fingaz' Frazier – Hometown: Toledo, Ohio
- Nate 'Tsunami' Siam – Hometown: Modesto, California (Runner-up)

=== Winner ===
- Jasmaine 'Minista' Jazz – Hometown: Brooklyn, New York

=== Progress ===
Check-up from the Neck-up; Winner	Fingaz	J-Rok	Minista	Minista	Fingaz	Fingaz	Tsunami	None
Episodes
Stylist	1	2	3	4	5	6	7	8
Minista	HIGH^{1}	HIGH^{4}	HIGH^{4}	HIGH^{3}	HIGH^{1}	BTM2^{2}	BTM2^{1}	WINNER
Tsunami	LOW^{4}	HIGH^{3}	WIN^{2}	HIGH^{2}	BTM2^{1}	WIN^{1}	WIN^{2}	RUNNER UP
Fingaz	LOW^{5}	WIN^{1}	LOW^{3}	BTM2^{3}	WIN^{3}	BTM2^{1}	HIGH^{1}	ELIM
Sexi Lexi	BTM2^{1}	BTM2^{2}	HIGH^{3}	WIN^{1}	HIGH^{2}	HIGH^{2}	ELIM^{2}	
Valley Girl	LOW^{3}	LOW^{3}	BTM2^{1}	LOW^{1}	ELIM^{2}			
J-Rok	HIGH^{2}	HIGH^{2}	HIGH^{1}	ELIM^{2}				
Cajmonet	HIGH^{4}	LOW^{1}	ELIM^{2}					
Boss	HIGH^{3}	ELIM^{4}						
Malibu	WIN^{5}	LEFT						
Roo	ELIM^{2}							

- ^{12345} Two contestants with the same numbers indicates that they faced off in a battle that week.

The contestant withdrew from the competition due to medical reasons.
The contestant lost their hair battle, was a "Hair Don't", and was eliminated from the competition.
The contestant lost their hair battle and was a "Hair Don't".
The contestant lost their hair battle and was a "Hair Don't" and was also in the bottom 2.
The contestant won their hair battle and was a "Hair Do" but did not win the challenge.
The contestant won their hair battle and was a "Hair Do" and won the challenge.
The contestant won Hair Battle Spectacular.

== Season 2 ==
=== Eliminated ===
- Dnise "Bronx" Brown – Hometown: Bronx, New York
- Kristin "Dimples" Jackson – Hometown: Brooklyn, New York
- Spencer "Camouflage" Lebowitz – Hometown: Redondo Beach, California
- Gabriel "GQ" Quiñones -Hometown: La Puente, California
- Brenda "MzH20" Waters – Hometown: Atlanta, Georgia
- Tyler "Atomic" True – Hometown: Los Angeles, California
- Bethany "Queen B" Bell — Hometown: Los Angeles, California
- Jeanine "J9" Calia — Hometown: Providence, Rhode Island
- Alessandro "Bossa Nova" Voce – Hometown: Beverly Hills, California
- Ashley "Blondie" Stone — Hometown: Newington, Connecticut

=== Winner ===
- Kirby "Nostradamus" Keomysay — Hometown: Omaha, Nebraska

=== Progress ===
Check-up from the Neck-up; Winner	Bossa; Nova	Nostra- damus	J9	MzH2O	J9	Nostra- damus	Nostra- damus	None
Episodes
Stylist	1	2	3	4	5	6	7	8
Nostradamus	HIGH^{1}	HIGH^{5}	HIGH^{1}	WIN^{2}	HIGH^{1}	WIN^{3}	HIGH^{2}	WINNER^{1}
Blondie	WIN^{6}	LOW^{4}	LOW^{1}	LOW^{2}	HIGH^{3}	HIGH^{2}	LOW^{1}	OUT^{1}
Bossa Nova	HIGH^{4}	LOW^{5}	LOW^{2}	LOW^{1}	LOW^{2}	LOW^{1}	WIN^{1}	OUT^{1}
J9	LOW^{6}	WIN^{2}	HIGH^{3}	HIGH^{1}	LOW^{1}	HIGH^{1}	OUT^{2}	
Queen B	HIGH^{5}	HIGH^{4}	WIN^{2}	HIGH^{2}	WIN^{2}	OUT^{2}		
Atomic	HIGH^{3}	LOW^{2}	HIGH^{4}	HIGH^{1}	OUT^{3}			
MzH20	LOW^{5}	HIGH^{1}	LOW^{3}	OUT^{2}				
GQ	LOW^{1}	LOW^{1}	LOW^{4}	OUT^{1}				
Camouflage	LOW^{3}	HIGH^{3}	OUT^{4}					
Dimples	HIGH^{2}	OUT^{3}						
Bronx	OUT^{2}							

- ^{12345} Two contestants with the same numbers indicates that they faced off in a battle that week.

The contestant withdrew from the competition due to medical reasons.
The contestant lost their hair battle, was a "Hair Don't", and was eliminated from the competition.
The contestant lost their hair battle and was a "Hair Don't".
The contestant lost their hair battle and was a "Hair Don't" and was also in the bottom 2.
The contestant won their hair battle and was a "Hair Do" but did not win the challenge.
The contestant won their hair battle and was a "Hair Do" and won the challenge.
The contestant won Hair Battle Spectacular.
