= Bonde da Stronda =

Brazilian hip hop group

- Also known as: BDS
- Origin: Rio de Janeiro
- Genres: Stronda; hip hop; pop; funk carioca; rap rock
- Years active: 2006–2023
- Labels: Galerão
- Past members: Mr. Thug; Léo Stronda; MC Night; MC Cot
- Website: www.bondedastronda.net

Bonde da Stronda (also known as BDS) was a Brazilian hip hop group formed in 2006 in Rio de Janeiro, Brazil, by brazilian singers Mr. Thug and Léo Stronda. The group has recorded four studio albums and one independent album.

== History ==
=== Formation (2006–2008) ===
The group started in November 2006 and was formed by Mr. Thug (Diego Raphael Villanueva), Léo Stronda (Leonardo Schulz Cardoso), Mc Cot (Marcus Vinicius Mello) and Mc Night (Patrick Baptista Lopess). It all started when Leo decided to show Thug lyrics for a song he had at home called "Vida de Playsson" and called him to record just to show to friends. They started with home recordings and other music international bases. With the independent release of the songs on the internet, were recognized by the media. In 2007 Mc Cot decided to leave the group. In 2008 they released their first independent album called "Stronda Style". After this, Mc Night decided to leave the group, and remained only Thug and Léo.

=== Nova Era da Stronda and record deal (2009–2010) ===
In 2009 they did a remake of the 1980s song "Tic Tic Nervoso" by Kid Vinil, and was on the soundtrack of the 2010 season of Malhação telenovela (Malhação ID) aired by Rede Globo, they also released a music video of the song, it was the first official video of the group. In 2009 they signed with Galerão Records and on August 9, 2009 they released the virtual album Nova Era da Stronda rewriting some old hits and also with the participation of Mr. Catra on the song "Mansão Thug Stronda", of Tathi Kiss on "Belo Par" and Diwali on "Quando você menos Esperar", the songs now launched with bases own doing work more professional. In 2010 they recorded the single "Hell de Janeiro" with Leleco22 also launching a video clip of the song. Soon after they recorded another single "Você é um vicio" with DH of the band Cine. On April 11, 2010 they released a music video for the song "Playsson Raiz". The music video for the song "Mansão Thug Stronda" was released on September 18, 2010, and has over 110 million hits on YouTube.

=== A Profecia and new projects (2011–2013) ===
Bonde da Stronda released in 2011 his second studio álbum A Profecia bringing more style of the group, and with the participation of Mr. Catra in "Kingstar" and of Babi Hainni in "Tudo Pra Mim". Also in 2011 recorded two singles, "Faço Tudo Que Quizer" with Tonza, and also "Sangue Bom" with MC Marechal. On July 4, 2012 released their new work, the mixtape named "Corporação", with the participation of Dudu Nobre, MP, Pollo and Alandin. The music video for the song "Tem que Respeitar" with Dudu Nobre was launched on July 13, 2012. The music that has a great mix of hip hop with samba. On October 4, 2012 were completed recording the music video for "Zika do Bagui", with the participation of Pollo, and thus having its launch.

Bonde da Stronda started a project with two singles that each member sings about his hobby. In this first, Thug tells his addiction and passion for tattoos with the single "Tem Espaço? Faz Tatuagem!", released on December 7 along with a music video. The second single "Bonde da Maromba" is the time of Leo talk about his dedication and passion for fitness workout, along with the clip's debut occurred on December 17.

The album "Feito pras Damas" has been announced for release in November 2012, but the recordings were delayed due to the project of two singles of the hobbies of Thug and Léo. The album was officially released on January 18, 2013 for free digital download. Soon afterwards, Bonde da Stronda released the music video for "Swing do Bonde" on March 15, 2013, recorded at Barra da Tijuca in February. On June 9, 2013, Bonde da Stronda released the music video for "Das Antigas".

=== O Lado Certo da Vida Certa (2013–present) ===
On May 8, 2013, Bonde da Stronda announced a new album, O Lado Certo da Vida Certa. On August 15, 2013 BDS released first single and video, called "Eu Só Queria".

In 2023, after converting to Protestant Christianity, Leo Stronda announced his exit of the group.

== Musical style and lyrics ==
Bonde da Stronda was influenced mainly by Prexeca Bangers. Most of the group's songs are written by Mr. Thug. With blends of hip hop, rap, funk and rock mainly talking to `enjoy life`, the group also turn their pop romantic talking about love and passion, it is clear in their discography. But too many songs about prejudice, friends, family several times cited as their fans. His history and fight to get where they are.

== Members ==
Current members

- Mr. Thug (Diego Raphael Villanueva) (2006–present)
- Léo Stronda (Leonardo Schulz Cardoso) (2006–present)

Former members

- MC Cot (Marcus Vinicius Mello) (2006–2007)
- MC Night (Patrick Baptista Lopes) (2006–2008)

== Discography ==
=== Albums ===
Date of Release	Title	Label
2008	Stronda Style	Self-release
2009	Nova Era da Stronda	Galerão Records
2011	A Profecia	Galerão Records
2012	Corporação	Galerão Records
2013	Feito pras Damas	Galerão Records
2013	O Lado Certo da Vida Certa	Galerão Records

=== Music videos ===
Date of Release	Title	Album
2009	Tic Tic Nervoso	Malhação ID
2010	Playsson Raiz	Nova Era da Stronda
2010	Mansão Thug Stronda (feat. Mr. Catra)	Nova Era da Stronda
2011	Tudo pra mim (feat. Babí Hainni)	A Profecia
2011	Hell De Janeiro (feat. Leleco22)	Single
2011	Esbórnia e Álcool	A Profecia
2012	Tem Que Respeitar (feat. Dudu Nobre)	Corporação
2012	Zika do Bagui (feat. Pollo)	Corporação
2012	Tem Espaço? Faz Tatuagem!	Single
2012	Bonde da Maromba	Single
2013	Minha Pira (feat. Hevo84)	Single
2013	Swing do Bonde (feat. Alandin)	Corporação
2013	Das Antigas	Corporação

== Shorty Awards ==
- Shorty Awards 2014 – Nominated
