= Corporação =

Studio album by Bonde da Stronda
- Released: 4 July 2012
- Genre: Hip hop
- Label: Galerão Records

Bonde da Stronda chronology
A Profecia (2011)	Corporação (2012)	Feito pras Damas (2013)

Corporação is the third studio album of the band Bonde da Stronda, released on 4 July 2012 by the label Galerão Records.

The first music video from the album is the song "Tem que Respeitar", launched on 13 July 2012, which makes music a mix of hip-hop with samba, where Dudu Nobre and Mr. Thug play their ukuleles together a rap beat. The music video was recorded at a friend's house of the band in Barra da Tijuca and had more than 140,000 views in its first day of release on the Internet.

The recordings of the second music video from the album with the song "Zika do Bagui" began on 30 August 2012. The music video had its official launch on 4 October 2012.

Bonde da Stronda already finished recording the third music video of the album, which began in February 2013 with the song "Swing do Bonde", it was officially released on 15 March 2013 with the participation of Alandin.

== Track list ==
1. "Zika do Bagui (feat. Pollo)" – 4:19
2. "Swing do Bonde (feat. Alandin MC)" – 4:48
3. "Perdão, Pela Minha Vida Louca (feat. MP)" – 4:30
4. "Ela Tem Estilo" – 3:54
5. "SWAG" – 4:32
6. "Tem que respeitar (feat. Dudu Nobre)" – 3:46
7. "É Nós Família" – 5:26
8. "Playsson Raiz" – 3:26
9. "Nossa Química" – 4:10
10. "A Profecia" – 5:35
11. "Esbórnia e Álcool" – 3:59
12. "XXT" – 3:17
13. "Mansão Thug Stronda (feat. Mr. Catra)" – 6:09
14. "Das Antigas" – 5:27

== Music videos ==
Year	Single	Info
2012	"Tem que Respeitar"	Release date: 13 July 2012; Featuring: Dudu Nobre; Production: Galerão Filmes; Director: Babi Haínni
2012	"Zika do Bagui"	Release date: 4 October 2012; Featuring: Pollo; Production: Galerão Filmes; Director: Babi Haínni e Daniel Lima
2013	"Swing do Bonde"	Release date: 15 March 2013; Featuring: Alandin; Production: JMCD Channel; Director: Junior Marques
