= Dudu Nobre =

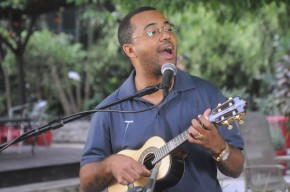

Background information
- Born: João Eduardo de Salles Nobre; November 6, 1973 (age 52)
- Origin: Brazil
- Genres: Samba, pagode
- Website: www.dudunobre.com.br

João Eduardo de Salles Nobre, known as Dudu Nobre (Rio de Janeiro, RJ, November 6, 1973), is a Brazilian composer and singer.

== Biography ==
He is the son of João Nobre and Anita Nobre. His mother controlled three pagode bands, where Dudu, already in his infancy, used to play with tam-tam and pandeiro. As a result, when he was six years old, he started to study piano and three years later received the instrument that would never separate from him—the cavaquinho.

When Dudu was ten, he joined a samba school. There, he met Beto "Sem Braço" (Without arm) and the two starred in the samba-enredo of Alegria da Passarela, a school that later became Aprendizes do Salgueiro, the school for beginners owned by GRES Acadêmicos do Salgueiro. "Beto was one of the most experienced (sambistas) that I ever knew," Dudu cites in his official site.

After this, he attributed credit to three sambas in Aprendizes do Salgueiro, another in Herdeiros da Vila, and one more in Estrelinha da Mocidade and also in Império do Futuro. This as an adolescent composer.

As a musician, when he was thirteen, he made a cycle of shows with Mocidade Independente de Padre Miguel and at 15 performed in Switzerland, Finland, England, and Germany, with Cia. Brasiliana.

Back in Brazil, he joined the band of Almir Guineto and later played with Dicró and Pedrinho da Flor. When Dudu was 19 years old, he joined the band of Zeca Pagodinho, same epoch when Dudu entered into the Law Faculty. The advocacy was repealed in the fifth year.

Dudu writes that "Zeca is a godfather. He told me that samba is a passion and that I was chosen by samba".

Dudu was married with model and dancer Adriana Bombom and has two daughters: Olivia and Thalita. They got divorced in 2009. He is the brother of the standard bearer Lucinha Nobre.

Dudu in 2014, won the samba schools Viradouro and Mocidade. where he also serves as the main performer, alongside Bruno Ribas

In 2022, he performed cosplayed as a baby in the reality singing competition The Masked Singer Brasil.

Dudu is a cousin of Brazilian singer Seu Jorge. He is of Cape Verdean descent.

== Compositions ==
Among the musics that really succeeded, are detached:

1. Vou botar teu nome na macumba (I am going to put your name in the macumba);
2. Posso até me apaixonar (I might even fall in love);
3. ...São Jorge, Anastácia e as crianças (...Saint George, Anastsia, and the children);
4. Água da Minha Sede (Water of my thirst);
5. Pro Amor Render (For love to surrender);
6. Chegue Mais (Come closer).

== partnership ==
1. Bonde da Stronda – "Tem que Respeitar" feat. Dudu Nobre
