= Mama Drama (TV series) =

- Written by: Krystal Jones-Cooley
- Country of origin: United States
- Original language: English
- No. of seasons: 1
- No. of episodes: 10

Production
- Executive producers: Shelly Tatro; Brad Abramson
- Producer: Krystal Jones-Cooley
- Running time: 60 Minutes
- Production company: 495 Productions

Original release
- Network: VH1
- Release: July 18 – September 2, 2012

Mama Drama is a ten-episode reality television series that focuses on five mother-daughter pairs who are put together in a penthouse in Las Vegas, Nevada.

== Cast ==
| Family | Hometown | Age |
|---|---|---|
| Loren, Whitney and Britney | Powder Springs, Georgia | Loren - 39 & Britney/Whitney - 23 |
| Marcella and Gina | Baltimore, Maryland | Marcella - 25 & Gina - 49 |
| Ashley and Sharon | Houston, Texas | Ashley - 23 & Sharon - 42 |
| Debbie and Gina | Butler, NJ | Debbie - 49 & Gina - 24 |
| Vanessa and Jay | Edmonds, Washington | Vanessa - 23 & Jay - 46 |

== Episodes ==
| Episode | U.S. Air Date |
|---|---|
| "Welcome to Vegas" | July 18, 2012 |
| "The Snatch" | July 25, 2012 |
| "Battle Lines" | July 26, 2012 |
| "Leave Us Alone" | August 1, 2012 |
| "Jay's Secret" | August 8, 2012 |
| "Mama Drama" | August 15, 2012 |
| "Broken Glass" | August 22, 2012 |
| "My New Mom" | August 29, 2012 |
| "Time Apart" | September 1, 2012 |
| "Truth and Consequences" | September 2, 2012 |
