= Stronda =

Brazilian music genre

- Stylistic origins: Hip hop, rapcore, pop, funk carioca, dirty rap, gangsta rap
- Cultural origins: 2004, Rio de Janeiro, Brazil
- Typical instruments: Rapping – vocals – electric guitar – bass guitar – drums

Stronda is a subgenre of Brazilian hip hop music and a cross-genre that has elements of hip hop, funk, pop, surf music and rock that started in 2004 in Rio de Janeiro with the group Prexeca Bangers The press noted the "politically incorrect" and divisive nature of their music, stemming from the vulgarity of their lyrics and choices of subject matter. In 2006, the group Bonde da Stronda saw nationwide success and a wave of media attention, inspiring the formation of several other groups.

Though the genre was born in Rio de Janeiro, the scene quickly grew across the nation. Notably, D'Boss, a group from Brasilia, was the first non-Rio group to perform at a Stronda event in Rio. Several other groups, such as Divissão dos Playssons and BS Love, have emerged from other Brazilian states and are gaining popularity.

Stronda emerged from an attempt to blend American hip-hop styles with issues relating to Brazil. Many Stronda artists have spoken out against their perception that non-Brazilians are "prejudiced" against their genre, as it largely pertains to slum culture and Brazilian lifestyles.
