= Léo Stronda =

Brazilllian bodybuilder (born 1992)

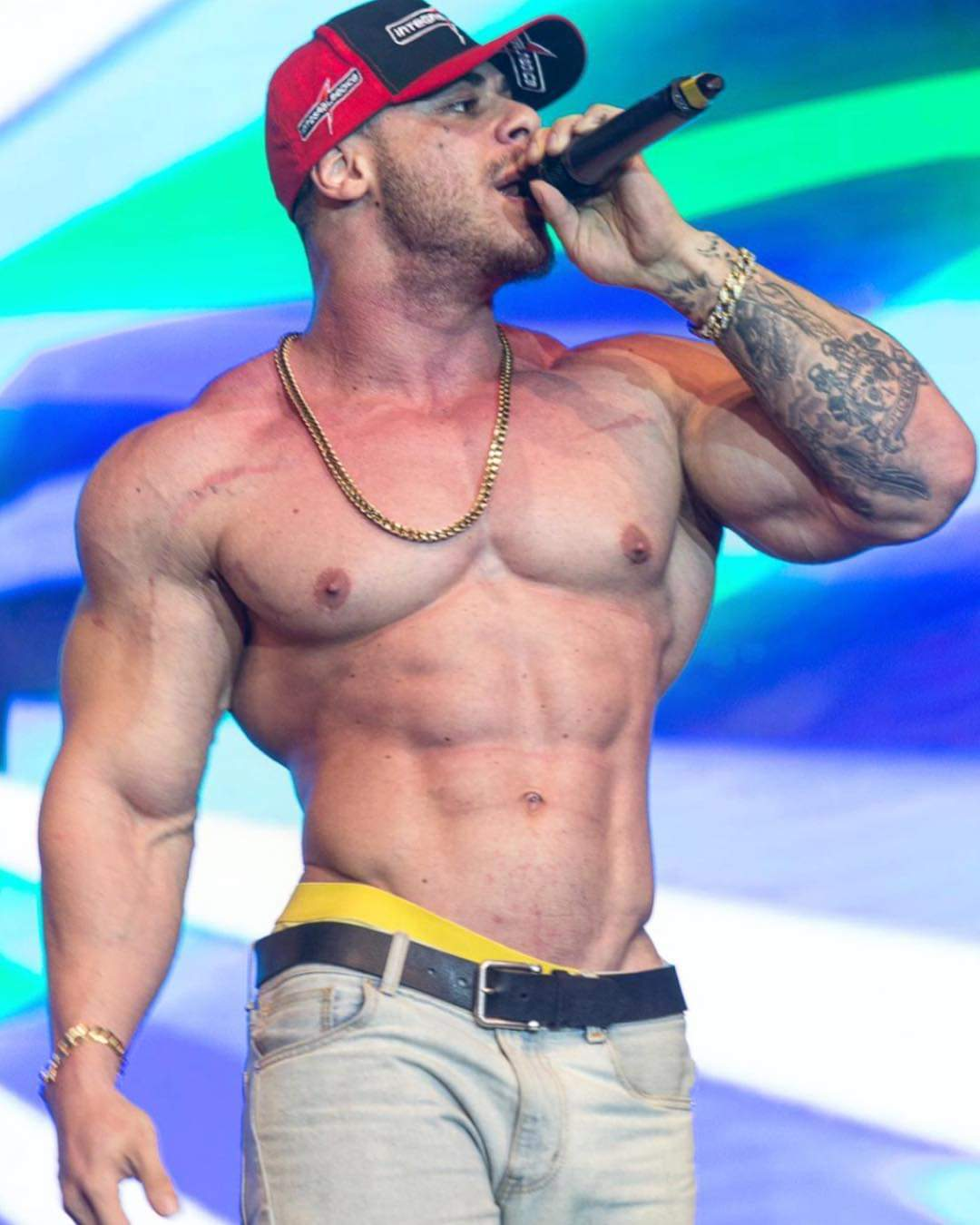
- Léo Stronda in 2018

Background information
- Also known as: Léo Stronda, Monster
- Born: Leonardo Schulz Cardoso; July 5, 1992 (age 34); Rio de Janeiro, Brazil
- Genres: Hip hop; pop
- Occupations: Singer; songwriter; model; bodybuilder; fashion designer
- Instrument: Vocals
- Years active: 2006-2023 (on music)
- Formerly of: Bonde da Stronda

Leonardo Schulz Cardoso (born July 5, 1992), also known as Leo Stronda, is a Brazilian bodybuilder, YouTuber and former rapper. He was vocalist and one of the founders of the hip-hop duo Bonde da Stronda. He is also known for his clothing line, XXT Corporation. Stronda had a channel in Brazil about bodybuilding named "Fábrica de Monstros", with more than 2,5 million subscribers, which he lost due to contract problems. His new channel is called simply "Leo Stronda" and it currently has around 3 million subscribers.

== Biography ==
Leonardo Schulz Cardoso was born 5 July 1980, in Rio de Janeiro, Brazil. He is a childhood friend of Diego Villanueva, with whom he formed the group Bonde da Stronda in 2006.

Cardoso is also a bodybuilder who began to be interested in the sport at the age of 16. He has participated in several competitions. The single "Bonde da Maromba" references his bodybuilding and was released along with a music video on 17 December 2012. His social media presence includes posts on nutrition, health, wellness, training tips as well as projects and competitions.

== Clothing line ==
Cardoso is the founder and owner of the alternative clothing line "XXT Corporation". His latest collection released is "Lion Schulz".

== Personal life ==
On March 6, 2023, Stronda announced on his YouTube channel that he is no longer part of Bonde da Stronda. He said that he is "thirsty for Jesus Christ" and that he now defends a new ideology.

Stronda is a Christian.

== Viral incident (2017) ==
In January 2017, an explicit nude photograph of Léo Stronda was leaked online, showing him taking a mirror selfie in which his flaccid penis was visible. The image quickly spread across Brazilian social media platforms, including Twitter, WhatsApp, and Facebook, generating widespread public attention. According to Stronda, the image was accessed after his then-girlfriend accidentally left her phone at a shopping mall, where it was subsequently stolen and hacked. The leak drew commentary not only because of the violation of privacy but also due to the remarkably large size of his genitalia.

Stronda publicly addressed the incident, explaining that the photo was leaked after his partner lost her old phone, which contained the image. He expressed regret over the situation but also made light of it, joking about the "three legs" meme that emerged in response to the photo.
