= Bad Girls Club season 4 =

Bad Girls Club
- Season 4
- The original seven bad girls, from left to right: Annie, Portia, Natalie, Kate, Kendra, Florina, and Amber
- No. of episodes: 16

Release
- Original network: Oxygen
- Original release: December 1, 2009 – March 23, 2010

Season chronology
- ← Previous; Season 3 Next → Season 5

The fourth season of Bad Girls Club premiered on December 1, 2009, on Oxygen. This season's reunion was hosted by Perez Hilton and is the first season to have more than one part. Oxygen renewed Bad Girls Club for a fourth season in April 2009. Production of the season 4 began in June 2009, similar to seasons 1 to 3.

Casting began several weeks before the season premiere of season 3, with potential applicants submitting video tape submissions. Casting calls, similar to previous seasons of the Bad Girls Club, began in Los Angeles, California and later other major cities Atlanta, Buffalo, Oakland, Chicago, and Philadelphia.

== House ==
The Bad Girls Club house, similar to previous seasons, features free accessories such as shoes, purses, and jewelries which were displayed as add-ons on the walls of the house. The middle of the house had a "light fixture", with pink and purple décor. The fixture also had patterns of high heels, which were displayed above the centered circular small black couch. In the living room, the girls were given spotted light color couches, in front of paintings of various cities.

Close to the paintings was Bad Girls Club oath, which sits above the fireplace. The girls were given a 1960s replica of a wall Trimphone, instead of today's modern house phones. Inside the girls rooms were adult toys and statues of half naked men on the walls of some of the girls rooms. There was a "Screaming O" vending machine which the girls had to pay a fee in order to receive adult toys, similar to a full-line vending. The vanity room featured 1960s furniture, where the girls apply beauty supplies and/or get ready for clubbing.

The jacuzzi was placed in front of the computer, which had speakers connected. The jacuzzi was inside the house. In the back of the house, the girls had a modern pool, and an outside modern swing, where the girls could get some shade. Inside the pool was a queen size floating bed. The kitchen had a more 1970s look, with light patterns. The girls were given gas stoves. The kitchen table featured light green, black, white, and orange colors.

Around the house, former bad girls, most famous quotes and a picture of themselves were displayed all over the mansion. For the "new comers" their self-portraits were left blank. When Natalie and Annie showed up first inside the house, they quickly targeted the other new girls pictures with first impression comments, which didn't sit right when the girls began arriving to the house. Once Portia left, her most famous quote was displayed with her photo, in the bad girls house.

During the season finale of season 4, all seven girls were given their spot on the walls, with their most famous quotes and a picture of themselves. Pictures of former bad girls housemates were displayed around the house, where the most intense arguments, fights, and break-downs occurred. A photo of their breakdowns were featured in the locations where the moment had happened.

== Cast ==
The season began with seven original bad girls. One left voluntarily and three were removed by production. One replacement bad girl was introduced in their absences later in the season.

Name	Age (Note: Age at time of filming)	Hometown	Nickname	Replaced
Amber McWha	23	Morgantown, West Virginia	The Trash Talker	—N/a
Annie Andersen	25	Los Angeles, California	The Control Freak	—N/a
Florina "Flo" Kaja	26	New Dorp, New York	The Enforcer	—N/a
Kate Squillace	23	Gloucester, Massachusetts	The Prima Donna	—N/a
Kendra James	22	Charlotte, North Carolina	The Double Standard	—N/a
Natalie Nunn	24	Oakland, California	The Socialite	—N/a
Portia Beaman	24	Kansas City, Missouri	The Pistol	—N/a
Lexie Woltz	21	Belleville, Illinois	The Wild Child	Portia

=== Duration of cast ===
Bad Girl	Episodes												
Bad Girl	1	2	3	4	5	6	7	8	9	10	11	12	13
Amber	Featured												
Annie	Featured												
Kendra	Featured												
Lexie					Entered (Note: Lexie replaced Portia.)	Featured							
Kate	Featured												removed (Note: Kate was removed from the house after punching Annie and starting a physical altercation with Amber and Lexie.)
Natalie	Featured										removed (Note: Natalie was removed from the house after starting a physical altercation with Kendra, Lexie and Amber.)		
Florina	Featured									Left (Note: Florina voluntarily left the house after a heated altercation with Annie, Amber, Kendra, Lexie, and Natalie.)			
Portia	Featured			removed (Note: Portia was removed from the house after physically attacking Natalie.)			Appeared (Note: Portia made an appearance for a photo shoot with Oxygen.)						

== Episodes ==
No. overall	No. in season	Title	Original release date	Viewers (millions)
62	1	"Off the Wall"	December 1, 2009	0.874
In the Season 4 premiere, seven new "bad girls" — Annie, Flo, Kate, Kendra, Natalie, Portia and Amber — swoop in on a luxury Los Angeles mansion and try to coexist with one another. Annie and Natalie decide to ditch the other girls before even meeting them to a club. The other girls find out Natalie has been talking bad about them, before meeting them. The other girls meet up with Annie and Natalie at the club, ending with a huge argument between them. The girls stick up for Portia after she gets her hair pulled in a club. Kendra starts an argument with Portia after Portia took Annie's bed, when she wasn't at the house. Natalie and Amber have an altercation at the house.
63	2	"I Run LA!"	December 8, 2009	1.412
Natalie is in for a rude awakening when the other Bad Girls won't bend to her ways. As the other girls resist Natalie's various attempts at house dominance, Kate quickly discovers her inner Bad Girl when she stands up to Natalie by spraying Windex in Natalie's face. After Natalie breaks up with her boyfriend, she gets upset at the club and wants to leave early, leading to an argument between her and the other girls. During the limo argument, Natalie punches Kendra twice in the face. Kendra has the decision of sending her home.
64	3	"No More Nice Girls"	December 15, 2009	1.420
The other girls think that Kendra will send Natalie home, but in a shocking outcome, she decides to keep her in the house, dividing the house in 2. A push for house dominance and an unexpected betrayal highlight the dramas between Flo and Natalie.
65	4	"Can Buy Me Love"	December 22, 2009	1.767
Portia's home life takes its toll. Annie tries her luck at speed dating. Portia finally snaps when Natalie goes too far with her self which leads to a heated argument. Portia is sent home after physically attacking Natalie after Natalie was degrading Portia's parenting. Note: Portia is removed from the house.
66	5	"Don't Sweat the New Bitch"	January 5, 2010	1.682
The newest bad girl, Lexie, arrives at the house and stumbles into a house divided where she is expected to choose sides. Natalie's relationship with Olamide takes a turn for the worse, leading her to set her sights on a new man. Note: Lexie replaces Portia.
67	6	"Paul and Kate Plus Hate"	January 12, 2010	1.773
Kate's boyfriend Paul visits, bringing out the worst in Natalie and prompting Kate to defend her man's honor which almost leads to a fight between the two caused by Natalie spitting on her. Flo's disapproval of Kendra's promiscuous lifestyle leads to a confrontation between the two in which case Kendra slaps Flo and Flo pushes her. Lexie has trouble finding a guy she is interested in Los Angeles.
68	7	"Bad Break"	January 19, 2010	2.009
Portia returns to the show for the seasons promotional photo shoot. When Flo sets out to impress a woman, an appalled Amber's disapproval of Flo's same-sex desire ignites a fiery confrontation that results in Amber pushing Flo into the pool, leading Flo to attack Amber. Flo goes to the hospital and finds out her ankle is sprained. Amber has the choice to send Flo home after the other girls told her Flo was threatening her to the fullest extent. Amber decides to keep Flo in the house after Flo kept pleading her case to stay in the house. Note: Portia made an appearance.
69	8	"Friend??? Or Frenemy?"	January 26, 2010	1.908
Natalie lures Kate into an unlikely alliance, triggering an angry backlash from the rest of the ladies. Annie, fed up with being walked all over, finally develops a harder edge and starts yelling at Natalie for all she has done to her, leading to the other girls happy that Annie finally stuck up for herself.
70	9	"Sex, Lies and Bigfoot"	February 2, 2010	1.617
Kate explores carnal adventures with her come-hither gal pal Trish, a move that jeopardizes her relationship with Paul. Meanwhile, Natalie and Flo, once allied bosom buddies, now square off as rancorous enemies.
71	10	"Go With the Flo"	February 9, 2010	2.227
Natalie gains Amber's respect during a street brawl between Amber and a club patron. Amber's boyfriend visits, giving Amber a new sense of hope for their relationship. After Flo realizes that the girls are trying to get her out of the house, she goes on crazy mode trying to fight Kendra, leading her to shockingly leave the house. While she is leaving, Annie, Kendra, Natalie and Amber decide to throw water balloons at her. Note: Florina voluntarily leaves the house.
72	11	"The Puppet Master"	February 16, 2010	2.139
The ladies (minus Annie and Kate) head to Santa Barbara for vacation and a respite from thorny mansion politics. House rivals Annie and Kate argue almost the whole time their at home, while Annie continues to pull vicious pranks on Kate. Natalie and Kendra both get in trouble with the law and tensions arises between the both of them. A heated argument between Kendra and Natalie leads to Natalie pushing Kendra to the ground and them fighting. Lexie and Amber try and help break the fight up, but Natalie decides to fight them too. The girls minus Natalie return to the house and tell Annie and Kate about the shocking fight which lead to everyone covered in dirt and scratches. The episode ends with Natalie getting into a random person's car. Note: Natalie is removed from the house.
73	12	"Clip Show"	February 23, 2010	1.784
Annie & Natalie host this bad girls special that recaps unseen footage on this season including bonus scenes.
74	13	"Amber Alert!"	March 2, 2010	1.667
The girls find out that Natalie will not be returning to the house. The house celebrates by packing all of her things and throwing them at the end of the driveway. Annie comes out swinging, wielding her new found sense of power by rounding up the other ladies and leading a charge to evict Kate from the mansion. Elsewhere, Amber Meade and Amber Buhl from last season of the Bad Girls Club come to the house. Kate is sick of the constant bullying from the other girls and decides to go on a rampage, breaking things throughout the house and eventually punching Annie in the face. The episode ends in a cliffhanger with a fight between Kate and Amber and Lexie.
75	14	"Out With a Bang"	March 9, 2010	1.905
In the Season 4 finale, Kate reaches her breaking point and gets into a physical altercation with Amber and Lexie, leading to her removal from the bad girls club house. The remaining "bad girls" bid adieu to one another. They decide to go out with a big bang by planning a grand bikini parade and taking a cross-country adventure. The girls ditch Annie and go on a roadtrip. Note: Kate is removed from the house.
76	15	"Reunion: Part 1"	March 16, 2010	2.003
The Cast of Season 4 return in L.A. to discuss what happened during their 3 month stay in the Bad Girls Club House. Kate returns and explains what made her snap and hit Annie and attack Amber. Natalie returns and spits on Kate again which causes a fight. Flo's anger leads to a table-flipping showdown with Natalie.
77	16	"Reunion: Part 2"	March 23, 2010	2.062
Flo gets to the root of her anger and attacks Natalie then argues with Perez Hilton. Portia returns and faces off with Natalie one last time. Kendra has some exciting news to share with everyone. Meanwhile, Amber's boyfriend Rich has a surprise for her.
