= List of Love & Hip Hop: Miami cast members =

Love & Hip Hop: Miami is the fourth installment of the Love & Hip Hop reality television franchise. It premiered on January 1, 2018, on VH1 and chronicles the lives of several people in the Miami area, involved with hip hop music.

The series has a large ensemble cast, with leading cast members in the opening credits, and a sprawling supporting cast, who are credited as "additional cast" or "featured" in the show's end credits. These secondary cast members appear in green screen confessional segments and (for the most part) have the same amount of screen time and storyline focus as the show's main cast members. Over the years, several supporting cast members have been upgraded to lead.

== Cast timeline ==
Main cast (appears in opening credits)
Secondary cast (appears in green screen confessional segments and in end credits alongside the main cast)
Guest cast (appears in a guest role or cameo)

Main cast members
Cast member	Seasons									
Cast member	1	2	3	4A	4B	5A	5B	6A	6B	7
Trina	Starring									
Trick Daddy	Starring									
Amara La Negra	Starring									
Shay Johnson	Starring			Guest (Note: Appears in the Love & Hip Hop Miami: Inside the 305 special only.)	Supporting			Starring		
Bobby Lytes	Starring			Supporting						
Gunplay	Starring			Guest		Supporting				
Veronica Vega	Starring									
Prince	Starring									
Jojo Zarur	Supporting	Starring	Supporting							
Sukihana			Starring							
PreMadonna			Starring							
Hood Brat			Starring							
Brisco			Starring							
Joseline Hernandez			Starring							
Florence El Luche				Starring						
Noreaga		Guest		Starring						
Neri Santiago				Starring						
Ace Hood	Guest			Starring						
Shelah Marie				Starring						
Ray J		Guest		Supporting		Starring			Supporting	
Princess Love				Supporting		Starring			Supporting	
Safaree Samuels						Starring				
Zoey Brinxx						Supporting		Starring		Supporting
Blac Chyna									Starring	
Derrick Milano									Starring	
Michael Blackson										Starring
Rada										Starring
Supporting cast members
Cast member	Seasons									
Cast member	1	2	3	4A	4B	5A	5B	6A	6B	7
Young Hollywood	Supporting									
Mami Ana	Supporting		Guest							
Keyara Stone	Supporting									
Pleasure P	Supporting									
Miami Tip	Supporting					Supporting				
Joy Young	Supporting									
Gabby Davis	Supporting									
Jeffrey White	Supporting									
Michelle Pooch	Supporting									
Malik Williams	Supporting									
Liz Cifuentes	Supporting									
Steph Lecor	Supporting									
Juju C.	Supporting									
Lil Scrappy	Supporting			Guest						
Chinese Nicky	Supporting	Guest								
Chinese Kitty	Supporting									
Faride Nemer	Supporting	Guest								
Baby Blue Whoaaaa	Supporting									
Jessie Woo		Supporting								
Spectacular	Guest	Supporting								
Khaotic		Supporting	Guest							
Nikki Natural			Supporting							
Emjay Johnson			Supporting		Supporting					
Gaelle Jacques				Supporting						
Kill Bill				Supporting						
Raymond Taylor	Guest			Supporting			Guest			
C.O. Piscapo			Guest	Supporting	Guest					
Marlon Dure				Supporting						
Isaiah Henderson				Supporting						
One Snoop Monzta				Guest	Supporting					
Momma Dee					Supporting					
Jay Kelly					Supporting					
Jullian Boothe		Guest			Supporting					
Sandra Sims					Supporting					
Vonshae						Supporting				
Fabo						Supporting	Guest			
Supa Cindy						Supporting				
Aisha Hollywood						Supporting				
Daisha Hollywood						Supporting				
Allan Muses				Guest			Supporting			
Estelita Quintero							Supporting			
Claudia						Supporting				
Eliza Reign						Supporting				
Bigg D							Supporting			
Brooke Valentine							Supporting			
Marcus Black							Supporting			
Hawt Topic									Supporting	
Sounique									Supporting	
Marquez									Supporting	
Shamya Reign								Guest	Supporting	
Yani									Supporting	
Beau Swurv								Guest	Supporting	
Pinkydoll									Supporting	
Van								Guest	Supporting	
Vicky									Supporting	
Madonna									Supporting	
Mike Nasty									Supporting	
Chyng Diamond									Supporting	
Kent Jones										Supporting
Asian Goddess Cat										Supporting
Claudia Jordan										Supporting
Sonyae										Supporting
Nadia Ali										Supporting
Jacquae										Supporting
Larissa “Bootz” Hodge										Supporting

== Main cast members ==
=== Original cast members ===
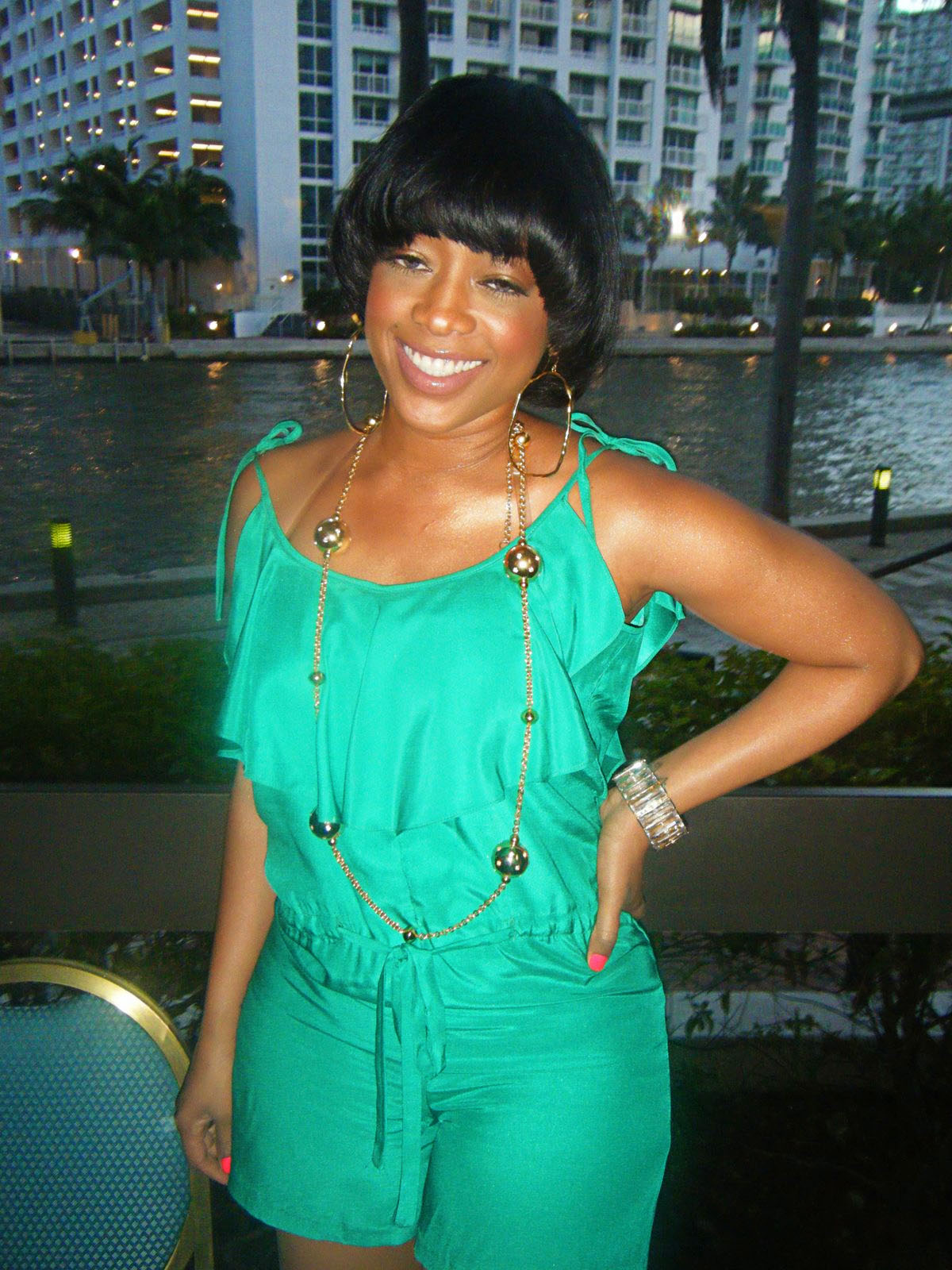
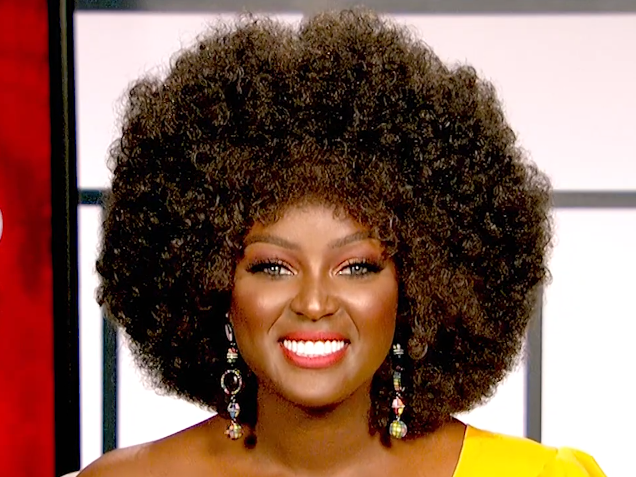
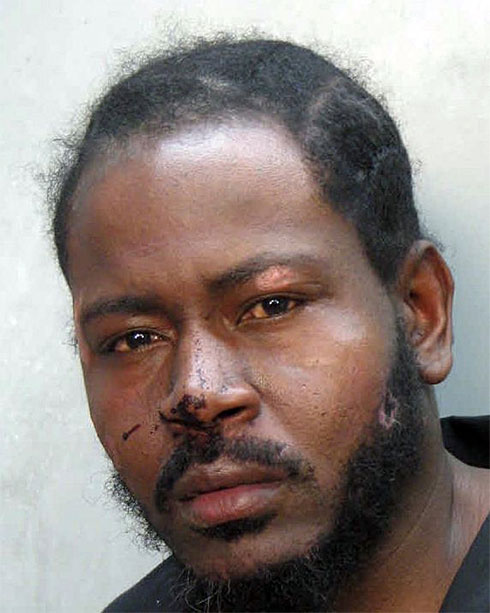
Trina (top), Amara La Negra (middle) and Trick Daddy (bottom) are original cast members on Love & Hip Hop: Miami.
- Trina, born Katrina Laverne Taylor, is a rapper. She grew up in Liberty City and was raised by a Dominican father and Bahamian mother. She made her rap debut on Trick Daddy's 1998 Billboard Hot 100 single "Nann Nigga" and rose to fame in the early 2000s with the release of her debut album Da Baddest Bitch. Trina made her first appearance in the Love & Hip Hop franchise in an episode of Love & Hip Hop Atlanta: After Party Live, as well as Sguest appearances in seasons two and three of the spin-off K. Michelle: My Life, acting as K's friend and mentor and offering her career advice. The first season of Love & Hip Hop: Miami chronicles Trina's latest music projects, including the launch of TNT, a joint album with Trick Daddy, and her sixth solo album The One. The season also explores her family life, including her strained relationship with her flamboyant cousin Bobby, who is in a violent feud with her assistant Alvin, and her cousin Joy, who is trying to find closure after the failure of her marriage to Trick. In season two, tensions between her and Trick Daddy explode as she struggles to get their album finished, before scrapping the project all together. In season three, while reeling from the death of her mother, she assembles a tour to showcase Miami's up-and-coming female rappers. However, she later scraps the idea after a "boot camp" rehearsal turns into an all-out brawl between the girls. Trina also appears as a guest star in season eight of Love & Hip Hop: New York, while filming a music video with her protégé Brittney Taylor, and in the special 40 Greatest Love & Hip Hop Moments: The Reboot.
- Prince (Seasons 1–2), born Christopher Michael Harty, is a promoter, brand ambassador, model and recording artist. He is the self-proclaimed "Fresh Prince of South Beach", born and raised in South Miami to Jamaican parents. He endured a rough life as a teenager and young adult, including two years in a juvenile facility and several years homeless, which led to a series of arrests from 2010 until 2013 for theft, disorderly conduct and resisting arrest. He eventually turned his life around and landed a job with Varsity LG, one of Miami's largest event promotions companies. In 2015, he appeared in Trina's music video for her single "Fuck Boy". The first season chronicles the excesses of his "party boy" lifestyle, which has put a strain on his relationship with Liz, his girlfriend of three years. He has an intense rivalry with fellow party promoter Michelle Pooch, sparked by a violent brawl at the launch of his denim line. Later, he and Liz break up, and at the reunion, he is exposed as having cheated on her with Gabby. Prince's close friendship with the openly gay rapper Bobby Lytes becomes a source of speculation in the show's second season, when the two have a violent falling out after Prince rekindles his relationship with Liz. During the season, he embarks on a music career under the name Papii Sham Poo. Prince was included as a cast member in the press release for season three, however ultimately did not appear.
- Amara La Negra, born Diana Danelys De Los Santos, is an Afro-Latina entertainer, singer and actress of Dominican descent. She grew up in Miami as the only child of a single mother who immigrated to the United States from the Dominican Republic. In 2013, she released the single "Ayy" which became a hit in the Latin market. However, she has experienced difficulties being accepted in her home country due to her dark skin and afro, and was even parodied in blackface on the Dominican variety show Aquí Se Habla Español by former beauty queen Geisha Montes de Oca. The series chronicles her attempts to crossover to the mainstream American market. In the first season, she comes into conflict with light skinned Latino producer Young Hollywood after he criticises her afro during a business meeting. After tearfully confiding in her friends Veronica Vega and Steph Lecor, they attempt to act as peacemakers, however this backfires, leading to a dramatic and violent falling out between La Negra and Vega. Season two chronicles her feud with comedienne and aspiring singer Jessie Woo, who accuses Amara and her manager Jullian Boothe of stealing her talk show idea, as well as flirting with her boyfriend. Later in the season, she ends her friendship with Jojo, after Jojo claims she put roots on her. Season three chronicles her relationship struggles with bachata singer Emjay, after he helps sever her ties with Jullian. La Negra was dubbed by Billboard as the show's "breakout star", landing a multi-album record deal with BMG hours after the show's premiere. Her storyline, which explores with colorism and eurocentrism within the Latin community, has garnered significant media attention. She also appears as a guest star in season two of Leave It to Stevie, while performing at his event, and in season five of Love & Hip Hop: Hollywood, while filming a movie with Paris Phillips, as well as the specials Love & Hip Hop Awards: Most Certified and 40 Greatest Love & Hip Hop Moments: The Reboot.
- Gunplay (Seasons 1–2), born Richard Morales Jr. and also known as Don Logan, is a rapper. He was born in El Paso, Texas to parents of Jamaican and Puerto Rican descent and grew up in Carol City in South Florida. He is a practitioner of Santería. He made his rap debut as part of Rick Ross' Southern hip hop group Triple C's, before embarking on a solo career. He has had a very public battle with cocaine addiction. In 2012, he faced a life sentence in prison after being arrested for armed robbery, assault with a deadly weapon and aggravated assault. Charges were later dropped and he relocated to Atlanta. Gunplay made his first franchise appearance as a supporting cast member in one episode of Love & Hip Hop: Atlanta, where he convinced his friend Lil Scrappy to move to Miami with him. The first season of Love & Hip Hop: Miami chronicles Gunplay's return to Miami and his battle with substance abuse and the temptations of gang life. It also explores his relationship struggles with Keyara, his girlfriend of two years, including his lingering feelings for ex-girlfriend Miami Tip, and a suspected relapse after the death of a close friend. In season two, the couple have separated after Keyara discovers he has been messaging other women, including Amara. During the season, he attempts to win her back, however he is unsuccessful. Gunplay was included as a cast member in the press release for season three, however ultimately did not appear. He returned to the franchise briefly in 2021 in the special Inside the 305.
- Veronica Vega (Seasons 1–2), born Cristal Marye Cue, is a rapper and recording artist. She was born and raised in Hialeah, Florida to a Cuban father and Venezuelan mother. She began her career under the name Cristal Q and appeared as a video girl in the music video for Chris Brown's 2007 single "Kiss Kiss". She is signed to Zone 4 under the mentorship of Polow da Don. Vega is known for her single "Wicked", which features Pitbull, and her viral hit "Pay Me", which caused controversy for her use of the word "nigga". In the first season, Vega attempts to resolve Amara's issues with Young Hollywood by agreeing to go on a date with him, however it backfires, igniting a feud between the two girls. In the second season, she struggles with her career and providing for her family due to being labeled as "racist" from the events of the previous season. Later, she and Amara reconcile.
- Bobby Lytes (Seasons 1–3, supporting cast member in season 4), born Bobby Nico Wade, is a rapper. Lytes was born and raised in Homestead, Florida to Dominican parents. He is Trina's first cousin. In 2014, he was arrested multiple times for grand theft, larceny and probation violations. Lytes is the first openly gay main cast member in the franchise's history. The series chronicles his career struggles as a gay rapper in the homophobic hip hop industry. In the first season, Bobby discovers that Jeffrey, his boyfriend of a year and a half, has been cheating on him behind his back with his ex Malik, igniting a violent rivalry between the two men. In season two, his intense friendship with Prince drives several storylines, with his jealously over Prince's relationship with Liz leading to speculation that Bobby is actually in love with him. Although still credited as a main cast member in every episode of season three, Bobby has little-to-no storyline of his own, instead playing a supportive role to Trina as she grieves her mother. Bobby also appears in the specials Love & Hip Hop Awards: Most Certified, 40 Greatest Love & Hip Hop Moments: The Reboot and Inside the 305.
- Shay Johnson (Seasons 1–3, supporting cast member in season 4) is an urban model, reality television personality and fitness guru, originally from Atlanta, Georgia. A military brat, she also lived in Hawaii and Milwaukee as an adolescent. Shay is a former video vixen who appeared in hip hop videos for Fabolous and Young Dro, however, she is best known as "Buckeey" on the VH1 reality shows Flavor of Love and Charm School. Shay first appeared in the franchise as a supporting cast member in the first two seasons of Love & Hip Hop: Atlanta as Lil Scrappy's "friend-with-benefits". She admits that she has feelings for Scrappy, but he refuses to claim their relationship as anything more than casual sex. In the first season of Love & Hip Hop: Miami, Shay relocates to Miami for her man, Pleasure P, who she has been in a long-distance relationship with for two years. She quickly clashes with his Pretty Ricky group mate Baby Blue Whoaaaa, before igniting violent feuds with Pleasure's ex Gabby, who she dubs "Mint Chocolate" after the ice cream she threw at her, as well as "Instagram science experiments" Chinese Kitty and Chinese Nicky. During the season, her relationship with P falls apart. In season two, she struggles with uterine fibroids, amid a violent feud with Jojo. In season three, Shay forms a sisterly bond with Amara, when she begins dating her brother, Emjay. Shay also appears in the specials Love & Hip Hop Awards: Most Certified, 40 Greatest Love & Hip Hop Moments: The Reboot and Inside the 305.
- Trick Daddy, born Maurice Samuel Young, is a rapper and record producer. He is the self-proclaimed "Mayor of the 305", born and raised in Liberty City. Trick Daddy rose to fame in the early 2000s, with a string of Billboard Hot 100 hit singles and albums released on the label Slip-n-Slide Records. In 2009, he was diagnosed with lupus, which he refuses to take medication for. He has a long criminal history of drug possession and weapons charges and in recent years has faced a number of financial difficulties, having declared bankruptcy three times. He reportedly has ten children to eight mothers. In April 2016, Trick confirmed that he would be joining the cast of Love & Hip Hop: Miami, which would eventually premiere in January 2018. In the first season, he is reunited with his estranged wife Joy, who he has been separated from for four years, but refuses to finalise their divorce. In season two, he clashes with Trina while attempting to finish TNT, their joint album together, eventually abandoning the project all together. In season three, he opens a soul food restaurant, Sunday's Eatery, and begins a celibate relationship with model and aspiring rapper Nikki Natural, however his lingering feelings for Joy eventually break up the relationship. Later episodes chronicle the aftermath of his 2020 arrest for DUI and cocaine possession.

=== Season 2 additions ===
- Jojo Zarur (Season 2, supporting cast member in seasons 1, 3), born Joanna Nemar Zarur, is a celebrity stylist and entrepreneur, originally from Mexico City, Mexico. She grew up in Coral Gables, Florida, to a Mexican father and Lebanese-Arabic mother. She studied pre-law and economics at Stanford before meeting Young Thug in 2015. She dropped out to become his stylist. Jojo owns the boutique store Zarur Boutique, which is featured on the show, and her clients have included Offset, T-Pain and Jim Jones. Jojo appears as a supporting cast member in the first season, which focuses on her business ventures, amid tensions with her wealthy parents who are going through a divorce. She develops a close friendship with Amara, and sides with her in her feud with Veronica, Steph and Young Hollywood. She is promoted to main cast in season two, which chronicles her feuds with Miami Tip, Prince and Jessie Woo, while struggling to stay a loyal friend to Amara and Bobby. She begins dating Pleasure P, igniting a violent altercation with Shay, in which her wig is snatched. Later, she blames her recent bad luck on Amara putting roots on her, ending their friendship. Jojo returns in a supporting role in season three, after securing a deal with Tommy Hilfiger and entering a relationship with club promoter Big Larry. During the season, she reconciles with Amara, and ends her feud with Shay.

=== Season 3 additions ===
- PreMadonna (Season 3), born Nakeitha Chemera Felder Thomas and also known as PreMadonna87, is a fashion designer, entrepreneur and rapper. She grew up in Overtown. In 2006 and 2007, she was arrested multiple times for strong arm robbery, battery, petty theft and probation violations. She came into the public eye as the founder of Waist Gang Society, a line of women's shapewear and waist trainers, which were popularised by Kim Kardashian and Blac Chyna, and were the subject of a million-dollar class action lawsuit for misleading advertising. She has three children. PreMadonna first appeared in the franchise in a minor supporting role in season four of Love & Hip Hop: Atlanta, as a friend to Joseline, Jessica Dime and Dawn, coming to Atlanta from Miami to promote her fashion line. After two episodes, she is not seen again, and does not attend the season's reunion special. In April 2016, PreMadonna was cast in Love & Hip Hop: Miami, with her storyline reportedly tied to Trick Daddy, her manager at the time, and focused on her attempts to kickstart a rap career. She filmed scenes throughout the year for the show's presentation tape, titled Love & Hip Hop: 4th City, including her wedding ceremony to Buck, however she was dropped from the show when it was picked up by VH1. PreMadonna was added to the cast in season three, returning to Miami to straighten out her business and repair her friendship with Miami Tip. The season chronicles her feud with Joseline, with who she had a public falling out with years prior. Later, she clashes with Amara, after exposing Emjay's alleged financial issues.
- Hood Brat (Season 3) is a rapper. She grew up in Liberty City. She started her rap career under the name Nenah Blaque as part of the rap duo The Step Sisters, with Mona Vinci. Season three chronicles her struggles to take her career to the next level, and provide for the children of her late sister. During the season, she is dating Kenny Nwankwo, who she eventually discovers is still married.
- Sukihana (Seasons 3–5A), born Destiny Henderson, is a rapper and social media personality, originally from Wilmington, Delaware. She grew up in Atlanta and rose to fame while through her posts on Instagram, and for her viral songs, such as "Blame Trina", "5 Foot Freestyle" and "Drug Dealer" featuring Cuban Doll. Previously, she was on an episode of The Jerry Springer Show called "Sex For Rent". She has three children from previous relationships, the first she gave birth to at the age of 18. Season three chronicles her struggles to be taken seriously as an artist. During the season, she briefly enjoys an Instagram-fuelled "situationship" with the rapper Khaotic, and gets into violent brawls with Shay and Nikki Natural.
- Brisco (Season 3), born British Alexander Mitchell, is a rapper. He grew up in Opa-locka, Florida. He first gained notoriety after signing with Cash Money Records and collaborating with Lil Wayne, Flo Rida and Rick Ross, however his career was cut short when he was arrested in December 2016 and later sentenced to four years in federal prison on fraud charges. Season three chronicles his life after prison, as well as his relationship struggles with Chello, his one-time fiancée and baby mama.
- Joseline Hernandez (Season 3), also known as "The Puerto Rican Princess", is a Latin-American entertainer, originally from Ponce, Puerto Rico. Joseline first appeared in the franchise on Love & Hip Hop: Atlanta as one of the show's original cast members. She starred in the show's first six seasons, before dramatically quitting the series, amid tensions with executive producer Mona Scott-Young. Joseline joins the cast of Love & Hip Hop: Miami in season three, which chronicles her relationship with producer DJ Ballistic Beats, as well as her feud with PreMadonna, who she calls "PreMa-piggy". Despite being credited as a main cast member for the entire season and heavily featured in its promotional material, Joseline disappears from the show entirely after four episodes, after a series of interviews in which she criticised producer Mona Scott-Young, dismissing her as a "talent scout".

=== Season 4 additions ===
- Florence El Luche (Season 4) is a Haitian singer and self-professed "Queen of Kompa Music".
- Ace Hood (Season 4, guest star in season 1), born Antoine Franklin McColister, is a rapper, known for his hit singles, "Hustle Hard" and "Bugatti". He first appeared in season one as a guest star.
- Shelah Marie (Season 4) is Ace Hood's wife. She is a "meditation enthusiast", lifestyle entrepreneur and founder of the Curvy, Curly, Conscious movement.
- Noreaga (Season 4, guest star in season 2), born Victor Santiago Jr. and also credited as N.O.R.E., is a rapper, originally from Queens, New York. He previously made guest appearances on Love & Hip Hop: New York and in season two of Love & Hip Hop: Miami.
- Neri Santiago (Season 4) is Noreaga's wife.

== Supporting cast members ==
=== Original cast members ===
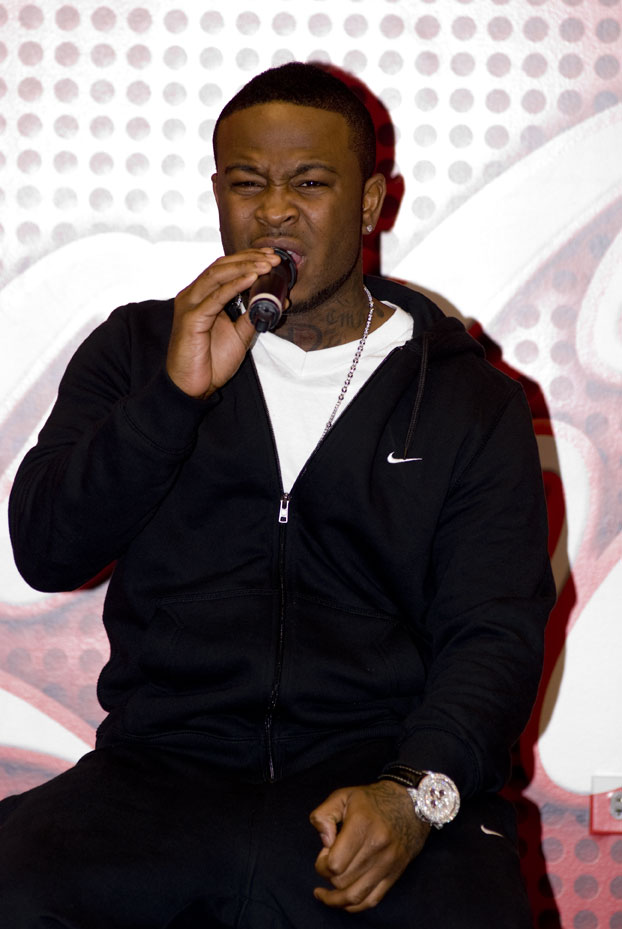
Pleasure P (top) appears as a supporting cast member in the first two seasons of Love & Hip Hop: Miami, along with the other members of Pretty Ricky (below).
- Young Hollywood (Seasons 1–2), born Elijah Alexander Sárraga, is a record producer and songwriter. He is known for his collaborations with Migos and Pitbull and is considered a pioneer of Latin trap music, having won a BMI Award in 2017. In the first season, he comes into conflict with Amara La Negra after he makes offensive comments about her appearance during a business meeting. His colorist comments, including calling Amara a "nutella queen" and describing her afro as "not elegant", generated a storm of controversy against Hollywood, including death threats. The two eventually come to an understanding and start working together, fracturing Amara's fragile friendship with Veronica and Steph. In season two, Hollywood and Amara officially move past their differences and are seen getting along. At the second season's reunion special, Hollywood asks Shay out on a date. Despite Shay confirming the two were in a relationship in later interviews, he is not seen on the show again.
- Mami Ana (Season 1, guest star in seasons 2–4), real name Ana Maria Oleaga, is Amara's mother. She is an Afro-Latina of Dominican descent who immigrated to the United States from the Dominican Republic before Amara was born. She endured a rough life initially in America, having to work two to three jobs to support her daughter. Mami Ana appears in a minor supporting role in the first season, appearing in only one green screen, shared with Amara. The two are depicted on the show as nearly inseparable, with Amara tearfully expressing her hope to be able to provide for her mother. She returns in a guest role in subsequent seasons.
- Keyara Stone (Seasons 1–2), is Gunplay's girlfriend. She is an urban model, brand ambassador and entrepreneur, originally from Chicago, Illinois. While in college, she became the victim of the city's notorious gun violence when she was caught in the crossfire of a gunfight and shot three times in her chest, ankle and arm, leaving her immobilised for 6 months and diagnosed with PTSD. In the first season, Keyara moves from Atlanta to Miami for Gunplay, and struggles with his substance abuse issues. In season two, the couple have broken up, after she discovers he has been messaging other women, including Amara, leading to a confrontation between the two women.
- Pleasure P (Seasons 1–2), born Marcus Ramone Cooper, is a Grammy Award-nominated R&B singer and songwriter. Pleasure is best known as a member of Pretty Ricky and the sole singer of the group. The first season chronicles Pleasure's turbulent relationship with Shay, which ends midway through the season after Shay gets into a brawl with his ex-girlfriend Gabby. He then pursues a romance with Joy, igniting a violent altercation between the two women. He briefly dates Jojo in season two. The second season also delves deeper into the lingering issues between him and his Pretty Ricky bandmates, including their tensions after Pleasure embarks on a solo tour in Australia. Pleasure was included as a cast member in the press release for season three, however ultimately did not appear.
- Miami Tip (Seasons 1–4), born Kenisha Renee Myree and also known as Tip Drill, is a rapper and entrepreneur, originally from Long Island, New York. She was raised in Coral Springs, Florida to parents of Puerto Rican and African-American descent. Tip rose to fame as a stripper on the South Beach Strip, with her best friend Skrawberry, who also appears on the show. She turned to music after a traumatic fall in 2012, when she fell 35 feet from a strip pole. The accident was so severe, Tip went into a coma for a week, had to have the entire left side of her face reconstructed, and lost a kidney. She is openly bisexual and has a son, Sincere, born in 2004, from a previous relationship. Tip appears in the first season as Bobby's close friend and confidante. During the season, she reconnects with her ex-boyfriend Gunplay, which initially puts her at odds with Keyara, which dissipates when Tip expresses sexual interest in her instead. In season two, she clashes with Jojo and Liz, when they get involved in the drama between Bobby and Prince. In season three, Tip embarks on a career as a talent manager, with Sukihana as one of her clients. During the season, she clashes with openly gay rapper and social media personality Saucy Santana, after she disagrees that his recent shooting incident was a hate crime.
- Joy Young is the estranged wife of Trick Daddy. She is Trina's cousin. She married Trick in 2003 and they have been separated for over four and half years. The first season explores her attempts to finalise her divorce, but Trick refuses to let go. She later pursues a romance with Pleasure P, sparking a brawl with his former girlfriend, Shay. In season two, she is pursued romantically by Khaotic, however she gently rejects any advances. Her issues with Trick remain unresolved, and later in the season, Trina gives her the money to settle her divorce. Season three chronicles her and Trick's lingering feelings for each other, when he begins dating model Nikki Natural. She briefly dates Brisco, who reveals he has a history with Nikki. Joy shares this information with Trick, igniting a feud between the two women when Trick kicks her out of his house. Later, she tries to support Trick through his legal issues, encouraging him to care more about his health.
- Gabby Davis (Season 1) is Pleasure's ex-girlfriend. She is a model, originally from Kingston, Jamaica. In the first season, she attempts to rekindle the flame with Pleasure P., igniting a feud with his girlfriend Shay. After Shay throws an ice cream at her after discovering the two together, she dubs her "Mint Chocolate". At the reunion, she is exposed as having had an affair with Prince behind his girlfriend Liz's back. In June 2019, Gabby made headlines when her affair with Love & Hip Hop: New York's Safaree Samuels was revealed, while he was engaged to Erica Mena. The scandal is later addressed in season ten of Love & Hip Hop: New York.
- Jeffrey White (Season 1) is Bobby's boyfriend of the past year and a half. He is a model and men's swimwear designer. He was born in Dade County, Florida and grew up in Atlanta, Georgia. His father is rapper JT Money. During the first season, he rekindles his relationship with his closeted ex-boyfriend Malik, igniting an intense feud between the two men. Malik ends their relationship on the reunion stage.
- Michelle Pooch (Seasons 1–2), born Michelle Lisa Janco Puccio, is a promoter, socialite and DJ. She rose to fame as the wife of high-profile Miami Beach nightlife impresario Tommy "Pooch" Puccio, who she has since separated. The former couple share a daughter, Annabella, born in 2006. During the first season, Michelle enjoys a professional rivalry with Prince, the two facing off at several events. She also appears as a friend and confidante to Malik, Shay and Liz. She appears in a minor supporting role in season two, supporting Shay through her health scare.
- Malik Williams (Season 1) is Jeffrey's ex-boyfriend. He is a brand ambassador, socialite and stylist. In the first season, he is closeted but his feelings for Jeffrey make it difficult for him to maintain his heterosexual facade. He comes out and the two begin an affair, igniting an intense feud between Malik and Jeffrey's boyfriend Bobby. Malik dumps Jeffrey onstage at the reunion.
- Liz Cifuentes (Seasons 1–2) is Prince's girlfriend. She is a socialite and bartender. She was born in Miami Lakes, Florida. The first season chronicles her volatile relationship with Prince, who she has been dating for three and a half years. She also develops a friendship with Shay and Michelle Pooch. Midway through the season, she and Prince break up, and at the reunion, she is devastated to discover that he cheated on her with Gabby. In season two, she rekindles her relationship with Prince, igniting a feud with Bobby and Miami Tip.
- Steph Lecor (Season 1) is a Haitian-American pop singer. She is signed to We the Best Music Group under the mentorship of DJ Khaled. She appears as Amara and Veronica's friend and confidante in the first season, and while she tries to stay neutral in their feud, it soon backfires and she is forced to choose sides.
- Juju C. (Season 1) is an Afro-Latina author, entrepreneur and social media personality. She known in the public eye for her ten-year relationship with rapper Cam'ron, which ended in 2017. She first appeared in the franchise on Love & Hip Hop: New York. Juju appears in a minor supporting role in one episode of the first season, and attends its reunion. She appears as Amara's friend and supporter, who attempts to educate Young Hollywood by sharing her experiences with colorism and eurocentrism within the Latin community as an Afro-Latina woman.
- Lil Scrappy (Season 1) is Shay's former "friend-with-benefits". He is a rapper, originally from Atlanta, Georgia. He is the self-professed "Prince of the South" and first appeared in the franchise on Love & Hip Hop: Atlanta as one of the show's original cast members. He had a casual fling with Shay on the first two seasons on the show, however they had a falling out after he refused to claim their relationship as anything more than casual sex. Scrappy appears in a minor supporting role in the first season, which chronicles his move to Miami. He reunites with Shay and attempts to pick up where they left off. He does not attend the reunion and it is revealed that he has since gone back to Atlanta and married his ex-girlfriend Bambi. He returns briefly in the 2021 special Inside the 305.
- Chinese Nicky (Season 1, guest star in season 2), born Nikhol Hing, is Keyara's friend and confidante, and mother of Chinese Kitty. She is an entrepreneur, brand ambassador and socialite of paternal Chinese descent and maternal Afro-Guyanese descent, originally from Brooklyn, New York City. Midway through the season, she gets involved in a brawl with Shay while trying to defend her daughter. She returns in a guest role in season two.
- Chinese Kitty (Seasons 1–2), born Taylor Hing, is Gabby's friend, and daughter of Chinese Nicky. She is a Chinese-Guyanese rapper, originally from Queens, New York City. In the first season, she is caught in the crossfire in an altercation between Gabby and Shay, and her mother gets involved trying to defend her. She later attempts to work with Scrappy to try and kickstart her music career, intensifying her feud with Shay. In season two, she supports Jessie Woo through her struggles and opens up about her own painful past, including an incident in which she was date raped at an industry party.
- Faride Nemer (Season 1, guest star in season 2), is Jojo's mother. She appears in a minor supporting role in the first season, which chronicles her bitter divorce with ex-husband Antonio. She returns in a guest role in season two.
- Baby Blue Whoaaaa (Seasons 1–2), born Diamond Blue Smith, is a member of the group Pretty Ricky. His brother is his fellow group mate Spectacular. Slick 'Em is their cousin. The first season chronicles the group's return to music, as well as his tensions with P's girlfriend Shay. Season two chronicles the family tension between Spectacular and his father Big Blue, who managed the group. Baby Blue was included as a cast member in the press release for season three and even had an updated cast bio on VH1's website, however ultimately did not appear.

=== Season 2 additions ===
- Jessie Woo (Season 2), born Jessica Juste, is a Haitian-American comedienne, media personality and singer originally from Montreal, Canada. She was raised in Miami since the age of six. She became a viral sensation on social media through her comedic alter ego, Cadouskha Jean-Francois, which lead to a stint as a red carpet host for BET. Season two chronicles her attempts to launch a music career. During the season, she comes into conflict with Amara and Jojo after she accuses Amara of flirting with her ex-boyfriend and stealing her talk show idea. Later, she opens up about her darker experiences working in the industry, including being raped by a music producer.
- Spectacular Smith (Season 2, guest star in season 1), is a member of the group Pretty Ricky. His brother is his fellow group mate Baby Blue Whoaaaa while Slick 'Em is their cousin. After the group dissolved, he founded a multi-million dollar company which manages and monetises the social media pages of high-profile rappers. He appears as a guest star in the first season, before joining the supporting cast in season two, which delves into his strained relationship with his father, Big Blue. Spectacular was included as a cast member in the press release for season three, however ultimately did not appear. He also appears in a guest role in season six of Love & Hip Hop: Hollywood, while on tour with B2K members Lil' Fizz and J-Boog.
- Khaotic (Season 2, guest star in season 3), born Rubin Carlton McFadden, is a rapper. On March 6, 2010, he survived being shot 17 times in a gang-related ambush. On June 5, 2017, he was shot again in a drive-by shooting. Season two chronicles his legal issues after being involved in a hit-and-run incident during filming. During the season, he expresses romantic interest in Joy and later Liz, which sparks a feud between him and Prince. He returns in a guest role in season three, where he is seen in a flirtatious "situationship" with Sukihana.

=== Season 3 additions ===
- Nikki Natural (Season 3), born Neisha Alicia Cooper, is a rapper and model. Nikki joins the supporting cast in season three as Trick Daddy's new girlfriend. The two break up after she clashes repeatedly with Trina, as well as his ex-wife Joy. Later, she gets into a violent brawl with Hood Brat, Sukihana and KaMillion, after a "boot camp" rehearsal for female rappers goes left.
- Emjay Johnson (Seasons 3–4), born Marcus Johnson, is Shay's brother. He is a bachata singer who has toured with Romeo Santos. Season three chronicles his relationship struggles with Amara La Negra.

=== Season 4 additions ===
- Ray J (Season 4, guest star in season 2) is a R&B singer, actor, record producer and tech entrepreneur. He appeared previously on Love & Hip Hop: Hollywood, and in season two as a guest star.
- Gaelle Jacques (Season 4) is Florence's sister.
- Kill Bill (Season 4) is Sukihana's fiancé.
- Raymond Taylor (Season 4, guest star in seasons 1–3), also credited as Ray, is Trina's boyfriend and later fiancé.
- Princess Love (Season 4) is Ray J's wife. She previously appeared on Love & Hip Hop: Hollywood.
- C.O. Piscapo (Season 4, guest star in season 3), born Corey Evans, is Trina's road manager.
- Marlon Dure (Season 4) is Florence's husband.
- Isaiah Henderson (Season 4) is Sukihana's cousin.
- One Snoop Monzta (Season 4) is Trina's brother.
- Momma Dee (Season 4) is Lil Scrappy's mother. She previously appeared on Love & Hip Hop: Atlanta.
- Jay Kelly (Season 4) is Sukihana's manager.
- Jullian Boothe (Season 4, guest star in seasons 2–3) is Shay's business partner, and former manager of Amara, Trina, Pleasure P and Michelle Pooch.
- Sandra Sims (Season 4) is Shay and Emjay's mother.

== Guest stars ==
Several members of the cast's inner circle appear as recurring guest stars. They include:

Introduced in season 1

- Simply Jess, a Miami promoter and friend to Amara and Michelle Pooch
- Slick 'Em, member of the group Pretty Ricky
- Alvin Kelly, Trina's assistant and Bobby's rival
- DJ E-Feezy, DJ, record producer and Prince's friend
- Skrawberry, Miami Tip's friend and fellow stripper at infamous Miami strip club The King of Diamonds
- Dawn Heflin, Trick Daddy's manager and former Love & Hip Hop: Atlanta cast member, friend of Joy and Shay
- Stefi Chacon, radio personality
- Bryant McKinnie, ex-NFL star and friend to Prince, Chinese Nicky, Chinese Kitty and Scrappy
- Antonio Zarur, businessman and Jojo's father
- Supa Cindy, radio personality

Introduced in season 2

- Big Blue, Spectacular and Baby Blue's estranged father and former manager

Introduced in season 3

- KaMillion, rapper, friend to Hood Brat and Sukihana, joins them on their tour
- Saucy Santana, openly gay rapper, social media personality, friend to Sukihana
- Kenny Nwankwo, Hood Brat's boyfriend

The show also features minor appearances from notable figures within the hip hop industry and Miami's social scene, including Fuego, Ace Hood, T-Pain, Brandon Marshall, Ricardo Louis, Kenyan Drake, Nathaniel Clyne, Irv Gotti, Rico Love, Polow Da Don, Rick Ross, Dreezy, Miss Mulatto, Molly Brazy, Love & Hip Hop: Hollywood's Ray J and Lil Fizz, Alvin Kamara, MC Ceja, Bigg D, Lamb, N.O.R.E., DJ EFN, Tarana Burke, O. J. McDuffie, Ñejo, B.o.B. and Kent Jones.

Nina Parker hosted the first and second season's reunion specials. Claudia Jordan hosted season three's reunion, while Tamar Braxton hosted season four's reunion.
