= Love & Hip Hop: Miami season 2 =

Love & Hip Hop: Miami
- Season 2
- Cover used by the iTunes Store
- Starring: Trina; Prince; Amara La Negra; Shay Johnson; Gunplay; Veronica Vega; Bobby Lytes; Jojo Zarur; Trick Daddy
- No. of episodes: 14

Release
- Original network: VH1
- Original release: January 2 – March 25, 2019

Season chronology
- ← Previous; Season 1 Next → Season 3

The second season of the reality television series Love & Hip Hop: Miami will aired on VH1 from January 2, 2019 until March 25, 2019. The show was primarily filmed in Miami, Florida. It is executive produced by Mona Scott-Young and Stephanie R. Gayle and co-executive produced by Maricarmen Lopez for Monami Entertainment, Toby Barraud, Stefan Springman, David DiGangi, Dave Patry, Rich Allen and Thomas Jaeger for Eastern TV, and Nina L. Diaz, Liz Fine, Vivian Gomez and Jihoon Zun for VH1.

The series chronicles the lives of several women and men in the Miami area, involved in hip hop music. It consists of 14 episodes, including a two-part reunion special hosted by Nina Parker.

== Production ==
Season two of Love & Hip Hop: Miami began filming in June 2018. On September 6, 2018, Khaotic made headlines after he was allegedly involved in a hit-and-run incident while filming the show.

On November 19, 2018, VH1 announced Love & Hip Hop: Miami would return for a second season on January 2, 2019, and air on Wednesday nights. Nearly all of the show's cast would return for a second season, with Jojo promoted to the main cast. New supporting cast members would include Haitian-American comedienne Jessie Woo, rapper Khaotic and Spectacular of Pretty Ricky. On December 18, 2018, VH1 began releasing "playback" interviews with Trina, Amara, Trick Daddy, Gunplay and Bobby, discussing their most dramatic moments from the first season, as well as their newfound fame from the show. On December 20, 2018, VH1 released the season's super trailer.

The season would be accompanied by an official podcast, Love & Hip Hop: The Tea, hosted by Jesse Janedy, TK Trinidad and Lem Gonsalves.

=== Reception ===
The show struggled with ratings compared to other Love & Hip Hop incarnations, which was attributed to its confusing scheduling changes. The season aired on Wednesday nights at 8pm/7c for the first two episodes, before being moved to 10pm/9c after Black Ink Crew: Chicago. After three weeks of low ratings, the show was moved back to Monday nights at 9pm/8c after Love & Hip Hop: New York.

== Cast ==
=== Starring ===
- Trina (11 episodes)
- Prince (12 episodes)
- Amara La Negra (12 episodes)
- Shay Johnson (10 episodes)
- Gunplay (10 episodes)
- Veronica Vega (8 episodes)
- Bobby Lytes (13 episodes)
- Jojo Zarur (12 episodes)
- Trick Daddy (10 episodes)

=== Also starring ===
- Young Hollywood (11 episodes)
- Jessie Woo (10 episodes)
- Miami Tip (13 episodes)
- Joy Young (9 episodes)
- Keyara Stone (8 episodes)
- Spectacular (8 episodes)
- Khaotic (13 episodes)
- Pleasure P (10 episodes)
- Baby Blue Whoaaaa (9 episodes)
- Michelle Pooch (7 episodes)
- Chinese Kitty (4 episodes)
- Liz Cifuentes (6 episodes)

Mami Ana, Faride Nemer and Chinese Nicky return in guest roles. Jullian Boothe and Ray Taylor appear in several episodes as guest stars. The show features minor appearances from notable figures within the hip hop industry and Miami's social scene, including Dreezy, Miss Mulatto, Rico Love, Slick 'Em of Pretty Ricky, Polow da Don, Alvin Kamara, radio personality Supa Cindy, MC Ceja, Trina's assistant Alvin, Bigg D, Lamb and Baby Blue and Spectacular's father Big Blue. Love & Hip Hop: Hollywood's Ray J and Lil Fizz make crossover appearances.

== Episodes ==
| No. overall | No. in season | Title | Original release date | US viewers (millions) |
|---|---|---|---|---|
| 13 | 1 | "Take It to the House" | January 2, 2019 | 1.09 |
Rumors swirl around Amara as her career begins to take off. Gunplay tries to talk things out with Keyara after he is caught messaging other women. Jessie Woo arrives in Miami. Trina loses her temper during a performance with Trick. guest stars: Dreezy (artist), Molly Brazy (artist), Miss Mulatto (artist), Rico Love (music producer), Jullian Boothe (Amara's manager), Mama Woo (Jessie's mom), Chase (Prince's dad), Mami Ana, Khaotic, Samson (engineer), Reggie (A&R, RMG), Maria (Miami Tip's mother), Faride (Jojo's mother) cameo: Alvin Jojo is added to the opening credits. Jessie Woo joins the supporting cast. Although credited, Shay and Veronica Vega do not appear.
| 14 | 2 | "Family Matters" | January 9, 2019 | 0.87 |
Spectacular tries to resolve his lingering issues with his fellow Pretty Ricky group members. Jojo pulls up on Prince. Trina quits the TNT project. Jessie throws a bottle at Amara during a heated confrontation. guest stars: Jayden (Trick's son), Ray J, Fizz, Nikki (Khaotic's sister), Ray (Trina's boyfriend), Jonie (Jessie's sister), Spec Jr. (Spec's son), Special (Spec's brother), Jamee (Spec's fiancée), Mama Blue, Slick 'Em Spectacular and Khaotic join the supporting cast. Although credited, Shay and Veronica Vega do not appear.
| 15 | 3 | "Familiar Feuds" | January 16, 2019 | 0.84 |
Jojo and Pleasure P's romance blossoms. Shay tries to mend things with Trina and Joy. Veronica opens up to her family about her career struggles. guest stars: Ray (Trina's boyfriend), Deeloeso (tattoo artist), Melanie S. (financial advisor), By'anca (A&R), Polow da Don (music producer), Alvin Kamara (New Orleans Saints), Faride, Angela (Vega's grandmother), Gia (Vega's sister) Although credited, Amara La Negra and Trick Daddy do not appear.
| 16 | 4 | "Nada, Nada Empanada" | January 23, 2019 | 0.82 |
Trina fires Alvin. Young Hollywood and Amara reunite. Jessie gets a reality check in the studio when she tries to get a single off the ground. Shay and Jojo come to blows. guest stars: DJ Entice (radio personality), Supa Cindy (radio personality), Sincere (Tip's son), Maria (Tip's mother), KD (Trina's management), Elle Barksdale (CEO, GoodWoman), Mami Ana (Amara's mother), MC Ceja, Heaven (stylist), Reggie (A&R, RMG), Jullian Boothe (Trina's management), Alvin (Trina's assistant), Bigg D (music producer), Lamb (music producer) Although credited, Prince, Gunplay, Veronica Vega and Trick Daddy do not appear.
| 17 | 5 | "Girl Talk" | January 30, 2019 | 0.95 |
Jojo confronts Pleasure over his feelings for Shay. Amara explodes during another confrontation with Jessie. Baby Blue and Spectacular threaten each other during a meeting with their father. guest stars: Stefi Chacon (radio personality), Charissa (owner, Sugar Factory), Mami Ana (Amara's mother), Jullian Boothe (Amara's manager), Mami Lytes (Bobby's mother), Big Blue, N.O.R.E., DJ EFN (co-host), Slick 'Em Although credited, Gunplay does not appear.
| 18 | 6 | "Family Treason" | February 4, 2019 | 1.07 |
Spectacular makes amends with Baby Blue and his father. Bobby gets violent with Prince at Miami Tip's event. Trina cuts ties with Bobby after discovering he has signed with another label. Khaotic attempts to woo Joy. guest stars: Slick 'Em, Big Blue, Chase (Prince's dad), Liz, Chinese Nicky, Chief Pound (recording artist), Unk (Khaotic's uncle) cameo: Ray Although credited, Amara La Negra, Shay, Veronica Vega, Jojo and Trick Daddy do not appear.
| 19 | 7 | "Me Too" | February 11, 2019 | 1.11 |
Keyara confronts Amara at Gunplay's listening party. Joy struggles for financial independence away from Trick. Jessie opens up about her sexual assault. guest stars: Papa Keith (radio personality), Ann (Keyara's mom), Cece (Keyara's sister), Dee (Joy's brother), Sue-Ann Robinson Esq. (business attorney), Tarana Burke (founder, MeToo), Marcia Olivo (Miami Worker Center) Although credited, Prince, Shay, Veronica Vega and Bobby Lytes do not appear.
| 20 | 8 | "To Serve and Protect" | February 18, 2019 | 1.10 |
Khaotic gets in trouble with the law. Pleasure has second thoughts about his reunion with Pretty Ricky. Bobby attempts to mend things with his friends but gets into another altercation with Prince. Amara confronts Jojo about her friendship with Bobby and tells her to pick sides. guest stars: Demi Dorsey (Vega's stylist), Luis (Vega's dad), Faride, Gary (Pleasure's dad), Faye (Khaotic's mom), Nikki (Khaotic's sister), Que (Khaotic's niece) Although credited, Trina, Gunplay and Trick Daddy do not appear.
| 21 | 9 | "Petty Hurts" | February 25, 2019 | 1.04 |
Amara severs her friendship with Jojo for good after a dramatic confrontation with Bobby. Trick challenges Khaotic to a cook off, where Veronica and Jojo come face to face. guest stars: Ron (manager), Seth Levit (Host, The Fish Tank), O. J. McDuffie (former NFL player), Sharita (Spec's ex), Makhiari (Spec's son), Stefi Chacon (radio personality) Although credited, Trina does not appear.
| 22 | 10 | "Performance Anxiety" | March 4, 2019 | 1.00 |
After Shay snatches her wig at the cook off, Jojo blames her recent bad luck on Amara and goes to Mexico for a spiritual cleanse. Prince performs his music live for the first time, where Amara and Veronica bury the hatchet. Khaotic and his dad have an emotional reunion. guest stars: DJ Nasty (radio personality), DJ Lucky C (radio personality), Radio Big Mack (radio personality), Mami Ana (Amara's mother), Faride, Ñejo (reggaeton artist), Stefi Chacon (radio personality), DJ Lyve, Roy (Khaotic's dad) Although credited, Trina does not appear.
| 23 | 11 | "Rockstarrs and Reflections" | March 11, 2019 | 1.12 |
Khaotic goes to court; Bobby shows up at Trina's Rockstarr Music Group showcase. Shay deals with a serious medical issue. The cast come together at a vigil to discuss their experiences with gun violence. guest stars: Que (Khaotic's niece), Joe Klock (Khaotic's lawyer), Dr. Joan Alvarez (OBGYN), Dr. Joe Johnson (Shay's brother), Suzie Soprano, Dee Goodson, Nia Amber, Bigg D (music producer), Lamb (music producer), Jullian Boothe (Trina's management), Dr. Sajid Lopez (psychiatrist), Ray, Snoop (Trina's brother), Mari (producer) Although credited, Gunplay, Veronica Vega and Jojo do not appear.
| 24 | 12 | "Ready, Set, Release" | March 18, 2019 | 1.06 |
Trina launches her solo album. Pleasure shows up to Spectacular's bachelor party. Prince confronts Khaotic over his comments about Liz. guest stars: Buddy Roe (Trick's friend), Angela (Vega's grandmother), Luis (Vega's dad), Beatriz (Vega's dad's girlfriend), Ray, B.o.B, Kent Jones (music producer) cameo: Que, Joe Klock, Mami Ana, Chase
| 25 | 13 | "Reunion – Part 1" | March 18, 2019 | 1.12 |
Amara and Jessie discuss their feud. Bobby confronts Jullian. Pleasure P, Spectacular and Baby Blue clear the air. Trina unleashes on Trick. host: Nina Parker guest stars: Jullian
| 26 | 14 | "Reunion – Part 2" | March 25, 2019 | 1.53 |
Khaotic and Prince duke it out over Liz. The cast confront Jojo. Bobby and Prince open up about their intense friendship. host: Nina Parker

== Webisodes ==
=== Check Yourself ===
Love & Hip Hop Miami: Check Yourself, which features the cast's reactions to each episode, was released weekly with every episode on digital platforms.

List of Love & Hip Hop Miami: Check Yourself Season 2 episodes

| Episode | Title | Featured cast members | Ref |
|---|---|---|---|
| 1 | "Jessie Woo's Sister Talk & Trina's Blow-Up" | Jojo, Jessie Woo, Khaotic, Miami Tip, Trick Daddy, Veronica Vega, Joy | |
| 2 | "Prince Pops Off & Jessie Woo Questions Amara" | Prince, Jessie Woo, Bobby Lytes, Miami Tip, Amara La Negra, Veronica Vega | |
| 3 | "Khaotic's Realness & Trina's Meeting" | Khaotic, Jessie Woo, Miami Tip, Trick Daddy, Bobby Lytes, Shay, Joy | |
| 4 | "Trina Shakes Up Her Team & Empanadas Go Flying" | Jessie Woo, Trick Daddy, Amara La Negra, Shay, Baby Blue Whoaaaa | |
| 5 | "Pleasure P Calls It Quits & Truth on Podcasts" | Bobby Lytes, Joy, Shay, Baby Blue Whoaaaa, Veronica Vega, Jessie Woo, Miami Tip | |
| 6 | "Joy's Khaotic Dinner Date & Bobby's Messy Session with Trina" | Khaotic, Joy, Jessie Woo, Prince, Miami Tip, Trick Daddy | |
| 7 | "Keyara Confronts Amara La Negra and Gunplay Gets Grilled" | Shay, Young Hollywood, Gunplay, Bobby Lytes | |
| 8 | "Prince Gets Called Out & Bobby Goes in on Amara" | Prince, Baby Blue Whoaaaa, Spectacular, Bobby Lytes | |
| 9 | "Brotherly Love & Trick's Challenge" | Bobby Lytes, Baby Blue Whoaaaa, Spectacular, Prince, Young Hollywood, Khaotic | |
| 10 | "Trick's Cook-Off Gets Spicy & Amara Goes Horseback Riding" | Gunplay, Prince, Amara La Negra, Khaotic | |
| 11 | "Trina's Eventful Showcase & Khaotic's Push for Awareness" | Joy, Pleasure P, Bobby Lytes | |
| 12 | "Pretty Ricky's Problems & Spectacular's Bachelor Party" | Amara La Negra, Veronica Vega, Young Hollywood | |

=== Bonus scenes ===
Deleted and extended scenes from the season's episodes were released weekly as bonus content on VH1's official website.

List of Love & Hip Hop: Miami Season 2 bonus scenes

| Episode | Title | Featured cast members | Ref |
|---|---|---|---|
| 1 | "Keyara Has Had Enough" | Keyara, Miami Tip, Joy | |
| 2 | "Why Is Pretty Ricky Still on Pause?" | Spectacular, Pleasure P | |
| 3 | "Keyara Wants Gunplay to Fight for Her" | Keyara, Joy, Trina | |
| 4 | "Miami Tip's Mother Knows Best" | Miami Tip | |
| 5 | "Amara La Negra's Gift for Mami Ana" | Amara La Negra, Jojo, Mami Ana, Faride | |
| 6 | "Keyara Stone Doesn't Have Time for Gunplay" | Keyara, Chinese Kitty, Chinese Nicky, Miami Tip | |
| 7 | "Gunplay Makes Plans with Keyara's Family" | Keyara, Gunplay, Young Hollywood | |
| 8 | "The Fall That Changed Tip's Life" | Miami Tip, Bobby Lytes | |
| 9 | "Papii SHAM Poo's Birthday Party" | Prince, Liz, Veronica Vega, Young Hollywood | |
| 10 | "Is This a Date?" (Extended scene) | Amara La Negra, Trick Daddy, Mami Ana | |
| 11 | "Trick Daddy's Words to Live By" | Trick Daddy | |
| 12 | "Shopping with Trick" | Trick Daddy | |

== Music ==
Several cast members had their music featured on the show and released singles to coincide with the airing of the episodes.

List of songs performed and/or featured in Love & Hip Hop: Miami season two
| Title | Performer | Album | Episode(s) | Notes | Ref |
|---|---|---|---|---|---|
| Rainy Day | Khaotic | single | 2 | performed onstage | |
| Tu Me Enamoraste | Young Hollywood | single | 4 | played in party | |
| LadyLike | Jessie Woo | single | 4 | performed in studio | |
| Bang Bang | Bobby Lytes | single | 5 | played in music video | |
| Understanding | Amara La Negra | Unstoppable | 9 | performed onstage | |
| Bust a Whine (feat. Amara La Negra) | Pleasure P | single | 12 | performed in music video | |
| New Thang (feat. 2 Chainz) | Trina | The One | 12 | performed in music video | |
