= Love & Hip Hop: Miami season 4 =

Season of television series

Love & Hip Hop: Miami
- Season 4
- Cover used by the iTunes Store
- Starring: Amara La Negra; Trick Daddy; Sukihana; Florence El Luche; Ace Hood & Shelah Marie; Noreaga & Neri; Trina
- No. of episodes: 25

Release
- Original network: VH1
- Original release: August 23, 2021 – October 17, 2022

Season chronology
- ← Previous; Season 3

The fourth season of the reality television series Love & Hip Hop: Miami first aired on VH1 from August 23, 2021 until October 17, 2022. The show was primarily filmed in Miami, Florida. It is executive produced by Mona Scott-Young and Stephanie R. Gayle for Monami Productions and Lashan Browning, Donna Edge-Rachell, Paris Bauldwin, Daniel Wiener, Brian Schornak, Eric Cyphers and Markus Burns for New Group Productions. Sitarah Pendelton and Phakiso Collins are executive producers for VH1.

The series chronicles the lives of several women and men in the Miami area, involved in hip hop music. It consists of 25 episodes, including a reunion special hosted by Tamar Braxton.

== Production ==
Filming for season four of Love & Hip Hop: Miami began in May 2021. The show made headlines in June 2021, when Ace Hood's baby mama Shanice Tyria, outed him as a cast member on the show during a dispute over child support payments.

On August 9, 2021, after over a year long hiatus, VH1 announced the show's return for a fourth season, which premiered on August 23, 2021. New cast members include Ace Hood and his wife Shelah Marie, Noreaga and his wife Neri, and Florence El Luche, with Bobby Lytes demoted to supporting cast, along with Florence's sister Gaelle and husband Marlon, Suki's fiancé Kill Bill and cousin Isaiah, Trina's boyfriend Raymond Taylor and manager C.O. Love & Hip Hop: Hollywood's Ray J and Princess Love make crossover appearances.

The season was preceded by the special Love & Hip Hop Miami: Inside the 305 on August 16, 2021.

On July 11, 2022, VH1 announced that additional episodes will air from August 8, 2022. Ace and Shelah were removed from the opening credits, while Shay Johnson and her brother Emjay returned to the cast, with Trina's brother Snoop, Suki's manager Jay Kelly, Shay's business partner Jullian Boothe and Shay and Emjay's mother Sandra Sims in supporting roles. Love & Hip Hop: Atlanta's Momma Dee makes a crossover appearance.

== Synopsis ==
In this era, Miami is the moment. Welcome to the center of the world. Its the hottest of the hot spots, a musical melting pot and ground zero for hip hop culture. Down here, it's all about momentum. But in a city that's all about the new, it only takes a moment to lose everything. The moment starts now. Y'all in the 305.

— Noreaga, opening monologue

== Cast ==
=== Part 1 ===
Starring

- Amara La Negra (9 episodes)
- Trick Daddy (7 episodes)
- Sukihana (9 episodes)
- Florence El Luche (7 episodes)
- Ace Hood (10 episodes)
- Shelah Marie (11 episodes)
- Noreaga (7 episodes)
- Neri Santiago (7 episodes)
- Trina (11 episodes)

Also starring

- Joy Young (8 episodes)
- Ray J (4 episodes)
- Gaelle Jacques (6 episodes)
- Kill Bill (8 episodes)
- Bobby Lytes (9 episodes)
- Raymond Taylor (8 episodes)
- Miami Tip (3 episodes)
- Princess Love (5 episodes)
- C.O. Piscapo (6 episodes)
- Marlon Dure (7 episodes)
- Isaiah Henderson (4 episodes)

=== Part 2 ===
Starring

- Amara La Negra (10 episodes)
- Trick Daddy (9 episode)
- Sukihana (10 episodes)
- Florence El Luche (11 episodes)
- Noreaga (5 episodes)
- Neri Santiago (3 episodes)
- Trina (9 episodes)

Also starring

- Joy Young (7 episodes)
- Princess Love (6 episodes)
- Bobby Lytes (6 episodes)
- One Snoop Monzta (6 episodes)
- Raymond Taylor (6 episodes)
- Marlon Dure (9 episodes)
- Gaelle Jacques (9 episodes)
- Emjay Johnson (7 episodes)
- Shay Johnson (9 episodes)
- Isaiah Henderson (4 episodes)
- Kill Bill (9 episodes)
- Momma Dee (3 episodes)
- Ray J (6 episodes)
- Jay Kelly (3 episodes)
- Jullian Boothe (5 episodes)
- Sandra Sims (8 episodes)

DJ EFN, Timbaland, Swizz Beatz, LunchMoney Lewis and Amara's mother Mami Ana appear in guest roles. Love & Hip Hop: Atlanta's Yung Joc and Spice, and Love & Hip Hop: New York's Kaylin Garcia make crossover appearances.

== Episodes ==
No. overall	No. in season	Title	Original release date	US viewers (millions)
Part 1
41	1	"Miami is the Moment"	August 23, 2021	0.61
Trina celebrates the anniversary of her debut album in Atlanta. Noreaga gets advice from his friends on his relationship. Ace Hood reconnects with his mother. Sukihana clashes with her "momager". guest stars: Raymond (Trina's boyfriend), Snoop (Trina's brother), Bobby Lytes, Krystle (Trina's friend), DJ EFN, Timbaland, Swizz Beatz, Suki's kids, Kill Bill, LunchMoney Lewis (producer), DJ Nasty 305, Radio Big Mack, CO and KD (Trina's managers), Mr. Lee, Yung Reallie and Sunny D (N.O.R.E.'s friends), Noah and Nahki (N.O.R.E. & Neri's sons), Slim Diesel (rapper), Blondy (Ace's mom), Lori (Suki's manager) cameo: Yung Joc, Spice Florence El Luche, Ace Hood, Shelah Marie, Noreaga and Neri are added the opening credits, replacing departing cast members Shay Johnson, PreMadonna, Hood Brat, Brisco, Joseline, and Bobby Lytes, who returns in a supporting role. Although credited, Amara and Florence do not appear.
42	2	"Island Time"	August 30, 2021	0.63
Amara considers moving to the Dominican Republic for her new man and Mami Ana is feeling hesitant. Sukihana works on her store. Trina mourns her brother. Shelah opens up about her anxiety. guest stars: Mami Ana (Amara's mother), Allan (Amara's boyfriend), Isaiah (Suki's cousin), Aisha (Shelah's friend), Radio Big Mack, Markus Burns (executive producer, Love & Hip Hop), Kill Bill (Suki's fiance), Lori (Suki's momager), Snoop (Trina's brother), Judayah (Snoop's daughter), Raymond (Trina's boyfriend), Wilbert and Paris (Goonk's son and daughter), Blondy (Ace's mother), Anita (Shelah's stepmom), Robert (Shelah's dad), CO (Trina's manager), Lauren (event coordinator), Mr. W. Imara Canady (AIDS Healthcare Foundation); Although credited, Florence, Noreaga and Neri do not appear.
43	3	"Thicker Than Water"	September 6, 2021	0.57
Amara and Mami Ana clash over her relationship with Allan. Florence suspects her husband of hiding something. Shelah sits down with her mom. Ray J and Princess arrive in Miami. guest stars: Allan (Amara's boyfriend), Mami Ana (Amara's mom), Marlon (Florence's husband), Gaelle (Florence's sister), Noah & Nahki (N.O.R.E & Neri's children), Wanda (L'Union Suite blog), Princess, Pino (Florence's son), Akeem and Xavier (Florence's sons), Linda (Shelah's mom); Ray J joins the supporting cast. Although credited, Trick Daddy, Sukihana and Trina do not appear.
44	4	"Keep It Nasty"	September 13, 2021	0.65
Florence's sister Gaelle exposes Florence's husband. Sukihana gets arrested. Bobby stirs the pot between Joy and Trick when Joy brings her new man to an event. Amara's mother gets physical with her father. guest stars: Marlon (Florence's husband), Sapphire and Tina (Suki's friends), Mami Ana (Amara's mom), Daniel (Amara's father), Jacky (Florence's cousin), David (Joy's boyfriend), Michael Benjamin AKA "MikaBen" (producer); Gaelle and Kill Bill join the supporting cast. Although credited, Ace Hood, Shelah and Neri do not appear.
45	5	"Banned in the M.I.A."	September 20, 2021	0.52
Sukihana deals with the backlash from her OnlyFans page. Florence confronts Marlon. Trina babysits. Amara tries to focus on music. guest stars: Xavier (Ace's nephew), Marlon (Florence's husband), Snoop (Trina's brother), Jamiee and Judayah (Snoop's wife and daughter), Tiffany (Shelah's sister), Denzel (Amara's engineer), Isaiah (Suki's cousin); Although credited, Trick Daddy, Noreaga and Neri do not appear.
46	6	"Tiger Queen"	September 27, 2021	0.51
Sukihana recruits Miami Tip for help with her video shoot. Florence has her store opening. Trina feels let down by her team at a photo shoot. Shelah is still struggling with her mental health, frustrating Ace. guest stars: J Kelly (Suki's road manager), CO (Trina's manager), Marie and Joyce (Florence's mom and sister), Marlon (Florence's husband), Melissa (Shelah's life coach), Damon Thomas (photographer), Jeremy Possman (tiger handler); Raymond joins the supporting cast. Although credited, Amara, Trick Daddy, Noreaga and Neri do not appear.
47	7	"Wrong Way"	October 4, 2021	0.44
Trina continues to have issues with Ray and her team. Ace meets with his mom and Shelah goes to Orlando. Amara's mother has a health scare. Sukihana and Kill Bill come to blows. guest stars: Lunch Money Lewis (producer), Slim Diesel (rapper), J Kelly (Suki's road manager), Jayla Young (rapper), CO and KD (Trina's managers), Sydni (Amara's stylist), Mami Ana (Amara's mother), Daniel (Amara's father), Blondy (Ace's mother), Toshiba (Ace's sister), Gio (Amara's friend); Although credited, Trick Daddy, Florence, Noreaga and Neri do not appear.
48	8	"The Harder They Fall"	October 11, 2021	0.38
Trina has a health scare. Bobby tries to resolve his family issues. Suki and Bill go to counselling. guest stars: Isaiah (Suki's cousin), Sapphire and Tina (Suki's friends), Eli (Suki's lawyer), Jayden (Trick's son), Markus Burns (executive producer, Love & Hip Hop), Sunny Malouf (singer/influencer), Snoop (Trina's brother), Lil 'Cease (rapper), Sunny D (N.O.R.E.'s friend), Elaine (Bobby's aunt), Kevin Adams (pastor); Although credited, Amara and Florence do not appear.
49	9	"Show Up and Show Out"	October 18, 2021	0.46
Princess walks in a fashion show. Trina clashes with her manager Co ahead of her Versuz performance. Florence gets physical with Marlon. Amara reveals she is pregnant. guest stars: Adam Saaks (designer), KD (Trina's manager), Debbie (Gaelle's friend), DJ Nasty 305, Mami Ana (Amara's mom); Princess, CO and Marlon join the supporting cast. Although credited, Sukihana does not appear.
50	10	"Line In the Sand"	October 25, 2021	0.37
Shelah offends Neri by excluding her from an event for not being black. Amara has a miscarriage. Trina opens up to a prophetess. guest stars: Slim Diesel (rapper), Epik and Melody (Ray J & Princess' son and daughter), Tasha (Shelah's business partner), Mami Ana, Daniel, Blondy (Ace's mother), Snoop (Trina's brother), Pastor Bentley; Although credited, Sukihana and Florence do not appear.
51	11	"Indecent Proposal"	November 1, 2021	0.38
Princess, Neri and Shelah continue to struggle to get on the same page. Joy tries to make up to Trina. Marlon comes clean to Florence. Bill and Suki reunite. guest stars: Tina and Sapphire (Suki’s friends), Joyce (Florence’s sister), Snoop (Trina’s brother), Myles (Bill’s brother), Mami Ana (Amara’s mother), Tori (reiki healer), Debbie (Gaelle’s friend), J Kelly (Suki’s road manager); Isaiah joins the supporting cast. Although credited, Trick Daddy, Ace Hood and Noreaga do not appear.
52	12	"Bottoms Up"	November 8, 2021	0.41
Trick stirs up controversy online. Florence and Marlon reconnect after tragic events in Haiti. Bobby reconnects with his father. Allan proposes to Amara. Raymond proposes to Trina. guest stars: DJ EFN (Drink Champs co-host), Jacky (Florence’s cousin), Allan (Amara’s boyfriend), Snoop (Trina’s brother), Elaine (Bobby’s aunt), KD (Trina’s manager), Mami Ana (Amara’s mother)
Part 2
53	13	"Make Some Noise"	August 8, 2022	0.72
Trina is on a national tour, where her fiance Raymond and brother Snoop clash. Amara is abandoned at her baby shower. Florence's sister confronts Florence and Marlon at their single release party. guest stars: CO and KD (Trina’s management), Tina (Suki’s friend), Haitian Princess (Bobby’s friend), Kaylin (Bobby’s friend), Ludas (Flo’s management), Joyce (Flo’s sister), Marie (Flo’s mom), Mami Ana, David (Joy’s boyfriend); Snoop joins the supporting cast. Although credited, Noreaga does not appear.
54	14	"Blessings and Curses"	August 15, 2022	0.51
Amara confronts Allan over the phone for missing her event. Shay returns and reveals she's pregnant. Sukihana fights with her cousin and fiancé. Florence does a voodoo ritual. guest stars: Mami Ana (Amara’s mother), Allan (Amara’s fiancé), Jullian (Shay’s friend/business partner), Betty (Flo’s management), Myles (Bill’s brother), Sandra (Shay & Emjay’s mom), Kelly (Suki’s manager), Dr. Brandi Johnson (Shay & Emjay’s sister-in-law), Joe Sr. (Shay & Emjay’s father), Dr. Joe Johnson (Shay & Emjay’s brother); Momma Dee joins the supporting cast. Although credited, Trick Daddy, Noreaga, Neri and Trina do not appear.
55	15	"Grab the Mic"	August 22, 2022	0.51
Florence's performance turns into a disaster. Bobby and Raymond attempt to squash the beef. Shay's family have a sit-down. guest stars: DJ Efn (‘’Drink Champs’’ co-host), Mami Ani (Amara’s mother), Evelyn (pregnancy caster), Geo (Amara’s best friend), Madam Moody, Felicity Princess, Shassy, Debbie (Gaelle’s friend), Sandra (Shay & Emjay’s mom), Chelle (Shay & Emjay’s aunt), Joe Sr. (Shay & Emjay’s father), Brandi (Shay & Emjay’s sister-in-law), Joe Jr. (Shay & Emjay’s brother), Sahara (Shay & Emjay’s cousin), Betty (Flo’s management), KD and CO (Trina’s management); Although credited, Trick Daddy, Sukihana and Neri do not appear.
56	16	"Stomping Grounds"	August 22, 2022	0.45
N.O.R.E. returns to his hometown. Ray J and Princess met up. Florence and Shassy go head to head. Sukihana helps Bill grieve his mother. guest stars: Betty and Ludas (Flo’s management), Domax St. Juste (Flo’s DJ), Cassie (Flo’s stylist), Nahki, Noah and Naseem (N.O.R.E. & Neri’s sons), Lil Cease (N.O.R.E.’s friend), Epik and Melody (Ray J & Princess’ son and daughter), Jason (Princess’ friend), Helena (Bill’s aunt), Capone, Tragedy, Shassy, Zee (Shassy’s manager), Endia, Mario (N.O.R.E.’s sister and brother); Although credited, Amara and Trina do not appear.
57	17	"Throw That Thang"	August 29, 2022	0.49
Sukihana and Trina perform. Ray J's name is in the tabloids again. Florence wants new management. guest stars: Victoria Santiago (N.O.R.E.’s mother), Sunny D (N.O.R.E.’s friend), Endia and Mario Santiago (N.O.R.E.’s sister and brother), Naseem, Noah and Nahki (N.O.R.E.’s sons), Betty and Ludas (Flo’s management), Dawn Heflin (artist manager), Lex (Suki’s backup dancer), CO (Trina’s management), Wack 100; Although credited, Amara and Trick Daddy do not appear.
58	18	"Secret Sauce"	September 5, 2022	0.55
Gaelle tries to come clean. Trina tries to help Joy with her divorce. guest stars: Lisaraye McCoy (Actress/director), DJ Envy (radio host & DJ), Jess Hilarious (comedian), CO (Trina’s management), David (Joy’s boyfriend), Bryan Ozun (real estate agent), Joyce and Jackie (Florence’s sister and cousin), Debbie (Gaelle’s friend), David Weintraub (Ray J’s manager), Natasha Mayne (attorney), Cassie Gilles (Florence’s stylist), Dawn Heflin (artist manager), Betty and Ludas (Flo’s management); Jay Kelly joins the supporting cast. Although credited, Amara, Sukihana, Noriega and Neri do not appear.
59	19	"A Thin Line Between Love & Haiti"	September 12, 2022	0.47
Gaelle confesses to sleeping with Marlon. Shay tries to reconnect with her mother. Amara prepares for the birth of her twins. guest stars: Joyce and Jackie (Florence’s sister and cousin), Dawn Heflin (artist manager), Sapphire (Suki’s friend), Mami Ani (Amara’s mother), Allan (Amara’s fiancé), Richy Jackson (creative director), Naya Shakira and Kay (Suki’s backup dancers), Sandra (Shay & Emjay’s mom); Although credited, Trick Daddy, Noriega, Neri and Trina do not appear.
60	20	"Nothing's Sacred"	September 19, 2022	0.57
Emjay and Jullian brawl at Shay's baby shower. Sukihana confronts her friends. Trick Daddy publicly embarrasses Joy. Amara gives birth. guest stars: Mami Ana (Amara’s mother), Allan (Amara’s fiance), CO (Trina’s management), DJ Envy, Charlamagne Tha God, Angela Yee, Louise Strouder (Joy’s mother), Geo (Amara’s best friend), Uncle Charlie (rapper), Poison Clan (hip hop group), Billy Blue (rapper), Mike Smiff (rapper), JT Money (rapper), Uncle Luke (2 Live Crew), Grind Mode (rapper), Tina, Sapphire (Suki’s friends), Heaven (Shay’s friend), Sandra (Shay & Emjay’s mom); Jullian joins the supporting cast. Although credited, Florence, Noriega and Neri do not appear.
61	21	"Return of the Hat"	September 26, 2022	0.44
Gaelle ruins another one of Florence's events. Shay and Sandra sit down with a mediator. Amara and Emjay cross paths. guest stars: CO (Trina’s management), Joe Sr., (Shay & Emjay’s dad), Dr. Shannon Clark (OBGYN), Dawn Heflin (artist manager), Gail Seay (constituent affairs), Nicole Ricca (clothing designer), Mami Ana (Amara’s mother), Siobhan Sudberry (mediator); Sandra joins the supporting cast. Although credited, Sukihana, Noriega and Neri do not appear.
62	22	"Bad Connection"	October 3, 2022	0.47
Trick takes Kill Bill under his wing. Emjay and Allan confront each other over zoom. Shay gives birth. guest stars: CO (Trina’s management), Allan (Amara’s fiance), Amber Evans (event coordinator), Joe (Emjay & Shay’s brother), Francis Suarez (mayor of Miami), Dr. Nosrati (surgeon), Camille (field producer); Although credited, Florence, Noriega and Neri do not appear.
63	23	"Deep Cuts"	October 10, 2022	0.42
Sukihana gets plastic surgery. Ray J and Florence make a sexy music video together. Amara sits down with Jullian. guest stars: Allan (Amara’s fiancé), Mami Ana, Joyce and Marie (Florence’s sister and mother), Frankie Cordero and Isis Richarson (health care consultants), Dr. Nosrati (surgeon), Ras Kev (director), DJ EFN (co-founder/host), Sunny D (N.O.R.E.’s friend), Ludas (Flo’s management); Although credited, Neri and Trina do not appear.
64	24	"Beyond Repair"	October 17, 2022	0.46
Fights break out at Sukihana's engagement party. Amara sits down with Shay. Ray J and Princess's marriage collapses. guest stars: Marie and Joyce (Florence’s mother and sister), CO (Trina’s management), Iyanla Vanzant (family therapist), Tina and Sapphire (Sukihana’s friends), Barbara Sweet (crime prevention specialist, City of Miami Police Department), Capone; Although credited, Neri does not appear.
65	25	"Reunion"	October 17, 2022	0.37
Gaelle and Florence reunite. Bill proposes to Sukihana. Shay and Amara mend their friendship. host: Tamar Braxton
