= Love & Hip Hop: Miami season 1 =

Love & Hip Hop: Miami
- Season 1
- Cover used by the iTunes Store
- Starring: Trina; Prince; Amara La Negra; Gunplay; Veronica Vega; Bobby Lytes; Shay Johnson; Trick Daddy
- No. of episodes: 12

Release
- Original network: VH1
- Original release: January 1 – March 19, 2018

Season chronology
- Next → Season 2

The first season of the reality television series Love & Hip Hop: Miami aired on VH1 from January 1, 2018 until March 19, 2018. The show was primarily filmed in Miami, Florida. It is executive produced by Mona Scott-Young and Stephanie R. Gayle and co-executive produced by Maricarmen Lopez for Monami Entertainment, Toby Barraud, Stefan Springman, Mala Chapple, David DiGangi, Rick de Oliveira, Gilda Brasch and Alissa Horowitz for Eastern TV, and Nina L. Diaz, Liz Fine and Vivian Gomez for VH1.

The series chronicles the lives of several women and men in the Miami area, involved in hip hop music. It consists of 12 episodes, including a two-part reunion special hosted by Nina Parker.

== Production ==
The first season title screen.

On February 28, 2016, it was reported that potential spin-offs set in Miami and Houston were in pre-production and the producers were auditioning potential cast members. In April 2016, Trick Daddy and Trina confirmed their involvement in Love & Hip Hop: Miami, despite the latter turning down the offer years earlier. On April 20, 2017, after over a year of development hell, it was reported that the show's producers had been granted permission to start filming in South Florida.

On August 25, 2017, VH1 announced Love & Hip Hop: Miami would make its series premiere in January 2018. The series would star Trina, Trick Daddy, Afro-Latina singer Amara La Negra, Gunplay, Cuban-Venezuelan rapper Veronica Vega, party promoter Prince, Love & Hip Hop: Atlanta's Shay Johnson and openly gay rapper Bobby Lytes, with stylist Jojo Zarur, Pleasure P, Baby Blue Whoaaaa, stripper-turned-rapper Miami Tip, producer Young Hollywood, DJ Michelle Pooch, Gunplay's girlfriend Keyara Stone, Trick Daddy's estranged wife Joy Young, JT Money's son Jeffrey White, stylist Malik Williams, Steph Lecor, Prince's girlfriend Liz Cifuentes, model Gabby Davis, socialite Chinese Kitty and her mother Chinese Nicky rounding out the supporting cast. Amara's mother Mami Ana and Jojo's mother Faride Nemer would appear in minor supporting roles, while Love & Hip Hop: New York's Juju C. and Love & Hip Hop: Atlanta's Lil Scrappy would make special crossover appearances.

On August 27, 2017, MTV aired an exclusive sneak peek of the show during the 2017 MTV Video Music Awards. On October 30, 2017, VH1 confirmed January 1, 2018 as the show's start date. This was followed by a series of teasers, including a cypher video, directed by Flex God Daps and featuring Trina, Trick Daddy, Veronica, Bobby, Amara and Gunplay performing in their distinct musical styles. On December 18, 2017, VH1 released a 5 minute "super" trailer, followed by "meet the cast" interviews with cast members Trina, Trick Daddy, Gunplay, Amara La Negra, Bobby Lytes, Veronica Vega, Prince, Shay Johnson, Jojo Zarur and "Sacrifice Vs. Paradise", where the cast discuss Miami's economic divide.

== Synopsis ==
When y'all talk about Miami, y'all talk about the sands and the yachts, the heat like y'all know it. You go on vacation, floss up and down Collins Ave, and you party at those clubs on that side of town. This ya boy Trick Daddy Dollars. And like I told y'all before, y'all don't know a motherfucking thing about Miami. What you know about slammin' dominoes in Little Havana? Selling conch salad in Liberty City? Or riding your donk up and down I-95? Y'all think y'all know all the hot spots? But the real fire is at Trick Daddy's spot. This is my 305. I don't know if they heard you Trick. South Beach may be lit, but the ballers with real ice party like me, the baddest bitch. The one and only diamond princess, Miami born and raised. Any clown can rent a Lamborghini, and any fake can pop tags, but only a real boss freezes out the haters and secures the bag. People say there's a lotta storms cookin' up in these parts. So as I say, let's get wet. 'Cause til then, Miami gonna continue to be the realest, the littest, and the hottest city in the world. Flight 305 to Miami, now boarding.

— Trick Daddy & Trina, opening monologue

== Cast ==
=== Starring ===
- Trina (10 episodes)
- Prince (9 episodes)
- Amara La Negra (10 episodes)
- Gunplay (9 episodes)
- Veronica Vega (10 episodes)
- Bobby Lytes (9 episodes)
- Shay Johnson (12 episodes)
- Trick Daddy (9 episodes)

=== Also starring ===
- Young Hollywood (10 episodes)
- Mami Ana (3 episodes)
- Keyara Stone (9 episodes)
- Pleasure P (9 episodes)
- Miami Tip (9 episodes)
- Joy Young (8 episodes)
- Gabby Davis (7 episodes)
- Jeffrey White (8 episodes)
- Michelle Pooch (8 episodes)
- Malik Williams (8 episodes)
- Jojo Zarur (8 episodes)
- Liz Cifuentes (6 episodes)
- Steph Lecor (10 episodes)
- Juju C. (3 episodes)
- Lil Scrappy (3 episodes)
- Chinese Nicky (8 episodes)
- Chinese Kitty (8 episodes)
- Faride Nemer (5 episodes)
- Baby Blue Whoaaaa (8 episodes)

Spectacular and Slick 'Em of Pretty Ricky, Trina's assistant Alvin Kelly, stripper Skrawberry, Love & Hip Hop: Atlanta's Dawn Heflin and Jojo's father Antonio Zarur appear as guest stars in several episodes. The show also features minor appearances from notable figures within the hip hop industry and Miami's social scene, including Simply Jess, DJ E-Feezy, Stefi Chacon, Fuego, Bryant McKinnie, Ace Hood, T-Pain, Brandon Marshall, Ricardo Louis, Kenyan Drake, Nathaniel Clyne, Brandon Richardson, Irv Gotti, Rico Love, Supa Cindy, Polow Da Don, Rick Ross and Slim Thug.

== Episodes ==
No. overall	No. in season	Title	Original release date	US viewers (millions)
1	1	"Welcome To Miami"	January 1, 2018	1.83
Amara La Negra is offended when producer Young Hollywood criticises her afro. Shay comes to Miami for her man, Pleasure P, and quickly clashes with his group mate Baby Blue. Trina's cousin Bobby can't get along with her assistant. guest stars: Simply Jess (promoter), Alvin (Trina's assistant), Spectacular, Slick 'Em, Baby Blue Whoaaaa Although credited, Prince does not appear.
2	2	"Forbidden Fruit"	January 8, 2018	1.67
Keyara confronts Gunplay's ex Miami Tip, but is surprised when Tip is interested in her instead. Trick Daddy's wife Joy shows up to his house, wanting to finalise their divorce. guest stars: DJ E-Feezy, Michelle Pooch, Steph Lecor, Skrawberry, Fuego, Stefi Chacon (radio personality), Chinese Nicky, Dawn Heflin Joy and Gabby join the supporting cast. Although credited, Bobby does not appear.
3	3	"Hey Stranger"	January 15, 2018	1.57
Veronica brings Amara and Young Hollywood together again, but they can't resolve their issues. Pleasure's ex Gabby attempts to rekindle things with Pleasure, but gets an ice cream cone to the face after she is discovered by Shay. guest stars: Baby Blue Whoaaaa, Spectacular, Simply Jess, Bryant McKinnie (former NFL player), Ace Hood (rapper), T-Pain (singer), Brandon Marshall (Denver Broncos LB), Antonio Zarur (Jojo's dad), Steph Lecor, Faride Nemer (Jojo's mom), Ricardo Louis (Cleveland Browns WR), Kenyan Drake (Miami Dolphins RB), DJ Affect (owner) Jeffrey, Michelle Pooch, Malik, Jojo and Liz join the supporting cast. Although credited, Trina, Gunplay, and Trick Daddy do not appear.
4	4	"Fashion Victims"	January 22, 2018	1.72
Veronica and Amara fall out over the Young Hollywood situation. At Prince's fashion event, Shay and Liz get into a fight with Gabby, Chinese Kitty and Chinese Nicky. guest stars: Baby Blue Whoaaaa, Spectacular, Skrawberry, Alvin (Trina's assistant), Chinese Kitty, Chinese Nicky Steph joins the supporting cast.
5	5	"Good Hair"	January 29, 2018	1.88
Amara explores different hairstyles in a photo shoot, in an attempt to educate Young Hollywood about his colorism. Bobby discovers Jeffrey is cheating on him with Malik, and reacts violently. guest stars: Chinese Kitty, Chinese Nicky, Simply Jess, Nathaniel Clyne (soccer player), Irv Gotti (Murder Inc. Records founder) Juju joins the supporting cast. Although credited, Trina, Gunplay, Veronica, and Trick Daddy do not appear.
6	6	"Saints & Sinners"	February 5, 2018	1.75
Veronica confronts Jojo for driving a wedge between her and Amara, and gets a glass of water thrown in her face. Gunplay relapses after the death of a friend. guest stars: Helen (Jeffrey's friend), Ebony (Jeffrey's friend), Dawn, Bryant McKinnie (former NFL player), Chinese Nicky, Chinese Kitty, Rico Love (songwriter/producer) Lil Scrappy joins the supporting cast. Although credited, Amara does not appear.
7	7	"I'm Done"	February 12, 2018	1.55
Young Hollywood reaches out to Amara to try and bury the hatchet. Trick Daddy hosts a divorce party to mock Joy. guest stars: Chronic (Trick's producer/engineer), Dawn, Stefi Chacon (radio personality), Skrawberry Chinese Nicky and Chinese Kitty join the supporting cast. Although credited, Prince and Bobby do not appear.
8	8	"Real Talk"	February 19, 2018	1.78
Jojo struggles to pick sides in her parents' divorce. Joy starts dating Pleasure. Amara and Veronica get physical at an industry event. guest stars: Vernessa (Trina's mom), Keon Hardemon (City of Miami commissioner), Polow Da Don (Zone 4, Inc. CEO), Raymond Taylor (Trina's friend), Rick Ross (recording artist and MMG CEO), Sam Sneak (MMG A&R and DJ), Antonio (Jojo's dad) Faride and Baby Blue Whoaaaa join the supporting cast. Although credited, Prince, Bobby and Trick Daddy do not appear.
9	9	"Crossroads"	February 26, 2018	1.64
Bobby bashes Trina in an interview, leading to a confrontation at his event. Malik demands Jeffrey end things with Bobby once and for all. guest stars: Bryant Mckinnie (former NFL player), Supa Cindy (radio personality), Simply Jess, DJ E-Feezy, Lila Nikole (swimsuit designer) Although credited, Amara, Gunplay and Veronica do not appear.
10	10	"TNT"	March 5, 2018	1.68
The cast come together at Trick and Trina's backyard barbecue. Amara and Jojo face off with Veronica, Young Hollywood and Steph Lecor. Malik and Bobby get into a heated argument. Shay snatches Joy's weave. guest stars: DJ Nasty (radio personality), Big Mack (radio personality), Spectacular, Slick 'Em, Phil (Babalawo), Dawn, Brandon Marshall (Denver Broncos LB), Slim Thug (BossLife CEO), Supa Cindy
11	11	"Reunion – Part 1"	March 12, 2018	1.65
Trina's assistant Alvin comes for Bobby. Young Hollywood threatens to expose Amara. host: Nina Parker guest stars: Dawn, Alvin, Spectacular, Slick Em, Mike Smiff, Antonio Zarur
12	12	"Reunion – Part 2"	March 19, 2018	1.96
Amara, Veronica, Steph and Jojo discuss their feud. Prince's affair with Gabby is exposed, devastating Liz. host: Nina Parker guest stars: Antonio, Dawn, Spectacular, Slick Em

== Webisodes ==
=== Check Yourself ===
Love & Hip Hop Miami: Check Yourself, which features the cast's reactions to each episode, was released weekly with every episode on digital platforms.

List of Love & Hip Hop Miami: Check Yourself Season 1 episodes

Episode	Title	Featured cast members	Ref
1	"I Had to Regulate Real Quick"	Young Hollywood, Amara La Negra, Pleasure P, Baby Blue Whoaaaa, Shay	
2	"Let Me See All That"	Miami Tip, Trick Daddy, Skrawberry, Gunplay, Baby Blue Whoaaaa, Pleasure P	
3	"Boy, Bye!"	Amara La Vega, Veronica Vega, Young Hollywood	
4	"You Ain’t About to Check Me"	Young Hollywood, Veronica Vega, Amara La Negra, Baby Blue Whoaaaa, Pleasure P, Shay	
5	"No He Didn’t!"	Jeffrey, Prince, Bobby Lytes, Shay, Pleasure P	
6	"Calm & Motherfucking Collected"	Gunplay, Trick Daddy, Amara La Negra, Young Hollywood	
7	"I Do, I Did, I’m Dead"	Miami Tip, Trick Daddy, Skrawberry	
8	"Take The Wig Off"	Steph Lecor, Veronica Vega, Shay, Baby Blue Whoaaaa, Pleasure P	
9	"That’s How the Ratchet Ones Are"	Miami Tip, Bobby Lytes, Joy, Shay, Pleasure P, Baby Blue Whoaaaa	
10	"Should We Be Fighting Over A Wig?"	Pleasure P, Shay, Baby Blue Whoaaaa, Young Hollywood, Amara La Negra, Jojo, Steph Lecor, Veronica Vega	

=== Bonus scenes ===
Deleted and extended scenes from the season's episodes were released weekly as bonus content on VH1's official website.

List of Love & Hip Hop: Miami Season 3 bonus scenes

Episode	Title	Featured cast members	Ref
1	"Amara La Negra's Mom Goes on Dates with Her" (Extended scene)	Amara La Negra, Veronica Vega, Simply Jess	
1	"What Goes Down in the Pretty Ricky Group Chat?" (Extended scene)	Pleasure P, Baby Blue Whoaaaa, Spectacular, Slick 'Em	
2	"Young Hollywood Wants to Vibe with Veronica Vega"	Young Hollywood, Veronica Vega	
3	"Pretty Ricky Reminisces About Their Past Beef" (Extended scene)	Pleasure P, Baby Blue Whoaaaa, Spectacular	
3	"Has Bobby Lytes Neglected His Boyfriend, Jeffrey?"	Bobby Lytes, Jeffrey	
4	"Keyara Flirts With Miami Tip" (Extended scene)	Keyara, Miami Tip, Skrawberry	
4	"Trick Daddy Fills Gunplay in on His Dating Life" (Extended scene)	Trick Daddy, Gunplay	
5	"Prince Flirts with Chinese Nicky"	Prince, Chinese Nicky, Chinese Kitty, Gabby	
5	"Michelle Pooch Confronts Shay & Liz" (Extended scene)	Michelle Pooch, Shay, Liz	
6	"Scrappy Invites Chinese Kitty to the Studio"	Lil Scrappy, Chinese Kitty	
6	"Jeffrey & His Grandmother Reminisce About the Past"	Jeffrey, Lametris Joiner	
7	"Chinese Kitty No Longer Wants to Be a Single Mom"	Chinese Kitty, Chinese Nicky	
7	"What Will Trick Daddy Leave Joy After the Divorce?" (Extended scene)	Trick Daddy, Lil Scrappy, Miami Tip, Skrawberry	
8	"Trina Sets Rules for Pleasure P & Joy" (Extended scene)	Trina, Pleasure P, Joy, Raymond	
8	"Keyara Catches Up with Chinese Nicky" (Extended scene)	Keyara, Chinese Nicky, Chinese Kitty	
9	"Is Prince's Attitude Holding Him Back?"	Prince, Jordan Daceo, DJ Golden Boy	
9	"Scrappy Gets in the Studio with Chinese Kitty"	Lil Scrappy, Chinese Kitty	
10	"Trina Attempts to Find the Source of Trick & Joy's Breakup"	Trina, Trick Daddy, Ted Lucas	
10	"Jeffrey Talks Business with His Dad"	Jeffrey, JT Money	

=== Messiness + Mimosas ===
On March 15, 2018, VH1 released Messiness + Mimosas, featuring Bobby Lytes and Miami Tip recapping the highlights of the reunion.

== Music ==
Several cast members had their music featured on the show and released singles to coincide with the airing of the episodes.

List of songs performed and/or featured in Love & Hip Hop: Miami season one
Title	Performer	Album	Episode(s)	Notes	Ref
Paradise (feat. Mike Smiff)	Trick Daddy & Trina	single	1, 11	played in scene performed onstage	
Se Que Soy	Amara La Negra	single	1	performed onstage	
Bible on the Dash, Pt. 2	Gunplay (as Don Logan)	single	1	played in scene	
Nann (feat. Trina)	Trick Daddy	www.thug.com	1	performed onstage	
Grind with Me	Pretty Ricky	Bluestars	1	performed onstage	
Sin Ti (feat. Jencarlos)	Veronica Vega	single	2	played in scene	
Pay Me	Veronica Vega	single	2	played in music video clip	
Moet (feat. Almighty)	Young Hollywood	single	2	played at single launch	
Face	Steph Lecor	single	6	performed in music video shoot	
Wave (feat. Lil Wayne & Jeremih)	Veronica Vega	single	7	performed in studio session	
What a Bam Bam	Amara La Negra	single	7	played at radio station	
Dark Dayz	Gunplay	Living Legend	8	played in scene	
Puddles	Pretty Ricky	single	8	played in radio session	
Way Up (feat. Taylor Hill)	Bobby Lytes	single	9	performed onstage	
Watch This	Trina	Dynasty6	10	performed onstage	
Insecure	Amara La Negra	single	12	performed onstage	
