= Love & Hip Hop: Miami season 3 =

Love & Hip Hop: Miami
- Season 3
- Cover used by the iTunes Store
- Starring: Trina; Trick Daddy; Amara La Negra; Shay Johnson; PreMadonna; Hood Brat; Bobby Lytes; Sukihana; Brisco; Joseline Hernandez
- No. of episodes: 14

Release
- Original network: VH1
- Original release: January 6 – April 6, 2020

Season chronology
- ← Previous; Season 2 Next → Season 4

The third season of the reality television series Love & Hip Hop: Miami premiered on VH1 on January 6, 2020 until April 6, 2020. The show was primarily filmed in Miami, Florida and executive produced by Mona Scott-Young and Stephanie R. Gayle for Monami Entertainment and Dan Cesareo, Lucilla D'Agostino, Donna Edge Rachell, James Knox, Faith Gaskins and Brian Schornak for Big Fish Entertainment. Nina L. Diaz, Sitarah Pendelton, Lashan Browning and Phakiso Collins are executive producers for VH1.

The series chronicles the lives of several women and men in the Miami area, involved in hip hop music. It consists of 14 episodes, including a two-part reunion special hosted by Claudia Jordan.

== Production ==
On November 15, 2019, Jojo Zarur announced on social media that the show would return on January 6, 2020. On December 9, 2019, VH1 confirmed the season's premiere date, along with a promo featuring rappers Sukihana, Brisco, Hood Brat and waist trainer entrepreneur PreMadonna, who had previously been attached to the show when it first started filming in 2016. On December 11, 2019, VH1 announced the return of Love & Hip Hop: Atlanta's Joseline Hernandez to the franchise, who would join the cast alongside Shay Johnson's brother EmJay, rapper KaMillion and social media personality Saucy Santana, best known for his friendship with Yung Miami of City Girls. Santana made headlines during filming, after surviving a drive-by shooting outside a strip club. On December 30, 2019, VH1 released a six-minute super trailer.

Prince, Gunplay and Baby Blue Whoaaaa, Pleasure P and Spectacular of Pretty Ricky were included as cast members in the season's press release, however ultimately did not appear.

Despite being credited as a main cast member for the entire season and heavily featured in its promotional material, Joseline disappeared from the show entirely after four episodes, after a series of interviews in which she criticised producer Mona Scott-Young.

== Synopsis ==
Miami is my town, but around here, even hip hop legends get blind-sided by the price of fame. We realise nothing lasts forever, and some of us, you know, we had to learn betrayal the hard way. I thought we moved past this, nah, cause in this city, the more things change, the more they stay the same. We still dealing with the loss, the betrayal. The race to the top just keep getting harder. All that matters now if that we still got the will to fight, cause in a city like Miami it might be hard to start over, but its never too late.

— Trick Daddy, opening monologue

== Cast ==
=== Starring ===
- Trina (14 episodes)
- Trick Daddy (13 episodes)
- Amara La Negra (14 episodes)
- Shay Johnson (12 episodes)
- PreMadonna (12 episodes)
- Hood Brat (13 episodes)
- Bobby Lytes (10 episodes)
- Sukihana (14 episodes)
- Brisco (11 episodes)
- Joseline Hernandez (4 episodes)

=== Also starring ===
- Joy Young (14 episodes)
- Jojo Zarur (6 episodes)
- Miami Tip (10 episodes)
- Nikki Natural (8 episodes)
- Emjay Johnson (13 episodes)

Khaotic returns in a guest role, while rapper KaMillion and social media personality Saucy Santana appear as recurring guest stars throughout the season. The show features minor appearances from notable figures within the hip hop industry and Miami's social scene, including Amara's mother Mami Ana, Amara's manager Jullian Boothe, DJ Nasty 305 and Radio Big Mack of 99 Jamz, producer Balistic Beats and Hood Brat's boyfriend Kenny Nwankwo.

== Episodes ==
No. overall	No. in season	Title	Original release date	US viewers (millions)
27	1	"There's No Way"	January 6, 2020	1.41
Miami mourns alongside Trina as she says goodbye to her mother. Amara unveils her new single and her new relationship. Trick Daddy finds new love. Amara's career plans begins to unravel. Joseline Hernandez heads back to town. guest stars: Ray (Trina’s boyfriend), Mami Ana (Amara’s mother), Emjay (Amara’s boyfriend), Nikki Natural (Trick's girlfriend), Alvin (Sunday's employee), Khaotic, Jullian (Amara's manager), Big Larry (Jojo's boyfriend); PreMadonna, Hood Brat, Sukihana, Brisco and Joseline are added the opening credits, replacing departing cast members Prince, Gunplay, Veronica Vega and Jojo, who returns in a supporting role. Hood Brat, Sukihana and Joseline appear in the opening and closing monologue sequences only.
28	2	"On the Record"	January 13, 2020	1.09
Amara confronts the allegations that her manager, Jullian, stole money from Trina head on. Trina decides to pursue an all girls tour. Trick asks Trina to consider his woman for the tour. Joseline Hernandez lands in Miami. guest stars: Emjay (Amara's boyfriend), DJ Nasty 305, Radio Big Mack, Nikki Natural (Trick's girlfriend), J Diva, Khaotic, Balistic Beats, British (Brisco's son), Jullian (Amara's manager); Although credited, Shay, Hood Brat and Bobby Lytes do not appear. PreMadonna appears in archival Instagram footage only.
29	3	"Trick or Treat"	January 20, 2020	1.06
Trina confronts her ex business partner Jullian about her album situation. Emjay pushes Amara to have kids. Joseline tries to stay out of the Miami drama and focus on music. A welcome home party for Brisco goes left. guest stars: Nikki Natural (Trick's ex-girlfriend), Emjay (Amara's boyfriend), Jullian (Amara's manager), KD (Trina's manager), CO (Trina's road manager), Khaotic, Balistic Beats (Joseline's fiancé), KaMillion (recording artist); Although credited, Bobby Lytes does not appear.
30	4	"Blurred Lines"	January 27, 2020	1.09
Amara makes a shocking decision about her manager, Jullian. Miami Tip tries to calm the escalating drama between Sukihana and Nikki Natural. Joseline decides she can't let Premadonna back into Miami without a welcome home gift. guest stars: Jullian (Amara’s manager), Emjay (Amara’s boyfriend), KaMillion, Sierra (PreMadonna’s employee), Jayden (Trick’s son), Queen (Hood Brat’s niece), King (Hood Brat’s nephew), Matt (Amara’s lawyer); Nikki Natural joins the supporting cast. Although credited, Bobby Lytes does not appear.
31	5	"Overstepping Boundaries"	February 3, 2020	1.05
Amara makes a drastic choice about her relationship with Jullian. Joy sets Trick up on a blind date. Trina organizes a bootcamp for the girls tour but everything goes left when Nikki Natural arrives. guest stars: Lauren (producer), Kenny (Hood Brat’s boyfriend), Mami Ana (Amara’s mother), Carolyn (Trick’s blind date), KaMillion, Jullian (Amara’s manager), Emjay (Amara’s boyfriend), Dawn (Pre’s friend); Although credited, Shay and Joseline do not appear.
32	6	"Apology Tour"	February 10, 2020	1.04
Trina's bootcamp ends in chaos. PreMadonna decides to take the high road in getting revenge on Joseline. Amara reaches out to old friends. Brisco attempts to make up for lost time. A night out ends behind bars for Trick Daddy. guest stars: KaMillion, Emjay (Amara's boyfriend), Kenny (Hood Brat's boyfriend), Chello (Brisco's ex-girlfriend), Saucy Santana; Although credited, Joseline does not appear.
33	7	"One Call Away"	February 17, 2020	1.04
Trina and Joy plan an intervention for Trick in the aftermath of his arrest. Amara gets ready for her first major concert without management from Jullian. Sukihana, Hoodbrat and crew decide to go on tour without Trina. guest stars: Emjay (Amara’s boyfriend), KaMillion, Margie (Hood Brat’s sister), Mami Ana (Amara’s mother), Alvin (Sunday’s employee), Franky Raw (Amara’s glam squad), Eramos (Amara’s father); Although credited, PreMadonna, Brisco and Joseline do not appear.
34	8	"The Ugly Truth"	February 24, 2020	0.92
The newly minted BAPS tour searches for a road manager. Trina and Joy convince Trick to sweat it out. An argument between Miami Tip and Saucy Santana puts Sukihana in the middle. Premadonna gets some information about Amara's man from an old friend. guest stars: Mami Ana (Amara’s mother), Britain “Snacks” (Brisco’s son), Chello (Brisco’s ex-girlfriend), KaMillion, Saucy Santana, Emjay, Alvin (Line Cook, Sunday’s), Khaotic, Annie (PreMadonna’s friend); Although credited, Bobby Lytes and Joseline do not appear.
35	9	"Take A Bow"	March 2, 2020	1.05
Amara learns some troubling information about Emjay. Trina and Joy plan a family trip to honor Trina's late mother. The girls head out for their first spot date on the forthcoming BAPs tour. guest stars: KaMillion, Alvin, Annie (PreMadonna’s friend), Mami Ana (Amara’s mother), Kassy (Amara's assistant); Emjay joins the supporting cast. Although credited, Trick Daddy, Brisco and Joseline do not appear.
36	10	"Homecoming"	March 9, 2020	0.97
Trina heads back to her hometown of the Bahamas to celebrate her late mother’s birthday. A relaxing spa date for Amara ends in drama as she and Shay reach a boiling point over Emjay. Hood Brat uncovers some disturbing information about her boyfriend. guest stars: Stichiz (103.5 personality), KaMillion, Mami Ana (Amara’s mother), Valentino (Trina’s uncle), Shadai (Trina’s cousin), Otereo (Trina’s cousin), Kenny (Hood Brat’s boyfriend); Although credited, PreMadonna, Brisco and Joseline do not appear.
37	11	"Pressing Forward"	March 16, 2020	1.25
Sukihana holds a brunch to discuss the issue of colorism, but tensions between Amara and PreMadonna serve as a distraction. Trick, Joy, and Bobby join Trina in the Bahamas as they all celebrate Trina's mother. Trick and Joy revisit their relationship. guest stars: Laura (Trina’s sister), KaMillion, Mami Ana (Amara’s mother), Soninyah (Trina’s niece), Valentino (Trina’s cousin), Otereo (Trina’s cousin), Dominique (Trina’s cousin), Britain “B Snacks” (Brisco’s son), Andrew (real estate broker), Chello (Brisco’s ex-girlfriend); Although credited, Joseline does not appear.
38	12	"Full Circle"	March 23, 2020	1.25
Trick and Joy consider rekindling their romantic relationship. Suki's children visit from Atlanta. Trick and Trina throw a party to celebrate the launch of their radio show, but tensions between Amara and Premadonna threaten to wreck the event. guest stars: DJ Nasty, A.J. Johnson (actress / fitness expert), Destiny (Suki’s daughter), Mar-Mar (Suki’s son), Cynthia (Suki’s grandmother), Kenny (Hood Brat's ex-boyfriend), Alvin, KaMillion cameo: Chello, Britain "B Snacks" Although credited, Joseline does not appear.
39	13	"Reunion – Part 1"	March 30, 2020	1.38
The cast join host, Claudia Jordan, to dish on a season full of drama and get to the bottom of Amara and Emjay's relationship woes. Miami Tip and Saucy Santana come face to face. Nikki Natural tests Trina for the last time. host: Claudia Jordan backstage correspondent: Kendall Kyndall guest stars: KaMillion, Saucy Santana, Jullian
40	14	"Reunion – Part 2"	April 6, 2020	1.20
Brisco and Chello’s relationship is put to the ultimate test; Trick Daddy and Joy rekindle a flame; and a look back at some of the best moments of this season. host: Claudia Jordan backstage correspondent: Kendall Kyndall guest stars: KaMillion, Saucy Santana, Chello

== Webisodes ==
=== Check Yourself ===
Love & Hip Hop Miami: Check Yourself, which features the cast's reactions to each episode, was released weekly with every episode on digital platforms.

List of Love & Hip Hop Miami: Check Yourself Season 3 episodes

Episode	Title	Featured cast members	Ref
1	"Joy Meets Nikki Natural"	Shay, Amara La Negra, Jojo	
2	"Trina's Auditions"	Sukihana, Shay, Jojo	
3	"Where's Trina's Money?"	Hood Brat, Brisco, Sukihana	
4	"Hood Brat Steps Up"	Brisco, Amara La Negra, Hood Brat	
5	"Joy Plays Cupid"	Joy, Brisco, Sukihana, Amara La Negra	
6	"Trina Has Had Enough"	Shay, Brisco, Amara La Negra	
7	"Shay and Jojo Meet Up"	Shay, Brisco, Amara La Negra, Joy, Sukihana	
8	"Suki Auditions Road Managers"	Joy, Sukihana, Kamillion, Bobby Lytes	
9	"The BAPs Tour Begins"	Kamillion, Shay, Bobby Lytes	
10	"Spa Day Chaos"	Bobby Lytes, Sukihana, Joy	
11	"Forgiveness Is a Gift"	Shay, Joy	
12	"A Diet Intervention"	Brisco, Amara La Negra, Bobby Lytes, Hood Brat, Shay	

=== Bonus scenes ===
Deleted and extended scenes from the season's episodes were released weekly as bonus content on VH1's official website.

List of Love & Hip Hop: Miami Season 3 bonus scenes

Episode	Title	Featured cast members	Ref
1	"Emjay Questions Amara's Friendship with Jojo"	Amara La Negra, Shay, Emjay	
2	"Emjay Questions Shay's Timing"	Shay, Emjay	
3	"Shay Tries to Get to the Bottom of Jullian and Emjay's Drama"	Shay	
4	"PreMadonna Shares Her Plan for Taking Over the 305"	PreMadonna	
5	"Sukihana, Hood Brat and Kamillion Share Their Love for Trina"	Sukihana, Hood Brat, Kamillion	
6	"Sukihana Gives Bobby Lytes and Miami Tip the Rundown on Nikki"	Sukihana, Bobby Lytes, Miami Tip	
7	"Hood Brat Gets Advice from Bobby and Sukihana"	Hood Brat, Bobby Lytes, Sukihana	
8	"Trina and Joy Got Trick to Try on a Waist Shaper" (Extended scene)	Trina, Joy, Trick Daddy	
9	"Alvin Has High Hopes for the BAPs Tour"	Bobby Lytes, Hood Brat, Sukihana, Kamillion	
10	"Joy's Emotional Reveal About Honoring Trina's Late Mother"	Joy, Bobby Lytes	
11	"Sukihana Hosts a Sip-and-Paint Class for Hood Brat"	Sukihana, Kamillion, Hood Brat	
12	"Shay Confronts a Lovesick Emjay at Her Cover Launch"	Shay, Nikki Natural, Emjay	
