= What A Bam Bam =

Single by Amara La Negra
- Released: February 22, 2018
- Genre: Dembow; Latin Pop
- Length: 3:08
- Label: Fast Life Entertainment Worldwide, BMG
- Songwriter: Amara La Negra
- Producer: DJ Mostwanted

Amara La Negra singles chronology
"Se Que Soy" (2017)	"What A Bam Bam" (2018)	"Insecure" (2018)

Music video
- "Amara La Negra - What A Bam Bam" on YouTube

"What A Bam Bam" is a song recorded by Dominican-American singer Amara La Negra. It was released as a single on February 20, 2018, by Fast Life Entertainment Worldwide and BMG. The song was produced by DJ Mostwanted and features a sample by the reggae song "Bam Bam" by Sister Nancy. It peaked on Billboard at number 8 on the Latin Pop Digital Song Sales chart on March 3, 2018.

== Music video ==
A music video to accompany the release of "What A Bam Bam" was released onto YouTube on March 16, 2019, at a total length of three minutes and twelve seconds. It was directed by Montoya el Duro and features scenes of a pool party located in Miami, Florida.

== Charts ==
Chart (2019)	Peak position
Latin Pop Digital Song Sales (Billboard)	8
