= Jessie Woo =

Hatian-American comedian (born 1990)

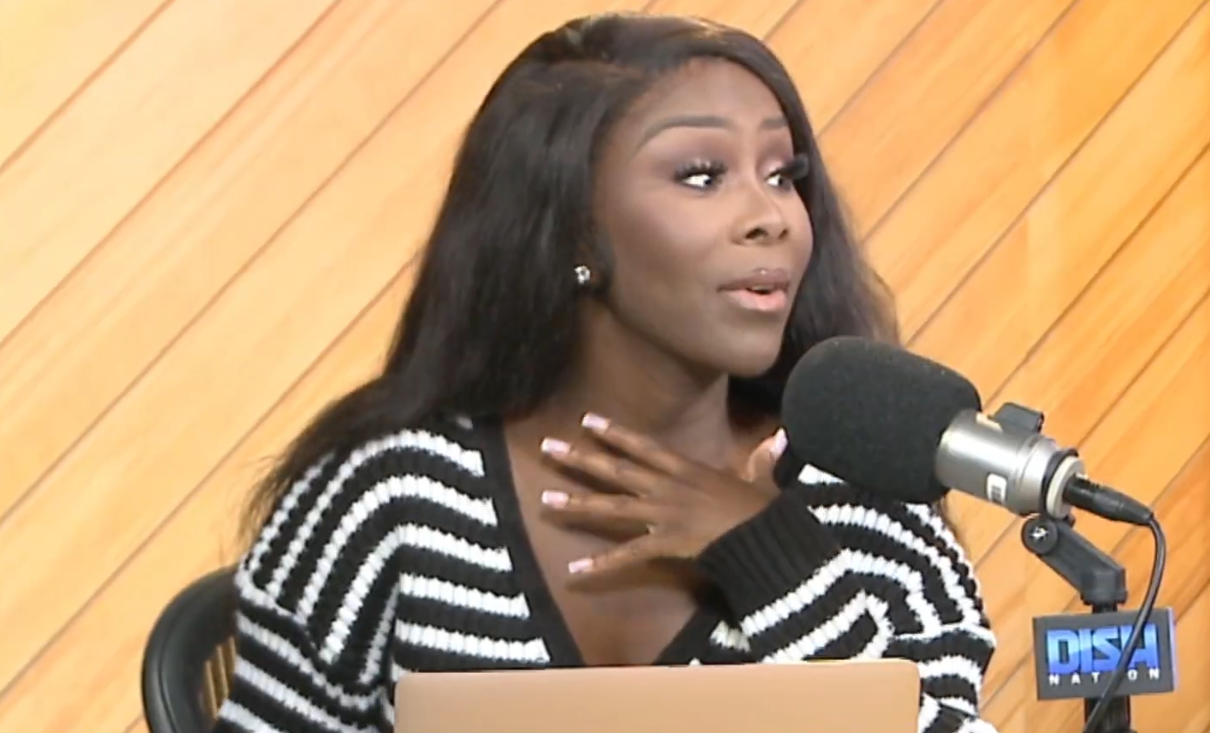
- Woo in 2023
- Born: Jessica Juste; July 6, 1990 (age 36); Montréal, Canada
- Other name: Jessica Fyre
- Education: Dr. Michael M. Krop Senior High School; Florida International University
- Employer: BET
- Website: www.thisisjessiewoo.com

Jessica Juste (born July 6, 1990), known professionally as Jessie Woo, is a Haitian-American and Canadian comedian, musician, and social media personality. She is a host at BET and has appeared on TV shows Love & Hip Hop: Miami and Wild 'n Out.

Born in Canada, Woo grew up in Miami, Florida. After attempting a music career in Miami, Woo moved to Brooklyn, New York, where she quickly went viral with her humorous Instagram posts as a means of coping with depression. She later released an extended play titled Moods of a Cancer and has been known for her cultural and political commentary.

== Career ==
Woo became famous on social media through her comedic alter-ego character Cadoushka Jean-Francois. She said of the start to her online fame, "It was all I could do to not kill myself. I had come to New York and was suddenly questioning everything. I really think God pulled me through that time". She became known for her raps in Krenglish, a mixture of Haitian Creole and English.

Woo was cast as a supporting member in Love & Hip Hop: Miami season 2, which aired from January to March 2019. She credited her fans for her casting, who would tag show producer Mona Scott-Young in the comments of her Instagram videos. On the show, she came into conflict with Amara La Negra over issues of trust. Later in the season, she discussed being a rape survivor.

In June 2019, Woo released her debut extended play, Moods of a Cancer. The EP was praised for "playful" songs including Trap Phone, Make It Last and Unattainable. It included humorous interludes from her online personas. One song, Vacation, was described as a mixture of dancehall pop, traditional compas and R&B sung in Haitian Creole. It was engineered by Shaft, who also co-wrote Bodak Yellow.

Following her social media success, Woo was selected to host BET Breaks, the news program produced by BET. She also hosted the 2019 Black Girls Rock! gold carpet special for BET and performed at the Black Music Honors. During her time at BET, her social media following grew and she toured doing stand-up comedy and an in-person live show, Seeester Talk Live. On her shows, she discusses both social and political topics including LGBTQ rights and gun reform. She said that American presidents have "raped the economy, raped the people" and has called out double-standards with how issues in Haiti are covered compared to those of other countries.

Woo was also cast as a starring cast member for several Wild 'n Out seasons beginning with season 16, premiering in August 2021. While on the show, she used the alias Jessica Fyre. On the show, she was criticized for a dark humor joke she made about Whitney Houston, saying "and I... I'm dead" after an impersonation.

She is a co-host of Twitter-based talk show Power Star Live and has worked as a host and writer for the BBC's show Black to Life. Woo has served as an award show fashion commentator for Entertainment Tonight. Woo has also hosted for Dish Nation from 2019 to 2022.

In May 2022, Woo starred in Wyclef Jean's music video Voye Dlo on Haitian Flag Day. Jean selected Woo for her ability to rap in Haitian Kreyol in the single, which was called "a letter to Haiti".

Woo attained 985,000 Instagram followers by May 2024. As of April 2026, she has 281,000 YouTube subscribers.

== Early life ==
Jessica Juste was born in Montréal, Canada on July 6, 1990 to Haitian parents. She attended mission trips to Haiti as a child with her mother, a choir director. At six years old, she moved to Miami, Florida with her mother and her younger siblings following her parents' divorce.

She attended Dr. Michael M. Krop Senior High School in Ives Estates, Florida. Woo graduated from Florida International University in 2017 with a master's degree in global strategic communications.

She attempted to become a musical artist in Miami before moving to Brooklyn, New York. In the summer of 2017, Woo lost her job and had to rely on food stamps and unemployment money, leading her to vent her frustrations on social media.

In June 2018, Woo told CNN that discussions with her brother Jeremy were the reason she backed away from the brink of suicide. She said that she used comedic posts on Instagram as a way to cope with her depression and was eventually able to achieve her dream of becoming a reality television star.

In 2019, Woo revealed to the Associated Press that she was raped by a successful music producer in 2012 while trying to become a vocalist. She did not name the producer.
