= Colorism in the Caribbean =

Colorism in the Caribbean describes discrimination based on skin tone, or colorism, in the Caribbean.

Colorism is defined as "Prejudice or discrimination against individuals based on the shade of brown skin tone, typically among people of the same ethnic or racial group. This discrimination can be towards both light and dark shades of brown. " The coining of the term "colorism" is commonly attributed to American Alice Walker in her 1983 book In Search of Our Mothers' Gardens: Womanist Prose. Colorism is a global phenomenon, which affects communities of color all over the world. However, histories of slavery and colonialism have resulted in the prominence of colorism within diasporic black communities, including the Caribbean, where millions of African individuals were shipped during the Atlantic slave trade.

== History ==
In the mid 16th century, European explorers claimed various Caribbean islands, enslaved people in Africa, and transported them to the islands where they were forced to work on sugar plantations. The racially diverse environment of the Caribbean, due to slavery and colonization, led to "racial mixing" between Europeans and Africans. Due to the fact that many racially mixed individuals, "mulattoes," were the children of white plantation owners, they gained privileges that their darker peers did not such as: legal status, land ownership, and education. The preferential treatment mulattoes received, combined with idea of white supremacy and black inferiority promoted by colonial settlers, fostered the notion within the communities of color that lighter skin is more attractive and favorable.

== Colorism across the Caribbean ==
While colorism affects all Caribbean countries, it varies from country to country. Author JeffriAnne Wilder, while conducting research for her book Color Stories: Black Women and Colorism in the 21st Century, discovered that Afro-Caribbean identifying women had a tendency to qualify their statements about colorism with respect to their home country.

=== Haiti ===
During the colonial era, the French established a "three tiered social structure" which put grand blancs (white elites) at the top and black slaves at the bottom. In between the two groups were "freedmen," the predominantly mulatto descendants of slave owners and slaves.

After the Haitian Revolution drastically altered the Haitian social structure by largely eliminating the colonial ruling class and the rest of the white population, the urban elite resided atop Haiti's social structure in the 19th century. The urban elite was an exclusive group of mulattoes. One's skin complexion determined one's individual social capital, while French norms of language, manners, religion intermarriage with other mulattoes reinforced the social hierarchy.

By the 21st century, the social hierarchy, which held lighter-complected individuals at the peak social power in the 19th century, morphed into a preference for lighter skin. Ritualistic skin bleaching to lighten one’s skin, brown paper bag tests to verify one's skin tone, and degradation of darker-complected Haitians as ugly are contemporary manifestations of colorism in Haiti.

=== Dominican Republic ===
Racism and colorism in the Dominican Republic exists due to the after-effects of African slavery and the subjugation of black people throughout history. In the Dominican Republic, "blackness" is often associated with the illegal Haitian migrants minority, who have a lower class status in the country. People who possess more African-like phenotypic features are often victims of discrimination, and are seen as foreigners. An envoy of the UN in October 2007 found that there was racism against black people in general, and particularly against Haitians.

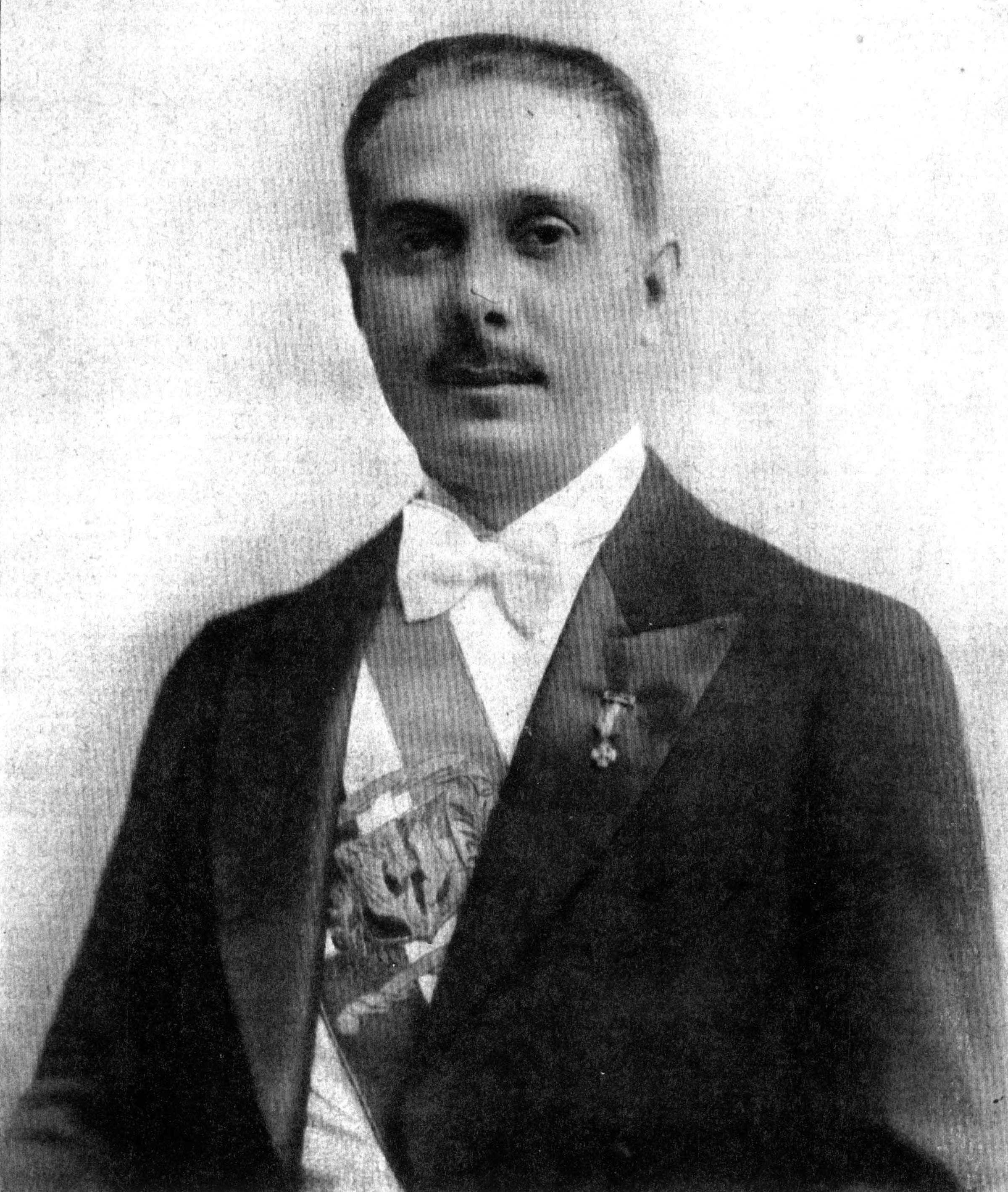
The Dominican dictator Rafael Leónidas Trujillo, who governed between 1930 and 1961, tenaciously promoted an anti-Haitian sentiment and used racial persecution and nationalistic fervor against Haitian migrants.

The Dominican Republic has a right of blood law, which bases nationality on ancestral lineage rather than land of birth. The country has a large population of Haitian migrant descendants who are not seen as citizens, and are considered stateless by many human-rights organizations. A 2013 study concluded that Dominican Republic was the second most xenophobic country in the Americas. When individuals in the country were asked who they wouldn't want as neighbors, 15-20% responded those of "another race".

The Dominican Republic, like most countries in Latin America that were colonized by Europeans, shows a strong correlation between race and wealth. The upper and upper-middle classes of the Dominican Republic are overwhelmingly of European origin. The middle class is the class with the broadest colour spectrum and is composed mostly of mixed race individuals of varying skintones, while the lower working-class is darker. The underclass is predominantly black, with many being of Haitian migrant background.

People of predominant European ancestry in Dominican Republic have an economic and social privilege, and have strong representation in politics, business and the media, while those of African ancestry are in the lowest strata of society. Thus in the country whiteness is often associated with wealth, intelligence, beauty, and cleanliness, while blackness is associated with poverty, lower education, unattractive features, and uncleanliness.

Due to the influence of European colonization and the propagation of Africans or "darker people" as inferior, being of African ancestry is often not desired or acknowledged in the Dominican Republic. The mixed-race population generally identify as "Mestizo" or "Indio" rather than Mulatto, preferring to acknowledge only their European and Indigenous heritage, while those with darker skin and other traits associated with 'Blackness' face rejection and social exclusion. In Latin America, there is more flexibility in how people racially categorize themselves: they identify themselves mostly based on skin color and facial features and not so much their ancestry, allowing for more "racial fluidity." For example, a person who has some degree of Black ancestry can identify as non-Black if they can 'pass' as such.

Socioeconomic status also heavily influence race classification in Latin America and tends to be correlated with whiteness. In the Dominican Republic, those of higher social status tend to be predominately of a lighter color tone as are often labeled as 'blanco/a', 'trigueño/a', or 'indio/a', while poorer people tend to be 'moreno/a', 'negro/a, or 'prieto/a', the latter category being heavily associated with Haitian migrants.

=== Jamaica ===
In 1655, English military leader, Oliver Cromwell captured Jamaica from Spain Although a few Black slaves had been brought into Jamaica while the island was under Spanish rule, after the conquest the island was fully converted into a plantation economy, contributing to 97% of the population being of total or partial African descent. Jamaican slavery was accompanied by a social hierarchy, placing whites at the top, mixed people of color with “limited privileges” next, and black slaves at the bottom. The racial hierarchy largely stemmed from sex between white men and African women.

There were different names for different combinations of racial mixing. Mulatto was the offspring of a white man and black woman; the child of a mulatto and a black, a Sambo. The child of a white and a mulatto was a quadroon; the combination of quadroon and a white was a mustee. The child of a mustee by a white man was known as a musteefino. While the children of a musteefino are free by law, and rank as white persons to all intents and purposes.

The social stratification of Blacks by skin tone influences Jamaica’s social structure even after the abolition of slavery in Jamaica in 1833. Colorism in Jamaica was perpetuated through social and cultural institutions such as music, social games, sports, and school For example, in one particular school-yard game, Jamaican children have been heard chanting "Brown girl in the ring." According to Dr. Petra Robinson, in her dissertation, the game promotes a preference for 'brown-skinned girls' over dark-skinned ones. Contemporarily, many Jamaicans have used the phrase, "When your black turns brown, stick around. When you're white, it's alright."

== Media representation ==
=== Literary representation ===
In 1926, Guyanese author and Harlem Renaissance author Eric Waldron penned the composition novel, Tropic Death. The ten stories which make up the novel explore Caribbean identity and location. Throughout the novel, namely in stories such as “the Yellow One,” and “White Snake,” Waldron represents and explores what colorism looks like in various Caribbean countries. Tropic Death is widely recognized as one of the first and most popular literary work of and on the Caribbean.

In 1953, Barbadian writer George Lamming published In the Castle of My Skin, his first acclaimed novel. The story is set in the colonial Caribbean, and explores ideologies of racism, colorism, and miseducation. Lamming stated that in his work, he aimed to capture the oppressive experience of the "terror of the mind; a daily exercise in self-mutilation. Black versus black in a battle for self-improvement.

The Guyanese author Edgar Mittelholzer described the effects of colorism on his own life in his memoir, A Swarthy Boy.

=== Multimedia representation ===
==== Television ====
On Télévision Nationale d'Haïti (TNH or the Haitian National Television Network), cultural color stereotypes like “Zuzu girl” on the pop-culture comedy show Regards Croisés and other fictional representatives of the Haitian elite and other recognizable stereotypes have been featured.

==== Music ====
In Jamaica, Reggae music has often been used to protests against skin whitening and colorism in Jamaica. Many reggae artists have been strong proponents of the Black is Beautiful campaign which started in the 1970s.

Popular Jamaican dancehall artist, Vybz Kartel, fielded accusations of skin whitening in 2011, when people noticed his lighten complexion. In response to the allegations, Kartel stated "When black women stop straightening their hair and wearing wigs and weaves... then I’ll stop using the ‘cakesoap’ and we’ll all live naturally ever after." Following these comments, Kartel announced the launching of his own cosmetic line which featured skin bleaching products.

Spice, a Jamaican dancehall artist, released this song in 2018. "Black Hypocrisy" addresses colorism, a social issue where individuals are treated differently based on the shade of their skin, often favoring lighter skin tones over darker ones.

In the song, Spice reflects on her own experiences with colorism and societal expectations related to skin color. She criticizes the pressure to conform to certain beauty standards and challenges the notion that lighter skin is more socially acceptable. The music video for the song features a powerful visual transformation, where Spice appears to lighten her skin, serving as a commentary on the pressures individuals face to conform to specific beauty ideals.

"Black Hypocrisy" received attention for its bold and thought-provoking take on colorism within the context of the dancehall music genre. It sparked conversations about beauty standards and the impact of colorism on individuals, particularly within the Caribbean and broader global contexts.

==== Social media ====
The social media campaign, #UnfairandLovely, aims to combat global colorism by "highlight[ing] the beauty of dark-skinned people of color, who are routinely under-represented in the media around the world." The campaign satirizes the name of the skin whitening cream, "Fair and Lovely."

== Skin bleaching ==
Skin Bleaching is the process of using cosmetic, homemade or dermatological concoctions for the purpose of lightening one’s skin. Skin bleaching has global commercial appeal as seen by the sale of products such as: “Skin So White,” “White Perfect,” and “White and Lovely.” These products are mostly sold outside the US, in places like the Caribbean, African countries, India, and others. Many scholars theorize that the phenomenon known as, Skin bleaching, is a product of the preference for lighter skin in communities of color. Some studies show that because, since slavery lighter skin has been treated more favorably than dark skin in colonized communities, people of color have been motivated to bleach their skin.

Skin bleaching, according to some medical research, causes fragile skin, bad scarring, poor wound healing and possibly cancer. For this reason, countries in which bleaching is popular have attempted various means to cease the use of bleaching creams and other products. Jamaica, banned several bleaching creams, dolled out fines for their usage, and ran a campaign "Don't Kill the Skin," where police raided various vendors of bleaching products. However, as skin bleaching products are easily homemade, bleaching prevailed the government's attempts.

The skin bleaching epidemic is growing like wildfire especially in Jamaica. Those who bleach often are called, "Bleachers." It occurs so much because, darker Jamaican women want to feel "beautiful," and wanted; not only by a significant other but by the workforce.^{[21]} There is a documentary called, "Skin Bleaching in Jamaica June 2013," in this video journalist went around Jamaica interviewing different women, asking them why they bleached and about who its harming their bodies. One lady said, "When you're black nobody sees you, when you're brown then they will see you." With colorism, the practice of skin bleaching in Jamaica has been linked to colorism, a form of discrimination based on skin color. According to a Jamaican government survey from 2017, about 300,000 people in the country of 2.8 million bleach their skin.

== Noted works ==
- Shades of Difference: Why Skin Color Matters by Evelyn Green
- The Construction and Representation of Race and Ethnicity in the Caribbean and the World by Mervyn C. Alleyne
- Colorism in the Spanish Caribbean: Legacies of Race and Racism in Dominican and Puerto Rican Literature by Malinda M. Williams
- Black in Latin America by Henry Louis Gates, Jr.
- Representations of Colorism in the Jamaican Culture and the Practice of Skin Bleaching by Christopher Andrew Dwight Charles
- Colorism and Class in the Jamaican Literary Imagination by Brittani Nivens
- Race, Gender, and the Politics of Skin Tone by Margaret L. Hunter
- Film and Fabrication: How Hollywood Determines how We SEE Colorism: A Cultural Reading by Nawshaba Ahmed
- Skin Deep: Women Writing on Color, Culture and Identity by Elena Featherston
- Cues of Colorism: The Psychological, Sociocultural, and Developmental Differences Between Light-skinned and Dark-skinned African-Americans by Tasia M. Pinkston
- The Borders of Dominicanidad: Race, Nation, and Archives of Contradiction by Lorgia Garcia-Peña
