= Steph Lecor =

American singer

- Born: Stephanie Lecor; Miami, Florida
- Other name: Stephie Lecor
- Occupations: Singer; rapper
- Years active: 2014–present
- Musical career
- Genres: Pop; Dance-pop; hip hop; R&B; electro-pop
- Label: We the Best Music Group

Stephanie Lecor, known professionally as Steph Lecor (/lʌˈkɔːr/) is a Haitian-American cast member of Love & Hip Hop: Miami and singer.

== Early years ==
Lecor was born and raised in Miami, Florida to Haitian parents. Her father was in a Haitian band, where she would watch him record at an early age. Her parents put her in choir practice and was given vocal lessons as a child.

== Career ==
=== 2009–present: Kulture Shock ===
In 2009, after touring nationwide as a backup singer for Ky-Mani Marley, Lecor started a solo career. Then, she discovered Jase and City Boi, who had collaborated on songwriting with various artists for Interscope Records and Atlantic Records, were looking for a female singer to create a group called Kulture Shock. Together, the group was signed by Poe Boy Entertainment in a joint venture deal with France-based record label Artop/Universal.

=== Solo singles ===
List of singles, showing year released and album name
Title	Year	Album
"Saturday"	2015	—N/a
"I Know You Ain't" (featuring Migos)	2017	—N/a
"Face"	2018	—N/a
