= DJ EFN =

American record label executive and DJ

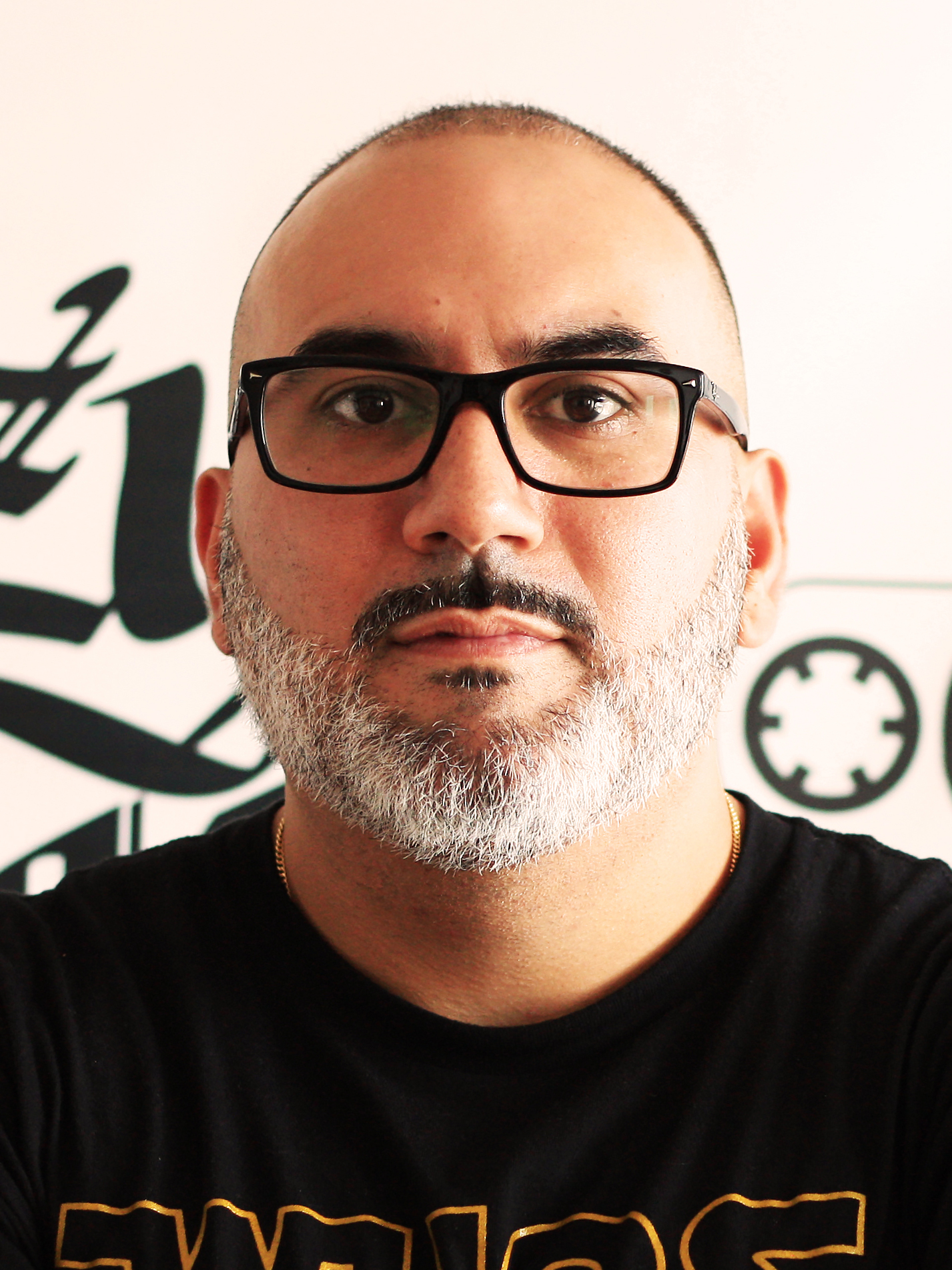
- EFN in 2021

Background information
- Born: Eric Fernando Narciandi; May 28, 1975 (age 51); Los Angeles, California, U.S.
- Origin: Miami, Florida, U.S.
- Occupations: Disc jockey, record executive
- Labels: Crazy Sounds; Crazy Hood

Eric Fernando Narciandi (born May 28, 1975), better known by his stage name DJ EFN, is an American podcaster and disc jockey from Miami, Florida. He is the creator and co-host (with N.O.R.E.) of Drink Champs, a weekly talk show/podcast focused on celebrity interviews, presented by Revolt.

He founded the multimedia company Crazy Hood Productions in 1993. Best known for his work in Miami hip hop, EFN was named Best New DJ at the 7th Annual Justo Awards — in 2002.

== Early life and education ==
Born Eric Fernando Narciandi in Los Angeles, California to parents of Cuban backgrounds, DJ EFN moved with his family to Miami, Florida in 1986. He graduated from Miami Sunset Senior High School in 1993, and received an Associate in Arts degree from Miami Dade College in 2002.

== Career ==
=== Crazy Hood Mixtapes, Crazy Sounds Record Pool, Hood DJs ===
A fan of the mixtapes emanating from New York City, DJ EFN began producing mixtapes of his own in Miami. "There was no consistent mixtape DJ in Miami, no one who ever really played the music from Miami," he said in an interview with Julia Beverly of Ozone magazine. "Everybody listened to DJ Clue or Tony Touch. It was good music, but I didn't want to hear shouts to Brooklyn or the Bronx. I wanted to shout out Miami and help to put on the local cats."

EFN's first Crazy Hood mixtape was issued in 1993. During the next two decades he produced 42 volumes of the mixtape, featuring hip-hop artists such as Outkast, Redman, Capone-N-Noreaga, KRS-One, Wu-Tang Clan, Bun B, Ja Rule, Sean Paul, Joe Budden, Lil Jon, Ghostface Killah, Keith Murray, and David Banner.

EFN founded Miami's Crazy Sounds Record Pool in 1997 (it operated through 2007) and Hood DJs, an international coalition.

In 2002, DJ EFN was named the Best New Mixtape DJ at the 7th Annual Justo Awards. In 2003, he was named Best Mixtape DJ at the First Annual Miami Urban Music Awards.

=== CHP Marketing and Promotions ===
The effectiveness of EFN's street promotion for his Crazy Hood mixtapes eventually attracted the attention of various national brands in search of help with their products in the Miami market. Founded in 1997, CHP Marketing and Promotions has numbered Tommy Boy Records, Slip-n-Slide Records, Loud Records, Epic Records, Coca-Cola, and Eckō Unltd. among its clients over the years. Between 2001 and 2004, Crazy Hood ran Def Jam Recordings's street teams in south Florida.

In 2002, EFN was named a member of Eckō Unltd.'s hip-hop dream team, a special feature of that year's edition of EA Sports' "Madden NFL" game. His teammates included De La Soul, Xzibit, and A Tribe Called Quest.

=== College Radio, Pirate Radio, Satellite Radio, Digital Radio ===
During the 1990s, EFN deejayed on local pirate radio stations and at the University of Miami's WVUM. Between 2009 and 2011, he teamed up with the rapper N.O.R.E. to host a satellite radio show for SiriusXM called "Militainment Crazy Raw Radio," a title that gave equal weight to N.O.R.E.'s Militainment brand, to Crazy Hood, and to 66 Raw, the channel on Sirius XM which carried the show. In 2015, EFN began hosting a weekly show called "OG Radio" for the Dash Radio digital broadcasting platform.

=== Crazy Goods ===
In 1997, with the opening of the Crazy Goods store in West Kendall, EFN ventured into the world of hip-hop clothing and retailing. It thrived until EFN shut it down in 2000, allowing him to concentrate more fully on his musical activities.

=== Crazy Hood Productions ===
Under the aegis of Crazy Hood Productions, DJ EFN has long been active as an artist manager and label executive. In the 1990s, Crazy Hood managed and made records for Da Alliance (a/k/a Da All)) and Poetik Symbolz. Today the firm manages and records Da Alliance (of which he is a member), Garcia, Heckler, ¡Mayday!, and Wrekonize, as well as the producers Big Drain, Hazardis Soundz, and Beats-N-Da-Hood.

EFN was executive producer of Who's Crazy? by Da All, and Anti-Social and Life Unscripted by Garcia. He produced Norealilty by N.O.R.E., and performed A&R chores on Take Me to Your Leader and Believers by ¡Mayday!, The War Within by Wrekonize, Channel 10 by Capone-n-Noreaga, and Student of the Game by N.O.R.E.

In March 2015, EFN issued Another Time. Not a mixtape, but an album of all original music, the DJ has described it as "a passion project." It features production by DJ Premier, Buckwild, Nomadic Trackz, BeatsNdaHood, Hazardis Soundz, Miami Beat Wave, Nonms, The Guild, Big Drain and Matt Harris, and rapping by Bun B, Gunplay, Scarface, Talib Kweli, Redman, King Tee, Mc Eiht, Trick Daddy, Dead Prez, M.O.P., Denzel Curry, Inspectah Deck, Sizzla, Sean Price, Milk Dee, Killer Mike, Umar Bin Hassan, Juvenile and others. Jacob Katel, writing in Miami New Times, praised the album for matching "the best underground talent in America with some of the godfathers of the genre to make an indelible classic." Chosen as one of "The 15 Best Hip-Hop Albums of 2015" by Ambrosia For Heads, EFN's work on Another Time was praised for deftly showing that "the walls and categories used to separate MCs due to age, era, region, and style are self-inflicted."

=== EFN Visual Mixtapes and Crazy Hood Film Academy ===
In collaboration with Miami-based Dre Films, EFN established EFN Visual Mixtapes in 2010, when it became clear that the artists with whom he was working needed music videos to promote their recordings. The firm proceeded to produce videos featuring ¡Mayday! Ras Kass, Gunplay, Tech N9ne, and N.O.R.E.

In 2012, doing business as the Crazy Hood Film Academy, EFN and Garcia produced their first feature film. A documentary account of the hip-hop scene in Cuba entitled "Coming Home," the film was named Best Documentary at The People's Film Festival in 2013. Q. Salazar, writing for The Hollywood Shuffle, described it as "a powerful film that displays the influence hip-hop has given a people who are oppressed and suppressed. The film also illustrates how hip-hop has given Cubans an avenue to express their pain, their struggles and their dreams."

"Coming Home (Cuba)" turned out to be the first in a series of documentary films devoted to local hip-hop culture in countries other than the United States. It was followed in 2014 by "Coming Home: Peru" and "Coming Home: Haiti." Writing about the series for atlantablackstar.com, Jasmine Nelson suggested, "Much like Anthony Bourdain, EFN brings people to unlikely places, exposing them to different cultures, but in this case through the eyes of hip-hop rather than food." The series has found a home on Revolt, the TV network founded by Sean Combs.

Crazy Hood Film Academy has also become involved with short theatrical films. In 2014, the firm produced "Avaricious," a film written and directed by Michael Garcia. The next year Crazy Hood produced "Siblings," also directed by Garcia.

=== "Drink Champs" ===
EFN began hosting the "Drink Champs" podcast with the rapper N.O.R.E. in March 2016. "Special guests like 50 Cent and Rick Ross come on, stories about the old and new days of hip-hop are exchanged, and drinks are consumed," noted Variety magazine's Oriana Schwindt. "The podcast now has more than five million listens per month." Since November 2016, the show has been carried on Revolt.
