= Amara La Negra =

American singer and entertainer (born 1990)

- Amara La Negra at the 2026 Latin Grammys

Background information
- Born: Diana Danelys De Los Santos; October 4, 1990 (age 36); Miami, Florida, U.S.
- Genres: Reggaeton; Latin; Latin pop
- Occupations: Singer; actress; dancer; author
- Instrument: Vocals
- Years active: 1994–present
- Labels: BMG; Fast Life Entertainment

Diana Danelys De Los Santos (born October 4, 1990), known professionally as Amara La Negra, is an American singer, actress, dancer, author, and television host. De Los Santos is of Dominican descent, and is most known for her role on the VH1 reality TV show Love & Hip Hop: Miami. La Negra was dubbed by Billboard as the show's "breakout star", landing a multi-album record deal with BMG hours after the show's premiere.

== Early life ==
De Los Santos grew up in Miami, Florida as the only child of a single mother, Ana Maria Oleaga, who immigrated to the United States from the Dominican Republic.

== Career ==
De Los Santos started her musical career at the age of 4 on the Spanish language television program Sabado Gigante as a regular cast member. According to an interview with DJ Vlad, De Los Santos was the only black girl on the cast that the show has ever had in over 50 years. After her 6-year run on Sabado Gigante, De Los Santos became a backup dancer for major Latin artists such as Celia Cruz and Tito Puente.

During her teenage years, De Los Santos joined an all girl group named Amara. The group struggled to stay together and eventually split up. However, De Los Santos wanted to keep the name Amara and added the "La Negra", meaning "black girl" in Spanish, after the question was repeatedly asked, "Who's the black girl of the group?"

In 2013, she released the single "Ayy" which became a hit in the Latin market. However, she has experienced difficulties being accepted in the industry of her home country due to her dark skin and afro, and was even parodied in blackface on the Dominican variety show Aquí Se Habla Español by former beauty queen Geisha Montes de Oca.

By 2015, De Los Santos was broke and spent three months homeless, she noted that she was washing her "ass in a freaking 24-hour McDonalds and Walgreens because I was embarrassed. I was already famous. I didn't want people to judge me or look at me in a different light because I had no money at that moment."

In 2018, De Los Santos became one of the main cast members on VH1's Love & Hip Hop Miami. Her story line explores with colorism and eurocentrism within the Latin community, which has garnered significant media attention. The series chronicles her attempts to crossover into the mainstream American market. In the first season, she comes into conflict with light skinned Latino producer Young Hollywood after he criticizes her afro during a business meeting. In the same year, De Los Santos landed a multi-album deal with BMG and then went on to release two singles, "Insecure" and "What A Bam Bam", which was the song that went on to hit the number 8 spot on Billboard's Latin Pop Digital Song Sales chart in March 2018.

With the release of her debut studio album 'Unstoppable' in 2019, De Los Santos performed at numerous venues across the United States and Latin America including the 2019 Hispanic Heritage Awards, 2019 Premios Juventud, Premio Lo Nuestro 2019, and co-hosted on the 2019 BET Live Experience with Safaree Samuels. In the same year, De Los Santos appeared as lead role in the BET movie Fall Girls directed by Chris Stokes in addition to acting in the Spanish language movie Bendecidas.

In 2020, De Los Santos started a weekly Instagram show, where, together with her mother, she co-hosts a show called “Grind Pretty, My Mom is the Bomb” that highlights female entrepreneurs. In describing the show, she noted that she defines "Grind Pretty as a great platform where women entrepreneurs, who have both small and big businesses, can come together and exchange ideas and help motivate each other and encourage collaboration.” Also in 2020, De Los Santos teamed with tennis superstar Serena Williams in an online campaign to promote women.

In October 2020, De Los Santos became the backstage correspondent on the Spanish-language competition show Tu cara me suena, airing on Univision.

== Personal life ==
In April 2019, De Los Santos announced via Instagram that she was in a relationship with Bachata singer EmJay, who is the brother of Love & Hip Hop Miami co-star, Shay Johnson. She broke up with him in March 2020.

In November 2021, she announced she was pregnant with twin girls with her ex-Allan Muses. They were born the following March.

== Discography ==
=== Studio albums ===
- Unstoppable (2019)

=== Singles ===
- 2012 "Quítate La Ropa" featuring DJ Jim Enez
- 2013 "Brinca La Tablita"
- 2013 "Poron Pom Pom"
- 2013 "Whine"
- 2013 "Ayy"
- 2014 "Pum Pum" featuring Musicologo The Libro
- 2016 "Lo Que Quiero Es Beber"
- 2016 "Se Que Soy"
- 2017 "Pa Tu Cama Ni Loca" featuring 2Nyce
- 2018 "Dutty Wine
- 2018 "Understanding"
- 2018 "Don't Do It
- 2018 "Learn from Me
- 2018 "No Me Digas Que No" with Zawezo
- 2018 "What A Bam Bam"
- 2018 "Insecure"
- 2019 "Celebra" featuring Messiah
- 2019 "Otro Amor" Remix with Miriam Cruz
- 2019 "There's No Way"
- 2020 "Ándale" featuring Khao
- 2024 "Menea Tu Culo" featuring DJ Alexis & Dixison Waz
- 2024 "Safari" featuring Safaree

== Filmography ==
=== Television ===
Year	Title	Role	Notes
2018	BET Experience Live	Herself	Host
2018–present	Love & Hip Hop Miami	Herself	Main cast
2018	Love & Hip Hop: Hollywood	Herself	1 episode
2018	Most Expensivest	Herself	1 episode
2019, 2022	Mira quién baila	Herself	Contestant; 2nd place (season 7); participant (season 11)
2019	Hip Hop Squares	Panelist	2 episodes
2019	A Black Lady Sketch Show	Sydney	1 episode
2020	Tu cara me suena	Herself	Backstage correspondent
2022–2023	VH1 Family Reunion: Love & Hip Hop Edition	Herself	Main cast (season 3)
2023	Secretos de las indomables	Herself	Main cast
2024–present	Desiguales	Herself	Panelist
2026	Worst Cooks in America	Herself	Contestant (Season 30)

=== Film ===
Year	Title	Role
2018	Bendecidas	Katya
2019	Fall Girls	Paige Davis

== See also ==
- List of Afro-Latinos
