= Trina discography =

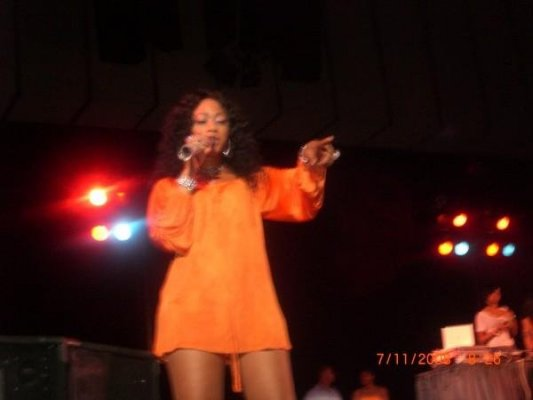
- Trina performing in 2008
- Studio albums: 6
- Extended plays: 4
- Singles: 23
- Music videos: 43
- Mixtapes: 11

The discography of American rapper Trina consists of six studio albums, four EPs, eleven mixtapes and 23 singles. Her debut album, Da Baddest Bitch, was released on March 21, 2000. It reached the top forty in the United States and debuted at eleven on Top R&B/Hip-Hop Albums. By November 2000, the album was certified Gold by the RIAA. The album also featured the singles "Da Baddest Bitch" and "Pull Over".

Trina has released the songs "B R Right", which landed at number eighty-three on the Hot 100, and "Here We Go" featuring Kelly Rowland, which became a top 20 hit in the United States and outside the country and was certified Gold by the RIAA. Trina has released five albums, being one of the only female rappers to do so.

Trina released her fifth album, Amazin', on May 4, 2010. It featured the singles "That's My Attitude", which peaked at number 10 on the Bubbling Under R&B/Hip-Hop Singles chart, "Million Dollar Girl", and "Always", which peaked at forty-two on US R&B charts and "White Girl", which failed to chart.

On July 24, 2013, Trina released a single titled "A$$ Fat", featuring Meek Mill.

In her career, Trina has achieved a gold-certified album, Da Baddest Bitch, and a gold-certified single, "Here We Go".

== Albums ==
=== Studio albums ===
List of albums, with selected chart positions, sales figures and certifications
Title	Album details	Peak chart positions				Certifications	Sales
Title	Album details	US	US R&B/HH	US Rap	US Ind.	Certifications	Sales
Da Baddest Bitch	Released: March 21, 2000; Label: Slip-N-Slide, Atlantic; Formats: CD, cassette, LP	33	11	—	—	RIAA: Gold	US: 683,000 (as of 2007)
Diamond Princess	Released: August 27, 2002; Label: Slip-N-Slide, Atlantic; Formats: CD, LP	14	5	—	—		
Glamorest Life	Released: October 4, 2005; Label: Slip-N-Slide, Atlantic; Formats: CD, LP	11	2	2	—		
Still da Baddest	Released: April 1, 2008; Label: Slip-N-Slide, EMI, DP Entertainment; Formats: CD, LP, digital download	6	1	1	—		
Amazin'	Released: May 4, 2010; Label: Slip-N-Slide, EMI, DP Entertainment; Formats: CD, LP, digital download	13	4	2	1		US: 98,000 (as of 2011)
The One	Released: June 21, 2019; Label: Rockstarr Music Group; Formats: CD, digital download	126	—	—	19		
"—" denotes a recording that did not chart.

== Extended plays ==
List of extended plays, with selected details
Title	Details
Incredible	Released: May 15, 2014; Label: Rockstarr Music Group; Format: Digital download
Trina EP	Released: December 17, 2015; Label: Penalty; Format: Digital download
Dynasty 6	Released: December 3, 2016; Label: Rockstarr Music Group; Format: Digital download
Blue Magic	Released: October 19, 2018; Label: Rockstarr Music Group; Format: Digital download
11:11 Sugalicious Wishes	Released: December 19, 2023; Label: Rockstarr Music Group; Format: Digital download

== Mixtapes ==
List of mixtapes, with selected details
Title	Details
Rockstarr: The Baddest Bitch Reloaded	Released: 2006; Label: Self-released; Format: Digital download
Rockstarr Royalty	Released: April 13, 2008; Label: Self-released; Format: Digital download
Millionaire's Girls Club	Released: January 12, 2009; Label: Self-released; Format: Digital download
Best of Both Worlds (Ladies Edition) (with Qwote)	Released: March 10, 2009; Label: Self-released; Format: Digital download
Amazin'	Released: May 28, 2009; Label: Self-released; Format: Digital download
Trina Introduces: Victoria Balenciaga	Released: September 9, 2009; Label: Self-released; Format: Digital download
Who’s Bad?	Released: October 11, 2009; Label: Self-released; Format: Digital download
Trick or Trina	Released: October 31, 2009; Label: Self-released; Format: Digital download
The Definition of a Million Dollar Girl	Released: February 4, 2010; Label: Self-released; Format: Digital download
Diamonds Are Forever	Released: March 28, 2011; Label: Self-released; Format: Digital download
Back 2 Business	Released: December 3, 2012; Label: Self-released; Format: Digital download

== Singles ==
=== As lead artist ===
Year	Title	Peak chart positions						Album
Year	Title	US	US R&B/HH	US Rap	FIN	NZ	UK	Album
1999	"Da Baddest Bitch"	—	64	—	—	—	—	Da Baddest Bitch
2000	"Pull Over"	93	46	41	—	—	—	Da Baddest Bitch
2002	"Told Y'all" (featuring Rick Ross)	—	64	—	—	—	—	Diamond Princess
2002	"No Panties" (featuring Tweet)	—	88	—	—	—	45	Diamond Princess
2002	"B R Right" (featuring Ludacris)	83	50	24	—	—	—	Diamond Princess
2005	"Don't Trip" (featuring Lil Wayne)	—	74	—	—	—	—	Glamorest Life
2005	"Here We Go" (featuring Kelly Rowland)	17	8	3	17	17	15	Glamorest Life
2005	"Da Club" (featuring Mannie Fresh)	—	—	—	—	—	—	Glamorest Life
2007	"Single Again"	125	59	19	—	—	—	Still da Baddest
2008	"I Got a Thang for You" (featuring Keyshia Cole)	121	59	—	—	—	—	Still da Baddest
2008	"Look Back at Me" (featuring Killer Mike)	—	71	—	—	—	—	Still da Baddest
2008	"Don't Wanna Fight" (with Qwote)	—	—	—	—	27	—	Best of Both Worlds (Ladies Edition)
2009	"That's My Attitude"	—	110	—	—	—	—	Amazin'
2010	"Million Dollar Girl" (featuring Diddy and Keri Hilson)	—	61	20	—	—	—	Amazin'
2010	"Always" (featuring Monica)	—	42	—	—	—	—	Amazin'
2010	"White Girl" (featuring Flo Rida and Git Fresh)	—	—	—	—	—	—	Amazin'
2011	"Long Heels Red Bottoms"	—	82	—	—	—	—	Diamonds Are Forever
2015	"Fuck Boy"	—	—	—	—	—	—	Trina EP
2017	"Damn" (featuring Tory Lanez)	—	—	—	—	—	—	Non-album single
2017	"If It Ain't Me" (featuring K. Michelle)	—	—	—	—	—	—	The One
2018	"Paradise" (with Trick Daddy featuring Mike Smiff)	—	—	—	—	—	—	Non-album single
2018	"Mama" (featuring Kelly Price)	—	—	—	—	—	—	The One
2019	"On His Face" (featuring Lightskin Keisha)	—	—	—	—	—	—	The One
2019	"BAPS" (with Nicki Minaj)	—	63	—	—	—	—	The One
2019	"Bitch from da Souf" (Remix) (with Mulatto and Saweetie)	95	—	—	—	—	—	Queen of da Souf
2021	"Receipts"	—	—	—	—	—	—	TBA
2022	"Clap" (featuring Latto)	—	—	—	—	—	—	TBA
2022	"No Voting No Vucking" (featuring Saucy Santana)	—	—	—	—	—	—	TBA
2024	"Money Magnet" (with Nia Amber, KaMillion & Supa Cindy)	—	—	—	—	—	—	TBA
2024	"No Limit"	—	—	—	—	—	—	TBA
2025	"On You" (with Swurv & Nia Amber)	—	—	—	—	—	—	TBA
"—" denotes a recording that did not chart or was not released in that territory.

=== As featured artist ===
Year	Title	Peak chart positions				Album
Year	Title	US	US R&B/HH	US Rap	UK	Album
1998	"Nann Nigga" (Trick Daddy featuring Trina)	62	20	3	—	www.thug.com
1999	"Shut Up" (Trick Daddy featuring Trina)	83	25	20	—	Book of Thugs: Chapter AK Verse 47
2001	"Take It to da House" (Trick Daddy featuring Trina and The SNS Express)	53	23	20	—	Thugs Are Us
2001	"That's Cool" (Silkk the Shocker featuring Trina)	—	51	—	—	My World, My Way
2005	"Bad Chick" (Remix) (Webbie featuring Trina)	120	48	—	—	Savage Life
2006	"Step Yo Game Up" (Snoop Dogg featuring Lil Jon and Trina)	—	—	—	—	R&G (Rhythm & Gangsta): The Masterpiece
2006	"Top Notch Diva" (Quiarre Lee featuring Trick Daddy and Trina)	—	76	—	—	Non-album single
2007	"Go Girl" (Pitbull featuring Trina and Young Bo$$)	83	—	25	—	The Boatlift
2007	"For My Love" (Wayne Wonder featuring Trina)	—	—	—	—	Foreva
2008	"Don't Wana Fight" (Qwote featuring Trina)	—	—	—	—	Non-album single
2008	"That's the Way" (Stack$ featuring Fat Joe and Trina)	—	—	—	—	Non-album single
2009	"Self Made" (K. Michelle featuring Trina and Gucci Mane)	—	89	—	—	Non-album single
2009	"Get Your Money Up" (Keri Hilson featuring Trina and Keyshia Cole)	—	83	—	—	In a Perfect World...
2010	"Tip of My Tongue" (Jagged Edge featuring Trina and Gucci Mane)	—	51	—	—	Non-album single
2010	"Wanna Fight Me" (Treecee Lee featuring Trina)	—	—	—	—	Non-album single
2010	"My Girl" (Honorebel featuring Trina)	—	—	—	—	Club Season
2011	"Just Like That" (D.King featuring Trina)	—	—	—	—	Non-album single
2011	"Earthquake" (Mýa featuring Trina)	—	—	—	—	K.I.S.S.
2012	"The Scissor" (Millionaires featuring Trina)	—	—	—	—	Your Girl Does Party
2012	"Shawty Watz Yo Name?" (Tone Tone featuring Trina)	—	—	—	—	Non-album single
2012	"Upside Down" (Laroo featuring Trina and Too $hort)	—	—	—	—	Non-album single
2012	"Turnt Up!" (J Peguero featuring Trina)	—	125	—	—	Non-album single
2016	"She Done Fell in Love" (BowlLane Slick featuring Trina)	—	—	—	—	Truly Blessed
2017	"Keep Em" (Lostarr featuring Trina)	—	—	—	—	No Sympathy
2018	"Pull Over" (Sage the Gemini featuring Trina)	—	—	—	—	Non-album single
2019	"Hit It" (Trap Beckham featuring Trina, Tokyo Jetz and DJ Diggem)	—	—	—	—	Heatwave
2020	"Set It Up" (Kamaiyah featuring Trina)	—	—	—	—	God It Made
2021	"Pull Up Hop Out" (JayVan featuring Trina)	—	—	—	—	Non-album single
2021	"Werk" (Jayla Young featuring Trina)	—	—	—	—	Non-album single
2021	"Put Ya Hustle 1st" (NOOK Turner featuring MO3 and Trina)	—	—	—	—	Non-album single
2021	"Party and Cool" (DJ Boogz featuring Brandon Christian and Trina)	—	—	—	—	Non-album single
2021	"So Into You" (Johnni Blaze featuring Trina)	—	—	—	—	Non-album single
"—" denotes a recording that did not chart or was not released in that territory.

=== Promotional singles ===
List of promotional singles, showing year released and album name
Title	Year	Album
"Birthday" (Refix) (Mark Morrison featuring Warren G and Trina)	2012	Non-album single
"Ass Fat" (featuring Meek Mill)	2013	Non-album single
"Fuck Love" (featuring Tory Lanez)	2014	Non-album single
"Real One" (featuring Rico Love)	2015	Non-album single
"Forget That" (featuring Steph Lecor)	2016	Non-album single

== Guest appearances ==
List of non-single guest appearances, with other performing artists, showing year released and album name
Title	Year	Other artist(s)	Album/Mixtape
"Whatever U Want"	2000	J-Shin	My Soul, My Life
"What's Your Fantasy" (Remix)	2000	Ludacris, Foxy Brown, Shawnna	Back for the First Time
"My Niggaz"	2001	DJ Clue, Trick Daddy	The Professional 2
"Gangsta Bitches"	2001	Eve, Da Brat	Scorpion
"I Got It"	2001	Jagged Edge	Jagged Little Thrill
"Sick of Being Lonely" (Dirty South Remix)	2002	Field Mob, Torica	From tha Roota to tha Toota
"Gangsta Queens"	2002	Rah Digga, Groove Armada	Blade II (soundtrack)
"Brick House 2003"	2003	Rob Zombie, Lionel Richie	House of 1000 Corpses (soundtrack)
"Right Thurr" (Remix)	2003	Chingy, Jermaine Dupri	Jackpot
"Do What You Like"	2003	Loon	Loon
"Boom" (Remix)	2003	Da Brat	"Boom" single
"Hotel" (Vacation Remix)	2004	Cassidy, R. Kelly	Split Personality
"What Means the World to You" (Remix)	2005	Cam'ron, Ludacris, Juelz Santana, UGK	Diplomats Presents: The Purple Bunch
"Bad Bitch" (Remix)	2005	Webbie	Savage Life
"Scream"	2006	Renegade	Dead Man Walkin'
"Frikitona" (Chosen Few Remix)	2006	Plan B, Trick Daddy, L.D.A.	Chosen Few II: El Documental
"Tonight"	2006	Trick Daddy, Jaheim	Back by Thug Demand
"That Fire"	2007	Paul Wall	Get Money, Stay True
"Bitch I'm from Dade County"	2007	DJ Khaled, Trick Daddy, Rick Ross, Brisco, Flo Rida, C-Ride, Dre	We the Best
"We Dip"	2008	Freak Nasty, Big Easy, DJ Time Bomb	Super Hot: The Mixtape Vol.1
"Tired"	2009	Brandees	Based on a True Story
"Get Yo Money Up"	2009	Keri Hilson, Keyshia Cole	In a Perfect World...
"Face"	2009	Rick Ross	Deeper Than Rap
"Sex in Crazy Places"	2009	Gucci Mane, Bobby V, Nicki Minaj	The State vs. Radric Davis
"Walk"	2009	Brianna Perry	The Graduation
"My Chick Bad" (Remix)	2010	Ludacris, Diamond, Eve	Battle of the Sexes
"Bounce"	2010	Buck$	Buckwild
"Drop It on a Dime"	2011	Money Mark Diggla	Back to Da Money
"Good Pussy"	2011	Papa Duck	Papa Duck
"Let the Top Back"	2011	Kentrail	20,000 Strong
"Skru' Op!" (Remix)	2011	U$O, Johnson	—N/a
"Hey Ho"	2011	Brianna Perry, Future	Face Off
"5 Star" (Remix)	2012	Yo Gotti, Gucci Mane, Nicki Minaj	Live from the Kitchen
"She Bad"	2012	Skywalka	Fehrenheit EP
"Ices Out Jump Roses" (Remix)	2012	Shean Dean, Cold Hard	—N/a
"Bad Gurl" (Remix)	2012	K'Jon	—N/a
"Thinking of You"	2012	Privaledge	Joe World
"Na Nigga"	2012	Gunplay, DJ Sam Sneak, Tip Drill	601 & Snort
"Keep Doin' It"	2012	Brianna Perry	Symphony No. 9
"Tic Toc"	2012	French Montana	Mac & Cheese 3
"Daddy"	2013	Gunplay	Cops N Robbers
"All Gold All Girls" (Remix)	2013	Cassie, LoLa Monroe	—N/a
"Don't Kiss Deez Hoez"	2013	Stack$	—N/a
"Wowzers"	2013	Lil Wayne	I Am Not a Human Being II
"Me and My Girls"	2013	Lee Mazin	In My Own Lane
"Having Sex"	2013	Juicy J, 2 Chainz	Stay Trippy
"Rich"	2016	K. Michelle, Yo Gotti	More Issues Than Vogue
"Panther Like a Panther (Miracle Mix)"	2017	Run the Jewels	Run the Jewels 3
"I'm Better" (Remix)	2017	Missy Elliott, Lil' Kim, Eve	—N/a
"All of Us"	2018	June's Diary	All of Us (EP)
"No Problem" (Remix)	2018	Tokyo Jetz	Bonafide
"Juicy" (Remix)	2020	V. Bozeman, Too Short	—N/a
"Freaky Dancer"	2021	LightSkinKeysha	Break the Bank
"Baby Daddy" (Remix)	2021	Tiffany Haddish, Jada Pinkett Smith, Begetz	—N/a

== Music videos ==
Song	Year	Artist	Album	Director
"Nann Nigga"	1998	Trick Daddy featuring Trina	www.thug.com	Zodiac Fishgrease
"Give You What You Want" (Remix)	1999	Chico DeBarge featuring Trina	Game	Nick Quested
"Da Baddest Bitch"	2000	Trina featuring Trick Daddy	Da Baddest Bitch	Nick Quested
"Pull Over"	2000	Trina featuring Trick Daddy	Da Baddest Bitch	Nick Quested
"Shut Up" (Remix)	2000	Trick Daddy featuring Duece Poppi and Trina	Book of Thugs	Zodiac Fishgrease
"That's Cool"	2000	Silkk the Shocker featuring Trina	My World, My Way	Nick Quested
"One Minute Man" (Remix)	2001	Missy "Misdemeanor" Elliott featuring Ludacris and Trina	Miss E ...So Addictive	Dave Meyers
"Take It to da House"	2001	Trick Daddy featuring Trina and The SNS Express	Thugs Are Us	Michael Oblowitz
"Told Y'all"	2002	Trina featuring Rick Ross	Diamond Princess	Nick Quested
"No Panties"	2002	Trina featuring Tweet	Diamond Princess	Charles Infante and Dave Meyers
"B R Right"	2002	Trina featuring Ludacris	Diamond Princess	Dave Meyers
"Right Thurr" (Remix)	2003	Chingy featuring Jermaine Dupri and Trina	Jackpot	Jeremy Rall
"Scream"	2004	Renegade Foxxx and Trina	Still Hustlin'	Bobby Stoxx
"Bad Chick" (Remix)	2005	Webbie featuring Trina	Hustle & Flow (soundtrack)/Savage Life	Dr. Teeth
"Don't Trip"	2005	Trina featuring Lil Wayne	Glamorest Life	Dr. Teeth
"In Ya Face" (Remix)	2005	Ebony Eyez featuring Trina	7 Day Cycle	Unknown
"Here We Go"	2005	Trina featuring Kelly Rowland	Glamorest Life	Nick Quested
"Frikitona" (Remix)	2007	Plan B featuring Trick Daddy, Trina and LDA	Chosen Few II: El Documental	Antwan Smith
"Go Girl"	2007	Pitbull featuring Trina and Young Bo$$	The Boatlift	David Rousseau
"Single Again"	2008	Trina	Still da Baddest	Bille Woodruff
"I Got a Thang for You"	2008	Trina featuring Keyshia Cole	Still da Baddest	R. Malcolm Jones
"Look Back at Me"	2008	Trina featuring Killer Mike	Still da Baddest	Antwan Smith
"Face"	2009	Rick Ross featuring Trina	Deeper Than Rap	Diane Martel
"5 Star" (Remix)	2009	Yo Gotti featuring Gucci Mane, Trina and Nicki Minaj	Live from the Kitchen	Dale Resteghini
"My Chick Bad" (Remix)	2010	Ludacris featuring Diamond, Trina and Eve	Battle of the Sexes	Taj Stansberry
"That's My Attitude"	2010	Trina	Amazin'	R. Malcolm Jones
"Million Dollar Girl"	2010	Trina	Amazin'	Gil Green
"White Girl"	2010	Trina featuring Flo Rida	Amazin'	Antwan Smith
"My Bitches"	2010	Trina	Amazin'	Spiff TV
"Diamonds Are Forever"	2011	Trina	Diamonds Are Forever (mixtape)	Vulpine Films
"Long Heels Red Bottoms"	2011	Trina	Diamonds Are Forever (mixtape)	Gil Green
"Party Like a DJ"	2012	The Glam featuring Dwaine, Flo Rida and Trina	Kontor House of House Vol 13	Antwan Smith and Claudio Zagarini
"UR a Million $ Girl"	2012	Dwaine featuring Keri Hilson, Trina and Diddy	Kontor House of House Vol 13	—N/a
"Here We Go Again"	2012	Vicky Green featuring Kelly Rowland and Trina	Kontor House of House Vol 13	—N/a
"Money Ain't a Problem"	2014	Trina	—N/a	Tedd Huff
"Fuck Love"	2014	Trina featuring Tory Lanez	—N/a	X Space Films
"Real One"	2015	Trina featuring Rico Love	—N/a	X Space Films
"Fuck Boy"	2015	Trina	—N/a	—N/a
"Forget That"	2016	Trina featuring Steph Lecor	—N/a	—N/a
"Watch This"	2016	Trina	Dynasty 6	—N/a
"First Place"	2016	Trina	Dynasty 6	—N/a
"Damn"	2017	Trina featuring Tory Lanez	The One	Trina
"If It Ain't Me"	2017	Trina featuring K. Michelle	The One	Trina

== DVDs ==
Year	Film
2006	Trina: Live & Uncut... Sex, Money & Jewels
2008	Still Da Baddest: Diamond Princess 2
