= No Panties =

Single by Trina featuring Tweet

from the album Diamond Princess
- B-side: "Get It"
- Released: July 16, 2002
- Genre: Hip hop
- Length: 2:42
- Label: Slip-n-Slide; Atlantic
- Songwriter: Missy Elliott
- Producers: Missy Elliott; Nisan Stewart

Trina singles chronology
"Told Y'all" (2001)	"No Panties" (2002)	"B R Right" (2002)

Tweet singles chronology
"Call Me" (2002)	"No Panties" (2002)	"Boogie 2nite" (2002)

"No Panties" is a song by American rapper Trina, featuring American singer Tweet, from Trina's second studio album Diamond Princess (2002). Slip-n-Slide and Atlantic released it as the album's lead single on July 16, 2002. A hip hop song, it was written by Missy Elliott who co-produced it with Nisan Stewart. Trina raps throughout the song while Tweet, one of Elliott's protégés, performs the hook. Prior to recording the single, Trina was already close friends with Elliott and Tweet. The track was mixed in Miami. Dave Meyers directed the song's music video in Los Angeles, which portrays Trina and Tweet going on a shopping spree.

The song is about only having sex with men who have money. While this sexually explicit content was the focus of critical discussion, some music journalists identified "No Panties" with female empowerment, and Tweet said its message was refusing one-night stands and only having sex in a relationship. According to Trina, the title and concept was inspired by a saying often repeated by millennials.

"No Panties" received positive reviews from critics who listed it as a highlight from Diamond Princess. Tweet was singled out for praise, while the explicit lyrics attracted some criticism. Retrospective articles discussed how Trina became associated with a highly-sexualized image through songs like "No Panties". In the US, the single peaked at number 88 on the Billboard chart for Hot R&B/Hip-Hop Songs. In the UK, it reached number 45 in the UK Singles Chart.

== Production and recording ==
Missy Elliott contributed to two songs for Trina's second studio album Diamond Princess (2002): "No Panties" and "Rewind That Back". Elliott is a featured artist on "Rewind That Back", while she wrote "No Panties" and produced it with Nisan Stewart. Trina and Elliot are close friends, and had previously worked together for "One Minute Man" (2001); they would reunite for "I Got a Bottle" (2009), and a remix of "I'm Better" (2017).

Alvin Speights engineered "No Panties", with assistance from Brian Kraz. The track was mixed at the Circle House Studio in Miami, and mastered by Brian Gardner. The song features vocals by Tweet, who was one of Elliott's protégés. Before Tweet recorded her own music or was promoted as a singer, Elliot had introduced her to Trina. Trina provided Tweet with advice on the music industry, and the two became close friends.

== Music and lyrics ==
"No Panties"
"No Panties" is a hip hop song, which the Herald Sun's Cyclone Wehner referred to as a "techno-hop romp". Rolling Stone's Arion Berger described Trina as rapping with a "choppy, workmanlike rhyme flow".

"No Panties" is a two-minute, 42-second hip hop song. The Herald Sun's Cyclone Wehner described it as a "techno-hop romp". While reviewing Diamond Princess for The Northern Echo, Andrew White stated that explicit hip hop tracks such as "Nasty Bitch" and "No Panties" represented the album's overall tone. Trina raps in what Rolling Stone's Arion Berger characterized as a "choppy, workmanlike rhyme flow", and Tweet sings the chorus.

In "No Panties", Trina and Tweet say they will only have sex with men who have money. This is demonstrated in the chorus: "No panties coming off / My love is gonna cost / Ain't no way you're gonna get up in this for free". Trina said the song's title and concept were based on a saying often repeated by millennials. When discussing the track's sexually explicit lyrics, Billboard editor Chuck Taylor wrote that they contained "explicit bodily functions, obscenities, and sexual activities reeled off like a porn movie". Steve Jones for USA Today noted that Trina "uses booty as currency to accumulate power and pleasure" throughout Diamond Princess.

While discussing the response to "No Panties", Tweet recounted being "told that I am always somewhere with my panties off" since in her 2002 single "Call Me", she sings about not wearing underwear while meeting her love. She interpreted the chorus for "No Panties" as about only having sex with men while in a committed relationship rather than one-night stands. Billboard's Rashaun Hall thought the song was about instructing men on how to please a woman. Some critics associated "No Panties" with female empowerment. The Scripps Howard News Service's Chuck Campbell viewed it as a "woman's manifesto", and a writer for the Knight Ridder Tribune News Service compared its "assertion of independent women" to TLC's 1999 single "No Scrubs".

== Release and promotion ==
Slip-n-Slide and Atlantic released "No Panties" as the lead single from Diamond Princess on July 16, 2002. The song was issued as a 12-inch single and a CD single, and it was also made available as a digital download. One of the vinyl and CD releases contained the explicit, clean, instrumental, and acappella versions, while another had an alternative tracklist including the bonus track "Get It" —featuring Deuce Poppi—as its B-side. A remix by Seth Vogt was also made available as a CD single.

"No Panties" reached number 88 on the Billboard chart for Hot R&B/Hip-Hop Songs dated August 10, 2002. The single peaked at number 45 in the UK Singles Chart for the week of December 10, 2002. Trina has had one other song, "Here We Go", on the chart since then. Retrospective articles have named "No Panties" and its follow-up single "B R Right" the most commercially successful songs from Diamond Princess.

Dave Meyers directed the music video for "No Panties" in Los Angeles. In the video, Trina and Tweet go on a shopping spree while scenes with men, a Mercedes-Benz, expensive clothing, and diamonds are interspersed. When interviewed at the BET Awards 2002, Trina described the concept as "a real glamorous thing about me and Tweet getting real glammed up". In the Edmonton Journal, Sandra Sperounes noted that the video does not include women without panties despite the song's title, calling it a "case of false advertising". The music video uses the clean version of the single, which Chuck Taylor described as incomprehensible due to the amount of edits and explicit language removed. Atlantic uploaded the video to its YouTube channel on October 26, 2009. Its filming was included on the DVD Trina: Live & Uncut (2006).

== Critical reception ==
"No Panties" received a positive response from critics, several of whom cited it as a highlight of Diamond Princess, including an AllMusic critic, Frank Pearn Jr. of The Morning Call, and the Miami New Times's Ryan Pfeffer. Arion Berger praised Trina's style of rapping on the song, and referring to its title, she wrote: "Who needs 'em? She's got everything else: soul, sass and a dirty mouth." In a 2014 article, a XXL writer cited Trina as one of the best female rappers, and named "No Panties" as one of her most notable songs. While reviewing Trina's career in a 2017 article, Pfeffer identified it as becoming the anthem of the album.

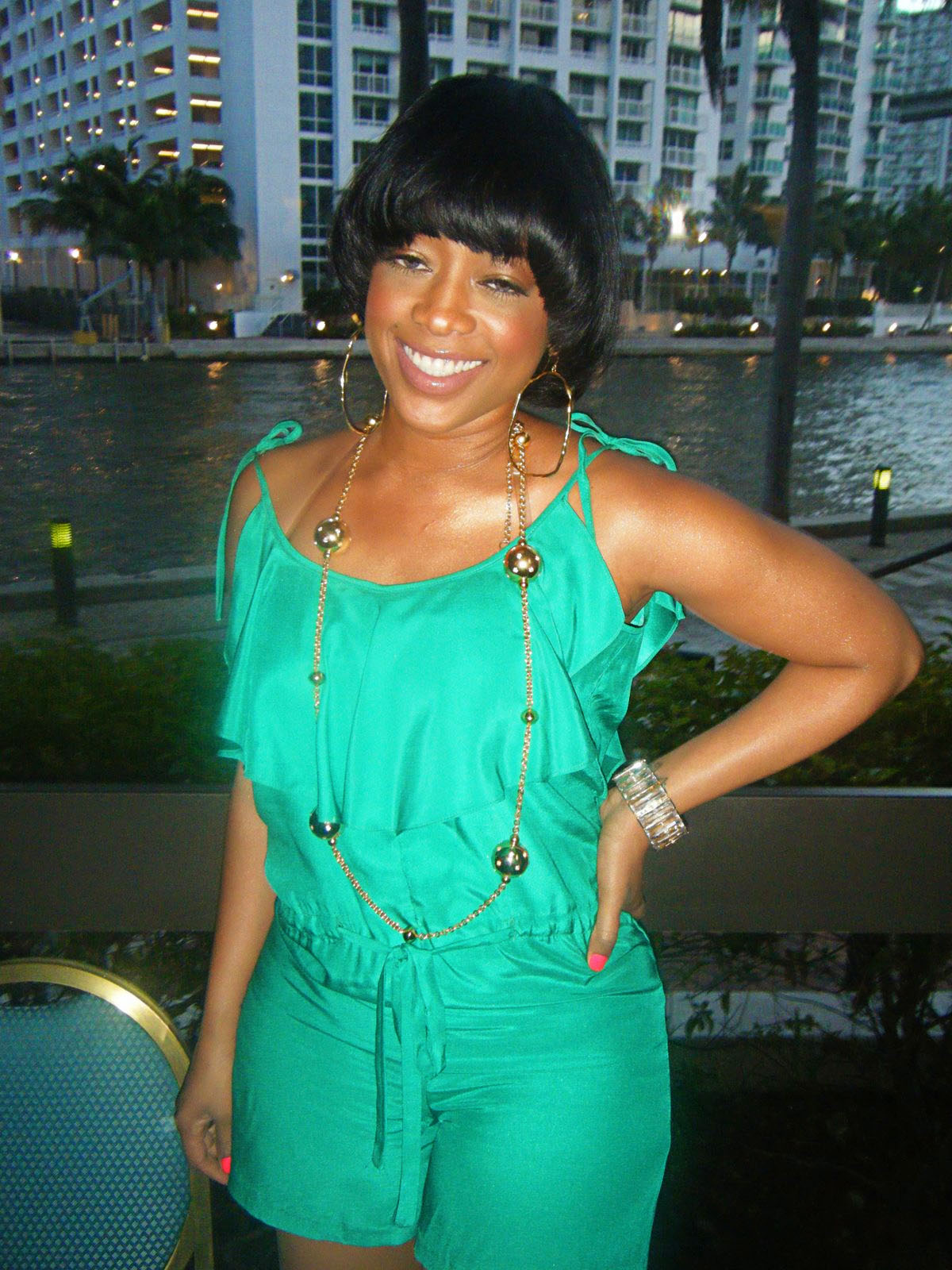
Critics have discussed the impact "No Panties" had on Trina (pictured in 2009) and her career.

Tweet was praised by critics. Chuck Campbell believed she was the perfect choice for the song. Vibe's Laura Checkoway described Tweet as having a "frisky partnership" with Trina. Checkoway pointed to "No Panties", along with Tweet's 2002 singles "Oops (Oh My)" and "Call Me", as signs of her commercial success.

Some critics disliked "No Panties" for its sexually explicit lyrics. While negatively reviewing Diamond Princess, Slant Magazine's Sal Cinquemani dismissed the single as not "even remotely as erotic" as "Oops (Oh My)". Chuck Taylor panned it as one of "the most tasteless records that has ever been pressed to plastic", and wrote that it provides another example to "blast the entertainment industry for irresponsibly marketing to youths". In 2005, a writer for Spin jokingly included "No Panties" on a list of songs that "insist on giving way too much information". Wes Woods II of The Desert Sun thought it sounded too much like an Elliott song, and believed Trina was mostly overshadowed by her collaborators throughout Diamond Princess.

Retrospective articles have discussed how the single established a trend in Trina's career. In 2010, ethnomusicologist Eileen M. Hayes said Trina became associated with a sexy image and songs like "No Panties" and "69 Ways". In a 2014 Newsweek article, Victoria Bekiempis wrote that she developed a "larger-than-life rapper persona" by recording tracks with titles like "No Panties" and "Killin You Hoes". Three years later, SF Weekly's Jessie Schiewe highlighted "B R Right" and "No Panties" as the "most salacious and sexually explicit" songs from Diamond Princess. Schiewe argued that they established Trina as an "artist who wasn't afraid of talking about sex or being ashamed of her body and what she likes".

== Track listings ==
12-inch single / CD single
No.	Title	Length
1.	"No Panties" (clean)	2:43
2.	"No Panties" (instrumental)	2:29
3.	"No Panties" (dirty)	2:44
4.	"No Panties" (acapella)	2:44

12-inch single / CD single
No.	Title	Length
1.	"No Panties" (explicit album version)	2:42
2.	"No Panties" (instrumental)	2:28
3.	"Get It" (non-album bonus track)	3:48

CD single
No.	Title	Length
1.	"No Panties" (explicit album version)	2:44
2.	"No Panties" (Seth Vogt's Thermostat Remix)	5:52

Digital download
No.	Title	Length
1.	"No Panties"	2:44

== Credits and personnel ==
Credits adapted from the liner notes of Diamond Princess:

=== Recording locations ===
- Mixed at the Circle House Studio in Miami, Florida

=== Personnel ===
- Missy Elliott – writer, producer
- Brian Gardner – mastering
- Brian Kraz – assistant audio engineer
- Alvin Speights – audio engineer
- Nisan Stewart – producer
- Tweet – featured artist

== Charts ==
Weekly chart performance for "No Panties"
Chart (2002)	Peak position
UK Singles (OCC)	45
US Hot R&B/Hip-Hop Songs (Billboard)	88
