= 2001 Soul Train Lady of Soul Awards =

American awards show

Soul Train Lady of Soul Awards
- Date: August 28, 2001
- Location: Santa Monica Civic Auditorium, Santa Monica, California
- Country: United States

Highlights
- Most awards: Jill Scott (3)

The 2001 Soul Train Lady of Soul Awards were held on August 28, 2001 at the Santa Monica Civic Auditorium in Santa Monica, California. The seventh annual awards program was co-hosted by Luther Vandross, Leeza Gibbons, Eve, and Shemar Moore. Produced by Don Cornelius Productions in association with Tribune Entertainment Company, it aired on September 1, 2001.

== Special awards ==
=== Aretha Franklin Award for Entertainer of the Year ===
- Jill Scott

=== Lena Horne Award for Outstanding Career Achievement ===
- Patti LaBelle

== Winners and nominees ==
Winners are in bold text.

=== Best R&B/Soul Single – Solo ===
- **Jill Scott – "A Long Walk"**
  - Sunshine Anderson – "Heard It All Before"
  - Alicia Keys – "Fallin'"
  - Janet Jackson – "All for You"

=== Best R&B/Soul Single – Group, Band or Duo ===
- **Destiny's Child – "Survivor"**
  - 3LW – "No More (Baby I'ma Do Right)"
  - Changing Faces – "That Other Woman"
  - Sunday – "I Know"

=== R&B/Soul Album of the Year – Solo ===
- **Erykah Badu – Mama's Gun**
  - India Arie – Acoustic Soul
  - Sade – Lovers Rock
  - Jill Scott – Who Is Jill Scott?: Words and Sounds Vol. 1

=== R&B/Soul Album of the Year – Group, Band or Duo ===
- **3LW – 3LW**
  - Changing Faces – Visit Me
  - Dream – It Was All a Dream
  - En Vogue – Masterpiece Theatre

=== Best R&B/Soul or Rap New Artist – Solo ===
- **Jill Scott – "A Long Walk"**
  - Sunshine Anderson – "Heard it All Before"
  - Indie.Arie – "Video"
  - Alicia Keys – "Fallin'"

=== Best R&B/Soul or Rap New Artist – Group, Band or Duo ===
- **3LW – "No More (Baby I'ma Do Right)"**
  - Doggy's Angels – "Baby If You're Ready"
  - Dream – "He Loves U Not"
  - Sunday – "I Know"

=== R&B/Soul or Rap Song of the Year ===
- **Yolanda Adams – "Open My Heart"**
  - Aaliyah – "Try Again"
  - Sunshine Anderson – "Heard it All Before"
  - Destiny’s Child – "Independent Women Part I"

=== Best R&B/Soul or Rap Music Video ===
- **Missy "Misdemeanor" Elliott – "Get Ur Freak On"**
  - Eve – "Who's That Girl?"
  - Lil' Kim featuring Sisqó – "How Many Licks?"
  - Trina – "Pull Over"

=== Best Gospel Album ===
- **Mary Mary – Thankful**
  - Shirley Caesar – You Can Make It
  - Dottie Peoples – Show Up and Show Out
  - Evelyn Turrentine-Agee – God Did It

== Presenters ==
- Angie Martinez and Sean Patrick Thomas - Presented Best R&B/Soul or Rap New Artist Solo
- DJ Jazzy Jeff - Presented Aretha Franklin. Award for Entertainer of the Year
- Yolanda Adams, Christina Milian and Tommy Davidson - Presented Best R&B/Soul Single - Group, Band or Duo
- Lil' Kim and Chris Webber - Presented Best R&B/Soul or Rap New Artist Solo
- Musiq Soulchild, Doggy's Angels and Byron Allen - Presented Best R&B/Soul Single Solo
- India Arie, Dottie Peoples and Gary Dourdan - Presented Best R&B/Soul or Rap Music Video
- En Vogue and Solange Knowles - Presented R&B/Soul or Rap Song of the Year
- Craig David and Sunday - Presented Best Gospel Album
- Whoopi Goldberg - Presented Lena Horne Award for Career Achievement
- Trina, Mo'Nique and Flex Alexander - Presented Best R&B/Soul Album - Group, Band or Duo
- Sunshine Anderson, Shirley Caesar and Eric Benet - Presented Best R&B/Soul Album - Solo
