= Toccara Jones =

American fashion model

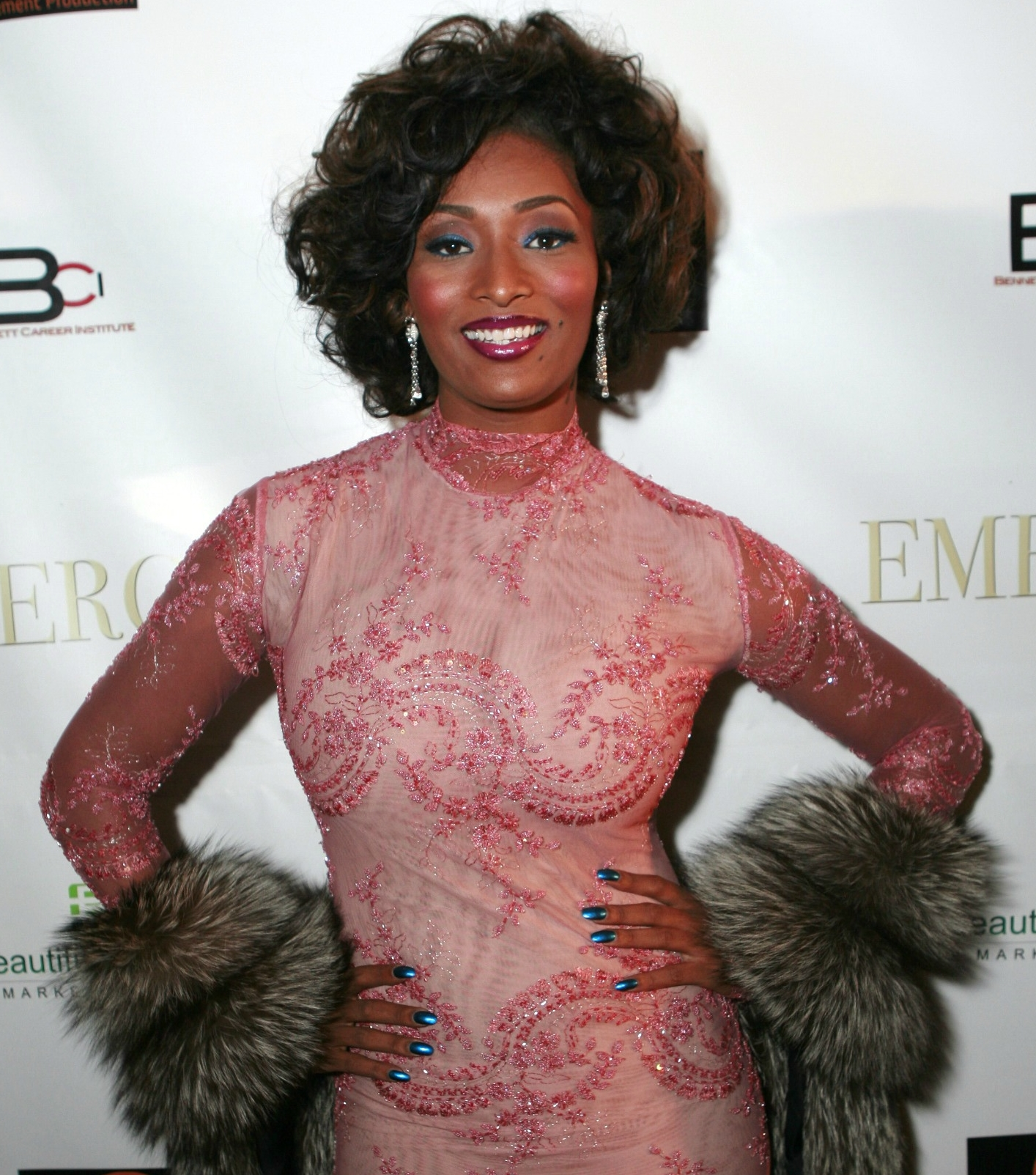
- Jones in EMERGE! Fashion Show New York Fashion Week 2012.
- Born: Toccara Elaine Jones; March 13, 1982 (age 44); Dayton, Ohio, U.S.
- Occupations: Hip hop model, fashion model
- Modeling information
- Hair color: Black
- Eye color: Dark brown
- Agency: Wilhelmina Models

Toccara Elaine Jones (born March 13, 1982) is an American television personality, fashion model, occasional actress and singer. Jones was a contestant on the third season of the UPN series America's Next Top Model, where she was the eighth eliminated.

== Early life and education ==
Jones attended Stivers School for the Arts in Dayton, where she majored in theatre and dance.

== Career ==
=== Modeling ===
She was the twelfth contestant selected for Cycle 3 of America's Next Top Model. She won "Covergirl of the Week" four consecutive times though was never placed above fourth and was the eighth contestant eliminated. She was voted as one of the most memorable contestants by AOL Entertainment.

Since ANTM, Jones signed with Wilhelmina Models as a plus-size model. She has been on the covers of Be, The Next Level Magazine (November 2005), Black Men magazine, Black Hair magazine, Braids magazine, and King magazine (February/March 2006, March/April 2006, and April 2008), Plus Model Magazine (October 2011). She appeared in the December 2008 issue of Ebony magazine.

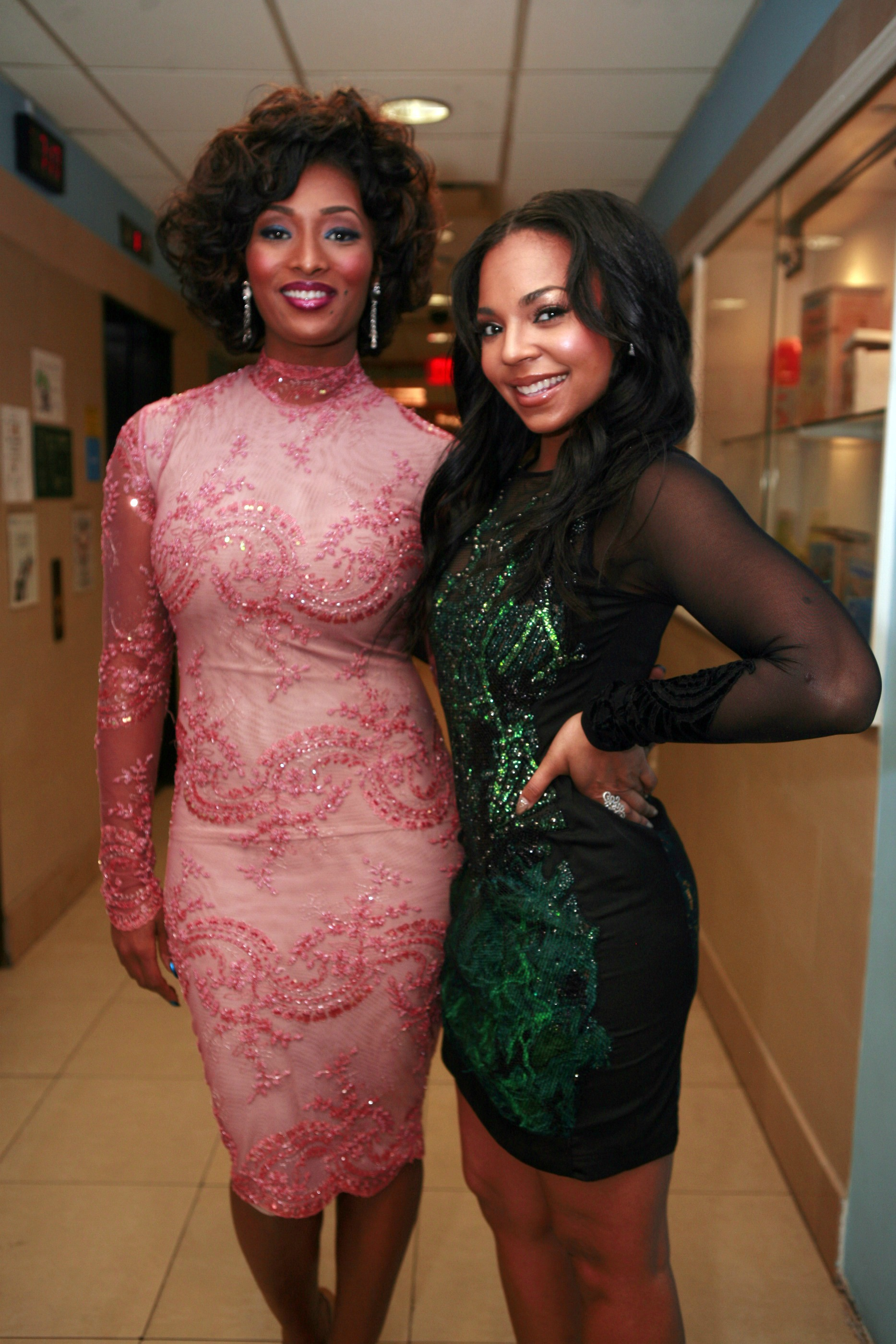
Jones and Ashanti in EMERGE! Fashion Show New York Fashion Week 2012.

Jones has modeled for Ashley Stewart, Avon, Torrid, New York and Company, Target, Essence magazine, Vibe magazine and Smooth magazine. Her runway shows include Hot 97's Third Annual Full Frontal Hip hop Fashion Show, Luxe & Romance Fall 2005, BET Presents: Rip The Runway 2, Elle Girl presents Dare To Be You: Wal-Mart Meets America's Next Top Models (2005) and Alice & Olivia Fall 2006. Jones was also selected to be part of the 2007 Rocawear "I Will Not Lose" campaign representing the Rocawear plus-size line for full-figured females.

Jones continues to model by participating in BET's Rip the Runway. At the 2009 Rip the Runway, which was held at the Hammerstein Ballroom in New York City, Jones featured several items by designers including Project Runway's Korto Momolu and Portege.

She was photographed by Steven Meisel for the July "Black Issue" of Vogue Italia, the highest selling issue ever, and had a 14-page spread in the magazine. The "Black Issue" featured significant past and current black models in response to the "black out" of black models preventing them from getting hired for print and runway jobs.

She was featured in Cycle 11 as CoverGirl's Top Model in Action.

In May 2010, she landed her first major UK modelling job with High Street store Evans, modelling their Summer collection.

=== Television ===
She has co-hosted an episode of 106 & Park. She was a correspondent for The Black Carpet and a co-host on the game show Take the Cake, both for the BET network.

She occasionally appeared on The Tyra Banks Show. In one talent episode, she served as a judge. She also hosted America's Next Thick and Sexy Model on the show. She was one of the former Top Model girls who appeared in post show interviews in America's Next Top Model: Exposed.

In 2006, Jones appeared in another reality show for VH1, Celebrity Paranormal Project.

In 2008, Jones was a competitor on the second season of the VH1 series Celebrity Fit Club. During the show, she lost 32 lb (15 kg) to get down to 173 lb (78 kg). Jones wanted to weigh 180 lb (82 kg) because it was "good for her career." Jones gained 14 lb (6.4 kg) back and appeared on Celebrity Fit Club: Boot Camp, which pitted celebrities from past seasons up against new celebrities. She ended the show weighing in at 166 pounds, surpassing her weight-loss goal by 7 pounds.

In 2011, Jones starred in the second season of the reality series The Ultimate Merger.

=== Acting ===
She made an appearance in Trina's music video for the song "I Got a Thang for You". She participated in a 2009 national tour of The Vagina Monologues with an all-black cast. She also made an appearance in the 2012 movie Think Like a Man.

== Awards and honors ==
In 2008 Jones was honored by the Middletown, Ohio NAACP at the Freedom Fund Gala. She received a key to the city.

== Filmography ==
- "Will I Ever" extra in Lyfe Jennings' music video (2009)
- "I Got a Thang for You" extra in Trina's music video (2008)
- Celebrity Fit Club TV Series .... Herself (season 6, 2008)
- 1st Annual Fiercee Awards (The Tyra Banks Show) .... Herself (2008)
- Take the Cake .... Host (2007)
- Celebrity Paranormal Project (1 episode, 2006)
- E! True Hollywood Story .... Herself (1 episode, 2006)
- The Tyra Banks Show .... Herself (6 episodes, 2005–2006)
- Girlfriends .... Waitress (1 episode, 2005)
- All of Us .... Marsha (1 episode, 2005)
- America's Next Top Model .... Herself (Cycle 3, 2004; Cycle 12, 2009; Cycle 14, 2010)
- Are We There Yet? .... (season 2, 2011)
- Hotel California (Tyga Album) .... Tyga (Hotel California 2014)
