= Amazin' (Trina album) =

Studio album by Trina
- Released: May 4, 2010
- Length: 53:22
- Labels: Slip-N-Slide; EMI
- Producers: Bigg D; Blackout Movement; Cozmo; CP Hollywood; DJ Frank E; DJ KeyOne; DVS; GoodWill & MGI; Hitsquad; KParn; Jim Jonsin; Lamb; J.U.S.T.I.C.E. League; Lady Gaga; The Monsters & The Strangerz; Oddz N Endz; J.R. Rotem; Schife & OhZee; The Single King; Maxwell Smart; Travis Spicey; Mario Winans; Young Yonny

Trina chronology
Still da Baddest (2008)	Amazin' (2010)	The One (2019)

Singles from Amazin'
- 1. "That's My Attitude" Released: August 21, 2009; 2. "Million Dollar Girl" Released: January 12, 2010; 3. "Always" Released: April 20, 2010; 4. "White Girl" Released: June 29, 2010

Amazin' is the fifth studio album by the American rapper Trina. It was released by Slip-N-Slide Records and EMI Records on May 4, 2010, in North America. It includes the singles "That's My Attitude", "Million Dollar Girl", the R&B hit "Always" and "White Girl".

== Background and development ==
Trina collaborated with an array of high-profile artists for her fifth studio album, including Nicki Minaj, Keri Hilson, Diddy, Monica, Flo Rida, Lyfe Jennings, and Shonie. Notably, Lady Gaga co-wrote the track "Let Dem Hoes Fight" and originally recorded vocals for it; however, due to contractual conflicts with Gaga's record label, her performance was replaced by Kalenna Harper of Diddy – Dirty Money.

The album's title and preliminary details were first revealed on Trina's MySpace page in late 2009, and the official cover art was unveiled on March 26, 2010. Discussing the project's direction in an interview with BET, Trina stated: "My fans can expect to embrace my versatility and growth, professionally and personally... It is a blessing to be a woman in the hip-hop industry to be able to put out a fifth album in my career."

== Release and promotion ==
Along with singles being released for promotion, Trina released two mixtapes to commemorate the LP. One is named after the album, Amazin' (The Mixtape), and the other after the first lead single, Definition Of A Million Dollar Girl.

=== Singles ===
- "That's My Attitude" was released as the lead single from the album on August 21, 2009. A music video was released for the song on January 7, 2010.
- "Million Dollar Girl", which features Diddy and Keri Hilson, was the second single released from the album, on January 12, 2010. The music video was released on March 15, 2010. The single charted on the US Hot R&B/Hip-Hop Singles at number 61, Hot 100 airplay chart at 98 and number 19 on Rap Songs.
- "Always" featuring Monica], the album's second single, peaked at number 42 on the US Hot R&B/Hip-Hop Singles. Despite being the most successful single from the album, no music video has been released.
- "White Girl" featuring Flo Rida and Git Fresh was the third single released from the album, on June 29, 2010. The video was filmed on June 7, 2010, and was released on July 27, 2010.
- "My Bitches" was released as a buzz single on August 3, 2010, but it failed to chart. Its video was released in August 2010, after being filmed in June.

=== Unreleased singles ===
- "Let Dem Hoes Fight" featuring Kalenna was intended to be the lead single but was never released. A demo was leaked before "Million Dollar Girl" and featured Lady Gaga who co-wrote the song but there were complications with Gaga's record label. Kalenna was featured instead but it was not an official single.
- "I Want It All" featuring Monica was also meant to be released as a follow-up to "Always". Trina confirmed a video was shot but it has yet to appear.

== Critical reception ==
Professional ratings
Review scores
Source	Rating
AllMusic	3.5/5 stars
DJ Booth	3/5 stars
Hip Hop U-C-IT	3.5/5 stars
RapReviews	7/10

An album preview was held on February 19, 2010, where critics were able to listen to 10 of the album's 15 tracks. Upon its release, Amazin' earned generally positive reviews. Miami New Times critic Esther Park called it "definitely Trina's crossover album" and her "best album to date," noting that it "holds its ground as the baddest record out by a female hip-hop artist right now." AllMusic editor David Jeffries felt the album was "Trina cleaning up good," praising the "hook-filled highlights and seductive club numbers" despite some redundancy in the 15-track length.

Edwin Ortiz of HipHopDX wrote that while her rhymes "rarely reach the level of excellence, they are consistent," arguing that with Amazin', Trina had successfully progressed into a "well-rounded artist." Similarly, DJ Booth observed that "loyal fans will love it," stating that "staying on top is the hard part, and if that’s true then Trina’s career is truly nothing short of amazing." Hip Hop U-C-IT echoed these sentiments, noting Trina's ability to "progress through her music" beyond her established "Baddest Bitch" persona.

== Commercial performance ==
Amazin' opened and peaked at number 13 on the US Billboard 200, with first-week sales of more than 32,000 copies. It also debuted at number two on the US Top Rap Albums and number four on Top R&B/Hip Hop Albums and marked Trina's first album to reach the top spot on the US Independent Albums chart. By May 2011, Amazin' had sold 98,000 copies in the United States.

== Track listing ==
Amazin' track listing
No.	Title	Producer(s)	Length
1.	"Amazin'"	Young Yonny	3:10
2.	"That's My Attitude"	Schife; OhZee	3:42
3.	"Million Dollar Girl" (featuring Keri Hilson & Diddy)	CP Hollywood; KParn; The Single King; The Monsters & The Strangerz	4:02
4.	"On Da Hush" (featuring Shonie)	J.R. Rotem	3:51
5.	"Dang a Lang" (featuring Nicki Minaj & Lady Saw)	DJ Frank E; DJ KeyOne	4:39
6.	"I Want It All" (featuring Monica)	Hitsquad	4:04
7.	"White Girl" (featuring Flo Rida & Git Fresh)	Blackout Movement	3:27
8.	"My Bitches"	Schife; OhZee; Geyer	2:59
9.	"By Myself"	J.U.S.T.I.C.E. League	3:08
10.	"Always" (featuring Monica)	Bigg D; Lamb	3:54
11.	"Currency" (featuring Lil Wayne & Rick Ross)	Young Yonny	3:33
12.	"Make Way" (featuring Lyfe Jennings)	Maxwell Smart; Cozmo	3:53
13.	"Let Dem Hoes Fight" (featuring Kalenna Harper)	Jim Jonsin; Lady Gaga	3:45
14.	"Showing Out"	CP Hollywood; KParn; The Monsters & The Strangerz	4:38
15.	"Capricorn" (featuring Shonie)	DVS	3:49
Total length:			53:22

iTunes Store bonus track
No.	Title	Producer(s)	Length
16.	"Gucci Shoe Shoppin'"	GoodWill & MGI	3:37

== Personnel ==
Credits for Amazin' adapted from Allmusic.

- Musa "Milk" Adeoye – A&R
- Natario King Johnson (songwriter)
- Wayne Allison – mixing
- Chris Athens – mastering
- Bigg D – producer
- The Blackout Movement – producer
- Julian "Ju–Boy" Boothe – A&R
- Leslie Brathwaite – mixing
- Josh "Redd" Burke – executive producer
- Henry "Hollywood Henry" Cedeno – marketing, product manager
- Don Corell – producer
- Cozmo – producer
- CP Hollywood – producer
- Sheika Daley – make–Up
- DJ Frank E – producer
- OhZee – producer
- Karen "KD" Douglas – creative supervision
- DVS – Mixing
- Roger Erickson – photography
- Ira Folston – engineer
- Jamee Gidwitz – stylist
- Jim Jonsin – producer
- J.U.S.T.I.C.E. League – producer
- KParn – producer
- LambL – producer
- Yasiel "Edge" Landrian – engineer
- Marilyn Lopez – publicity
- Ted "Touche" Lucas – composer, executive producer
- Kisha Madrid – publicity
- Angela Meadows – hair stylist
- Charles Moniz – engineer
- Lili Picou – art direction
- Reginald Saunders – composer, creative supervision
- Schife – producer
- Ray Seay – mixing
- Shonie – vocals
- Maxwell Smart – producer
- Travis "KParn" Spivey – keyboards
- Katrina "Trina" Taylor – executive producer
- Mathew Testa – engineer
- Wouri Vice – stylist
- Jason Wilkie – assistant
- Young Yonny – producer

== Charts ==
=== Weekly charts ===
Weekly chart performance for Amazin'
Chart (2010)	Peak position
US Billboard 200	13
US Independent Albums (Billboard)	1
US Top Rap Albums (Billboard)	2
US Top R&B/Hip-Hop Albums (Billboard)	4

=== Year-end charts ===
Year-end chart performance for Amazin'
Chart (2010)	Position
US Independent Albums (Billboard)	36
US Top Rap Albums (Billboard)	27
US Top R&B/Hip-Hop Albums (Billboard)	66
