= Always (Trina song) =

Single by Trina featuring Monica

from the album Amazin'
- Released: April 20, 2010
- Genre: Hip hop; R&B
- Length: 4:01
- Label: EMI, Slip-n-Slide
- Songwriters: Katrina Taylor, Derrick Baker, Josh Augustus Burke, Cainon Lamb, Michael Sterling
- Producers: Bigg D, Lamb

Trina singles chronology
| "Million Dollar Girl" (2010) | "Always" (2010) | "White Girl" (2010) |

Monica singles chronology
| "Everything to Me" (2010) | "Always" (2010) | "Love All Over Me" (2010) |

"Always" is a song by American recording artist Trina. It features guest vocals by singer Monica and was written by Derrick Baker, Josh Augustus Burke, Cainon Lamb, and Michael Sterling and co-produced by Bigg D and Lamb for her fifth studio album, Amazin' (2010).

== Track listing ==
Digital single

1. "Always" (featuring Monica) [Clean] – 4:01
2. "Always" (featuring Monica) [Explicit] – 4:01
3. "Always" [Instrumental] – 4:01

== Charts ==
Weekly chart performance for "Always"
| Chart (2010) | Peak position |
|---|---|
| US Hot R&B/Hip-Hop Songs (Billboard) | 42 |

== Release history ==
Release dates and formats for "Always"
| Region | Format | Date | Ref. |
|---|---|---|---|
| Worldwide | Internet leak | March 20, 2010 | |
| United States | Digital download | April 20, 2010 | |
