= If It Ain't Me =

If It Ain't Me may refer to:

- "If It Ain't Me" (Dua Lipa song), a 2021 song by Dua Lipa
- "If It Ain't Me" (Trina song), a 2017 song by Trina featuring K. Michelle
