= BAPS (song) =

Song by Trina and Nicki Minaj

Single by Trina and Nicki Minaj

from the album The One
- Released: June 19, 2019
- Recorded: 2017
- Genre: Hip hop

Trina singles chronology
"On His Face" (2019)	"BAPS" (2019)	"Bitch from da Souf (Remix)" (2019)

Nicki Minaj singles chronology
"Wobble Up" (2019)	"BAPS" (2019)	"Megatron" (2019)

"BAPS" (a backronym for Bad Ass Pretty Sagittarius) is a song by the American rappers Trina and Nicki Minaj, released as a single from Trina's sixth album, The One (2019).

== Background ==
BAPS is a song from Trina's sixth studio album, The One (2019). It was released on June 19, 2019, as a surprise release two days before Trina's full album came out. The song marks the fourth time Trina and Minaj have collaborated on a track. It was released for digital download and streaming in June 2019.

Trina discussed its release on the thirteenth episode of Queen Radio and asked Minaj to film a music video with her because they were originally supposed to, but The Nicki Wrld Tour got in the way.

== Music and lyrics ==
Lyrically, the song samples "Project Bitch" by Cash Money Millionaires, a group consisting of Birdman, B.G. (Baby Gangsta), Mannie Fresh, Juvenile and Lil Wayne.

"BAPS" is a backronym for "Bad Ass Pretty Sagittarius". The lyrics of the song reference famous people previously associated with Trina such as French Montana, Tory Lanez, and James Harden.

== Controversy ==
The song become the subject of a public dispute when Reginald Saunders, the head of A&R at Trina's record label Rockstarr Music Group, released a statement regarding Minaj. In a post on his Instagram account, he accused Minaj of being uncooperative and called her a "deceiver and manipulator".

The post also referenced there being no music video produced to promote the record. Two days later, Trina filmed a video discussing the alleged problems. She defended Minaj and blamed herself for the lack of visual for the project. She explained: "I had a 45-minute conversation on the phone with Nicki Minaj about business, about my record, about my song, about everything, It's not about a video, it's bigger than a video. The video is just a portion of what's happening. This is more about making sure the business is right."

== Critical reception ==
The song received positive reviews from music critics. A Rap-Up reporter stated that "it's the Barbie and Da Baddest" and called the track a "boss bitch anthem". Rania Aniftos from Billboard said "Trina and Nicki Minaj have no time for unworthy men in their newest girl gang anthem." They also branded it a "boss gal anthem". Madeleine Marr from the Miami Herald said that the pair "have created a thing of beauty" in recording "BAPS". She noted "The piano-heavy tune references various fellow celebrities from her [Trina's] dating past." A journalist from Vibe said that Trina "enlisted one of the boldest voices in the game" for "BAPS".

== Charts ==
Chart performance for "BAPS"
Chart (2019)	Peak position
US Digital Song Sales (Billboard)	50

== Release history ==
Release history and formats for "BAPS"
Region	Date	Format	Version	Label	Ref
United States	June 19, 2019	Digital download; streaming	Clean; explicit	Fast Life Entertainment; Rockstarr Music Group	
United Kingdom	June 19, 2019	Digital download; streaming	Explicit	Fast Life Entertainment; Rockstarr Music Group	
