= B R Right =

Single by Trina featuring Ludacris

from the album Diamond Princess
- Released: October 22, 2002
- Recorded: 2001
- Genre: Dirty rap
- Length: 4:22
- Label: Slip-N-Slide, Atlantic
- Songwriters: Christopher Bridges, Katrina Taylor, William Roberts
- Producer: Kanye West

Trina singles chronology
"No Panties" (2002)	"B R Right" (2002)	"Don't Trip" (2005)

Ludacris singles chronology
"Move Bitch" (2002)	"B R Right" (2002)	"Gossip Folks" (2002)

"B R Right" is a song by American rapper Trina, released on October 22, 2002 as the second and final single from her second studio album, Diamond Princess (2002). It features guest vocals from American rapper Ludacris and production from then-unknown rapper Kanye West; Trina and Ludacris co-wrote the song with the former's fellow Miami native, then-unknown rapper Rick Ross.

"B R Right" peaked at number 83 on the Billboard Hot 100 and within the top 30 of the Hot Rap Songs chart.

== Music video ==
The music video was shot at The Diplomat Resort in Hollywood, Florida and was directed by Darren Grant.

== Charts ==
Chart (2003)	Peak position
US Billboard Hot 100	83
US Hot R&B/Hip-Hop Songs (Billboard)	50
US Hot Rap Songs (Billboard)	24
US Rhythmic Airplay (Billboard)	16

== Credits ==
- Mixed at Larrabee Sound Studios
- Engineer – Ray Seay
- Executive-Producer – Ted "Touche" Lucas, Solomon "Sox" Hepburn (Co-executive)
- Mix – Manny Maraquin
- Producer – Kanye West

== Release history ==
Region	Date	Format(s)	Label(s)	Ref.
United States	October 22, 2002	12-inch vinyl	Slip-n-Slide; Atlantic	
United States	November 4, 2002	Rhythmic contemporary; urban contemporary radio	Slip-n-Slide; Atlantic	
