= Booty Music =

2008 single by Git Fresh

Single by Git Fresh

from the album Git Fresh
- Released: May 2008
- Studio: Hot Beats Studio, Atlanta, Georgia
- Genre: R&B, crunk
- Label: So So Def Recordings; Island Urban; Def Jam
- Songwriters: R. Huggins; M. Espinosa; K. Moodliyar; B. Pendergast
- Producers: Git Fresh; Bigg D; T-Pain

"Booty Music" is a song performed by the Florida-based crunk group Git Fresh (formerly known as DeepSide). Produced by T-Pain, the song is the first single released by the group since they signed with the label So So Def Recordings in 2008 under the name Git Fresh, so named to represent a new beginning for their careers. Despite being a crunk song, the title "booty music" refers to Miami bass, a subgenre of hip hop music which originated in Miami, Florida.

After Git Fresh recorded "Booty Music" in Atlanta, Georgia, a radio station in Reno, Nevada took a leaked copy of the song and played it numerous times before its official release. The group tolerated the leak, however, with member Pretty Sly later stating that "We weren't upset at all, it really got us to where we are today." Though "Booty Music" did not enter the Billboard Hot R&B/Hip-Hop Songs chart, it peaked at number nine on the Bubbling Under R&B/Hip-Hop Singles chart. The song also became known in the Philippines; politician Joel Garganera from Cebu City had his 2010 election jingle written with the melody of "Booty Music".
