= The One (Trina album) =

Studio album by Trina
- Released: June 21, 2019
- Recorded: 2014–2019
- Genres: Hip hop; R&B
- Length: 49:02
- Labels: Rockstarr; The Orchard

Trina chronology
Amazin' (2010)	The One (2019)

Singles from The One
- 1. "If It Ain't Me" Released: June 16, 2017; 2. "Get Money" Released: August 18, 2017; 3. "Mama" Released: May 11, 2018; 4. "On His Face" Released: June 7, 2019; 5. "BAPS" Released: June 19, 2019

The One is the sixth studio album by American rapper Trina. It was released on June 21, 2019 on her label Rockstarr Music Group. It is her first album since Amazin' (2010). The album was preceded by the singles "If It Ain't Me", "Get Money", "Mama", "On His Face" and "BAPS".

Upon release, The One debuted at number 126 on the US Billboard 200, marking it her lowest charting album to date.

== Background ==
On March 9, 2015, Trina announced that she signed a deal with Penalty Recordings, saying in a statement "This is the beginning of a new direction and stage within my career, and now my own imprint—Rockstarr Music Group. I have collaborated with so many different talents during my career thus far, and I am beyond excited to share this phase with the world as I continue to evolve." In early 2016, Trina released "Real One", the intended lead single from her second studio album, then titled 6. Several other songs were released between 2016 and 2018, including the singles "Fuck Boy", "Fuck That" and "Damn". In late 2016, Trina released the EP Dynasty 6. On July 6, 2017, Trina announced her sixth album, titled The One, would be released on September 8, 2017, and the album was made available for pre-order the next day.

Speaking about the album, Trina told The Huffington Post: "the album is just fun, truth, growth, maturity; beyond the 'Na'an' & Baddest Bitch phase." This was Trina's first album since 2010s Amazin', and features collaborations with Nicki Minaj, DJ Khaled, Lil Wayne and Dave East.

== Singles ==
Trina released the first single, "If It Ain't Me", on June 16, 2017. The second single, titled "Get Money", was released on August 18, 2017. Trina collaborated with gospel singer Kelly Price on the third single, "Mama", which was released on May 11, 2017 to digital streaming platforms. The fourth single, "On His Face", was released on June 7, 2018. Trina also announced a collaboration with rapper Nicki Minaj. On June 21, 2019, "BAPS" was released as the fifth single.

== Track listing ==
The One
No.	Title	Writer(s)	Length
1.	"Intro" (featuring DJ Khaled)		1:05
2.	"Get Money"		3:14
3.	"On His Face" (featuring Lightskin Keisha)		3:19
4.	"New Thang" (featuring 2 Chainz)		3:51
5.	"Situation" (featuring Lil Wayne)		5:04
6.	"Ride Clean" (featuring Plies and Boosie Badazz)		3:11
7.	"BAPS" (with Nicki Minaj)	Katrina Taylor Onika Maraj	4:01
8.	"Feed Me Lies" (featuring Roquois)		4:16
9.	"For You" (featuring Sevyn Streeter)		3:13
10.	"Fuck Boy (Remix)" (featuring Molly Brazy & Tokyo Jetz)		2:21
11.	"Photo" (featuring Roquois)		3:11
12.	"Can I Live" (featuring Dave East)		3:38
13.	"Water" (featuring Rico Love)		3:30
14.	"If It Ain't Me" (featuring K. Michelle)		3:41
15.	"Mama" (featuring Kelly Price)		3:45
Total length:			49:02

== Charts ==
Chart (2019)	Peak position
US Billboard 200	126
US Independent Albums (Billboard)	19
