= Still da Baddest =

Still Da Baddest

Studio album by Trina
- Released: April 1, 2008
- Recorded: 2007–2008
- Genre: Hip hop
- Labels: Slip-n-Slide; Capitol; EMI
- Producers: Jason "Jay Roc" Roper; Thomas "Big Tom aka Chevy Boy" Bonnie; Kane Beatz; Jim Jonsin; Timbaland; Young Yonny; Pitbull; Steve Obas; Gorilla Tek; Chris "UNO" Chancelor; Young Sears; Eddie "eMix" Hernandez; J-Roc

Trina chronology
Glamorest Life (2005)	Still Da Baddest (2008)	Amazin' (2010)

Singles from Still Da Baddest
- 1. "Single Again" Released: October 23, 2007; 2. "I Got a Thang for You" Released: February 19, 2008; 3. "Look Back at Me" Released: July 17, 2008

Still Da Baddest is the fourth studio album by American rapper Trina. It was released on April 1, 2008, by Slip-n-Slide, Capitol Records, and EMI. The album marked her debut with the label, following her departure from Atlantic Records. The album's lead single, "Single Again", was released on October 23, 2007. Following its release, "I Got a Thang for You", featuring Keyshia Cole, was released as the album's second single. The third and final single, "Look Back at Me" featuring Killer Mike and produced by Hard Hat Productions, became a regional club hit and was accompanied by a music video.

The album received generally positive reviews from critics, many of whom praised Trina's signature provocative lyricism. However, some reviewers criticized the album's mid-tempo tracks as attempts to recapture the success of her 2005 single "Here We Go". Still da Baddest debuted at number six on the US Billboard 200 and number one on the US Top R&B/Hip-Hop Albums chart.

== Background ==
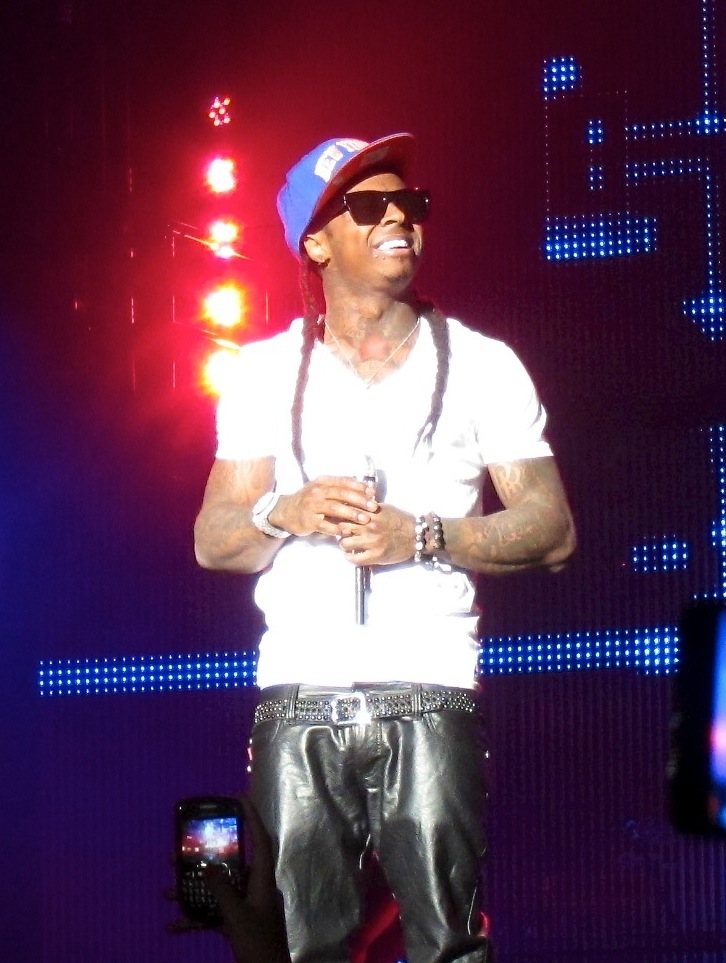
After separating from longtime partner Lil Wayne (pictured), Trina found new inspiration for the album's recording sessions.

Recording for Trina's fourth studio album began in 2007. In an interview with Billboard, Slip-N-Slide Records President Ted Lucas stated, "The songs selected for the album were tracks ladies needed to hear—about maturing and keeping focus... Her fans know she's rough and they like that. So she's back with a little of that, but she's matured as well."

Trina described the album's direction as experimental, citing her vocal approach on "Single Again" and the techno-influenced production of "Crash My Party" as primary examples. She revealed that the energy surrounding the project was different because it marked her first release since her highly publicized breakup with American rapper Lil Wayne. Although she viewed the relationship as a "beautiful experience" that showcased a different side of her personality, she noted that the split forced her to view her music through a new perspective:

I just think it's because of the place I'm in. I'm happy. I feel good about going into the studio on this project after the change from Atlantic [Records] and with all the issues from the label's side. When it came down to the actual production and putting the album together, I was in a more peaceful place. Just the production from everyone from Scott Storch to Cool & Dre—the producers I've been working with have been bringing it out of me.

Following the release of the lead single, speculation arose that the album would be titled Da Baddest Bitch II. The title was eventually finalized as Still da Baddest. Originally scheduled for a February 12, 2008, release, the date was later pushed back to April 1, 2008.

== Music and lyrics ==
"I think definitely the first single ['Single Again'] with me singing on the hook. That was so different... I went from humming along in my head to making it a reality out loud. And when I sang the hook, everybody was like, 'Oh that's crazy!' It was a lot of fun for me."

— Trina, discussing the album's vocal direction

Critics noted that the production of Still da Baddest mirrors the aesthetic of late-1990s Bad Boy Records releases, featuring frequent guest appearances and varied track styles to maintain momentum. Reviewers observed that while Trina's lyrics remained focused on her established provocative persona, her vocal delivery showed more "effort" and "consistency" compared to previous works. Discussing the track "Look Back at Me", Nathan S. of DJBooth noted that "[i]n the age of reality TV and internet porn, it's almost impossible to shock the public anymore, but Trina gives it her best shot," while also observing her "surprisingly subdued" verses on the album's R&B-leaning tracks.

"Single Again" utilizes a rapid-fire tempo and rap-singing style influenced by the Timbaland production era. The album's lyrical content balances themes of romantic affection with assertive sexual empowerment. On "I Got a Thang for You", featuring Keyshia Cole, Trina explores unrequited love, referencing celebrity couples such as Brad Pitt and Angelina Jolie. Collaborative tracks play a significant role throughout; Missy Elliott appears on "I Got a Bottle," while Pitbull contributes to "Stop Traffic." Additionally, Rick Ross features on "Hot Commodity," which includes a melodic homage to the hip-hop classic "La Di Da Di" in its chorus.

== Promotion ==
Preceding the album's release, Slip-N-Slide Records ran ads on internet dating sites and sponsored blind-date contests on radio stations across the country, in reference to the album's lead single, "Single Again." Trina also launched a radio and retail promo tour beginning January 10, 2008.

== Singles ==
The album's lead single, "Single Again", was released on the US iTunes Store on November 6, 2007. The track, which was originally set to feature Christina Milian, features Trina singing the song's hook and second verse. It was accompanied by a music video that premiered on February 10, 2008. "Single Again" peaked on the US Billboard Hot Rap Songs and Hot R&B/Hip-Hop Songs charts at numbers 19 and 59, respectively.

"I Got a Thang for You", featuring R&B singer Keyshia Cole, was released as the album's second single. It also received an accompanying music video. The single peaked at number 59 on the Hot R&B/Hip-Hop Songs chart.

"Look Back at Me", featuring Killer Mike, was released as the album's third and final single, alongside a music video.

== Khia controversy ==
Following the album's release, rapper Khia purchased a copy at a local Target and posted a negative review on her official Myspace page. While their feud had been quiet prior to the album's release, Khia subsequently published multiple blog posts criticizing the project and making derogatory remarks about a 2006 miscarriage Trina had experienced with then-partner Lil Wayne. She wrote: "U STILL THE HOE U ALWAYS BEEN. AND HOES DONT GET NO RESPECT!!!!!! PUPPETTTTTT!!!! [sic]."

Although Trina did not directly respond to Khia's remarks, she was asked in an interview by Rajul Punjabi about the lack of female rappers in the industry, stating:

I think I'd go hard either way. Competition is always great... There aren't that many female artists, but the ones that are in the business, I love and respect them. From Lil' Kim to Missy to Eve to Shawnna, everyone is doing their own thing... We need that unity from the females and we need to join forces and make records together.

— Trina

Trina later included the bonus track "You Ain't Nothing" on the iTunes version of the album, which was widely interpreted as a diss track aimed at Khia.

== Critical reception ==
Professional ratings
Review scores
Source	Rating
AllMusic	3.5/5 stars
AllHipHop	Mixed
DJBooth	3.5/5 stars
RapReviews	6.5/10
Vibe	Favorable

Still da Baddest received generally positive reviews from critics, most of whom favored Trina's signature raunchy rap styling over her softer side. Awarding the album three-and-a-half stars, David Jeffries of AllMusic praised the album for capturing the raw edge found on the rapper's debut album with a modern twist, but had mixed emotions on the album's ability to duplicate the success found in "Here We Go" (2005). Jeffries continued his review by noting "I Got a Thang for You" and "Wish I Never Met You" as the album's main flaws, referencing them as "manufactured 'Here We Go' clones" dragging down what would otherwise be an entirely successful full-length. Jeffries ended his review by stating "It's the abundance of these brassy, 'love me or hate me' moments that make Still Da Baddest a step in the right direction and one of her better efforts, even with the woefully uninspired ballads."

Praising Trina's appealing curves, frank attitude, and seductive songs, Jason Seifer of Walmart praised Trina's raunchy style, stating: "Any concerns Trina had about being reduced in rank or status are quickly squashed within the span of a dozen tracks, leaving Katrina Taylor the freedom to get a little more personal with her audience." Seifer went on to compliment Trina's softer side on the Keyshia Cole-assisted "I Got a Thang for You," later showing great appreciation for the album's tracks that featured additional rappers and vocalists.

Praising Trina as one of the few prominent female rappers of the era, Alex Thornton of HipHopDX noted that although Still da Baddest isn't a huge leap for Trina in terms of subject matter, more effort had obviously been put into this album than any of her past releases. Thornton went on to state that portions of the album are ultimately forgettable since much of the work borrows from recent pop and hip-hop successes by other artists, but noted that since it was never intended to be an artsy offering, the formulaic approach wasn't a major problem. Aisha Johnson of AllHipHop noted that the album lacks true substance and fails to go beyond her sexually aggressive commentary. While praising Trina's fiery southern flow alongside guest appearances from Missy, Keyshia Cole, and Rick Ross, Johnson felt the LP didn't compare to the rapper's debut, Da Baddest Bitch. Calling her the "Queen Victoria of Rap," Evelyn McDonnell of Vibe praised the album for proving Trina is not a "one trick pony," highlighting standout tracks like "Clear It Out," "Single Again", "Look Back At Me," and "Wish I Never Met You."

== Commercial performance ==
Still da Baddest debuted at number six on the US Billboard 200 for the week ending April 19, 2008, selling 47,000 copies in its first week. This marked Trina's first top-ten album on the chart. Additionally, the album debuted at number one on both the US Top R&B/Hip-Hop Albums and Top Rap Albums charts during that same week.

== Track listing ==
The album track listing was revealed through pre-order on Amazon.com.

No.	Title	Writer(s)	Producer(s)	Length
1.	"Intro"	Chris "UNO" Chancelor	Chancelor	1:01
2.	"Still Da Baddest"	Katrina Taylor; Anthony Sears; Reginald Saunders	Young Sears	2:52
3.	"Killing You Hoes"	Algernod Washington; Brandon Lamela; Ronell Levatte; Alexander Martin; Taylor	Villa Nova; B-Sides	3:33
4.	"Single Again"	Taylor; Elvin Prince; Kevin Belnavis; Jean Borges	J-Roc	3:24
5.	"Look Back at Me" (featuring Killer Mike)	Taylor; J. Roper; T. Bonnie; Saunders; Michael Render	J-Roc	4:13
6.	"I Got a Thang for You" (featuring Keyshia Cole)	Taylor; Johnny Hernandez; Greg Oree; Saunders; Cole	Kane da Kameleon	3:34
7.	"I Got a Bottle" (featuring Missy Elliott)	Taylor; J. Roper; T. Bonnie; Kimberlie Row; Elliott; Amanda Perez	Hard Hat Productions	3:32
8.	"Wish I Never Met You" (featuring Shonie)	Taylor; Steven Scipio; Shonie Osumanu; James Scheffer	Jim Jonsin	4:06
9.	"Clear It Out"	Taylor; Melissa West; Ronald Ferebee; Josh Burke	Young Yonny	3:26
10.	"Stop Traffic" (featuring Pitbull)	Armando Perez; Scheffer	Jonsin	3:27
11.	"Phone Sexx" (featuring Qwote)	Taylor; Jimmy Leonard; Steve Obas; Saunders	Obas	4:08
12.	"Hot Commodity" (featuring Rick Ross)	Taylor; William Roberts; Tony Castillo	Gorilla Tek	3:54
Total length:				37:01

Walmart bonus track
No.	Title	Writer(s)	Producer(s)	Length
13.	"Don't Go" (featuring Qwote)	Taylor; Leonard; Obas; Saunders	Obas	3:21
Total length:				40:22

iTunes Store and international digital bonus track
No.	Title	Writer(s)	Producer(s)	Length
13.	"You Ain't Nothing"	Taylor; William Matlock III; Theodore Lucas; Burke; Saunders	Matlock	3:12
Total length:				40:13

Best Buy bonus tracks
No.	Title	Writer(s)	Producer(s)	Length
13.	"Grey Goose"			3:30
14.	"Crash My Party"	Taylor • Prince • Belnavis • Borges	J-Roc	3:31
15.	"You Ain't Nothing"	Taylor • Matlock III • Lucas • Burke • Saunders	Matlock	3:12
Total length:				47:14

Special edition bonus tracks
No.	Title	Writer(s)	Producer(s)	Length
13.	"Crash My Party"	Taylor • Prince • Belnavis • Borges	J-Roc	3:31
14.	"I Got a Problem" (featuring Plies & Chris J)	Washington • Lamela • Levatte • Martin	Villa Nova & B-Sides	5:36
15.	"Lame"	Taylor • Saunders • Burke	Young Yonny	4:52
Total length:				51:06

== Personnel ==
Credits for Still da Baddest adapted from AllMusic.

Performance

- Katrina "Trina" Taylor – primary artist, vocals, writer, executive producer
- Keyshia Cole – primary artist
- Killer Mike – primary artist
- Missy Elliott – primary artist
- Pitbull – primary artist
- Qwote – primary artist
- Rick Ross – primary artist
- Shonie – primary artist

Technical

- Musa "Milk" Adeoye – A&R
- Josh "Redd" Burke – A&R, executive producer
- Dru Castro – engineer
- Krishna Das – mixing
- Seth Firkins – mixing
- Matthew Zeek Harris – engineer
- Eldwardo "Eddie Mix" Hernandez – engineer
- Jim Jonsin – producer
- Jay Roc "Hard Hat Productions" – producer
- Big Tom aka Chevy Boy "Hard Hat Productions" – producer
- Jonathan Mannion – photography
- A. Martin – composer
- Steve Obas – engineer, producer
- A.C. Perez – composer
- Karen "KD" Douglas – creative direction
- Lili Picou – art direction, design
- James Scheffer – composer
- Ray Seay – mixing
- Max Unruh – mixing assistant
- Reginald Saunders – 2ThePointMusic
- Nadine Vendryes – make-up

== Charts ==
=== Weekly charts ===
Weekly chart performance for Still da Baddest
Chart (2008)	Peak position
US Billboard 200	6
US Top R&B/Hip-Hop Albums (Billboard)	1
US Top Rap Albums (Billboard)	1

=== Year-end charts ===
Year-end chart performance for Still da Baddest
Chart (2008)	Position
US Top R&B/Hip-Hop Albums (Billboard)	50
US Top Rap Albums (Billboard)	20
