= I Got a Thang for You =

Single by Trina featuring Keyshia Cole

from the album Still da Baddest
- Released: February 19, 2008
- Recorded: 2007
- Genre: Hip hop; R&B
- Length: 3:35
- Label: Slip-n-Slide; DP Entertainment; EMI; Capitol
- Songwriters: Keyshia Cole; Hernandez; Greg Oree; Reginald Saunders; Katrina Taylor; Daniel Johnson
- Producer: Kane Beatz

Trina singles chronology
"Single Again" (2007)	"I Got a Thang for You" (2008)	"Look Back at Me" (2008)

Keyshia Cole singles chronology
"I Remember" (2007)	"I Got a Thang for You" (2008)	"Heaven Sent" (2008)

Music video
- " I Got A Thang For You" on YouTube

"I Got a Thang for You" is the second single from Miami-based rapper Trina's fourth album Still da Baddest. The song features American R&B singer Keyshia Cole. It was chosen after much speculation and talk about the second single. The song was produced by Kane Beatz, while the chorus was written by Midus, both of Slick Salt Entertainment. It was originally intended for New Orleans rapper Curren$y.

In 2024, the song was made popular again on video-sharing app TikTok.

== Release ==
Trina was on MTV's Sucker Free and confirmed "I Got a Thang for You" was chosen as the second single. The song was released in February 2008 and shipped to radios. It can currently be streamed via Trina's MySpace page and YouTube. The video debuted on BET's 106 & Park on May 9, 2008 as the new joint of the day.

== Music video ==
The video begins with Trina asking her audience if they have ever hidden their emotions from a male that they have been attracted to. Trina's love interest, Thomas Jones from the New York Jets, then walks into a hotel, then switching to scenes of Keyshia singing with Trina. Afterwards, Trina leaves from an elevator as her male interest enters the same one she had left. As they walk by one another, the look into each other's eyes and continue to pass by one another. Trina and Keyshia inside another house and sit on a couch laughing amongst one another. A few scenes are shown with hip hop model Toccara Jones opening her mailbox and Trina leaving the house. The camera then switches to the male putting on his clothes. During the bridge, Keyshia sings, and the male interest enters Trina's house and he opens her lime green trench coat and touches her body. The video fades out with Trina and Keyshia making seductive motions, gesturing that they want to be caressed, and pointing to the camera.

== Charts ==
Chart (2008)	Peak Position
U.S. Billboard Bubbling Under Hot 100 Singles	21
U.S. Billboard Hot R&B/Hip-Hop Songs	59
