= Da Baddest Bitch (song) =

1999 single by Trina

Single by Trina

from the album Da Baddest Bitch
- Released: December 22, 1999
- Genre: Miami bass
- Length: 3:15
- Label: Slip-N-Slide; Atlantic
- Songwriter: Katrina Taylor
- Producer: Black Mob Group

Trina singles chronology
"Shut Up" (1999)	"Da Baddest Bitch" (1999)	"Pull Over" (2000)

Music video
- "Da Baddest Bitch" on YouTube

"Da Baddest Bitch" is a song by American rapper Trina, released on December 22, 1999 as the lead single from her debut studio album of the same name (2000). Produced by Black Mob Group, it contains a sample of "Bad" by Michael Jackson.

== Composition ==
"Da Baddest Bitch" is a Miami bass-influenced song. The hook borrows from Michael Jackson's "Bad", using the lyrics "Who's bad?" Trina performs in a "slow and steady Florida flow" and the lyrics find her making demands on her male partners.

== Critical reception ==
Michael Gallucci of AllMusic regarded the song as among the tracks from Da Baddest Bitch that "keep the momentum relatively steady." Steve "Flash" Juon of RapReviews wrote in his review of the album, "You can't get much more crass than Trina does on the title track", before commenting "Trina really IS Da Baddest Bitch – and you know what, it's kinda fresh."

== Charts ==
Chart (2000)	Peak position
US Hot R&B/Hip-Hop Songs (Billboard)	64
US R&B/Hip-Hop Airplay (Billboard)	57
US R&B/Hip-Hop Streaming Songs(Billboard)	94
US Mainstream R&B/Hip-Hop Airplay (Billboard)	32
