= Single Again (Trina song) =

Single by Trina

from the album Still da Baddest
- Released: October 23, 2007
- Recorded: 2007
- Genre: Hip hop; R&B
- Length: 3:27
- Label: Slip-N-Slide; Capitol; EMI
- Songwriters: Katrina Taylor; Elvin Prince; Jean "J Rock" Borges
- Producer: Borges

Trina singles chronology
"Go Girl" (2007)	"Single Again" (2007)	"I Got a Thang for You" (2008)

Music video
- "Single Again" on YouTube

"Single Again" is a song by American rapper Trina, released on October 23, 2007 as the lead single from her fourth album Still da Baddest (2008).

== Background ==
Before releasing the track, Trina told Billboard: "I'm stepping my game up like 10 notches..." When asked about what fans may find surprising to hear, she responded, "I think definitely [“Single Again”] with me singing on the hook. That was so different. I was in the studio like, 'Okay, I'm not a singer so what am I doing?' But I went from humming along in my head to making it a reality out loud. And when I sang the hook, everybody was like, 'Oh that's crazy!' It was a lot of fun for me."

== Release ==
The original version of the track was stolen from Slip-N-Slide Records and subsequently leaked to the internet. Christina Milian sang the chorus on the original, but for unknown reasons, Trina confirmed that the version with Milian would not make the album.

== Music video ==
A contest was held for fans to be in the video. There were two categories to enter in, and two winners were chosen. The winners were chosen by fans. The video was shot on location in Miami on December 28, 2007. The video was directed by Billie Woodruff. It was shot at the FrostShot Mansion in Miami, Florida. The company sponsored the video by inserting its Frozen Liquor Shot, FROSTSHOT.

The video premiered on February 11, 2008 on Yahoo! Music. It consisted of a wedding, in which Trina is the bride who discovers her soon to be husband was cheating on her with another woman. She then leaves him at the altar. Further shots consist of Trina with friends at the pool, as well as attempts from her man to reconcile, but to no avail, as Trina throws the phone into the pool. The video then cuts to Trina dancing in a hall surrounded by curtains and at a party with friends. The video then fades to black.

== Remixes ==
The official remix features Lil Wayne, Rick Ross, Plies and a new verse by Trina. Wayne dated Trina on and off from early 2005 until summer 2007 (and is speculated to be the topic of the song), and in his verse he says that he believes the two will get back together eventually.

== Charts ==
Chart (2008)	Peak position
US Bubbling Under Hot 100 (Billboard)	25
US Hot R&B/Hip-Hop Songs (Billboard)	59
US Rhythmic Airplay (Billboard)	29
