= Glamorest Life =

Studio album by Trina
- Released: October 4, 2005
- Studio: Circle House Studios (Miami, FL); Studio Center (Miami, FL); The Record Room (Miami, FL)
- Genre: Hip hop
- Length: 47:23
- Label: Slip-N-Slide; Atlantic
- Producer: Bigg D; Briss; Cool & Dre; Jazze Pha; Jim Jonsin; KLC; Mannie Fresh; Money Mark Diggla; Needlz; Nick Fury; Signature

Trina chronology
Diamond Princess (2002)	Glamorest Life (2005)	Still da Baddest (2008)

Singles from Glamorest Life
- 1. "Don't Trip" Released: April 28, 2005; 2. "Here We Go" Released: September 23, 2005; 3. "Da Club" Released: November 22, 2005

Glamorest Life is the third studio album by American rapper Trina. It was released on October 4, 2005, through Slip-N-Slide/Atlantic Records. The recording sessions took place at Studio Center, The Record Room and Circle House Studios in Miami. The album was produced by Bigg D, Cool & Dre, Jim Jonsin, Mannie Fresh, Money Mark Diggla, Signature, Briss, Jazze Pha, KLC, Needlz, and Nick "Fury" Loftin. It features guest appearances from Dre, CO, Duece Poppito, Jazze Pha, Kelly Rowland, Lil Scrappy, Lil Wayne, Mannie Fresh, Money Mark Diggla, Plies, Rick Ross, Snoop Dogg, T.I., Trey Songz, and Trick Daddy. The album marks Trina's final album for Atlantic Records. In 2007, Trina signed to EMI in conjunction with Slip-n-Slide Records.

== Promotion ==
The album was supported with three singles: "Don't Trip", "Here We Go" and "Da Club". Its lead single, "Don't Trip", didn't find much success, only peaking at number 74 on the US Hot R&B/Hip-Hop Songs chart. The second single off of the album, "Here We Go", reached number 17 in Finland, New Zealand and the US, number 15 in the UK and number 29 in the Netherlands, and was certified Gold by the Recording Industry Association of America for selling over 500,000 units in the United States alone, becoming Trina's first highly successful single.

== Critical reception ==
Professional ratings
Review scores
Source	Rating
AllMusic	2.5/5 stars
HipHopDX	3/5
IGN	5/10
RapReviews	7.5/10

Steve 'Flash' Juon of RapReviews praised the album, stating that "the guest appearances don't detract from her album, they just add on to her already strong pimp game". Melanie Cornish of HipHopDX concluded: "all in all Trina didn't strike out with her third album, it was a certified hit and will keep her fan base watching for the next time she comes to the plate". AllMusic's Andy Kellman found Trina's "righteous raunchiness is more than a little exhausted on Glamorest Life", adding that she sounds "distanced and not nearly as energised as she was on 2002's Diamond Princess". Jim Durig of IGN wrote that the album "doesn't expand on the glimmers of potential Trina showed in her earlier work, instead moving away from that strong, uninhibited rawness to fully pander to an adolescent crowd".

== Commercial performance ==
In the United States, the album debuted at number 11 on the Billboard 200 and number 2 on both the Top R&B/Hip-Hop Albums and the Top Rap Albums charts, with 77,000 units sold in its first week. By 2007, the album sold 398,000 copies.

== Track listing ==
Glamorest Life track listing
No.	Title	Writer(s)	Producer(s)	Length
1.	"Sum Mo" (featuring Dre)	Clifford Harris; Andre Lyon; Marcello Valenzano	Cool & Dre	3:36
2.	"Don't Trip" (featuring Lil Wayne)	Katrina Taylor; Dwayne Carter, Jr.; Byron Thomas; Mark Seymour	Mannie Fresh	3:28
3.	"Shake" (featuring Lil Scrappy)	Darryl Richardson; Craig Lawson; Richard Jones	KLC	4:05
4.	"Here We Go" (featuring Kelly Rowland)	Teedra Moses; James Scheffer; Derrick Baker	Jim Jonsin; Bigg D	3:50
5.	"Sexy Gurl" (featuring Snoop Dogg, CO, and Money Mark Diggla)	Taylor; Calvin Broadus; Corey Evans; Seymour; Eugene Colon	Signature; Money Mark Diggla	3:45
6.	"Da Club" (featuring Mannie Fresh)	Thomas; Kedrick Moore; Evans	Mannie Fresh	3:51
7.	"It's Your B-Day" (featuring Jazze Pha)	Taylor; Phalon Alexander; Seymour	Jazze Pha	3:28
8.	"I Gotta" (featuring Rick Ross)	William Leonard Roberts II; Andre Brissett	Briss	3:09
9.	"Throw It Back" (featuring Duece Poppi)	Taylor; Lasana Smith; Khari Cain	Needlz	3:12
10.	"50/50 Love" (featuring Trey Songz)	Taylor; Nathaniel Perez; Tremaine Neverson; Maurice Young; Kenneth Gamble; Leon Huff; Robert Kelly	Happy Perez	3:01
11.	"So Fresh" (featuring Plies)	Taylor; Algernod Washington; Scheffer; Baker; Seymour; Jones	Jim Jonsin; Bigg D	4:01
12.	"Reach Out"	Nicholaus Loftin; Jones; Seth Ibarrondo	Nick Fury; Mike Caren (co.)	3:42
13.	"Lil Mama" (featuring Dre)	Taylor; Lyon; Valenzano; Timothy Christian Riley; Raphael Wiggins; D'Wayne Wiggins; D. Clark	Cool & Dre	4:12
Total length:				47:23

Bonus track
No.	Title	Writer(s)	Producer(s)	Length
14.	"Tonight" (featuring Money Mark Diggla)	Taylor; Seymour; Anthony David Galvin	Tony Galvin	4:12

Sample credits

- Track 4 contains interpolations from the composition "Tender Love", written by Jimmy Jam and Terry Lewis.
- Track 7 contains interpolations from the composition "Funk You Up", written by Gwendolyn Chisolm, Cheryl Cooke, Sylvia Robinson, and Angela Brown.
- Track 10 contains interpolations from the composition "When Somebody Loves You Back", written by Gamble and Huff, and interpolations from the composition "Not Gonna Hold On (To Your Love)", written by R. Kelly.
- Track 13 contains samples from the recording "(Lay Your Head on My) Pillow", written and performed by Tony! Toni! Toné!.

== Personnel ==
- Katrina "Trina" Taylor – vocals, co-executive producer
- Andre "Dré" Lyon – vocals, producer (tracks: 1, 13)
- Dwayne "Lil Wayne" Carter – vocals (track 2)
- Darryl "Lil Scrappy" Richardson – vocals (track 3)
- Kelly Rowland – vocals (track 4)
- Calvin "Snoop Dogg" Broadus – vocals (track 5)
- Corey "C.O." Evans – vocals (track 5)
- Mark "Money Mark Diggla" Seymour – vocals (track 5), producer (tracks: 5, 10)
- Byron "Mannie Fresh" Thomas – vocals (track 6), producer (tracks: 2, 6)
- Phalon "Jazze Pha" Alexander – vocals & producer (track 7)
- William "Rick Ross" Roberts II – vocals (track 8)
- Lasana "Duece Poppito" Smith – vocals (track 9)
- Tremaine "Trey Songz" Neverson – vocals (track 10)
- Algernod "Plies" Washington – vocals (track 11)
- Penelope Magnet – additional vocals (track 12)
- Derrick "Bigg D" Baker – piano (track 4), producer (tracks: 4, 11)
- Marcello "Cool" Valenzano – producer (tracks: 1, 13)
- Craig "KLC" Lawson – producer (track 3)
- James "Jim Jonsin" Scheffer – producer (tracks: 4, 11)
- Eugene "Signature" Colon – producer (tracks: 5, 10)
- Andre "Briss" Brissett – producer (track 8)
- Khari "Needlz" Cain – producer (track 9)
- Nicholaus "Nick Fury" Loftin – producer (track 12)
- Mike Caren – co-producer (track 12), A&R direction
- Andrews Correa – recording
- Robert "Big Briz" Brisbane – recording (tracks: 1, 13)
- Jon Neumann – recording (track 2)
- Zac – recording (track 3)
- Ray Seay – mixing (tracks: 1–3, 5, 6, 8–10, 12, 13)
- KD – mixing (track 4)
- Leslie Brathwrate – mixing (track 7)
- Fabian Marasciullo – mixing (track 11)
- Dave Junco – additional recording (tracks: 7–9)
- Brian "Big Bass" Gardner – mastering (tracks: 1–3, 5, 6, 8, 9)
- Bernie Grundman – mastering (tracks: 4, 7, 10–13)
- Ted "Touche" Lucas – executive producer
- Solomon "Sox" Hepburn – co-executive producer
- Josh "Redd" Burke – A&R, management
- Musa Adeoye – A&R
- Robert Alexander – A&R direction
- Alan Lewis – A&R direction
- Byron Trice – A&R direction
- Damon Eden – A&R co-direction
- Aaron Bay-Schuck – A&R coordinator
- Anne Declemente – A&R administrator
- Kram Iksirbo – art direction, design
- Alexander Martin – art direction
- Christian Lantry – photography
- Alexander Allen – stylist
- Andrew Zaeh – photoshoot production

== Charts ==
=== Weekly charts ===
Weekly chart performance for Glamorest Life
Chart (2005)	Peak position
US Billboard 200	11
US Top Rap Albums (Billboard)	2
US Top R&B/Hip-Hop Albums (Billboard)	2

=== Year-end charts ===
Year-end chart performance for Glamorest Life
Chart (2005)	Position
US Top R&B/Hip-Hop Albums (Billboard)	79
