= Diamond Princess (album) =

Studio album by Trina
- Released: August 27, 2002
- Length: 51:12
- Label: Slip-N-Slide; Atlantic
- Producer: Cool & Dre; Missy Elliott; Jim Jonsin; Just Blaze; Phat Pocket Productions; Signature; Timbaland; Kanye West

Trina chronology
Da Baddest Bitch (2000)	Diamond Princess (2002)	Glamorest Life (2005)

Singles from Diamond Princess
- 1. "No Panties" Released: July 16, 2002; 2. "B R Right" Released: October 22, 2002

Diamond Princess is the second album by American rapper Trina. It was released on August 27, 2002, through the Atlantic Records and Slip-N-Slide Records. The album debuted at number 14 on the US Billboard 200 and number 5 on the Top R&B/Hip-Hop Albums chart.

== Background ==
After promotion for her debut album ended in mid-2000, Trina began recording music with Missy Elliott to create her second album. Recording sessions lasted from 2000 to 2002. Trina was able to choose her own production, name of the songs, and write whatever she wanted. She told TheCrusade.net: "It's more what Trina's about, how Trina looks, how Trina feels, the things that Trina consists of."

== Singles ==
The lead single, "Told Y'all", featuring Rick Ross, produced by Cool & Dre, reached number 64 on the Hot R&B/Hip-Hop Songs chart, while a second single, "No Panties", featuring Tweet, released on July 16, 2002, only reached number 88 on the Hot R&B/Hip-Hop Songs chart. However, it became her first single to chart outside of the US, as it peaked at number 45 on the UK Singles Chart. The third and final single from the album, "B R Right", featuring Ludacris, produced by Kanye West, was also released on October 22, 2002 and reached number 83 on the Hot 100, number 50 the Hot R&B/Hip-Hop Songs chart and number 24 on the Rap Songs chart.

== Critical reception ==
Professional ratings
Review scores
Source	Rating
AllMusic	4/5 stars
HipHopDX	3.5/5 stars
RapReviews	7.5/10 stars
Rolling Stone	3/5 stars
Slant Magazine	1/5 stars
USA Today	2.5/4 stars

AllMusic editor Rovi Staff found that "just as the title Diamond Princess suggests, Trina is a hard-edged jewel that shines with an uncanny brilliance." Billboard wrote that "though not perfect, Diamond Princess proves that Trina, like the album's gem namesake, is pretty, shiny, and stronger than you might think." Rolling Stone described the album as "a collection of unusually complex hip-hop fantasies" and felt that "Trina puts her choppy, workmanlike rhyme flow to good use," while Rhapsody's Brolin Winning wrote that "Trina continues her reign on album number two, dropping another slew of X-rated, female-power rhymes over rambunctious beats galore." Less impressed, Sal Cinquemani from Slant Magazine found that Diamond Princess was "probably the most uninspired hip-hop record of the year."

== Commercial performance ==
The album debuted at number 14 on the US Billboard 200 and number 5 on the Top R&B/Hip-Hop Albums chart, selling 67,000 units in its first week. By June 2007, Diamond Princess had sold up to 501,000 copies according to Billboard.

== Track listing ==
Diamond Princess track listing
No.	Title	Writer(s)	Producer(s)	Length
1.	"Intro (Sommore)"	Lori Ann Rambough		0:52
2.	"Hustling"	Katrina Taylor; Mark Seymour; O'Shea Jackson	Signature	2:55
3.	"Told Y'all" (featuring Rick Ross)	Taylor; William Roberts; Andre Lyon; Marcello Valenzano	Cool & Dre	3:15
4.	"Rewind That Back" (featuring Missy Elliott)	Taylor; Elliott	Supa	3:16
5.	"B R Right" (featuring Ludacris)	Taylor; Roberts; Kanye West; Christopher Bridges	West	4:22
6.	"U & Me"	Taylor; Roberts; Lyon; Valenzano; Bunny Sigler; Louise Bishop	Cool & Dre	4:07
7.	"Busted Skit"		Charles for Phat Pocket Productions	1:57
8.	"Nasty Bitch" (featuring Money Mark Diggla)	Taylor; Seymour	Signature	2:35
9.	"No Panties" (featuring Tweet)	Elliott	Missy Elliott; Nisan Stewart	2:43
10.	"I Wanna Holla" (featuring Deuce Poppi)	Taylor; Lasana Smith	Jim Jonsin	3:13
11.	"How We Do?" (featuring Fabolous)	Taylor; John Jackson; Smith	Just Blaze	3:19
12.	"Kandi" (featuring Lil Brianna)	Taylor; Smith; Maurice Starr; Michael Jonzun; Larry Johnson; Michael Johnson	Jim Jonsin	3:10
13.	"Ladies 1st" (featuring Eve)	Taylor; Eve Jeffers; Smith	Cool & Dre	3:31
14.	"Get This Money"	Enrique K. Garcia; Taylor	Jonsin	3:51
15.	"100%"	Taylor; Roberts; Lyon; Valenzano	Cool & Dre	4:14
16.	"Do You Want Me?" (featuring Bathgate)	Taylor; Smith; West; Lionel Evans	West	3:41
17.	"Outro (Sommore)"	Rambough		0:21
Total length:				51:12

Sample credits

- "Hustling" contains a sample of "No More?" by Eazy-E.
- "U & Me" contains a sample of "You and Me" by The O'Jays.
- "Kandi" contains a sample of "Candy Girl" by New Edition.
- "Get This Money" contains a sample of "Conga" by Miami Sound Machine.

== Personnel ==
Credits for Diamond Princess adapted from AllMusic.

- Missy Elliott: Producer
- Paul Gregory: Assistant Engineer
- Brian Kraz: Assistant Engineer
- Ray Seay: Engineer
- Signature: Producer
- Alvin Speights: Mixing
- Kanye West: Producer
- Young Guru: Engineer

== Charts ==
=== Weekly charts ===
Weekly chart performance for Diamond Princess
Chart (2002)	Peak position
US Billboard 200	14
US Top R&B/Hip-Hop Albums (Billboard)	5

=== Year-end charts ===
Year-end chart performance for Diamond Princess
Chart (2002)	Position
US Top R&B/Hip-Hop Albums (Billboard)	96
