= Pull Over (song) =

2000 single by Trina

Single by Trina

from the album Da Baddest Bitch
- Released: February 13, 2000
- Length: 3:14
- Label: Slip-N-Slide; Atlantic
- Songwriters: Katrina Taylor; Maurice Marshall; Adam Duggins; Lasana Smith; Marlon Hassanali
- Producer: Righteous Funk Boogie

Trina singles chronology
"Da Baddest Bitch" (1999)	"Pull Over" (2000)	"That's Cool" (2001)

Music video
- "Pull Over" on YouTube

"Pull Over" is a song by American rapper Trina, released on February 13, 2000, as the second single from her debut studio album Da Baddest Bitch (2000). It features additional vocals from American rapper Trick Daddy and was produced by Righteous Funk Boogie.

== Critical reception ==
In 2013, Complex ranked the song at number 27 in their list "Top 50 Best Rap Songs by Women". Jessie Schiewe of SF Weekly considered it the best song from Da Baddest Bitch, writing it "showcases Trina's whiplash rapping abilities, her Southern, sassy voice, and her clever, au courant lyrics."

== Live performances ==
In 2001, Trina performed the song during a makeover segment on The Jenny Jones Show.

== Charts ==
Chart (2000)	Peak position
US Billboard Hot 100	93
US Hot R&B/Hip-Hop Songs (Billboard)	49
US Hot Rap Songs (Billboard)	41
US Rhythmic Airplay (Billboard)	29
