= Bigg D =

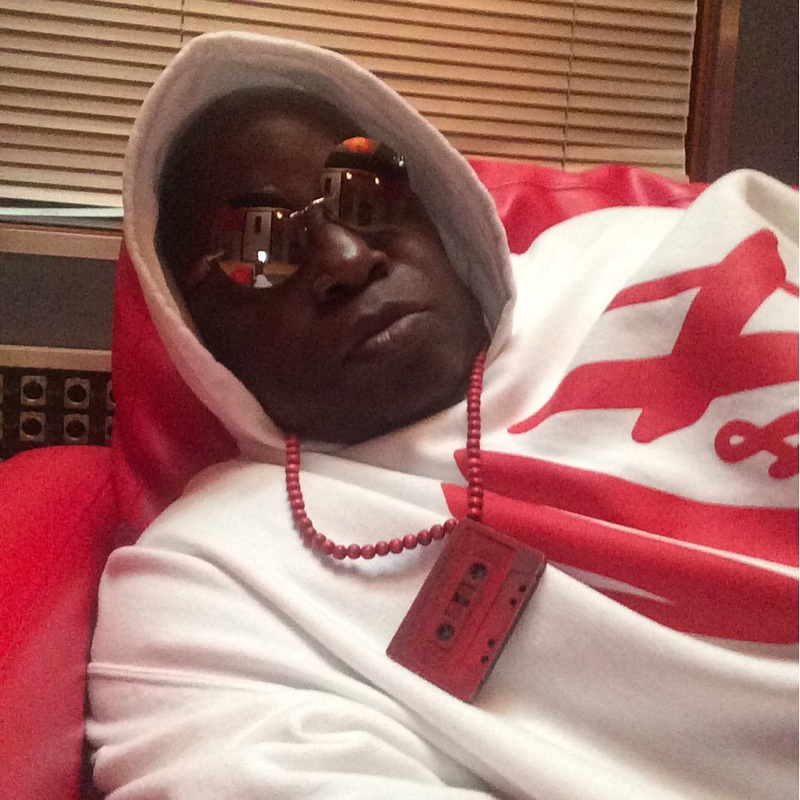
- Bigg D in 2015

Background information
- Also known as: Bigg D
- Born: Derrick Baker; 1972 (age 53–54); Liberty City, Miami, Florida
- Genres: Hip hop, R&B, pop, rock
- Occupations: Record producer, guitarist, songwriter
- Instruments: Guitar, drums, keyboards
- Label: Dadetown Entertainment Universal

Derrick Baker, professionally known as Bigg D, is an American producer from Miami, Florida.

== Biography ==
Born in Miami, Baker grew up in Carol City, his father a professional musician, and his mother a church pianist. He learned guitar and toured with BeBe & CeCe Winans and Shirley Caesar in the 1980s. He had always wanted to work as a producer, and began producing rap artists such as G-Shorties. He went on to produce for artists such as The Rich Collective, Pitbull, Lil Wayne, Rick Ross, Jay-Z, Jennifer Lopez, and Jamie Foxx.

In 2006 he won the award for 'Songwriter of the Year' with Mariah Carey at the 2006 BMI Urban Music Awards.

== Production discography ==
- Jay Burna
  - "Mood"
- Dillan Grey - Painted Asylum (2015)
  - "Talk This Way"
  - "Addicted To Crazy"
- Ludacris - Burning Bridges / Ludaversal (2014/2015)
  - "In My Life" (feat. John Legend)
- 4th N Ocean
  - "Peyton Manning"
  - "Bussin' It"
  - "Mula"
  - "Birthday Suit"
- R Kelly
  - "Special Delivery"
- Pleasure P - Break Up To Make Up (2014)
  - "Letter To My Ex"
  - "Sex Mechanic"
  - "Changes"
- Sebastian Mikael - Speechless (2014)
  - "Last Night" Feat. Wale
  - "Forever"
  - "Speechless"
  - "4 U" (feat. Rick Ross)
- B-Smyth (2013/2014)
  - "Twerkoholic"
- Bryan J
  - "Caught Up" (feat. Tyga)
- The Rich Collective - "Long Lost But Remembered" (2013)
  - "M.A." with Richard Clarvit
- Benzino - (2012)
  - "Oh What A Night" (feat. Stevie J)
  - "How Deep Is Your Love"
- Trina - Back 2 Business (2012)
  - "Petty"
- Mack Maine - (2012)
  - "Celebrate" (feat. Lil Wayne & Talib Kweli)
- Chris Brown - F.A.M.E. (2011)
  - Wet the Bed (feat. Ludacris )
- Rick Ross
  - "Luxurious" (feat. Scotty Boi & Terry Bennett)
- Glasses Malone - Beach Cruiser (2009)
  - "Sun Come Up" (feat. T-Pain, Rick Ross & Birdman)
- Rick Ross - Deeper Than Rap (2009)
  - "Murder Mami" (feat. Foxy Brown)
- Charlie Wilson - Uncle Charlie (2009)
  - "One Time"
- Git Fresh - (2008)
  - "Booty Music"
  - "Booty Music Part 2"
  - "Tipsy" (feat. Rick Ross)
- Chris Brown - Exclusive (2007)
  - "Down (feat. Kanye West)"
- Jay-Z - American Gangster (2007)
  - "Hello Brooklyn 2.0 (feat. Lil' Wayne)"
- Jennifer Lopez - Brave (2007)
  - "Wrong When Your Gone"
- Playaz Circle - Supply & Demand (2007)
  - "Outlaw'"
- J. Valentine - Conversation Piece (2007)
  - "Get With This Pimpin (feat. Snoop Dogg')"
- Mario - Unrealesed track from GO (2007)
  - "This is For"
- Jamie Foxx - Unpredictable (2005)
  - "Unpredictable (feat. Ludacris)"
- Bottom of Da Map - "Undisclosed"
  - "Whats da Bizness"
- Pretty Ricky - "Bluestars"
  - "Your Body"
  - "Grind on Me"
  - "Get A Little Closer"
  - "Never Let You Go"
  - "Juicy"
  - "Call Me"
  - "Nothing but a Number"
  - "Grill 'Em"
  - "Get You Right"
  - "Chevy"
  - "I Want You (Girlfriend)"
  - "Shorty Be Mine"
  - "Cant Live Without You"
- Lil Wayne - "Tha Carter II"
  - "Best Rapper Alive"
- Lil Wayne - Tha Carter III Sessions
  - "Staring At The World"
- Trick Daddy - "Thug Matrimony" "Back By Thug Demand"
  - "Lets Go"
  - "So High (feat. Trey Songz and 8Ball)"
- Trick Daddy
  - "Yeah, Yeah, Yeah (Original Version)" [feat. Lil Wayne & DJ Khaled]
- Pitbull - "M.I.A.M.I."
  - "Damn It Man"
- Smitty - "Smitty Album"
  - "Tell Me (feat. Mario & Chris Brown)"
  - "For The Love of Money"
- Twista - "The Day After"
  - "Girl Tonite (feat. Trey Songz)"
- Mike Jones
  - "Cuddy Buddy"
- 8Ball & MJG - "Ridin High"
  - "Ridin High"
- Missy Elliott - "I'm Better" (feat Lamb Litty)
- Missy Elliott - "I'm Better" Remix (feat. Lamb Litty, Trina, Eve, & Lil Kim)
- City Girls - "Period" (2018)
  - "Take Yo Man"
  - "Where The Bag At""
