= Da Baddest Bitch =

Studio album by Trina
- Released: March 21, 2000
- Length: 50:10
- Labels: Slip-n-Slide; Atlantic
- Producers: Bigg D; Black Mob Group; Hugo Boss; The Committee; Charles Harrison; Red Spyda; Righteous Funk Boogie; Leland Robinson; Spiderweb; Trina

Trina chronology
Da Baddest Bitch (2000)	Diamond Princess (2002)

Singles from Da Baddest Bitch
- 1. "Da Baddest Bitch" Released: December 22, 1999; 2. "Pull Over" Released: February 13, 2000

Da Baddest Bitch is the debut studio album by American rapper Trina. It was released on March 21, 2000, through Atlantic Records and Slip-n-Slide Records. Chiefly produced by Righteous Funk Boogie, the album debuted at number thirty-three on the US Billboard 200 and number eleven on the Top R&B/Hip-Hop Albums chart, and entered the Top R&B/Hip-Hop Catalog Albums in 2002.

== Singles ==
The album was preceded by the lead single "the title track" on December 22, 1999. The single failed to chart on any chart but the Hot R&B/Hip-Hop Songs chart, on which it reached number sixty-four.

The second and final single from the album, "Pull Over", was released on February 13, 2000, and reached number ninety-three on the Hot 100, number forty-six on the Hot R&B/Hip-Hop Songs chart and number forty-one on the Rap Songs chart.

== Critical reception ==
Professional ratings
Review scores
Source	Rating
AllMusic	2.5/5 stars
Entertainment Weekly	A−
RapReviews	6.5/10
Rolling Stone	2.0/5 stars
The Source	3/5 stars
Spin	7/10

Craig Seymour of Entertainment Weekly reviewed the album saying, "As nasty as Lil' Kim used to be, Trina boldly positions herself as the new queen of randy hip-hop tales in which sex is a contact sport played by rival genders. Spare Miami-bass beats provide the apt low end for her below-the-belt rhymes on Da Baddest Bitch. And a song about the pain of loving a violent, cash-obsessed thug shows that she's as skilled at speaking truths as she is at hawking fantasies." Rhapsody wrote about the album: "On her debut album she spits plenty of rah-rah about getting over on the fellas, but she does it exceptionally well. Hot flows and no-holds-barred rhymes make this some high-quality, dirty-ass freak rap."

Billboard says, "Rap divadom has a new challenger. Trina makes her solo debut with the single, "Da Baddest Bitch," off the album of the same name. The 21-year-old rapper, who made her debut on Trick Daddy's party anthem "Nann," proudly carries the torch lit by female MCs like Lil' Kim and Foxy Brown before her, as an artist not afraid to use her feminine wiles to get what she wants. The Miami bass-influenced track, produced by the Black Mob, has Trina making some serious demands on her men in a slow and steady Florida flow. The hook borrows liberally from Michael Jackson's classic "Bad," as it asks, "Who's bad?" Trina shows that female MCs can boast just like the big boys of rap."

== Commercial performance ==
Da Baddest Bitch debuted at number 33 on the US Billboard 200 and number 11 on the Top R&B/Hip-Hop Albums chart. In November 2000, it was certified gold by the Recording Industry Association of America (RIAA) for shipments figures in excess of 500,000 copies in the United States. The album would stay on the Billboard 200 chart for 29 weeks and on the Top Hip-Hop/R&B chart for 49 consecutive weeks in the United States. By June 2007, Da Baddest Bitch had sold 683,000 units in the US.

== Track listing ==
Da Baddest Bitch track listing
No.	Title	Writer(s)	Producer(s)	Length
1.	"The Big Lick" (featuring The Lost Tribe)	Katrina Taylor; Kase; Mystic; Fat	Hugo Boss	2:54
2.	"Da Baddest Bitch"	Taylor	Black Mob Group	3:15
3.	"If U With Me" (featuring Mystic of The Lost Tribe)	Taylor; Mystic	Charles Harrison; Leland Robinson	3:14
4.	"Hair Dresser Skit"		Taylor	0:36
5.	"Ain't Shit" (featuring Lois Lane)	Taylor; Lane	Righteous Funk Boogie	4:02
6.	"Off the Chain Wit It" (featuring Trick Daddy)	Maurice Young; Lasana Smith	Righteous Funk Boogie	4:15
7.	"69 Ways" (featuring J-Shin)	Taylor; Jonathan Shinoster	Spiderweb	2:41
8.	"Club Skit"		Taylor	1:12
9.	"Ball Wit Me" (featuring 24 Karatz)	Smith; Marlon Hassanali	The Committee	3:16
10.	"Watch Yo Back" (featuring Twista)	Taylor; Mark Seymour; Carl Mitchell	Righteous Funk Boogie	4:07
11.	"Off Glass" (featuring Deuce Poppi)	Taylor; Smith	Righteous Funk Boogie	3:38
12.	"Answering Machine Skit"		Taylor	0:39
13.	"I Don't Need You" (featuring Trick Daddy)	Taylor; Young	Black Mob Group	2:18
14.	"I Need" (featuring Tre-6)	Taylor; Seymour; Corey Evans	Righteous Funk Boogie	3:47
15.	"I'll Always"	Taylor; Chris Jasper; Ronald Isley; O'Kelly Isley Jr.; Ernest Isley; Marvin Isley	Bigg D	3:25
16.	"Mama" (featuring J.A.B.A.N. and J-Shin)	Taylor; Shinoster; Preslere Joseph	Righteous Funk Boogie	3:08
17.	"Take Me" (featuring Pamela Long)	Taylor; Long	Red Spyda	3:56
18.	"Pull Over"	Taylor; Maurice Marshall; Adam Duggins; Smith; Hassanali	Righteous Funk Boogie	3:14
Total length:				50:10

== Personnel ==
- Robert Alexander – art direction
- Derrick Baker – producer
- Richard Bates – art direction, photography
- Black Mob Group – producer
- Hugo Boss – producer
- Thomas Bricker – art direction, design
- Mike Caren – art direction
- Charles Harrison – producer
- Solomon "Sox" Hepburn – executive
- JV – engineer
- Alan Lewis – creative director
- Mr. Seay – mixing
- Deuce Poppito of 24 Karatz – performer
- Red Spyda – producer
- Righteous Funk Boogie – engineer, producer
- Leland Robinson – producer
- Alvin Speights – mixing
- Trick Daddy – performer
- Trina – liner notes
- Dwayne Webb – producer

== Charts ==
=== Weekly charts ===
Weekly chart performance for Da Baddest Bitch
Chart (2000)	Peak position
US Billboard 200	33
US Top R&B/Hip-Hop Albums (Billboard)	11

=== Year-end charts ===
Year-end chart performance for Da Baddest Bitch
Chart (2000)	Position
US Top R&B/Hip-Hop Albums (Billboard)	63

== Certifications ==
Certifications for Da Baddest Bitch
Region	Certification	Certified units/sales
United States (RIAA)	Gold	683,000
