= Here We Go (Trina song) =

2005 single by Trina

Single by Trina featuring Kelly Rowland

from the album Glamorest Life
- B-side: "Don't Trip", "Tonight"
- Released: September 23, 2005
- Studio: Studio Center (Miami)
- Length: 3:50
- Label: Slip-N-Slide; Atlantic
- Songwriters: James Harris III; Terry Lewis; Katrina Taylor; Derrick L. Baker; James Gregery Scheffer; Josh Burke; Steve Scipio; Ted Lucas; Teedra Moses
- Producer: Jim Jonsin

Trina singles chronology
"Don't Trip" (2005)	"Here We Go" (2005)	"Go Girl" (2007)

Kelly Rowland singles chronology
"Une femme en prison" (2003)	"Here We Go" (2005)	"Like This" (2007)

"Here We Go" is a song by American rapper Trina. Built around a sample from Force MDs's "Tender Love" (1985), it was produced by Jim Jonsin for her third album, Glamorest Life (2005), and features guest vocals by R&B singer Kelly Rowland. The song was released on September 23, 2005, as the album's second single and became Trina's first top 20 hit as a lead artist in the United States, staying on the Billboard Hot 100 for 20 weeks. Elsewhere released in April 2006, "Here We Go" also saw success in the United Kingdom and New Zealand, reaching number 15 in both countries. In the United States, the song was certified gold by the Recording Industry Association of America (RIAA) in 2006 for selling over 500,000 copies.

== Commercial performance ==
The song "Here We Go" by Trina and Kelly Rowland has been listed for 33 weeks in 4 different charts. Its first appearance was week 40/2005 in the US Singles Top 100 and the last appearance was week 22/2006 in the UK Singles Top 75. Its peak position was number 15, on the UK Singles Top 75, it stayed there for 1 week. Its highest entry was number 17 in the Finland Singles Top 20 and New Zealand Top 40.

== Music video ==
The music video was directed by Nick Quested. American professional basketball player Rasual Butler starred in the music video. Trina is on the phone to her love interest, tells him she has had enough of him and his infidelity and announces that the relationship is over. Kelly supports Trina, shows her photographs of her love interest and another woman spending quality time together in a restaurant and Trina is devastated. With the relationship being over, she decides to move out, empties his house, puts his possessions for sale and she and Kelly get on a cab and smile. Her love interest comes home in a taxi, enters his home, notices all his belongings and possessions are gone, finds an envelope on the floor and picks it up. As he opens it, he pulls out the photographs containing him and his mistress and is shocked to discover Trina found out about the affair. It is shown that the other woman is also the person who drives them away. As her love interest is looking at the photos a muscular man walks into the house and lunges to attack him.

== Remixes ==
In 2006, Trina included the official remix version of the song on her mixtape Rockstarr: The Baddest Bitch Reloaded, with a new verse from herself as well as a verse from Lil Wayne.

== Track listing ==
German CD single

1. "Here We Go" (Explicit Album Version) - 3:50
2. "Don't Trip" (Explicit Album Version) - 3:28
3. "Tonight" - 4:14
4. "Here We Go" (Video Version) - 3:50

Europe CD single

1. "Here We Go" (Radio Edit) - 3:36
2. "Here We Go" (Instrumental) - 3:50

UK CD single

1. "Here We Go" (Explicit Album Version) - 3:50
2. "Tonight" - 4:14

US CD single

1. "Here We Go" (Radio) - 3:50
2. "Here We Go" (Radio Edit) - 3:36
3. "Here We Go" (Instrumental) - 3:50
4. "Here We Go" (Explicit) - 3:50

12" vinyl

Side A

1. "Here We Go" (Explicit Album Version)
2. "Here We Go" (Amended Album Version)

Side B

1. "Here We Go" (Instrumental)
2. "Tonight"

== Charts ==
=== Weekly charts ===
2005–06 weekly chart performance for "Here We Go"
Chart (2005–06)	Peak position
Finland (Suomen virallinen lista)	17
Netherlands (Urban Top 100)	29
New Zealand (Recorded Music NZ)	17
Scottish Singles Sales (Official Charts)	28
UK Singles (Official Charts)	15
UK Hip Hop/R&B (Official Charts)	5
US Billboard Hot 100	17
US Hot R&B/Hip-Hop Songs (Billboard)	8
US Hot Rap Songs (Billboard)	3
US Pop Airplay (Billboard)	20
US Rhythmic Airplay (Billboard)	5

2010 weekly chart performance for "Here We Go"
Chart (2010)	Peak position
South Korea International (Circle)	100

=== Year-end charts ===
Year-end chart performance for "Here We Go"
Chart (2006)	Position
UK Singles (OCC)	225
US Hot R&B/Hip-Hop Songs (Billboard)	72

== Certifications ==
Certifications for "Here We Go"
Region	Certification	Certified units/sales
United States (RIAA)	Gold	500,000^{^}
^{^} Shipments figures based on certification alone.
