= Git Fresh =

American hip hop group

- Origin: Miami, Florida, U.S.
- Genres: R&B, hip hop, dance
- Years active: 2001–present
- Labels: Jive, Island Urban Music, Def Jam
- Members: Pretty $ly; Mike Ezay; Rude Boi; Penny
- Website: Git Fresh on Myspace

Git Fresh (formerly known as DeepSide) is an American R&B and hip hop group based in Miami, Florida. They are currently signed to Island Def Jam. The group was initially composed of Rude Boi, Pretty Sly, Penny, and Mike Ezay.

== History ==
=== Early years: DeepSide ===
The group started out and formed when all the members were in their teenage years, singing at talent shows and parties around the city. With the exception of Pretty Sly, who went to school in Miami, they all went to Dillard Performing Arts School. Rude Boi met Sly at a local talent show in Miami and introduced him to Mike and Penny. There was an immediate chemistry between the guys and they officially formed the group, DeepSide. Formerly signed to Jive Records, the group known as DeepSide changed their name after splitting from the label, and all old ties.

=== Git Fresh ===
The group changed their name from DeepSide to Git Fresh in 2008. They also changed record labels from Jive to Def Jam. Singers Brent "Penny" Pendergast and Mike "Ezay" Espinosa later reportedly left the group. As of 2012, it was uncertain if the two remaining members would continue as a group.

== Discography ==
- 2002: DeepSide
- 2008: Git Fresh
- 2011: Eat It Up

=== Singles ===
As DeepSide

- 2002: "Shook"
- 2002: "Shook" (remix)
- 2003: "Fantaszin'"
- 2005: "Coochie" (featuring Young Noah and Petey Pablo)
- 2005: "Hot Like an Oven" (featuring Juvenile)
- 2006: "Lovely" (from the Step Up soundtrack
- 2007: "Let's Make Love" (featuring Papoose)
- 2007: "What I Need"

As Git Fresh

- 2008: "Booty Music" (produced by T-Pain)
- 2008: "Like a Women"
- 2009: "Tipsy" (featuring Rick Ross)
- 2009: "SwaGG Up" (featuring Jamie Foxx and Rick Ross)
- 2010: "She Be Like (Bom Bom Bom)"
- 2010: "What Them Girls Like" (featuring Flo Rida)
- 2011: "Eat It Up"
- 2011: "No Girlfriend"
- 2011: "Jump Off" (featuring New Boyz)
- 2012: "Ocho Cinco" (Child Please)
- 2013: "Leavin with Me"
- 2015: "Don't You Move"

=== As featured artist ===
- 2010: Flo Rida - "Why You Up in Here" (featuring Git Fresh, Ludacris and Gucci Mane)
- 2010: Trina - "White Girl" (featuring Flo Rida and Git Fresh)
