= Trina =

American rapper

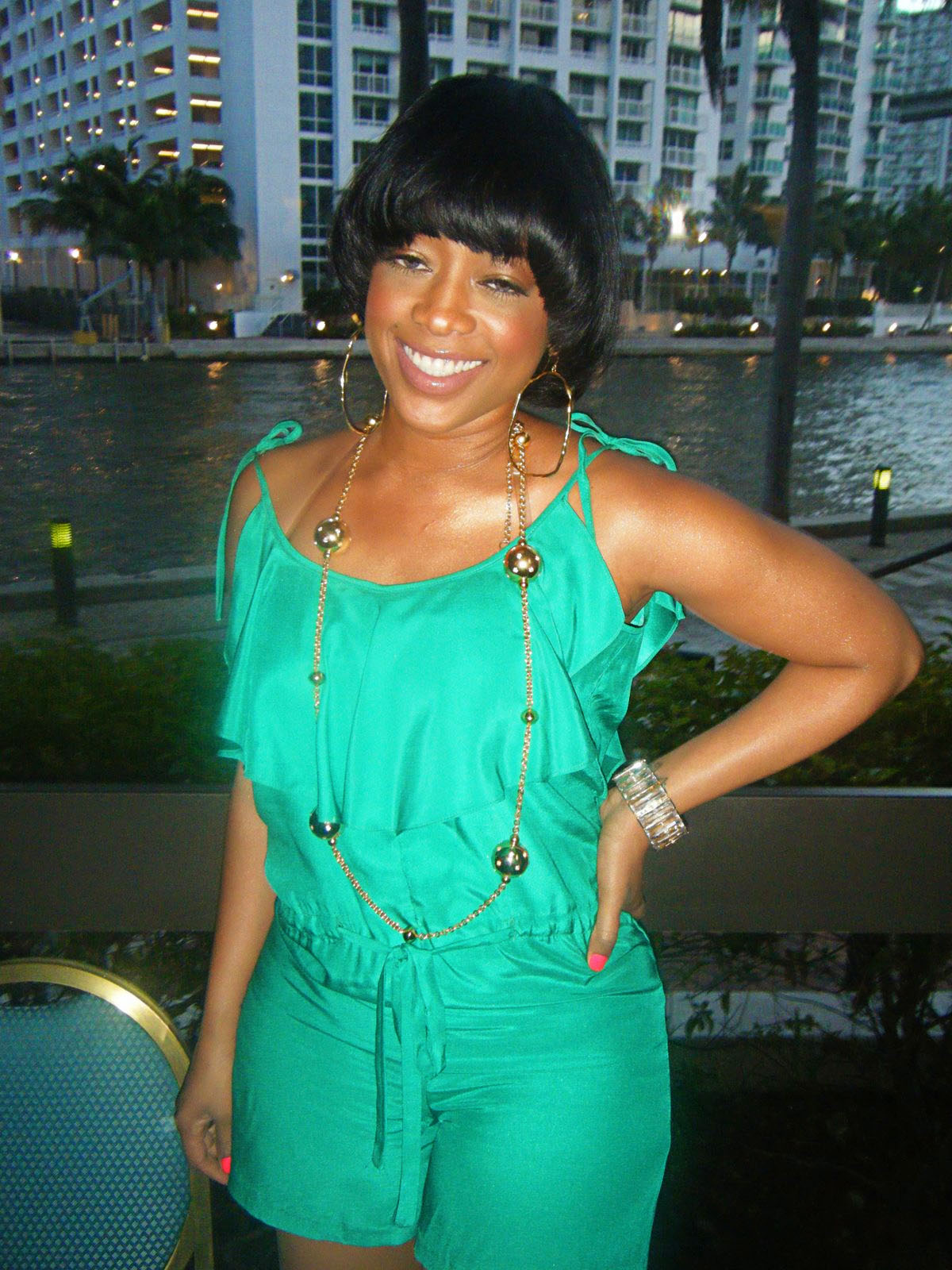
- Trina in 2009

Background information
- Born: Katrina Laverne Taylor; 1974 or 1975 (age 51–52); Miami, Florida, U.S.
- Genre: Hip-hop
- Occupations: Rapper; television personality; songwriter
- Works: Trina discography
- Years active: 1998–present
- Labels: Rockstarr Music; Penalty; EMI; Caroline; New Line; Slip-n-Slide; Atlantic; Def Jam; Jive; Uptown; Tuff City; Elektra; Universal Motown; MNRK
- Spouse: Benjamin Kearse Jr. (m. 2024)

Katrina Laverne Kearse (née Taylor; born c. 1974 or 1975) is an American rapper. She gained recognition for her collaborations on fellow Florida-based rapper Trick Daddy's 1998-2001 singles "Nann Nigga", "Shut Up", and "Take It to da House". She signed with the Miami-based label Slip-N-Slide Records to release her debut album, Da Baddest Bitch (2000), which spawned her first Billboard Hot 100 entry as a lead artist, "Pull Over". Her second album, Diamond Princess (2002), spawned the single "B R Right" (featuring Ludacris) and peaked at number 14 on the Billboard 200.

Trina's third album, Glamorest Life (2005), spawned the single "Here We Go" (featuring Kelly Rowland), which was certified gold by the Recording Industry Association of America (RIAA). Her fourth album, Still da Baddest (2008), peaked within the top ten on the Billboard 200, while her fifth album, Amazin' (2010), peaked within the top 15.

She was described by XXL as "the most consistent female rapper of all time". In 2014, Trina was included in Billboard's list of the "31 Female Rappers Who Changed Hip-Hop".'

== Early life ==
Katrina Laverne Taylor was born in Miami and she grew up in the Liberty City area of the city. Her father is Dominican, while her mother, Vernessa Taylor, was Bahamian. They separated when Trina was a child. She attended Miami Northwestern Senior High School, where she was a majorette, and where she graduated in 1992. Taylor initially educated herself towards becoming a real estate agent, before switching her career path to music.

== Career ==
=== Breakthrough, Da Baddest Bitch (1998–2000) ===
In 1998, Trina was studying to get her real estate license, when she caught the attention of Miami rapper Trick Daddy, who asked her to appear on his track "Nann Nigga". The song was released as the lead single from Trick's second studio album, www.thug.com on July 14, 1998, reaching No. 62 on the US Billboard Hot 100 and No. 3 on the Rap Songs chart. This kickstarted Trina's rap career, leading to a record deal with Slip-n-Slide Records with distribution from Atlantic Records.

On March 21, 2000, Trina released her debut album Da Baddest Bitch, which debuted at No. 33 on the US Billboard 200 and No. 11 on the Top R&B/Hip-Hop Albums chart. It stayed on the Billboard 200 chart for 39 weeks and on the Hip-Hop/R&B album chart for 49 consecutive weeks and was certified Gold by the RIAA by November of that year. The album was preceded by the singles "Da Baddest Bitch" on December 22, 1999, and "Pull Over" on February 13, 2000, which reached No. 93 on the Hot 100, No. 46 on the Hot R&B/Hip-Hop Songs chart, and No. 41 on the Rap Songs chart.

=== Diamond Princess (2001–2003) ===
Trina began working on her second studio album in 2001 with Missy Elliott, enjoying more creative control than ever before, saying in interviews that the album was "more what Trina's about, how Trina looks, how Trina feels, the things that Trina consists of." During this time, she started her own record label imprint, Diva Enterprises. In September 2002, she signed 9-year-old recording artist Lil' Brianna, who would appear on her track "Kandi" and later be known as Brianna Perry.

On August 27, 2002, Trina released her second studio album Diamond Princess, which debuted at No. 14 on the Billboard 200 and No. 5 on the Top R&B/Hip-Hop Albums chart, selling 67,000 units in its first week. The album was preceded by "Told Y'all", featuring Rick Ross, which reached No. 64 on the Hot R&B/Hip-Hop Songs chart and appeared on the soundtrack to the action comedy All About the Benjamins, and "No Panties", featuring Tweet, which reached No. 88 on the Hot R&B/Hip-Hop Songs chart and No. 45 on the UK Singles Chart. On October 22, 2002, Trina released the album's third and final single, "B R Right", featuring Ludacris, which reached No. 83 on the Billboard Hot 100, No. 50 on the Hot R&B/Hip-Hop Songs chart, and No. 24 on the Rap Songs chart.

=== Glamorest Life (2004–2005) ===
On October 4, 2005, Trina released her third studio album, Glamorest Life, which debuted at No. 11 on the Billboard 200, No. 2 on the Top R&B/Hip-Hop Albums chart, and No. 2 on the Top Rap Albums chart, selling 77,000 units in its first week. The album was preceded by the single, "Don't Trip", featuring Lil Wayne on April 28, 2005, which reached No. 74 on the Hot R&B/Hip-Hop Songs chart, and "Here We Go", featuring Kelly Rowland, on September 23, 2005, which became one of Trina's most successful singles, reaching No. 17 on the Hot 100, No. 8 on the Hot R&B/Hip-Hop Songs chart, and No. 3 on the Hot Rap Songs chart and Top 20 in most countries worldwide. The single was certified Gold in the US in June 2006. The album's third and final single, "Da Club", featuring Mannie Fresh, was released on November 22, 2005.

=== Still Da Baddest (2006–2008) ===
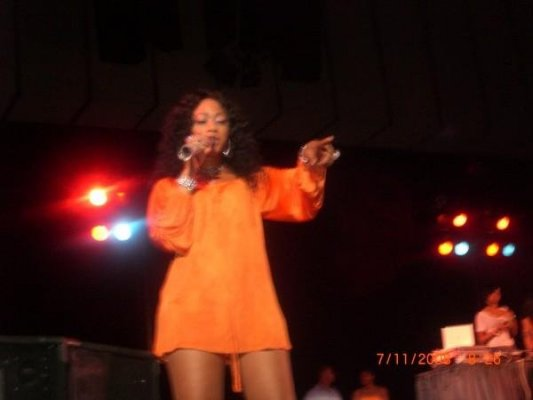
Trina performing in 2008

On May 18, 2007, it was announced that Trina had left Atlantic Records and signed to EMI in conjunction with her original label, Slip-n-Slide Records.

On April 1, 2008, Trina released her fourth studio album, Still da Baddest, which reached No. 6 on the Billboard 200, No. 1 on the Top R&B/Hip-Hop Albums chart, and No. 1 on the Top Rap Albums chart, becoming her first album to top the charts. Its first-week sales were 47,000. The album was preceded by the singles "Single Again", which reached No. 25 on the Bubbling Under Hot 100, No. 59 on the Hot R&B/Hip-Hop Songs chart, and No. 19 on the Rap Songs chart, and "I Got a Thang for You", featuring Keyshia Cole, which reached No. 21 on the Bubbling Under Hot 100 and No. 59 on the Hot R&B/Hip-Hop Songs chart. The third and final single from the album, "Look Back at Me", featuring Killer Mike, hit No. 1 in Denmark.

=== Amazin' (2009–2010) ===
On May 4, 2010, Trina released her fifth studio album, Amazin', which debuted at No. 13 on the Billboard 200, No. 4 on the Top R&B/Hip-Hop Albums chart, No. 2 on the Top Rap Albums chart, and No. 1 on the Billboard Independent Albums chart. The album sold over 32,000 copies in its first week. The album was preceded by the singles "That's My Attitude" on August 21, 2009, "Million Dollar Girl", featuring Diddy and Keri Hilson, on January 12, 2010, which reached No. 61 on the Hot R&B/Hip-Hop Songs chart and No. 20 on the Rap Songs chart, "Always", featuring Monica, on April 20, 2010, which reached No. 42 on the Hot R&B/Hip-Hop Songs chart, and "White Girl", featuring Flo Rida and Git Fresh, on June 29, 2010.

=== Independent releases (2011–2016) ===
On March 28, 2011, Trina released the mixtape Diamonds Are Forever. It was preceded by the singles "Ghetto", featuring T-Pain, "Waist So Skinny", featuring Rick Ross, and "Can I", featuring Mýa. The mixtape received 4.8 million streams in two days. During this time, Trina was preparing her sixth studio album. On November 9, 2011, Trina announced on MTV RapFix Live that she was no longer signed to Slip-N-Slide Records, the label she had been with since the beginning of her career.

"Slip-n-Slide is like my family. I grew up with those guys, and it's been a long journey. I love them dearly, but it's time, in my career, for me to move forward."

— Trina on Slip-N-Slide departure MTV RAPFIX Live interview

On December 3, 2012, Trina released the mixtape Back 2 Business, which was preceded by the singles "Beam" featuring Gunplay and Iceberg Slimm, and "Bad Bitch", featuring Lola Monroe and Shawnna.

On December 17, 2012, Trina appeared as a co-host on the VH1 late night talk show Tiny Tonight! with Tiny, Tamar Braxton and Claudia Jordan.

On March 9, 2015, Trina revealed that she had signed a new imprint venture with Penalty Entertainment. Days earlier, Trina had released the promotional single "Real One" featuring Rico Love, who she said would be the executive producer of her sixth album. On July 21, 2015, Trina previewed its music video on an episode of Love and Hip Hop Atlanta: Afterparty Live! on July 21, 2015. On October 29, Wolfgang Gartner announced that his song "Turn Up", featuring Trina and Wiley, would be featured on the soundtrack for the video game Need For Speed. On November 13, Trina released her single "Fuck Boy", along with a remix of One Direction's "Perfect", both garnered positive reviews.

On March 21, 2016, the 16th anniversary of her debut album Da Baddest Bitch, Trina released the single "Overnight", which discusses the ups and downs of her career including lawsuits, label issues, and being underestimated. On April 1, 2016, Trina released the single "Forget That", featuring Steph Lecor, from the Meet the Blacks soundtrack. On July 11, Trina participated in Missy Elliott's tribute for VH1's Hip Hop Honors: All Hail The Queens. On December 3, Trina celebrated her 38th birthday by unveiling a surprise EP, Dynasty 6, at a private Art Basel event.

=== The One (2017–2020) ===
On August 25, 2017, it was announced that Trina and Trick Daddy would star in the VH1 reality television series Love & Hip Hop: Miami.

On June 21, 2019, Trina released her much-delayed sixth studio album, The One. In a 2020 interview, Trina stated that she was working on another project that was "almost done".

=== Verzuz with Eve and final album (2021–present) ===
On June 16, 2021, Trina participated in a competition match via Verzuz against her longtime friend and collaborator, Philadelphia rapper Eve. The following year, the former was awarded the 2022 "I Am Hip-Hop" icon award during the BET Hip Hop Awards.

== Professional wrestling ==
On September 21, 2022, Trina made a guest appearance on All Elite Wrestling's Dynamite program, being revealed as the celebrity guest supporting Diamante against TBS Champion Jade Cargill. Two nights later on AEW Rampage, Trina appeared in Diamante's corner during the TBS Championship match, which saw Diamante defeated by Cargill. After the match ended, Trina turned heel on Diamante; attacking her and showing her support for Cargill.

== Personal life ==
=== Relationships ===
Trina was in an on-again, off-again relationship with rapper Lil Wayne from 2005 to 2007. On October 5, 2005, during an interview with Wendy Williams, she confirmed that she and Wayne were engaged to be married. Trina later became pregnant by Lil Wayne, but suffered a miscarriage. The couple have matching tattoos, Trina has "Wayne" on her wrist, while Lil Wayne has "Trina" spelled out on his ring finger.

During her time with Lil Wayne, Trina was involved in a private affair with former G-Unit rapper Young Buck that lasted between mid-2005 and throughout 2006. She later dated basketball player Kenyon Martin from 2007 to 2010. He had the image of her lips tattooed on his neck. Trina dated rapper French Montana from 2012 to 2014.

Trina began dating Raymond Taylor in 2017 and got engaged in September 2021. Their engagement was called off sometime prior to 2024.

Trina privately married rapper and entrepreneur, Benjamin Kearse Jr., known as Beau Swurv, on May 22, 2024. The two later appeared on the sixth season of Love & Hip Hop: Miami.

=== Family deaths ===
Trina's brother, Wilbrent Bain Jr., was murdered in a shooting in 2013. Her mother, Vernessa Taylor, died at age 62 after a struggle with cancer in September 2019. In July 2022, Trina's niece, Toni "Baby Suga" Chester, was killed at the age of 17.

== Philanthropy ==
Trina started the Diamond Doll Foundation, a non-profit organization that helps younger girls with their life struggles. The organization is partnered with the Florida Entertainment Summit to organize the Jingle Bell Toy Drive for children in South Florida.. She partners with the City of Miami and Miami Dade County annually to host the free community event ‘Trina Day’ in her hometown of Liberty City, Miami, Florida to give gifts, scholarships, and school supplies to kids and local families in need.

== Awards and nominations ==
=== BET Awards ===
Year	Award	Category	Nominated work	Result	Ref.
2001	BET Award	Best Female Hip Hop Artist	Herself	Nominated	
2002	BET Award	Best Female Hip Hop Artist	Herself	Nominated	
2002	BET Award	Video of the Year	"One Minute Man" (with Missy Elliott and Ludacris)	Nominated	
2003	BET Award	Best Female Hip Hop Artist	Herself	Nominated	
2006	BET Award	Best Female Hip Hop Artist	Herself	Nominated	
2008	BET Award	Best Female Hip Hop Artist	Herself	Nominated	
2009	BET Award	Best Female Hip Hop Artist	Herself	Nominated	
2010	BET Award	Best Female Hip Hop Artist	Herself	Nominated	
2011	BET Award	Best Female Hip Hop Artist	Herself	Nominated	
2015	BET Award	Best Female Hip Hop Artist	Herself	Nominated	
2022	BET Hip Hop Award	I Am Hip Hop Award	Herself	Honored	

=== MTV VMA Awards ===
Year	Category	Nominated work	Result	Ref.
2002	Best Art Direction in a Video	"One Minute Man" (with Missy Elliott and Ludacris)	Nominated	
2002	Best Cinematography in a Video	"One Minute Man" (with Missy Elliott and Ludacris)	Nominated	
2002	Best Direction in a Video	"One Minute Man" (with Missy Elliott and Ludacris)	Nominated	
2002	Best Editing in a Video	"One Minute Man" (with Missy Elliott and Ludacris)	Nominated	
2002	Best Hip-Hop Video	"One Minute Man" (with Missy Elliott and Ludacris)	Nominated	
2002	Best Special Effects in a Video	"One Minute Man" (with Missy Elliott and Ludacris)	Nominated	

=== Soul Train Lady of Soul Awards ===
Year	Category	Nominated work	Result
2001	Best R&B/Soul or Rap Music Video	"Pull Over"	Nominated
2002	Best R&B/Soul or Rap Music Video	"Told Y'all"	Nominated
2002	Best R&B/Soul or Rap Music Video	"One Minute Man" (with Missy Elliott and Ludacris)	Won

=== Miscellaneous awards and nominations ===
Year	Award	Category	Nominated work	Result	Ref.
2003	Source Hip Hop Award	Single of the Year - Female Solo Artist	"B R Right" (with Ludacris)	Nominated	
2003	Source Hip Hop Award	Artist of the Year - Female Solo	Herself	Nominated	
2004	Source Hip Hop Award	Best Female Rap Collaboration	"Right Thurr" (with Chingy)	Nominated	
2004	Source Hip Hop Award	Remix of the Year	"Right Thurr" (with Chingy)	Won	
2005	American Music Award	Favorite Rap/Hip Hop Artist	Herself	Nominated	
2011	EME Award	International Friend of Reggae Honoree	Herself	Honored	
2014	All Star Music Experience	Lifetime Achievement Award	Herself	Honored	

== Discography ==
Studio albums

- Da Baddest Bitch (2000)
- Diamond Princess (2002)
- Glamorest Life (2005)
- Still da Baddest (2008)
- Amazin' (2010)
- The One (2019)

== Filmography ==
=== Film ===
Year	Title	Role
2003	A Miami Tail	Alica Strada
2004	Sweet Potato Pie	Regina
2011	The Cookout 2	Woman Placing Bet
2021	Dear Best Friend	Pamela
2025	Love After Holidays	Minerva
2026	The Night Shift	Victoria Valdez

=== Television ===
Year	Title	Role	Notes
2001	The 15th Annual Soul Train Music Awards	Herself	
2001	2001 MTV Video Music Awards	Herself	Presenter
2001	Lady of Soul Awards	Herself	Presenter
2002	2nd Annual BET Awards	Herself	
2003	Trina: The Making of a Diamond Princess	Herself	
2005	2005 Radio Music Awards	Herself	
2005	With Friends Like These	Cleo	
2006	DJ Khaled Makes A Video: Holla at Me		
2006	BET Awards 2006	Herself	
2007	The Parker Report	Herself	
2008	BET Awards 2008	Herself	
2010	The Mo'Nique Show	Herself	1 episode
2010	Style-City Music Presents	Herself	
2010	2010 VH1 Hip Hop Honors: The Dirty South	Herself	Performer
2010	My Mic Sounds Nice: The Truth About Women In Hip Hop	Herself	Documentary
2011	La La's Full Court Life	Herself	1 episode
2011–2014	RapFix Live	Herself	2 episodes
2012	2012 Bet Hip Hop Awards	Herself	
2013	Tiny Tonight	Herself	Co-Host
2014	Rupaul's Drag Race	Herself	
2015	Love & Hip Hop Atlanta: After Party Live!	Herself	1 episode
2016	K.Michelle: My Life	Herself	2 episodes
2017	Wild 'n Out	Herself	1 episode, Team Captain, Performer
2017	Being	Herself	
2017	Hip Hop Squares	Herself	1 episode, Contestant
2017	The Mane Event	Herself – Bridesmaid	
2018	Love & Hip Hop: New York	Herself	1 episode
2018–2025	Love & Hip Hop: Miami	Herself	Main cast
2021	VH1 Family Reunion: Love & Hip Hop Edition	Herself	Main cast
2021	Queens	Herself	Episode: “2022”
2022	AEW Grand Slam	Herself	Appeared in a backstage segment on Dynamite and accompanied Diamante on Rampage
2022	Baddies	Herself/Host	3 episodes
2022	The Real Housewives of Potomac	Herself	Guest, 2 episodes

=== Video games ===
Year	Title	Role
2026	Grand Theft Auto VI	Radio host of Dirty South Classics

== See also ==
- List of Afro-Latinos
