= Trick Daddy discography =

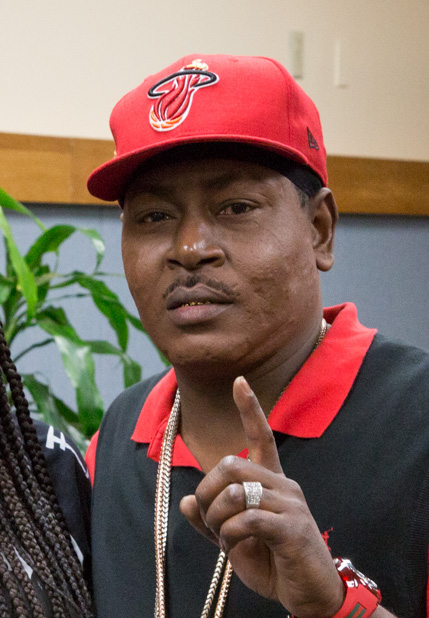
- Trick Daddy in 2015
- Studio albums: 8
- Singles: 13

This is the discography of Trick Daddy, an American rapper from Miami, Florida.

== Albums ==
=== Studio albums ===
List of studio albums, with selected chart positions and certifications
Title	Album details	Peak chart positions			Certifications
Title	Album details	US	US R&B	US Rap	Certifications
Based on a True Story	Released: July 29, 1997; Label: Slip-n-Slide, Warlock; Format: CD, LP, cassette, digital download	—	59	—	
www.thug.com	Released: September 22, 1998; Label: Slip-n-Slide, Warlock; Format: CD, LP, cassette, digital download	30	7	—	RIAA: Gold
Book of Thugs: Chapter AK Verse 47	Released: February 15, 2000; Label: Slip-n-Slide, Atlantic; Format: CD, LP, cassette, digital download	26	8	—	RIAA: Gold
Thugs Are Us	Released: March 20, 2001; Label: Slip-n-Slide, Atlantic; Format: CD, LP, cassette, digital download	4	2	—	RIAA: Platinum
Thug Holiday	Released: August 6, 2002; Label: Slip-n-Slide, Atlantic; Format: CD, LP, cassette, digital download	6	2	—	RIAA: Gold
Thug Matrimony: Married to the Streets	Released: October 26, 2004; Label: Slip-n-Slide, Atlantic; Format: CD, LP, cassette, digital download	2	1	1	RIAA: Platinum
Back by Thug Demand	Released: December 19, 2006; Label: Slip-n-Slide, Atlantic; Format: CD, LP, digital download	48	10	5	
Finally Famous: Born a Thug, Still a Thug	Released: September 15, 2009; Label: Dunk Ryder, Fontana; Format: CD, digital download	34	9	6	
"—" denotes a recording that did not chart.

== Singles ==
=== As lead artist ===
List of singles, with selected chart positions and certifications, showing year released and album name
Title	Year	Peak chart positions						Certifications	Album
Title	Year	US	US R&B	US Rap	AUS	IRE	UK	Certifications	Album
"Nann Nigga" (featuring Trina)	1998	62	20	3	—	—	—		www.thug.com
"Shut Up" (featuring Duece Poppito, Trina and Co)	1999	83	25	20	—	—	—		Book of Thugs: Chapter AK Verse 47
"Take It to da House" (featuring Trina and The SNS Express)	2001	50	23	20	—	—	—		Thugs Are Us
"I'm a Thug"	2001	17	8	16	—	—	—		Thugs Are Us
"In da Wind" (featuring Cee Lo Green and Big Boi)	2002	70	28	16	—	—	—		Thug Holiday
"Thug Holiday" (featuring LaTocha Scott)	2002	87	40	24	—	—	—		Thug Holiday
"Let's Go" (featuring Lil Jon and Twista)	2004	7	10	4	35	27	26	RIAA: Gold	Thug Matrimony: Married to the Streets
"Sugar (Gimme Some)" (featuring Cee Lo Green, Ludacris and Lil' Kim)	2005	20	36	12	31	—	61	RIAA: Gold	Thug Matrimony: Married to the Streets
"Bet That" (featuring Chamillionaire and Gold Rush)	2006	104	66	—	—	—	—		Back by Thug Demand
"Tuck Ya Ice" (featuring Birdman)	2007	—	90	—	—	—	—		Back by Thug Demand
"Why They Jock" (featuring Ice "Billion" Berg and Murk Camp)	2009	—	89	—	—	—	—		Finally Famous: Born a Thug, Still a Thug
"U Already Know"	2014	—	—	—	—	—	—		U Already Know
"Paradise" (with Trina featuring Mike Smiff)	2018	—	—	—	—	—	—		TBA
"—" denotes a recording that did not chart or was not released in that territory.

=== As featured artist ===
List of singles, with selected chart positions and certifications, showing year released and album name
Title	Year	Peak chart positions			Certifications	Album
Title	Year	US	US R&B	US Rap	Certifications	Album
"Still Ballin'" (2Pac featuring Trick Daddy)	2003	69	31	15		Better Dayz
"Round Here" (Memphis Bleek featuring Trick Daddy and T.I.)	2003	—	53	—		M.A.D.E.
"What's Happenin!" (Ying Yang Twins featuring Trick Daddy)	2004	30	24	9		Me & My Brother
"Born-N-Raised" (DJ Khaled featuring Trick Daddy, Pitbull and Rick Ross)	2006	—	83	—		Listennn... the Album
"I'm So Hood" (DJ Khaled featuring T-Pain, Trick Daddy, Rick Ross and Plies)	2007	19	9	5	RIAA: Gold	We the Best
"Out Here Grindin" (DJ Khaled featuring Akon, Rick Ross, Young Jeezy, Lil Boosie, Trick Daddy, Ace Hood and Plies)	2008	38	32	17	RIAA: Gold	We Global
"—" denotes a recording that did not chart.

== Guest appearances ==
List of non-single guest appearances, with other performing artists, showing year released and album name
Title	Year	Other artist(s)	Album
"Scarred"	1996	Uncle Luke, Verb	Uncle Luke
"Dank"	1999	JT Money	Pimpin' on Wax
"It's Like That"	1999	Cha Cha, Juvenile, Jim Crow	Dear Diary
"Shut Yo Face (Uncle Fucka)"	1999	Trina, Tre+6	South Park: Bigger, Longer & Uncut
"O.K."	2000	Torrey Carter, Petey Pablo, Missy Elliott	The Life I Live
"Off the Chain Wit It"	2000	Trina	Da Baddest Bitch
"I Don't Need You"	2000	Trina	Da Baddest Bitch
"Stomp"	2000	Yung Wun	Ryde or Die Vol. 2
"I Luv"	2001	Too Short, Scarface, Daz Dillinger	Chase the Cat
"Watch the Police"	2001	C-Murder	Training Day (soundtrack)
"My Projects (Remix)"	2001	Coo Coo Cal, Kurupt	Disturbed
"My Niggaz Dem"	2001	DJ Clue, Trina	The Professional 2
"Play No Games"	2002	Lil Jon, Fat Joe, Oobie	Kings of Crunk
"Da Man"	2002	Big Tymers, TQ	Hood Rich
"Haters"	2002	Field Mob	From tha Roota to tha Toota
"Round Here"	2003	Memphis Bleek, T.I.	M.A.D.E.
"What's Happenin!"	2003	Ying Yang Twins	Me & My Brother
"Rubber Band Man (Remix)"	2003	T.I., Mack 10, Twista	Trap Muzik
"Melting Pot"	2004	Pitbull	M.I.A.M.I.
"Stand Up"	2004	T.I., Lil Wayne, Lil Jon	Urban Legend
"Champion"	2004	Jacki-O	Poe Little Rich Girl
"Hopeless"	2004	Ludacris	The Red Light District
"Life Goes On"	2004	Ja Rule, Chink Santana	R.U.L.E.
"Pussy M.F.'s"	2005	Boyz n da Hood	Boyz n da Hood
"Last of a Dying Breed"	2005	Young Jeezy, Young Buck, Lil Will	Let's Get It: Thug Motivation 101
"Stay Fly (Remix)"	2005	Three 6 Mafia, Slim Thug, Project Pat	Most Known Unknown
"I'm Sprung 2"	2005	T-Pain, YoungBloodZ	Rappa Ternt Sanga
"AKs N Chevrolets"	2005	Jody Breeze, Sean P, Jazze Pha	A Day in the Life of Jody Breeze
"Born N Raised"	2006	DJ Khaled, Pitbull, Rick Ross	Listennn... the Album
"Move Something"	2006	Uncle Luke, Jacki-O	My Life & Freaky Times
"Frikitona (Chosen Few Remix)"	2006	Plan B, Trina, LDA	Chosen Few II: El Documental
"I'm So Hood"	2007	DJ Khaled, Rick Ross, Plies, T-Pain	We the Best
"I'm From the Ghetto"	2007	DJ Khaled, Dre, The Game, Jadakiss	We the Best
"Bitch I'm From Dade County"	2007	DJ Khaled, Trina, Rick Ross, Brisco, Flo Rida, C-Ride, Dre	We the Best
"Dukey Love"	2007	Pitbull, Fabo	The Boatlift
"I Ain't Fucking Wit U!"	2007	Young Buck, Snoop Dogg	Buck the World
"Never Tell"	2007	Plies	The Truth Hurts
"Tuck Ya Ice"	2007	Plies	The Truth Hurts
"Chevy Smile"	2007	Yung Joc, Block, Jazze Pha	Hustlenomics
"Gutta"	2008	Ace Hood	Gutta
"Luxury Tax"	2008	Rick Ross, Lil Wayne, Young Jeezy	Trilla
"Out Her Grindin"	2008	DJ Khaled, Rick Ross, Plies, Lil Boosie, Ace Hood, Lil Wayne, Akon	We Global
"Fuck the Other Side"	2008	DJ Khaled, Dunk Ryders	We Global
"I'm Fresh"	2009	DJ Drama, Mike Jones, Rick Ross	Gangsta Grillz: The Album (Vol. 2)
"Burn Hollywood"	2009	Mike Epps, Birdman, Yung Joc, Bow Wow, Brisco, T.I., Akon, Willie the Kid	Funny Bidness: Da Album
"Ride Wit Me"	2010	Young Jeezy, Scarface	Trap or Die 2
"Betta Get It"	2010	EDIDON, Young Noble, Stormey Coleman, Kastro	The Stash Spot
"This One's For You"	2011	Young Jeezy	Thug Motivation 103: Hustlerz Ambition
"Pour Out Yo Liquor"	2011	Ice Berg, Shonie	Mr. L.I.V.E. 2
"Aww Man"	2012	Gold Ru$h, Blood Raw	—N/a
"On My Job"	2012	Young AJ	Just Like Music
"Nice"	2015	Premadonna, Rich Homie Quan	—N/a

== Music videos ==
Year	Video	Director
1998	"Nann Nigga" (w/ Trina)	Zodiac Fishgrease
2000	"Shut Up (Remix)" (w/ Trina, Duece Poppi)	Zodiac Fishgrease
2000	"Amerika" (w/ Society)	Brian Frank & Gil Green
2000	"Boy" (w/ Fat, J.V., Kase & Mystic)	Nick Quested
2001	"Take It to da House" (w/ Trina & The SNS Express)	Nick Quested
2001	"I'm A Thug"	Nick Quested
2002	"In da Wind" (w/Big Boi & Cee-Lo)	Bryan Barber
2004	"Let's Go" (w/ Lil Jon & Twista)	Erik White
2004	"Sugar (Gimme Some)"/ "J.O.D.D." (w/ Cee-Lo & Lil' Kim)	Ray Kay
2006	"Bet That" (w/ Chamillionaire & Gold Rush)	Shane Drake & Himself
2006	"Tuck Ya Ice" (w/ Birdman)	R. Malcolm Jones
