= James Lopez =

American film producer and executive

- Born: 1968 (age 57–58)
- Education: Sam Houston State University (BS)
- Occupations: Film producer and executive
- Years active: 2000–present
- Known for: Filmography

James Lopez (born 1968) is an American producer, film executive, and former music executive. He is the president of Macro Film Studios since 2021, and has received nominations for two Black Reel Awards and one Film Independent Spirit Award. He is a member of the executive branch of the Academy of Motion Picture Arts and Sciences.

== Career ==
Lopez began in entertainment as a music executive before transitioning into film. In 2000, Lopez started as senior vice president of marketing at Atlantic Records. At Atlantic, he oversaw marketing campaigns for various multi-platinum artists, including T.I. and Sean Paul. He also oversaw soundtracks for films including Hustle & Flow (2005) and Avatar (2009). His work in soundtracks and music videos would influence a move into the film industry.

After Atlantic, Lopez moved to become a senior vice president of production at Screen Gems, a label of Sony Pictures Entertainment. In 2015, he left Screen Gems to become a producer and head of motion pictures at Will Packer Productions. In 2021, Lopez became the president of Macro Film Studios, and oversees development, production, and distribution of their slate.

Lopez has worked as a producer for a variety of films, including What Men Want (2019), Little (2019), The Photograph (2020), Beast (2022), and One of Them Days (2025). He has also worked as an executive producer on films including Girls Trip (2017), Night School (2018), They Cloned Tyrone (2023), and Freaky Tales (2024).

Lopez serves on the Board of Directors for the Producer's Guild of America Foundation, a philanthropic wing of the PGA that promotes inclusivity, access, and sustainability in the film industry.

== Personal life ==
Lopez is an alumnus of Sam Houston State University.

== Filmography ==
=== Film ===
Year	Title	Credit	Notes
2012	Think Like a Man	Executive in charge of production	
2013	Battle of The Year	Executive in charge of production	
2014	Think Like a Man Too	Executive in charge of production	
2014	About Last Night	Executive in charge of production	
2014	#AmeriCan	Producer	Short
2015	The Wedding Ringer	Executive in charge of production	
2015	The Perfect Guy	Executive in charge of production	
2016	When The Bough Breaks	Executive in charge of production	
2016	Almost Christmas	Executive Producer	
2017	Girls Trip	Executive Producer	
2018	Breaking In	Producer	
2018	Night School	Executive Producer	
2019	What Men Want	Producer (p.g.a)^{[a]}	
2019	Little	Producer (p.g.a)^{[a]}	
2019	Jacob's Ladder	Executive Producer	
2020	The Photograph	Producer (p.g.a)^{[a]}	
2022	Beast	Producer (p.g.a)^{[a]}	
2023	Young. Wild. Free.	Producer	
2023	Praise This	Producer	Television Film
2023	They Cloned Tyrone	Executive Producer	
2023	Oracle	Producer	
2024	Freaky Tales	Executive Producer	
2025	One of Them Days	Producer (p.g.a)^{[a]}	
2025	Wizkid: Long Live Lagos	Executive Producer	Documentary
2025	Eternal Return	Producer	Upcoming Release
2026	Rock Springs	Producer	Festivals

=== Upcoming ===
Year	Title	Credit	Notes
TBD	Samo Lives	Producer	Post-production
TBD	Don't Ever Wonder	Producer	Production
TBD	One of Them Days 2	Producer	Development

== Selected Discography ==
=== Albums ===
As Music Executive

Year	Album	Artist	Certification
2000	Da Baddest Bitch	Trina	Gold
2001	Jealous Ones Still Envy (J.O.S.E.)	Fat Joe	Platinum
2001	Born to Do It	Craig David	Platinum
2001	Thugs Are Us	Trick Daddy	Platinum
2002	Watermelon, Chicken & Gritz	Nappy Roots	Platinum
2002	Loyalty	Fat Joe	Gold
2002	Diamond Princess	Trina	
2002	Dutty Rock	Sean Paul	3× Platinum
2002	Thug Holiday	Trick Daddy	Gold
2003	Trap Muzik	T.I.	Platinum
2003	Wooden Leather	Nappy Roots	
2004	Kamikaze	Twista	2× Platinum
2004	Urban Legend	T.I.	2× Platinum
2004	Thug Matrimony: Married to the Streets	Trick Daddy	Platinum
2004	Real Talk	Fabolous	Gold
2005	The Minstrel Show	Little Brother	
2005	I Gotta Make It	Trey Songz	
2006	King	T.I.	2× Platinum
2007	T.I. vs. T.I.P.	T.I.	Platinum
2008	Paper Trail	T.I.	4× Platinum

=== Film Soundtracks and Albums ===
As Music Executive

Year	Movie	Artist
2005	Hustle & Flow	Various
2007	Daddy's Little Girls	Various
2007	P.S. I Love You	Various
2008	Nick & Norah's Infinite Playlist	Various
2009	Avatar	Jack Horner

== Awards and nominations ==
Year	Award	Category	Production	Result
2023	Black Reel Awards	Outstanding TV Movie or Limited Series	Praise This	Nominated
2026	Black Reel Awards	Outstanding Film	One of Them Days	Nominated
2026	Independent Spirit Awards	Best First Feature	One of Them Days	Nominated

== Notes ==
a.^{^} ^{^} ^{^} ^{^} ^{^} The PGA mark, introduced in 2012, certifies that a listed producer has performed a major portion of the producing duties on a motion picture, marking eligibility for some awards nominations in the role of producer.
