= Dray =

Dray may refer to:

- Dray (horse-drawn), any of various wagon styles
- Dray horse, a horse that pulls a dray
- Dray (name)
- Dray Prescot series, science fiction novels by Kenneth Bulmer under the pseudonym Alan Burt Akers
- Dray, an uncommon spelling of drey, the nest of a tree squirrel or flying squirrel

== See also ==
- Drayage
