= Www.thug.com =

www.thug.com

Studio album by Trick Daddy
- Released: September 22, 1998
- Recorded: 1997–98
- Genre: Southern hip hop; gangsta rap; dirty rap
- Length: 44:43
- Label: Slip-N-Slide; Warlock
- Producer: Ted "Touche" Lucas (exec.); Abebe & Hugo; Darren "DJ Spin" Rudnick; Righteous Funk Boogie; Rush; The Committee; Tony Galvin

Trick Daddy chronology
Based on a True Story (1997)	www.thug.com (1998)	Book of Thugs: Chapter AK Verse 47 (2000)

Singles from www.thug.com
- 1. "Nann Nigga" Released: July 14, 1998

Professional ratings
Review scores
Source	Rating
AllMusic	2/5 stars

www.thug.com is the second studio album by American rapper Trick Daddy, known at the time under the name as Trick Daddy Dollars and released after his debut album Based on a True Story. The album was released on September 22, 1998, through Slip-N-Slide/Warlock Records. The album managed to peak at number 30 on the Billboard 200, the fifth-highest peak of any Trick Daddy album. In 1999, the album was certified Gold by the Recording Industry Association of America. The title www.thug.com was also the URL of Trick Daddy's official website. As of March 2025, the URL redirects to the Slip-N-Slide website.

== Track listing ==
No.	Title	Producer(s)	Length
1.	"Log On"		0:06
2.	"For the Thugs"	Tony Galvin	4:11
3.	"Back in the Days"	Darren "DJ Spin" Rudnick	4:39
4.	"So What" (featuring the Lost Tribe)	Abebe & Hugo	3:49
5.	"Tater Head" (removed from clean version)	Righteous Funk Boogie	0:19
6.	"Nann Nigga" (featuring Trina)	Righteous Funk Boogie	2:47
7.	"Hold On" (featuring J-Shin)	Darren "DJ Spin" Rudnick	4:45
8.	"Call From Dante" (removed from clean version)	Righteous Funk Boogie	0:19
9.	"Change My Life" (featuring Tre+6)	Righteous Funk Boogie	4:05
10.	"I'll Be Your Other Man" (featuring J.A.B.A.N.)	Abebe & Hugo	3:37
11.	"Suckin' Fuckin'" (featuring C.O.) (removed from clean version)	Righteous Funk Boogie	4:38
12.	"Stroke It Gently" (removed from clean version)	Righteous Funk Boogie	0:31
13.	"Run Nigga" (featuring Tre+6)	Righteous Funk Boogie	3:48
14.	"Living in a World" (featuring Society and the Children's Choir)	Rush	3:48
15.	"I'll Be Your Player" (Remix)	The Committee	3:06
16.	"Log Off"		0:15
Total length:			44:43

Bonus tracks
No.	Title	Length
17.	"I Luv"
18.	"My Niggaz Dem"

== Charts ==
=== Weekly charts ===
Chart (1998–99)	Peak position
US Billboard 200	30
US Top R&B/Hip-Hop Albums (Billboard)	7

=== Year-end charts ===
Chart (1999)	Position
US Billboard 200	125
US Top R&B/Hip-Hop Albums (Billboard)	28

== Certifications ==
Region	Certification	Certified units/sales
United States (RIAA)	Gold	500,000^{^}
^{^} Shipments figures based on certification alone.
