= Sugar (Gimme Some) =

Single by Trick Daddy featuring Ludacris, Lil' Kim & CeeLo Green

from the album Thug Matrimony: Married to the Streets
- Released: January 10, 2005
- Genre: Hip hop; dirty rap
- Length: 4:05
- Label: Atlantic; Slip-n-Slide
- Songwriters: R. Daisley; C. Bridges; D. Byrne
- Producer: Mike Caren

Trick Daddy singles chronology
"Let's Go" (2004)	"Sugar (Gimme Some)" (2005)	"Bet That" (2006)

Ludacris singles chronology
"Lovers and Friends" (2004)	"Sugar (Gimme Some)" (2005)	"Number One Spot" (2005)

Lil' Kim singles chronology
"Thug Luv" (2003)	"Sugar (Gimme Some)" (2005)	"Lighters Up" (2005)

"Sugar (Gimme Some)" is a song by American rapper Trick Daddy featuring fellow American rapper Ludacris & American singer CeeLo Green, released as the second single from the former's sixth studio album Thug Matrimony: Married to the Streets (2004). Produced by Mike Caren, the single was certified Gold by the RIAA.

== Remix ==
The official remix replaces Trick Daddy's second verse with a verse by Lil' Kim. There is a second version that has Trick Daddy's 2nd verse after Lil' Kim's.

== Music video ==
The video for "Sugar" is the remix version with Lil' Kim & Cee-Lo Green, but Ludacris was absent on the video so his verse from the song was omitted from the video. In 2004, the video was shot in Miami, and was directed by Haugesunder.

== Original version ==
The song is built around an interpolation of the 1977 Talking Heads song "Sugar on My Tongue".

== Track listings ==
- US digital download
1. "Sugar (Gimme Some)" (featuring Ludacris, Lil' Kim and Cee-Lo) – 4:06
- Australian CD single
1. "Sugar (Gimme Some)" (album version) – 4:05
2. "Sugar (Gimme Some)" (amended album version) – 4:05
3. "Sugar (Gimme Some)" (remix) (featuring Lil' Kim and Cee-Lo) – 3:34
4. "Sugar (Gimme Some)" (remix) (featuring Ludacris, Lil' Kim and Cee-Lo) – 4:06
- European CD single
1. "Sugar (Gimme Some)" (album version) – 4:05
2. "Sugar (Gimme Some)" (remix) (featuring Ludacris, Lil' Kim and Cee-Lo) – 4:07

== Charts ==
=== Weekly charts ===
Chart (2004–2005)	Peak position
Australia (ARIA)	31
Australian Urban (ARIA)	16
Canada CHR/Pop Top 30 (Radio & Records)	19
UK Singles (OCC)	61
UK Hip Hop/R&B (OCC)	16
US Billboard Hot 100	20
US Pop Airplay (Billboard)	4
US Hot R&B/Hip-Hop Songs (Billboard)	36
US Hot Rap Songs (Billboard)	12
US Rhythmic Airplay (Billboard)	14

=== Year-end charts ===
Chart (2005)	Position
US Billboard Hot 100	55
US Mainstream Top 40 (Billboard)	27
US Rhythmic (Billboard)	42

== Certifications ==
Region	Certification	Certified units/sales
United States (RIAA)	Gold	500,000^{*}
United States (RIAA) Mastertone	Gold	500,000^{*}
^{*} Sales figures based on certification alone.

== Release history ==
Region	Date	Format(s)	Label(s)	Ref.
United States	January 10, 2005	Urban radio	Slip-n-Slide; Atlantic	
United States	January 24, 2005	Contemporary hit radio	Slip-n-Slide; Atlantic	
Australia	May 23, 2005	CD single	Slip-n-Slide; Atlantic	
