= Thug Holiday (song) =

2002 single by Trick Daddy

Single by Trick Daddy featuring LaTocha Scott

from the album Thug Holiday
- Released: 2002
- Genre: Hip hop
- Length: 4:54
- Label: Slip-N-Slide; Atlantic
- Songwriter(s): Maurice Young; LaTocha Scott; Lavell Crump
- Producer(s): David Banner

Trick Daddy singles chronology
"In da Wind" (2002)	"Thug Holiday" (2002)	"Still Ballin'" (2003)

LaTocha Scott singles chronology
"Thug Holiday" (2002)

Music video
- "Thug Holiday" on YouTube

"Thug Holiday" is a song by American rapper Trick Daddy and the second single from his fifth studio album of the same name (2002). It features American singer LaTocha Scott of the R&B group Xscape. The song was produced by David Banner.

== Composition ==
A piano-driven track, "Thug Holiday" sees Trick Daddy rapping about the issues of life in the ghetto, and putting his guns away and praying for people who are affected by the consequences of the "thug life". Trick also addresses everyday conflicts that people face, such as inequality and violence.

== Charts ==
Chart (2002–03)	Peak position
US Billboard Hot 100	87
US Hot R&B/Hip-Hop Songs (Billboard)	40
US Hot Rap Songs (Billboard)	24
