= Poe Little Rich Girl =

Studio album by Jacki-O
- Released: October 26, 2004
- Recorded: 2003–2004
- Genre: Hip hop
- Label: Poe Boy; TVT
- Producer: Nottz, Cool & Dre, Timbaland, Jazze Pha, Gorilla Tek, Red Spyda, Mr. Collipark

Professional ratings
Review scores
Source	Rating
Allmusic	3.5/5 stars
Blender	3/5 stars

Poe Little Rich Girl is the debut album by Jacki-O. The album was released on October 26, 2004, by Poe Boy Music Group and TVT Records. The album produced three official singles: "Fine" featuring Ying Yang Twins, "Sugar Walls" and "Break You Off" featuring Jazze Pha. There were also promotional singles "Gangsta Bitch" (which has also a remix featuring Freeway) and "Slow Down". The album hit #95 on the Billboard 200 and #12 on the R&B albums chart in the U.S., selling 20,345 copies in its first week.

The album features Jacki-O's biggest single "Pussy (Real Good)" also known as "Nookie" as well as the remix of "Champion" with Trick Daddy which was featured on her 1st mixtape "The Official Bootlegg" and the Ghostface track "Tooken Back" that also appeared on one of his albums. Jacki-O also sings on this album on the track "Pretty".

== Track listing ==
1. "Living It Up" (featuring O'Damia) (Angela "Jacki-O" Kohn, O. Miller, A. Thellusma) 4:04
2. "Ms Jacki" (A. Kohn, A. Lyon, M. Vallenzano) 3:56
3. "Break You Off" (featuring Jazze Pha) (A. Kohn, P. Alexander) 3:38
4. "Shut the Fuck Up" (Skit) 3:14
5. "Pussy (Real Good)" (featuring Rodney) (A. Kohn, R. Kohn, T. Castillo) 4:24
6. "Fine" (featuring Ying Yang Twins) (A. Kohn, D. Holmes, Michael Crooms, E. Jackson) 3:54
7. "Slow Down" (A. Kohn, Timbaland) 2:59
8. "Sugar Walls" (A. Kohn, Thellusma) 3:53
9. "Holla Back" (Skit) 0:53
10. "Gangsta Bitch" (A. Kohn, Thellusma) 3:02
11. "Somebody's Getting Fucked" (A. Kohn, Thellusma) 3:17
12. "Ghetto World" (featuring O'Damia) (A. Kohn, Bernie Worrell, George Clinton, C. Anderson, R. Ford, O. Miller) 4:18
13. "Sleeping With the Enemy" (featuring Ms Betty Wright) (A. Kohn, Betty Wright, D. Speck) 5:08
14. "Champion" (featuring Trick Daddy) (A. Kohn, Castillo, M. Young) 3:01
15. "Pretty" (A. Kohn, K. Kligo, C. Anderson) 4:17
16. "Sexxy Dance" (A. Kohn, Anderson, W. Lucas, Eric Prince) 3:57
17. "Tooken Back" (featuring Ghostface Killah) (D. Coles, W. Hart, D. Lamb, P. Staples) 5:03
