= I'm a Thug =

2001 single by Trick Daddy

Single by Trick Daddy

from the album Thugs Are Us
- Released: May 24, 2001
- Genre: Hip hop
- Length: 4:14
- Label: Slip-N-Slide; Atlantic
- Songwriter(s): Maurice Young; Adam Duggins; Rafe Van Hoy
- Producer(s): Righteous Funk Boogie

Trick Daddy singles chronology
"Take It to da House" (2001)	"I'm a Thug" (2001)	"I Luv" (2001)

Music video
- "I'm a Thug" on YouTube

"I'm a Thug" is a song by American rapper Trick Daddy, and the second single from his fourth studio album Thugs Are Us (2001). Produced by Righteous Funk Boogie, it peaked at number 17 on the Billboard Hot 100 and is Trick Daddy's second highest-charting song, behind "Let's Go".

== Background and composition ==
The track serves as an ode to Trick Daddy's labelmate Buddy Roe, who at the time was serving a life term in federal prison for possession of cocaine. Lyrically, Trick raps about being perceived as a bad person due to his race and resemblance to a thug, in contrast to who he really is, and condemns the judicial system. The track also features a choir of children singing about being a "thug" with enthusiasm.

== Critical reception ==
Jason Birchmeier of AllMusic cited the song as a highlight of Thugs Are Us.

== Music video ==
The official music video was directed by Nick Quested. In one moment in the video, Trick hands out treats from an ice cream truck to a bunch of kids running toward him.

== Charts ==
Chart (2001)	Peak position
US Billboard Hot 100	17
US Hot R&B/Hip-Hop Songs (Billboard)	8
US Hot Rap Songs (Billboard)	16
US Rhythmic (Billboard)	10
