= Bet That =

Single by Trick Daddy featuring Chamillionaire and Gold Ru$h

from the album Back by Thug Demand
- Released: September 21, 2006
- Recorded: 2006
- Genre: Rap
- Length: 3:52
- Label: Atlantic/Slip-N-Slide Records
- Songwriter(s): Hakeem Seriki/Maurice "Mo" Young/C. Young, Jr/Buddy Long & The Western Melody Boys./Andrew Harr/Jermaine Jackson
- Producer(s): The Runners

Trick Daddy singles chronology
"Sugar (Gimme Some)" (2005)	"Bet That" (2006)	"I'm So Hood" (2007)

Chamillionaire singles chronology
"That Girl" (2006)	"Bet That" (2006)	"King Kong" (2006)

"Bet That" is the first single from Trick Daddy's seventh studio album Back by Thug Demand. The song was released in October 2006. It features Chamillionaire and Gold Ru$h. The song was produced by The Runners; who has produced for various artists including Rick Ross. It premiered on BET's 106 & Park where it was the New Joint of the day on October 30, 2006. The song peaked at No. 66 on the Billboard Hot R&B/Hip-Hop Songs chart. The remix features Ja Rule.
