= Based on a True Story (Trick Daddy album) =

Studio album by Trick Daddy Dollars
- Released: July 29, 1997
- Recorded: 1996–1997
- Studio: 4 Star Studios; Studio Center; Gordi Studio (Miami, FL); Battery Studios (New York, NY)
- Genre: Southern hip hop; gangsta rap; Miami bass; dirty rap
- Length: 1:07:19
- Label: Slip-N-Slide; Warlock
- Producer: Ted "Touche" Lucas (exec.); Darren "DJ Spin" Rudnick; Alvin Clark; Devastator X; Mike "Fresh" McCray; Righteous Funk Boogie; Trak & Tek

Trick Daddy Dollars chronology
Based on a True Story (1997)	www.thug.com (1998)

Professional ratings
Review scores
Source	Rating
AllMusic	1.5/5 stars

Based on a True Story is the debut studio album by American rapper Trick Daddy, and the only studio album released under his 'Trick Daddy Dollars' alias. It was released on July 29, 1997, through Slip-N-Slide and Warlock Records. Production was handled by Alvin Clark, Darren "DJ Spin" Rudnick, Devastator X, Mike "Fresh" McCray, Righteous Funk Boogie, and Trak & Tek. It features guest appearances from Buddy Roe, JT Money, Verb and Jamal. The album peaked at number 59 on the Top R&B/Hip-Hop Albums in the United States.

The album has sold 350,000+ copies. As of 2026, this is his only album to not have the word "thug" in the title.

== Track listing ==
Explicit version
No.	Title	Length
1.	"Based on a True Story, Part I"	2:00
2.	"Based on a True Story, Part II"	3:59
3.	"Oh Me, Oh My"	5:18
4.	"Bout a Lotta Thangs..." (featuring Rodney & Buddy Roe)	4:31
5.	"They Don't Live Long"	3:53
6.	"Kill-A-Head..."	3:47
7.	"Now They Wanna Holler"	4:19
8.	"Going Down Like That"	3:39
9.	"Snowin' in Miami" (featuring Jamal)	5:04
10.	"Smoke Out" (featuring J.T. Money)	3:28
11.	"I'll Be Your Player"	3:16
12.	"I Got Plans" (featuring Buddy Roe)	4:13
13.	"Pimp" (featuring Buddy Roe and J.T. Money)	4:30
14.	"Telephone" (Skit)	0:37
15.	"Ho But You Can't Help It" (featuring Buddy Roe)	3:27
16.	"Gone With Your Bad Self" (featuring Verb)	3:39
17.	"Gone With Your Bad Self" (Bom Bom Mix)	3:43
Total length:		1:07:19

Clean version
No.	Title	Length
1.	"They Don't Live Long"	3:58
2.	"Bout a Lotta Thangs..." (featuring Buddy Roe)	4:01
3.	"Oh Me, Oh My"	3:17
4.	"Kill-A-Head..."	3:43
5.	"Now They Wanna Holler"	4:19
6.	"Going Down Like That"	3:32
7.	"I'll Be Your Player"	3:19
8.	"Based on a True Story, Part II"	3:59
9.	"Pimp" (featuring Buddy Roe and J.T. Money)	4:30
10.	"I Got Plans" (featuring Buddy Roe)	3:55
11.	"Gone With Your Bad Self" (featuring Verb)	3:39
12.	"Gone With Your Bad Self" (Bom Bom Mix)	3:43
Total length:		45:45

== Charts ==
Chart (1998)	Peak position
US Top R&B/Hip-Hop Albums (Billboard)	59
