= Dray Skky =

American songwriter (born 1978)

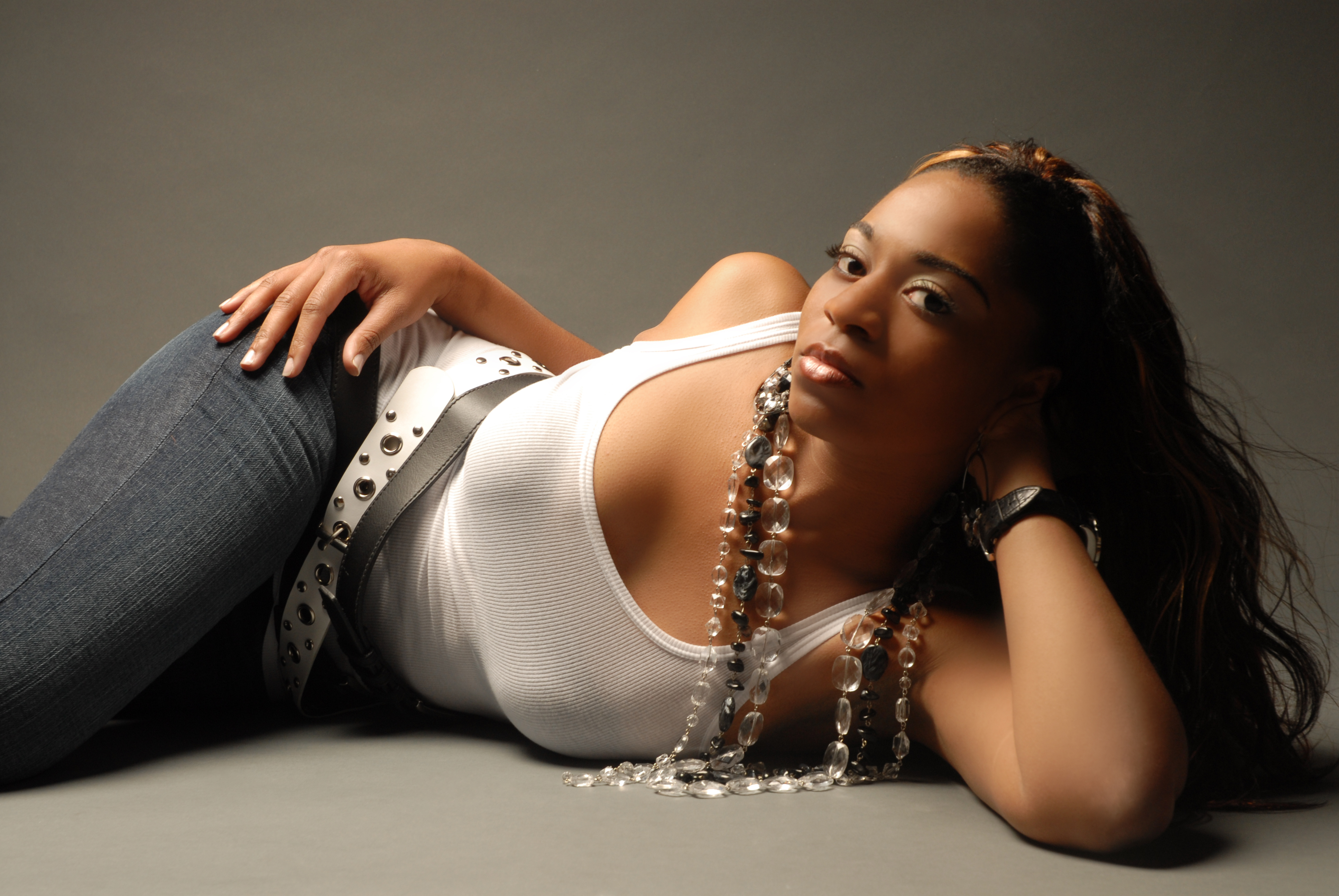

Background information
- Also known as: Skky, Ms Drea, Dray, Skcih
- Born: Andrea Y. Hicks [Skcih] July 8, 1978 (age 48)
- Origin: Columbia, South Carolina, United States
- Genres: Hip hop, R&B, Pop, Gospel, Soul
- Occupation: Singer-songwriter
- Years active: 2005–present
- Labels: Skky Music LLC, A1 Records, Sony/Red
- Website: www.SkkyMusic.com

Dray Skky is an American songwriter born in South Carolina, and raised in Miami, Florida.

== Early life ==
Dray Skky was born in Columbia, South Carolina to Mary Williams and Clifton Hicks. She signed to Millie Lewis Modeling Agency at the age of five and for two years she starred in various department store commercials and advertisements. In elementary school, Skky developed a passion for writing poetry and short stories. When she moved to Carrollton, GA in the third grade, a childhood friend, who played the guitar, convinced Skky to add melody to her poems. This is when Skky realized how much she enjoyed the art of songwriting.

== Career ==
Nicknamed "Skky" by affiliates in the urban market who knew her as a songwriter/vocal arranger, she debut her vocal abilities on Trick Daddy's December 2006 album release Back By Thug Demand. Rumors quickly spread in the Fall of 2007 that Skky had signed with Dunk Ryder Records, teaming up with Trick Daddy, Ice Berg, Fella, and Soup for what would have been an unstoppable combination for the South.

The rumors came to a stop when Dunk Ryder's (the group) signed with Cash Money/Universal and Skky was not part of the deal. In an interview Skky said, "At the time, I wasn't pursuing a singing career, I was more focused on my writing and Trick knew that. In fact, I was actually writing and developing a friend who wasn't the strongest writer, but had an amazing vocal talent. I really wanted to see her be successful.

In 2008, Skky was commissioned to write for an independent pop/rock artist that was signed to A1 Records. The demo provided by Skky included her own vocals, which captured the attention of the label's CEO, James Goosby. In March 2009, after hearing more of Skky's catalog, Goosby convinced Skky to enter a recording contract to release the song "Catch 22", featuring Brisco with Poe Boy Entertainment and produced by GoldRush with Dunk Ryder Records. The song collaboration took place 6 months prior to Skky meeting Goosby, so it was quickly mastered and set for a May release date. The song was rumored to have leaked two weeks early, but the response was so positive, it sparked the decision to proceed with the music video.

Skky filmed the video for "Catch 22" in May 2009 which features Brisco, Tiffany (BET's College Hill South Beach), and K.O. (Alexandra "Lexi" Heller, Shaun Brown, Meagan Crawford, and Rickey Pierre, Skky's official dance team).

During an interview with WEDR (Miami Florida Radio Station) Skky refused to confirm or deny rumors that she parted from her label due to bad dealings from James Goosby, the label owner. Simply stating that the two parted amicably and that James (whom she called "Rev") continues to seek her advice on other artists that he has signed, or considered signing.

In 2010, Dray Skky and her Manager officially formed Skky Music LLC, an Artist Management, Artist Development Company. In the fall of 2010 Skky Music LLC, began developing a group of artists that aspires to join Skky's Management Division (1) Mirani Starr [Female Rapper], (2) Sariyna [Female Singer], (3) UnTuchabel [Male Rapper], (4) Top Flight Generals [Male Rap Group].

Two of Dray Skky's acts were offered recording contracts in 2011 by an independent label. That in label dissolved unexpectedly due to the death of the label's CEO. The loss of "Big Duke" combined with the birth of her first son Skky decided to take a break from the music industry for a while.

In 2016, Dray Skky opened Skky Music Studios in Lexington, SC. She later closed the studio in 2018. She indicated in an interview with Ts Madison, that multiple factors lead to the closure of the studio including her own private battle with Graves Disease.

While Dray Skky has remained pretty silent on social media and in the public since the 2018 closure of the studio, there are hints and glimpses of her working as a songwriter (including more ghostwriting) including a 2019 post on her Facebook Page of her working in a Miami Studio with Platinum Producer Gorilla Tek, a 2020 post on her Facebook Page of her working on new music at Patchwerk Studios in Atlanta, and a 2022 statement made by upcoming teen singer/songwriter Jada Denise on her website www.theylovvejada.com.

== Personal life ==
Dray Skky married long time boyfriend, Harry Damon in June 2015. The two have since birthed four sons together (Skyler, Harrison, Andre, and Aiden). In an interview with Fan Club Project Podcast, Skky stated that she had 7 children, as she has three (3) bonus children from her husband's prior relationships. She stated that their names were Ashley, Jalen, and Briel.

== Influences ==
Dray Skky indicates on her website that some of her influences are: Michael Jackson, Yolanda Adams, Beyoncé, Faith Evans, Mariah Carey, Toni Braxton, and Prince.

== Discography ==
- 1998: Booty Girlz - Self Titled - Song Title(s): Kissing, No Need, With You & It's About Time (Vocal Production, Songwriting & Background Vocals)
- 2001: Dirty South Booty Freaknik - Song Title(s): Take Care of Your Baby, Do you Wanna Dance (Songwriting, Vocals)
- 2006: Booty Girlz - Freak Me Re-Released - Song Title(s): Kissing, No Need, With You & It's About Time (Vocal Production, Songwriting & Background Vocals)
- 2006: Back by Thug Demand - Song Title: You Damn Right
- 2009: Catch 22
- 2010: E.O.S Mixtape / Global South, Inc. - Song Title(s): Bedrock, Keep Him Safe, Like Damn
- 2011: Do or Die 259 - Song Title: Living Large (Songwriter, Background Vocalist)
- 2022: UnWorthy - Featured Artist: Jada Denise (Vocal Production, Songwriting)
