= Finally Famous: Born a Thug, Still a Thug =

Studio album by Trick Daddy
- Released: September 15, 2009
- Recorded: 2007–09
- Studios: Dunk Ryder Studios (Miami, FL)
- Genres: Southern hip-hop; gangsta rap
- Length: 58:51
- Labels: Dunk Ryder; Fontana
- Producers: Trick Daddy (exec.); Chronic Chris; Gold Ru$h; Gorilla Tek; Kane Da Kameleon; Mizzle Boy; OhZee; Schife; The Runners; TracKings Inc; Beat Kings; 314

Trick Daddy chronology
Back by Thug Demand (2006)	Finally Famous: Born a Thug, Still a Thug (2009)	Dunk Ride Or Duck Down!!! (2018)

Alternative cover

Professional ratings
Review scores
Source	Rating
AllMusic	3.5/5 stars
HipHopDX	3.5/5
RapReviews	7/10

Finally Famous: Born a Thug, Still a Thug is the eighth studio album by American rapper Trick Daddy. It was released on September 15, 2009 through Dunk Ryder Records and Fontana Distribution. Production was handled by Gold Ru$h, Chronic Chris, Gorilla Tek, Kane Da Kameleon, Mizzle Boy, Ohzee, Schife, and The Runners among others.

It features guest appearances from Bad Guy, Ball Greezy, Benji Brown, Betty Wright, Desloc, Erin Lynn, Jackie Henton, Janet Lawrence, Kanesha Curry, Kevin Cossom, Murk Champ, Rayzor, Shonie, and the Dunk Ryders. The album debuted at number 34 on the Billboard 200 selling 13,000 copies in its first week. The album was preceded by two singles: "Why They Jock", which peaked at #89 on the Hot R&B/Hip-Hop Songs, and "This Tha Shit That I Live".

As of 2026, Finally Famous: Born a Thug, Still a Thug remains Trick Daddy’s most recent album to date.

== Track listing ==
#	Title	Feature guest(s)	Producer(s)	Time
1	"Intro Skit: Only 1 Mayor"	Rayzor		0:22
2	"This tha Shit That I Live"		Schife & OhZee	4:01
3	"Da Realest"	Kevin Cossom	The Runners	3:41
4	"Gangsta Music"	Ice "Billion" Berg & Fella	Goldru$h	3:30
5	"Skit: The Collection Call"		Kanesha Curry	1:13
6	"Everyday Struggle"	Janet Lawrence	Beat Kings Inc	3:44
7	"What Dey Do"	Bad Guy & Desloc Piccalo	TracKings LLC.	3:25
8	"Count My Money"	Murk Camp	Goldru$h	3:43
9	"Bitch Azz Niggaz"	BallGreezy	Gorilla Tek	3:06
10	"Skit: Macking Jean"	Rayzor		0:10
11	"I Can Tell"		Goldru$h	3:33
12	"Chevy"	Ice "Billion" Berg	Goldru$h	3:27
13	"Why They Jock"	Ice "Billion" Berg & Murk Camp	Mizzle Boy	4:06
14	"Skit: The Mayor's Office"	Benji Brown		1:48
15	"That How We Do It"	Betty Wright	Kane da Kameleon	2:53
16	"Homie Song"		Goldru$h	3:56
17	"Strong Woman"	Jackie Henton	Thr3efourteen of Mega Beat International	3:26
18	"Skit: The Pick Up"	Benji Brown		0:50
19	"Ghetto Supa Star"	Erin Lynn	Chronic Chris	3:31
20	"Tears of a Grown Man"	Shonie	Beat Kings Inc	4:29

== Charts ==
Chart (2009)	Peak position
US Billboard 200	34
US Top R&B/Hip-Hop Albums (Billboard)	9
US Top Rap Albums (Billboard)	6
US Independent Albums (Billboard)	3
