= J-Shin =

- Born: Jonathan Shinhoster; 1978 (age 47–48); Miami, Florida, United States
- Genres: R&B, gospel
- Years active: 1997–present
- Labels: Slip-n-Slide Records, Fat Fred Entertainment, South Beat Records, Gracie Productions, The Orange Music Company, Supa T Records
- Website: https://www.facebook.com/JShinMusicPage

Jonathan "J-Shin" Shinoster is a contemporary R&B/gospel singer born in Liberty City, Florida, who was signed to Slip-n-Slide Records/Atlantic Records and is best known for his hit single "One Night Stand" with LaTocha Scott of Xscape.

== Career ==
He signed with Slip-n-Slide Records in 1999 after appearing on Trick Daddy's single "Hold On." He released his debut album My Soul, My Life the following year, which peaked at #71 on the Billboard 200 and #20 on the R&B/Hip Hop Albums chart. It featured the hit R&B single "One Night Stand" with Xscape member LaTocha Scott which peaked at #18 on the R&B/Hip Hop chart. A follow-up single "Treat U Better" garnered considerable airplay on BET but failed to chart.

In 2003, he signed with Fat Fred Entertainment and released his sophomore album Born to Sing which featured the single "Don't Wanna Fight."

In 2005, he made his acting debut in the film Crossbones as the character "Greedy G."

He later moved to South Beat Records in 2006, releasing his third album All I Got is Love featuring the singles "Send Me an Email" and "If I Fall in Love."

In 2006, his song "Baby Mama Drama" was featured on the late night BET music video show "UnCut."

In 2009, his first mixtape album The R&B General Volume 1 was released.

In 2010, he moved to Gracie Productions and released his fourth album Your Woman Chose Me which was led by the title track as a single. Additionally, another album The Last Shall Be First was released in December. He also appeared on the single "Tear Da Club Up!" with rapper SincereDIB.

In 2012, he signed with The Orange Music Company and released his sixth studio album Reborn.

He released a new single "Dream Chaser" in 2014.

The following year, he signed with Supa T Records and released the single "You Did It, I Did It" which was followed by his seventh album Black Diamond

In 2016, he released the single "Welcome to the M.I.A." in addition to an eighth studio album RealTalk 33147 on his own independent label.

== Discography ==
=== Albums ===
- My Soul, My Life (2000)
- Born to Sing (2003)
- All I Got is Love (2006)
- Your Woman Chose Me (2009)
- The Last Shall Be First (2010)
- Reborn (2012)
- Black Diamond (2015)
- RealTalk 33147 (2016)
- My Way (2018)
- Crunk For Jesus (2020)
- Eleven 0 Seven (2020)
- Red Light (2021)
- Elevation (2022)
- Da Cook Out (2024)
- Therapy (2025)

=== Mixtapes ===
- The R&B General Volume 1 (2009)

=== Singles ===
- "One Night Stand" (with LaTocha Scott) (2000)
- "Treat U Better" (2000)
- "Don't Wanna Fight" (2003)
- "Baby Mama Drama" (2005)
- "Send Me an Email" (2006)
- "If I Fall in Love" (2006)
- "Your Woman Chose Me" (2010)
- "Tear Da Club Up!" (with SincereDIB) (2010)
- "Dream Chaser" (2014)
- "You Did It, I Did It" (2015)
- "Welcome to the M.I.A." (2016)
- "Why You Talking Bout Me" (2017)
- "Looking at Cha Booty" (2017)
- "Close To You" (with Bobby Washington) (2020)
- "Earthquake" (2020)
- "I Do" (with SelfMade Late) (2020)
- "No Wasting Time" (with Money Mark Diggla) (2020)
- "Ride With Me" (2021)
- "Black Roses" (2021)
- "Ghetto Sex" (2021)
- "Into You" (2021)

== External websites ==
- Official Facebook
