= In da Wind =

2002 single by Trick Daddy featuring Big Boi and Cee Lo Green

Single by Trick Daddy featuring Big Boi and Cee Lo Green

from the album Thug Holiday
- Released: June 18, 2002
- Recorded: 2001
- Genre: Hip hop
- Length: 4:20
- Label: Slip-n-Slide, Atlantic
- Songwriter(s): Maurice Young, Antwan Patton, Thomas Callaway, Phalon Alexander
- Producer(s): Jazze Pha

Trick Daddy singles chronology
"I'm a Thug" (2001)	"In da Wind" (2002)	"Thug Holiday" (2002)

Big Boi singles chronology
"85" (2000)	"In da Wind" (2002)	"A.D.I.D.A.S." (2003)

Cee Lo Green singles chronology
"Gettin' Grown" (2002)	"In da Wind" (2002)	"All I Know" (2003)

"In da Wind" is a song by American rapper Trick Daddy. Released as the first single from his fifth studio album Thug Holiday (2002), it features guest appearances from rappers Big Boi and Cee Lo Green and was produced by Jazze Pha, who helped to write the song alongside the three rappers. "In da Wind" peaked at number 70 on the Billboard Hot 100.

== Track listing ==
CD single

1. "In da Wind" (featuring Big Boi and Cee Lo Green) – 4:20

Digital download

1. "In da Wind" (featuring Big Boi and Cee Lo Green) – 4:20

12" single

1. "In da Wind" (featuring Big Boi and Cee Lo Green) – 4:20

== Credits and personnel ==
The credits for "In da Wind" are adapted from the liner notes of Thug Holiday.

Recording

- Recorded at: Stankonia Recording in Atlanta, Georgia.

Personnel

- Trick Daddy – songwriting, vocals
- Big Boi – songwriting, vocals
- Cee Lo Green – songwriting, vocals
- Jazze Pha – production, songwriting
- John Frye – recording, mixing
- Malik Albert – recording
- Warren Bletcher – recording assistant
- Brian "Big Bass" Gardner – mastering

== Charts ==
=== Weekly charts ===
Chart (2002)	Peak position
US Billboard Hot 100	70
US Hot R&B/Hip-Hop Songs (Billboard)	28
US Hot Rap Songs (Billboard)	16
US Rhythmic (Billboard)	19

=== Year-end charts ===
Chart (2002)	Position
US Hot R&B/Hip-Hop Songs (Billboard)	92
