= Nann Nigga =

Single by Trick Daddy featuring Trina

from the album www.thug.com
- Released: July 14, 1998
- Recorded: 1998
- Genre: Dirty rap
- Length: 2:47
- Label: Slip-N-Slide; Warlock Records
- Songwriters: Maurice Young; Katrina Taylor

Trick Daddy singles chronology
"Nann Nigga" (1998)	"Shut Up" (2000)

Trina singles chronology
"Nann Nigga" (1998)	"Shut Up" (2000)

"Nann Nigga", "Nann" in the clean version, is the first single from Trick Daddy's second album, www.thug.com, released in 1998. It features Trina as the song's guest rapper. She is also the love (or lust) interest in the song. The single's popularity helped the label Slip-N-Slide Records to gain national attention.

== Background and composition ==
The song is about Trick Daddy boasting that no one can do anything like him, especially when it comes to loving (or providing carnal pleasure to) Trina. The word "Nann" could be said to mean "no", "none" or "not one"; the resultant statement a double negative typical of southern vernacular: "You don't know "no" nigga like me..." Other possible interpretations could be that "nann" is a disambiguation of the colloquial "nary", meaning "not a" or "not one," "any other," or "never a". "You don't know any other ho..." Trick Daddy's boasting is reciprocated by Trina, with her singing "You don't know nann ho..." towards the middle of the song. It is also possible that "nann" is a contraction of "no damn."

However, AAVE scholars agree that "nann," or more properly, "'n'an'," is properly a contraction of "any other," the phonetic path being 'n'an' < 'ny ath' < any other. This is typical of Southern AAVE rap, which deploys aggressive vowel merging and final dropping to ease rhyming.

== Chart performance ==
The song reached number 62 on the Billboard Hot 100. The single was also successful on Hot Rap Tracks (peaking at number 3; Trick Daddy's best performance on this chart) and Hot R&B/Hip-Hop Singles & Tracks (peaking at number 20).

== Music video ==
The music video for "Nann Nigga" directed by Zodiac Fishgrease features Chico Debarge, J.T. Money and then Indianapolis Colts running back Edgerrin James, who, like Trick Daddy, resides in Miami, Florida.

== Reception ==
Rolling Stone described the single as "visceral" and "bouncing".

== Charts ==
Chart (1999)	Position
U.S. Billboard Hot 100	62
U.S. Hot Rap Tracks	3
U.S. Hot R&B/Hip-Hop Singles & Tracks	20
