= M.A.D.E. =

Studio album by Memphis Bleek
- Released: December 16, 2003
- Recorded: 2002–2003
- Genre: Hip hop
- Labels: Get Low; Roc-A-Fella; Def Jam
- Producers: Coptic; Just Blaze; Scott Storch; Kanye West; T.T.; E Bass; Art & Life; Darryl "Digga" Branch; Zukhan; Robert "Shim" Kirkland

Memphis Bleek chronology
The Understanding (2000)	M.A.D.E. (2003)	534 (2005)

Singles from M.A.D.E.
- 1. "1, 2 Y'all" Released: 2002; 2. "Everything's A Go" Released: April 2003; 3. "Round Here" Released: October 12, 2003

Professional ratings
Review scores
Source	Rating
AllHipHop	3.5/5 stars
AllMusic	3/5 stars
Blender	3/5 stars
Entertainment Weekly	B−
HipHopDX	4/5 stars
RapReviews	8/10
Rolling Stone	3/5 stars
USA Today	3/4 stars
Vibe	3/5 stars

M.A.D.E. (backronym of Money, Attitude, Direction, and Education) is the third studio album by American rapper Memphis Bleek, released by Get Low Records, Roc-A-Fella Records, and Def Jam Recordings. Originally scheduled for a summer 2003 release, the album was released on December 16, 2003. The album reached #35 on the Billboard 200 charts.

The first single released from the album was "Round Here" which features fellow American rappers Trick Daddy and T.I. and production from Just Blaze. The second single was "Need Me In Your Life" which featured Nate Dogg.

== Track listing ==
No.	Title	Writer(s)	Producer(s)	Length
1.	"Roc-a-Fella Get Low Respect It"	Malik Cox; Eric Matlock; Curtis Mayfield	Coptic	3:17
2.	"Everything's a Go" (featuring Jay-Z)	Cox; Shawn Carter; Justin Smith; Thom Bell; Linda Creed	Just Blaze	3:34
3.	"Round Here" (featuring T.I. and Trick Daddy)	Cox; Smith; Clifford Harris; Maurice Young	Just Blaze	5:09
4.	"Just Blaze, Bleek & Free" (featuring Freeway)	Cox; Smith; Leslie Pridgen	Just Blaze	4:15
5.	"We Ballin'" (featuring Young Chris and Proof)	Cox; Scott Storch; Christopher Ries; Obress Guy	Scott Storch	4:25
6.	"Hypnotic" (featuring Jay-Z and Beanie Sigel)	Cox; Carter; Dwight Grant; Smith	Just Blaze	6:14
7.	"I Wanna Love U" (featuring Donell Jones)	Cox; Kanye West; James Ingram; Quincy Jones	Kanye West	3:24
8.	"War"	Cox; Smith	Just Blaze	3:48
9.	"My Life" (featuring Latif)	Cox; Edwin Delahoz; Eric Johnson; Corey Williams	T.T.; E Bass	4:55
10.	"Need Me In Your Life" (featuring Nate Dogg)	Cox; Delroy Andrews; Brian Bridgeman	Art & Life	3:56
11.	"Murda Murda" (featuring Jay-Z and Beanie Sigel)	Cox; Carter; Grant; Scott Storch	Scott Storch	5:22
12.	"Hell No"	Cox; Smith	Just Blaze	4:03
13.	"Hood Muzik" (featuring M.O.P.)	Cox; Darryl Branch; Jamal Grinnage; Eric Murray	Darryl "Digga" Branch	3:15
14.	"Understand Me Still" (featuring Rell)	Cox; Delahoz; Johnson	T.T.; E Bass	4:37
15.	"Do It All Again" (featuring Rell, Lil Cease, and Geda K)	Cox; Zukhan Bey; Gerrell Gaddis; Johnny Bristol	Zukhan	4:54
16.	"1, 2 Y'all" (featuring Jay-Z, Lil Cease and Geda K)	Cox; Robert Kirkland; Johnson; Carter; Gary Grainger; James Lloyd; Renee Scroggins; Valerie Scraggins	Shim; E Bass	5:45
17.	"R.O.C."	Cox; Smith	Just Blaze	3:59

Samples

- "Roc-a-Fella Get Low Respect It" contains a sample from "Ghetto Child", written and performed by Curtis Mayfield.
- "Everything's a Go" contains a sample from "Pieces", written by Thom Bell and Linda Creed, and performed by the Stylistics.
- "I Wanna Love U" contains an interpolation of "P.Y.T. (Pretty Young Thing)", written by James Ingram and Quincy Jones.
- "Do It All Again" contains a sample of "I Wouldn't Change a Thing", written and performed by Johnny Bristol.
- "1, 2 Y'all" contains a sample from "UFO", written by Renee Scroggins and Valerie Scroggins, and performed by ESG.

== Personnel ==
- Kareem "Biggs" Burke – executive producer
- Shawn Carter – executive producer
- Damon Dash – executive producer
- Tony Dawsey – mastering
- Denim – background vocals (6)
- Supa Engineer "Duro" – mixing (16)
- E-Bass – guitars (6)
- Brian Horton – flutes (6)
- Gimel "Young Guru" Keaton – engineer (1, 3, 4, 6, 10–13, 15, 16), mixing (1–6, 8–14, 17)
- Michael Parnin – additional engineering (10)
- Brian Stanley – mixing (7, 15)
- Shane "Bermuda" Woodley – engineer (2, 5, 7–9, 14, 17)

== Charts ==
=== Weekly charts ===
Chart (2003–04)	Peak position
US Billboard 200	35
US Top R&B/Hip-Hop Albums (Billboard)	5

=== Year-end charts ===
Chart (2004)	Position
US Billboard 200	194
US Top R&B/Hip-Hop Albums (Billboard)	38
