= Thug Matrimony: Married to the Streets =

Studio album by Trick Daddy
- Released: October 26, 2004
- Recorded: 2004
- Studio: 4 Star Studios (Miami, FL); TDD Studios (Miami, FL); Circle House Studios (Miami, FL); Mirimode Studios (Jersey City, NJ); The Orange Grove (Los Angeles, CA); Platinum Recording Studios (Miami, FL); Sho'nuff Studios (Atlanta, GA)
- Genre: Southern hip hop; gangsta rap
- Length: 1:04:12
- Label: Slip-N-Slide; Atlantic
- Producer: Ted Lucas (exec.); Bigg D; Box; Chronic Chris; Cool & Dre; Eddie Scoresazy; First Class; Gorilla Tek; Happy Perez; Jazze Pha; J-Boozie; Jim Jonsin; Mike Caren; Milk; Mr. Collipark; Sanchez Holmes; Scott Storch

Trick Daddy chronology
Thug Holiday (2002)	Thug Matrimony: Married to the Streets (2004)	Back by Thug Demand (2006)

Singles from Thug Matrimony: Married to the Streets
- 1. "Let's Go" Released: October 19, 2004; 2. "Sugar (Gimme Some)" Released: January 11, 2005

Professional ratings
Review scores
Source	Rating
AllMusic	4/5 stars
Blender	3/5 stars
Entertainment Weekly	B
HipHopDX	3.5/5
Los Angeles Times	3/4 stars
RapReviews	8/10
The Source	4/5 stars
Stylus Magazine	A−
USA Today	3/4 stars
Vibe	4/5 stars

Thug Matrimony: Married to the Streets is the sixth studio album by American rapper Trick Daddy. It was released on October 26, 2004 via Slip-N-Slide/Atlantic Records. The album debuted at #2 on the Billboard 200 with 145,000 copies sold in the first week released. It was certified Gold by the Recording Industry Association of America on December 1, 2004.

Recording sessions took place at 4-Star Studios, at TDD Studios, at Circle House Studios, at Platinum Recording Studios in Miami, at The Orange Grove in Los Angeles, and at Sho Nuff in Atlanta. Production was handled by several record producers, including Cool & Dre, Gorilla Tek, Jim Jonsin, Mr. Collipark and Scott Storch. It features guest appearances from Jazze Pha, Benji Brown, CeeLo Green, Deuce Komradz, Dirtbag, Kase, Khia, Lil' Jon, Ludacris, Money Mark Diggla, Ron Isley, Smoke, Tampa Tony, T.I., Trey Songz, Trina, Twista, Ying-Yang Twins and Young Jeezy.

The song "Let's Go" was released as the lead single that rocketed the album's success and remains Trick Daddy's most successful single, reaching number 7 on the Billboard Hot 100. It was used in the trailers for 2007 film Stomp the Yard. Mike Caren-produced "Sugar (Gimme Some)" reached number 20 on the Billboard Hot 100 and has a remix with a verse from Lil' Kim. In the music video for "Sugar (Gimme Some)" Ludacris's appearance in the song was replaced by Lil' Kim. The song "J.O.D.D." was used in the 2005 movies The 40-Year-Old Virgin and Into the Blue. The song was also used in the soundtrack of the 2005 racing video game Midnight Club 3: DUB Edition.

== Track listing ==
No.	Title	Writer(s)	Producer(s)	Length
1.	"Fuckin' Around Intro"		Box; J-Boozie; Milk	0:20
2.	"Fuckin' Around" (featuring T.I., Young Jeezy, and Kase)	Maurice Young; Clifford Harris, Jr.; Jay "Young Jeezy" Jenkins; Maurice Marshall; Chris Blanding	Chronic Chris; First Class	3:43
3.	"Let's Go" (featuring Twista and Lil Jon)	M. Young; Carl Mitchell; Jonathan Smith; James Scheffer; Derrick Baker; Marshall; Charles Young; John Osbourne; Robert Daisley; Randy Rhoads	Jim Jonsin; Bigg D	3:42
4.	"Gangsta Livin'"	M. Young; Blanding	Chronic Chris	3:45
5.	"These Are the Daze"	M. Young; Blanding; Louis Johnson; Peggy Jones; Vallery Johnson	Chronic Chris	3:44
6.	"I Wanna Sang"	M. Young; Eddie Hill; Dan Penn; Lindon Oldham	Eddie Scoresazy; Mike Caren^{[a]}; Ted Lucas^{[a]}	4:36
7.	"The Children's Song"	M. Young; Tony Castillo; Ivy Jo Hunter; Vernon Bullock	Gorilla Tek; Brandoe Musician^{[a]}	3:58
8.	"U Neva Know"	M. Young; Carlos Hernandez	First Class	4:19
9.	"Sugar (Gimme Some)" (featuring Ludacris and CeeLo Green)	M. Young; Christopher Bridges; Thomas Callaway; Michael Caren; David Byrne	Mike Caren	4:05
10.	"Skit" (featuring Benji Brown) (removed from clean version)		Box	1:42
11.	"Ménage a Trois" (featuring Jazze Pha, Smoke, and Money Mark Diggla)	M. Young; Phalon Alexander; Shawn Johnson; Mark Seymour; Castillo	Gorilla Tek	4:52
12.	"J.O.D.D." (featuring Khia and Tampa Tony)	M. Young; Khia Chambers; Antonio Alls; Marquinarius Holmes	Sanchez Holmes	3:14
13.	"4 Eva" (featuring Jazze Pha)	M. Young; Alexander; Marvin Tarplin; William Robinson, Jr.	Jazze Pha	4:04
14.	"I Cry" (featuring Ronald Isley)	M. Young; Ronald Isley; Scott Storch; Andre Lyon; Marcello Valenzano	Scott Storch	5:13
15.	"Thugs About" (featuring Dirtbag)	M. Young; Jermany James; Lyon; Valenzano	Cool & Dre	3:59
16.	"Ain't a Thug" (featuring Trey Songz)	M. Young; Tremaine Neverson; Nathan Perez; C. Young; James Harris; Terry Lewis; Terius Gray	Happy Perez	4:45
17.	"Down Wit da South" (featuring Trina, Ying Yang Twins, and Deuce Komradz)	M. Young; Katrina Taylor; Deongelo Holmes; Eric Jackson; Michael Crooms; Vincent Calloway; Bobby Lovelace; William Simmons; Michael Cooper	Beat In Azz	4:11
Total length:				1:04:12

Notes

- ^{^[a]} signifies a co-producer.

Sample credits

- Track 3 contains excerpts from "Crazy Train" written by John Osbourne, Robert Daisley and Randy Rhoads, as performed by Ozzy Osbourne
- Track 5 contains a sample from "Never Leave You Lonely" written by Louis Johnson, Vallery Johnson and Peggy Jones, as performed by The Brothers Johnson
- Track 6 contains a sample from "I'm Your Puppet" written by Linda Olden and Dan Penn, as performed by Foster Sylvers
- Track 7 contains excerpts from "Hold Onto Your Dreams" written by Vernon Bullock and Ivy Jo Hunter, as performed by the Wee Gees
- Track 9 contains an interpolation of "Sugar On My Tongue" written by David Byrne
- Track 13 contains an interpolation of "Cruisin'" written by William Robinson Jr. and Marvin Traplin
- Track 16 contains an interpolation of "If It Isn't Love" written by James Harris and Terry Lewis
- Track 17 contains interpolations of "No Parking On The Dance Floor" written by Vincent Calloway, Bobby Lovelace and William Simmons, and "Ffun" written by Michael Cooper

== Charts ==
=== Weekly charts ===
Chart (2004)	Peak position
Canadian Albums (Nielsen SoundScan)	89
Canadian R&B Albums (Nielsen SoundScan)	28
US Billboard 200	2
US Top R&B/Hip-Hop Albums (Billboard)	1

=== Year-end charts ===
Chart (2004)	Position
US Top R&B/Hip-Hop Albums (Billboard)	88
Chart (2005)	Position
US Billboard 200	118
US Top R&B/Hip-Hop Albums (Billboard)	42

== Certifications ==
Region	Certification	Certified units/sales
United States (RIAA)	Gold	500,000^{^}
^{^} Shipments figures based on certification alone.

== See also ==
- List of number-one rap albums of 2004 (U.S.)
- List of Billboard number-one R&B albums of 2004
