= Shut Up (Trick Daddy song) =

1999 single by Trick Daddy

Single by Trick Daddy featuring Deuce Poppito, Trina and C.O.

from the album Book of Thugs: Chapter AK Verse 47
- Released: 1999
- Genre: Hip hop
- Length: 4:22
- Label: Slip-N-Slide; Atlantic
- Songwriters: Maurice Young; Lasana Smith; Katrina Taylor; C.O.
- Producer: Black Mob Group

Trick Daddy singles chronology
"Nann Nigga" (1998)	"Shut Up" (1999)	"Boy" (2000)

Deuce Poppito singles chronology
"Shut Up" (2000)

Trina singles chronology
"Nann Nigga" (1998)	"Shut Up" (2000)	"Da Baddest Bitch" (1999)

C.O. singles chronology
"Shut Up" (2000)

Music video
- "Shut Up" on YouTube

"Shut Up" is a song by American rapper Trick Daddy, released in 1999 as the lead single from his third studio album Book of Thugs: Chapter AK Verse 47 (2000). It features American rappers Deuce Poppito, Trina and C.O. The song was produced by Black Mob Group.

== Background and composition ==
The instrumental of the song features a riff of trombones and tubas influenced by the music of the marching band of Miami Northwestern Senior High School, where Trick Daddy and Trina graduated from.

== Critical reception ==
Writing for AllMusic, Jason Birchmeier commented, "Above all though, Book of Thugs boasts 'Shut Up,' his rowdiest club-banger yet, also notable for reprising the dynamic Trick Daddy-Trina collaboration that had made 'Nann Nigga' such a success two years earlier." Steve "Flash" Juon of RapReviews praised the song, writing "the thuggish 'Shut Up' has that uniquely chunky horn funk and simple 'Uh-huh, okay, whassup? SHUT UP' chorus that will win fast converts at the club."

== Music video ==
The music video begins with Trick Daddy at an album signing, and leaving due to being badgered by a news reporter asking him if he plans on "doing it again". Trick replies, "I'mma let the band deal wit it." The clip then shows Miami Northwestern High's marching band performing on a football field.

== In popular culture ==
The song is featured on the soundtrack of the 1999 film Any Given Sunday.

== Charts ==
Chart (2000)	Peak position
US Billboard Hot 100	83
US Hot R&B/Hip-Hop Songs (Billboard)	25
US Hot Rap Songs (Billboard)	20
