= Book of Thugs: Chapter AK Verse 47 =

Book of Thugs: Chapter A.K., Verse 47

Studio album by Trick Daddy
- Released: February 15, 2000
- Recorded: 1999–2000
- Studios: 4 Star (Miami, FL)
- Genres: Southern hip hop; gangsta rap
- Length: 53:42
- Labels: Slip-N-Slide; Atlantic
- Producers: Black Mob Group; Darren "DJ Spin" Rudnick; Righteous Funk Boogie; the Committee

Trick Daddy chronology
| www.thug.com (1998) | Book of Thugs: Chapter A.K., Verse 47 (2000) | Thugs Are Us (2001) |

Singles from Book of Thugs: Chapter A.K., Verse 47
- 1. "Shut Up" Released: November 22, 1999

Professional ratings
Review scores
| Source | Rating |
|---|---|
| AllMusic | 3/5 stars |
| Entertainment Weekly | C+ |
| RapReviews | 7/10 |
| Rolling Stone | 3/5 stars |
| The Source | 3.5/5 stars |
| Spin | 6/10 |
| Village Voice | (choice cut) |
| XXL | L (3/5) |

Book of Thugs: Chapter A.K., Verse 47 is the third studio album by American rapper Trick Daddy. It was released on February 15, 2000, via Slip-N-Slide/Atlantic Records. Recording sessions took place at 4 Star Recording Studio. Production was handled by Righteous Funk Boogie, Black Mob Group, DJ Spin, and The Committee, with Ted Lucas serving as executive producer. It features guest appearances from the Lost Tribe, Money Mark Diggla, Buddy Roe, JoVaughn "J.V." Clark, C.O., Duece Poppito, Izm, Mystikal, Society, Trina and Twista. The album peaked at number 26 on the Billboard 200 and number 8 on the Top R&B/Hip-Hop Albums chart. It was certified Gold by the Recording Industry Association of America on May 10, 2000, for sales of over 500,000 copies in the United States. Its lead single, "Shut Up", reached No. 83 on the Billboard Hot 100.

== Track listing ==
| No. | Title | Producer(s) | Length |
|---|---|---|---|
| 1. | "Intro" (performed by Marvin Dixon) | | 0:35 |
| 2. | "Boy" (featuring the Lost Tribe and JV) | Righteous Funk Boogie | 3:55 |
| 3. | "Sittin' on D's" (featuring Izm) | Black Mob Group | 3:30 |
| 4. | "Get on Up" (featuring the Lost Tribe, Money Mark Diggla, and JV) | Righteous Funk Boogie | 4:13 |
| 5. | "America" (featuring Society) | Righteous Funk Boogie | 4:23 |
| 6. | "Shut Up" (featuring Trina, Duece Poppito and C.O.) | Black Mob Group | 4:22 |
| 7. | "Thug for Life" (featuring Kase and Mystic) | The Committee | 3:47 |
| 8. | "Hoe (Skit)" | | 0:35 |
| 9. | "Walkin' Like a Hoe" | Righteous Funk Boogie | 3:57 |
| 10. | "Tryin' to Stop Smokin'" (featuring Mystikal) | Righteous Funk Boogie | 3:39 |
| 11. | "Bout My Money" | Righteous Funk Boogie | 3:52 |
| 12. | "Could It Be" (featuring Twista) | Darren "DJ Spin" Rudnick | 3:48 |
| 13. | "Thug Life Again" (featuring Money Mark Diggla) | Darren "DJ Spin" Rudnick | 3:25 |
| 14. | "Kill Your Ass" (removed from clean version) | Black Mob Group | 3:06 |
| 15. | "Gotta Let You Have It" (featuring Buddy Roe) | Righteous Funk Boogie | 2:54 |
| 16. | "Hoe But Can't Help It" (featuring Buddy Roe) | The Committee | 3:29 |
| 17. | "Outro" (performed by Marvin Dixon) | | 0:12 |
| Total length: | | | 53:42 |

== Personnel ==
- Righteous Funk Boogie – recording, engineering
- JoVaughn Clark – engineering
- Ray Seay – mixing
- Ted Lucas – executive producer
- Solomon Hepburn – co-executive producer
- Thomas Bricker – art direction
- Alan Lewis – creative direction
- Al Freddy – photography
- Lawrence Marano – photography
- Society – cover concept
- Mike Caren – A&R
- Robert Alexander – A&R

== Charts ==
=== Weekly charts ===
| Chart (2000) | Peak position |
|---|---|
| US Billboard 200 | 26 |
| US Top R&B/Hip-Hop Albums (Billboard) | 8 |

=== Year-end charts ===
| Chart (2000) | Position |
|---|---|
| US Billboard 200 | 166 |
| US Top R&B/Hip-Hop Albums (Billboard) | 52 |

== Certifications ==
| Region | Certification | Certified units/sales |
|---|---|---|
| United States (RIAA) | Gold | 500,000^{^} |
^{^} Shipments figures based on certification alone.
