= Dray (name) =

Dray is both a surname and a given name. Notable people with the name include:

- Julie Dray, French actress
- Julien Dray (born 1955), French politician
- Tevian Dray (born 1956), American mathematician
- Walter Dray (1886–1973), American track and field athlete
- William Herbert Dray (1921–2009), Canadian philosopher of history
- Dray Skky, American songwriter
- Dray Prescot, protagonist of a series of science fiction novels by Kenneth Bulmer (under the pseudonym Alan Burt Akers)
