= Take It to da House =

Single by Trick Daddy featuring The Slip-N-Slide Express

from the album Thugs Are Us
- Released: February 6, 2001
- Recorded: 2000
- Genre: Hip hop
- Length: 3:46
- Label: Slip-N-Slide; Atlantic
- Songwriters: Maurice Young; Katrina Taylor; Richard Finch; Harry Casey; James Brown; Fred Wesley; Charles Bobbit; Marcus Seymour; Corey Evans; JoVaughn Clark; Adam Duggins; James Scheffer
- Producers: Righteous Funk Boogie; Jim Johnson

Trick Daddy singles chronology
| "Shut Up" (2000) | "Take It to da House" (2001) | "I'm a Thug" (2001) |

"Take It to da House" is a song by Trick Daddy, released as the first single from his fourth studio album, Thugs Are Us. The song features verses by Slip-N-Slide representatives, Sung, Money Mark, J.V., Trina, and C.O. They all went under the alias 'the Slip-N-Slide Express'. The song heavily samples "Boogie Shoes" by KC and the Sunshine Band and also contains samples from James Brown's "The Boss". The song was featured in the films Osmosis Jones, The Real Cancun, and Are We Done Yet?. It also plays in the end credits of Nickelodeon Magazine's Big 10th Birthday Special.

"Take It to da House" placed at No. 23 on the Billboard Hot R&B/Hip-Hop Singles & Tracks chart and No. 20 on the Hot Rap Singles chart.

== Charts ==
=== Weekly charts ===
| Chart (2001) | Peak position |
|---|---|
| US Billboard Hot 100 | 50 |
| US Hot R&B/Hip-Hop Songs (Billboard) | 23 |
| US Hot Rap Songs (Billboard) | 20 |
| US Rhythmic Airplay (Billboard) | 11 |

=== Year-end charts ===
| Chart (2001) | Position |
|---|---|
| US Hot R&B/Hip-Hop Songs (Billboard) | 95 |

== Release history ==
| Region | Date | Format(s) | Label(s) | Ref. |
|---|---|---|---|---|
| United States | February 6, 2001 | Urban contemporary radio | Slip-n-Slide, Atlantic | |
| United States | February 13, 2001 | Rhythmic contemporary radio | Slip-n-Slide, Atlantic | |
