= Back by Thug Demand =

Studio album by Trick Daddy
- Released: December 18, 2006
- Recorded: 2005–06
- Studios: PatchWerk Recording Studios (Atlanta, GA); Circle House Studios (Miami, FL); Dunk Ryders Studio (Miami, FL); Hit Factory Criteria (Miami, FL); Zac Studios (Atlanta, GA); Icon Studios (Miami, FL)
- Genres: Southern hip hop; gangsta rap
- Length: 54:40
- Labels: Slip-N-Slide; Atlantic
- Producers: Ted "Touche" Lucas (exec.); Bigg D; Cool & Dre; Gold Ru$h; Gorilla Tek; Kane Beatz; Khao; Mannie Fresh; The Runners

Trick Daddy chronology
Thug Matrimony: Married to the Streets (2004)	Back by Thug Demand (2006)	Finally Famous: Born a Thug, Still a Thug (2009)

Singles from Back by Thug Demand
- 1. "Bet That" Released: September 21, 2006

Professional ratings
Review scores
Source	Rating
AllMusic	3.5/5 stars
HipHopDX	3.5/5
PopMatters	6/10
RapReviews	7.5/10
The Skinny	2/5 stars

Back by Thug Demand is the seventh studio album by American rapper Trick Daddy. It was released on December 18, 2006 through Slip-n-Slide Records and Atlantic Records. Recording sessions took place at Dunk Ryders Studio, Circle House Studios, the Hit Factory Criteria-Miami, and Icon Studios in Miami, at PatchWerk Recording Studios and Zac Studios in Atlanta. Production was handled by Gold Ru$h, The Runners, Kane Beatz, Cool & Dre, Bigg D, Gorilla Tek, Khao, and Mannie Fresh. It features guest appearances from Fiend, 8Ball, Birdman, Chamillionaire, Dray Skky, Dunk Ryders, Gold Ru$h, Jaheim, Rick Ross, Trey Songz, Trina, Webbie, Young Buck and Young Steff.

Book of Thugs: Part II was the tentative title name for the album before he changed it. The first single for the album is "Bet That" featuring Chamillionaire and Gold Rush, with production from The Runners. The second single was going to be "Straight Up" featuring Young Buck, but it was changed to "Tuck Ya Ice" featuring Birdman.

== Track listing ==
No.	Title	Writer(s)	Producer(s)	Length
1.	"The Big Pookie Interview"			0:50
2.	"Breaka Breaka"	Maurice Young; Andrew Harr; Jermaine Jackson; Charles Young Jr.; Corey Evans; Mark Seymour	The Runners	3:34
3.	"Straight Up" (featuring Young Buck)	Young; David Brown; Buddy Long; Young Jr.	Goldrush	4:19
4.	"The Commentator"			1:29
5.	"Bet That" (featuring Chamillionaire and Goldrush)	Young; Hakeem Seriki; Long; Harr; Jackson; Young Jr.	The Runners	3:52
6.	"10-20-Life"	Young; Long; Young Jr.	Goldrush	4:59
7.	"Tuck Ya Ice" (featuring Birdman)	Young; Bryan Williams; Daniel Johnson	Kane Beatz	4:23
8.	"Booty Doo" (featuring Webbie and International Jones)	Young; Webster Gradney Jr.; Richard Jones Jr.; Kevin Cates; Young Jr.	Khao	4:18
9.	"Born a Thug"	Young; Long; Young Jr.	Goldrush	4:18
10.	"TDD"			1:00
11.	"Lights Off" (featuring International Jones)	Young; Jones Jr.; Johnson; Young Jr.	Kane Beatz	3:39
12.	"Tonight" (featuring Jaheim and Trina)	Young; Tony Castillo; Amir Williams	Gorilla Tek	4:24
13.	"You Damn Right" (featuring the Dunk Ryders and Skky)	Young; Davevon Rackley; Kenya Brockington; Teiron Robinson; Long	Goldrush	5:01
14.	"Chevy" (featuring Young Steff)	Young; Byron Thomas; Young Jr.; Seymour	Mannie Fresh; Adonis Shropshire^{[v]}; Big Steff^{[v]}	4:05
15.	"So High" (featuring Trey Songz and 8Ball)	Young; Tremaine Neverson; Premro Smith; Derrick Baker; Young Jr.	Bigg D	4:29
Total length:				54:40

Bonus tracks
No.	Title	Producer(s)	Length
16.	"Drop (Low, Low, Low)" (featuring the Dartmouth High School Marching Band)	Jim Jonsin	3:03
17.	"Duck Down" (featuring Plies and Notorious B.I.G.)	Perion	4:25
18.	"I Pop"	Disco D	2:55

Target bonus tracks
No.	Title	Producer(s)	Length
19.	"I'm So Hood" (featuring Rick Ross, Plies and T-Pain)	The Runners; DJ Khaled	4:17
20.	"Bitch I'm From Dade County" (featuring Trina, Rick Ross, Brisco, Flo-Rida, C-Ride and Dre)	The Diaz Brothers; DJ Khaled	5:48
21.	"Born-N-Raised" (featuring Pitbull, Rick Ross and DJ Khaled)	The Runners	4:16

Notes

- ^{^[v]} signifies a vocal producer.

== Charts ==
=== Weekly charts ===
Chart (2007)	Peak position
US Billboard 200	48
US Top R&B/Hip-Hop Albums (Billboard)	10
US Top Rap Albums (Billboard)	5

=== Year-end charts ===
Chart (2007)	Position
US Top R&B/Hip-Hop Albums (Billboard)	54
