= Thug Holiday =

2002 album by Trick Daddy

Studio album by Trick Daddy
- Released: August 6, 2002
- Recorded: 2001–02
- Studio: Patchwerk Studios, Atlanta, Georgia
- Genre: Southern hip hop; gangsta rap
- Length: 1:08:48
- Label: Slip-N-Slide; Atlantic
- Producer: Ted "Touche" Lucas (exec.); Cool & Dre; David Banner; Deep Fried Camp; Gorilla Tek; Jazze Pha; Darren "D.J Spin" Rudnick; Lil' Jon; Majid "Chi" Hasan; Minnesota; Red Spyda; Reef; Sean "Face" Foote; Signature; Supa a.k.a. Infa Red; DJ Nabs

Trick Daddy chronology
Thugs Are Us (2001)	Thug Holiday (2002)	Thug Matrimony: Married to the Streets (2004)

Singles from Thug Holiday
- 1. "In da Wind" Released: June 18, 2002; 2. "Thug Holiday" Released: 2002

Professional ratings
Review scores
Source	Rating
AllMusic	3/5 stars
HipHopDX	3.5/5
RapReviews	7.5/10
Robert Christgau	(dud)
Rolling Stone	3/5 stars

Thug Holiday is the fifth studio album by American rapper Trick Daddy. It was released on August 6, 2002 through Slip-N-Slide/Atlantic Records. Production was handled by Gorilla Tek, Supa a.k.a. Infa Red, Red Spyda, Cool & Dre, David Banner, Deep Fried Camp, Jazze Pha, Jim Jonsin, Lil' Jon, Majid "Chi" Hasan, Minnesota, Rob "Reef" Tewlow, Sean "Face" Foote, Signature, and DJ Nabs, with Ted Lucas serving as executive producer. It features guest appearances from Tre+6, Rick Ross, Supa a.k.a. Infa Red, Duece Poppito, Big Boi, Big LEXX, Birdman, CeeLo Green, Denny, LaTocha Scott, Milk, Mystic, Scarface, and Betty Wright's Children's Choir. The album debuted at number 6 on the Billboard 200 with 129,500 copies sold in the first week released. A month later the album was certified gold by the Recording Industry Association of America for an excess of 500,000 copies.

== Track listing ==
No.	Title	Producer(s)	Length
1.	"Who's Selling (Skit)" (featuring Big LEXX, Denny, and Milk)		0:27
2.	"All I Need" (featuring Supa a.k.a. Infa Red)	Supa a.k.a. Infa Red	3:57
3.	"In da Wind" (featuring Cee-Lo and Big Boi)	Jazze Pha	4:20
4.	"Gangsta" (featuring Baby and Scarface)	Minnesota	4:03
5.	"Thug Holiday" (featuring LaTocha Scott)	David Banner	4:54
6.	"She's Fiendin' (Skit)"		0:55
7.	"Play No Games"	Lil' Jon	3:43
8.	"Let Me Ride" (featuring Rick Ross)	Cool & Dre	3:50
9.	"Rock N Roll Nigga" (featuring Money Mark Diggla)	Deep Fried Camp	3:39
10.	"Rags to Riches" (featuring Tre+6)	Gorilla Tek	4:35
11.	"Bout Mine" (featuring Money Mark Diggla, Rick Ross, Duece Poppito, and Mystic)	Gorilla Tek	4:06
12.	"Ain't No Santa"	Red Spyda	3:46
13.	"SNS / Roland (Skit)" (featuring Tre+6 and Duece Poppito)	Signature	4:27
14.	"Get That Feeling" (featuring Rick Ross)	Majid "Chi" Hasan; Sean "Face" Foote	3:13
15.	"God's Been Good" (featuring Betty Wright's Children's Choir)	Darren "DJ Spin" Rudnick	3:15
16.	"Rain It Pours"	Rob "Reef" Tewlow	4:14
17.	"Money & Drugs" (featuring Supa a.k.a. Infa Red)	Supa a.k.a. Infa Red	3:20
18.	"In da Wind (Ride Out Mix)" (featuring Cee-Lo and Big Boi)	DJ Nabs	4:17
19.	"Ain't No Santa (Bonus Mix)"	Red Spyda	3:47
Total length:			1:08:48

== Charts ==
=== Weekly charts ===
Chart (2002)	Peak position
US Billboard 200	6
US Top R&B/Hip-Hop Albums (Billboard)	2

=== Year-end charts ===
Chart (2002)	Position
US Billboard 200	142
US Top R&B/Hip-Hop Albums (Billboard)	41

== Certifications ==
Region	Certification	Certified units/sales
United States (RIAA)	Gold	500,000^{^}
^{^} Shipments figures based on certification alone.
