= Thugs Are Us =

Studio album by Trick Daddy
- Released: March 20, 2001
- Recorded: 2000–2001
- Genre: Southern hip hop; gangsta rap
- Length: 1:02:33
- Label: Slip-N-Slide; Atlantic
- Producer: Ted "Touche" Lucas (exec.); Black Mob Group; Righteous Funk Boogie; Jim Jonsin; J-Roc; Mr. Charlie; Roc; Saint Benson; Styles; The Committee

Trick Daddy chronology
Book of Thugs: Chapter AK Verse 47 (2000)	Thugs Are Us (2001)	Thug Holiday (2002)

Singles from Thugs Are Us
- 1. "Take It to da House" Released: February 6, 2001; 2. "I'm a Thug" Released: May 24, 2001

Professional ratings
Review scores
Source	Rating
AllMusic	4/5 stars
HipHopDX	3.5/5
RapReviews	6/10
Robert Christgau	(2-star Honorable Mention)
Rolling Stone	3.5/5 stars

Thugs Are Us is the fourth studio album by American rapper Trick Daddy. It was released on March 20, 2001 via Slip-N-Slide/Atlantic Records. Production was handled by Righteous Funk Boogie, The Committee, Black Mob Group, Jim Jonsin, J-Roc, Mr. Charlie, Roc, Saint Benson, and Styles, with Ted Lucas serving as executive producer. It features guest appearances from Duece Poppito, Tre+6, JoVaughn "J.V." Clark, Trina, Society, Kase and Migraine.

The album debuted at number 4 on the US Billboard 200 with 116,000 copies sold in the first week released. Its lead single, "Take It to da House" peaked at number 50 on the Billboard Hot 100, while its second single, "I'm a Thug", reached number 17 on the Billboard Hot 100, making it the rapper's second highest charting single. The album has also been platinum by the Recording Industry Association of America with an excess of 1.8 million copies sold, making it Trick Daddy's best selling album.

== Track listing ==
No.	Title	Writer(s)	Producer(s)	Length
1.	"Intro" (removed from clean version)			0:33
2.	"I'm a Thug"	Maurice Young; Adam Ernest Duggins; Rafe Van Hoy	Righteous Funk Boogie	4:14
3.	"Where U From" (featuring Trina and Duece Poppito)	Young; Katrina Taylor; Lasana Smith; James Scheffer	Jim Jonsin	4:53
4.	"Noodle" (featuring Tre+6)	Mark Seymour; Corey Evans; Roc	Roc	3:35
5.	"Take It to da House" (featuring Righteous Funk Boogie, Money Mark Diggla, JV, Trina, and C.O.)	Young; Duggins; Seymour; JoVaughn Clark; Taylor; Evans; Charles Bobbit; Fred Wesley; James Brown; Harry Wayne Casey; Richard Finch	Righteous Funk Boogie	3:46
6.	"Thump In The Trunk (Skit)"			1:13
7.	"Can't Fuck with the South" (featuring JV)	Young; Clark; Duggins	Righteous Funk Boogie	3:58
8.	"Survivin' the Drought" (featuring Duece Poppito)	Smith; Saint Benson	Saint Benson	3:47
9.	"Pull Over (Remix)" (featuring Trina, Kase, and Duece Poppito)	Young; Taylor; Maurice Marshall; Smith; The Committee; Herman Kelly	The Committee	3:31
10.	"Have My Cheese" (featuring JV and Money Mark Diggla)	Young; Clark; Seymour; Tony Castillo	The Committee	2:54
11.	"Bricks and Marijuana" (featuring Kase)	Young; Marshall; Duggins	Righteous Funk Boogie	4:07
12.	"N Word" (featuring Tre+6 and Duece Poppito) (removed from clean version)	Young; Seymour; Evans; Smith; Styles	Styles	3:08
13.	"99 Problems" (featuring Tre+6) (removed from clean version)	Seymour; Evans; Mr. Charlie	Mr. Charlie	3:04
14.	"For All My Ladies" (featuring Trina)	Taylor; Duggins	Righteous Funk Boogie	3:23
15.	"The Hotness" (featuring Society and DJ Khaled)	Marcus Effinger; Black Mob	Black Mob Group	4:32
16.	"Somebody Shoulda Told Ya" (featuring Migraine)	Young; Sidney Doe Landfair; Jason Roper	Jason "Jay Roc" Roper and Thomas "Big Tom aka Chevy Boy" Bonnie	3:51
17.	"Amerika" (featuring Society)	Young; Effinger	Righteous Funk Boogie	4:23
18.	"Duece Poppi Snippet (Bonus Track)" (featuring Duece Poppito)			3:42
Total length:				1:02:33

Sample credits

- Track 2 contains a sample of "Cheatin Is" performed by Millie Jackson
- Track 5 contains excerpts from "The Boss" performed by James Brown, and "Boogie Shoes" performed by KC and the Sunshine Band
- Track 9 contains a sample of "Dance to the Drummer's Beat" as performed by Herman Kelly and Life

== Charts ==
=== Weekly charts ===
Chart (2001)	Peak position
US Billboard 200	4
US Top R&B/Hip-Hop Albums (Billboard)	2

=== Year-end charts ===
Chart (2001)	Position
US Billboard 200	73
US Top R&B/Hip-Hop Albums (Billboard)	35

== Certifications ==
Region	Certification	Certified units/sales
United States (RIAA)	Platinum	1,000,000^{^}
^{^} Shipments figures based on certification alone.
