= Nick & Norah's Infinite Playlist (soundtrack) =

Nick & Norah's Infinite Playlist: Original Motion Picture Soundtrack

Soundtrack album by Various artists
- Released: September 23, 2008
- Genre: Film soundtrack
- Length: 55:52
- Label: Atlantic
- Producers: Linda Cohen; Myron Kerstein; Peter Sollett

Nick & Norah's Infinite Playlist: Original Motion Picture Soundtrack is the soundtrack to the 2008 film of the same name, released on September 23, 2008, by Atlantic Records. The album features 15 tracks, including songs from The Dead 60s, Band of Horses, The Submarines, We Are Scientists, Chris Bell, Bishop Allen, Takka Takka, and Vampire Weekend. Directed by Peter Sollett with a screenplay written by Lorene Scafaria, based on the eponymous novel written by Rachel Cohn and David Levithan, the film stars Michael Cera and Kat Dennings. The music for the film was selected by Sollett, along with editor Myron Kerstein and music supervisor Linda Cohen. The album received generally positive critical reception.

== Background ==
Cohn and Levithan's novel had several musical references, including songs by the Cure and Green Day, as did Scafaria's screenplay. She originally submitted with a CD mix featuring her ideas for the film's soundtrack, that included songs by The Black Keys, Bloc Party, and Frou Frou. However, in the final cut of the film, most of the music was chosen by Sollett, along with Kerstein and Cohen. Sollett said that he "got lucky" with the songs that he was able to choose because, within the financiers and the studio, "there was nobody in that group who knew all that much about music or the music that we had in the film". His objective when selecting the music was to find "the best music you haven't heard yet", primarily from bands based in New York City, which was "additive to the film and each individual scene". While filming in New York, he emailed songs "right out of my iTunes [library]" which he thought would suit particular scenes to Kerstein, who was in Los Angeles assembling the film as it was shot.

== Track listing ==
No.	Title	Performers	Length
1.	"Speed of Sound"	Chris Bell	5:11
2.	"Lover"	Devendra Banhart	3:40
3.	"Middle Management"	Bishop Allen	2:44
4.	"Ottoman"	Vampire Weekend	4:02
5.	"Riot Radio"	The Dead 60s	2:22
6.	"Fever"	Takka Takka	3:12
7.	"Xavia"	The Submarines	4:34
8.	"After Hours"	We Are Scientists	3:52
9.	"Our Swords"	Band of Horses	2:26
10.	"Silvery Sleds"	Army Navy	4:15
11.	"Baby, You're My Light"	Richard Hawley	2:54
12.	"Very Loud"	Shout Out Louds	4:05
13.	"How to Say Goodbye"	Paul Tiernan	3:28
14.	"Last Words"	The Real Tuesday Weld	4:57
15.	"Nick and Norah's Theme"	Mark Mothersbaugh	5:10

iTunes exclusive
No.	Title	Performers	Length
16.	"Screw the Man"	The Jerk Offs	2:02
17.	"Negative"	Project Jenny and Project Jan	4:37
18.	"Trust Your Stomach"	Marching Band	3:20
19.	"Electro-Socket Blues"	Rogue Wave	3:59

== Reception ==
Andrew Leahey of AllMusic says that the soundtrack "serves as a nice sampler of emerging music in 2008" along with the soundtrack of American Teen. Jim Farber of Daily News also reviewed the album positively. Writing for Blogcritics, Jen Johans reviewed that, the album "provides a terrific capper to a stellar album of mostly obscure artists. And no doubt that’s part of the reason they’re so damn cool and warrant including in a film about knowledgeable and hip music fans that you probably wouldn’t see caught dead listening to adult contemporary radio or Hannah Montana."

Spence D. of IGN rated 8.4 (out of 10) to the album and admitted that it does an excellent job on "creating a compact and linear expanse of emotions, building upon the time honored musical core of guitar and voice and the equally lasting nuances of melancholy, longing, and love. While focused a little too heavily on the years between 2007 and 2008, there are still some eye-opening surprises (Chris Bell being the prime example) that have managed to sneak their way into the mix. This all makes for a rather enjoyable listen that hopefully will be the jumping off point into new musical terrain for many and a familiar comfort to others." Drake Lelane of MTV News commented: "the best soundtracks always take on the character of the movie they accompany, and vice versa, and that's certainly the case with Nick and Norah's Infinite Playlist."

Contrarily, the music also received negative reviews. In their review roundup for the best of music in 2008, The Playlist called it as "totally disposable". Paul Thompson of Pitchfork gave 5.2/10 to the album and wrote "One has to wonder what exactly the point of a soundtrack like this is in 2008, where folks could just as easily download the songs – even the ones, gasp, that didn't make it to the disc – for the jumpoffs of their own infinite playlists. For this product to have relevance commercially or otherwise, the songs on it have to matter, and with the exception of a great Vampire Weekend tune and some frequently great (just-so-happens-to-be-indie-)pop, it doesn't matter enough not to just burn yourself." Phoebe Reilly of Spin wrote "But shouldn't a film that references a playlist in its title at least register on the Good Use Of Song to Important Adolescent Moment ratio? Somehow, it doesn't."

== Charts ==
Chart (2008)	Peak position
US Billboard 200	44
US Top Soundtracks (Billboard)	2

== Personnel ==
Credits adapted from CD liner notes.

- Craig Rosen – A&R administration
- Jessica Fuller – soundtrack co-ordinator
- Thanh Nguyen – soundtrack co-ordinator
- Andrew Miano – executive producer
- Kerry Kohansky – executive producer
- Kevin Weaver – executive soundtrack producer
- Lia Vollack – executive soundtrack producer
- Peter Sollett – album production, liner notes
- Megan Joyce – business and legal affairs
- Justin Smith – mastering
- Linda Cohen – music supervision, album production
- Myron Kerstein – album production
- James Lopez – marketing director
- Katie Robinson – marketing director
- Paul Kremen – music marketing consultant
