= Let's Go (Trick Daddy song) =

2004 single by Trick Daddy featuring Twista and Lil Jon

Single by Trick Daddy featuring Twista and Lil Jon

from the album Thug Matrimony: Married to the Streets
- Released: September 18, 2004 (US); February 14, 2005 (UK)
- Genre: Rap rock
- Length: 3:43
- Label: Atlantic; Slip-n-Slide
- Songwriters: Maurice Young; Carl Mitchell; Jonathan Smith; James Scheffer; Derrick Baker; John Osbourne; Robert Daisley; Randall Rhoads
- Producers: Bigg D; Jim Jonsin

Trick Daddy singles chronology
"What's Happenin!" (2004)	"Let's Go" (2004)	"Sugar (Gimme Some)" (2005)

Twista singles chronology
"So Sexy Chapter II (Like This)" (2004)	"Let's Go" (2004)	"Hope" (2005)

Lil Jon singles chronology
"Real Gangstaz" (2004)	"Let's Go" (2004)	"Okay" (2004)

Music video
- "Let's Go" on YouTube

"Let's Go" is a song by American rapper Trick Daddy, released as the first single from his 2004 sixth studio album Thug Matrimony: Married to the Streets. It features Twista and Lil Jon and was produced by Jim Jonsin and Bigg D. The song became a top ten hit, reaching number 7 on the Billboard Hot 100, making it Trick Daddy's most successful single of his career. The song samples "Crazy Train" by Ozzy Osbourne. It was used in the films Stomp the Yard (2007) and Neighbors (2014), the extended trailer for Megamind (2010), and the second trailer for The SpongeBob Movie: Search for SquarePants (2025). In 2019, the song is also heard during the trailer for a new mode in Gears 5 called Escape. Despite the sample already being cleared with Osbourne's publishing, Osbourne had not listened to the song until February 2021 when producer Andrew Watt played him the song to his approval.

A remix of the song that is completely produced by Lil Jon is featured on the bonus CD of Lil Jon & the East Side Boyz's album Crunk Juice.

== Charts ==
=== Weekly charts ===
Chart (2004–2005)	Peak position
Australia (ARIA)	35
Canada CHR/Pop Top 30 (Radio & Records)	10
Ireland (IRMA)	27
Eurochart Hot 100 Singles	73
Scottish Singles Sales (Official Charts)	35
UK Singles (Official Charts)	26
UK Hip Hop/R&B (Official Charts)	10
US Billboard Hot 100	7
US Hot R&B/Hip-Hop Songs (Billboard)	10
US Hot Rap Songs (Billboard)	4
US Pop Airplay (Billboard)	10
US Rhythmic Airplay (Billboard)	4

=== Year-end charts ===
Chart (2005)	Position
US Hot R&B/Hip-Hop Songs (Billboard)	90

== Release history ==
Region	Date	Format(s)	Label(s)	Ref.
United States	September 14, 2004	Contemporary hit · rhythmic contemporary · urban contemporary radio	Slip-n-Slide, Atlantic	
