= Jacki-O =

American rapper

- Born: Angela Faye Kohn; November 24, 1973 (age 52); Miami, Florida, U.S.
- Genre: Hip-hop
- Occupations: Rapper; author; songwriter
- Years active: 2000–2014
- Labels: Warner Bros. Records Inc; TVT; Jack Movement; Poe Boy
- Children: 1

Angela Faye Kohn (born November 24, 1973), known professionally as Jacki-O, is a Haitian-American rapper who is signed to Poe Boy Entertainment. She gained recognition with her 2003 single "Nookie (Real Good)", which was featured on her debut album, Poe Little Rich Girl (2004). The album peaked at number 95 on the Billboard 200.

Following her 2003 hit “Nookie”, she released "Sugar Walls" in 2004 as the next single ahead of her debut album Poe Little Rich Girl. She also released the single "Fine" in 2004 featuring the Ying Yang Twins, which peaked at No. 53 on the Billboard Hot Hip-Hop. She released her second album '"Li Red Riding Hood" (2009), with her single "I Got Yo Boyfriend" peaking at No. 67 on the Billboard Hot Hip-Hop. Her single "Picture Perfect" also made national charts peaking at No. 72 on the Billboard Hot Hip-Hop.

== Early life ==
Angela Faye Kohn was born on November 24, 1973, in Miami, Florida and grew up in the Liberty Square projects of the Liberty City neighborhood. Her father is Haitian, while her mother, was African American. She has two sisters and two brothers. While in middle school, she began shoplifting. She also started writing poetry and began freestyle rappping at Miami Northwestern Senior High School. She dropped out of high school during her sophomore year after she got pregnant, but later earned a GED. Kohn began trafficking crack cocaine and became a local street dealer. She gave birth to a daughter.

== Writing ==
Jacki-O's first novel is called Grown & Gangsta (2008), described as an "urban tale". She released her autobiography, Relentless in 2010, which detailed her life as a rapper mixed up with drugs in Miami, and her effort to turn her life around.

== Hip hop feuds ==
=== Foxy Brown ===
On April 23, 2005, an altercation occurred between Jacki-O and Foxy Brown at Circle House Studios in Miami, Florida. Jacki-O stated that her refusal to "bow down" to Brown was the prime motive in the physical altercation. A day following the incident, she stated to MTV News: "I just know that yesterday I did not go there to get in no altercation.more."

=== Khia ===
In the leadup to the release of Khia's second album Gangstress in 2006, defeated and she made disparaging comments about Jacki-O in magazine interviews. At the first annual Ozone Magazine Awards in 2006, both rappers were in attendance and claimed to be the "Queen of the South" onstage while presenting awards. Jacki-O had her crew and bodyguards dressed in shirts that said "Fuck Khia" on the front and "Jacki-O Queen of the South!" on the back. Khia responded to the shirts by saying, "It's promotion for me. I thanked them. It's marketing and promotion. I'm so happy about that!" Later, Jacki-O dropped a diss track against Khia called "Pop Off." In response, Khia dropped a diss track called "Hit Her Up," in which she repeatedly insinuated that Jacki-O was transgender.

=== DJ Khaled ===
Although Jacki-O gave DJ Khaled a positive shoutout in her 2004 mixtape The Official Bootleg, she claimed that he did not truly support Miami rappers in a 2010 interview with XXL Mag. In the interview, Jacki-O said that she believed Khaled felt more powerful as a DJ than artists themselves, and further claimed that Khaled only pretended to be from Miami.

== Personal life ==
Before fame, Jacki-O was arrested for various crimes — including shoplifting, trafficking cocaine, aggravated assault, and carrying a concealed firearm.

Jacki-O revealed that once she started making money from music, her mother still distrusted her and refused to go to the bank with her. In January 2006, in an attempt to break her recording contract with Poe Boy Entertainment, Jacki-O filed for Chapter 7 bankruptcy - declaring debts of $144,225 and assets of $1,340. Later that year, she was arrested for shoplifting twice - once from Neiman Marcus and later from Bal Harbor.

In a 2008 interview with Hip Hop Weekly magazine, Jacki-O claimed that she was forced to have sex with a Poe Boy Entertainment executive to receive a $10,000 advance that she was previously promised. Although she received backlash for discussing her experience, she remained adamant that she was not glorifying having sex for money and that she was a victim of abused authority.

== Discography ==
=== Albums ===
List of studio albums, with selected chart positions
Title	Album details	Peak chart positions			
Title	Album details	US	US Ind.	US R&B	Rap Albums
Poe Little Rich Girl	Released: October 26, 2004; Label: Poe Boy Recordings / TVT Records; Formats: CD, LP, Digital download	95	5	12	6
Lil Red Riding Hood	Released: February 24, 2009; Label: JackMove / Gracie / EMI; Formats: CD, Digital download	—	—	—	—

=== Mixtapes ===
- The Official Bootleg (2004)
- Free Agent (2006)
- Jack Tha Rippa (2007)
- Grown & Gangsta (2008)
- BBBP (Bad Bitches Bang Pink) (2009)
- Griselda Blanco, La Madrina (2010)
- Straight From The Underground (2011)

=== Charting singles ===
List of charting singles, showing year released and album name
Title	Year	Peak chart positions		Album
Title	Year	US R&B /HH	US R&B /HH	Album
"Nookie (Real Good)" (featuring Rodney Kohn)	2003	64	61	Poe Little Rich Girl
"Slow Down"	2004	65	65	Poe Little Rich Girl
"Fine" (featuring Ying Yang Twins)	2004	86	—	Poe Little Rich Girl
