= Gorilla Tek =

American record producer and composer

- Birth name: Tony Castillo
- Born: January 3, 1972 (age 53)
- Genres: Rap and hip hop, R&B, dance
- Occupations: Producer
- Labels: Drummajorz

Tony Castillo (born January 3, 1972), better known by his stage name "Gorilla Tek," is an American record producer and composer. He founded the production company Drummajorz. Castillo's work includes contributions to the group “Iconz,” known for the track “Get Fucked Up.” He is represented by JC “Fentz” Louis, CEO of Iconz Worldwide, a music and film enterprise based in South Florida. Castillo has contributed to film scores for productions such as ”Bloodline”, distributed by Codeblack/Universal and the 2008 movie “The Next Hit”, released by Lionsgate.

In 1985, Castillo co-founded the Miami-based group ”The Committee” alongside Carl Bosse, Trek, Fentz, and Chapter. He has also collaborated with DJ Uncle Al and Uncle Luke. By 1999, ”The Committee” had expanded into artist management under the name Iconz Music Group. Between 1998 and 2002, Castillo formed a production duo with Trek, producing for Slip-n-Side Records artists such as Trick Daddy, J-Shin, and Trina. The Opa-Locka-based rap group Iconz, under their management, released “Get Fucked Up” in 2000, which entered the Billboard Hot 100 and reached #93.

== Production discography ==
=== 2000s ===
- Iconz- Street Money Album (Singles “Get Fucked Up and the Remix featuring Lil' Kim) (2001)
- Ludacris featuring DTP – Growing Pains (remix) (2002)
- Iconz- Ya Lookin At Em Album (2003)
- 8 Ball & MJG – Tryin’ Ta Get At You featuring 112 (2004)
- Pitbull – Miami Shit (2006)
- 8 Ball & MJG- Runnin’ out of Bud featuring Too Short (2007)
- Ballgreezy – Shone (2007)
- Ballgreezy - I'm the Sh*t Featuring Brisco and Ace Hood (2008)
- Grind Mode - She's So Fly (I'm So High) (2008)
- Flo Rida – Freaky Deaky (2008)
- Trick Daddy- Tonight featuring Trina and Jaheim
- Trick Daddy- Menage et trios Featuring Field Mob
- Trick Daddy- Children Hold On
- Trick Daddy- Bout Mine
- Trick Daddy- Rags to Riches
- Trick Daddy- Pull Over (Remix)
- Trick Daddy- Have My Cheese
- Trick Daddy- Thug For Life
- Trick Daddy- Ho But can't help It
- Trick Daddy- I'll Be Your Player (Remix)
- Trick Daddy- Goin’ Down Like That
- Pretty Ricky- Personal Trainer
- Jacki-O – Nookie Real Good
- Jacki-O – Champion
- Field Mob – Haters featuring Trick Daddy
- Field Mob - Ready Rock
- Trina - Ball Wit’ Me
- Jagged Edge – When The Bed Shakes*
- Trina- Material Girl
- Trina- Hot Commodity Featuring Rick Ross
- Grandaddy Souf – I Told Ya from the Malibu's Most Wanted Soundtrack
- Sharissa- Any Other Night (Remix) Featuring Scarface
- Luke- Worldwide
- Luke- Lay Your Ass Down Featuring Underground
- Luke- Party Don't Stop Featuring Kid Capri
- Damian Marley – Where is the Love (Remix) Featuring Eve
- The Diplomats – Crunk Music
- Bloodline Original Soundtrack
- Tay Dizm- Point em ou
- Mook & Fair- Sidekick Featuring Ray J
- Maino- Unstoppable
- Welcome Back Fat Boy Rhymer "Wham"
- J Shin "You did it I did it" & "Welcome to the M.I.A"
- Juice Yung N Giant "Where I came from" "All I want"
- The Regulaz "OTL"
- Maino - Day After Tomorrow Album
- BoB - Plain Jane

=== 2010s ===
- Donny Arcade - Anunnaki (2016)
- Donny Arcade - 3600 (2016)
- Donny Arcade - Welcome Back Home featuring Anjolique (2016)

=== 2020's ===
- Steel Drumz - Steel Drumz (2021)
- Steel Drumz - Gorilla Smacks (2023)
- Ballgreezy - I Like It (Summer In Miami) 2022
- Ballgreezy - Look At Her (Summer In Miami) 2022
- Ballgreezy - Priorities (Summer In Miami) 2022
- Ballgreezy - Look At Her (Summer In Miami) 2022
- Ballgreezy - For Da Crib (Summer In Miami) 2023
- Ballgreezy - Sexy Sexy (Bae Day 4) 2023
- Ballgreezy - I Just Want You (Bae Day 4) 2023
