= Warlock Records =

American record label

- Parent company: Phase One Network
- Founder: Adam Levy and Joel Bonner
- Country of origin: United States
- Location: New York City
- Official website: warlockrecords.com

Warlock Records is a record label based in New York City that was founded in 1986 by Adam Levy and Joel Bonner. As of 1999, it comprised more than 45 imprints.

Artists that recorded for Warlock Records include Jungle Brothers, Royal House, Skinny Boys, C-Bo, Esham, Tuff Crew, Blac Haze, Juvenile, Half a Mill, Poison Clan, The Last Mr. Bigg, and Kim Waters.

== History ==
In the 1990s Warlock Records acquired the labels Sleeping Bag Records, Fresh Records, Streetwise Records/Party Time, Ligosa Records, Quality Records USA, Dangerous Records, Pump, N-Coded Music, N2K, Strictly Hype, Underground Construction, High Power Records, Aureus, and Cheetah Records.

In September 2009, Warlock Records and all of its acquired labels were sold to Phase One Network, a music-asset management company that now controls over 20 labels in the pop, hip-hop, dance, jazz, and R&B genres. These recordings are licensed to Traffic Entertainment for physical distribution.

Phase One Network, has licensed songs to various television shows, commercials, video games, and movies including the following:

- Everybody Hates Chris
- Sex and the City
- Entourage
- I Think I Love My Wife
- Grand Theft Auto 3
- Hot Chick
- DJ Hero
