= Trick Daddy =

American rapper (born 1974)

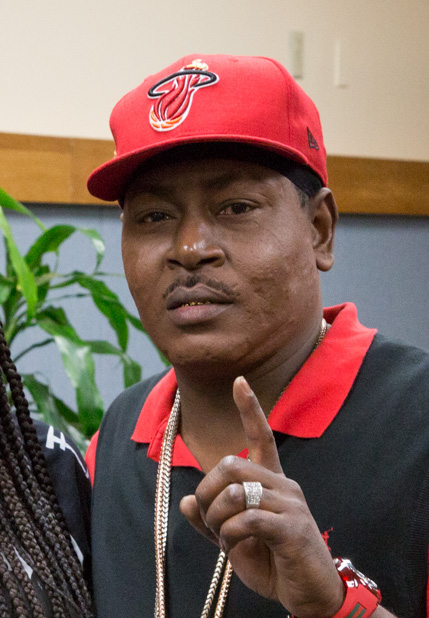
- Trick Daddy in 2015

Background information
- Also known as: Trick Daddy Dollars
- Born: Maurice Samuel Young; September 27, 1974 (age 52)
- Origin: Miami, Florida, U.S.
- Genre: Southern hip-hop
- Occupations: Rapper; songwriter
- Works: Trick Daddy discography
- Years active: 1996–present
- Labels: Slip-n-Slide; Warlock; Dunk Ryder; Atlantic

Maurice Samuel Young (born September 27, 1974), known professionally as Trick Daddy, is an American rapper. He is best known for his 2004 single "Let's Go" (featuring Twista and Lil Jon), which peaked at number seven on the Billboard Hot 100. The album of which it preceded, Thug Matrimony: Married to the Streets (2004) peaked at number two on the Billboard 200 albums chart; both of which remain his most successful releases to date.

Prior, he signed to local record label Slip-n-Slide Records for the release of his debut album Based on a True Story (1997) and its sequel, www.thug.com (1998). Becoming the flagship artist for the label, he signed a joint venture deal with Atlantic Records to release Book of Thugs: Chapter AK Verse 47 (2000), Thugs Are Us (2001), and Thug Holiday (2002), which were met with moderate commercial success. He followed up Thug Matrimony with the albums Back by Thug Demand (2006) and the independently-released Finally Famous: Born a Thug, Still a Thug (2009), and notably guest appeared on hometown native DJ Khaled's singles "I'm So Hood" in 2007 and "Out Here Grindin'" in 2008.

== Early life ==
Maurice Samuel Young was born on September 27, 1974, at Jackson Memorial Hospital in Miami. His mother, Pearl Brockington of South Carolina, raised him and his 10 brothers and sisters in the Liberty Square a public housing project in Liberty City after relocating from Goulds. The building where he grew up was colloquially known as "Pork-N-Beans" in reference to the color of the apartment doors.

His father, Charles, was a local pimp. While Young was a teenager, Charles took him and his brother Derek "Hollywood" Harris to live with him, and during that time, Young and Hollywood began to deal crack cocaine on the streets. At 15 years old, Young was arrested for drug and firearm possession. The day he was released, Young was arrested on an attempted-murder charge for shooting a man during a street fight. He was convicted and sent to prison at 20 years old. His brother was murdered the same year. After he was released from prison, Ted Lucas, founder of Slip-n-Slide Records, urged Young to focus on a rap career and stay off the streets.

== Music career ==
Trick appeared on the track "Scarred" by former 2 Live Crew member Luther "Luke" Campbell, produced by Darren "DJ Spin" Rudnick, from Luke's 1996 album Uncle Luke. The song became a hit and immediately caught the attention of fans and record producers alike. Ted Lucas, a former concert promoter and then-CEO of Slip-n-Slide Records, signed the rapper to the newly formed record label. Slip-n-Slide released Trick Daddy Dollars' debut album Based on a True Story in 1997; the album was popular in the Miami area.

In 1998, when his next album www.thug.com was released, Trick removed "Dollars" from his stage name. Club-oriented track "Nann Nigga", featuring Trina, became a national hit, peaking at the third spot of the Billboard Hot Rap Singles chart. Atlantic Records signed Trick Daddy to the label in 1998 and released Book of Thugs: Chapter AK Verse 47 that year. "Shut Up", was the lead single from Book of Thugs. His next single, "America" (featuring Society), was a poignant political track that writer Omar Burgess compared to other sociological tracks in Trick's catalog such as "Ain't No Santa".

Thugs Are Us, released in 2001, featured the hit single "I'm a Thug" (released March 20, 2001) which reached No. 17 on the Billboard Hot 100. His fifth studio album Thug Holiday contained two singles, "In da Wind" and the title track. In 2004, Thug Matrimony: Married to the Streets was released, with hit single "Let's Go", produced by Lil Jon, featuring Twista, and sampling the guitar riffs from the Ozzy Osbourne hit "Crazy Train". That year, Trick Daddy guest-performed on the Ying Yang Twins' "What's Happnin!", which reached No. 30 on the Hot 100, No. 7 on the Rhythmic Top 40, and No. 9 on the Hot Rap Singles. "Let's Go" peaked on No. 7 on the Hot 100, No. 4 on the Rhythmic Top 40, and No. 4 on Hot Rap Tracks. Back by Thug Demand followed in 2006, with singles "Bet That" and "Tuck Ya Ice" charting on the Hot R&B/Hip-Hop Singles & Tracks chart. This album launched the career of Trick Daddy's Group, Dunk Ryders with their record "Damn Right" featuring Dray Skky, and Trick's Joint Venture Label Deal with Cash Money Records.

Following Back By Thug Demand, Trick Daddy appeared on several singles by DJ Khaled: "Born-N-Raised" in 2006 from Listennn... the Album in 2006, "I'm So Hood" from We the Best in 2007, and "Out Here Grindin'" from We Global in 2008, all among numerous other rappers. "Born-N-Raised" peaked at No. 83 on the Hot R&B/Hip-Hop Singles, and "I'm So Hood" peaked at No. 19 on the Hot 100 and No. 5 on the Hot Rap Tracks. He appeared on Pitbull's 2007 album The Boatlift. Trick Daddy left Slip-n-Slide in 2008 and released his 8th studio album Finally Famous: Born a Thug Still a Thug on September 25, 2009, under his own Dunk Ryder Records label, which by now had grown to include fellow Miami artists Ice "Billion" Berg, Fella, Bad Guy, Kasino, A-Dot, NoLove, Dutch Dirty and Gold Rush, most of which eventually parted ways with the label to start their own independent ventures. He released a single featuring Jeezy, called "I Can't Leave These Streets Alone", and then was featured on the track "This is for You", from Jeezy's latest album, Thug Motivation 103: Hustlerz Ambition, released in December 2011. In July 2012, Trick Daddy released a mixtape entitled Dick & Dynamite as a prequel to his upcoming album release. He continues to tour the United States, performing a mix of both his classic hits and his new releases.

== Film career ==
In 2010, Trick Daddy appeared in the film Just Another Day playing Roman, a drug dealer. The film is about the intersecting lives of an aspiring rapper and an old successful rapper over the course of one day. In 2018, Trick Daddy started appearing in the VH1 reality series Love & Hip Hop: Miami. In 2017, he started his podcast co-hosted by Supa Cindy.

== Legal issues ==
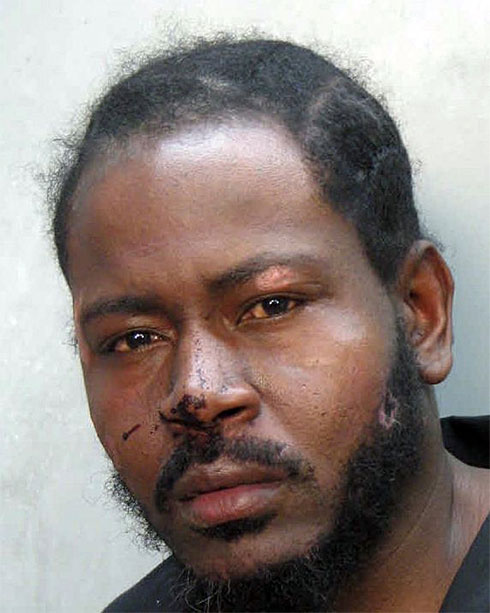
A 2007 mugshot

In 1993, Trick Daddy was convicted of cocaine possession, carrying a concealed weapon and violating probation and served 15 months in Florida state prison. Then in February 2003, he was arrested on gun charges following a dispute at a basketball game, and again in September 2003 after police found cocaine and marijuana in his pocket. He pleaded guilty to cocaine and weapons charges and received probation.

On April 3, 2014, he was arrested outside of his home in Miramar, Florida. According to his arrest report, he was caught by police who were surveilling his home under the suspicion that he was running a grow house. Once police entered his home with a warrant and drug sniffing dogs, they reportedly found one gram of cocaine in Trick Daddy's bedroom, along with a 9mm pistol and ammunition in another bedroom. Police charged Young with possession of cocaine, possession of a firearm and ammunition by a convicted felon, and driving with a suspended license. The following morning, he was released on $6,100 bond.

On January 11, 2020, Trick Daddy was pulled over in Miami by the police because they suspected he was driving while under the influence. After officers smelled alcohol on his breath and he failed a field sobriety test, Trick Daddy was taken into custody at the Hammocks District Station for driving under the influence. While handing over his possessions, police found cocaine wrapped inside a dollar bill. At that point, he was also charged with cocaine possession. His bond was set at $6,000 for both charges.

== Personal life ==
Trick Daddy announced that he has lupus, which has affected his skin, but he stopped taking medication to combat the disease. He stated "for every medicine they gave me I had to take a test or another medicine every thirty days or so to make sure that medicine wasn't causing side effects dealing with kidney or liver failure…I just said all together I ain't taking no medicine."

Trick Daddy has faced financial difficulties, having declared bankruptcy three times, the latest of which came on the day his home was to be foreclosed upon and auctioned away.

Trick Daddy's ex-wife Joy filed for a divorce from him, as she revealed on part 2 of the Love & Hip Hop: Miami Season 2 reunion.

== Discography ==
Studio albums

- Based on a True Story (1997)
- www.thug.com (1998)
- Book of Thugs: Chapter AK Verse 47 (2000)
- Thugs Are Us (2001)
- Thug Holiday (2002)
- Thug Matrimony: Married to the Streets (2004)
- Back by Thug Demand (2006)
- Finally Famous: Born a Thug, Still a Thug (2009)

== Filmography ==
=== Film ===
- Butter as Lawrence Robinson (1998)
- The Brothers as Lenese Epps (2001)
- Soul Plane as Cedric Johnson (2004)

=== Video games ===
- Grand Theft Auto VI as radio host of Dirty South Classics (2026)
