= Slip-n-Slide Records =

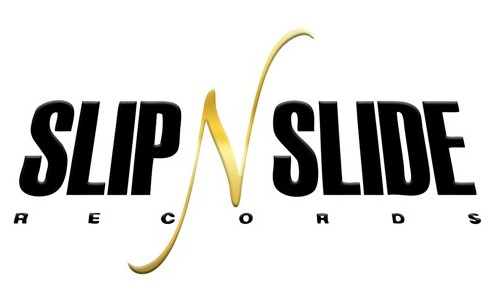
- Parent company: Warner Music Group (1994–present); Universal Music Group (2006–present); EMI (2007–2012)
- Founded: 1994
- Founder: Ted Lucas
- Distributor: Universal Music Group EMPIRE
- Genre: Various
- Country of origin: United States
- Location: Miami, Florida
- Official website: SlipNSlideRecords.net

Slip-N-Slide Records is an American record label, founded in Miami in 1994 by Ted Lucas.

== History ==
Ted Lucas founded the label in 1994. Slip-n-Slide signed local rapper Trick Daddy Dollars in its early years; he debuted in 1997 with the locally popular album Based on a True Story and broke into mainstream success the next year with his second album www.thug.com, having dropped "Dollars" from his stage name. The album included hit single "Nann Nigga", featuring the new rapper Trina. He released some more albums under Slip-n-Slide and scored another top hit in 2004 with "Let's Go" featuring Twista and Lil Jon. His last Slip-n-Slide album was Back By Thug Demand in 2006. In 2008, Trick Daddy left Slip-n-Slide for his own label Dunk Ryders Records. Other rappers signed to Slip-n-Slide include Trina, Rick Ross, and Plies.

Rick Ross signed to Slip-n-Slide in the early 2000s. During his early years under the label, he did guest performances on some releases; he released two albums under the label, Port of Miami in 2006 and Trilla in 2008. Ross left Slip-n-Slide in 2009.

On June 26, 2001, Renee Perkins of District Heights, Maryland sued Slip-n-Slide for failing to edit the expletive "dick" from Trick Daddy's Thugs Are Us album. Perkins bought the edited version of the album for her 11-year-old son to play at a party. Years later, TVT Records was ordered in court to pay Slip-n-Slide $2.3 million in compensatory damages and $6.8 million in punitive damages for blocking the release of Welcome to the 305, an unreleased album that rapper Pitbull recorded with Slip-n-Slide before he signed to TVT. This would be a major factor in the subsequent collapse of TVT.

Lucas started a division of Slip-n-Slide devoted to rock music and signed pop singer Qwote and R&B singer Shonie in 2008. In 2009, Slip-n-Slide signed Jagged Edge, an R&B group that had been previously signed to Def Jam. Previously, Slip-n-Slide focused on developing new artists from the South Florida area.

Slip-n-Slide records is closely affiliated with fellow Miami based label Poe Boy Music Group.

== Famous artists ==
=== Current ===
- Plies

=== Former ===
Act	Years on label	Releases under label	Notes
Brisco	2010	—	
Drew Sidora	2009–2010	1	
J-Shin	2010	1	
Jagged Edge	2009–2013	1	
Pitbull	2005	1 single ("Welcome to the 305")	Entered joint venture with Atlantic Records.
Qwote	2008	1 single ("Don't Wanna Fight" [featuring Shaggy])	Entered joint venture with Jive Records.
Rick Ross	2006–2014	7	Entered joint venture with Def Jam Recordings from 2006 to 2014.
Trick Daddy	1996–2008	7	Flagship artist during tenure
